= List of people from University of Rajshahi =

This is a list of University of Rajshahi alumni and faculty members.

== Intellectual martyr ==
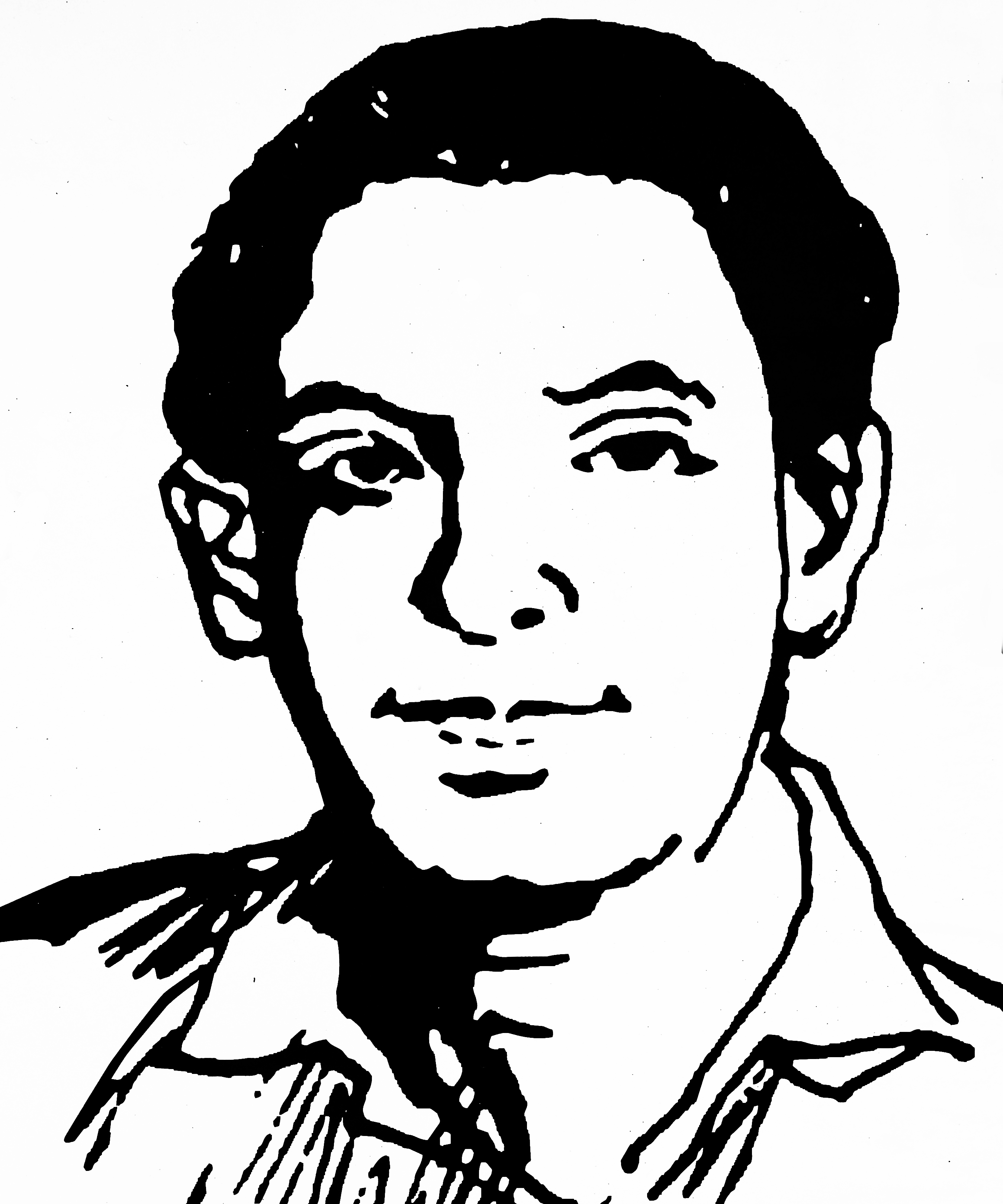
Portrait of Shaheed Shamsuzzoha

- Mohammad Shamsuzzoha, first intellectual martyr of Bangladesh.
- Mir Abdul Qayyum
- Sukharanjan Samaddar
- Lutfunnahar Helen, Bangladeshi educationist, political activist who was killed by Pakistan Army in Bangladesh Liberation War

== Politics and government ==
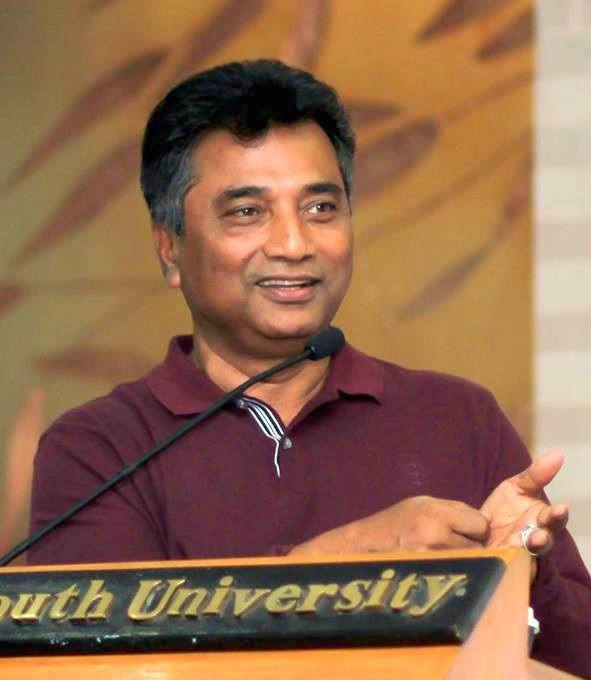
Annisul Huq completed his bachelor's degree from here

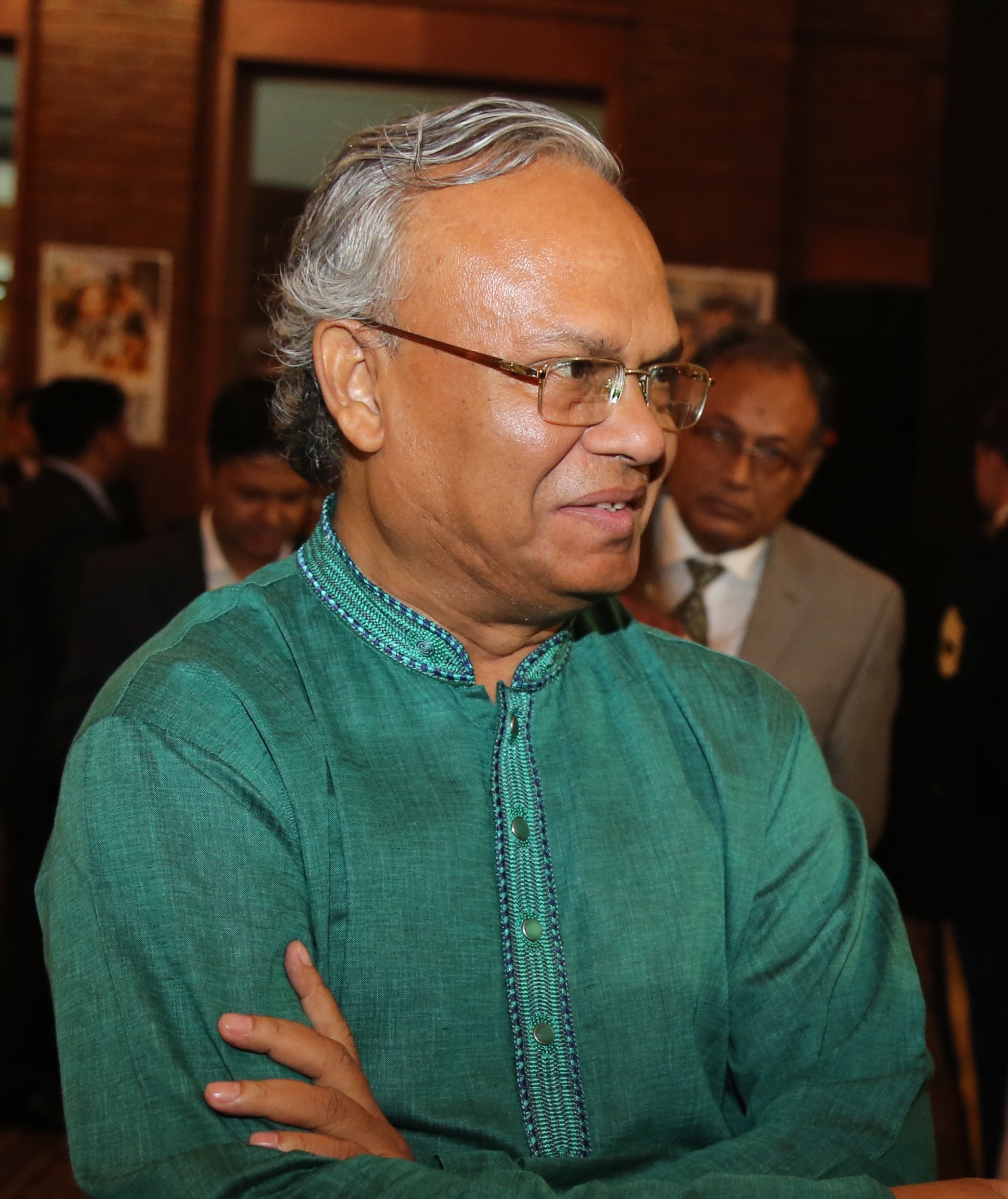
Ruhul Kabir Rizvi, was RUCSU VP during anti-dictator movement

- Abul Hasnat Muhammad Qamaruzzaman, one of the four national leaders of Bangladesh. He was a politician, government minister and a leading member of the Awami League and the Provisional Government of Bangladesh.
- M. Abdur Rahim, member of Drafting committee of Bangladesh constitution. Member of Constituent Assembly and former MP
- Abdullah Al Kafi, politician, educator and social worker and a former member of parliament for Dinajpur-1 constituency from 2001 to 2005 (his death).
- Abu Sayeed, politician, organizer of the war of liberation, and former Minister of State for Information. Former Vice President(VP), Rajshahi University Central Student's Union, (RUCSU).
- Annisul Huq, former mayor of Dhaka North City Corporation.
- Asadul Habib Dulu, organizing secretary, Rangpur division, of Bangladesh Nationalist Party, former MP.
- Biren Sikder, former State Minister for Youth and Sports
- Muhammad Yusuf Ali, first minister for Education and Cultural Affairs in the first cabinet of Bangladesh.
- A. H. M. Khairuzzaman Liton, Bangladesh Awami League politician and present mayor of Rajshahi City Corporation. Son of Abul Hasnat Muhammad Qamaruzzaman.
- Shamsul Hoque Tuku, lawyer, Awami League politician and the former State Minister of Home Affairs, former general secretary, RUCSU
- Harunur Rashid (Chapai Nawabganj politician), Bangladesh Nationalist Party politician and the incumbent Jatiya Sangsad member from the Chapai Nawabganj-3 constituency.
- Fazle Hossain Badsha, lawyer, present general secretary of the Workers Party of Bangladesh, and MP. Former VP RUCSU
- Halima Khatun, activist of Language movement of 1952.
- Fazlur Rahman Potol, Bangladesh Nationalist Party politician, former MP and former VP of RUCSU.
- Khalid Mahmud Chowdhury, State Minister of Shipping.
- Mosaddek Hossain Bulbul, former mayor of Rajshahi City Corporation
- Mostafizur Rahman (politician), former Minister of Primary and Mass Education, also served in several ministries.
- Md. Atiur Rahman, Bangladeshi academic, former MP and politician belonging to BNP from Dinajpur.
- Narayon Chandra Chanda, former Minister and State Minister of Fisheries and Livestock
- Ohidur Rahman, former Member of Jatiya Sangsad
- Pijush Kanti Bhattacharjee, Bangladeshi academic, freedom fighter and politician from Jessore belonging to Bangladesh Awami League.
- Ruhul Kabir Rizvi, senior joint secretary general of Bangladesh Nationalist Party, former VP of RUCSU during the anti-dictator movement against Ershad's regime.
- Saifuzzaman Shikhor politician, MP in the incumbent Jatiya Sangsad representing the Magura-1 constituency.
- Shahiduzzaman Sarker, former Whip at the Parliament.
- Syeda Asifa Ashrafi Papia, BNP politician.
- Bir Bahadur Ushwe Sing, is a Bangladeshi politician and Member of Parliament and also Minister of Chittagong Hill Tracts Affairs.
- Zinnatunnessa Talukdar, former State Minister of Women and Children Affairs and Minister of Primary and Mass Education, Begum Rokeya Padak awardee.
- Shafiqur Rahman Badsha, politician, MP in the incumbent Jatiya Sangsad representing the Rajshahi-2 constituency.
- President Mohammed Shahabuddin was a student of Rajshahi University

== Civil servants ==
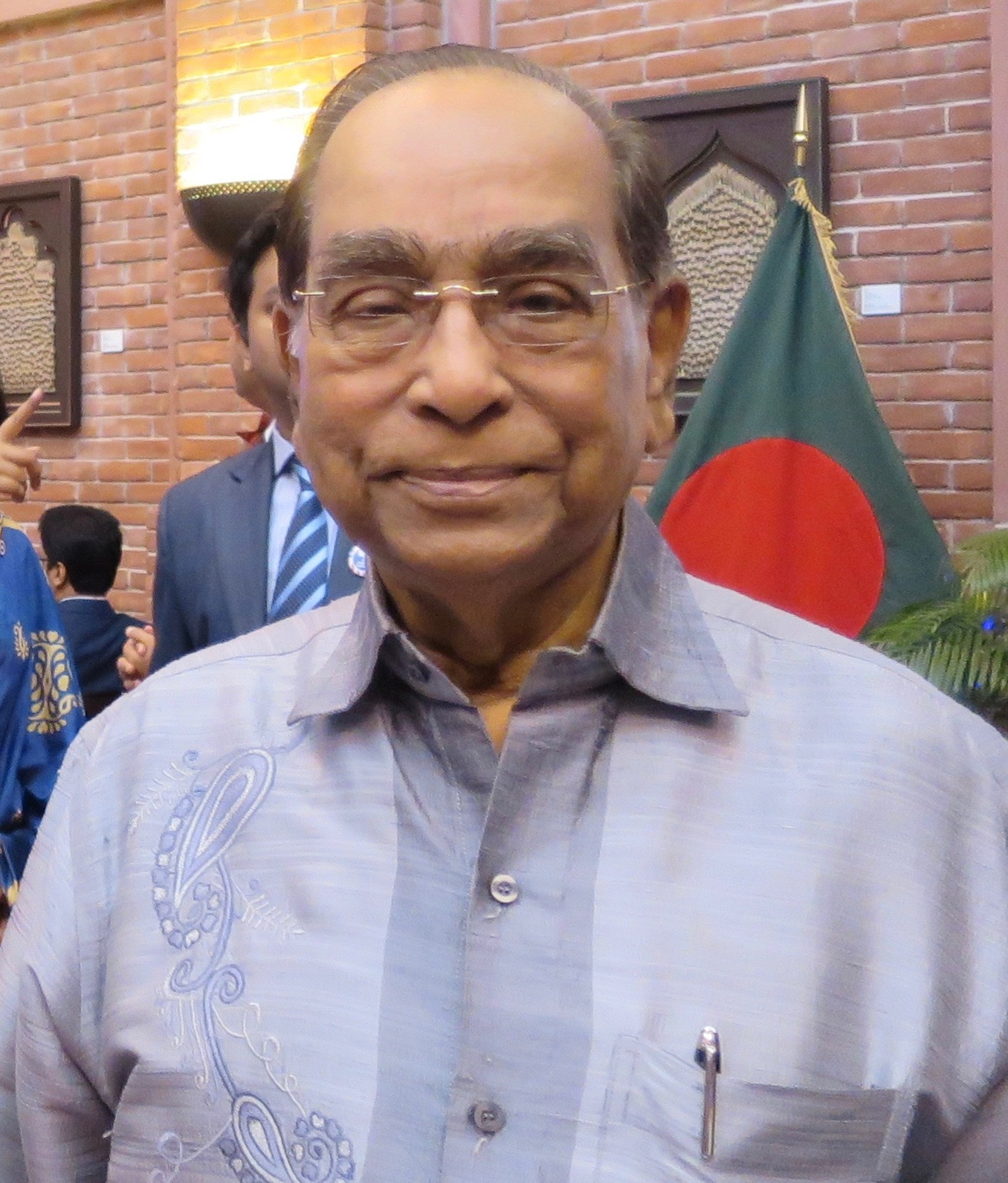
HT Imam did his bachelor's degree here

- Md. Akram-Al-Hossain is a Bangladeshi civil servant who is currently serving as Secretary of the Ministry of Primary and Mass Education.
- Shyamal Kanti Ghosh, former Secretary of the Ministry of Agriculture
- Mohammad Nazmul Haque, Independence Awardee martyred Deputy Director of Anti-Corruption in Chittagong during the Bangladesh Liberation War, martyred during the war.
- Enamul Huq, former Inspector General of Police of Bangladesh Police, and a member of the Law Commission from 2004 to 2007.
- H T Imam, former civil servant and political advisor of the PM.
- Kabita Khanam, first female Election Commissioner of Bangladesh.
- M. Sayeedur Rahman Khan, physicist and diplomat. One of the delegation members to UN claiming recognition for International Mother Language Day.

== Academician ==
- Syed Ali Ahsan, Independence Day Award and Ekushey Padak awardee National Professor of Bangladesh official English translator of the National Anthem of Bangladesh.
- Itrat Husain Zuberi, Founding Vice Chancellor of the University of Rajshahi, teacher of Sheikh Mujibur Rahman at Islamia College, Calcutta.
- Muhammad Mizanuddin, sociologist, 22nd Vice-chancellor of Rajshahi University since March 20, 2013.
- Mohammad Moniruzzaman Miah, 20th Vice Chancellor of Dhaka University and Ekushey Padak awardee prominent academician.
- Sadequl Arefin, current VC of University of Barisal.
- Shaikh Abdus Salam, current VC of Islamic University, Bangladesh.
- Mohammad Moniruzzaman Miah, former VC of Dhaka University, he was a student here.
- Muhammad Abdul Hamid, 3rd VC (from 18 June 1991 to 21 March 1995) of Islamic University, Bangladesh.
- Qaisuddin, 5th VC of Islamic University, and former VC of Bangladesh Open University.
- M. Rafiqul Islam, 8th VC of Islamic University, Bangladesh.
- M. Alauddin, 10th VC of the Islamic University, Bangladesh, from March 2009 to December 2012.
- Mijanur Rahman, former VC of Jagannath University
- Maqbular Rahman Sarkar, tenth vice-chancellor of Rajshahi University

== Jurists ==
- Muhammad Habibur Rahman, 7th Chief Justice of Bangladesh Supreme Court, former Chief Advisor of the Caretaker Government.
- Mohammad Shah Alam, prominent jurist if Bangladesh, founder of Department of Law, University of Chittagong.

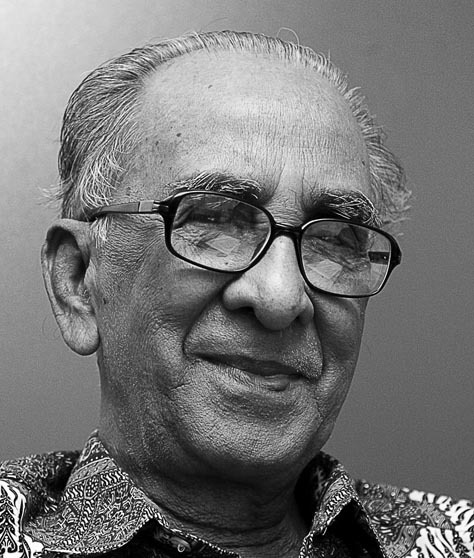
Chief Justice habibur Rahman was a faculty member and dean here.

- Krishna Debnath, First Hindu female Justice of Bangladesh Supreme court.
- Md. Shahinur Islam, former justice, High Court Division Supreme Court of Bangladesh.
- Rafiqul Islam, Professor Emeritus, Macquarie Law School.
- Shawkat Alam, Professor, Macquarie Law School.
- Salimullah Khan, Social Scientist, writer, professor and jurist.

== Linguists ==
=== Comparative linguistics ===
- Dr Muhammad Shahidullah, was an Independence Day Awardee Bengali linguist, philologist, educationist, and writer; ranked number 16 in BBC's poll of the Greatest Bengali of all time.

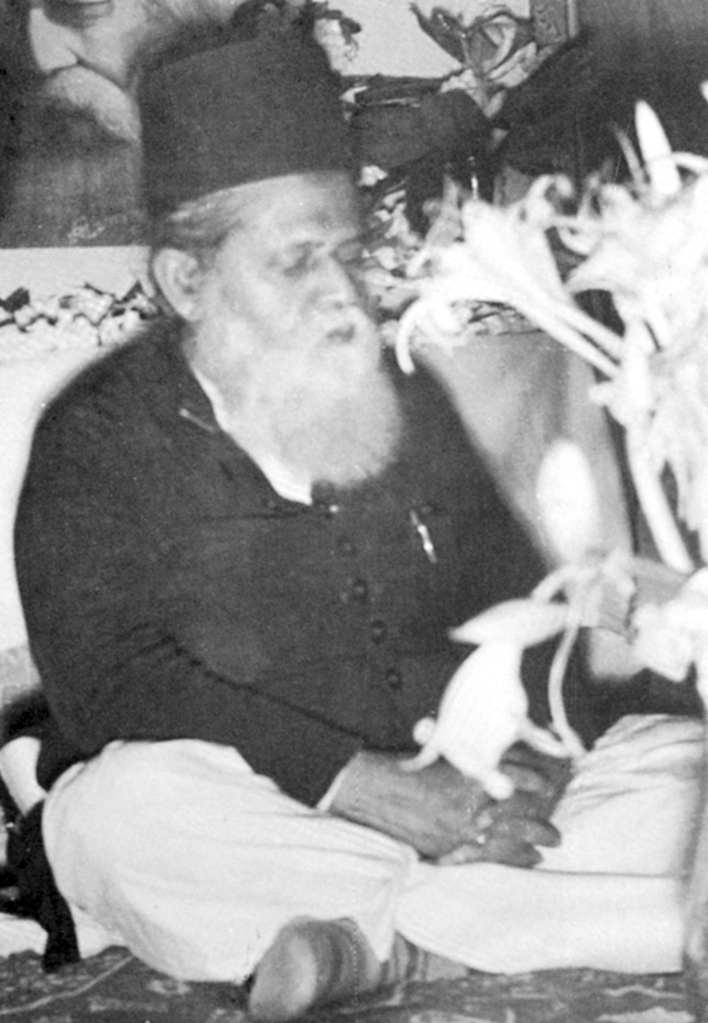
Dr Muhammad Shahidullah was a faculty member at the Department of Bengali

=== Bengali ===
- Muhammad Enamul Haq Independence Day Award, Ekushey Padak, Sitara-i-Imtiaz and Bangla Academy Literary Award awardee Bangladeshi researcher, linguist litterateur and educationist.
- Mazharul Islam (poet), Bangladeshi poet, folklorist, academic and former DG Bangla Academy
- Ghulam Murshid, Bangla Academy Literary Awardee author, scholar and journalist. Credited with his key role in developing the first evolutionary dictionary of Bengali Language.
- Mustafa Nur-Ul Islam, Independence Day Award and Ekushey Padak awardee National Professor of Bangladesh. He was the founder director of Bangladesh Shilpakala Academy, the Director General of Bangla Academy and the Chairman of Bangladesh National Museum.
- Abu Hena Mustafa Kamal, Lunguist and former Director of Bangla Academy.

=== English ===
- Zillur Rahman Siddiqui, Independence Day Award and Bangla Academy Literary Award awardee prominent linguist.
- Ali Anwar, Bangla Academy Literary Award winner Academician, writer, essayist, litterateur and translator
- A. F. M. Rezaul Karim Siddique, murdered professor of English.

== Economists ==
- Sanat Kumar Saha, Ekushey Padak, Bangla Academy Literary Award winner Bangladeshi polymath, educator, economist and Tagore exponent.
- Muhammad Abdul Hamid, prominent economist, researcher, writer and academician.
- M. Rafiqul Islam, academician, professor and writer. He was 8th vice-chancellor of Islamic University, Bangladesh.

== Historian ==
- A. F. Salahuddin Ahmed, Independence Day Award and Ekushey Padak winner National Professor of Bangladesh. He is a historian, humanist and rationalist thinker.

== Sociologist ==
- Badruddin Umar, Communist polymath
- Salimullah Khan, Social Scientist, writer, professor and jurist.

== Islamic scholar ==
- Muhammad Asadullah Al-Ghalib, reformist Islamic scholar, leader of a puritan Islamic movement Ahl-i Hadith Andalon Bangladesh

== Chemistry ==
Dr Fazlul Halim Chowdhury

- M. Alauddin, He is a life Member (MRSC) of the Royal Society of Chemistry in UK.
- Fazlul Halim Chowdhury, pioneering contributor in development of physical chemistry in Bangladesh, fellow Bangladesh Academy of Sciences and one of the longest-serving Vice-Chancellors of the University of Dhaka.

== Engineers ==
=== Computer Scientists ===
- A B M Shawkat Ali, Bangladeshi origin-Australian author, computer scientist and data analyst.
- Bibhuti Roy, Bangladeshi-German computer scientist.

=== Mechanical Engineers ===
- Mohd. Rafiqul Alam Beg, professor of mechanical engineering and former vice chancellor of Rajshahi University of Engineering & Technology (RUET).

== Physics ==
- Arun Kumar Basak, the only Professor Emeritus in Physics in Bangladesh. Nuclear and theoretical Physicist.

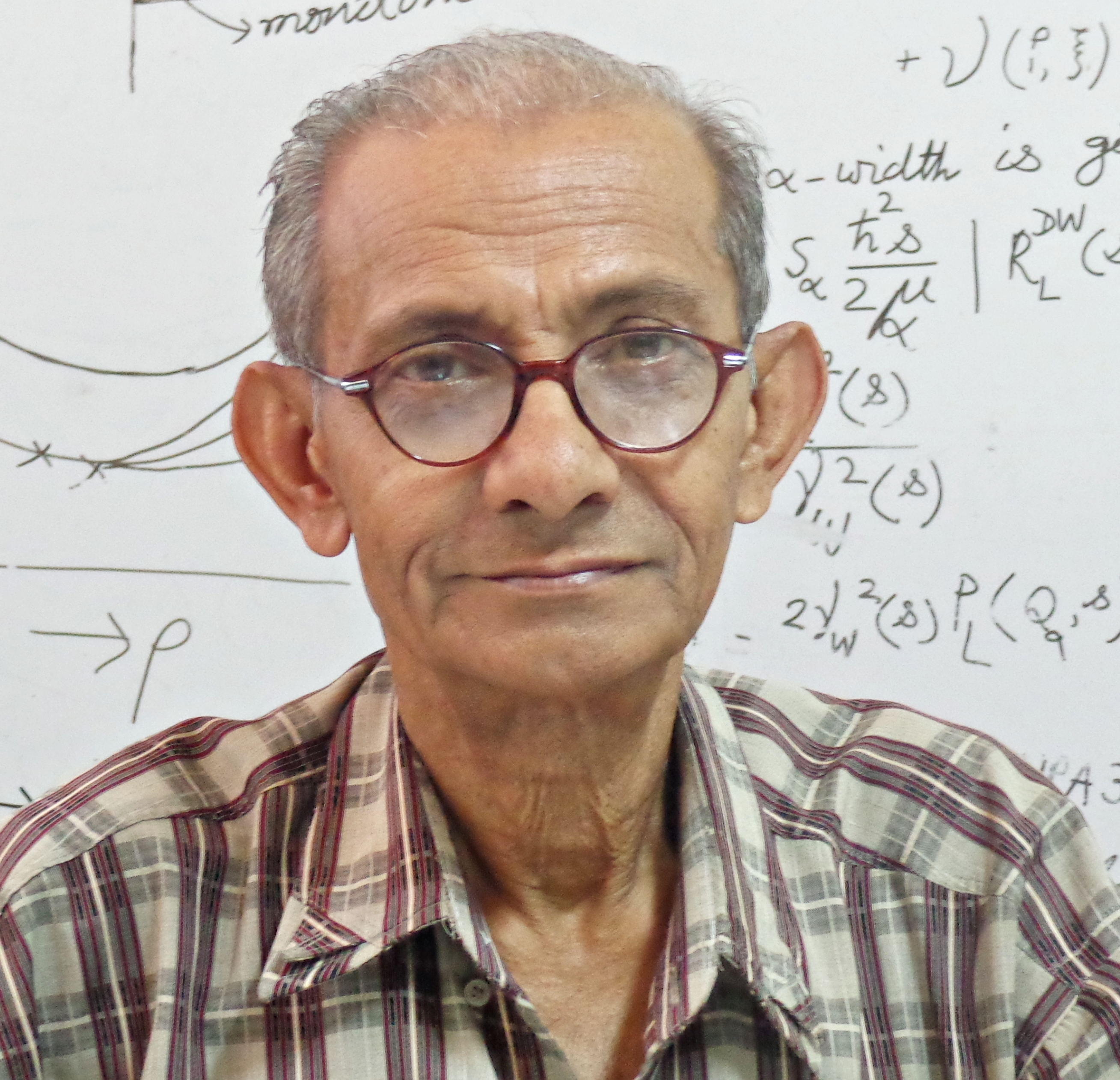
Arun Kumar Basak

- Sadruddin Ahmed Chowdhury, one of the instrumental figures in founding Shahjalal University of Science and Technology (SUST) and was a Vice Chancellor of SUST and Sylhet International University.
- M. Sayeedur Rahman Khan, physicist and diplomat.

== Statistics ==
- Khandkar Manwar Hossain founder of Statistics department at University of Rajshahi

== Literature ==
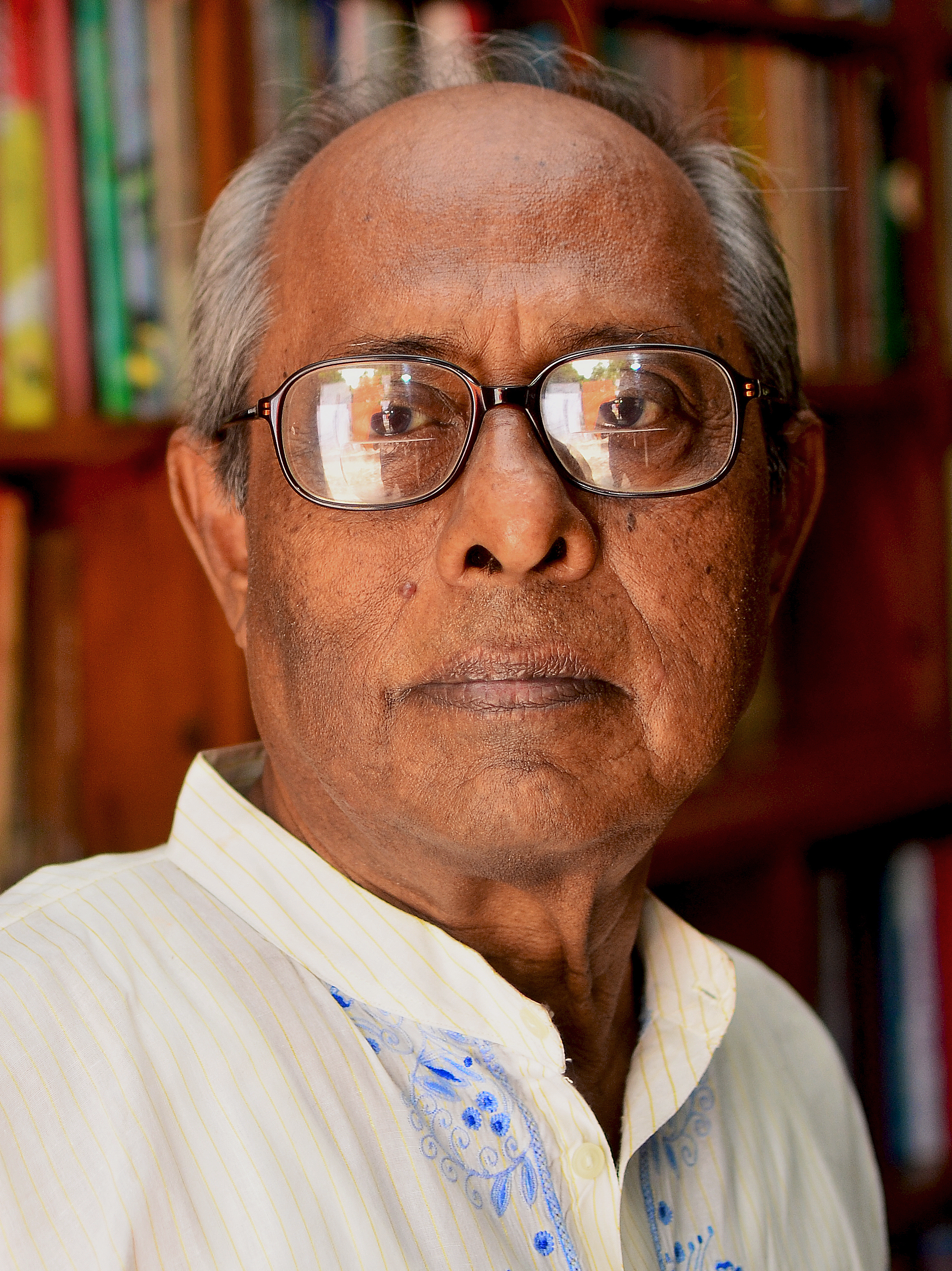
Hasan Azizul Huq

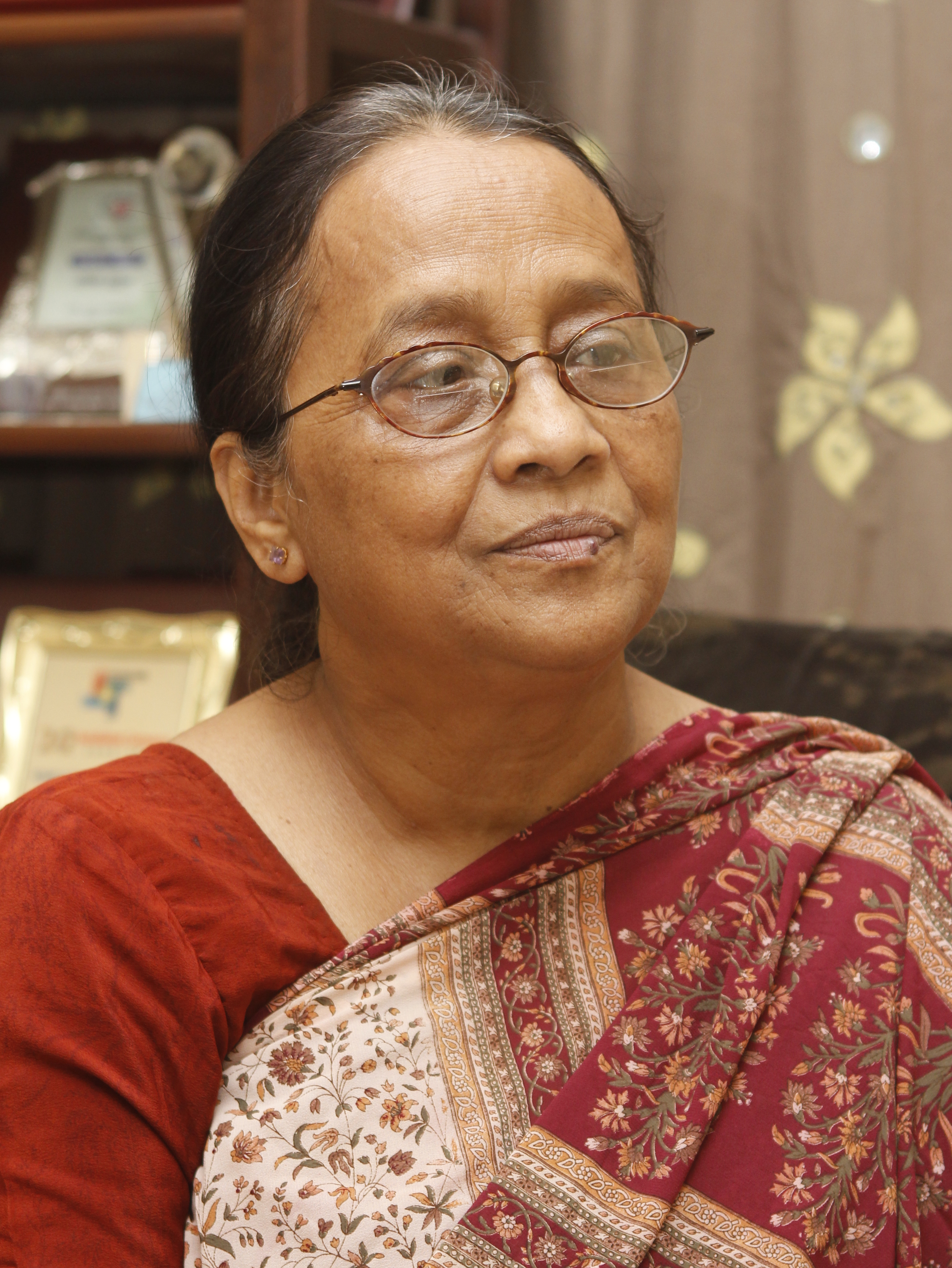
Selina Hossain

- Omar Ali, Ekushey Padak awardee Bangladeshi poet.
- Sanat Kumar Saha Bangladeshi educator, economist, and Tagore exponent, Ekushey Padak awardee Tagore exponent.
- Hasan Azizul Huq, Independence Award, Ekushey Padak and Bangla Academy Literary Award winner short story writer and novelist. He is often referred to as one of the most prominent short story writer of Bengali languages of all time. "Agun Pakhi" is his most famous literature.
- Selina Hossain, Independence Award, Ekushey Padak and Bangla Academy Literary Award winner novelist. Her notable work includes,Hangor Nodi Grenade (1976) and Poka Makorer Ghor Boshoti (1996).
- Mahadev Saha, Independence Award, Ekushey Padak and Bangla Academy Literary Award winner poet.
- Razia Khan, Ekushey Padak and Bangla Academy Literary Award winner writer, poet and educationist.
- Abul Asad, writer and journalist. He is the editor of one of the oldest national dailies in Bangladesh The Daily Sangram. Famous for his Islamic Thriller series- the Saimum Series.
- Abdul Hye Sikder, Bangladeshi poet. He is a former executive director of Nazrul Institute and vice president of Jatiya Nazrul Samaj. He received the Bangla Academy Literary Award in 2003.
- Faizul Islam (writer), writer and civil servant. He received the Prothom Alo Book of the Year award in 2017 for his book Khwaj Khizir er Sinduk.
- Zulfikar Matin, Bangladeshi poet. He was awarded the Bangla Academy Literary Award in the essay/research category in 2023.
- Imtiar Shamim, Bangladeshi novelist and writer.[1] He was awarded the Bangla Academy Literary Award for fiction in 2021
- Iftekhar mahmud, law professor and eassyist.

== Art ==
=== Actors ===
- Ahmed Sharif, actor who has acted in more than eight hundred Bengali films.
- Sharmili Ahmed, television and film actress.
- Riaz (actor) three times National Film Awards winner actor, producer, and television presenter.
- Murad Parvez film and television director. Directed films like Chandragrohon and Brihonnola
- Shams Sumon actor and on the Bangladesh National Film Award for Best Supporting Actor for the film Sopnopuron

=== Comedian ===
- Abu Hena Rony, Stand-up comedian, Mime artist, actor, presenter and model. Also popular in India.

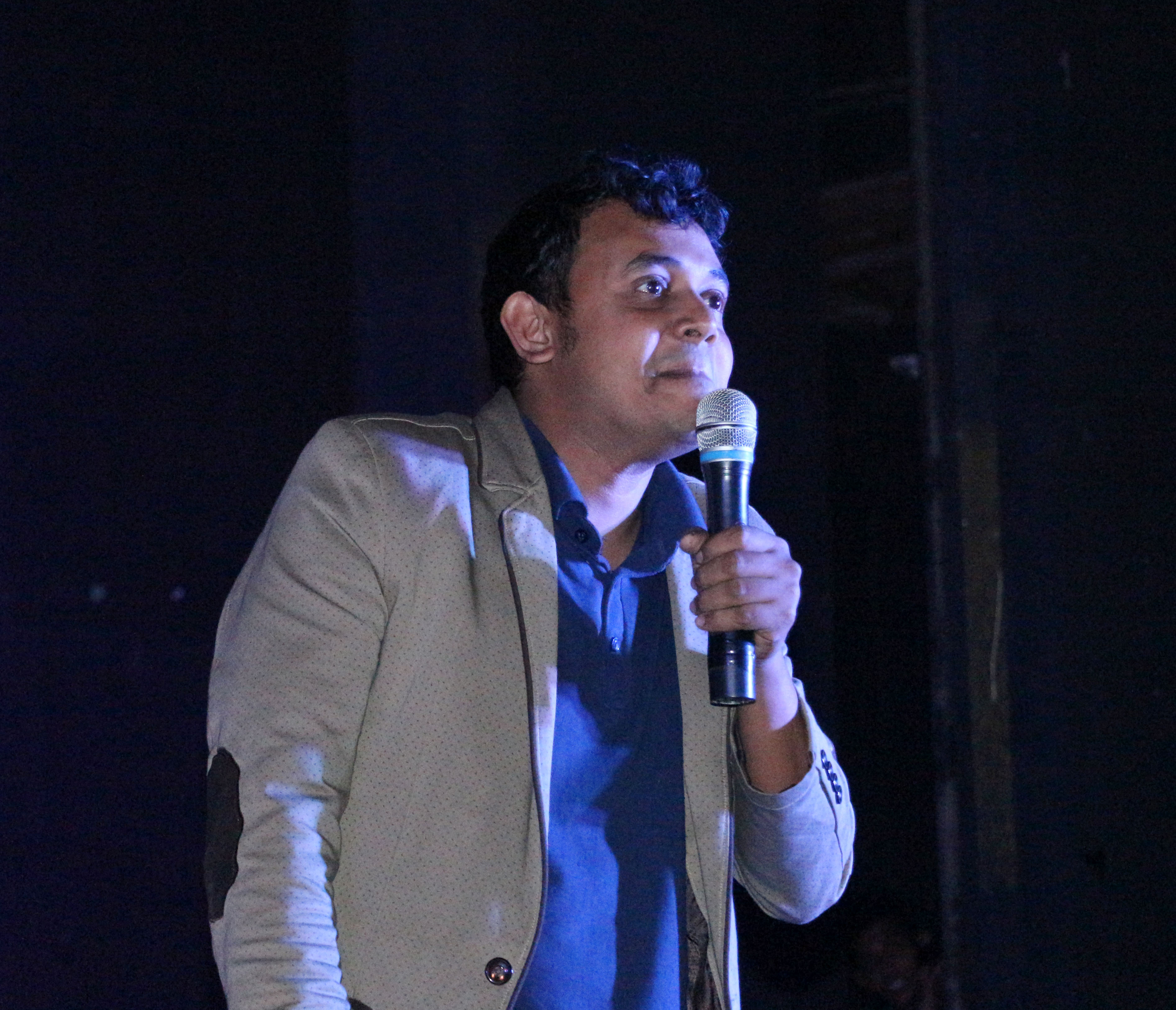
Abu Hena Rony

=== Music ===
- Rafiqul Alam (singer), National Film Awards winner Musician.
- Mohammad Rafiquzzaman, National Film Awards winner lyricist.
- Andrew Kishore, 8 times National Film Awards winner playback singer.

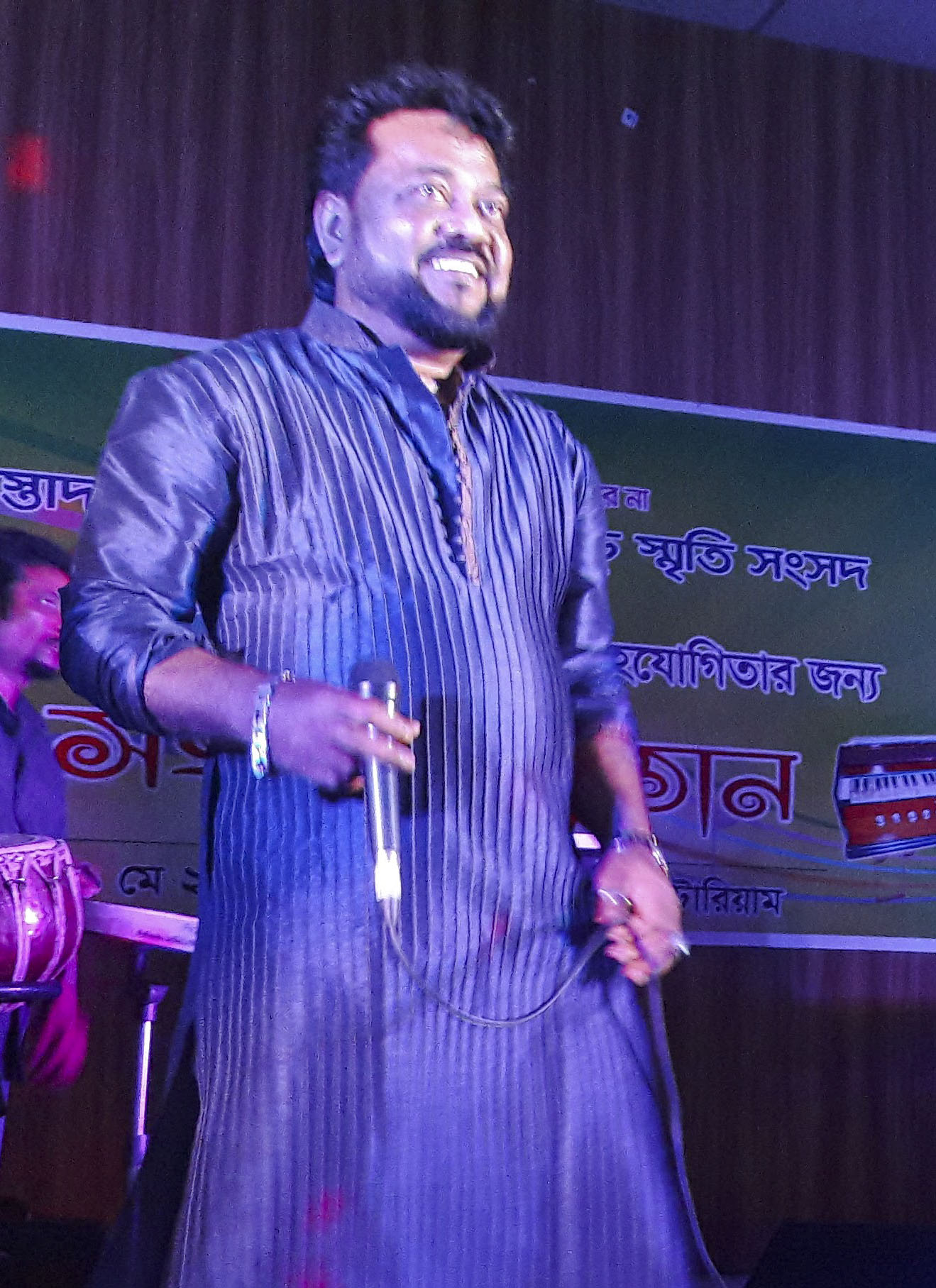
Andrew Kishore

- Fatema Tuz Zohra Ekushey Padak awardee Nazrul Geeti singer.
- Farida Parveen, Bangladesh National Film Award winner prominent folk singer. Referred to as "the Queen of Lalon song.
- Rizia Parveen, playback singer.
- Lutfor Hasan, singer-songwriter, musician, and author
- Omar Khaled Rumi, Musician. (Ex Student of University of Rajshahi)

=== Drama and theatre ===
- Momtazuddin Ahmed, Ekushey Padak winner prominent playwright-actor and educationist.
- Malay Bhowmick, Bangla Academy Award winner Bangladeshi playwright, actor, director, and educationist. Professor, Department of Management Studies.

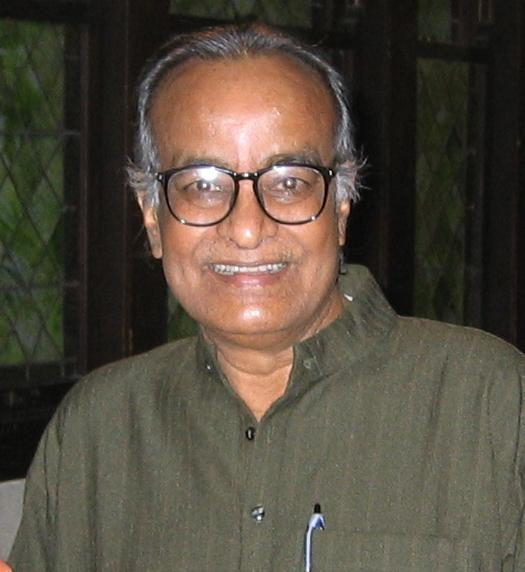
Momtazuddin Ahmed

=== Director ===
- Giasuddin Selim, National Film Awards winner Director and Screenwriter. Directed films like, Monpura and Swapnajaal.
- Masum Reza, Bangla Academy Literary Award winner playwright, television drama and stage play director and novelist.

== Sports ==
- Omar Khaled Rumi, Bangladesh national cricket team. (Ex Student of University of Rajshahi)
- Khoda Box Mridha, Commentator (Ex Student of Political Science, University of Rajshahi)
- Khaled Mashud Pilot, one of the most successful wicket-keeper for Bangladesh national cricket team. (Ex Student of History, University of Rajshahi)
- Al-Amin Hossain, Fast bowler, Bangladesh national cricket team. (Ex Student of Pub. Administration, University of Rajshahi)
