= List of Bangla Academy Literary Award recipients (1980–1989) =

This is a list of the recipients of the Bangla Academy Literary Award from 1980 to 1989.

== 1980 ==
1. Dilwar Khan (poetry)
2. Selina Hossain (novel)
3. Humayun Kadir (short story)
4. Abu Mohamed Habibullah (essay-research)
5. Al Kamal Abdul Ohab (juvenile literature)
6. Neyamal Basir (translation)

== 1981 ==
1. Omar Ali (poetry)
2. Rafiq Azad (poetry)
3. Humayun Ahmed (novel)
4. Laila Samad (short story)
5. Abdul Mannan Syed (essay-research)
6. Abul Kashem Fazlul Haq (essay-research)
7. Halima Khatun (juvenile literature)
8. Razia Mahbub (juvenile literature)
9. Sunil Kumar Mukhopaddhay (juvenile literature)

== 1982 ==
1. Nirmalendu Goon (poetry)
2. Akhteruzzaman Elias (short story)
3. Ghulam Murshid (essay-research)
4. Mustafa Nurul Islam (essay-research)
5. Mamunur Rashid (drama)

== 1983 ==
1. Mahadev Saha (poetry)
2. Subrata Barua (short story)
3. Khalekdad Chowdhury (novel)
4. Selim Al Deen (drama)
5. Abul Hasna Md Ismail (essay-research)
6. Mohammad Abdul Zabbar (essay-research)
7. Hayat Mamud (juvenile literature)
8. Gazi Shamsur Rahman (translation)
9. Mohammad Abdul Jabbar (essay-research)

== 1984 ==
1. Belal Chowdhury (poetry)
2. Rashid Haider (novel)
3. Muhammad Habibur Rahman (essay-research)
4. Rafiqul Islam (essay-research)

== 1985 ==
None

== 1986 ==
1. Mohammad Rafiq
2. Humayun Azad

== 1987 ==
1. Asad Chowdhury
2. Dwijen Sharma

== 1988 ==
1. Abubakar Siddique
2. Mohammad Nurul Huda

== 1989 ==
1. Azizul Haque
2. Syed Akram Hossain
