= Mayurpankhi (publisher) =

Indian publishing company

- Status: Active
- Founded: 2014
- Country of origin: Bangladesh
- Headquarters location: Dhaka
- Official website: www.mayurpankhi.com

Mayurpankhi (Bengali: ময়ূরপঙ্খি) is a publishing house of children's books based in Dhaka, Bangladesh specializing in picture books. It was founded in 2014 and publishes books in Bengali and English. Its CEO is Mitia Osman (Bengali: মিতিয়া ওসমান). In 2016, Mayurpankhi won the Bangla Academy's Rokonuzzaman Khan Dadabhai Smriti Award for children's literature.
