= Ashraf Siddiqui =

Bangladeshi poet (1927–2020)

Director General of Bangla Academy
- In office 4 June 1976 – 30 June 1982
- Preceded by: Mustafa Nur-Ul Islam
- Succeeded by: Manzoore Mawla

Personal details
- Born: 1 March 1927 Tangail, Bengal Presidency, British India
- Died: 19 March 2020 (aged 93) Dhaka, Bangladesh
- Occupation: Writer
- Awards: Independence Award (2026)
- Website: ashrafsiddiqui.com

Ashraf Siddiqui (1 March 1927 – 19 March 2020) was a Bangladeshi poet, researcher, folklorist, and essayist. He was awarded Bangla Academy Literary Award in 1964 and Ekushey Padak in 1988 by the Government of Bangladesh. In 2026, he was posthumously awarded Independence Award, the highest civilian honour of Bangladesh.

== Early life and education ==
Siddiqui was born in Nagbari village of Tangail. Siddiqui completed his master's from the University of Dhaka in Bengali literature. He earned his Ph.D. in folklore studies from the Indiana University Bloomington.

== Career ==
Siddiqui served as a faculty member at Rajshahi College, Chittagong College, Ananda Mohan College, Dhaka College, Jagannath College and the University of Dhaka. He served as the director of Kendrio Bangla Unnoyon Board, chief editor of District Gazetteer and director general of Bangla Academy during 1976–1982.

Siddiqui also served as the chairman of Bangladesh Sangbad Sangstha, chairman of Bangladesh Press Institute and president of Nazrul Academy and Nazrul Institute.

== Personal life ==
Siddiqui was married to Syeda Siddiqui from 1951 until her death in 1997. He died at the age of 93 in 2020. They had a daughter, Riffat Ahmed, the chairperson of Siddiquis' International School (As of 2023).

== Awards ==
- Ekushey Padak for literature (1988)
- Bangla Academy Literary Award for children's literature in 1964
- UNESCO Award (1966)
- Daud Award
