= Abul Kashem Fazlul Haq =

Bangladeshi writer, translator and critic (1940–2026)

- আবুল কাসেম ফজলুল হক
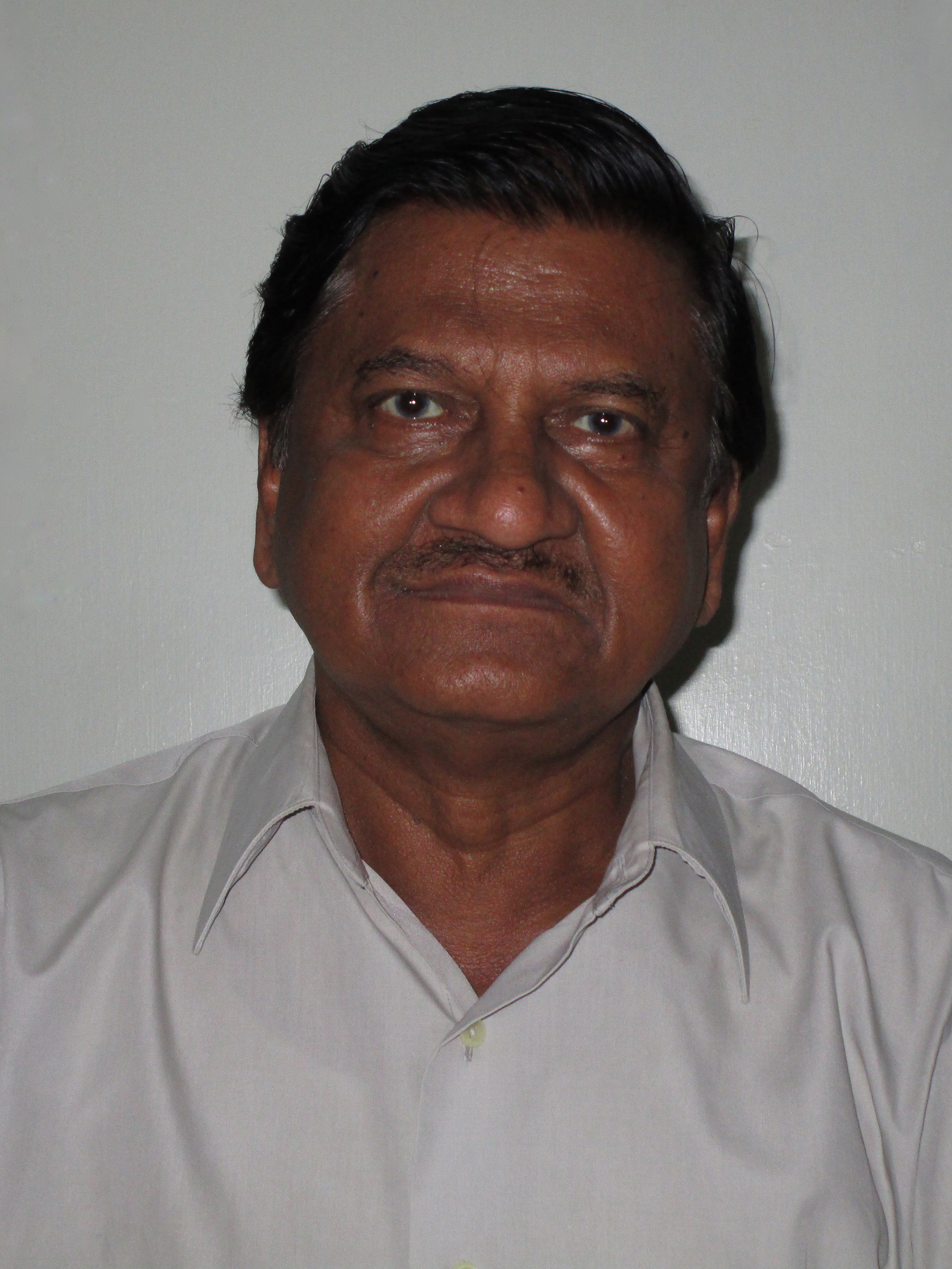
- Huq in 2015

President of Bangla Academy
- In office 27 October 2024 – 5 July 2026
- Preceded by: Selina Hossain
- Succeeded by: Vacant

Personal details
- Born: 30 September 1940 Pakundia, Bengal Province, British India
- Died: 5 July 2026 (aged 85) Dhaka, Bangladesh
- Children: Faisal Abedin Deepan
- Education: University of Dhaka
- Occupation: Academic, writer
- Awards: Bangla Academy Literary Award (1981)

Abul Kashem Fazlul Haq (30 September 1940 – 5 July 2026) was a Bangladeshi writer, essayist, translator, critic, columnist and activist. He was a professor of Bengali language and literature at the University of Dhaka. He was the convener of Rashtrabhasha Bangla Rokkha Komiti (State Language Bengali Protection Committee). He received the Bangla Academy Literary Award in 1981. On 27 October 2024, the interim government appointed Haq as the new president of Bangla Academy for a three-year term.

== Early life ==
Haq was born in Pakundia, Kishoreganj in the then Bengal Province, British India to Muhammad Abdul Hakim and Jahanara Khatun.

He passed the entrance examination from Mymensingh Zilla School in 1959. In 1961, he passed the higher secondary certificate in Science from Ananda Mohan College. He graduated from the University of Dhaka in 1965 and completed his post-graduation from the same university in 1966. While studying at the university, he came in contact with Munir Chowdhury, Ahmed Sharif, Humayun Azad, Nilima Ibrahim and was introduced to progressive ideas.

== Career ==
Haq was a faculty member of the Department of Bengali at the University of Dhaka for more than forty years. He edited the literary magazine called Lokayata from 1982 until his death. He was the convener of the "State Language Bengali Protection Committee" formed with the goal to ensure Bangla language usage everywhere.

== Personal life and death ==
Haq was married to Farida Pradhan. Their son, Faisal Arefin Dipan, a publisher, was murdered by a jihadist group in 2015.

Haq died on 5 July 2026, at the age of 85, while being treated at a hospital in Mirpur, Dhaka.

== Selected bibliography ==
- Muktir Sangram (1972)
- Kaler Jatrar Dhwani (2004)
- Ekushe February Andolon (1976)
- Manush o Tar Poribesh (1988)
- Sahityacinta (1995)
- Rajniti o Dorshon (1989)
- Bangladesher Rajnitite Buddhijibider Bhumika (1997)
- Unish Shataker Modhyashreni o Bangla Sahitya (1979)
- Mao Setunger Gyantattwa (1987)
- Sahitya o Sangskriti Prosonge (2002)
- Shreshtha Prabandha (2011)

=== Translations ===
- Rajnoitik Adarsha (1972), a translation of Bertrand Russell's Political Ideals
- Nobojuger Protthyasha (1989), a translation of Bertrand Russell's New Hopes for a Changing World

=== Editor ===
- Lokayata
