= S'adat Ali Akhand =

Bangladeshi writer

- সা’দত আলি আখন্দ
- Born: 1 July 1899; Bogra, Bengal Presidency, British India
- Died: 12 May 1971 (aged 71); Bogra, Bangladesh
- Education: University of Calcutta

S'adat Ali Akhand (1 July 1899 – 12 May 1971) was a Bangladeshi essayist and litterateur. His notable books include Itihasher Xahid (1935), Otit O Bortoman (1936), Muhammad bin Qasim (1936), Osman Khan (1936), Dayud Khan (1936), Tero Numberey Panch Bosor (1969) and Onya Din Onya Jiban (1969).

== Early life and education ==
Akhand was born on 1 July in 1899 at Chingsapur village, in Bogra district in the then Bengal Presidency, British India. He completed his matriculation from Coronation School at Bogra in 1916, IA from St. Xavier's College, Kolkata in 1918 and BA (Hons) from Rajshahi College in 1920. He later obtained a law degree from University of Calcutta in 1933.

== Career ==
Akhand worked as a school teacher at Bogra's Sariakandi Narsi High School and at Mohimganj and Bagbari High Schools during 1920–1922. He then served as an officer at the Police Department in Kolkata for 33 years until his retirement in 1955.

While living in Kolkata, he contributed articles in the Saogat and Bulbul magazines.

== Death and legacy ==
Akhand died on 12 May 1971 in Bogra. Bangla Academy introduced an annual literary award since 1990 with the title S'adat Ali Akhand Literature Award. In 2009, the academy published the whole collection of Akhand's work, S'adat Ali Akhand Rachanabali.
