= Ekhlasuddin Ahmed =

Bangladeshi children's writer (1940–2014)

- Born: 15 December 1940; 24 Parganas, West Bengal, British India
- Died: 24 December 2014 (aged 74); Dhaka, Bangladesh
- Awards: Ekushey Padak

Ekhlasuddin Ahmed (15 December 1940 – 24 December 2014) was a Bangladeshi children's writer. He was awarded the Ekushey Padak, one of the highest civilian awards in Bangladesh, in 2000.

== Early life and career ==
Ahmed was born in 1940 in the 24 Parganas district of West Bengal province. He is also a journalist and has been associated with the Daily Janakantha. Among the awards he has received are the "Kabir Chowdhury Children's Literary Award" of the Bangla Academy (2004), Uro Child Literature Award (2007), Alaol Literary Award and the Shishu Academy Award.

Ahmed died at Square Hospital in Dhaka on 24 December 2014.
