= Monzur-I-Mowla =

Bangladeshi author (1940–2020)

Monzur-I-Mawla
- মনজুরে মওলা

Director General of Bangla Academy
- In office 31 December 1982 – 11 March 1986
- Preceded by: Ashraf Siddiqui
- Succeeded by: Abu Hena Mustafa Kamal

Personal details
- Born: Kazi Mohammad Manzoore Mawla; 1 October 1940 Dhaka, Bengal Presidency, British India
- Died: 20 December 2020 (aged 80) Dhaka, Bangladesh

Monzur-I-Mowla (1 October 1940 – 20 December 2020) was a Bangladeshi author, poet and former director general of Bangla Academy.

He was elected director general of Bangla Academy from 1982 to 1986. His list of poetry books include Nimagna, Ki Kore Pabo, Mati Here Jai, Shawla o Dinghi, Pure Pure, Ai din Mitthey, Bandana Bristir and Peyecho Ki. He was awarded Bangla Academy Literary Award in 2007 and Bangla Academy Rabindra Award in 2014.

== Life and career ==
Monzur-I-Mowla was born in 1940.

He was elected as the director general of Bangla Academy, the leading institution of publications in Bangladesh. The month-long Ekushey Boi Mela book festival throughout the entire February month was introduced by him during his tenure at the Bangla Academy as its director general in the early 1980s.

As the DG of Bangla Academy, he introduced some revolutionary movements in Bengali culture. He organised the first National folklore workshops. He also introduced several fellowships, like Aroj Ali Matubbar and Khoda Box Sai. He was the first who published their books. Mawla also renovated the historic Burdwan House building.

He has ventured into publishing books like 'History of Bengali Literature', 'Davidson's Medical Science' or Anisuzzaman's 'Old Bengali Prose'. His outstanding work in Bangla Academy is 101 books of 'Bhashashahid Granthomala'. Many books have been published in this series which were new as subjects. Many have written in this series, who later gained special acquaintance on the subject. Administrator-Researcher-Editor-Translator-Poet Manzoor Maula has written two plays - 'Ami Nai' and 'Jallianwala Bagh'. As the editor of one of his most famous books on Rabindranath Tagore, he published 151 books on Tagore in his centenary year. Monzur-I-Mowla has written a book called 'Nastaneer' based on Sudhindranath Dutt's book 'Dashami'. He translated Henrik Ibsen's plays Brand, Elliott's Sweeney and The Rock, Murder in the Church.

He was also a politician. As a secretary, Mawla served in various government ministries. As parliament secretary, Mawla rebuked Nurul Huda, joint secretary at the Bangladesh Parliament Secretariat, refused to work with Mahbub Talukdar who had been recently appointed to the Secretariat to the office of the leader of the house Sheikh Hasina. Mawla called Huda's action "insubordination". He then served as the Parliament secretary from 11 September 1997 to 30 September 2000.

== Awards ==
- Bangla Academy Literary Award (2007)
- Bangla Academy Rabindra Award (2014)
- Ahsan Habib Smrity Puroshkar

== Death ==
Monzur-I-Mowla was diagnosed with COVID-19 during the COVID-19 pandemic in Bangladesh on 5 December 2020 and was hospitalised consequently. Later, his condition deteriorated and he died at 9:15 pm on 20 December 2020 at the age of 80. President of Bangladesh Abdul Hamid expressed his grief and condolences on his death. The Prime Minister of Bangladesh, Sheikh Hasina also mourned his death.
