= Belal Chowdhury =

Bangladeshi poet (1938–2018)

- বেলাল চৌধুরী
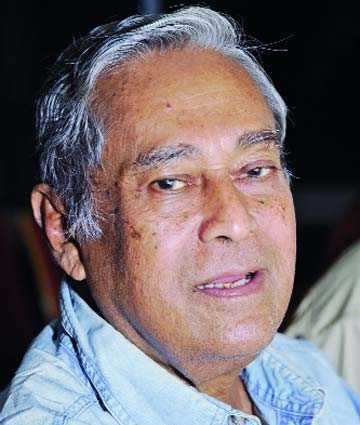
- Chowdhury in 2012
- Born: 12 November 1938; Feni Sadar, Bengal Presidency, British India
- Died: 24 April 2018 (aged 79); Dhaka, Bangladesh

Belal Chowdhury (12 November 1938 – 24 April 2018) was a Bangladeshi poet. He was awarded the Bangla Academy Literary Award in 1984, the Mazharul Islam Poetry Award in 2013 and Ekushey Padak in 2014.

== Career ==
Chowdhury served Bharat Bichitra as its editor published from Indian embassy in Dhaka. He was also an editor of the Shaptahik Sandwip published by Rupali Group and Krittibas, a Bengali poetry magazine, edited by Sunil Gangopadhyay.
