= Suddhananda Mahathero =

Bangladeshi Buddhist monk (1933–2020)

- শুদ্ধানন্দ মহাথের
- Born: 15 January 1933; Uttar Padua, Rangunia, Chittagong District, Bengal Presidency, British India
- Died: 3 March 2020 (aged 87); Dhaka, Bangladesh
- Parents: Bangha Chandra Barua (father); Reboti Bala Barua (mother)
- Awards: Ekushey Padak

H H Sanghanayaka Suddhananda Mahathero (15 January 1933 – 3 March 2020) was a Bangladeshi Buddhist monk. He was awarded Ekushey Padak in 2012 by the Government of Bangladesh for his contribution to social work. He served as the President of Bangladesh Bouddha Kristi Prachar Sangha.

== Awards ==
- Atish Dipankar Gold Award (1997)
- Fellow of Bangla Academy (2005)
- Mahatma Gandhi Peace Award (2007)
- Ekushey Padak (2012)
- Peace Gold Medal (India)

== Death ==
Mahathero died on 3 March 2020 at LabAid Hospital, Dhaka.
