= Fatema Tuz Zohra =

Bangladeshi Nazrul Geeti singer

- ফাতেমা তুজ জোহরা
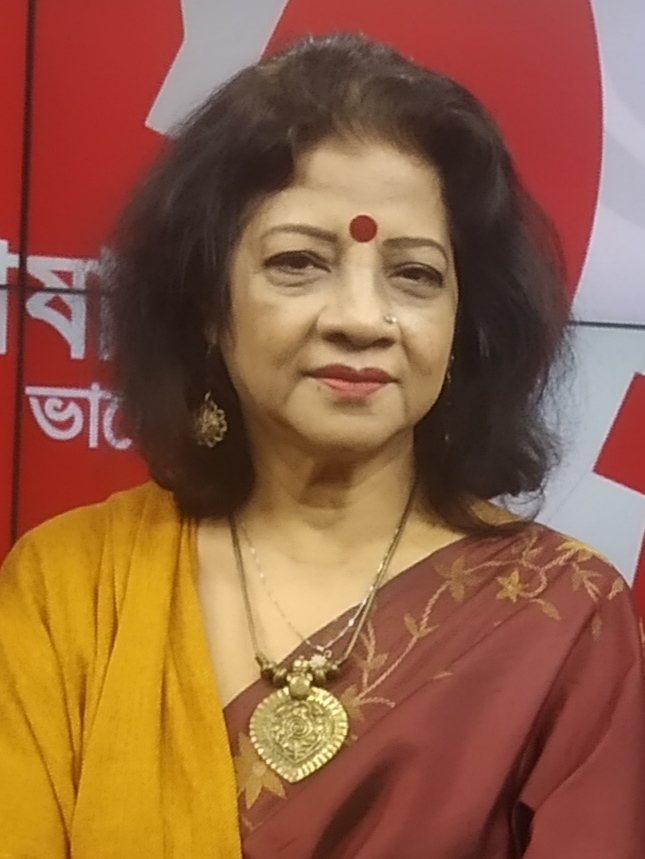
- Zohra in 2021
- Born: Joypurhat, Bogra District
- Occupation: Singer
- Awards: Ekushey Padak

Fatema Tuz Zohra is a Bangladeshi Nazrul Geeti singer. She was awarded Ekushey Padak in 2006 by the government of Bangladesh. She sings Nazrul Geeti and modern songs. She has acted in television dramas, and performed in various programs. She published a book of poems, a book of two rhymes, a novel, a collection of stories and columns and a music book with Nazrul's songs.

== Early life and career ==
Zohra was born in Joypurhat, Bogra District. She studied in Joypurhat Government Girls High School. She debuted her music career in 1963. She took lessons from Habibur Rahman Shathi and Mithun Dey.

=== Acting ===
Zohra is an actress. In 1974, she started acting in television dramas through the play Laguk Dola directed by B.M Harun. In this play, she played the role of a mute girl. Khaled Khan was opposite her. She later acted in the play Shiulimala based on the story written by Kazi Nazrul Islam and the plays Last Night (2012) and Ghater Kotha (2016) based on the story written by Rabindranath Tagore. As of 2014, she has performed in 11 drama plays.

== Awards ==
- Ekushey Padak (2006)
- Nazrul Award (2017)
- Bangla Academy Honorary Fellow (2014)
- Theatre Honoring
- Press Club Award
- Sher-e-Bangla Memorial Medal
- Freedom Forum Honoring
- Pure Stage Award from London
- British Columbia Honoring Award
- Nazrul University Award
