= Bangla Academy =

Bangladesh's national language authority

- বাংলা একাডেমি
- Logo of the Bangla Academy

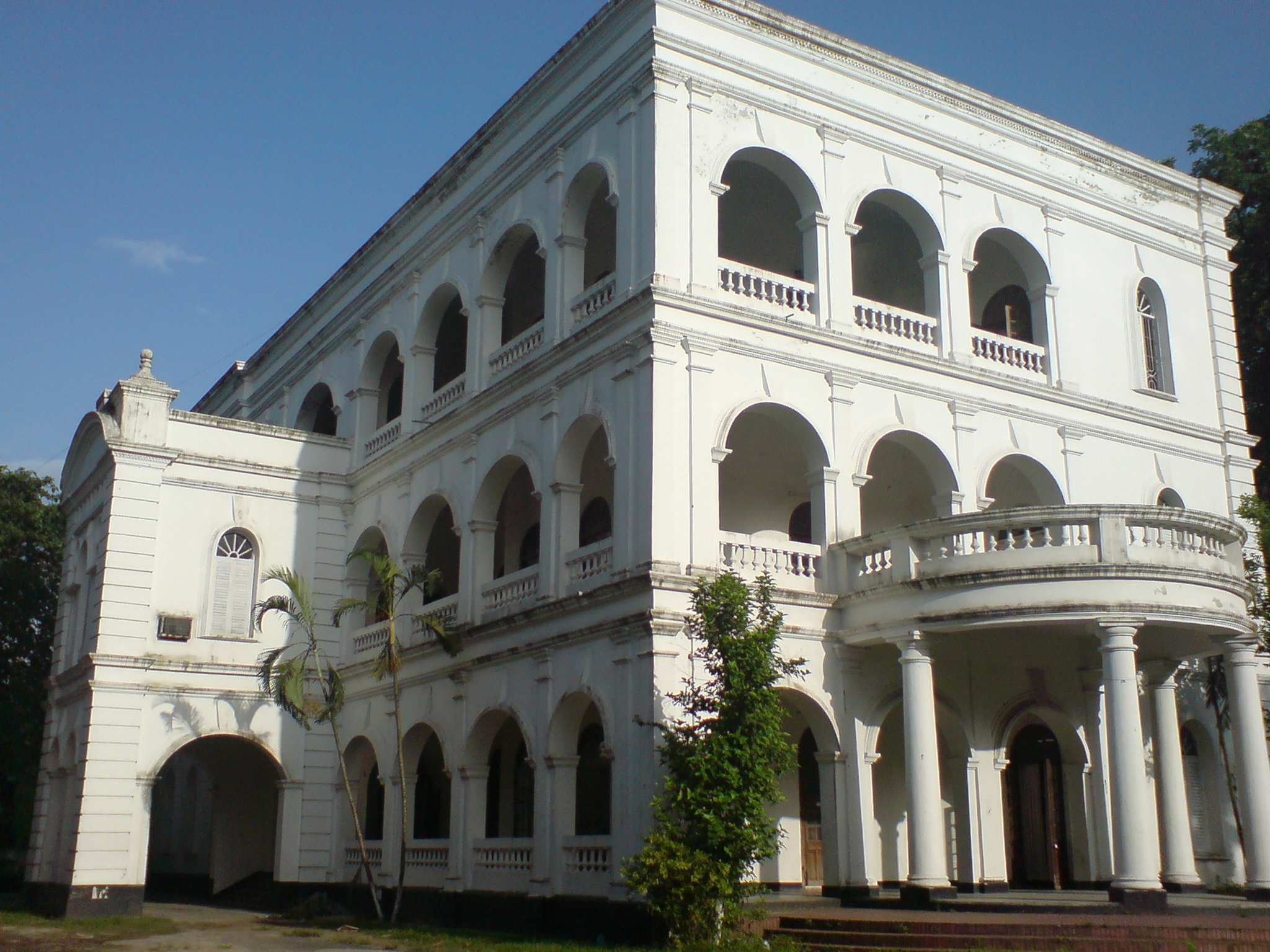
- The Bangla Academy's main office, located in the Burdwan House
- Abbreviation: BA
- Pronunciation: [ˈbaŋla ˈækaˌɖemi]
- Named after: Académie Française
- Formation: 3 December 1955; 70 years ago
- Type: Autonomous institution
- Legal status: Language regulator
- Purpose: Research, publication and translation related to the Bengali language, literature and culture
- Headquarters: Burdwan House
- Location: Kazi Nazrul Islam Avenue, Dhaka, Bangladesh
- Region served: Bangladesh
- Official language: Bengali
- Director General: Mohammad Azam
- President: Vacant
- Parent organization: Ministry of Cultural Affairs
- Funding: Government of Bangladesh
- Website: banglaacademy.gov.bd

The Bangla Academy (Bengali: বাংলা একাডেমি, pronounced [baŋla ækaɖemi]) is the official regulatory body of the Bengali language in Bangladesh. It is an autonomous institution funded by the government of Bangladesh that fosters the Bengali language, literature and culture, works to develop and implement national language policy and conducts original research in Bengali. Established in 1955, it is located in the Burdwan House in Shahbagh, Dhaka, on the grounds of the University of Dhaka and Suhrawardy Udyan. The Bangla Academy hosts the annual Ekushey Book Fair.

== History ==
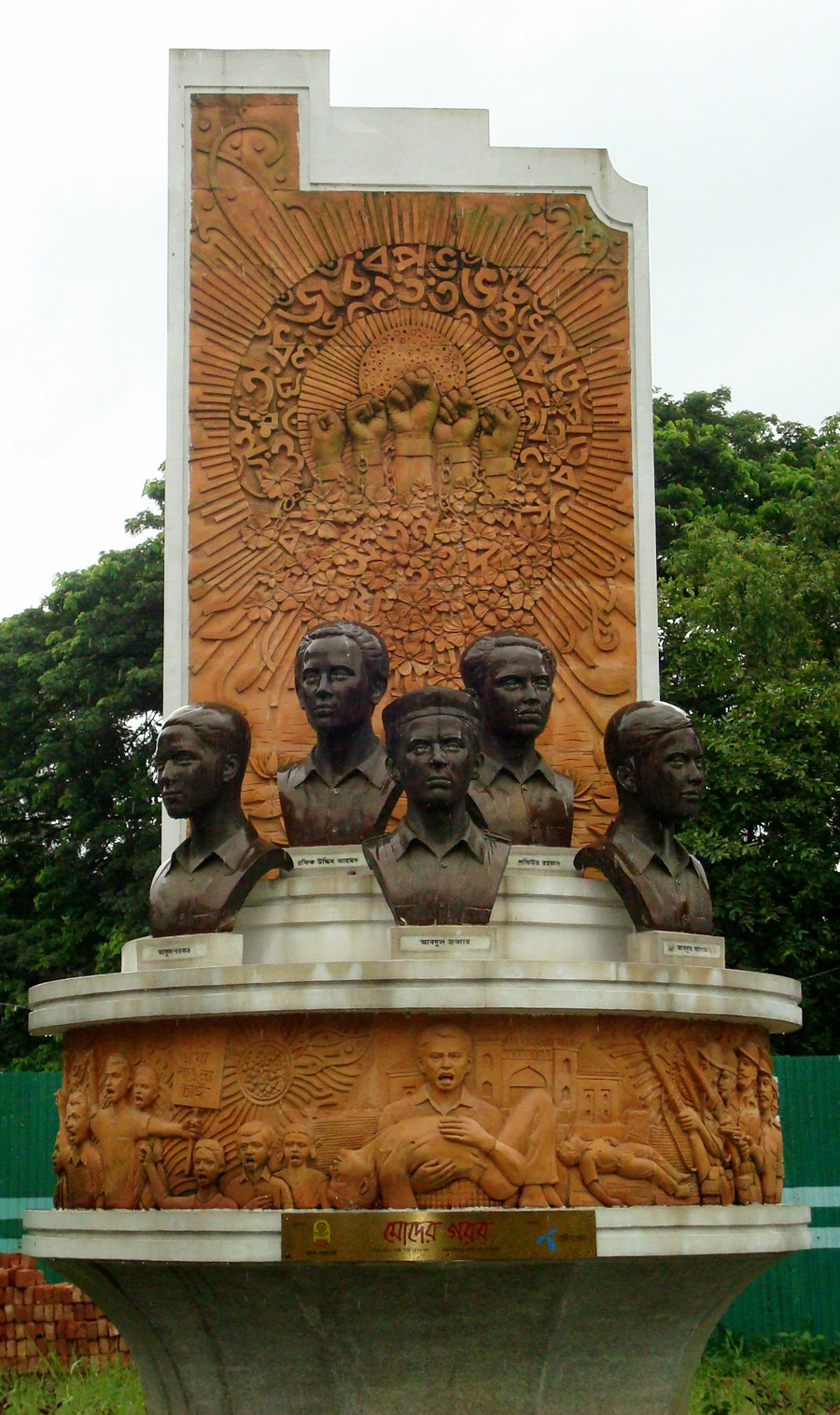
Moder Gorob, depicting the language movement martyrs, is one of the features of Bangla Academy.

The importance of establishing an organisation for Bengali language was first emphasised by the linguist Muhammad Shahidullah. Later, following the Language movement, on 27 April 1952, the All Party National Language Committee decided to demand the establishment of an organisation for the promotion of Bengali language. During the 1954 parliamentary elections, the United Front's 21-point manifesto stated that, "The prime minister from the United Front will dedicate the Bardhaman House, also known as Burdwan House, for establishing a research center for the Bengali language". The building was the official residence of the Chief Minister of East Pakistan, Nurul Amin during the Language movement and part of the University of Dhaka before that. Following the election success of the Front, the education minister Syed Azizul Haque placed the order to fulfill this promise.

In 1955, the government formed a committee to expedite the process. The committee was composed of leading intellectuals like Muhammad Shahidullah, Qazi Motahar Hossain, S.M. Bhattacharya, W. H. Shadani, and Muhammad Barkatullah. On 3 December 1955, the Chief Minister of East Bengal, Abu Hussain Sarkar, inaugurated the institute. Barkatullah acted as the Special Officer in charge. In 1956, Muhammad Enamul Haque took over as the first director.

In 1957, an act of the parliament formally established the funding source and the Government support for the institute. The first book published by the academy was Laili Maznu, an epic by the medieval poet Dawlat Ujir Bahram Khan, and edited by Ahmed Sharif. The first fellow of the academy was the poet Farrukh Ahmed.

The publication division was established in early 1957; the research, culture and library divisions and translation division were set in 1958 and 1961 respectively.

After the independence of Bangladesh, the director's position was renamed Director General. Mazharul Islam, head of Bangla Department of Rajshahi University, was the first Director General of the institute. On 19 September 2008, a new 8-storey building, containing a 500-capacity auditorium and a 100-capacity seminar room, opened next to the main building.

== Structure ==
The functions and structure of the institute were devised on the model of the French Academy.

=== Divisions ===
1. Research, compilation and folklore
2. Language, literature, culture and publication
3. Textbook
4. Planning and training

== Activities ==
The main task of the academy is to conduct research on Bengali language, culture, and history, and to publish Bengali literary and research work.

To commemorate the Language movement and the Language martyr's day, the academy organizes the month-long Ekushey Book Fair, the largest book fair in the country. It was introduced by former director general Monzur-I-Mowla in 1979.

== Criticism ==
In recent years, Bangla Academy has been widely criticized for allowing different organizations to arrange events in English and denigrating Bengali in the premise of Bangla Academy, which is a violation of the vision of the institution. "The Academy has misused a lot of funds in producing useless books, books that are unoriginal," opines Salimullah Khan. Khan is of the opinion that the academy is short on original publications long on dross. He believes that both in research and in the field of creative writing, originality must be given priority. He also adds that most of the problems lie in the process of selection. The selection process the crucial decision to ditch one manuscript to pick another that will be added to the long list of academy publications, is faulty and in dire need of revision.

== Awards conferred by Bangla Academy ==
Bangla Academy confers the following awards annually or biennially.

=== Rabindra Award ===
This award is the recognition of research of Rabindra literature and lifelong pursuit of Rabindra music since 2010.

- 2010 – Kalim Sharafi and Sanjida Khatun
- 2011 – Ahmed Rafiq and Ajit Roy
- 2012 – Anisur Rahman, Fahmida Khatun and Iffat Ara Dewan
- 2013 – Karunamaya Goswami and Papia Sarwar
- 2014 – Manzoore Mawla and Rezwana Chowdhury Bannya
- 2015 – Sanat Kumar Saha and Sadi Mohammad
- 2016 – Syed Akram Hossain and Tapan Mahmud
- 2017 – Hayat Mamud and Mita Haque
- 2018 – Abul Momen and Fahim Hossain Chowdhury
- 2019 – Safiuddin Ahmed, Begum Akhtar Kamal, and Iqbal Ahmed
- 2020 – Sadhan Ghosh
- 2021 – Atiur Rahman
- 2022 – Siddika Mahmuda
- 2023 – Sheela Momen
- 2024 – Bhishmadev Chowdhury and Laisa Ahmed

=== Mazharul Islam Poetry Award ===
This award is conferred to the Bangladeshi poets since 2010.

=== S'adat Ali Akhand Literature Award ===
This is a literature award commemorating the writer S'adat Ali Akhand.

- 1990 – Abdul Hoque
- 1991 – Abu Hena Mustafa Kamal
- 1992 – Ahmed Sofa
- 1993 – Kazi Abdul Mannan
- 1994 – Hasan Hafizur Rahman
- 1995 – Aroj Ali Matubbar
- 1996 – Akhteruzzaman Elias
- 1997 – Kayes Ahmed
- 1998 – Sanjida Khatun
- 1999 – Sanat Kumar Saha
- 2000 – Sufi Motahar Hossein
- 2001 – Haripada Datta
- 2002 – Mannan Hira
- 2003 – Rizia Rahman
- 2004 – Abdul Hafiz
- 2005 – Shamsul Islam
- 2006 – Noyon Rahman
- 2007 – Abdul Karim
- 2008 – Sardar Fazlul Karim
- 2009 – Sanaul Huq
- 2010 – Mahadev Saha
- 2011 – Khondokar Sirajul Hoque
- 2012 – Jahanara Nowshin
- 2013 – Quazi Rosy
- 2014 – Fazlul Alam
- 2015 – Kaysul Hoque
- 2016 – Hossain Uddin Hossain
- 2017 – Saifuddin Chowdhury and Shafiul Alam
- 2018 – Abid Azad
- 2019 – Papri Rahman
- 2020 – Zulfikar Matin
- 2021 – Tasikul Islam Raja
- 2022 – Israil Khan
- 2023 – Omar Kaiser
- 2025 – Hafiz Rashid Khan

=== Kabir Chowdhury Children Literature Award ===
- 2004 – Ekhlasuddin Ahmed
- 2006 – Anwara Syed Haq
- 2008 – Foyez Ahmad
- 2010 – Sukumar Barua
- 2013 – Mahmudullah
- 2015 – Akhtar Hossain
- 2017 – Hayat Mamud
- 2020 – Shahriar Kabir
- 2022 – Sirajul Farid

=== Meher Kabir Science Literature Award ===
Bangla Academy has been conferring Meher Kabir Science Literature Award bi-annually since 2005 commemorating Meher Kabir (1919–2018), an academic and a litterateur. This award recognizes overall contribution of notable writers in science literature. The prize money of Tk 1,00,000, a certificate and a memento are presented to the award-winning writer in the annual general meeting of Bangla Academy. The initial fund was provided by National Professor Kabir Chowdhury, also the husband of Meher Kabir.

- 2005 – Kazi Zakir Hossain
- 2007 – Muhammad Ibrahim
- 2012 – A. M. Harun-ar-Rashid
- 2014 – Ajoy Roy
- 2017 – Ali Asgar
- 2019 – Shishir Kumar Bhattacharjee
- 2021 – Enam Ul Haque
- 2023 – ABM Abdullah
- 2025 – Khosru Chowdhury

=== Halima-Sarfuddin Science Writer Award ===
This award is conferred biannually following the Bengali calendar.

- 1397–1398: Md Lutfor Rahman and Md Alamgir Hossain for Computer Science
- 1401–1402: Atul Kumar Pal for Exportable fisheries of Bangladesh and Shahidullah Mridha for Bay of Bengal: Biodiversity, Marine Science and Marine Resources
- 1405–1406: Farseem Mannan Mohammedy for Jyoti: Introduction to Physics
- 1407–1408: Hafizuddin Ahmed for Deadly disease SARS
- 1409–1410: Basudev Kumar Das for Environment: Chemical composition and pollution
- 1411–1412: Ferdousi Begum for Why am I like my parents?
- 1415–1416: J. B. M. Jafar Sadeq for Clinical Skin, Leprosy, Venereal Diseases and Their Treatment
- 1418–1419: Dwijen Sharma for Talking about trees and flowers
- 1420–1421: Asif for At the turning point of history on the path of evolution
- 1422–1423: Zayed Farid for Plant Nature
- 1424–1425: Mukaram Hossain for Nisarga Akhyan
- 1426–1427: Saumitra Chakravarty
- 1428–1429: Abdul Gaffar
- 1430–1431: Safiq Islam for Goniter Rajye Anondobhromon

=== Syed Waliullah Award ===
Bangla Academy confers this award commemorating the writer Syed Waliullah. The award consists of a certificate, a crest of honour and Tk 50,000. The award was formally called "Bangla Academy Probashi Lekhak Award" (lit: Bangla Academy Expatriate Writer Award).

- 2014 – Iqbal Hasan and Syed Iqbal
- 2015 – Manju Islam and Fras Bhattacharya
- 2016 – Shamim Azad and Nazmun Nesa Peyari
- 2017 – Masud Khan and Mujib Irm

=== Litterateur Mohammad Barkatullah Essay Award ===
- 2017 – Ahmed Rafiq
- 2018 – Sirajul Islam Chowdhury
- 2019 – Farhad Khan
- 2020 – Rafique Kaisar
- 2021 – Sirajul Islam
- 2022 – Razia Sultana
- 2023 – Anupam Sen
- 2025 – Mansur Musa

=== Poet Jasimuddin Literature Award ===
Bangla Academy introduced this biennial literary award in 2019. The winner receives Tk 2,00,000 and a crest as part of the award.

- 2019 – Nirmalendu Goon
- 2021 – Ahmed Rafiq
- 2023 – Mohammad Rafiq

=== Professor Momtazuddin Ahmed Natyajan Award ===
This award was introduced as Adhyapak Momtazuddin Ahmed Natyajan Puraskar in 2021 after the death of dramatist Momtazuddin Ahmed. (Note: The Adhyapak Momtazuddin Ahmed Natyajan Puraskar–2019 was awarded to Asaduzzaman Noor by a different organization before Bangla Academy started hosting it since 2021) (Note: A similar sounding award Momtazuddin Ahmed Natyakar Puroshkar is conferred by a separate organization since 2020)

- 2021 – Ferdousi Mazumder
- 2022 – Mamunur Rashid
- 2023 – Ramendu Majumdar
- 2025 – Tariq Anam Khan

=== Abu Rushd Literature Award ===
This award was introduced in 2021 as a tribute to academic and writer Abu Rushd Matinuddin to recognize Bangladeshi authors.

- 2021 – Anwara Syed Haq and Wasi Ahmed
- 2023 – Mohammad Harun-Ur-Rashid
- 2025 – Shibabrata Barman

=== Rabeya Khatun Fiction Award ===
- 2022 – Jyoti Prakash and Swakrita Noman
- 2025 – Subrata Barua and Anisur Rahman

== Presidents ==
Years	President	Profession
1961–1961	Mohammad Akram Khan	Journalist and politician
1962–1963	Mohammad Barkatullah	Writer
1964–1965	Muhammad Qudrat-i-Khuda	Educationist
1969–1971	Syed Murtaza Ali	Writer and historian
1972–1974	Zainul Abedin	Painter
1975–1977	Syed Murtaza Ali	
1977–1979	Syed Ali Ahsan	Poet and educator
1980–1982	Abdul Haque Faridi	Islamic scholar
1982–1983	Abu Mohammed Habibullah	
1986–1990	Abdullah-Al-Muti	Educationist
1990–1992	Gazi Shamsur Rahman	Lawyer
1993–1994	Abdur Rahman Chowdhury	Justice
1994–1996	Gazi Shamsur Rahman	
1996–1999	Shamsur Rahman	Poet
1999–2002	Anisuzzaman	
2002–2006	Wakil Ahmed	
2007–2009	M Harunur Rashid	
2009–2011	Kabir Chowdhury	
2011–2020	Anisuzzaman	
2020–2021	Shamsuzzaman Khan	Folklorist
2021–2021	Rafiqul Islam	
2022–2024	Selina Hossain	Novelist
2024–2026	Abul Kashem Fazlul Haq	Educationist

== List of honorary fellows ==
As of 2022, there are 193 persons made honorary fellows by the academy.

- Mohammad Akram Khan
- Muhammad Shahidullah
- Golam Mustafa
- Jasimuddin
- Shamsunnahar Mahmud
- Zainul Abedin
- Khan Bahadur Ahsanullah
- Sheikh Reazudin Ahmed
- Sheikh Habibor Rahman
- Nurunnesa Khatun
- Mozammel Huq
- Khoda Box
- Aroj Ali Matubbar
- Mozibor Rahman Biswas
- Mahbubul Alam Chowdhury
- Manindra Nath Nayak
- Sheikh Lutfor Rahman
- Kamaluddin Ahmed
- Shafiuddin Ahmed
- Quamrul Hassan
- Abu Sayeed Chowdhury
- Abdul Ahad
- A R Mallick
- Shah Fazlur Rahman
- Abdur Razzaq
- Muhammad Ibrahim
- Muhammad Shamsul Huq
- Mohammad Nurul Huq
- Dewan Mohammad Azraf
- Abdul Haque Faridi
- Firoza Begum
- Kalim Sharafi
- Khan Sarwar Murshid
- A N M Gaziul Haque
- A.F. Salahuddin Ahmed
- Barin Mazumder
- Lutfar Rahman Sarkar
- Abdul Latif
- Nurjahan Begum
- Sudhin Das
- Ajoy Roy
- Sirajul Islam
- Sohrabuddin Ahmed
- Nazrul Islam
- Rafiqun Nabi
- Amolesh Chandra Mandal

1975

- Mohammad Nasiruddin

2001

- Qayyum Chowdhury
- Mohammad Saidur
- Abdul Halim Boyati
- Abdul Matin
- Tofail Ahmed

2002

- Beggzadi Mahmuda Nasir
- Jamal Nazrul Islam

2003

- Mohammad Ferdous Khan
- Emajuddin Ahamed
- Ferdousi Rahman

2004

- Nurul Islam
- Iqbal Mahmud
- Rahija Khanam Jhunu

2005

- M. Shamsher Ali
- M H Khan
- M Q K Talukdar
- Suddhananda Mahathero
- William Radice

2006

- Quazi Azhar Ali
- Kazi Abdul Fattah
- T A Chowdhury
- Jamilur Reza Choudhury

2007

- M Innas Ali
- A M Harun Ar Rashid
- Mozaffar Ahmed
- M Abul Hashem Khan
- Sohrab Hossain
- Nuruddin Ahmed
- M Kamrul Islam

2008

- Musharraf Hossain
- Khondkar Ibrahim Khaled
- Mizanur Rahman Shelley
- Sultana Kamal
- Mahbub Alam
- Sonia Nishat Amin
- Saidur Rahman Boyati
- Nurul Islam

2009

- Nurul Islam
- Amanul Huq
- Imdad Hossain
- Rawshan Ara Bachchu
- A B M Musa
- Ataus Samad
- Abul Maal Abdul Muhith
- M. Amir-ul Islam
- M Mahbubur Rahman
- A B M Abdul Latif Miah
- Akbar Ali Khan
- Ferdousi Mazumder
- Bibi Russell
- Muhammad Habibullah Pathan
- M Abdus Samad Mandal
- Kazuo Azuma
- Clinton B. Seely

2010

- Atiqul Huq Chowdhury
- A B M Hossain
- Kamal Lohani
- Jamil Chowdhury
- Enamul Huq
- Sahanara Hossen
- Mustafa Zaman Abbasi
- Rashid Talukder
- Ramendu Majumdar
- Laila Hasan
- Farida Parveen

2011

- Amartya Sen
- Sheikh Hasina
- Munshi Abdur Rouf
- Sheikh Hafizur Rahman
- Md. Tafazzul Islam
- Mustafa Monwar
- Rehman Sobhan

2012

- Md. Tafazzul Islam
- Muhiuddin Khan Alamgir
- Mohiuddin Ahmed
- Runa Laila
- M Syeduzzaman
- Murtoza Bashir
- Ramkanai Das
- Pran Gopal Datta
- Atiur Rahman
- Sabina Yasmin

2013

- Syed Hasan Imam
- Monaem Sarker
- Fakir Alamgir
- A. T. M. Shamsul Huda
- Ferdousi Priyabhashini
- Shahadat Hossain Khan
- Nasiruddin Yousuff
- Abul Hasnat

2014

- Partha Pratim Majumder
- Ataur Rahman
- Mohammad Zamir
- A. B. M. Khairul Haque
- Abdul Mannan Choudhury
- Shimul Yousuf
- Fatema Tuz Zohra

2015

- Fazle Hasan Abed
- Mohammed Farashuddin
- Anupam Sen
- Abed Khan
- Abu Mohammad Shapan Adnan
- Mahfuz Anam
- Papia Sarwar

2016

- Toyab Khan
- Alamgir Muhammad Serajuddin
- Abul Kalam Azad Chowdhury
- Rafique Ul Huq
- Rathindranath Roy
- Shaikh Siraj
- Mushtari Shafi

2017

- Iqbal Bahar Chowdhury
- Pratibha Mutsuddi
- ABM Abdullah
- Ainun Nishat
- Nurun Nabi
- Hassan Shahriar
- Dulal Talukder

2018

- Monirul Islam
- Aminul Islam
- Monjulika Chakma
- SM Mohsin
- Samanta Lal Sen
- Rawshan Ara Mustafiz
- Polan Sarkar

2020

- Sarwar Ali
- Nurul Islam Nahid
- Nuh-ul-Alam Lenin
- AK Azad Khan
- Liaquat Ali Lucky
- Jewel Aich
- Manjurul Ahsan Bulbul

2021

- Matia Chowdhury
- Azizur Rahman Aziz
- Valerie Ann Taylor
- Ustad Azizul Islam
- Sheikh Sadi Khan
- M Hamid
- Golam Quddus

2022

- AAMS Arefin Siddique
- Mohammad Ali Reza Khan
- Md Zakir Hossain
- Nasir Ali Mamun
- Hamiduzzaman Khan
- Jayanta Chattopadhyay
- Selina Hayat Ivy

2023

- Muzzammil Husain Monju
- AK Seram
- Alam Dewan
- Tanvir Mokammel
- Akku Chowdhury
- Falguni Hamid
- Halida Hanum Akhter
