= Iffat Ara Dewan =

Bangladeshi singer and painter

- ইফফাত আরা দেওয়ান
- Education: University of Dhaka
- Website: iffataradewan.com

Iffat Ara Dewan is a Bangladeshi singer and painter. She was awarded the Bangla Academy Rabindra Award in 2012.

== Early life and career ==
Dewan took formal training in music at Chhayanaut during 1963–1968. She was trained by Waheedul Haq and Sanjida Khatun. She completed her bachelor's degree in economics from the University of Dhaka in 1975. She attended an art course at Byam Shaw School of Art in London in 1992.

Dewan's first record by EMI, at 45 rpm featured two Rabindra Sangeet songs from Dhaka and Kolkata in 1970 – "Ami Rupey Tomai Bholabo Na" and "Probhu Bolo Bolo Kobey".

Dewan started painting in 1990 and her first solo exhibition was held in 1992 at the German Cultural Center in Dhaka. She showcased her work in multiple solo exhibitions, including one in Paris, France.

Dewan is a member of the executive committee of Chhayanaut.

== Works ==
Albums

- Hoytho Tomar-i Jonno (2012)
- Tumi Ami Dui Teer (2013)

== Awards ==
- Bangladesh Shilpakala Academy Award (2007)
- Citycell – Channel I Music Award for Rabindra Sangeet (2011)
- Bangla Academy Rabindra Award (2012)
