= Mustafa Nur-Ul Islam =

Bangladeshi academic

- মুস্তাফা নূরউল ইসলাম
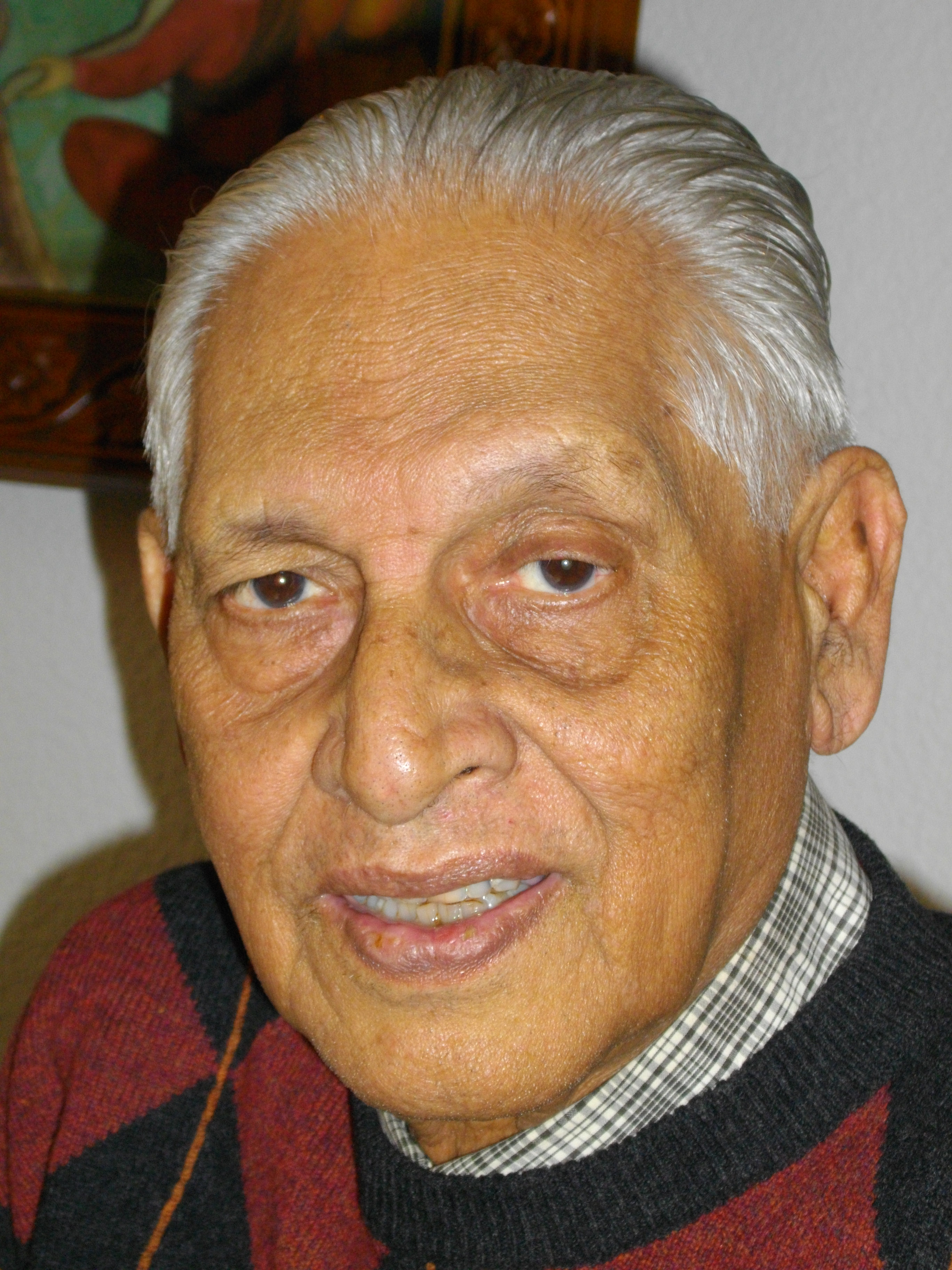
- Nur-Ul Islam in 2009

Director General of Bangla Academy
- In office 6 June 1975 – 5 May 1976
- Preceded by: Nilima Ibrahim
- Succeeded by: Ashraf Siddiqui

Personal details
- Born: 1 May 1927 Bogra District, Bengal Presidency, British India
- Died: 9 May 2018 (aged 91) Dhaka, Bangladesh
- Education: PhD
- Alma mater: University of Calcutta; University of Dhaka; University of London
- Awards: Ekushey Padak (1981); Independence Day Award (2010)

Mustafa Nur-Ul Islam (1 May 1927 – 9 May 2018) was a Bangladeshi academic. In 2011, he was appointed a National Professor of Bangladesh. He was awarded Ekushey Padak in 1981 and Independence Day Award in 2010 by the Government of Bangladesh. He was the founder director of Bangladesh Shilpakala Academy, the Director General of Bangla Academy and the Chairman of Bangladesh National Museum. In 2011, he was appointed a National Professor. He edited a literary magazine named Sundaram.

== Early life ==
Nur-Ul Islam was born on 1 May 1927 to the writer Sadat Ali Akhund and Rabeya Khatun into a family of Akhunds in the village of Chingashpur, adjacent to Mahasthangarh in Bogra District.

== Education and career ==
Nur-Ul Islam graduated from the University of Calcutta in 1948 and got his post-graduate degree from the University of Dhaka and PhD from the London University. He started the career in journalism in 1951. In his career, he taught at St. Gregor's and Edward College under University of Rajshahi and Jahangirnagar University. He was the Director General of Bangladesh Shilpakala Academy and Bangla Academy and the Chairman of the Bangladesh National Museum. His published book count is almost half-century. He added special dimensions to the presentation of television shows. As the assistant editor, he was associated with the first issue of The Sangbad. Works Daily Millat.
