= Saimum Series =

Islamic Thriller Series in Bengali

The Saimum Series (Bengali: সাইমুম সিরিজ) is a series of novels written by Bangladeshi author Abul Asad. The first book in the Saimum Series, titled Operation Tel Aviv (Bengali: অপারেশন তেলআবিব-১), was published in 1976.

== Plot ==
Ahmad Musa is the protagonist of the series. The first book briefly describes his past, including the killing of his family and his flight from his homeland, Xinjiang. He attempts to help Palestine achieve its independence by rescuing Muslims and unraveling the mystery behind the World Trade Center disaster. He fights against the Ku Klux Klan and seeks to dismantle Zionist conspiracies in Palestine, the United States, and Turkey.

== Series of books ==
The titles of the Saimum Series, published by Bangla Shahitta Parishad, are:

1. অপারেশন তেলআবিব-১ (Operation Tel Aviv-1)
2. অপারেশন তেলআবিব-২ (Operation Tel Aviv-2)
3. মিন্দানাওয়ের বন্দী
4. পামিরের আর্তনাদ
5. রক্তাক্ত পামির
6. রক্ত সাগর পেরিয়ে
7. তিয়েনশানের ওপারে
8. সিংকিয়াং থেকে ককেশাস
9. ককেশাসের পাহাড়ে
10. বলকানের কান্না
11. দানিয়ুবের দেশে
12. কর্ডোভার অশ্রু
13. আন্দালুসিয়ার প্রান্তরে
14. গোয়াদেলকুইভারে নতুন স্রোত
15. আবার সিংকিয়াং
16. মধ্য এশিয়ায় কালো মেঘ
17. ব্ল্যাক ক্রসের কবলে
18. ব্ল্যাক ক্রসের মুখোমুখি
19. ক্রস এবং ক্রিসেন্ট
20. অন্ধকার আফ্রিকায়
21. কঙ্গোর কালো বুকে
22. অদৃশ্য আতঙ্ক
23. রাজচক্র
24. জারের গুপ্তধন
25. আটলান্টিকের ওপারে
26. ক্যারিবিয়ানের দ্বীপদেশে
27. মিসিসিপির তীরে
28. আমেরিকার এক অন্ধকারে
29. আমেরিকায় আরেক যুদ্ধ
30. এক নিউ ওয়ার্ল্ড
31. ফ্রি আমেরিকা
32. অক্টোপাশের বিদায়
33. সুরিনামের সংকটে
34. সুরিনামে মাফিয়া
35. নতুন গুলাগ
36. গুলাগ অভিযান
37. গুলাগ থেকে টুইনটাওয়ার
38. ধ্বংস টাওয়ার
39. ধ্বংস টাওয়ারের নীচে
40. কালাপানির আন্দামানে
41. আন্দামান ষড়যন্ত্র
42. ডুবো পাহাড়
43. পাত্তানীর সবুজ অরণ্যে
44. ব্লাক ঈগলের সন্ত্রাস
45. বসফরাসের আহ্বান
46. রোমেলি দুর্গে
47. বসফরাসে বিস্ফোরণ
48. মাউন্ট আরারাতের আড়ালে
49. বিপদে আনাতোলিয়া
50. একটি দ্বীপের সন্ধানে
51. প্যাসেফিকের ভয়ঙ্কর দ্বীপে
52. ক্লোন ষড়যন্ত্র
53. রাইন থেকে অ্যারেন্ডসী
54. আবার আমেরিকায়
55. ডেথ ভ্যালী
56. আর্মেনিয়া সীমান্তে
57. আতংকের দিভিন উপত্যকা
58. রত্ন দ্বীপ
59. বিপন্ন রত্নদ্বীপ
60. হুই উইঘুরের হৃদয়ে
61. ড্রাগন ভয়ংকর
62. আবার আফ্রিকার অন্ধকারে
63. লেক ট্যাঙ্গরিকার তীরে
64. বিপদে বুজুমবুরা
65. শান্তির দ্বীপে সংঘাত

== Saimum Series Unicode Project ==
The volunteer Saimum Series Unicode Project (সাইমুম সিরিজ ইউনিকোড প্রোজেক্ট) has published almost all of the Saimum Series in Unicode Bengali. This project aims to spread the Saimum Series internationally.
