= Abul Asad =

Bangladeshi writer and journalist

- আবুল আসাদ
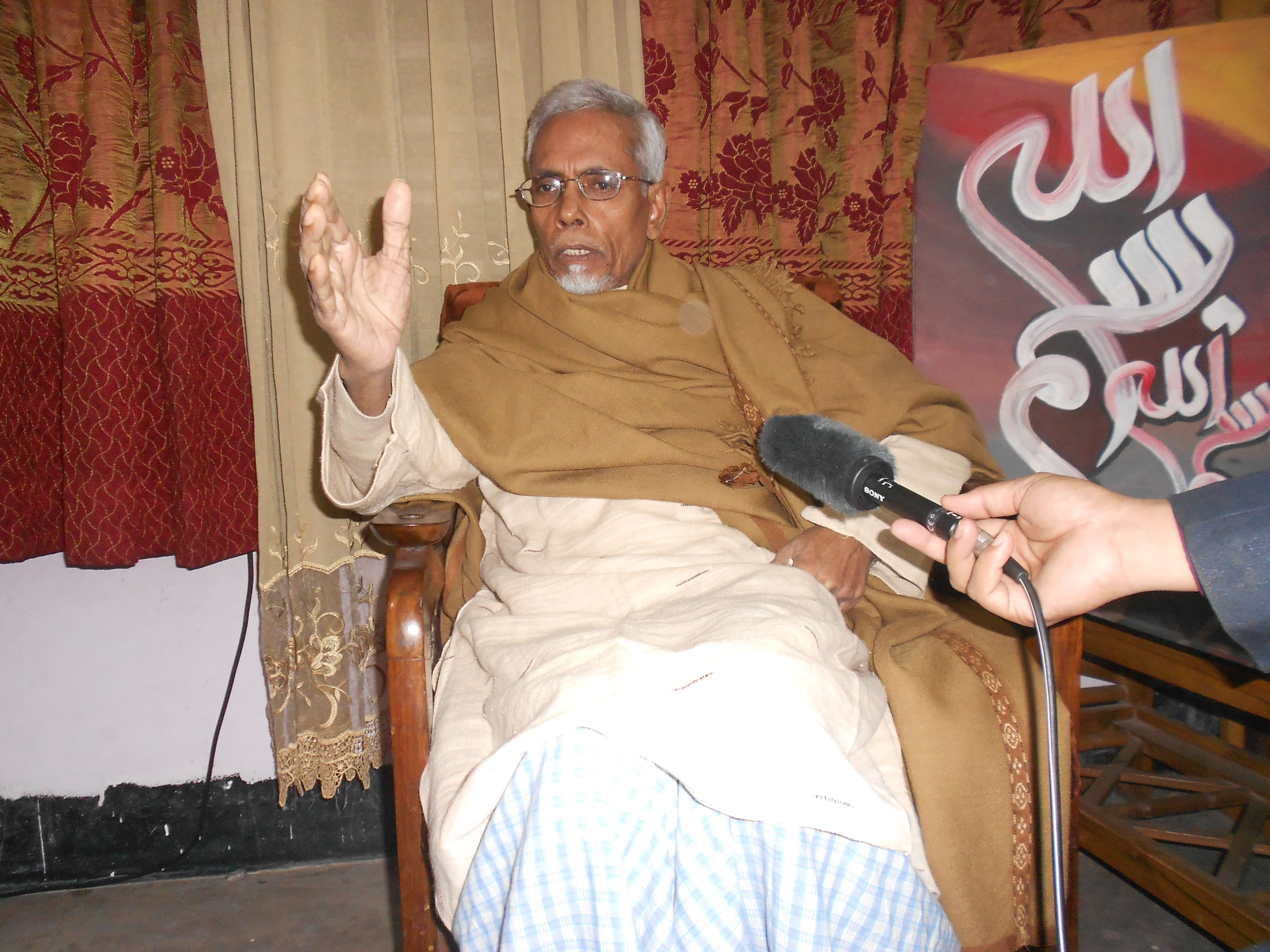
- Asad in 2014
- Born: 5 August 1942 (age 84); Rajshahi, Bengal Presidency, British India
- Citizenship: Bangladeshi
- Education: University of Rajshahi
- Occupations: Journalist, author, publisher of the Daily Sangram, cultural organiser
- Writing career
- Language: Bengali
- Period: 1970 – Present
- Subject: History
- Notable work: Saimum Series

Abul Asad (born 1942) is a Bangladeshi writer and journalist. He was the editor of one of the oldest national dailies in Bangladesh, The Daily Sangram. He is admired by Muslim youth of Bangladesh for his thriller series, Saimum Series. He is also known as an Islamic thinker and intellectual in Bangladesh.

Abul Asad's cultural activities are largely guided by patriotism and devotion to Islamic ideology. He is one of the renowned cultural activists, who devoted their intellectual capabilities to nurture cultural and ideological heritage in Bangladesh. He is involved with many socio-cultural and professional organisations. He is the President of Bangla Sahittya Parishad (BSP), Chairman of Bangladesh Islamic Centre (BIC). He was a director of Bangladesh Sangbad Sangstha (BSS) and a member of Bangladesh Press Council.

His regular sub-editorial 'Durbin' has been receiving widespread appreciation.

Although a successful journalist, Abul Asad is more known for his thriller series 'Saimum'. Books of this series added a new dimension to Bengali literature. It combines heritage, passion and ideology, and inspires the reader to devote his/her life, deeds and love to Islam. He started this famous series in 1972 and has published 62 novels so far.

== Early life and education ==
Abul Asad was born on 5 August 1942 at Narashinghpur village in Rajshahi, Bangladesh. He started writing articles and stories while he was a student of Class XI. He gradually became involved in journalism. He continued his studies alongside his activities as a journalist. Abul Asad completed his MA in economics from Rajshahi University. His father, A.K Shamsamul Haque was an Islamic scholar from a madrasah at Benaras in India. His mother's name is Mojida Begum.

== Journalism ==
Abul Asad started his career as a writer and journalist during his student life. He worked as a Rajshahi-based journalist in several dailies and weekly publications. While a student, he wrote columns on politics and culture which were popular, and these set him in his career as a journalist. He began his career in journalism from 17 January 1970 as an assistant editor of The Daily Sangram. In 1981, he took over responsibility as the editor of The Daily Sangram. He is also a columnist and essayist.

== Literature ==
Abul Asad has published several books such as “Kaalo Pochish Er Aage O Pore” and “Eksho Bochor Er Raajniti” on regional history and politics. “Amra Shei Sei Jaati” a three-part series of story-based events in a historical context, and an essay based compilation “Ekush Shotoker Agenda”. His most popular literary work up to date has been the “Saimum Series”. This series showcases literary fiction combining suspense, thrill, Islamic knowledge and morality within historical contexts and settings. Till now, 62 books have been published in this popular series. Presently, Abul Asad continues to write novels along with being the editor of the Daily Sangram.

== Arrest and persecution ==
Abul Asad was arrested on 19 September 2011, Monday, by the Bangladeshi paramilitia force Rapid Action Battalion (RAB) from his residence in connection with his role as editor of The Daily Sangram, which is largely critical of government policies. Police accused him for his alleged connection with street clashes between law enforcers and Jamaat-e-Islami men in Dhaka and elsewhere, and for vandalising vehicles, arson and obstructing the police officers while they are on duty, and he faced charges of 'patronising the violence'. He was granted bail after a police remand and released on 23 September 2011. Former Prime Minister Khaleda Zia of the Bangladesh Nationalist Party, the leading opposition party, firmly condemned his arrest and called for the withdrawal of the “trumped-up” charges brought against him.

In April 2013, Bangladesh Police arrested Mahmudur Rahman, the editor of Amar Desh newspaper, and shut down its printing facilities. Amar Desh journalists attempted to keep printing their newspaper through the printing facilities of the Daily Sangram, and police arrested 19 employees of Sangram printing press. The Committee to Protect Journalists, a New York-based non-profit, condemned this police harassment of the Daily Sangram staff and its editor, Abul Asad.

== Mob-lynching by pro-government group and subsequent arrest In 2019 ==
On 13 December 2019, a group of pro-government activists under the banner of Muktijoddha Monch (Freedom Fighters Platform) gathered and seized the office of Daily Sangram. They burnt several copies of the newspaper, vandalised dozens of computers and other office equipments and furnitures and dragged the editor to the street and tried to force him to apologise in front of the TV cameras on the street for describing an executed Jamaat Leader convicted for war crimes as a 'martyr'.

After the pro-government group assaulted and harassed him, police took over and took him to the police station. He is in prison since then, facing the charge of high treason, under the draconian Digital Security Act 2018. Abul Asad faced 14 years of imprisonment under the act, if the authorities deem his views defamatory or subversive, or 10 years of imprisonment for spreading propaganda on Bangladesh's War of Independence in 1971.

== Books ==
- Eksho Bochorer Rajniti (Hundred years of Politics of Indian Sub-continent)
- Kalo Pochisher Age o Pore (Before and after the twenty-fifth March ninety seventy-one)
- Saimum Series (A series of 63 novels)
- One Eleven er Purbapor Drisshopot (Before and after one-eleven)
- Ekattor Abong Onnanno Probondho (Seventy one and other articles)
- Ekush Shotoker Agenda (Agenda of twenty-first century)
- Jug Shondhikhoner Prithibi (Civilisation - a juncture of the era)
- Somoyer Shakkhi (Witness of Time)
- Amra Sei Se Jati (A series of 3 books)
- Hindu Muslim Manosh (Hindu - Muslim Values)
- Juktorashtro: Dhormo Shomaj (United States: Religion and Society)
