= Syed Akram Hossain =

Bangladeshi scholar

- সৈয়দ আকরম হোসেন
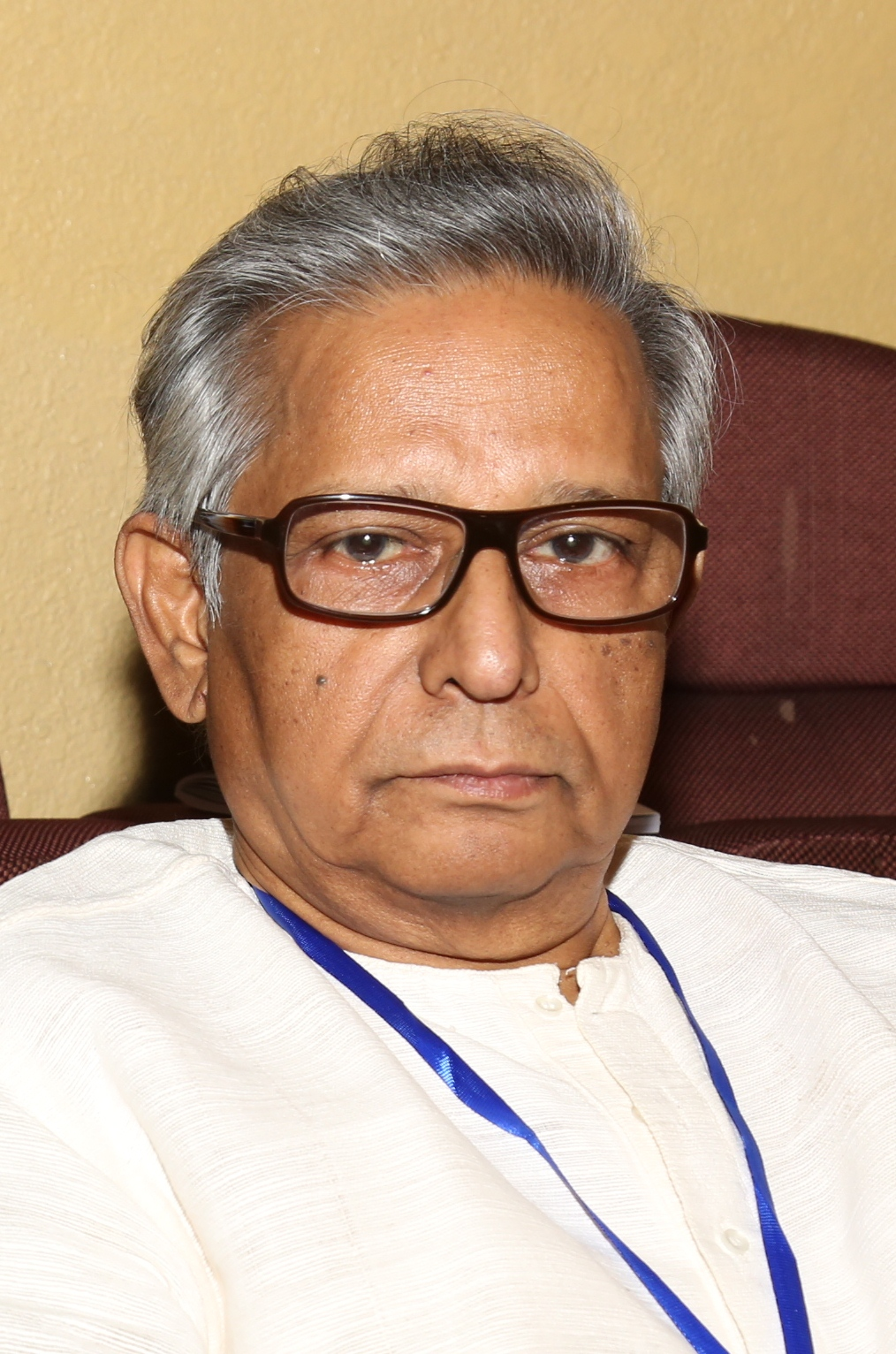
- Hossain receiving Ekushey Padak (Feb 2017)
- Education: PhD
- Occupations: Academic Scholar, Professor

Syed Akram Hossain (Bengali: সৈয়দ আকরম হোসেন) is a Bangladeshi academic scholar. He is known for his research and analysis of Rabindranath Tagore's work, which makes him an important part of Bangladesh literature. He was awarded Rabindra Purushkar in 2016 by the Bangla Academy and Ekushey Padak in 2017 by the Government of Bangladesh in the research category.

== Career ==
Hossain served as a faculty member of the Department of Bengali at the University of Dhaka. He founded Ulukhagra, a modern literary journal and served as its editor.

== Works ==
- Rabindranather Uponnash: Deshkal o Shilparup (1969)
- Rabindranather Uponnash: Cetonalok o Shilparup (1977)
- Rabindranath's Novel: Patterns of Thought and Representation (2015)
