= ABM Abdullah =

Bangladeshi physician and academic

- এবিএম আবদুল্লাহ
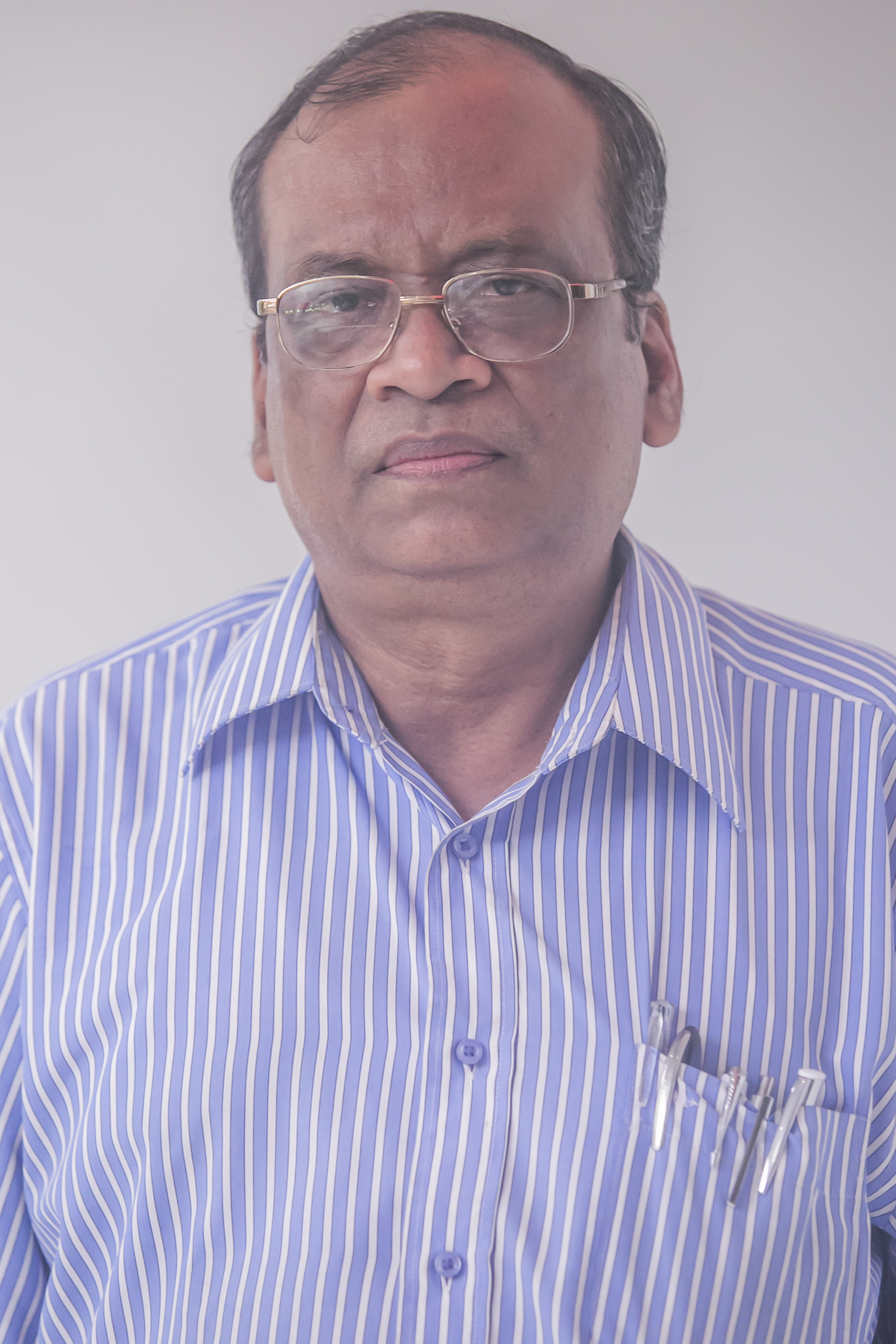
- Abdullah in 2017
- Born: 1954 (age 71–72)
- Education: MBBS, MRCP (UK), FRCP (Edin)
- Occupations: Physician, academic
- Employer: Bangabandhu Sheikh Mujib Medical University
- Awards: Ekushey Padak

ABM Abdullah (born 1954) is a Bangladeshi physician, academic and was the personal physician of the former Prime Minister of Bangladesh, Sheikh Hasina. He was a professor in the Department of Internal Medicine and dean of the Faculty of Medicine at Bangladesh Medical University. He currently works as a Medicine Specialist at Central Hospital Limited, Dhanmondi. He was awarded the Ekushey Padak in 2016 by the Government of Bangladesh.

== Books ==
- —— (2013). Short cases in Clinical Medicine (5th ed.). Elsevier India. ISBN 9788131245972.
- —— (2013). Long Cases in Clinical Medicine. New Delhi: Jaypee Brothers Medical Publishers. ISBN 9789350905029.
- —— (2014). ECG in Medical Practice (4th ed.). New Delhi: Jaypee Brothers Medical Publishers. ISBN 9789351520061.
- —— (2015). Case History and Data Interpretation in Medical Practice (3rd ed.). New Delhi: Jaypee Brothers Medical Publishers. ISBN 9789386107756.
- —— (2016). Radiology in Medical Practice. Elsevier India. ISBN 9788131242490.
- ——. Practical Manual in Clinical Medicine.
