= Iqbal Ahmed (musician) =

Bangladeshi musician

- ইকবাল আহমেদ
- Father: M Ishaque
- Awards: Ekushey Padak

Iqbal Ahmed is a retired Bangladeshi musician. In 2022, he was awarded the Ekushey Padak by the government of Bangladesh for his contribution to music.

== Background ==
Ahmed's father, M Ishaque, was the director of the Jute Research Institute.
