= Shiulimala =

Book by Kazi Nazrul Islam

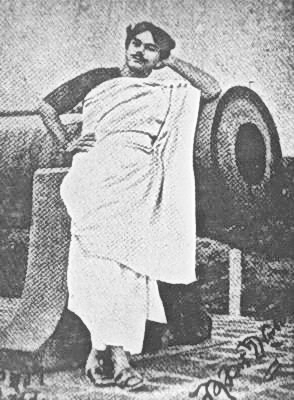
Young Nazrul

Shiulimala (a garland of shiuli) (1931) is a book of short stories, written by Bengali poet and author Kazi Nazrul Islam. This book contains four stories: Padmagokhra, Shiulimala, Ognigiri, Jiner Badsha. These stories are erotic. Here we find romantic Nazrul. However, Nazrul made great contributions in Bengali.
