= Sanat Kumar Saha =

Bangladeshi economist and educator

- সনৎ কুমার সাহা
- Born: 1941 (age 84–85)
- Education: University of Rajshahi; London School of Economics

Sanat Kumar Saha (born 1941) is a Bangladeshi educator, economist, and Tagore exponent. He was awarded Ekushey Padak in 2015 by the Government of Bangladesh. He served as a professor of economics at the University of Rajshahi. He is a former member of the board of directors of Bangladesh Bank.

== Education and career ==
Saha studied at the University of Rajshahi and London School of Economics. In 2006, he retired as a professor from the University of Rajshahi. He served as a director of Bangladesh Bank beginning in 2010.

== Awards ==
- Rabindra Award (2015)
- Ekushey Padak (2015)
- Bangla Academy Literary Award (2012)
- "8th Prothom Alo Borsho Shera Boi 1417" (2012)

== Works ==
- Kobita-Akobita Rabindranath
