= Selina Hossain =

Bangladeshi writer

- সেলিনা হোসেন
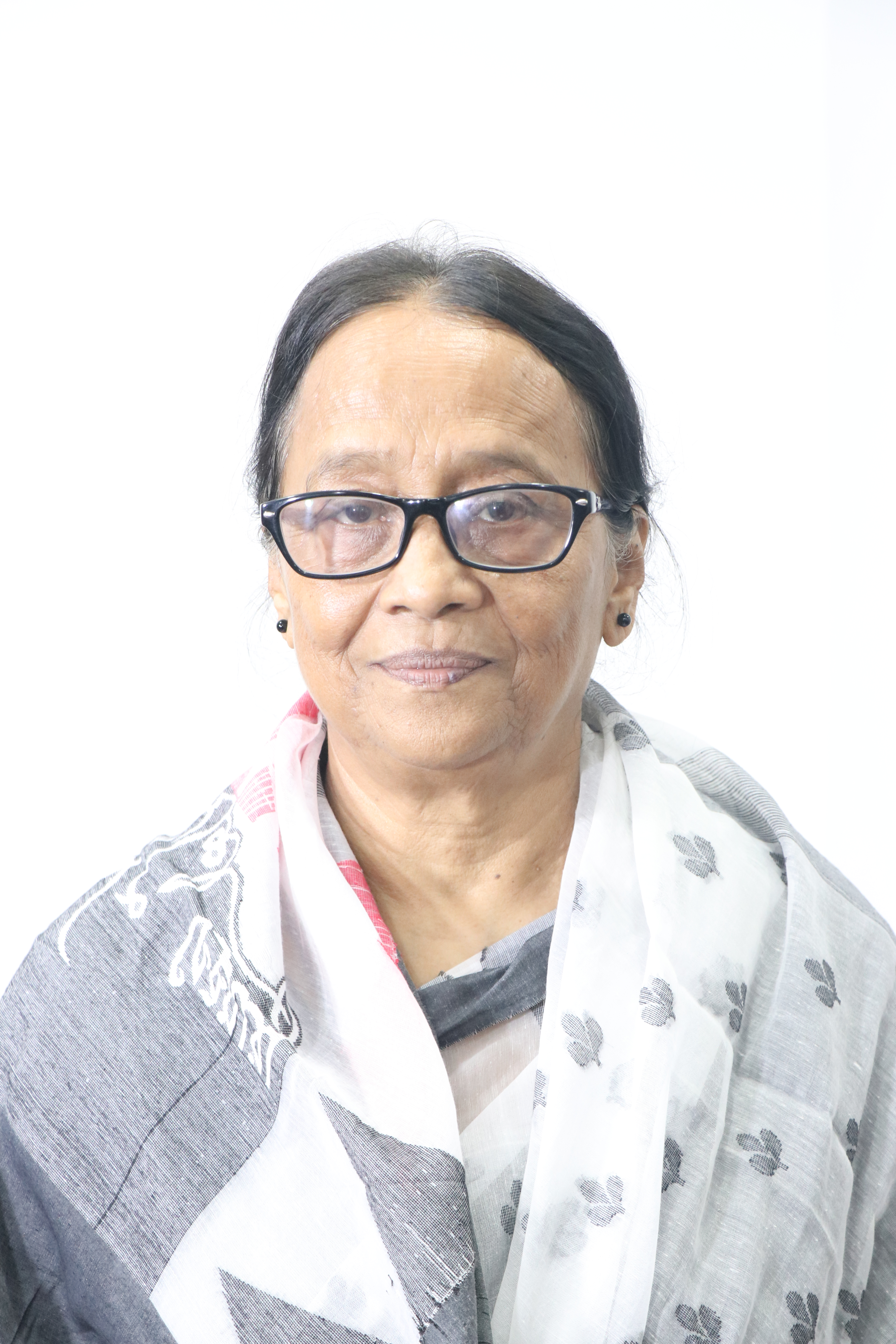
- Hossain in 2019

President of Bangla Academy
- In office 3 February 2022 – 17 October 2024
- Preceded by: Rafiqul Islam
- Succeeded by: Abul Kashem Fazlul Haq

Chairperson of Bangladesh Shishu Academy
- In office 23 April 2014 – 2018
- Preceded by: Sheikh Abdul Ahad
- Succeeded by: Lucky Enam

Personal details
- Born: 14 June 1947 (age 79) Rajshahi, Bengal Province, British India
- Education: Rajshahi University (MA)
- Occupation: Novelist, administrator
- Awards: full list

Selina Hossain (born 14 June 1947) is a Bangladeshi novelist. Her major works include Hangor Nodi Grenade (1976) and Poka Makorer Ghor Boshoti (1996). She earned all major national awards – Bangla Academy Literary Award in 1980, Ekushey Padak in 2009 and Independence Day Award in 2018. Her novels and short stories have been translated into English, Russian, French, Japanese, Korean, Finnish and Malay. She served as the chairperson of Bangladesh Shishu Academy from 2014 until 2018. Selina served as the president of the Bangla Academy from 3 February 2022 until her resignation on 17 October 2024.

== Early life and education ==
Hossain was born to A. K. Mosharrof Hossain and Mariamennesa Bakul. She earned MA degree in Bengali language and literature from Rajshahi University in 1968.

== Career ==
In 1994–95, Hossain won a scholarship from the Ford Foundation for her novel, Sandhya Gayatri.

Hossain retired as the director of the Bangla Academy. She served as a member of the National Human Rights Commission of Bangladesh and the representative of her government to the executive board of UNESCO. In 2014, she was appointed the Chairman of the Bangladesh Shishu Academy.

Hossain's novel Bhumi O Kusum was the first work in Bangla literature to address the enclave issue.

== Works ==
=== Novels ===
1. Josnay Shurjo Jala (1973)
2. Jolochchhas (1972)
3. Hangor Nodi Grenade (1976)
4. Magna Caitanye Shis (1979)
5. Japito Jibon (1981)
6. Podoshobdo (1982)
7. Neel Moyurer Joubon (1983)
8. Chand Bene (1984)
9. Poka Makorer Ghor Bosoti (1986)
10. Nirontor Ghontadhoni (1987)
11. Ksharan (1988)
12. Katatare Projapoti (1989)
13. Khun O Bhalobasha (1990)
14. Kalketu and Fullora (1992)
15. Bhalobasha Pritilota (1992)
16. Tanaporen (1994)
17. Gayetree Shondha (1996)
18. Dipannita (1997)
19. Joddha (1998)
20. Kaktarua (1999)
21. Lara (2000)
22. Kathkoylar Chhobi (2001)
23. Mohinir Biye (2002)
24. Anobic Andhar (2003)
25. Ghumkature Ishwar (2004)
26. Morger Neelpakhi (2005)
27. Opekkha (2007)
28. Deener Roshite Gittu (2007)
29. Mati O Shossher Bunon (2007)
30. Purno Chobir Mognota (2008)
31. Bhumi O Kushum (2010)
32. Jomuna Nodir Mushayra (2011)
33. Gachhtir Chhaya Nai (2012)
34. Shonali Dumur (2012)
35. August-er Ak Raat (2013)
36. Guerilla O Beerangona (2014)
37. Dinkaler Kathkhor (2015)

=== Stories ===
- Utso Theke Nirontor (1969)
- Jolobotee Megher Batash (1975)
- Khol Korotal (1982)
- Porojonmo (1986)
- Manushti (1993)
- Motijaner Meyera (1995)
- Onura Purnima (2008)
- Sokhinar Chondrakola (2008)
- Ekaler Pantaburi (2008)
- Obelar Dinkhon (2009)
- Narir Rupkotha (2009)
- Nunpantar Goragori (2014)
- Mrityur Nilpadma (2015)

== Awards ==
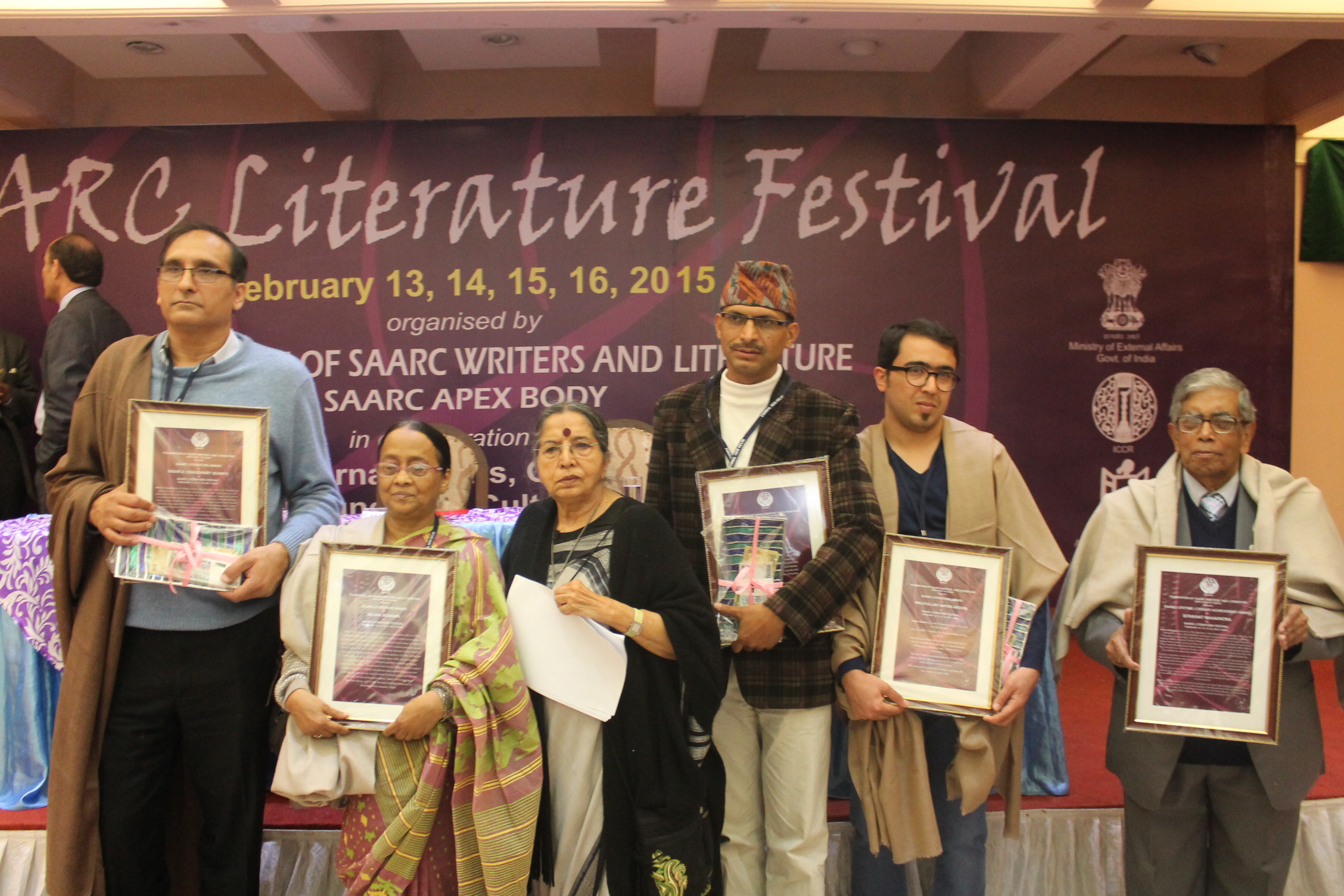
Selina Hossain with Sitakanta Mahapatra, Suman Pokhrel and other recipients of SAARC Literary Award - 2015

- Dr. Muhammad Enamul Huq Gold Medal (1969)
- Bangla Academy Literary Award (1980)
- Alaol Literary Award (1981)
- Kamar Mushtari Memorial Prize (1987)
- Philips Literary Prize (1994)
- Alakta Literary Award (1994)
- Premchand Fellowship of Sahitya Akademi
- Ekushey Padak (2009)
- Rabindra Smriti Puraskar by IIPM. New Delhi (2010)
- Chandrabati Academy Gold Medal (2010)
- International Award for Doctor of Literature (Honoris Causa) from the Rabindra Bharati University (2010)
- Surma Choudhury Memorial Award by IIPM New Delhi (2011)
- SAARC Literary Award (2015)
- Independence Day Award (2018)
