= Hayat Mamud =

- হায়াৎ মামুদ
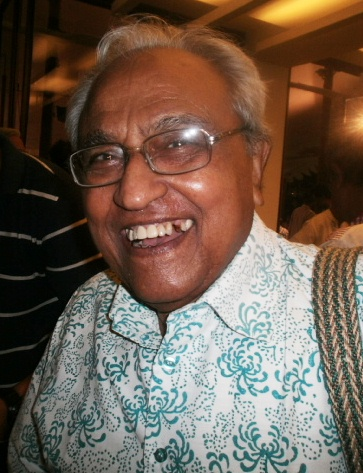
- Born: Moniruzzaman; 2 July 1939 (age 86); Maura, Hooghly district, Bengal Province
- Education: Ph.D. (literature)
- Alma mater: University of Dhaka; Jadavpur University

Moniruzzaman (known by his pen-name Hayat Mamud; born 2 July 1939) is a Bangladeshi essayist-poet. He was awarded Ekushey Padak in 2016 by the government of Bangladesh.

== Early life and family ==
Mamud was born on 2 July 1939 to a Bengali Muslim family in the village of Maura in the Hooghly district of the Bengal Province. He migrated with his parents, Muhammad Shamsher Ali and Aminah Khatun, to Dacca in East Bengal as a result of the 1950 anti-Muslim riots in West Bengal.

== Education ==
Mamud completed his bachelor's and master's degree in Bengali literature from University of Dhaka. He earned his Ph.D. degree on contemporary literature from Jadavpur University.

== Career ==
Mamud served as a faculty member of Jahangirnagar University.

== Awards ==
- Ekushey Padak (2016)
- Bangla Academy Literary Award for children's literature
