= Mahadev Saha =

Bangladeshi poet

- মহাদেব সাহা
- Born: 5 August 1944 (age 82); Dhanghara, Sirajganj District, Bengal Presidency, British India
- Occupation: Poet

Mahadev Saha (born 5 August 1944) is a Bangladeshi poet. He was awarded Ekushey Padak in 2001 and Independence Day Award in 2021 by the government of Bangladesh.

== Early life ==
Born in Dhanghara, Sirajganj, on 5 August 1944. His father is Gadadhar Saha. His mother is Birajmohini. He is the only child of his parents. He studied at Dhaka College, Bogra College and Rajshahi University. He started his professional career as a Research Fellow in Rajshahi University. His poetic urge began in his adolescent period. His wife is Nila Saha. They have two sons. Tirtha Saha and Saudha Saha. He also has a granddaughter, Ritocheta Saha.

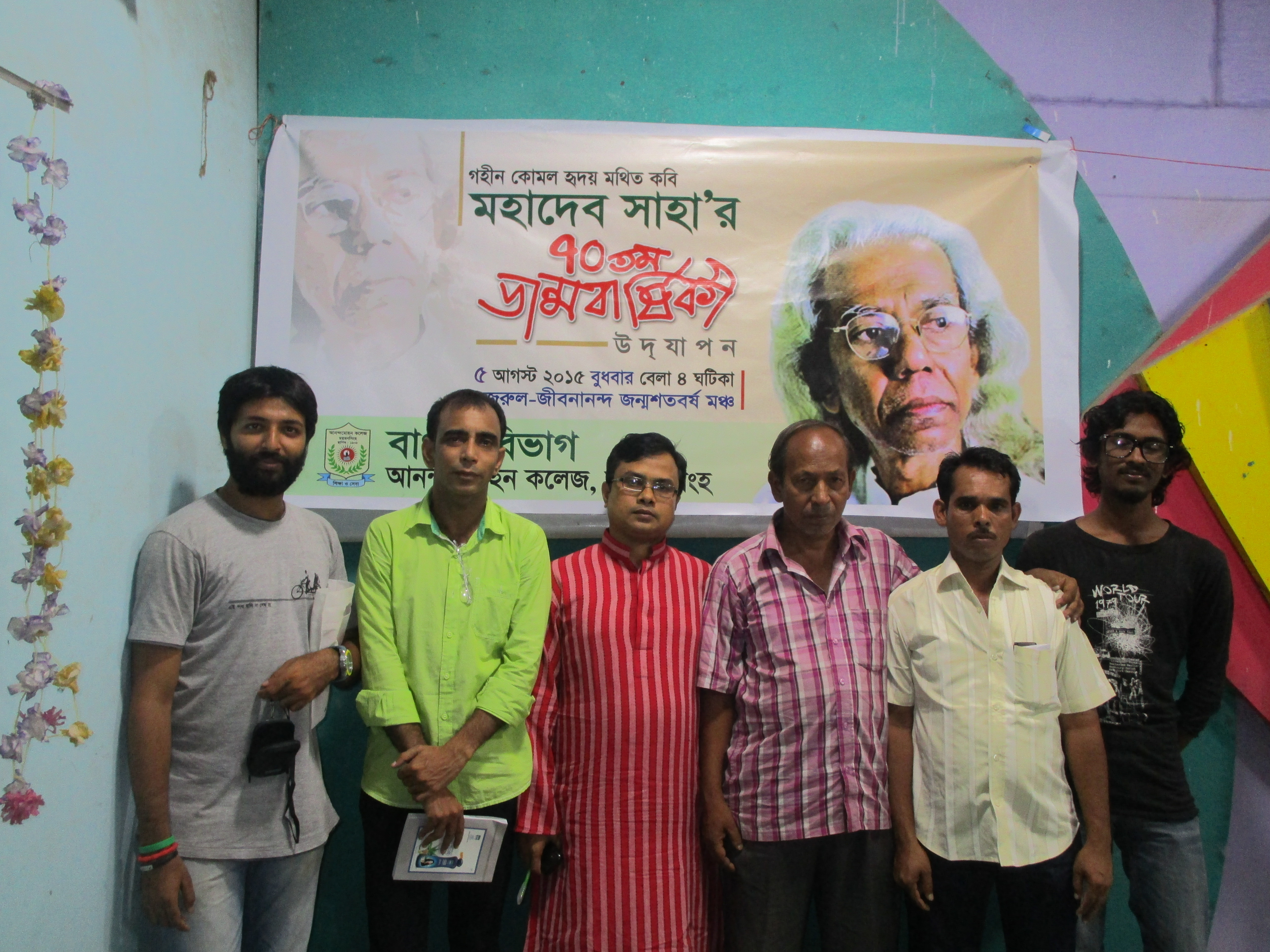
Mahadev Saha 70th birth anniversary

He owns 130 books. He writes columns in daily newspapers. Awards and Honours: The Bangla Academy Award, 1983; Mahbubullah-Jebunnesa Award, 1995; Bogra Lekhak Chakra Award, 1997; Ekushey Padak, 2001; Kabi Sukanta Sahitya Award, 2001; Khalekdad Chowdhury Smriti Award, 2002; Kolkata Bangabandhu Award, 2005; Kapotakkha Sahitya Award, 2007; Jatio Kabita Parishad Award, 2008; Dainik Destiny Honour, 2009; Mani Sing-Farhad Honour, 2009; Bangladesh Canada Association of Calgary Honour, 2010; Kabi Sangsad Award, 2010; Sadat Ali Akanda Award, 2010; Kabitalap Award, 2010; Sirajganj Rabindra Parishad Honour, 2010; Sanghati Gunijan Honour, London, 2011; Uttara University Honour, 2011; Bangla Utsab Gunijan Honour, New York, 2014; Amin Jewellers Gunijan Honour, 2016.

== Works ==
Saha has published 55 books of poetry, 3 books for children, 4 books of essays, 3 compilations of poems and one volume of selected poems.

- Ei Griha Ei Sannyas (1972)
- Chai Bish, Amorata (1975)

== Awards ==
- Independence Award (2021)
- Ekushey Padak (2001)
- Bangla Academy Literary Award (1983)
- Zebunnesa-Mahabubllah Award
- Alaol Shahitya Award
- Khalekdad Chowdhury Smriti Padak
- Saadat Ali Akhand Literature Award (2010)
