= Irreligion in Bangladesh =

Irreligion in Bangladesh is rare and uncommon. A Gallup survey conducted between 2014 and 2015 found that approximately less than 1% identified as convinced atheists in the poll. Bangladesh has 165.2 million people as of the 2022 census.

== Statistics ==
In Bangladesh’s national census and social surveys, categories such as 'irreligious' or 'atheist' are typically omitted. According to a 2014–2015 survey conducted by Gallup, less than 1% of the population identified as "convinced atheists."

== History ==
Established in Dhaka in 1926 under the leadership of thinkers such as Kazi Abdul Odud, Abul Hussain, Kazi Motahar Hossain, and Motaher Hussain Chowdhury, the 'Muslim Sahitya Samaj' (Muslim Literary Society) movement rallied behind the slogan: "Where knowledge is limited, the intellect is stifled, and liberation is impossible." In 1929, the publication of Abul Hussain’s essay Adesher Nigraha (The Oppression of Commands) provoked a furious reaction from Dhaka’s conservative Muslim society, forcing him to apologize and ultimately leave the city.

The philosopher Ali Matubbar (1900–1985) authored books such as Satyer Sondhan (The Search for Truth, 1973), Srishtirahasya (The Mystery of Creation, 1977), and Anuman (Hypothesis, 1983), in which he presented arguments against religious myths and superstitions in language accessible to the common people.

Following the political upheavals after 1975, "Bismillahir Rahmanir Rahim" was inserted into the constitution, and in 1988, Islam was enshrined as the "State Religion."

In 2001, the engineer and writer Avijit Roy launched 'Mukto-Mona', the first and largest online platform in South Asia uniting Bengali atheists and rationalists.

Between 2013 and 2018, militant groups such as Al-Qaeda in the Indian Subcontinent (AQIS) and Ansarullah Bangla Team (ABT) created hitlists and systematically assassinated bloggers, writers, publishers, and LGBT activists. These victims were hacked to death with machetes using the same modus operandi.

In November 2024, a decision to recruit 5,166 music and physical education teachers for primary schools was revoked following claims by Islamist groups that music education is "anti-Islamic."

== Legal framework ==
According to the Bangladeshi constitution, “The state religion of the Republic is Islam, but the State shall ensure equal status and equal rights in the practice of the Hindu, Buddhist, Christian, and other religions.” The constitution stipulates the state should not grant political status in favor of any religion and bans religiously based political parties. It provides for the right to profess, practice, or propagate all religions “subject to law, public order, and morality” and states religious communities or denominations have the right to establish, maintain, and manage their religious institutions. The constitution states no one attending any educational institution shall be required to receive instruction in, or participate in ceremonies or worship pertaining to, a religion to which he or she does not belong to.

Although Bangladesh does not possess a blasphemy law directly mandating the death penalty, Sections 295A and 298 of the Penal Code are regularly employed to file cases against atheist bloggers and writers. Islamist parties have long demanded that the punishment under these sections be elevated to the death penalty. Under Section 28 of the Digital Security Act (DSA) enacted in 2018, which criminalizes acts that hurt religious values, numerous journalists and bloggers have been arrested.

== State censorship ==
During the Ekushey Book Fairs of 2023 and 2024, the Bangla Academy refused to allocate a stall to the publishing house 'Adarsha,' claiming that three of its books were contrary to "religious sentiments." Although the publisher, Mahbub Rahman, sought legal recourse through the courts, he was ultimately unable to participate in the fair.

In 2022, Hriday Chandra Mondal, a schoolteacher in Munshiganj, faced allegations of "hurting religious sentiments" after a student recorded his classroom discussion on the distinction between science and religion and posted it on social media.

== Exile ==
Following an attack in 2015, Ahmedur Rashid Tutul, the publisher of Shuddhashar, sought asylum in Norway. From there, he continues to operate 'Shuddhashar' magazine online, which currently serves as a platform for international writers and human rights activists. Tutul was awarded the 'International Writer of Courage' award in 2016.

Similarly, the atheist activist Asad Noor lives in exile, regularly criticizing fundamentalism through video blogs. There are currently multiple cases filed and arrest warrants issued against him within the country.

== Persecution ==
Many secularist or irreligious bloggers who supported the anti-Islamist 2013 Shahbag protests came under attack following the protests. Amnesty International noted with concern the rise in communal violence against religious minorities, including attacks on Hindus.

In early April 2013 the police began arresting bloggers they said were hurting religious sentiments. Four bloggers, Subrata Adhikary Shuvo, Russell Parvez, Mashiur Rahman Biplob and Asif Mohiuddin (who was still recovering from his wounds), were arrested within days of one another. The blog, Amar Blog, was also taken down. A religious group called Hefazat-e-Islam Bangladesh called for the hanging of the bloggers. Asif Mohiuddin's blog was shut down by the Bangladesh Telecommunication Regulatory Commission, and he was jailed for posting "offensive comments about Islam and Mohammed." The secular government arrested several other bloggers and blocked about a dozen websites and blogs, as well as giving police protection to some bloggers.

International organisations, including Human Rights Watch, Amnesty International, Reporters without Borders and the Committee to Protect Journalists condemned the imprisonment of bloggers and the climate of fear for journalists. Worldwide protest and demonstrations were held on in 2013 to put pressure on the Bangladeshi government to free the arrested bloggers. Several humanist groups (including the IHEU, the Center for Inquiry, the British Humanist Association, American Atheists and the Secular Coalition for America) called for their release, among others including Salman Rushdie, Taslima Nasrin, Hemant Mehta, Maryam Namazie, PZ Myers, Avijit Roy, Abu Ahammad, Ajoy Roy, Qayyum Chowdhury, Ramendu Majumdar and Muhammad Zafar Iqbal.

Taslima Nasrin, an author and atheist, used to criticise rising religious fundamentalism and government inaction in her newspaper columns and books. In early 1992, mobs began attacking bookstores stocking her work. The same year she was assaulted at a book fair and her passport was confiscated. In July 1993, her novel Lajja was banned by the government which said it created misunderstanding among the communities. On 23 September 1993, a fatwa was issued for her death. After international pressure, her passport was returned in April 1994. She travelled to France and returned via India. On 4 July 1994, an arrest warrant was issued for hurting religious feelings and Nasrin went underground. On 3 August, she was granted bail, but she fled to Sweden and remained in exile. In 1998, she visited her critically ill mother in Bangladesh. In 2005, she moved to India and applied for citizenship.

In 2003, Bangladeshi author Humayun Azad wrote a book about an Islamic fundamentalist group Jamaat-ul-Mujahideen Bangladesh collaborating with the Pakistani army during the 1971 Bangladesh Liberation War. Azad received numerous death threats from fundamentalists until his death the next year. In May 2015, Humayun Azad's son, blogger Ananya Azad, was repeatedly threatened with death after publishing critiques of Islamist fundamentalism. He was subsequently forced into exile in Europe.

On 15 January 2013, Asif Mohiuddin, an atheist blogger (rational, gentle and Anti-Islamist), was stabbed near his office in Dhaka. He survived the attack. On 15 February 2013, Ahmed Rajib Haider, a prominent anti-Islamist blogger, was found murdered by a machete outside his Dhaka home. Mohiuddin, a winner of the BOBs award for online activism, was on an Islamist hit list that also included the murdered sociology professor Shafiul Islam.

On the night of 7 March 2013, an atheist blogger Sunnyur Rahaman was attacked by two men who swooped on him and hacked him with machetes while shouting "Allahu Akbar". He came under attack around 9:00 pm near Purabi Cinema Hall in Mirpur. With the support of local police he was rushed to Dhaka Medical College and Hospital with wounds in his head, neck, right leg and left hand.

On 26 February 2015, Avijit Roy, the founder of the Mukto-Mona blog, and his wife were attacked in Dhaka with machete-wielding assailants. Roy died on his way to the hospital. His wife was also seriously injured and lost a finger.

On 30 March 2015, blogger Washiqur Rahman was killed in a similar attack in Dhaka. The police arrested two suspects near the scene and recovered meat cleavers from them. The suspects said they killed Rahman due to his anti-Islamic articles.

On 12 March 2015, another blogger Ananta Bijoy Das was attacked and murdered by masked men wielding machetes. Ananta Bijoy Das was the editor of the science magazine Jukti.

== List of prominent irreligious Bangladeshis ==
- Humayun Azad
- Aroj Ali Matubbar
- Ananta Bijoy Das
- Daud Haider
- Taslima Nasrin
- Avijit Roy
- Ahmed Sharif
- Asif Mohiuddin
- Asad Noor
- Bonya Ahmed
- Tasneem Khalil
- Ahmed Rajib Haider
- Mahmudul Haque Munshi

== See also ==
- Persecution of atheists
- Irreligion by country
- Religion in Bangladesh
- 2013 Bengali blog blackout
- Political repression of cyber-dissidents
- List of journalists killed in Bangladesh
- Nazimudden Samad
