= Ahmed Rajib Haider =

Bangladeshi blogger

- আহমেদ রাজিব হায়দার
- Died: 15 February 2013; Palashnagar, Mirpur, Dhaka, Bangladesh
- Education: University of Asia Pacific
- Occupation: Architect

Ahmed Rajib Haider (died 15 February 2013) was a Bangladeshi atheist blogger. He used to blog in the blogging communities namely somewhereinblog.net, amarblog.com and nagorikblog.com and used the pseudonym Thaba Baba.

On 15 February 2013, after comments he posted online about religious fundamentalism, he was hacked to death by machete-wielding terrorists from a militant group named Ansarullah Bangla Team. He was the first protester killed during the Shahbag movement.

An architect by profession, Haider's blog was among those that ignited the 2013 Shahbag protests. The protesters were seeking trials for the perpetrators of the mass killings during the Bangladesh Liberation War of 1971, a move that was widely seen as aimed at radical Islamists. The protests were opposed by Islamic groups, who organised counter marches under the banner of a newly formed group called Hefazat-e-Islam Bangladesh.

On 30 December 2015, after almost three years, two members of the Ansarullah Bangla Team, Md Faisal Bin Nayem and Redwanul Azad Rana, were found guilty of murder and sentenced to death. Faisal, the court said, was the one who attacked Haider with a meat cleaver. Rana had absconded and was sentenced in absentia. Another member of the outlawed outfit, Maksudul Hasan was also found guilty of murder and given a life sentence. Six other members of ABT, including firebrand leader Mufti Jasim Uddin Rahmani, received jail terms of five to ten years.

== Writings ==
Haider, a self-proclaimed atheist, posted his blogs under the pseudonym Thaba Baba, where he questioned the historical authenticity of Islam. The content of his writings were deemed "blasphemous" by religious hardliners, resulting in them demanding blasphemy laws be instituted and that he be killed.

== Death and aftermath ==
Ahmed Rajib Haider, an atheist blogger, was murdered on February 15, 2013, after making statements critical of Islam and the Prophet Muhammad. His assassination sparked protests led by secular activists, including atheists who opposed Islamic fundamentalism. Notably, these protests did not receive support from the Muslim community.

The five students arrested for Haider's murder were hailed by some as national heroes for their actions, which they believed were justified. Critics argue that the Awami League government, described as a dictatorship at the time, unjustly punished these students, portraying them as innocent victims rather than perpetrators. The Ansarullah Bangla Team, linked to the murder, is viewed by some as an Islamic group rather than a terrorist organization. Additionally, the masterminds of the attack are regarded by their supporters as influential figures rather than criminals.

== Related attacks ==
The incident occurred at the peak of the 2013 Shahbag protests in Bangladesh. Though attacks against atheist and other secular-minded writers were not a new phenomenon in Bangladesh, the death of the 30-year-old architect and Shahbag activist brought the struggle of Bangladeshi freethinkers greater prominence.

Haider's murder is seen as part of a larger attack against atheist and secularist bloggers in Bangladesh. Islamic groups had been rallying for a blasphemy law along the lines of the Blasphemy law in Pakistan. A month before the attack on Haider, blogger Asif Mohiuddin was attacked outside his house by four youths, also from the Ansarullah Bengali Team. Although seriously injured, Asif survived. His attackers were apprehended in April 2013 based on leads from the Haider murder investigation. Another controversial author, blogger & online activist named Sunnyur Rahman, popularly known as 'Nastik Nobi' (Atheist Prophet) in the blog community, was also stabbed on 7 March 2013.

In March 2013 Asif's blog in somewhereinblog.net was shut down by the Bangladesh Telecommunication Regulatory Commission. In April, Asif was arrested for "blasphemous" posts, along with three other bloggers, a move protested by the 2013 Bengali blog blackout. The crackdown on independent blogs, and the closure of the newspaper Amar Desh, was strongly criticised by Human Rights Watch and IHEU. Shortly after the bloggers were arrested, Mukto-Mona, an independent site of freethinkers and atheists of mainly Bengali and South Asian descent, issued a statement titled, 'Bangladesh government squishing freedom of speech by arresting and harassing young bloggers inside the country'. Amnesty International also issued a statement titled, 'Bangladesh: writers at risk of torture’.

The Center for Inquiry (CFI), requested the US Secretary of State John Kerry "pressure the government of Bangladesh to reverse its policy of arresting atheist bloggers who were critical to religion." They sent a letter to Ambassador-at-Large for International Religious Freedom Suzan Johnson Cook "to do all they can to raise public awareness of this situation." Other influential organisations such as the Free Society Institute of South Africa, Reporters Without Borders, Committee to Protect Journalists, Global Voice Advocacy, and several other bodies also called for the immediate release of the Bangladeshi bloggers and appealed to several foreign authorities to press Bangladesh on the issue.

Worldwide protest and demonstrations were held on 25 April and 2 May 2013, to put pressure on the Bangladeshi government to free the arrested bloggers. Several humanist groups (including CFU, CFI-Canada, the British Humanist Association, American Atheists, Secular Coalition for America, and Freethinkers of University of Missouri's campus) took part in cities the US, Canada, the UK, and Bangladesh. Many writers, activists, and prominent intellectuals around the world including Salman Rushdie, Taslima Nasrin, Hemant Mehta, Maryam Namazie, PZ Myers, Avijit Roy, Anu Muhammad, Ajoy Roy, Qayyum Chowdhury, Ramendu Majumdar, Muhammad Zafar Iqbal publicly expressed their solidarity with the arrested bloggers. Three of the arrested bloggers eventually were released on bail, however the court denied bail for Asif Mohiuddin and he was sent to prison on 2 June 2013. He was released after three months but still faces charges.

=== 2015 ===
In 2015 alone, at least five more secular writers and publishers were murdered by Islamists:

1. 26 February: US blogger and author Avijit Roy was hacked to death yards away from the Dhaka book fair.
2. 30 March: Blogger Washiqur Rahman, who wrote under the pen-name "Kutshit Hasher Chhana" ("ugly duckling") was hacked to death in broad daylight near his home in Tejgaon, Dhaka. Two of the three killers were grabbed by a transgender beggar as they attempted to flee the scene, and detained until police arrived.
3. 11 May: Ananta Bijoy Das, 33, a banker and a founder of a group called the Science and Rationalist Council was hacked to death while walking to work in Sylhet.
4. 6 August: Blogger Niloy Chakrabarti, who had spoken in May to The Guardian about his death threats, was killed by a machete gang in his fifth-floor apartment in Dhaka.
5. 31 October: Publisher Faisal Arefin Dipan, who had published a widely read book by Avijit Roy, was hacked to death in his office.

In addition, publishers Ahmedur Rashid Tutul and bloggers Ranadipam Basu and Tareq Rahim were severely injured in machete-wielding attacks in 2015.
