= Attacks by Islamic extremists in Bangladesh =

Violence in Bangladesh, 2013-2016

2013-2016 Jihadist attacks in Bangladesh
- Part of 2013 Bangladesh violence
- Location: Bangladesh, mainly in Dhaka
- Date: 2013-2016
- Target: Leftists; Atheists; Secularists; Liberals
- Attack type: Stabbing; Mob lynching Mass shooting Stone pelting Bombing
- Weapons: Poisoned knives Knives; Explosives
- Deaths: 54
- Injuries: 500+
- Perpetrator: Al-Qaeda in the Indian Subcontinent: Ansar al-Islam; Jama'atul Mujahideen Islamic State - Bengal Province
- Motive: Retaliation to Shapla square massacre Revenge; Anti-Communism; Anti-secularism; Jihadism; Homophobia; Anti-Ahmediyya sentiment Hinduphobia

Attacks by Islamist extremists in Bangladesh took place during a period of turbulence in Bangladesh between 2013 and 2016 when a number of secularist and atheist writers, bloggers, and publishers in Bangladesh; foreigners; homosexuals; and religious minorities such as Hindus, Buddhists, Christians and Ahmadis who were seen as having offended Islam and Muhammad were attacked in retaliation, with many killed by Muslim extremists.

By 2 July 2016, a total of 48 people, including 20 foreign nationals, had been killed in such attacks. These attacks were largely blamed on extremist groups such as Ansarullah Bangla Team and Islamic State of Iraq and Syria. The Bangladeshi government was criticized for its response to the attacks, which included charging and jailing some of the secularist bloggers for allegedly defaming some religious groups; or hurting the religious sentiments of different religious groups; or urging the bloggers to flee overseas. This strategy was seen by some as pandering to hard line elements within Bangladesh's Muslim majority population. About 89% of the population in Bangladesh is Sunni Muslim. The government's eventual crackdown in June 2016 was also criticized for its heavy-handedness, as more than 11,000 people were arrested in a little more than a week (as of 18 June 2016).

== Background ==
In 2010 the government of Bangladesh, headed by the secularist Awami League, established a war crimes tribunal to investigate war crimes perpetrated during Bangladesh's bloody 1971 War of Independence from Pakistan. In February 2013 Abdul Quader Molla, a leader of the Bangladesh Jamaat-e-Islami party (a Islamist party within the opposition coalition), was sentenced to life imprisonment by the tribunal. The perceived mildness of the sentence was condemned by Bangladesh's secularist bloggers and writers, who helped organize the 2013 Shahbag protests in response, calling for the death penalty for Molla. The protestors quickly expanded their demands to include outlawing the Jamaat-e-Islami party itself for its role in the 1971 war.

Shortly after the first Shahbag protests, counter-demonstrations, which quickly degenerated into violence, were organized by Islamist groups. Islamist leaders denounced the war crimes tribunal as political and called for an end to the prosecution of Jamaat-e-Islami leaders; they demanded instead the death penalty for secularist bloggers, denouncing them as "atheists" and accusing them of blasphemy. A spokesman for the secularist bloggers, Imran Sarker, stated that the hostility directed toward them by Islamists is due primarily to the bloggers' growing political influence in Bangladesh, which represents a major obstacle to the Islamist goal of a religious state.

Though there were occasional attacks on secularists prior to the 2013 Shahbag protests, the frequency of attacks has increased since. Reporters Without Borders noted that in 2014 a group calling itself "Defenders of Islam" published a "hit list" of 84 Bangladeshis, mostly secularists, of whom nine have already reportedly been killed and others attacked. Responsibility for many of the attacks has been claimed by Ansarullah Bangla Team, a group that, according to police, has links with both the youth wing of Jamaat-e-Islami and al-Qaeda. The group has since been banned by the government. Other attacks appear to have been perpetrated by more obscure groups. Among some extremists, this violence is motivated by inceldom.

== Government and international response ==
While police have arrested a number of suspects in the killings, and some bloggers have received police protection, the Bangladesh government has also responded by arresting and jailing a number of secularist bloggers for "defaming Islam" and by shutting down several websites. According to Sarker, "[T]he government has taken this easy route to appease a handful of mullahs whose support they need to win the upcoming election."

A number of non-governmental organisations (NGOs), including Human Rights Watch, Amnesty International, Reporters without Borders, PEN International, PEN Canada and the Committee to Protect Journalists have criticized the government for failing to protect its citizens and for not condemning the attacks, and have condemned the imprisonment of bloggers as an attack on free speech, which they say is contributing to a climate of fear for Bangladeshi journalists.

In a petition published in The Guardian on 22 May 2015, 150 authors, including Salman Rushdie, Margaret Atwood, and Yann Martell, called on the government of Bangladesh to put an end to the deadly attacks on bloggers, urging the prime minister and government "to do all in their power to ensure that the tragic events of the last three months are not repeated, and to bring the perpetrators to justice."

On 7 June 2016 Bangladeshi Minister of Home Affairs Asaduzzaman Khan alleged that the main opposition party BNP has links to the attacks, and that these attacks are part of a wider conspiracy that also involved Mossad, the national intelligence agency of Israel. An Israeli Foreign Ministry spokesman in Jerusalem later rejected the allegation in a statement and termed the accusation of the Bangladeshi Home Minister as "utter drivel".

The United Nations High Commissioner for Human Rights, Zeid Ra'ad Al Hussein, expressed concern on behalf of the United Nations on 13 June 2016 by saying, "I am very concerned about the dramatic increase in number [sic] of brutal murders in Bangladesh that target freethinkers, liberals, religious minorities and LGBT activists."

On 14 June 2016 approximately 100,000 Bangladeshi Muslim clerics released a fatwa, ruling that the murder of "non-Muslims, minorities and secular activists...forbidden in Islam".

== Attacks on atheist bloggers and writers ==
=== Asif Mohiuddin ===
On 15 January 2013 Asif Mohiuddin, a self-described "militant atheist" blogger, was stabbed near his office in Motijheel, Dhaka. He survived the attack. Mohiuddin, a winner of the BOBs award for online activism, was on an Islamist hit list that also included the sociology professor Shafiul Islam. The Islamist fundamentalist group Ansarullah Bangla Team claimed responsibility for the attack. According to Mohiuddin, he later met his attackers in jail, and they told him, "You left Islam, you are not a Muslim, you criticized the Quran, we had to do this." Reporters Without Borders stated that Mohiuddin and others have "clearly" been targeted for their "opposition to religious extremism".

=== Ahmed Rajib Haider ===
On the night of 15 February 2013, Ahmed Rajib Haider, an atheist blogger, was attacked while leaving his house in the Area Palashnagar of Mirpur neighborhood of Dhaka. His body was found lying in a pool of blood, mutilated to the point that his friends could not recognise him. The following day, his coffin was carried through Shahbagh Square in a public protest attended by more than 100,000 people.

Haider was an organizer of the Shahbag movement, a group "which seeks death for war criminals and a ban on Jamaat-e-Islami and its student front Islami Chhatra Shibir." According to Haider's family, Haider was murdered "for the blogs he used to write to bring 'war criminals' to justice" and for his outspoken criticism of the Jamaat-e-Islami party. The Shahbag movement described Haider as their "first martyr".

=== Sunnyur Rahaman ===
On the night of 7 March 2013 Sunnyur Rahaman was injured when two men swooped in on him and hacked him with machetes. He came under attack around 9:00 p.m. near the Purabi Cinema Hall in Mirpur, Dhaka. With the assistance of local police, he was rushed to Dhaka Medical College and Hospital with wounds to his head, neck, right leg, and left hand. Rahaman was a Shahbag movement activist and a critic of various religious parties, including Jamaat-e-Islami.

=== Ashik Mahmud Chowdhury & Shahaduj Jaman Shanto ===
On 31 October 2019 Ashik Mahmud Chowdhury and Shahaduj Jaman Santo were attacked by a group of extremists. They fell under attack around 11:30 PM in the area of Farmgate, Dhaka. After the attack both of them were taken to Dhaka Medical College and Hospital. Chowdhury was declared dead and the Santo was severely injured.

=== Shafiul Islam ===
On 15 November 2014 a teacher in the Rajshahi University sociology department named Shafiul Islam, a follower of the Baul community, was struck with sharp weapons by several youths on his way home in Rajshahi city. He died after being taken to Rajshahi Medical College and Hospital. A fundamentalist Islamist militant group named 'Ansar al Islam Bangladesh' claimed responsibility for the attack. On a social media website, the group declared: "Our Mujahideens [fighters] executed a 'Murtad' [apostate] today in Rajshahi who had prohibited female students in his department to wear 'Burka' [veil]." The website also quoted a 2010 article from a newspaper affiliated with Jamaat-e-Islami stating that "Professor Shafiul Islam, while being the chair of the sociology department, recruited teachers on condition of being clean-shaved and not wearing kurta-pajamas. He barred female students from wearing burka in classes. This led to many students abandoning burka against their will."

According to one of Shafiul Islam's colleagues, the victim was not anti-Islam but had prohibited female students from wearing full-face veils in his classes as he believed they could be used to cheat in exams.

=== Avijit Roy ===
Bonya Ahmed speaking about the attack (18:54), and putting it in a broader context.

On 26 February 2015 bio-engineer Dr. Avijit Roy, a well-known Bangladeshi blogger, and his wife Bonya Ahmed were attacked in Dhaka by machete-wielding assailants. Roy and his wife had been returning home from the Ekushey Book Fair by bicycle rickshaw when around 8:30 p.m. they were attacked near the Teacher Student Center intersection of Dhaka University by unidentified assailants. According to witnesses, two assailants stopped and dragged them from the rickshaw to the pavement before striking them with machetes. Roy was struck and stabbed in the head with sharp weapons. His wife was slashed on her shoulders and the fingers of her left hand severed when she attempted to go to her husband's aid. Both were rushed to Dhaka Medical College Hospital, where Roy died at 10:30 p.m. His wife survived the attack.

Roy was a naturalized U.S. citizen and founder of the influential Bangladeshi blog Mukto-Mona ("Freethinkers"). A champion of liberal secularism and humanism, Roy was an outspoken atheist and opponent of religious extremism. He was the author of ten books, the best known of which was a critique of religious extremism, Virus of Faith. A group calling itself Ansar Bangla 7 claimed responsibility for the attack, describing Roy's writings as a "crime against Islam". They also stated that he was targeted as a U.S. citizen in retaliation for U.S. bombing of ISIS militants in Syria.

Roy's killing sparked protests in Dhaka and brought forth expressions of concern internationally. UNESCO Director-General Irina Bokova called for the perpetrators to be brought to justice, and for the government to defend freedom of expression and public debate. Author Tahmima Anam wrote in The New York Times: "Blogging has become a dangerous profession in Bangladesh", stating that writers have rallied at Dhaka University to criticise the authorities for "not doing enough to safeguard freedom of expression". Anam wrote

[Avijit Roy] and Mr. Rahman were the victims of murderous thugs, but they were also the victims of a poisonous political climate, in which secularists and Islamists, observant Muslims and atheists, Jamaat-e-Islami and the Awami League are pitted against one another. They battle for votes, for power, for the ideological upper hand. There seems to be no common ground.

Mahfuz Anam, editor of The Daily Star, wrote that the death "is a spine-chilling warning to us all that we all can be targets. All that needs to happen for any of us to be killed is that some fanatic somewhere in the country, decides that someone or anyone, needs to be killed." Anam stated:

We believe that diversity, tolerance and freedom of conscience – fundamental to our existence – are being challenged here... What is being destroyed is an integral part of the values of our freedom struggle and the democratic struggle that we have waged so far.

=== Washiqur Rahman ===
On 30 March 2015 another blogger, Washiqur Rahman, was killed in the Tejgaon neighborhood of Dhaka in an attack similar to that perpetrated on Avijit Roy. The police arrested two suspects near the scene and recovered meat cleavers from them. The suspects said they killed Raman because of his anti-Islamic articles. Raman was reportedly known for criticizing "irrational religious beliefs". The suspects informed the police that they are also members of the Ansarullah Bangla Team and had trained for fifteen days before killing the blogger.

Imran Sarker told reporters that, unlike Roy, Raman was not a high-profile blogger, but "was targeted because open-minded and progressive bloggers are being targeted in general. They are killing those who are easy to access, when they get the opportunity... The main attempt is to create fear among bloggers." According to Sarker, Raman's murder was part of a "struggle between those who are promoting political Islam to turn Bangladesh into a fundamentalist, religious state and the secular political forces ... That is why [the bloggers] have become the main target, and the political parties who are supposed to prevent such attacks and provide security to them seem unable to do so. The main problem is that even mainstream political parties prefer to compromise with these radical groups to remain in power".

The Committee to Protect Journalists issued a press release stating that Raman's death occurred in a climate of "official harassment of journalists in Bangladesh".

=== Ananta Bijoy Das ===
Ananta Bijoy Das, an atheist blogger who was on an extremist hit-list for his writing, was hacked to death by four masked men in Sylhet on 12 May 2015. Ananta wrote blogs for Mukto-Mona. He had authored three books on science, evolution, and revolution in the Soviet Union, and headed the Sylhet-based science and rationalist council. He was also an editor of a quarterly magazine called Jukti (Logic).

Ananta Das was invited by the Swedish PEN to discuss the persecution of writers in Bangladesh, but the Swedish government refused him a visa on the grounds that he might not return to Bangladesh after his visit.

Lawyer Sara Hossain said of Roy and Das, "They've always believed and written very vocally in support of free expression and they've very explicitly written about not following any religion themselves." Asia director of Human Rights Watch Brad Adams said of Ananta's killing, "This pattern of vicious attacks on secular and atheist writers not only silences the victims but also sends a chilling message to all in Bangladesh who espouse independent views on religious issues."

An editorial in The Guardian stated: "Like Raif Badawi, imprisoned and flogged in Saudi Arabia, the brave men who have been murdered are guilty of nothing more than honesty and integrity. Those are virtues that fundamentalists and fanatics cannot stand." The editorial concluded, "Violent jihadis have circulated a list with more than 80 names of free thinkers whom they wish to kill. The public murder of awkward intellectuals is one definition of barbarism. Governments of the west, and that of Bangladesh, must do much more to defend freedom and to protect lives."

=== Niloy Chatterjee ===
Niloy Chatterjee, also known as Niloy Chakroborty and by his pen name Niloy Neel, was killed on 7 August 2015. It is reported that a gang of about six men armed with machetes attacked him at his home in the Goran neighborhood of Dhaka and hacked him to death. Police said that the men had tricked his wife into allowing them into their home before killing him. His best friend Sahedul Sahed said that Neel had previously reported to the police that he feared for his life, but no action had been taken. He was an organiser of the Science and Rationalist Association Bangladesh, and had obtained a master's degree in Philosophy from Dhaka University in 2013. Niloy had written in Mukto-Mona, a blogging platform for secularists and freethinkers, was associated with the Shahbag Movement; he and his friend Sahedul Sahed had attended the public protest demanding justice for the murdered bloggers, Ananta Bijoy Das and Avijit Roy. Ansarullah Al Islam Bangladesh, an Al Qaeda group, claimed responsibility for Niloy's killing.

The UN urged a quick and fair investigation of the murder saying, "It is vital to ensure the identification of those responsible for this and the previous horrendous crimes, as well as those who may have masterminded the attacks." Amnesty International condemned the killing and said that it was the "urgent duty (of the government) to make clear that no more attacks like this will be tolerated". Other entities condemning the killing include the German government, Bangladesh Jamaat-e-Islami, Bangladeshi Prime Minister Sheikh Hasina, Human Rights Watch, the Communist Party of Bangladesh, Gonojagoron Moncho, and other political parties of Bangladesh, both rightist and leftist.

Writer Taslima Nasrin criticized the prime minister, Sheikh Hasina, and her government saying, "Sheikh Hasina's government is morally culpable. I am squarely blaming the state for these massacres in installment. Its indifference and so-called inability to rein in the murderous Ansarullah brigade is solely predicated on the fear of being labelled atheists."

=== Faisal Arefin Dipan ===
Faisal Arefin Dipan

Faisal Arefin Dipan, aged 43, the publisher of Jagriti Prakashany, which published Avijit Roy's Biswasher Virus (Bengali for The Virus of Faith), was hacked to death in Dhaka on 31 October 2015 at the hands of suspected religious extremists for his association with Avijit Roy and other freethinking, secular and atheist writers. Reports stated that he had been killed in his third-floor office at the Jagriti Prokashoni publishing house. The attack followed another stabbing, earlier the same day, in which publisher Ahmedur Rashid Chowdhury and two writers, Ranadeep Basu and Tareque Rahim, were stabbed in their office at another publishing house. The three men were taken to hospital, and at least one was reported to be in critical condition.

Faisal Arefin Dipan (Bengali: ফয়সল আরেফিন দীপন; 12 July 1972 – 31 October 2015) was born in an academic family. Both his father Abul Qasem Fazlul Huq, a scholar and a professor of Bengali literature, and mother Farida Pradhan, principal house tutor of Rokeya Hall, retired from Dhaka University. Dipan passed his Secondary School Certificate (1989) and Higher Secondary Certificate (1991) examinations from Udayan Bidyalaya (inside Dhaka University campus area) and Dhaka College respectively. Dipan obtained his BA (Hons) and MA in economics from Dhaka University during mid-late 90s.

Dipan started his publishing house, Jagriti Prokashony (জাগৃতি প্রকাশনী), at a small scale during his undergraduate days in 1992. As stated in a commemorative article in The Daily Star on 22 November 2015, "Growing up in a house full of books, Faisal Arefin Dipan had a lifelong fascination for books. He believed that books could rejuvenate a society, a state and a nation."

In the first year of its full commercial operations, Jagriti had managed to bring out twelve publications including Nilima Ibrahim's critically acclaimed work, Ami Birangona Bolchhi (আমি বীরাঙ্গনা বলছি) (As a War Heroine, I Speak in English) that tells the stories of Bengali women and girls who were raped and tortured by Pakistani soldiers and their collaborators during the Bangladesh Liberation War in 1971. The book documents the horrific experience of survival of these women and girls in Pakistani military camps and takes a critical look at the social structure that they struggled to rejoin after the war was over.

In the twenty-three years of operation of Jagriti, Dipan had published around sixteen hundred books and collaborated with many famous and upcoming writers of Bangladesh like Sufia Kamal, Nirmalindu Goon, Rudra Mohammad Shahidullah, Badruddin Umar, Selina Hossain, Selim Al Deen and Muhammed Zafar Iqbal to name a few.

==== Jagriti Prokashoni ====
Besides working with the prominent authorities and scholars of Bengali literature, Jagriti created a platform for many new and promising poets and writers. The genres of Jagriti publications cover a wide spectrum, such as, children's books, humour, fantasy, biography, science, history, science fiction, novels, poetry and scholarly essays.

In one of his television interviews in 2012, Dipan had expressed his aim to stand apart from many others by supporting both "creative entertainment" and "enrichment of mind" streams of works. He felt that the latter category was becoming subdued in the recent days and more needed to be done to revive the intellectual stream in Bangladeshi publications.

Jagriti's most notable publications include:

- Ibrahim, Nilima (1995). Ami Birangona Bolchhi আমি বীরাঙ্গনা বলছি [As a War Heroine, I Speak] (in Bengali). Jagriti Prokashony. ISBN 9844582873.
- Kamal, Sufia (2007). Ekattorer Dayeri একাত্তরের ডায়েরী [Diary of '71] (in Bengali). Jagriti Prokashony.
- Iqbal, Muhammed Zafar (2010). Aro Ekti Bijoy Chai আরো একটি বিজয় চাই (in Bengali). Jagriti Prokashony.
- Raihan, Abir; Roy, Avijit (2011). Obisshahser Dorshon অবিশ্বাসের দর্শন [The Philosophy of Disbelief] (in Bengali). Jagriti Prokashony. ISBN 978-984-8972-02-1.
- Roy, Avijit (2014). Bisshash Er Virus: Bisshash Er Bibortinio Bishleshon বিশ্বাসের ভাইরাস: বিশ্বাসের বিবর্তনীয় বিশ্লেষণ [The Virus of Faith] (in Bengali). Jagriti Prokashony. ISBN 9789849091455.
- Haque, Syed Shamsul. Premer Golpo প্রেমের-গল্প [Love Story] (in Bengali). Jagriti Prokashony.
- Goon, Nirmelindu; Shahidullah, Rudra Mohammad; Qadri, Shahid. Premer Kobita প্রেমের-কবিতা [Poems of Love] (in Bengali). Jagriti Prokashony.
- Umar, Badruddin. Durniti O Sontrash দুর্নীতি ও সন্ত্রাস [Corruption and Terrorism] (in Bengali). Jagriti Prokashony.
- Hossain, Selina. Chadbene চাঁদবেনে (in Bengali). Jagriti Prokashony.
- Sharif, Ahmed. Bhab-Budbud ভাব বুদ্বুদ (in Bengali). Jagriti Prokashony.
- Choudhury, Sirajul Islam (2009). Birup Bisshe Sahoshi Manush বিরূপ বিশ্বে সাহসী মানুষ (in Bengali). Jagriti Prokashony.
- Huq, Abul Qasem Fazlul (2004). Ekushe February Andolon একুশে ফেব্রুয়ারী আন্দোলন (in Bengali). Jagriti Prokashony.
- Osman, Bulbon (2010). Shilpo, Shilpi O Shomaj শিল্প শিল্পী ও সমাজ (in Bengali). Jagriti Prokashony.
- Kamal, Sultana. Chhilem Kothai Jeno Nilimar Niche ছিলেম কোথায় যেন নীলিমার নিচে (in Bengali). Jagriti Prokashony.
- Wadud, Kazi Abdul (2010). Hazarat Mohammad O Islam হযরত মুহাম্মদ ও ইসলাম (in Bengali). Jagriti Prokashony.
- Al Deen, Selim (2008). Dhaboman ধাবমান (in Bengali). Jagriti Prokashony.
- Rahman, Muhammad Habibur (2007). Jati Dhormo Borno Nirbisheshe Sobar Jonno Manobadhikar জাতি ধর্ম বর্ণ সবার জন্য মানবাধিকার (in Bengali). Jagriti Prokashony.
- আহসান, আলী (2015). Odvut Chobigulo অদ্ভুত ছবিগুলো (in Bengali). Jagriti Prokashony.

Dipan was an active member in the publishers' associations in Bangladesh and had held several positions in the executive committees. He was actively involved in the annual Ekushey Book Fair (একুশে বই মেলা) and other Bengali book fairs. Dipan had appeared in newspaper and television interviews, and talk shows to discuss publication industry in Bangladesh.

Despite the tragic death of Dipan, Jagriti Prokashony remains fully operational today under the management of Dipan's spouse Razia Rahman Jolly (a Senior Medical Officer at the Dhaka University Medical Centre).

==== Association with Avijit Roy ====
Avijit Roy, the slain Bangladeshi-American online activist, writer and blogger, was known to Dipan from his early childhood in the Dhaka University campus area where they lived in the same neighbourhood and attended Udayan Bidyalaya.

Avijit had two of his significant works, Philosophy of Disbelief (অবিশ্বাসের দর্শন) and Virus of Faith (বিশ্বাসের ভাইরাস: বিশ্বাসের বিবর্তনীয় বিশ্লেষণ), published from Jagriti Prokashony.

Dipan had received several death threats for his association with Avijit Roy since the rise of religious extremism in Bangladesh in recent years.

==== Murder ====
Dipan was brutally hacked to death by a group of suspected religious fundamentalists in the afternoon of 31 October 2015, while he was working alone inside his office at Aziz Supermarket in Dhaka. His body was found in a pool of blood by the local market authorities and his father, who had to break into Jagriti Prokashony office left locked from inside by the murders, and had several injury marks of sharp weapons like machetes. Dipan was pronounced dead as soon as his body was rushed to the nearby hospital.

Dipan's murder coincided with the attack on another publisher of Avijit Roy, Ahmedur Rashid Tutul (proprietor of Shuddhoswar Prokashony), who survived a similar brutal hacking inside his office in a different part of Dhaka in the same afternoon.

Some local sleeper cells of international terrorist groups like Al-Qaeda and the so-called Islamic State have claimed responsibilities of the attacks on secular writers, free thinkers and human rights activists in Bangladesh.

The law enforcement authorities of Bangladesh have been in active pursuit of the perpetrators with some success since their anti-terror drive has intensified following the Holy Artisan terror attacks in Gulshan.

Dipan's death was widely covered in global and local media, had sparked outrage among general public and received strong condemnation from many organisations including the UN and the US Embassy in Dhaka.

==== First death anniversary ====
Dipan Smriti Sangsad (Dipan Memorial Council) held a memorial event at the Teacher-Student Centre auditorium of Dhaka University on 31 October 2016 to mark the first anniversary of Dipan's death. Eminent academics, writers, publishers, journalists, cultural personalities and activists like Anisuzzaman, Abdullah Abu Sayeed, Abul Kashem Fazlul Haque, Ajoy Roy, Abul Barkat, AAMS Arefin Siddique, Ashraf Uddin Chowdhury, Mamunur Rashid, Shyamoli Nasrin Chowdhury, Imran H Sarker, Golam Mortaja and Khan Mahbub participated in the discussion. A book to commemorate Dipan's life and work was launched at the event.

The speakers, while addressing almost a five hundred strong audience from all walks of life, expressed deep concern and dissatisfaction at the slow progress of the murder investigation. They highlighted the prevalence of "a culture of impunity and lack of accountability" in Bangladesh that was leading to the recurrence of heinous crimes like the brutal hacking of Dipan and others.

The day was also marked by a large human chain of mourners and protesters, near Aziz Super Market in Dhaka, demanding immediate arrest and speedy trial of Dipan's killers.

All major television channels in Bangladesh provided special coverage of the event in their national news segments.

A more private memorial event was organised at the Gulshan residence of late Syed Moqsud Ali (an eminent scholar and professor of Dhaka University who had his work published from Jagriti) where a large number of Dipan's oldest friends held discussion on Dipan and offered prayers for his departed soul.

=== Ahmedur Rashid Chowdhury (Tutul) ===
Ahmedur Rashid Chowdhury Tutul, aged 43, editor and publisher of Shuddhashar In February 2015, he received a death threat, for publishing books of atheist writers and his secular view. On 31 October 2015, he was attacked by assailants with machetes. He was hospitalized in a critical condition. Ansar Al Islam (AQIS Bangladesh) claimed the responsibility.

=== Nazimuddin Samad ===
Nazimuddin Samad (1988 – 6 April 2016) was a law student at Jagannath University and liberal blogger who was reportedly killed by suspected radical Islamists in Dhaka for his promotion of secularism in Bangladesh. Unidentified assailants attacked Samad with a machete and shot him to death. However, Imran H Sarker, convener of the Gonojagaran Mancha said that the murder had been committed by government collusion in order divert attention from the rape and killing of Sohagi Jahan Tonu, a student of Comilla University. The SITE Intelligence monitoring group reported that Ansar al-Islam, the Bangladesh branch of al-Qaeda in the Indian Subcontinent (AQIS), claimed in an online statement on Friday that its members carried out the attack in “vengeance.”

=== Shahjahan Bachchu ===
Shahjahan Bachchu an acting editor of weekly Amader Bikrampur and former general secretary of Munshiganj chapter of Communist Party of Bangladesh shot dead on 11 June 2018. His daughter said to The Daily Star that when bloggers were being killed one after another in Bangladesh, her father received threats on his mobile phones on a number of occasions. He had his own publishing house "Bishaka Prokashoni". Main suspect of that murder named Abdur Rahman arrested on 24 June and according to the police press he got killed by gunfight on 28 June 2018.

=== S M Saifur Rahman ===
On the evening of 21 June 2022, a blogger and rights activist named S M Saifur Rahman was attacked in his Upazila town of Kalaroa in Satkhira. He was attacked by an Islamist group mainly for writing in favor of gay rights and women's freedom of dress. Saifur was saved due to two people, but he had to suffer for a long time with injuries and pain. The assailant threatened him that the next day, hundreds of people from the mosque would take him out of his house and beat him to death. Fearing for his life, he went to India the next day on 22 June 2022 to save his life. Earlier he has received death threats from militant fundamentalists several times. He has been writing on his blog and social media for a long time against religious bigotry and in favor of human rights.

== Broader attacks ==
After an initial wave of attacks focused solely on secularists, most of them atheists, the targets broadened to include other activists, members of religious minority groups, and representatives of Bengali or western culture. Some of these attacks are reported to have been regretted by the murderers associated with one of the perpetrating groups, Jamaat-ul-Mujahideen Bangladesh. They admitted that they had bungled their research, choosing victims who had not offended Islam but were simply popular figures in the community.

=== Kunio Hoshi ===
Kunio Hoshi (星邦男, Hoshi Kunio) was a 66-year-old Japanese man from Iwate Prefecture who was shot in Rangpur, Bangladesh, in October 2015. Hoshi was also known by the aliases Hita Kuchi and Golam Kibria. Hoshi first went to Bangladesh in 2011 and had visited every year since. He last arrived in June 2015, approximately four months before his death. Hoshi was shot three times in a remote rural region of Rangpur, where he had invested in a grass cultivation project and had leased land for 82,000 Bangladeshi taka. According to police sources, Hoshi was not a wealthy man and had come to Bangladesh to improve his condition, adding that the relatively low cost of living in Bangladesh and its rich soil drove him to try his luck in Bangladesh. The Islamic State of Iraq and the Levant ISIL claimed responsibility for killing Hoshi on Twitter, according to the SITE Intelligence Group, a US monitoring organization. His murderers told investigators that they had bungled their research and did not realize that Kunio had converted to Islam. The Japanese Embassy of Bangladesh argued that Hoshi should be buried in Bangladesh, with an Islamic-style ceremony. He was ultimately buried in Bangladesh.

=== Jogeshwar Roy ===
On 21 February 2016 Jogeshwar Roy, a senior Hindu priest, was hacked to death and two worshippers were wounded in the Panchagarh district of northern Bangladesh.

=== Rezaul Karim Siddique ===
On 23 April 2016 A. F. M. Rezaul Karim Siddique, a professor of English at the University of Rajshahi, was hacked to death by several unidentified assailants while waiting for a bus to the university campus in Rajshahi city. ISIL later claimed responsibility for his death.

=== Xulhaz Mannan and Mahbub Rabbi Tonoy ===
Two days after Siddique's murder (25 April 2016), gay-rights activists Xulhaz Mannan and Mahbub Rabbi Tonoy were hacked to death by assailants who broke into Mannan's apartment in the Kalabagan neighborhood of Dhaka. Mannan was the editor of Bangladesh's first LGBT-themed magazine Roopbaan and an employee of USAID, Bangladesh. Tonoy was a prominent theater activist and co-organizer of the Rainbow Rally 2015. Ansar al-Islam, the Bangladeshi branch of Al-Qaeda claimed responsibility for the attack.

=== Nikhil Joarder ===
On 30 April 2016 Nikhil Joarder, a Hindu tailor, was hacked to death by two assailants in Tangail in central Bangladesh, by several men on a motorcycle. Responsibility for the crime was quickly claimed by the organization Islamic State through the news agency of the terrorist group.

=== Mohammad Shahidullah ===
On 7 May 2016 suspected Islamist militants hacked to death a 65-year-old minority Sufi Muslim man, Mohammad Shahidullah, at a mango grove in Mymensingh.

=== Maung Shue U Chak ===
Maung Shue U Chak, a 75-year-old Buddhist monk, was hacked to death in the Bandarban district of southeastern Bangladesh on 14 May 2016. The Islamic State is suspected to be behind the killing.

=== Mir Sanaur Rahman and Saifuzzaman ===
Machete-wielding assailants hacked a village doctor to death and wounded a university teacher in the Kushtia district of Bangladesh on 20 May 2016. The homeopathic doctor, Mir Sanaur Rahman, 55, was killed on the spot, and his companion, identified as Saifuzzaman, 45, suffered serious wounds. Police found a bloody machete at the scene. Mir Sanaur Rahman provided free treatment to villagers, and his murderers, who belonged to Jamaat-ul-Mujahideen Bangladesh, are said to have chosen him as a target because they bungled their research when seeking possible victims.

=== Debesh Chandra Pramanik ===
On 25 May 2016 Debesh Chandra Pramanik, a 68-year-old Hindu businessman, was attacked and killed in his shoe shop at Gaibandha in Dhaka district. ISIL claimed responsibility for the attack, their second in Bangladesh in less than a week.

=== Ananda Gopal Ganguly ===
On 7 June 2016, Ananda Gopal Ganguly, a 70-year-old Hindu priest, had his throat slit by suspected Islamists in the Jhenaidaha district of the Khulna division, soon after three suspected Islamists were killed by police. He was said to have been hacked and shot at, with a cut to the throat being the death blow. Three men attacked him while he was riding on his motorcycle.

=== Nityaranjan Pande ===
On 10 June 2016 Nityaranjan Pande, a 60-year-old worker at a Hindu monastery in Pabna, was hacked to death by several people near the monastery. Islamist militants have been suspected in his death.

=== Ripon Chakraborty ===
On 15 June 2016 Ripon Chakraborty, a Hindu college teacher in the Madaripur district was attacked with machete knives at his home by three people. He survived the attack, but was seriously injured. One of the three attackers named Ghulam Faijullaha Fahim was caught while escaping and handed over to police by local people.

=== Shyamananda Das ===
On 1 July 2016 Shyamananda Das, a Hindu temple worker, was hacked to death by three suspected Islamist militants on motorcycles in the Satkhira district. Another two Hindu men, Surendra Sarkar and Tarak Saha, were reportedly injured by suspected Islamist militants in the attack although this has not been confirmed.

=== Mong Shwe Lung Marma ===
On 2 July 2016 Mong Shwe Lung Marma, a Buddhist farmer and the vice president of ward seven of the Awami league, was hacked to death and assassinated in Bandarban. The Islamic State claimed responsibility for the assassination. The victim was killed near the site of a previous killing of another Buddhist.

=== Gulshan attack ===
On 1 July 2016 at around 11:30 pm local time, six militants entered and opened fire on the Holey Artisan Bakery in Gulshan, a diplomatic neighborhood of Dhaka. They also threw bombs and took several dozen hostages. A total of 28 people were killed, including 17 foreigners, two police officers, and five gunmen. One of the gunmen was captured and 13 hostages were freed by the Bangladesh Armed Forces, police, RAB, BGB, and joint forces. According to Bangladesh's Inspector General of Police, all six of the attackers were Bangladeshi citizens.

== Disputed attacks ==
=== Mahmuda Khanam Mitu ===
On 5 June 2016 Mahmuda Khanam Mitu, the wife of a Bangladesh Police superintendent Babul Aktar, was stabbed, shot in the head, and killed by three suspected outside of her apartment at a busy road junction in Chittagong. Her six-year-old son was present with her while she was killed. Although she was not secular or atheist, but religious, initially the killing was suspected to have been done by Islamist extremists, as her husband had headed several investigations and operation raids related to the strings of killings committed by Islamist extremists in Chittagong and was awarded. The killings were however condemned by Ansar al-Islam, the suspected Bangladesh chapter of al-Qaeda in the Indian Subcontinent. However, in 2017 Mitu's father, Md Mosharraf Hossain said that circumstantial evidence led him to believe that Babul himself had orchestrated his wife's murder. This allegations arose Babul was alleged to have an extramarital affair Bonani Binte Bonni, wife of deceased Special Branch Sub-Inspector Akram Hossain Liton. Babul had been previously interrogated by police on several occasions. As of February 2017, police were investigating listed criminal Kamrul Islam Musa, a former informant who had served under Babul Aktar and his accomplice Nabi.

== Earlier attacks ==
=== Taslima Nasrin ===
In the 1990s author Taslima Nasrin achieved notoriety in Bangladesh for "her bold use of sexual imagery in her poetry, her self-declared atheism, and her iconoclastic lifestyle". In her newspaper columns and books, she criticized rising religious fundamentalism and government inaction. In early 1992 mobs began attacking book stores stocking her work. The same year she was assaulted at a book fair and her passport was confiscated. In July 1993 her novel Lajja was banned by the government for allegedly creating "misunderstanding among communities". On 23 September 1993 a fatwa was issued for her death. After international pressure, her passport was returned in April 1994, after which she traveled to France and returned via India. On 4 July 1994, an arrest warrant was issued for her under an old statute dating to the British colonial period outlawing writings "intended to outrage ... religious believers", and she went underground. After being granted bail on 3 August, Nasrin fled to Sweden, remaining in exile for some years. In 1998 she visited her critically ill mother in Bangladesh but was forced to go into hiding once again after threats and demonstrations. In 2005 she moved to India and applied for citizenship.

=== Shamsur Rahman ===
On 18 January 1999 Shamsur Rahman, a leading Bangladeshi poet, was targeted, and a failed attempt was made by Harakat-Ul-Jihad-Ul-Islami to kill him at his residence for his writings.

=== Humayun Azad ===
In 2003 Bangladeshi secular author and critic Humayun Azad wrote a book named Pak Sar Jamin Saad Baad criticising the political party, Bangladesh Jamaat-e-Islami. Azad received numerous death threats from fundamentalist groups after its publication. On 27 February 2004, he became the victim of an assassination attempt by assailants armed with machetes near the campus of the University of Dhaka during the annual Ekushey Book Fair. A week prior to that assault, Delwar Hossain Sayeedi, a Bangladesh Jamaat-e-Islami leader and then member of the parliament, demanded in the parliament that Azad's political satire Pak Sar Jamin Saad Baad be banned and called for the application of the Blasphemy Act to the author.

On 12 August 2004 Azad was found dead in his apartment in Munich, Germany, where he had arrived a week earlier to conduct research on the 19th-German romantic poet Heinrich Heine. His family demanded an investigation, alleging that the extremists who had attempted the earlier assassination had a role in this death.

== Suspects and arrests ==
On 26 April 2006 a Majlish-e-Shura member of Jama'atul Mujahideen Bangladesh named Salahuddin was arrested by RAB from Chittagong as a suspected attacker on Humayun Azad. Salahuddin, accused in 33 cases, was given the death penalty for another murder case.

On 2 March 2013 the Bangladesh Detective Bureau arrested five members of the extremist organisation Ansarullah Bangla Team for the murder of Ahmed Rajib Haider. The five, all students of North South University, confessed to the crime in front of a magistrate.

On 2 March 2015 the RAB arrested Farabi Shafiur Rahman, a radical Islamist, as a suspected murderer of Avijit Roy. It was suspected by the police that Farabi had provided Roy's location, identity, and family photographs to various people. Farabi had threatened Roy several times through blogs and social media sites including Facebook. He said on different posts and comments that Roy would be killed upon his arrival in Dhaka.

On 14 August 2015 Bangladesh police said that they had arrested two men, suspected to be members of the Ansarullah Bangla Team, in connection with the murder of Niloy Neel.

On 18 August 2015 three members of Ansarullah Bangla Team, including a British citizen named Touhidur Rahman who police described as "the main planner of the attacks on Avijit Roy and Ananta Bijoy Das", had been arrested in connection with the two murders.

=== Death sentences in the Ahmed Rajib Haider case ===
On 30 December 2015, two members of Ansarullah Bangla Team – Md Faisal Bin Nayem and Redwanul Azad Rana – were found guilty of murder and sentenced to death for Rajib Haider's murder. Faisal, the court said, was the one who attacked Haider with a meat cleaver. Rana absconded and was sentenced in absentia. Another member of the outlawed group, Maksudul Hasan, was also guilty of murder and given a life sentence. Five other members of ABT, including firebrand leader Mufti Jasim Uddin Rahmani, received jail terms of five to ten years. One person was given a term of three years.

== See also ==
- Discrimination against atheists in Bangladesh
- Freedom of religion in Bangladesh
- 2014 Bangladesh anti-Hindu violence
- Kosheh massacres, a similar event in Egypt
- Red Summer, a similar event in the United States
- First Red Scare, a similar event in the United States
- Palmer Raids, a similar event in the United States
- NATO bombing of Yugoslavia
- Buddhist crisis, a similar event in South Vietnam, (Today Vietnam)
  - Hue Vesak shooting
  - Xa Loi Pagoda raids
- Nadir of American race relations
- 2005 Alexandria riot, a similar event in Egypt
- 2011 Alexandria bombing, a similar event in Egypt
- 2005 Kyrgyz revolution, a similar event in Kyrgyzstan
- 2010 Kyrgyz revolution, a similar event in Kyrgyzstan
- 2010 South Kyrgyzstan ethnic clashes, a similar event in Kyrgyzstan
- Persecution of atheists
- Persecution of atheists in Bangladesh
- Irreligion in Bangladesh
- Political repression of cyber-dissidents
