= Blogging in Bangladesh =

Online discussion in Bangladesh

Blogging in Bangladesh is dominated by a community of around 200 blogs. Some personal blogs have been around since the mid-2000s, but there are now blogs about self help, cities, science, law, digital marketing, entrepreneurship, and fashion magazines.

== Niche blogs ==
=== Tribune Journal ===
Tribune Journal posts current affairs and analysis, as well as opinions and commentaries from multiple authors in Bengali. Alongside original content, the Tribune Journal posts Bengali translations of commentaries originally written in English and published on European or U.S. platforms and media outlets.

=== Lawyers Club Bangladesh ===
Lawyers Club Bangladesh posts news and updates associated with law and legal affairs in both Bengali and English. The blog also posts opinions relating to legal affairs.

=== Bangladesh Law Blog ===
Bangladesh Law Blog posts brief English commentaries on only the important legislative amendments. The blog, therefore, posts in long intervals, only when a legislation has an important amendment.

=== Aspect Dhaka ===
Aspect Dhaka is a Bengali-language journal documenting and analysing developments in geopolitics, international relations, strategic affairs, economics, defence, security and technology, with a focus on Bangladesh and world affairs.

=== Dhaka Law Blog ===
Dhaka Law Blog posts brief Bengali commentaries on only the important legislative amendments. The blog, therefore, posts in long intervals, only when a legislation has an important amendment.

== Notable bloggers ==
Notable bloggers from Bangladesh include Avijit Roy, Asif Mohiuddin, Ahmedur Rashid Chowdhury, Ahmed Rajib Haider, Bonya Ahmed, Sunny Sanwar, Shahidul Alam.

== Violence against bloggers ==
Since 2013, some bloggers in Bangladesh have been attacked and killed by Islamic extremists.
