= 2013 Bengali blog blackout =

Online protest in Bangladesh

Picture used by online activists to show the solidarity with 2013 Bengali blog blackout

On 4 April 2013 (07:00 GMT) all Bengali blogs were blacked out for an indefinite time to protest the arrest of four bloggers in Bangladesh (Moshiur Rahman Biplob, Rasel Pervez, Subrata Adhikari Shuvo and Asif Mohiuddin). The blackout was to back a demand for the unconditional release of the arrested bloggers. A fundamentalist group named Hefajat-e-Islam Bangladesh started a campaign to hang freethinking bloggers, and demanding tough blasphemy laws. In response, the government started monitoring Bengali blog sites and sending letters to their authorities to terminate the alleged "anti-religious" blogs and provide information about the alleged "anti-religious" bloggers. Individual bloggers showed their solidarity with this blackout by changing their profile photos on Facebook and by tweeting with the #MuzzleMeNot hashtag. Different international organizations expressed deep concern about taking free-thinking bloggers into custody. After 92 hours of blackout, blogs returned online by publishing a press release on their central Facebook page.

== Background ==
From the beginning of the Shahbag protest, bloggers came out on the streets to demand capital punishment of Abdul Quader Molla, a war criminal of the Bangladesh liberation war and a leader of Bangladesh Jamaat-e-Islami. During the protests, a controversial author, pro-Shahbag blogger and online activist Sunnyur Rahman, popularly known as 'Nastik Nobi' (Atheist Prophet) in the blog community, was stabbed on 7 March 2013. Another pro-Shahbag blogger Ahmed Rajib Haider who was critical of Jamaat-e-Islami, was killed by a few Jamaat activists. Afterwards, a Jamaat backed Islamic fundamentalist organisation started a violent protest demanding the death penalty for all allegedly "anti-Islamic" bloggers, and they termed all participants of the Shahbag movement as atheist. The spokesperson of the Shahbag movement Imran H. Sharkar said, Hifazat-e-Islam is desperate to thwart the war crimes trial and the process of banning Jamaat-e-Islami.

Afterwards, the government of Bangladesh started monitoring the blogosphere and sent letters to the Bengali blog authorities to terminate the alleged "anti-religious" blogs and to provide information about the alleged "anti-religious" bloggers.

On the night of 1 April 2013, three bloggers were arrested by the detective branch (DB) police. Blogger Rasel Pervez, a prominent physicist and blogger and Mashiur Rahman Biplob were arrested on 1 April 2013 from their house. Subrata Adhikari Shuvo, who is a masters student of the Bengali department at the University of Dhaka, was also arrested on the same day from his university dormitory.
Another blogger Asif Mohiuddin was called to the police station on 3 April 2013, and when he went there, he was arrested. Earlier, the Bangladesh Telecommunication Regulatory Commission forced the Bengali blog somewhereinblog.net to remove all writings of Asif Mohiuddin. The move was criticized by Human Rights Watch, Amnesty International, Center for Inquiry, Reporters Without Borders, Committee to Protect Journalists, and several other bodies.

== See also ==
- Avijit Roy
- Worldwide Protests for Free Expression in Bangladesh
