= Worldwide Protests for Free Expression in Bangladesh =

The 2013 Worldwide Protests for Free Expression in Bangladesh were a series of rallies outside Bangladeshi embassies and consulates to demand the release of four Bangladeshi bloggers who had been arrested on charges of blasphemy. The protests took place on 25 April – 2 May 2013 and were organised by the Center for Inquiry (CFI), American Atheists, and the International Humanist and Ethical Union. Demonstrations were held in Dhaka, New York City, Washington, D.C., London, Ottawa and other cities around the world. Secularists sought to express their solidarity with those jailed for speaking their minds about religion. Protesters drew attention to those who were being persecuted for exercising free speech, seeking to convince the international community to exert influence to have the bloggers set free by the Bangladeshi government.

== Background ==
The events that sparked the rallies began during the shahbag protest when Bangladeshis rallied on the streets to demand capital punishment for Abdul Quader Molla, a war criminal of the Bangladesh liberation war and a leader of Bangladesh Jamaat-e-Islami. During the protests, Ahmed Rajib Haider, a blogger who was critical of Jamaat-e-Islami, was stabbed to death by Jamaat activists Another controversial author, blogger & online activist named Sunnyur Rahman, popularly known as 'Nastik Nobi' (Atheist Prophet) in the blog community, was also stabbed on 7 March 2013.

Members of hardline Muslim group, Hifazat-e-Islam, backed by Jamaat, began a violent protest demanding authorities enact harsh anti-blasphemy laws to punish those who insult Islam, calling the bloggers "anti-Islamic" and terming all participants of the shahbag movement "atheists."

In response to these events, the government of Bangladesh set up a panel to monitor blasphemy on social media and blocked a number of blogs and websites. Four bloggers were arrested for posting "anti-religious" comments on their blogs. Rasel Pervez, a science teacher, and Mashiur Rahman Biplob were arrested at their homes on 1 April 2013. Subrata Adhikari Shuvo, a masters student at the University of Dhaka was arrested on the same day at his dormitory. Asif Mohiuddin was arrested on 3 April 2013 at his sister's home where he was staying after having been stabbed by Islamist fanatics in January.

The Bangladesh Telecommunication Regulatory Commission compelled the Bengali blog somewhereinblog.net to remove the writings of Asif Mohiuddin. The current blog page reads: "blog has been withdrawn or cancelled for violating terms and conditions" (transl.) The move was criticised by Human Rights Watch, Amnesty International, the Center for Inquiry, Reporters Without Borders, the Committee to Protect Journalists, and several other bodies. Prominent Bangladeshi blog sites organized the 2013 Bengali blog blackout to protest the government's decision to arrest the bloggers. They were able to garner attention from western media, which eventually led the secularist and humanist bodies to organize the worldwide protests.

Parvez and Shuvo were released on bail on 12 May and Biplob on 12 June. Asif secured bail on 27 June after spending three months in jail.

== Protests ==
The protests were organised by Michael De Dora, the director of the CFI's Office of Policy and the organization's representative to the U.N., and coordinated by Avijit Roy, the founder of Mukto-Mona, an independent site for free thinkers and skeptics of Bengali origin. Maryam Namazie, an Iranian-born activist, independently called for 25 April to be an international day to defend Bangladesh's bloggers and activists. Many writers, activists, and prominent intellectuals around the world including Taslima Nasrin, Hemant Mehta, PZ Myers publicly expressed their solidarity and support.
