= Asif Mohiuddin =

Bangladeshi blogger and activist (born 1984)

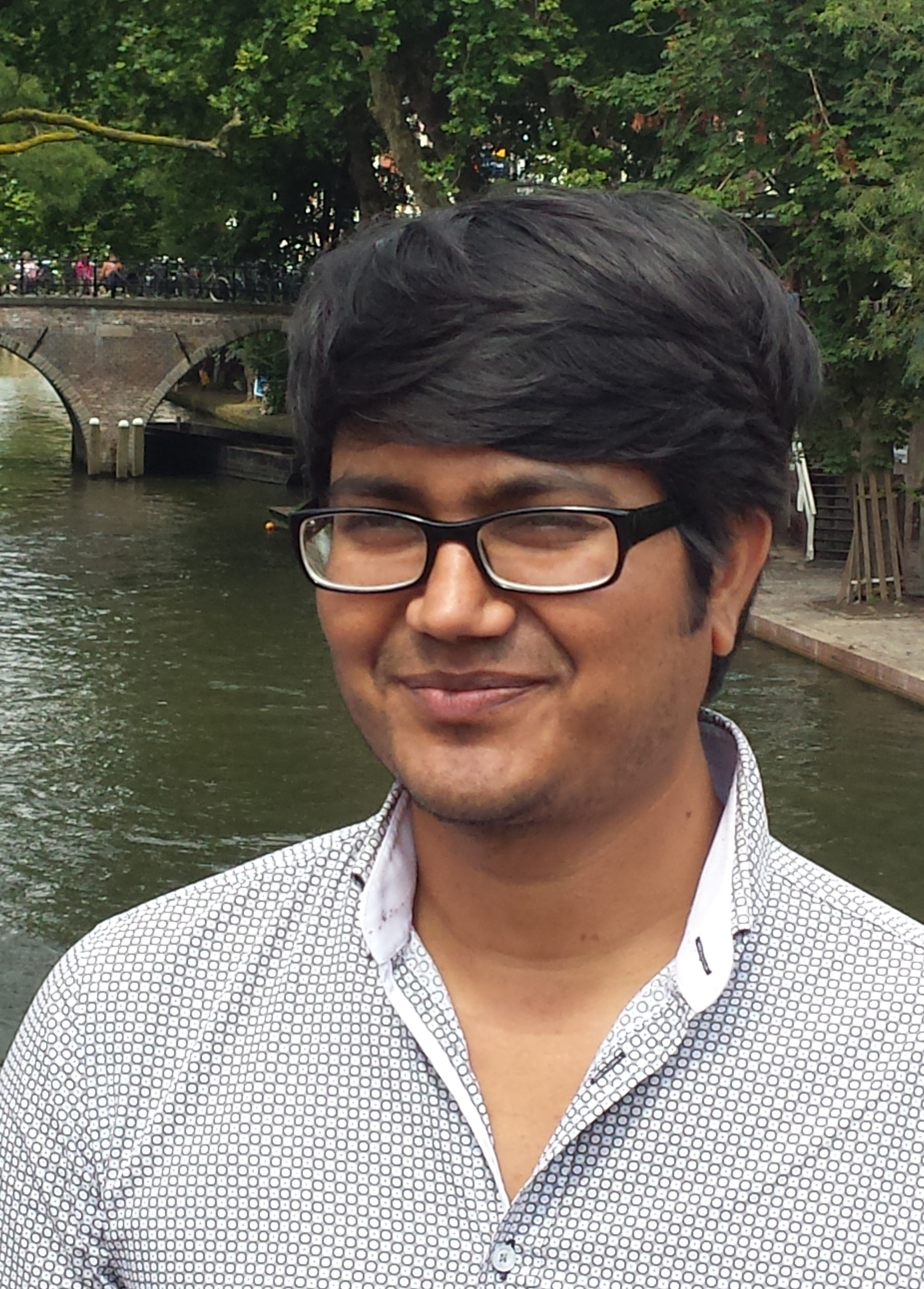
- Asif Mohiuddin at the European Humanist Youth Days 2016 in Utrecht, Netherlands.
- Born: 24 February 1984 (age 42); Dhaka, Bangladesh
- Occupation: Secular activist
- Children: 2 (Siddhartha) and (Rishabh)
- Awards: The Bobs-Best of Online Activism
- Asif Mohiuddin's voice Recorded July 2016

Asif Mohiuddin (born 24 February 1984) is a Bangladeshi atheist and secular activist, religious critic and feminist. In 2012, he won The Bobs-Best of Online Activism award from Deutsche Welle, who stated that "Asif's blog was one of the most read web pages in Bangladesh and is known for its strong criticism of Islamic fundamentalism in Bangladesh's "anti-people politics", his blog was later blocked and banned in Bangladesh by its government. On 15 January 2013, he survived an assassination attempt by Islamic extremists. A few months later, he was imprisoned twice by the Bangladesh Government for posting "offensive comments about Islam and Mohammad". Due to sustained international pressure, Mohiuddin was released, after which he fled from his country to Germany in 2014. In 2015, he received the Anna Politkovskaya Award for Journalism, awarded by Italian magazine Internazionale.

== Biography ==
=== Youth and education ===
Mohiuddin was born and raised a Muslim family in Dhaka as the son of a middle-ranking civil servant. Studying religion at the mosque after school, he said "I learned many ridiculous things – that I would get virgins in heaven, or that I would suffer the ultimate punishment in hell for eternity." To the grief of his parents, he increasingly questioned the religious doctrines he had been taught. Because of the critical questions and his irreverent answers towards the teachers, he was often harshly beaten up by them. At the age of 13, he declared himself an atheist.

Mohiuddin began to read about science, and from age 16 (2000) started to challenge allegedly unscientific claims made by Islamists by writing opinion pieces in Dhaka newspapers. This started when he read an article in a science magazine in Bengali that attempted to reconcile the miracles described in the Quran with modern science and in some way explain in a rational scientific manner. Mohiuddin said that it was scientifically impossible Muhammad flew to heaven on a mythical flying steed. This and other critical to ironic contributions in Bengali newspapers from Dhaka gave rise to his reputation as a freethinker and a critic of religion. It also brought him into contact with other similarly minded online activists.

The school beatings persisted until he went to college. There, he began to engage himself in politics, against police violence, for women's rights and for more democracy. In 2006 he started blogging. In 2008 he obtained a degree in computer science. Mohiuddin organised the first meeting of Bangladeshi freethinkers, atheists, agnostics and other nonbelievers in Dhaka in 2010, which was attended by 34 people.

=== Attack and imprisonment ===
Mohiuddin wrote articles criticising male chauvinism, domestic violence and the death penalty for apostasy in Islam, leading to fundamentalists calling for his death. In 2013 Mohiuddin was attacked and stabbed outside his house by four youths, inspired by Al-Qaeda leader Anwar Al-Awlaki. A month later, Bangladeshi bloggers and online activists started the 2013 Shahbag protests, leading to Islamist groups, including Hefazat-e-Islam, assembling over a million people in counter-demonstrations that called for blasphemy laws in the country, and attacks on secularists in Bangladesh. Rewards were offered for anyone who would behead secularist bloggers. He was mentioned in an open letter by Shah Ahmad Shafi, who labeled him an apostate and accused him of being one of the founders of the Shahbag protests. The Bangladesh government imprisoned bloggers, including Mohiuddin, and blocked many websites.

In March 2013 Mohiuddin's blog on the public blogging site somewhereinblog.net, was shut down by the Bangladesh Telecommunication Regulatory Commission, a move protested by the 2013 Bengali blog blackout. In April, Mohiuddin was arrested for "blasphemous" posts, along with three other bloggers. The crackdown on independent blogs, and the closure of the newspaper Amar Desh, was strongly criticised by Human Rights Watch and IHEU. Shortly after the bloggers were arrested, Mukto-Mona, an independent site of freethinkers and atheists of mainly Bengali and South Asian descent, issued a statement titled, 'Bangladesh government squishing freedom of speech by arresting and harassing young bloggers inside the country'. Amnesty International also issued a statement titled, 'Bangladesh: writers at risk of torture'. The Center for Inquiry (CFI), requested the US Secretary of State John Kerry "pressure the government of Bangladesh to reverse its policy of arresting atheist bloggers who were critical to religion." They sent a letter to Ambassador-at-Large for International Religious Freedom Suzan Johnson Cook "to do all they can to raise public awareness of this situation." Other influential organisations such as the Free Society Institute of South Africa, Reporters Without Borders, Committee to Protect Journalists, Global Voice Advocacy, and several other bodies also called for the immediate release of the Bangladeshi bloggers and appealed to several foreign authorities to press Bangladesh on the issue.

Worldwide protest and demonstrations were held on 25 April and 2 May 2013, to put pressure on the Bangladeshi government to free the arrested bloggers. Several humanist groups (including CFU, CFI-Canada, the British Humanist Association, American Atheists, Secular Coalition for America, and Freethinkers of University of Missouri's campus) took part in cities the US, Canada, the UK, and Bangladesh. Many writers, activists, and prominent intellectuals around the world including Salman Rushdie, Taslima Nasrin, Hemant Mehta, Maryam Namazie, PZ Myers, Avijit Roy, Anu Muhammad, Ajoy Roy, Qayyum Chowdhury, Ramendu Majumdar, Muhammad Zafar Iqbal publicly expressed their solidarity with the arrested bloggers. Three of the arrested bloggers eventually were released on bail, however the court denied bail for Asif Mohiuddin and he was sent to prison on 2 June 2013. He was released after three months but still faces charges. Now he lives in Berlin, Germany.

=== Flight to Germany and continued activism ===
Asif Mohiuddin speaking in Utrecht, Netherlands.
Recorded July 2016

Since April 2014, Asif Mohiuddin lives in Germany, initially with a scholarship from the Hamburg-based Stiftung für politisch Verfolgte (Foundation for the Politically Repressed) and later also with the support of Amnesty International.

In an interview with Deutsche Welle in April 2014 he stated that he does not feel completely safe in Germany either. Just a few days before, someone posted on Facebook a call to travel to Germany and kill him. The post received 1200 likes and was shared many times. Even with some Muslims living in Germany or migrants from Muslim-majority countries to Germany, his views have been met with a strong rejection. After his one-year scholarship, Mohiuddin decided to stay in Germany, instead of returning to Bangladesh as planned. By that time, he had become the Islamists' "Enemy no. #1".

Asif Mohiuddin speaking at the American Atheists Convention 2015.

Mohiuddin did not change his Internet activities. Because of the closure of his old blog, he resumed spreading his views on Facebook and other online channels. He is engaged as a speaker at various congresses and events, including the American Atheists National Convention in Memphis, Tennessee on 29 June 2015.

=== Anti-state case ===
On 5 May 2020, under the Digital Security Act, RAB-3 Warrant Officer Mohammad Abu Bakar Siddique accused a Facebook page called "I am Bangladeshi" of spreading anti-state propagation, rumour about epidemic COVID-19, spreading rumors with cartoons of various leaders of the ruling Awami League party and creating confusion among the people. A case was filed against 11 convicts, of which six people were accused of running the page and also five others were made convict, including Asif Mohiuddin, who were accused of having private conversations with them on WhatsApp and Messenger.

== Impact ==
The assassination attempt against Mohiuddin in January 2013, that was widely covered at home and abroad, was in a sense the public launch of a series of murders of bloggers, secularists and critics of Islamism in Bangladesh, which continues to this day, claiming 48 casualties (July 2016) so far. Mohiuddin also attributes the fact that he has survived to why he has attracted a great deal of international attention. In particular, the English-language service of Deutsche Welle reported many times about him.

== See also ==
- Attacks by Islamic extremists in Bangladesh
