= Wasi Ahmed =

Bangladeshi novelist and short story writer

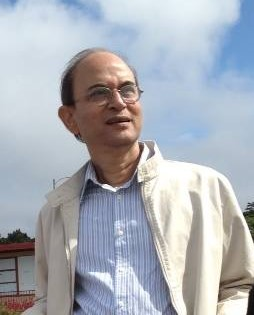
- Born: 31 October 1954; Sylhet, Bangladesh
- Education: University of Dhaka (B.A., M.A.)
- Occupations: Former civil servant and diplomat, Writer, Editorial consultant at The Financial Express
- Spouse: Naseha Chawdhury
- Writing career
- Language: Bangla
- Website: wasiahmed.com

Wasi Ahmed (Bengali: ওয়াসি আহমেদ) is a Bangladeshi novelist and short story writer. His works in original and in translation have been anthologized in Bangladesh, India, Sri Lanka and the UK. He has co-authored and edited an anthology of South Asian short stories. Formerly a civil servant and diplomat, he is currently associated with the English daily The Financial Express as consulting editor, and contributes to a number of Bangla and English dailies. Among others, he contributes a weekly post-editorial column for The Financial Express.

== Early life and education ==
He was born in Sylhet, Bangladesh. He obtained his bachelor's and master's degree in English literature from University of Dhaka. He married Naseha Chawdhury on 5 August 1983.

== Literary career ==
Writing since Early eighties. Language: Bengali, English
Major Field of writing: Short stories, novels
Focus of Writing: One of the key areas that essentially characterises his writings, according to renowned critic Topodhir Bhattacharjee, is his interpretation of the reality of his time, often disguised under the garb of surface reality.

Others:

- Book reviews in English and Bangla, Articles on contemporary literature, Translation of contemporary short fiction from English into Bangla and vice versa. Writes weekly post-editorial column for the daily Financial Express on trade and economic affairs
- Participated in the International Writing Program (IWP) Fall Residency of outstanding global writers at the University of Iowa, Iowa city, USA (20 August- 8 November 2016)
- Served twice (2013 and 2015) as jury for the Prothom Alo Book of the Year award.
- Attended a number of translation workshops
- Presented keynote papers at a number of literary events organized by BRAC University, Shahitto Shova, Lekhok Shibir (Writers’ Union), The daily Prothom Alo

== Works ==
=== Translated Work ===
- The Overtakers, ISBN 978984200581-7, Publisher: Adorn Publication, 22 Segunbagicha Dhaka 1000. Year 2018

=== Short stories ===
- Shishijapon (Collection of Short Stories), ISBN 9789849626572, Publisher: Kathaprokash, Kathaprokash, www.kathaprokash.com. Year 2022
- Shoitto Probaho (Collection of Short Stories), ISBN 9789849302469, Publisher:Abul Khayer, Bengal Publication, Bengal Centre, Plot 2, Civil Aviation New Airport Road, Khilkhet, Dhaka1229. Year 2018
- Bok o Banshful (collection of 10 stories), ISBN 9789843389817, Publisher: Bengal Publications Ltd, Bengal Center, New Airport Rd, Khilkhet, Dhaka 1229. Year 2015
- Kalashnikover Golap (collection of 10 stories), ISBN 9789849006640, Publisher: Shuddhashar, Aziz Super Market, Shahbagh, Dhaka1200. Year 2012
- Nirbachito Golpo (selected stories), ISBN 9789848837856, Publisher: Shuddhashar, Aziz Super Market, Shahbagh, Dhaka1200. Year 2011
- Tri Shimana (collection of 8 stories), Publisher: Oitijjya, 68/69 Paridas Rd, Banglabazar, Dhaka1100. Year 2009
- Shinga bajabe Israfil (collection of 9 stories), ISBN 984776400X, Publisher: Oitijjya, 68/69 Paridas Rd, Banglabazar, Dhaka 1100. Year 2006
- Tepantorer Sanko (collection of 8 stories), ISBN 9847760411, Publisher: Oitijjya, 68/69 Paridas Rd, Banglabazar, Dhaka 1100. Year 2001
- Beejmontro (collection of 8 stories), ISBN 9844150620, Publisher: Obosor Prokashona Sangstha, 46/1 HemendraDas Rd, Sutrapur, Dhaka1100. Year 1998

=== Novels ===
- Roudro O Chayar Noksha, ISBN 9789849649830, Publisher: Kathaprokash, www.kathaprokash.com. Year 2022
- Borof Kol, ISBN 9789845101660, Publisher: Kotha Prokash, 87 Aziz Co-Operative Super Market (3rd floor), Shahbag, Dhaka 1000, Bangladesh. Year 2021
- Eka Doka, ISBN 9789849300212, Publisher: Prothom Prokashon, C A Bhaban, 100 Kazi Nazrul Islam Avenue, Daka 1215. Year 2017
- Tolkuthurir Gan, ISBN 9789849120094, Publisher: Prothoma Prokashon, C A Bhaban, 100 Kazi Nazrul Islam Avenue, Dhaka 1215. Year 2015
- Sheet Pakhira, ISBN 9789848837818, Publisher: Shuddhashar, Aziz Super Market, Shahbagh, Dhaka 1200. Year 2011
- Meghpahar, ISBN 9847760209, Publisher: Oitijjya, 68/69 Paridas Rd, Banglabazar, Dhaka 1100. Year 2000

=== Children's Fiction ===
- Ek Je Chhilam Ami, ISBN 9840903357, Bangladesh Shishu Academy, Doyel Chattar, Shahbag, Dhaka-1000. Year 1995

=== Translated stories in major anthologies ===
- The Book of Dhaka: A City in Short Fiction, ISBN 190558380X, Comma Press (commapress.co.uk). UK publishing date 14 July 2016
- On the side of the Enemy: Short Stories in Translation, ISBN 9789843382634, edited and translated by Khademul Islam, published by Bengal Lights Book, Green Akshay Plaza, House 52, Road 2/1 Dhanmondi, Dhaka1209. Year 2015
- Voices of Asia: An Anthology of SAARC Fiction, edited by Ajit Cour and Pankaj Bhan, published by the Foundation of SAARC Writers and Literature, 4/6 Siri Fort Institutional Area, New Delhi110 049, India. Year 2002

== Awards ==
- 2021: Abu Rushd Literary Award
- 2019: Bagla Academy Literary Award
- 2015: Akhtaruzzaman Elias Book of the Year Award (for the novel Tolkuthurir Gaan)
- 2015: IFIC Bank Literary Award (for the novel Tolkuthurir Gaan)
- 2012: Prothom Alo Book of the Year Award (for story collection Kalashnikover Golap)
- 2010: Jemcon Literary Award 2010 (for story collection Trishimana)
