= Avijit Roy =

Bangladeshi-American engineer, blogger and writer

- অভিজিৎ রায়
- Born: 12 September 1972; Bangladesh
- Died: 26 February 2015 (aged 42); Dhaka, Bangladesh
- Cause of death: Murder by Islamic extremist organisation Ansarullah Bangla Team
- Education: BS in mechanical engineering; MS and PhD in biomedical engineering
- Alma mater: BUET (BS); National University of Singapore (MS, PhD)
- Occupations: Engineer, blogger, writer
- Years active: 2001-2015
- Known for: Blogging in Bangladesh
- Notable work: New Atheism, science, anarchism and religion, homosexuality
- Spouse: Rafida Ahmed Bonya
- Children: Trisha Ahmed
- Parent(s): Ajoy Roy (father); Shefali Roy (mother)

Avijit Roy (Bengali: অভিজিৎ রায়; 12 September 1972 – 26 February 2015) was a Bangladeshi-American engineer, online activist, writer, and blogger known for creating and administrating the Mukto-Mona, an Internet blogging community for Bangladeshi freethinkers, rationalists, skeptics, atheists, and humanists. Roy was an advocate of free expression in Bangladesh and coordinated international protests against government censorship and imprisonment of atheist bloggers. He was killed by machete-wielding assailants in Dhaka, Bangladesh, on 26 February 2015; the Islamic militant organization Ansarullah Bangla Team claimed responsibility for the attack.

== Early life and education ==
Avijit Roy was the son of Ajoy Roy, a professor of physics at the University of Dhaka, who received the Ekushey Padak award. Avijit earned a bachelor's degree in mechanical engineering from BUET, and a master's and doctoral degree in biomedical engineering from the National University of Singapore.

== Career ==
In 2006, he moved to Atlanta, Georgia, and worked as a software engineer.

=== Mukto-Mona ===
Roy was the founder of the Bangladeshi Mukto-Mona website, which was nominated for The Bobs (Best of Blogs) Award in the Best of Online Activism category. It was originally a Yahoo! group in May 2001, but became a website in 2002.

Roy described his writing as "taboo" in Bangladesh. He had received death threats from fundamentalist bloggers for his articles and books. Rokomari.com, a Bangladeshi e-commerce site, stopped selling Roy's books after its owner received death threats from Islamists.

=== Protests and advocacy ===
We aim to build a society which will not be bound by the dictates of arbitrary authority, comfortable superstition, stifling tradition, or suffocating orthodoxy but would rather be based on reason, compassion, humanity, equality, and science.

— Avijit Roy

A Bangladeshi group, Blogger and Online Activist Network (BOAN), initiated the 2013 Shahbag protests that sought capital punishment for the Islamist leader and war criminal Abdul Quader Molla, as well as the removal of Jamaat-e-Islami from politics. Islamist groups responded by organizing protests calling for the execution of "atheist bloggers" accused of insulting Islam and the introduction of a blasphemy law. Many atheist bloggers who supported the Shahbag protests were attacked, and Ahmed Rajib Haider was killed by Islamist groups on 15 February 2013. A month before the protest, blogger Asif Mohiuddin was attacked outside his house by four youths influenced by Anwar Al-Awlaki, and Sunnyur Rahman, known as Nastik Nobi ("Atheist Prophet"), was stabbed on 7 March 2013.

Asif Mohiuddin, a winner of the BOBs award for online activism, was on an Islamist hit list that also included the murdered sociology professor Shafiul Islam. His blog was shut down by the Bangladesh Telecommunication Regulatory Commission, and he was jailed for posting "offensive comments about Islam and Mohammed". The secular government arrested several other bloggers, and blocked about a dozen websites and blogs and gave police protection to some bloggers.

International organizations, including the Human Rights Watch, Amnesty International, Reporters Without Borders and the Committee to Protect Journalists condemned the imprisonment of bloggers and the climate of fear for journalists.

Roy wrote that he was disgusted that the Bangladeshi media portrayed young bloggers as "crooks in the public eye" and wrote to Western media outlets, the Center for Inquiry, and the International Humanist and Ethical Union for support. Roy went on to coordinate international protests in Dhaka, New York City, Washington, D.C., London, Ottawa, and other cities in support of the jailed bloggers. He was joined by writers, activists, and prominent secularists and intellectuals around the world including Salman Rushdie, Taslima Nasrin, Hemant Mehta, Maryam Namazie, PZ Myers, Anu Muhammad, Ajoy Roy, Qayyum Chowdhury, Ramendu Majumdar and Muhammad Zafar Iqbal in publicly expressing their solidarity with the arrested bloggers.

== Murder ==
In 2015, Roy went to Dhaka with his wife Bonya Ahmed during the Ekushey Book Fair. On the evening of 26 February, he and Bonya were returning home from the fair by bicycle rickshaw. At around 8:30 pm, they were attacked near the Teacher-Student Centre intersection of Dhaka University by unidentified assailants. According to witnesses, two assailants stopped and dragged them from the rickshaw to the pavement before striking them with machetes. Roy was struck and stabbed with sharp weapons in the head. His wife was slashed on her shoulders, and the fingers of her left hand were severed. Both of them were rushed to Dhaka Medical College Hospital, where Roy was pronounced dead around 10:30 pm. Ahmed survived. In an interview with BBC's Newshour, she said that police stood nearby when they were attacked but did not act.

In a Twitter post on the day after his death, an Islamist group called Ansar Bangla-7 claimed responsibility for the killing. Ansar Bangla-7 is said to be the same organization as the Ansarullah Bangla Team. A case of murder was filed by Roy's father without naming any suspects at Shahbagh on 27 February 2015. Police sources stated that they were investigating a local Islamist group that praised the killing.

Avijit's body was placed at Aparajeyo Bangla in front of the Faculty of Arts building at Dhaka University on 1 March 2015, where people from all walks of life, including his friends, relatives, well-wishers, teachers, and students, gathered with flowers to pay their respect to the writer. As per Roy's wish, his body was handed over to Dhaka Medical College for medical research.

On 6 March 2015, a four-member team from the Federal Bureau of Investigation (FBI), along with members of the detective branch of Bangladesh Police, inspected the spot where Roy was killed. The FBI members collected evidence from the site and took the footage to help investigate.

On 3 May 2015, the leader of Al-Qaeda in the Indian Subcontinent (AQIS) claimed responsibility for Roy's murder and the deaths of other "blasphemers" in Bangladesh in a report published by the SITE Intelligence Group.

=== Arrests ===
On 2 March 2015, the Rapid Action Battalion arrested Farabi Shafiur Rahman, a radical Islamist. Farabi was believed to have shared Roy's personal information, including location, with the assailants. Rahman had threatened Roy several times through blogs and social media sites including Facebook, and said that Roy would be killed upon his arrival in Dhaka.

Bangladesh's government decided to seek help from the FBI to investigate Roy's murder. The decision was taken following an offer by the United States.

On 18 August 2015, three members of the Ansarullah Bangla Team, including a British citizen named Touhidur Rahman, who police described as "the main planner of the attacks on Avijit Roy and Ananta Bijoy Das", were arrested in connection with the two murders.

In February 2021, five leaders and members of the banned militant outfit Ansar al-Islam were sentenced to death and another to life in prison for Roy's murder.

=== Reactions ===
After Roy's death, several students, teachers, bloggers, and around the country gathered at Dhaka University, demanding quick arrest of the killers. Mukto-Mona wrote in Bengali "We are grieving but we shall overcome".

Secretary-General of the United Nations spokesperson Stéphane Dujarric condemned the killing and said, "On the attack of the blogger, we spoke to our human rights colleagues who condemned the attack and expressed the hope that the perpetrators will be quickly brought to justice through the due process of law."

The head of Reporters Without Borders Asia-Pacific stated, "We are shocked by this act of barbarity" and added, "It is unacceptable for [police] to spend so much time searching news outlets, arresting journalists, censoring news and investigating bloggers when the many attacks on bloggers are still unpunished."

The CEO of Index on Censorship, Jodie Ginsberg, said: "Our sympathies are with the family of Avijit Roy. Roy was targeted simply for expressing his beliefs, and we are appalled by his death and condemn all such killings."

The Asia Program Coordinator of the Committee to Protect Journalists stated, "This attack is emblematic of the culture of impunity that pervades Bangladesh, where the lack of accountability in previous attacks on the press continues to spurn [sic] a deadly cycle of violence."

Humanist groups expressed horror at Roy's death. The Center for Inquiry's chief UN representative stated, "Avijit was brilliant, yes, and a devoted advocate of free expression and secularism, but also just a very good person." Andrew Copson of the British Humanist Association, which awarded Roy and other bloggers the Free Expression Award in 2014, said, "With Avijit's death, Bangladesh has lost not just a son, but a forceful proponent of human rights and equality for all its people."

The British High Commissioner Robert Gibson expressed his concern in a tweet saying, "Shocked by the savage murder of Avijit Roy as I am by all the violence that has taken place in Bangladesh in recent months".

In December 2021, the United States Department of State announced a $5m bounty for information leading to the perpetrators of the terrorist attack on Roy and Ahmed.

== Legacy ==
In 2018, the Freedom From Religion Foundation introduced the annual Avijit Roy Courage Award, which is given to "individuals working toward the spread of rational and logical discourse, and recognize creative and heroic individuals who have persisted, despite hurdles, in their work to promote science, logic, and humane ideas".

== Works ==
- Roy, Avijit (2005). Alo Hate Choliyache Andharer Jatri আলো হাতে চলিয়াছে আঁধারের যাত্রী [Caravan of Darkness Walking With Light in Hand] (in Bengali). Dhaka: Ankur Prakashani. ISBN 9844641241.
- —— (2007). Mahabishe Pran O Budhimattar Khonje মহাবিশ্বে প্রাণ ও বুদ্ধিমত্তার খোঁজে [In Search of Life And Intelligence in the Universe] (in Bengali). Dhaka: Obshor Prokashan. ISBN 978-9844152120.
- —— (2008). Bisshash Er Virus বিশ্বাসের ভাইরাস [The Virus of Faith] (in Bengali). Dhaka: Shuddhashar Prokashani.
- —— (2010). Somokamita: Ekti Boigganik Ebong Shomaj Monostattik Onushandhan সমকামিতা : একটি বৈজ্ঞানিক এবং সমাজ-মনস্তাত্বিক অনুসন্ধান [Homosexuality: A Scientific and socio-psychological investigation] (in Bengali). Dhaka: Somokamita. OCLC 969997954.
- Abir, Raihan; —— (2011). Obisshahser Dorshon অবিশ্বাসের দর্শন [The Philosophy of Disbelief] (in Bengali). Dhaka: Jagriti Prokashoni. ISBN 978-984-8972-02-1.
- —— (2014). Bisshash Er Virus: Bisshash Er Bibortinio Bishleshon বিশ্বাসের ভাইরাস: বিশ্বাসের বিবর্তনীয় বিশ্লেষণ) (in Bengali). Dhaka: Jagriti Prokashoni. ISBN 9789849091455.

== See also ==
- Attacks on secularists in Bangladesh
- Murder of Sagar Sarowar and Meherun Runi
- Political repression of cyber-dissidents
- List of journalists killed in Bangladesh
