= Younus Shaikh =

Pakistani medical doctor, human rights activist

Mohammed Younus Shaikh (Punjabi, Urdu: محمد یونس شیخ, born 30 May 1952) is a Pakistani medical doctor, human rights activist and freethinker.

When he was a teacher at a medical college in Islamabad, Shaikh was an active member of the South Asia Peace Movement and of the International Humanist and Ethical Union (IHEU). He took part in the Pakistan-India Forum for Peace and Democracy, and was a member of the Human Rights Commission of Pakistan. A free-thinker, he founded Enlightenment, an organization associated with the IHEU.

In October 2000, Pakistani authorities charged Shaikh with blasphemy. A judge ordered that he pay a fine of 100,000 rupees, and sentenced him to death by hanging. On appeal, on 20 November 2003, a court acquitted Shaikh, who fled Pakistan for Europe soon thereafter.

== Background ==
Younes M. Shaikh is a qualified medical doctor who was arrested under, Pakistani Blasphemy Law 295/C merely on the accusation of being an Ahmadi and yet talking about Islam and the Prophet of Islam, which the Ahmadis are not allowed to; although he was a born Muslim and not an Ahmadi only that he strongly felt that the Ahmadis were wrongfully persecuted, and so he wrote letters about this to authorities in Pakistan, the foreign embassies in Islamabad; to members of the United Nations and to human rights organizations all over the world; he was a member of the Human Rights Commission of Pakistan, Islamabad. Dr. Younes M SHEIKH was born on 30 May 1952 in Chishtian, Pakistan. He studied and qualified as a medical doctor in Multan. In Dublin and London, he did post-graduate studies and worked as a trainee surgeon there from 1981 to 1988. After graduation as a doctor, he worked in Lahore, Pakistan for a few years. He also took membership of Human Rights organisations like Amnesty International and SCCL, NCCL. On his return to Pakistan, he worked at Aga Khan University Hospital, Karachi, practised as a general medical practitioner, then taught at Capital Medical College, G/9 Markaz Islamabad Islamabad.

Shaikh studied Journalism in his free time and attained a diploma in Journalism from Islamabad. He was active in intellectual, literary and social circles and he regularly attended the meetings of the Halqa Arbab i Zoaq in Lahore and later in Rawalpindi and Islamabad. He was an active member of the Human Rights Commission of Pakistan in Islamabad. Shaikh attracted the attention of Islamic fundamentalists because he had protested against the abuse of loudspeakers from mosques which caused pain and discomfort to babies, children, and his clinic patients. He often spoke out against extremist Islamic mullahs and their atrocities; particularly against one of his Ahmadi medical friends whose clinics and houses in Burewala were burnt down. As a member of the Human Rights Commission of Pakistan, he wrote letters to President Musharraf and different newspapers about Islamic attacks on Ahmadis. He also campaigned for the human rights of women, of Hindus, Christians, and liberal, secular Muslims. He also spoke about 1971 civil war and crimes against Bengalis. He also expressed disquiet and exposed the horrors of the Pakistan Army atrocities in Bengal in 1971, and the role of Islamism, mosques, mullahs and Islamic fundamentalists belonging to Jamaat-e-Islami and its students wing Islami Jamiiat Tulaba, and Al-Shamas, Al-Badar the Islamic extremists in Bengal mass murders. In response rumors were spread against him to put doubt about his mental balance: as for example, that he might be the son of the female prime minister of Pakistan's enemy country, India; that he might be an apostate and Ahmadi and so worthy of punishment and death. Among other activities he founded an organization The Enlightenment active for literacy, an organization associated with the International Humanist and Ethical Union, in 1990.

== Alleged blasphemy ==
Shaikh's blasphemy was alleged to have occurred at a lecture he gave on 2 October 2000 at Capital Medical College. The accusation was that he was an Ahmadi and talked about Islam and recited the Quran. That, during the lecture, Shaikh talked about Muhammad in a way Ahmadis are forbidden to.

Shaikh denied that this lecture even took place, and denied that he had said what was alleged. In a letter to Babu Gogineni of the IHEU, Shaikh offered an explanation of why a charge was made against him; he claimed (albeit without corroborating evidence against the people he accused):

1. On 1 October 2000 I attended a meeting of South Asian Union addressed by an ISI (Inter-Services Intelligence) Brigadier Shaukat Qadir (retired) also running a religious-political association of Jamait – I – Islami. I asked a couple of questions about South Asian peace and Kashmir which offended him and he returned a threat. There were foreign office policy makers and newsmen sitting there.

2. Within 48 hours, a foreign office employee who was also my student at the medical college where I used to lecture at the morning time, prepared an application against me, alleging blasphemous remarks in their class and gave it to a cleric, who improving upon the complaint, accused me of a specific instance of 2-10-2000 in the class of 11 2nd year male students and registered the case with the Police.

Shaukat Qadir denied that he had threatened Shaikh at the meeting. According to press reports, eleven students, all the students in Shaikh's class, signed a letter attesting to Shaikh's blasphemy. The cleric who received the letter was a member of an organisation known to harass and to attack non-orthodox Muslims. The reports call the organisation Aalmi Majlis Tahaffuz Khatm-e-Nubuwwat, which the press translates as the Committee for the Protection of the Finality of the Prophethood, or the Movement for the Finality of the Prophet, or the Organisation of the Finality of the Prophet. Pakistan said that Shaikh's accuser was the head of Majlis-e-Khatam-e-Nabuwwat. That organisation dispatched a mob to the medical school and to the police station, and threatened to burn them down if action was not urgently taken against Shaikh. Capital Homeopathic College, without explanation, suspended Shaikh on 3 October 2000.

== Trial ==
Section 295C of Pakistan's Penal Code says "whoever by the words, either spoken or written, or by visible representation, or by any imputation, innuendo, or insinuation, directly or indirectly, defiles the sacred name of the Holy Prophet Muhammad shall be punished with the death sentence or imprisonment for life and shall be liable to fine." A charge under Section 295C requires that the accused be kept in custody. Pursuant to Section 295C, the police arrested Shaikh on 4 October 2000. He was held in Adyala Gaol, Rawalpindi.

In August 2001, defended by a lawyer, Shaikh went to trial. The judgement was rendered at Adyala Jail, which was under vigil by armed Islamic zealots. On 18 August, the trial judge, Safdar Hussain, ordered the death penalty as well as a 100,000 rupee fine. The judge declared, "He deserves to be hanged for making derogatory remarks against the Prophet." Shaikh is the third Muslim to be sentenced to death under Pakistan's blasphemy laws.

The International Humanist and Ethical Union, Amnesty International, Mukto-Mona and Sea of Faith launched a campaign to win Shaikh's release. Demonstrations on his behalf occurred outside the Pakistani Embassies in London, Washington, and several other western capitals.

Shaikh appealed to the High Court. There the two presiding judges differed on whether the judgement should stand. On 15 July 2002, the case went to a senior judge. On 9 October 2003, the senior judge announced that the original judgement was unsound. He ordered a retrial.

The retrial was held over three sessions in November 2003. Shaikh did not use a lawyer to defend him because of threats to his lawyers by the extremist mullahs and the Pakistani Taliban. He defended himself after secretly studying law during his 3 years incarceration. On 21 November 2003, the trial judge acquitted Shaikh on legal grounds, and ordered that he be released. Commenting on the judgement, Shaikh explained: "The judge accepted my legal arguments and found the charges against me to be baseless. My accusers, two mullahs and some Islamist students, had lied while under the oath on the Holy Koran." He described his ordeal as: "Islamic terrorism through the abuse of law and of the state apparatus" No case was registered against the mullahs and Islamic witnesses who made false accusations and gave false evidence. He was not compensated for millions of dollars he lost in the trial either.

== See also ==
- Apostasy in Islam
- Blasphemy
- Blasphemy law in Pakistan
- List of former Muslims
