= Shuddhashar =

Bangladeshi publishing house

- Founded: 2004
- Headquarters: Norway

Shuddhashar is an exiled Bangladeshi publishing house currently based in Norway. Shuddhashar received the 2016 Jeri Laber International Freedom to Publish Award, given to publishers outside the United States who demonstrate courage despite restrictions on freedom of expression.

== History ==
Shuddhashar was founded as a literary and cultural magazine in 1990 before transforming into a publishing house in the early 2000s. It aims to provide a platform for progressive ideas and critical thinking and publishes books on a wide gamut of topics, including literature, art, culture, politics, social justice, women's rights, and LGBT rights. In 2013, Shuddhashar was awarded the Bangla Academy Shahid Munir Chowdhury Award. On 31 October 2015, assailants armed with guns and machetes stormed into the Shuddhashar office, intending to kill its publisher, Ahmedur Rashid Chowdhury; however, he survived despite sustaining injuries together with writer Randipam Basu, and blogger Tarek Rahim. Ansar Al Islam, an offshoot of Al-Qaeda in the Indian Sub-continent (AQIS), claimed responsibility for the attack. After his release from the hospital, Ahmedur was forced into exile with his family and eventually found refuge in Norway in February 2016. Shuddhashar resumed its operations as an online magazine and publication in 2017.
