= Political repression of cyber-dissidents =

Political persecution of people who voice dissent online

Political repression of cyber-dissidents is the oppression or persecution of people for expressing their political views on the Internet.

Along with development of the Internet, state authorities in many parts of the world carry out mass surveillance through electronic communications, establish Internet censorship to limit the flow of information, and persecute individuals and groups who express "inconvenient" political views in the Internet. Many cyber-dissidents have found themselves persecuted for attempts to bypass state controlled news media. Reporters Without Borders has released a Handbook For Bloggers and Cyber-Dissidents and has an updated edition (2008) here: https://ifap.ru/library/book414.pdf and maintains a roster of currently imprisoned cyber-dissidents.

== Iran ==
Mohamad Reza Nasab Abdolahi was imprisoned for publishing an open letter to Ayatollah Ali Khamenei. His pregnant wife and other bloggers who commented on the arrest were also imprisoned.

== Saudi Arabia ==
Raif Badawi, Saudi Arabian writer and activist and the creator of the website Free Saudi Liberals, has been convicted of crimes including "setting up a website that undermines general security" and "ridiculing Islamic religious figures." He was sentenced to seven years in prison and 600 lashes in 2013, then resentenced to 1000 lashes and ten years in prison plus a fine of 1 million riyal (equal to about $267,000). His wife, Ensaf Haidar, asserted that Raif will not be able to survive the flogging.

== Egypt ==
Several bloggers in Egypt have been arrested for allegedly defaming the president Hosni Mubarak or expressing critical views about Islam. Blogger Kareem Amer has been convicted to four years of prison.

== China ==
Chinese Communist Party general secretary Hu Jintao ordered to "maintain the initiative in opinion on the Internet and raise the level of guidance online," referring to censorship and ensuring online messages in China toe the party line. China is reported to have "an internet police force – reportedly numbering 30,000 – trawl[ing] websites and chat rooms, erasing anti-Communist comments and posting pro-government messages." However, the number of Internet police personnel was challenged by Chinese authorities. Amnesty International blamed several companies, including Google, Microsoft and Yahoo!, of collusion with the Chinese authorities to restrict access to information over the Internet and identify cyber-dissidents by hiring "big mamas".

It was reported that departments of provincial and municipal governments in mainland China began creating "teams of internet commentators, whose job is to guide discussion on public bulletin boards away from politically sensitive topics by posting opinions anonymously or under false names" in 2005. Applicants for the job were drawn mostly from the propaganda and police departments. Successful candidates have been offered classes in Marxism, propaganda techniques, and the Internet. "They are actually hiring staff to curse online," said Liu Di, a Chinese student who was arrested for posting her comments in blogs.

Foreign Ministry spokesperson Ma Zhaoxu objected to a question from foreign journalists regarding a cyber-dissident, stating that "there are no dissidents in China". Ai Weiwei believes that, by this statement, the government is effectively stating that: all dissidents are criminals, only criminals have dissenting views, anyone who believes China has dissidents is a criminal, and ultimately China does not have any dissidents because they are criminals.

== Russia ==
In 2006 journalist Vladimir Rakhmankov published an article on the Internet where he named Vladimir Putin "the nation's phallic symbol". A regional court found Rakhmankov guilty of offending Vladimir Putin and fined him to a sum of 20,000 roubles (~US$680).

In June 2013 a criminal case was opened on opposition blogger Stanislav Kalinichenko for retweeting a photograph of a leaflet reading "Enough demonstrating—it's time to act!" signed by a group calling itself the First Resistance Detachment and calling for the destruction of corrupt officials' property. Kalinichenko was charged with Criminal Code 280 ("calling publicly for extremist acts"), carrying a 4 years prison sentence. The human rights organization Memorial has characterized the charges as politically motivated.

In March 2014, on orders from the Attorney General, the government blocked the blog of opposition leader Alexei Navalny on the grounds that it disseminated extremism. In December 2015 Facebook complied with an order from the Attorney General to block Russian users' access to an event page by organizers of an unsanctioned rally in support of the Navalny brothers. All reposts of the event disappeared from users' walls. In addition, the supervisory body Roskomnadzor ordered a Ukrainian news website to delete a story about the protest.

In March 2014 historian Konstantin Zharinov was charged with advocating extremism, after using the "share with friends" VKontakte feature on a public appeal by the Ukrainian militant group Right Sector. Zharinov was placed under surveillance, and his participation in anti-war demonstrations and pickets in support of Alexei Navalny featured prominently in the investigation.

On 11 March 2022, Belarusian political police GUBOPiK arrested and detained editor of Russian Wikipedia from Minsk Mark Bernstein, who was editing the Wikipedia article about the Russian invasion of Ukraine, accusing him of the "spread of anti-Russian materials" and of violating Russian "fake news" law.

== Tunisia ==
Lawyer and human rights defender Mohammed Abbou was imprisoned for criticizing torture on a web site.

== Bangladesh ==
Asif Mohiuddin, a winner of The Bobs-Best of Online Activism award, was imprisoned by the Bangladesh government for posting "offensive comments about Islam and Mohammed". Deutsche Welle state "Asif's blog was one of the most read web pages in Bangladesh and is known for its strong criticism of religious fundamentalism and Bangladesh's 'anti-people politics'"

International organisations, including Human Rights Watch, Amnesty International, Reporters without Borders and the Committee to Protect Journalists have condemned the imprisonment of bloggers and the climate of fear for journalists.

The head of Reporters without Borders Asia-Pacific commented on the murder of writer Avijit Roy noting "It is unacceptable for [police] to spend so much time searching news outlets, arresting journalists, censoring news and investigating bloggers, when the many attacks on bloggers are still unpunished."

== Vietnam ==
Nguyen Vu Binh was imprisoned for writing about violations of human rights, and Truong Quoc Huy was arrested for discussing political reforms in an Internet chat room. Nguyen Vu Binh was released in June 2007.

== Pakistan ==
In January 2017, four bloggers known for their anti-religious and pro-democracy activism went missing. Altogether, their disappearances alarmed secular liberals involved in social activism in Pakistan.

== United States ==
Australian whistleblower, activist and founder of WikiLeaks, Julian Assange, became a dissident after publishing secret documents that he alleged proved American war crimes in Afghanistan and Iraq.

== See also ==
- Cyber-dissident
- Internet censorship
- Sociology of the Internet
- SORM, Russia's electronic surveillance program
