= Anu Muhammad =

Bangladeshi economist, public intellectual, writer, editor and political activist

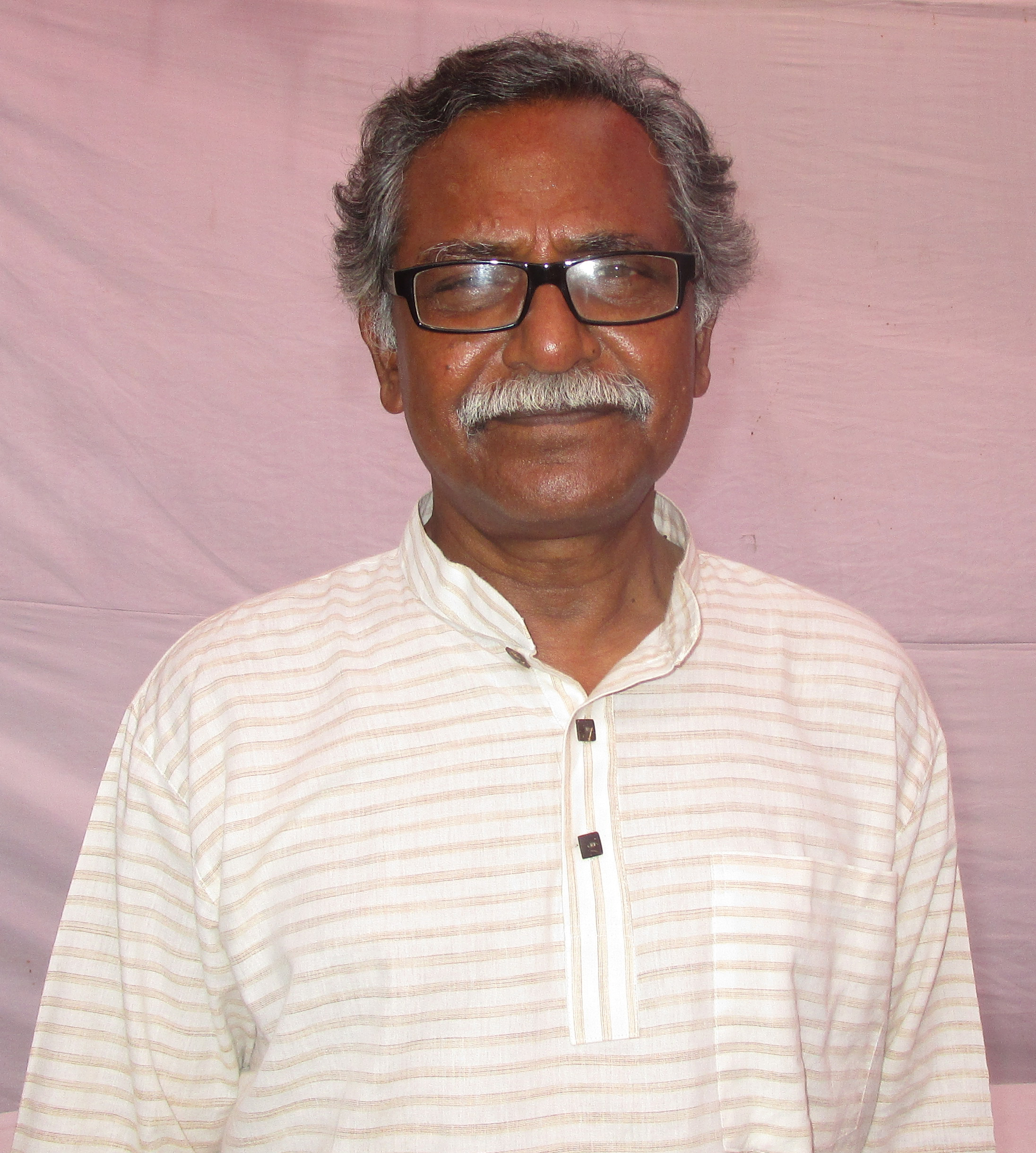
- Born: Anu Muhammad Anisur Rahman; 22 September 1956 (age 70); Jamalpur
- Spouse: Shilpi Barua

Academic background
- Education: Jahangirnagar University
- Influences: Marx, Lenin

Academic work
- Discipline: Political economy, anthropology, activism
- Institutions: Jahangirnagar University
- Website: www.anumuhammad.net; Information at IDEAS / RePEc

Anu Muhammad Anisur Rahman, better known as Anu Muhammad (Bengali: আনু মুহাম্মদ; born 22 September 1956), is an academic, economist, public intellectual, writer, editor, and political activist from Bangladesh. He was a professor of economics at Jahangirnagar University (1982-2022), he also taught anthropology (1991-2005) at the same university. He was a visiting scholar in Columbia University, US (1993) and Manitoba University, Canada (2001), taught at University of Winnipeg (2001).

Muhammad stands against class-gender-ethnic-religious discrimination, exploitation, environmental destruction, colonial domination, neo-liberal aggression in Bangladesh and elsewhere in the world. Beside performing academic responsibilities he has been working for social-political-cultural organizations and movements. He was the General Secretary for four terms of Bangladesh Lekhok Shibir, the leading writers organization at that time from 1984 to 1993. He was the elected general secretary for two terms of Jahangirnagar University Teachers Association (1986, 1987). He also played a key role in drafting 'policy against sexual harassment' in Jahangirnagar University following large anti-rape movement in 1998. That policy was the first document that helped make it a national policy.

Muhammad was the organizer of Committee to Protect Fundamental rights in Chottogram Hill tracts (1992–98). He was also involved in the movement against war criminals of 1971 since 1991. He organised peoples tribunal against the World Bank, International Monetary Fund (IMF) and Asian Development Bank (ADB) for their misdeeds in the name of development 'aid' in 2007.

Muhammad started work with the National Committee to Protect Oil Gas Mineral Resources, Port and Power (NCBD) in 1999 and led the broad alliance as member secretary from 2005 to 2021. During this period he led various movements to assert peoples ownership over their lives and resources and also to strengthen the peoples authority to bring environment friendly development for people. His writings and activism helped to build national movement against export of gas, anti-people contracts with multinationals and neo-liberal reform. He also led the movements against open pit mining in Phulbari by British-Australian company and Bangladesh-India joint Rampal coal-fired power plant on Sundarban. After peoples uprising against Phulbari coal project the then government was forced to sign an agreement with the people to cancel the project. On behalf of the people Anu Muhammad signed the agreement on 30 August 2006. He also opposed the coal power plants from China and Japan, and nuclear power plant from Russia in writings and in public protests.

Muhammad initiated research work with experts from home and abroad for getting better, cheaper and environment friendly alternative power system for Bangladesh. In the process he became the coordinator of an expert panel that prepared an 'alternative master plan for energy and power' solution for Bangladesh mostly based on renewable energy and national capability that was made public in 2017.

His public speeches, writings and his anti-establishment position led to many physical attacks and threat since 1995. He received death threats many times. He was seriously injured and hospitalized by the police attack in September 2009 during a demonstration protesting highly biased Production Sharing Contract (PSC) with US multinational oil companies. This event led to protests by different organizations and sections of the people in the country, a half day general strike was observed and an open letter condemned the event, signed by intellectuals, academics, and activists from around the world. He was arrested during a general strike he was leading in 2011. He received death threat for leading movement against Rampal Coal Fired Power Plant on Sundarbon.

Muhammad edited various journals and periodicals. He was the editor of Samaj biggan sameekkha, Social Science Journal (2016-2021) JU; Executive Editor,Sanskriti (1981-1999); Editor,Trinomul (1998-2000) and Natun Path (2002-2003); Editor,Meghbarta, first online journal (1998-2008). He is now Editor: Sarbojonkotha (Public Voices), a Bangla journal on socio economic issues, published quarterly since November 2014.

Muhammad has written several books, chapters in edited books and articles in Bangla and Englishon social-economic and political issues. Some of his articles were published in Monthly Review and Economic and Political Weekly. List of his published books is given below:

== Books ==
No	Name of the Book	Publisher	Publishing Year
1	Biswa Pujibad O Bangladesher Anunnayan (World Capitalism and Underdevelopment of Bangladesh)	Karim Prokashoni Songhoti Prokashoni -2nd Edition	1983 2007
2	Bangladesher Durbhikkho (Famine in Bangladesh) (Co Author: Atiur Rahman)	Papri Prokashoni	1984
3	Bangladesher Grameen Samaj O Arthaniti (Rural Society and Economy of Bangladesh)	Shahid Prokashoni Meera Prokashoni - 2nd Edition	1985 2000
4	Bangladeshi Unnayan Shankat ebang NGO Model (Crisis of Development and the NGO Model in Bangladesh)	Prochinta Prokashoni 2nd Edition 3rd Edition	1988 2000 2021
5	Bangladesher Kotipati, Madhyabitto O Sramik (Multimillionaires, Middle Class and Workers)	Chalantika Prokashoni Bangala Gobeshona - 2nd Edition	1992 2022
6	Anunnata Deshe Samajtanra: Sangram O Aviggata (Socialism in Underdeveloped Countries: Struggle and Experience)	Protik Prokashoni Songhoti Prokashoni -2nd Edition	1993 2019
7	Krantikaler Biswa-arthaniti ebang Unnoyan Samrajya (World Economy in transition and Development Empire)	Bostu Prokashon Meera Prokashoni -2nd Edition	1992 2001
8	Punjir Antarjatikikaran ebong Anunnata Biswa (Internationalization of Capital and Underdeveloped World)	Center for Social Studies, Dhaka University Srabon Prokashoni (2nd Edition)	1993 2006
9	Samaj, Samay ebong Manusher Larai (Society, Time and Struggle of Human-being)	Sondesh Prokashoni	1994
10	Dharma, Rashtra ebong Gonotantrik Andolon (Religion, State and Democratic Struggle)	Charbak Prokashoni	1994
11	Bangladesher Unnoyan ki Asamvab? (Is Development of Bangladesh impossible?)	Jatio Grantho Prokashon	1995
12	Columbuser America "Abishkar" O Bahujatik Manushera (Columbus's "Discovery" of America and Multinational faces)	Jatio Grantho Prokashon	1995
13	Nari, Purush O Samaj (Gender and Society)	Sondesh Prokashoni 2nd Edition Songhoti Prokashoni - 3rd Edition	1997 2005 2012
14	Rashtra O Rajniti: Bangladesher Dui Doshok (State and Politics: Two decades of Bangladesh)	Sondesh Prokashoni	2000
15	Bangladesher Arthinitir Chalchitra (Scanning Bangladesh Economy)	Shrabon Prokashoni	2000
16	Atonker Somaj Sontraser Arthiniti (Society of Fear Economy of Violence)	Meera Prokashon	2001
17	Arthasastrer Mulniti (Principles of Economics)	Bangladesh Open University	2001
18	Bangladesher Tel-Gas: Kar Ssompod Kar Bipod (Oil and Gas in Bangladesh: Whose Resource Whose Liability)	Jatio Grantho Prokashon	2002
19	Biswaner Boiporitya (Contrariety of Globalization)	Shrabon Prokashoni 2nd Edition Songhoti Prokashoni - 3rd Edition	2003 2007 2021
20	Bangladesher Arthinir Gotimukh (Direction Of Bangladesh Economy)	Shrabon Prokashoni Bangala Gobeshona - 2nd Edition	2005 2022
21	Manusher Somaj (Human Society)	Roudro Prokashoni Songhoti Prokashoni - 2nd Edition	2005 2010
22	Unnoyoner Rajniti (Politics of Development)	Suchipotro	2006
23	Biplober Swapnabhumi Cuba pujibadi Biswayane Latin America (Cuba the dreamland of Revolution and Latin America in Globalized Capitalism)	Shrabon Prokashoni 2nd Edition Songhoti Prokashoni - Songhoti Edition	2007 2010 2017
24	Phulbari Kansat Garments 2006	Shrabon Prokashoni	2007
25	Kothai Jachche Bangladesh (Where Bangladesh is heading to)	Songhoti Prokashoni	2008
26	Arokkhito Desh Arokkhito Manush (Unprotected country unprotected people)	Adorn Prokashoni	2009
27	Elias O Proshner Shokti (Elias and the power of question)	Shrabon Prokashoni Gronthik Prokashon -2nd Expanded Edition	2009 2022
28	Development or Destruction, Essays on Global Hegemony, Corporate Grabbing and Bangladesh	Shrabon Prokashoni	2007
29	Anu Muhammader Sakkhatkar (Interview of Anu Muhammad)	Rodela Prokashoni	2010
30	Pujir antorgoto probonota: Manush, Sompod, Prokriti (Inherent trends and crisis of Capital: People, Wealth, Nature)	Songhoti Prokashoni	2010
31	Arthastra Porichoi (Introduction to Economics)	Songhoti Prokashoni	2010
32	Samorik Shasoner Doshoke (In the decade of military regime)	Noborag Prokashoni	2011
33	Sottor Doshoke (In the decade of Seventies)	Ekushe Prokashoni	2009
34	Bangladeshe Shilpodyokta (Entrepreneurs in Bangladesh)	Catharsis Publishing	2008
35	Eshwar Puji O Manush (God, Capital and People)	Mowla Brathers	2014
36	Bangladesher Muktijuddho, Samrajyabad O Bharatproshno (The Liberation War of Bangladesh, Imperialism and The Question of India)	Noborag Prokashoni	2014
37	Amra 99% (We are 99%)	Manushjon Prokashoni	2015
38	'Santrasbirodhi Juddho: Afghanistan, Iraq, Bangladesh (War on Terror: Afghanistan, Iraq, Bangladesh)	Aloghor Prokashona	2016
39	Unnoyoner Boiporityo (Contrariety of Development)	Mowla Brathers	2018
40	Pran Prakriti Bangladesh (Life nature Bangladesh)	Mowla Brathers	2019
41	Rashtra ache Rashtra nai (State exists, State does not exist)	Songhoti Prokashoni	2019
42	Hugo Chávez Sahe Venezuelar Golpo The story of Venezuela with Hugo Chávez	Songhoti Prokashoni	2020
43	Development Re-examined: Construction and Consequences of Neo- liberal Bangladesh	UPL	2020
44	Coronakale Bangladesh (Bangladesh during COVID-19)	Songhoti Prokashoni	2021
45	Chin: Porashoktir Biborton (China: The Evolution of a Superpower)	BizBangla Media Limited	2023
