= Ajoy Roy =

Bangladeshi academic

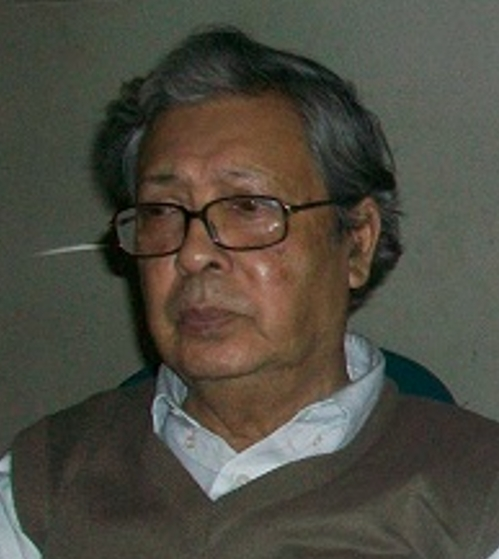
- Born: 1 March 1935; Dinajpur, British India
- Died: 9 December 2019 (aged 84); Dhaka, Bangladesh
- Education: University of Dhaka (BSc, MSc); Leeds University (PhD)
- Spouse: Shefali Roy
- Children: 2, including Avijit Roy

Ajoy Roy (1 March 1935 – 9 December 2019) was a Bangladeshi professor of physics at the University of Dhaka, but was best known for his prominent role in Bangladesh's human rights activism and freethinking. He was one of the eminent educationists promoting secular humanism in Bangladesh.

He was the founder and president of the Shishka Andolan Mancha (Platform For Education-Movement) and chairman of Shamriti Mancha (Platform for peace-harmony-tranquility).

Roy was editor in chief of Muktanwesa (Bengali: মুক্তান্বেষা) magazine, a Bengali publication for promoting freethinking and secular humanism. He was also the member of advisory board of the Mukto-Mona, an internet forum of freethinkers, rationalists, sceptics, atheists and humanists of mainly Bengali and South Asian descent. He was an honorary associate of the Rationalist International, an organisation that defends rationalist ideas. He contributed as a columnist to the national newspapers of Bangladesh. In 2012, he received Ekushey Padak, the second highest civilian award of Bangladesh.

== Early years and education ==
Roy was born in Dinajpur, Bangladesh. He received his bachelor's degree and master's degree from Dhaka University, and took his Doctor of Philosophy degree in physical chemistry from Leeds University of England. He was among a group of teachers who formed an advanced centre of solid state physics and crystallography established in 1969 under the sponsorship of UNESCO. His work led to the discovery of some fundamental processes in radiation chemistry of aliphatic and amino acids and their salts. The process of dissociative electron capture and the subsequent fate of electron is considered to be his major contribution as a scientist. His scientific works have also been cited in the contents of volumes (1–50) of Progress in NMR Spectroscopy.

== Human rights activism ==
Roy participated in many progressive movements in Bangladesh including Language movement of 1952, Mass Movement in 1969, and Non Co-operation movement of 1970 and most prominently, in the Bangladesh Liberation War in 1971 as a freedom fighter. He was one of the teachers of Dhaka University who were directly involved with the liberation war of Bangladesh in 1971, paramilitary as a member of Mukti Bahini (or liberation army) involving in guerrilla warfare in Comilla border to fight against the West Pakistani army. Later he became a member of the Planning Commission to the Government of Bangladesh during the liberation war and worked as a general secretary of East Pakistan Teachers' association in Kolkata. He also established several cultural organisations to inspire the freedom fighters where Mamunur Rashid and other noted actors took active part. After Liberation Prof. Roy was the general secretary of the Asiatic Society of Bangladesh in the 1972–73 period, succeeding Ahmed Sharif.

When Pakistani freethinker Dr. Younus Shaikh was in prison and awaiting the death penalty for alleged blasphemous remarks regarding Muhammad in 2000, Ajoy Roy organised the 'Save Dr. Yunus Shaikh Committee' and held meetings, processions, seminars, road side demonstration and staged demonstration against Pakistani president General Pervez Musharraf in front of the Pakistan High commission at Dhaka.

Following the 2001 general elections, there was a wave of violence and oppression towards the minority Hindu community, Ajoy Roy took active stand to help the victims. He also created control and monitoring cell at Dhaka before the election of 2008 to prevent similar atrocities on minority population of Bangladesh. He also worked for the rights of the indigenous and hill people of Bangladesh.

== Freethinking and secular humanism ==
Roy translated the first chapter of Richard Dawkins' The God Delusion into Bengali and took active role to introduce Aroj Ali Matubbar, the rationalist, peasant-philosopher of Bangladesh in the west. He defended Taslima Nasrin and her plight in various essays. He worked to build up a science-based culture for rapid development of the country. He was also one of the pioneers to organise Darwin Day rally at Dhaka. He received criticism for endorsing anti-Islamic activities referenced in Shah Ahmad Shafi's open letter named An Open Letter from Shah Ahmad Shafi to the Government and the Public related to the Shahbag protests in 2013.

His son Avijit Roy, an engineer who blogged about secular humanism, was hacked to death in Dhaka on 26 February 2015.

== Death ==
Roy died on 9 December 2019 at the age of 84.

== Recognition and awards ==
- Ekushey Padak (2012),
- Bangla Academy Literary Award (2011),
- Asiatic Society Fellowship Award (2009)
- Bangla Academy Fellowship Award (2008)
- Jahanara Imam Memorial Award (2007)

== Books ==
- Biggan O Darshan: Jor er Shondhane (Science and Philosophy: The Quest for Matter) (1993–94)
- Adi Bangali : Nritattik O shomajtattik Bishleshon (The Ancient Bengali) (1997) [Nominated as the best book of the year from Itihash Parishad]
- Swatantra Bhabna (Independent Thought) (2008)
- Biswash O Biggan (Belief and Science) (2012)
- Rabindranath O Upanishad (2012)
- Leela Nag: Shoto Borsher Sroddhanjoli (Leela Nag – A Tribute) (2003)
- Podartho Bidya: Resnick/Halliday (co-translation of Fundamentals of Physics by Resnick/Halliday)
- Bangla Academy Biggan Kosh (Bangla Academy Science Encyclopedia)
