= Bonya Ahmed =

American-Bangladeshi blogger and activist

- বন্যা আহমেদ
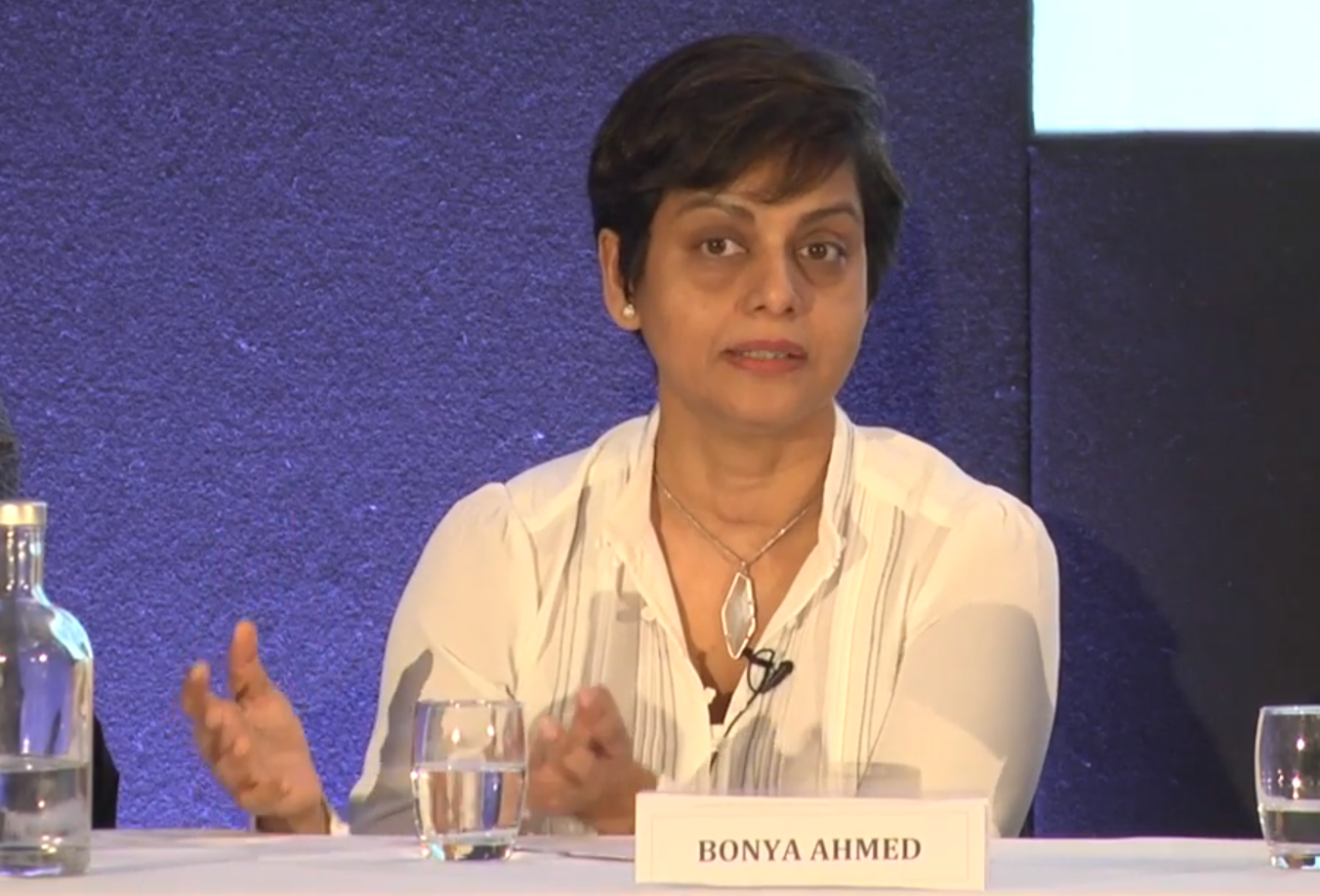
- Bonya Ahmed speaking at the Secular Conference 2018.
- Born: Rafida Bonya Ahmed; 1969 (age 56–57); Dhaka, East Pakistan
- Education: Minnesota State University, Mankato
- Spouse: Avijit Roy

Rafida Bonya Ahmed (also known as Bonya Ahmed and Rafida Ahmed; born 1969) is a Bangladeshi-American who is a writer, blogger, and humanitarian activist. In 2020, she founded the educational channels Think Bangla and Think English on YouTube. Along with her husband Avijit Roy, she was attacked and badly wounded by machete-wielding Islamic extremists at the Ekushey Book Fair in Dhaka, Bangladesh in 2015, and Roy was killed.

== Biography ==
Ahmed was born in Dhaka, Bangladesh. She completed her undergraduate degree in computer information science from Minnesota State University, Mankato.

Ahmed met her husband, Avijit Roy, through their writing on Mukto-Mona, the first online platform for Bengali speaking freethinkers, atheists, and secular bloggers and writers founded by Avijit. This group started the first celebration of Darwin Day in Bangladesh. Mukto-Mona was internationally recognised in 2015 and received The BOBS jury award. Ahmed wrote Bibortoner Path Dhore ("Along the Evolutionary Path", 2007). She is one of the moderators of Mukto-Mona.

Ahmed speaking at the 2017 International Conference on Free Expression and Conscience London

Ahmed has a daughter, Trisha Ahmed, from her first marriage. Trisha wrote an article with her stepfather Avijit for the Free Inquiry magazine about imprisoned secularist bloggers. Ahmed was diagnosed with thyroid cancer in 2011 and went into remission after extensive treatment.

On 26 February 2015, Ahmed and Roy were attacked by machete-wielding Islamic extremists while they were visiting Dhaka on a book signing trip. They were attacked in the middle of the street at a very crowded book fair. Roy died after he was taken to the hospital and Ahmed was gravely injured.

Ahmed decided to take a leave of absence from her job as a senior director at a credit bureau in the US after the attack. She started working with the humanist associations in Europe and the US to raise awareness about the attacks on the secular intellectuals in Bangladesh by Islamic fundamentalists, and in July that year gave the British Humanist Association's Voltaire Lecture.

She is currently doing research work on Islamic fundamentalism as a visiting research scholar at University of Texas at Austin. She received the Freedom From Religion Foundation's "Forward" award in 2016. She is a member of the jury of Deutsche Welle's The BOBS Best of Online Activism Award.

External videos
- Simple narratives can be deadly: how I recovered from a terror attack | Bonya Ahmed | TEDxExeter. Retrieved 27 September 2019.

On 20 April 2018, Ahmed gave a TEDx Talk in Exeter, explaining how she recovered from the 2015 terrorist attack that left her husband dead and herself physically and emotionally scarred for life.

In 2019, Bonya Ahmed co-founded Think, a charity that creates Bangla and English educational videos with more languages to come in the future. Think's goal is to spread scientific knowledge and humanist values all around the world.

== Works and activism ==
- Bibortoner Path Dhore ("Along the Evolutionary Path"), 2007, Abosor Prakashani, Dhaka.
- "Fighting Machetes with Pens", Voltaire Lecture 2015.
- Bonya Ahmed on the UN panel "Ending Impunity for Crimes against Journalists".
- Tom Lantos Human Rights Commission Briefing on Human Rights in Bangladesh.
- Talk at Harvard Humanist Hub.
- Keynote address at Reason Rally 2016.
- Talk at American Humanist Association Annual Conference 2016.
- Lecture in the 4th Women in Secularism Conference 2016.
