= Ahmedur Rashid Chowdhury =

Publisher and writer (born 1973)

Ahmedur Chowdhury
- আহমেদুর চৌধুরী
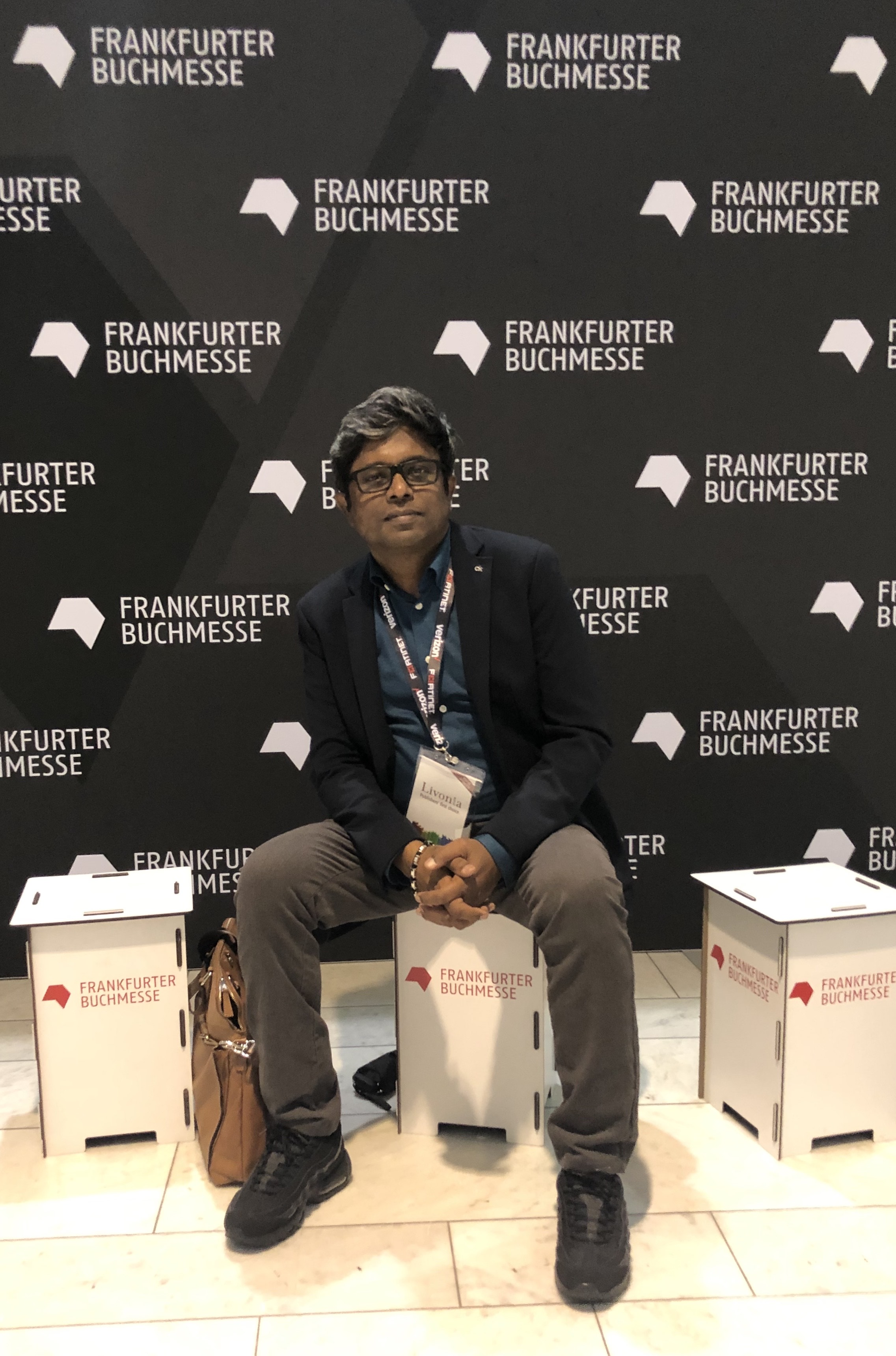
- Born: March 28, 1973 (age 53); Sunamganj, Bangladesh
- Other name: Tutul
- Occupations: Editor, publisher
- Employer(s): Shuddhashar, steeringARC
- Awards: PEN Pinter Prize 2016, Ossietzky Prize 2018
- Website: https://ahmedurtchowdhury.com

Ahmedur Chowdhury (Bengali: আহমেদুর চৌধুরী, also Tutul টুটুল) is a Bangladeshi publisher and writer. He won the 2016 Pinter International Writer of Courage Award, selected by writer Margaret Atwood, The Jeri Laber International Freedom to Publish Award, 2016 and the Ossietzky Prize in 2018. His writings were published in newspapers, magazine, and blogs.

== Career ==
In 1990, Chowdhury founded Shuddhashar magazine. He established a publishing house, under the same name, in Dhaka in 2004. Shuddhashar won Shahid Munir Chowdhury Award by the Bangla Academy in 2013. In February 2015, he received a death threat, for publishing materials of atheist writers.

On October 31, 2015, he was attacked by assailants with machetes. He was hospitalized in a critical condition. Ansar Al Islam (AQIS Bangladesh) claimed the responsibility. He went into exile and settled in Norway in January 2016. when he was invited as a guest writer by the International Cities of Refuge Network and Norwegian authorities. Now he is editing his online magazine Shuddhashar. Shuddhashar's primary mission is to publish work at the intersection of politics, free speech, activism, and literature. It is a platform to inspire writers and activists, especially those at risk or in exile, by providing an opportunity to expose their work and contribute to social and political change through the exchange of ideas.

In 2016, Shuddhashar Magazine was awarded with the PEN Pinter International Writer of Courage Award. Chowdhury was the finalist of 2016 IPA Freedom to Publish Prize and International Publishers Association, Prix Voltaire Short List, 2018. In 2017 he gave an "inspiring" presentation at the Oslo Freedom Forum.

== Works ==
- Editor Shuddhashar
- Publisher Shuddhashar
- Nil Bishe Sish Kate Thot (Whistling through Blue Poison) (1995)
