= Somewhereinblog.net =

Bengali blogging web site

Somewhere in... blog

- Website type: Blog
- Area served: Bengali community worldwide
- Owner: somewherein.net limited
- Website: somewhereinblog.net
- Commercial: Yes
- Registration: Optional

Somewhere in... blog (also known as Samu) is a Bengali blogging website. বাঁধ ভাঙার আওয়াজ or Voice of breaking obstacle is the slogan of the blog. It is the first public blogging site in Bengali established in 2005 and the largest community of Bengali bloggers in the world. It provides free blog posting for registered users. Registration is optional to read on blogs hosted on the site. Registration is required to post in or to comment on the post. Somewhere in blog was banned for eight months.

== Founders ==
Syeda Gulshan Ferdous Jana and her husband Arild Klokkerhaug are the founder of the blog. She is the editor of Somewhere in... blog. Site's programmer Hasin Hayder developed a Bengali phonetic keyboard which is the first tool to write in Bengali using an English keyboard. There were over 175 thousands individual registered bloggers with the site as of November, 2014 and 250 thousands in 2019. The number of active bloggers are over 10,000.

== Activities ==
Somewherein Blog welcomes articles from a wide variety of topics. From book reviews to fitness to politics to travel to tech to patriotism to traveling. The organisation also have worked actively on the following, amongst many:

- Want trial of war criminals
- Protest for justice of Murder of Sagar Sarowar and Meherun Runi
- Celebration of Bengali Blog Day (19 December)

== Temporary ban by the government ==
The blog gained controversy when Shah Ahmad Shafi, in an open letter, accused it of hosting allegedly anti-Islamic content and called on the government to take action. Between 6 and 19 February 2019, the Bangladesh Telecommunication Regulatory Commission (BTRC) took down nearly 20,000 sites in a war against pornography, gambling and other 'obscene contents'. Somewherein Blog was one of the sites in this wholesale blocking.

With over 213,000 registered bloggers at that time, the blog always promoted liberal views. While the platform was listed for blocking for allegedly displaying pornographic content, the post and telecommunications minister also blamed the site for spreading atheism in Bangladesh. "Somewhereinblog was a very controversial platform. Its content was not only anti-government, but also scandalous. They were also responsible for spreading atheism in the country," The-then Minister of Post and Telecommunication, Mustafa Jabbar, told Deutsche Welle.

Eventually, after being blocked for over 8 months, the site was 'unblocked' by the authorities in October 2019.

== Moderation ==
For bloggers of this site, there are four types of moderation status. They are safe, general, watch, and blocked. Moderators of this blog are also known as Modu. As of now, the present moderator of Somewherein Blog (সামহোয়্যারইন ব্লগ) is Mozaddid Al Fasani Jadid . His blog name is কাল্পনিক_ভালোবাসা, and he has been serving as a moderator since November 2014. Post syndications are fully controlled by Moderators and Administrators.

== See also ==
- Bangladesh Telecommunication Regulatory Commission
