= Qayyum Chowdhury =

Bangladeshi painter (1932–2014)

- কাইয়ুম চৌধুরী
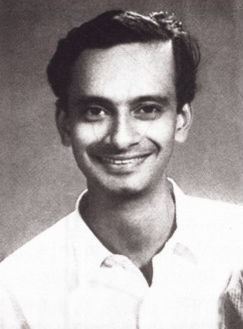
- Chowdhury in 1960
- Born: 9 March 1932; Feni, Bengal Presidency, British India
- Died: 30 November 2014 (aged 82); Dhaka, Bangladesh
- Known for: Painting, book design and illustration
- Awards: Ekushey Padak (1984)

Qayyum Chowdhury (9 March 1932 – 30 November 2014) was a Bangladeshi painter. Along with Zainul Abedin, Quamrul Hassan and Safiuddin Ahmed, he is considered as a first generation artist of Bangladesh. He was awarded the Ekushey Padak in 1984 and the Independence Day Award in 2014 by the Government of Bangladesh.

== Early life ==
Chowdhury was born on 9 March 1932 in Feni. His father, Abdul Quddus Chowdhury, came from a landlord family and was a cooperative-bank official. Because of transferring job, Chowdhury lived in Chittagong, Comilla, Narail, Sandwip, Noakhali, Feni, Faridpur and Mymensingh in his boyhood. His uncles, Mohtasambillah Chowdhury and Aminul Islam Chowdhury were writers. In 1949, he completed his matriculation from Mymensingh City Collegiate School. He graduated from Dhaka Art College (now Faculty of Fine Arts, University of Dhaka) in 1954.

== Career ==
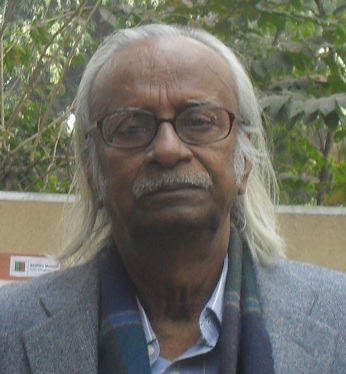
Chowdhury in 2011

Chowdhury joined Dhaka Art College as a lecturer in 1957. He then took a job at the newly established Design Centre to work under Quamrul Hassan. Within a year he joined the then Pakistan Observer where he served as the chief artist. He also started working for the Observer group's other publications namely Chitrali, a cine magazine and Purbadesh, a news magazine. He went back to Dhaka Art College in 1965. He was promoted to the position of assistant professor in 1970, to associate professor in 1986 and to professor in 1991. He retired from the organization in 1994 but he kept teaching in the institute until 2002.

== Works ==
Chowdhury's early work include My Sister (oil painting, 1954), Pawnbroker (oil painting, 1956), Boat in Moonlight (watercolor, 1956) and Self-portrait (oil painting, 1959). His later work were Boat (pen and ink, 2001), Setting Sun (pen and ink, 2001), Secret Talk (acrylic, 2004) and Worried (acrylic, 2004). He held four solo exhibitions.

Chowdhury began designing book covers by working on Zahir Raihan's book Shesh Bikeler Meye. He designed the cover of Shamsur Rahman (poet)'s first poetry collection, Prothom Gaan Dwityo Mrittyur Agey, and several books of Syed Shamsul Haque.

Chowdhury was a member of Bangladesh Bank's currency note design committee and mural committee and designed several currency notes in circulation.

Chowdhury had been involved with daily Prothom Alo since its inception in 1998. He was the convenor of the Charu Karu Shilpi Songram Parishad during the liberation war in 1971.

== Awards ==
- First prize for Painting, National Art Exhibition in Lahore (1961)
- The Imperial Court Prize, Tehran Biennale (1966)
- Gold medal for book design from the National Book Centre, Dhaka (1975)
- Shilpakala Academy Award (1977)
- Ekushey Padak (1984)
- 6th Bangabandhu Award (1994)
- Leipzig Book Fair Prize for book illustration (1983)
- Sultan Padak (1999)

== Personal life and death ==
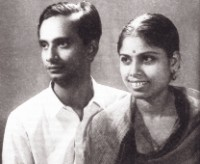
Chowdhury with his wife

In 1960, Chowdhury married Tahera Khanum, (1935–2021) an artist who was one of the first four girls to get admitted to the Art College in 1954. Together they had a son Moinul Islam Zaber.

On 30 November 2014, Chowdhury fell sick while delivering his speech on the fourth-day of Bengal Foundation organized classical music festival in Bangladesh Army Stadium. He had been taken to Combined Military Hospital, where he was declared dead.

== Documentary on Qayyum Chowdhury ==
A documentary film on the life and work of Qayyum Chowdhury was directed and scripted by Fahmida Akhter (as "Fahmida Munni") in 2004 entitled "Nishorger Ankiey" (2004, Ode to Nature : Portrait of an Artist), produced by Bengal Foundation. ,
