= Mukto-Mona =

Bengali atheist blog

- Website type: blog
- Available in: Bengali
- Website: home.muktomona.com mukto-mona.com

Mukto-Mona (Bengali: মুক্ত-মনা lit. 'Free-thinker') is a Bengali language blog for secularists, atheists, and freethinkers. It was founded by Avijit Roy who was subsequently killed by militants in Dhaka, Bangladesh. The attackers are believed to be members of Ansarullah Bangla Team.

== History ==
Mukto-Mona, meaning freethinkers in Bengali, was founded by Bangladeshi-American secular blogger Avijit Roy, who was based in Atlanta, United States. He created a Yahoo group titled Mukto-Mona 26 May 2001 which he made into a website next year. The blog gained controversy when Shah Ahmad Shafi, in an open letter, accused it of hosting allegedly anti-Islamic content and called on the government to take action. Avijit was killed in February 2015 in Dhaka, Bangladesh by militants. His wife, Rafida Ahmed Bonya was injured in the attack. Bonya took over the management of the blog after the death of her husband. The blog was awarded The Bobs – Best of Online Activism award by Deutsche Welle in June 2015. A number of atheist bloggers associated with Muto-Mona have been targeted and killed by Islamists in Bangladesh.

== See also ==
- Islam Online
- Imams Online
- Jamuna Television
