= Humayun Azad bibliography =

- Poetry↙: 10
- Fiction↙: 15
- Books of essays↙: 21
- Linguistics↙: 7
- Teenage literature↙: 7
- Others↙: 5

This bibliography contains a list of works by Bangladeshi poet, novelist Humayun Azad.

== Poetry ==
The following is a list of books of poetry by Humayun Azad arranged chronologically by first edition.

No.	Title	Title Original	Year	Remarks	Ref
1	"Alaukik Istimar"	অলৌকিক ইষ্টিমার	1973	ISBN 9789840419302	
2	"Jolo Chitabagh"	জ্বলো চিতাবাঘ	1980	ISBN 9789840418923	
3	"Shob Kichu Noshtoder Odhikare Jabe"	সব কিছু নষ্টদের অধিকারে যাবে	1985	ISBN 9789840417049	
4	"Jotoi Gobhire Jai Modhu Jotoi Uporay Jai Neel"	যতোই গভীরে যাই মধু যতোই ওপরে যাই নীল	1987	ISBN 9789840416967	
5	"Ami Bachay Chilam Onnoder Shomoy"	আমি বেঁচেছিলাম অন্যদের সময়ে	1990	ISBN 9789844018006	
6	"Humayun Azader Shreshtho Kobita"	হুমায়ূন আজাদের শ্রেষ্ঠ কবিতা	1993	ISBN 9789844011090	
7	"Adhunik Bangla Kobita"	আধুনিক বাঙলা কবিতা	1994		
8	"Kafone Mora Osrubindu"	কাফনে মোড়া অশ্রুবিন্দু	1998	ISBN 9789840418381	
9	"Kabya Shonggroho"	কাব্য সংগ্রহ	1998	ISBN 9789840415021	
10	"Peronor Kichhu Nei"	পেরোনোর কিছু নেই	2004	ISBN 9844017742	

== Fictions ==
The following is a list of fiction books by Humayun Azad arranged chronologically by first edition.

No.	Title	Title Translation	Title Original	Year	Remarks	Ref
1	"Chhappanno Hajar Borgomail"	Fifty Six Thousand Square Miles	ছাপ্পান্নো হাজার বর্গমাইল	1994	ISBN 978-9840417179	OCLC 60043495
2	"Sab Kichu Bhene Pare"	Things Fall Apart	সব কিছু ভেঙে পড়ে	1995	ISBN 978-984-401-264-6	OCLC 32891823
3	"Manush Hishebe Aamar Oporadhshomuho"	My Crimes as a Human	মানুষ হিসেবে আমার অপরাধসমূহ	1996	ISBN 9789840421404	
4	"Jadukorer Mrittu"	Death of the Magician	যাদুকরের মৃত্যু	1996	ISBN 984-401-327-5	
5	"Shuvobroto, Tar Shomporkito Shushomacher"	Shuvobroto, and His Gospel	শুভব্রত, তার সম্পর্কিত সুসমাচার	1997	ISBN 978-984-04-1271-6	
6	"Rajnitibidgon"	The politicians	রাজনীতিবিদগণ	1998	ISBN 9789844014671	
7	"Kobi Othoba Dondito Aupurush"	Then poet or the condemned eunuch	কবি অথবা দন্ডিত অপুরুষ	1999	ISBN 978-984-04-2141-1	
8	"Nijer Shonge Nijer Jiboner Modhu"	The honey of one's life with himself	নিজের সঙ্গে নিজের জীবনের মধু	2000	ISBN 978-984-04-1697-4	
9	"Fali Fali Kore Kata Chand"	The split moon	ফালি ফালি ক'রে কাটা চাঁদ	2001		
10	"Uponnashshonggroho-Ak"		উপন্যাসসংগ্রহ-১ (Collection of Novels, Vol.1)	2001		
11	"Sraboner Brishtite Roktojoba"	Rose mallow in monsoon	শ্রাবণের বৃষ্টিতে রক্তজবা	2002	ISBN 9789840416684	
12	"Uponnashshonggroho-Dui"		উপন্যাসসংগ্রহ-২ (Collection of Novels, Vol.2)	2002		
13	"Dosh Hazar Abong Aro Akti Dhorshon"	10,000, And ! More Rape	১০,০০০, এবং আরো একটি ধর্ষণ	2003	ISBN 978-984-40-1731-3	
14	"Pak Sar Jamin Sad Bad"		পাক সার জমিন সাদ বাদ	2004	ISBN 984-401-769-6	OCLC 808109497
15	"Ekti Khuner Svapna"	Dreaming of a Murder	একটি খুনের স্বপ্ন	2004		OCLC 416330654

== Books of essays ==
No.	Title	Title Original	Year	Remarks	Ref
1	"Rabindraprobondho/Rashtro O Shomajchinta"	রবীন্দ্র প্রবন্ধ/রাষ্ট্র ও সমাজচিন্তা	1973		
2	"Shamsur Rahman/Nishshonggo Sherpa"	শামসুর রাহমান/নিঃসঙ্গ শেরপা	1983		
3	"Shilpokolar Bimanikikoron O Onnanno Probondho"	শিল্পকলার বিমানবিকীকরণ ও অন্যান্য প্রবন্ধ	1988		
4	"Bhasha-Andolon:Shahittik Potobhumi"	ভাষা-আন্দোলন: সাহিত্যিক পটভূমি	1990		
5	"Naree"	নারী	1992	banned between 19 November 1995 and 7 March 2000	
6	"Protikkriashilotar Dirgho Chayar Niche"	প্রতিক্রিয়াশীলতার দীর্ঘ ছায়ার নিচে	1992		
7	"Nibir Nilima"	নিবিড় নীলিমা	1992		
8	"Matal Torony"	মাতাল তরণী	1992		
9	"Norokay Anonto Hritu"	নরকে অনন্ত ঋতু	1992		
10	"Jolpai Ronger Andhokar"	জলপাই রঙের অন্ধকার	1992		
11	"Shimaboddhotar Shutro"	সীমাবদ্ধতার সূত্র	1993		
12	"Adhar O Adhayo"	আধার ও আধেয়	1993		
13	"Amar Abishshash"	আমার অবিশ্বাস	1997		
14	"Parbotto Chattagram: Shobuj Paharer Bhetor Diye Probahito Hingshar Jhornadhara"	পার্বত্য চট্টগ্রাম: সবুজ পাহাড়ের ভেতর দিয়ে প্রবাহিত হিংসার ঝরনাধারা	1997		
15	"Nirbachito Probondho"	নির্বাচিত প্রবন্ধ	1999		
16	"Mohabishsho"	মহাবিশ্ব	2000		
17	"Ditio Lingo"	দ্বিতীয় লিঙ্গ	2001	translation of The Second Sex by Simone de Beauvoir	
18	"Amra Ki Ai Bangladesh Cheyechilam"	আমরা কি এই বাঙলাদেশ চেয়েছিলাম	2003		
19	"Dhormanuvutir Upokotha"	ধর্মানভূতির উপকথা ও অন্যান্য	2004		
20	"Amar Notun Jonmo"	আমার নতুন জন্ম	2005	ISBN 984-401-839-0	
21	"Amader Boimela"	আমাদের বইমেলা	2006		

== Linguistics ==
No.	Title	Title Original	Year	Remarks	Ref
1	"Pronominalization in Bengali"		1983		
2	"Bangla Bhashar Shotrumitro"	বাঙলা ভাষার শত্রুমিত্র	1983		
3	"Bakkototto"	বাক্যতত্ত্ব	1994		
4	"Bangla Bhasha" (Vol.1)	বাঙলা ভাষা (দ্বিতীয় খন্ড)	1985		
5	"Bangla Bhasha" (Vol.2)	বাক্যতত্ত্ব	1994		
6	"Tulonamulok O Oitihashik Bhashabiggan"	তুলনামূলক ও ঐতিহাসিক ভাষাবিজ্ঞান	1988		
7	"Arthobiggan"	অর্থবিজ্ঞান	1999		

== Teenage literature ==
No.	Title	Title Original	Year	Remarks	Ref
1	"Lal Neel Dipaboli Ba Bangla Shahitter Jiboni"	লাল নীল দীপাবলি বা বাঙলা সাহিত্যের জীবনী	1976		
2	"Fuler Gondhe Ghum Ashena"	ফুলের গন্ধে ঘুম আসেনা	1985		
3	"Koto Nodi Shorobor Ba Bangla Bhashar Jiboni"	কতো নদী সরোবর বা বাঙলা ভাষার জীবনী	1987	ISBN 984-401-017-9	
3	"Abbuke Mone Pore"	আব্বুকে মনে পড়ে	1989	ISBN 984-401-555-3	
4	"Bukpokete Jonakipoka"	বুকপকেটে জোনাকিপোকা	1993	ISBN 9789840416646	
5	"Amader Shohoray Akdol Debdut"	আমাদের শহরে একদল দেবদূত	1996		
6	"Andhokaray Gondhoraj"	অন্ধকারে গন্ধরাজ	2003		
7	"Our Beautiful Bangladesh"		2004		

== Others ==
No.	Title	Title Original	Year	Remarks	Ref
1	"Humayun Azader Probochonguccho"	হুমায়ুন আজাদের প্রবচনগুচ্ছ	1992		
2	"Shakkhatkar"	সাক্ষাৎকার	1994		
3	"Attotayider Shonge Kothopokothon"	আততায়ীদের সঙ্গে কথোপকথন	1995		
4	"Bohumatrik Jotirmoy"	বহুমাত্রিক জ্যোতির্ময়	1997		
5	"Rabindranath Thakurer Prothom Kobita"	রবীন্দ্রনাথ ঠাকুরের প্রধান কবিতা	1997		
