= Bengali novels =

Bengali-language novels

Bengali literature বাংলা সাহিত্য
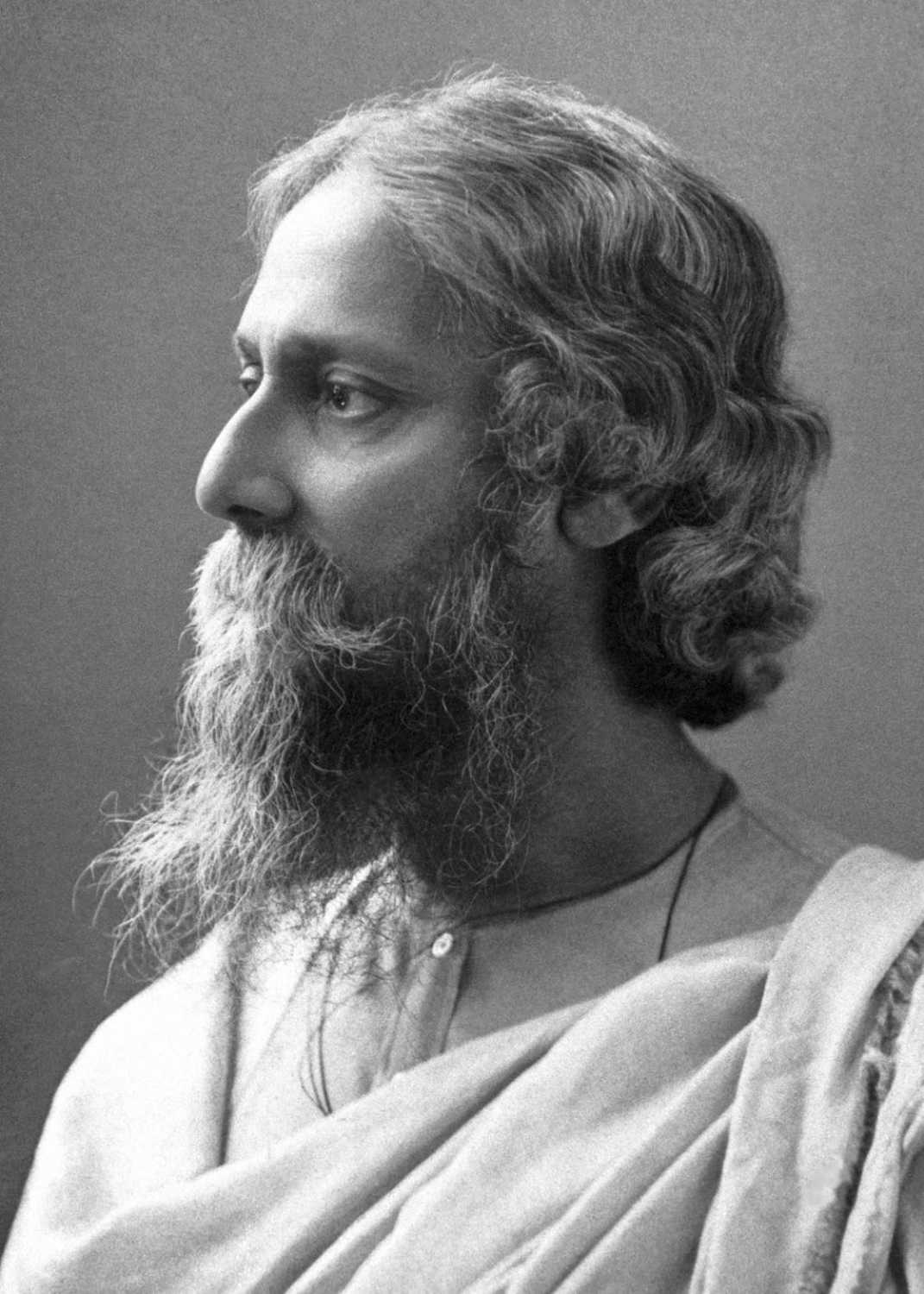
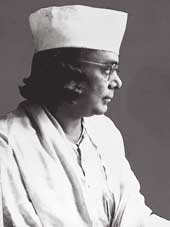
- (clockwise from top to bottom :); The oldest bengali script 'The charyapada' (top), Kazi Nazrul Islam (Bottom right), Rabindranath Tagore (Bottom left).

Bengali literature
- By category Bengali language

Bengali language authors
- Chronological list – Alphabetic List

Bengali writers
- Writers – Novelists – Poets

Forms
- Novel – Poetry – Science Fiction

Institutions and awards
- Literary Institutions; Literary Prizes

Bengali novels occupy a major part of Bengali literature. Despite the evidence of Bengali literary traditions dating back to the 7th century, the format of novel or prose writing did not fully emerge until the early nineteenth century. The development of Bengali novel was fueled by colonial encounter, booming print culture, growth of urban centers, and increased middle-class readership Upanyas, the Bangla word for novel, is derived from the words upanay and upanyasta.

According to Ananda Sanker and Lila Ray, 'when the novel was introduced in Bengali in the middle of the 19th century, the form itself was new, the prose in which it was written was new, the secular tone was new in a country hitherto wholly dominated by religion, and the society in which and for which it was written was new' (p. 168). But some great novelists like Bankim Chandra Chatterjee, Rabindranath Tagore, Manik Bandopadhyay, Tarashankar Bandopadhyay, and Sarat Chandra Chattopadhyay developed the newly introduced genre in such a way that 'new' changed into 'matured' through their works. Almost all these literary activities went on in full swing in Kolkata, which was considered the cultural hub before the partition of Bengal. After 1947, novelists from East Bengal (present-day Bangladesh) gained the platform to focus on their unique identities and Dhaka emerged as a flourishing hub for Bengali novelists. Despite the Bengali common heritage and customs, the political partition was accompanied by partition of literary streams between East and West Bengal. In the twenty-first century, popular contemporary Bengali novels include those written by novelists from both Bengals. Examples include prominent and prolific authors like Humayun Ahmed from Bangladesh and Sunil Gangopadhyay from India.

== Early Novels in Bengali ==
The first Bangla novelists were Peary Chand Mitra (1814–1883) and Kali Prasanna Singha (1840–1870). Under the pen name of 'Tekchand Thakur, Peary Chand Mitra wrote the first Bengali novel Alaler Gharer Dulal (1858). His use of Cholitobhasa (colloquial form of the Bengali language) to narrate the story of Bengali society was unprecedented in the history of printed Bengali literature. Several other Bengali prose fiction published earlier are also considered as claimants of the first Bengali novels. These include: Nabababubilas (1825) by Bhabani Charan Bandyopadhyay and Karuna O Phulmonir Bibaran (1852) by Hana Catherine Mullens.The 1865 novel Durgeshnandini written by Bankim Chandra Chattopadhyay is considered the first significant or worthwhile Bengali novel in the modern period of Bengali literature. The first Bengali Muslim novelist Mir Mosharraf Hossain (1847–1912) published his first novel Ratnabati in 1869 and the first Bengali woman novelist was Swarna Kumari Devi (1855–1932) was widely acclaimed for her novel Dipnirban (1870).

Many of the earliest published novels were written by Kolkata-based writers like Peary Chand Mitra and Kali Prasanna Singh, writers from then-East Bengal are also known to have written novels. Kangal Harinath(1833–1896), based in Kushtia District, now in Bangladesh, published three original novels Bijoy Basanta (1859), Chittachapala (1876) and 'Prem-Promila'. His 1859 novel Bijoy Basanta was so popular that a second edition was published in 1862.

== Modern period of Bengali Literature (1890–1947) ==
Although this period is often called "The Tagore Phase" because of the domination of Rabindranath Tagore in all genres of Bangla literature, the most popular novelist of this period was Sarat Chandra Chattopadhyay. He is best known for his novels, which often portrayed lives, struggles, and hopes of men and women in a relatable manner. His language was easy-to-read and left lasting impression on readers' minds. His work has been translated into many languages and has been adapted into films and television shows. His most popular novels include Badadidi (1913), Bindur Chhele (1914), Ramer Sumati (1914), Pandit Mashai (1914), Biraj Bau (1914), Charitrahin (1914), Chandranath (1916), Pallisamaj (1916), Devdas (1917), Datta (1918), Grhadaha (1920), Dena-Paona (1923), and Baikunther Will (1934).

Although Tagore was most notable as a poet, he wrote twelves novels where he explored the nuances of human relationships, psychological phenomena, and social issues. His most notables novels include: Bauthakuranir Hat (1883) and Rajarsi (1887) based on historical events, Chokher Bali, concerning taboo topic of illicit love, and Gora (1910) featuring a hero who is a European child brought up by a Hindu family.

Bibhutibhushan Bandyopadhyay (1894–1950) was the most popular novelist to succeed Sharat Chandra. Through his work, he narrated the stories of struggle, poverty, hopes, and dreams of ordinary people of rural Bengal. His most famous novels include the trilogy consisting of Pather Panchali (1929), Apur Sangsar, and Aparajita. Among his other novels are Aranyak (1938), Debayan (1944), Drishtipradip (1935), Adarsha Hindu Hotel (1940), and Ichhamati (1949).

Other prominent novelists who shaped mainstream Bengali novels of this era include Jagadish Gupta and Kamal Kumar Majumdar,

=== Novelists from East Bengal during pre-partition era ===
Before 1947, events like Partition of Bengal in 1905, Foundation of Muslim League in 1906 and Unification of Bengali in 1911 inspired the Muslim community of Dhaka to establish a new identity in the horizon of literature. Mohammad Najibar Rahman, Kazi Imdadul Huq, Kazi Abdul Wadud, Sheikh Idrish Ali, Akbaruddin, Abul Fazal, Humayun Kabir, etc. were among the novelists who tried to enrich the novels of the then East Pakistan, present Bangladesh.

Mohammad Najibar Rahman's Anowara was the first notable novel and it moved the whole Bengali Muslim community after publication. According to Rafiqullah Khan, 'The novel could not create any novelty from artistic point of view, but it carried great importance for its picturization of socio-economic and political culture and ideals of the uprising populace' (p. 25, Translation). The main themes of most of the novels in this era were Muslim society, beliefs, and orthodoxy. Examples of novels incorporating these themes are Najibar Rahman's Premer Somadhi (published in 1919) and Goriber Meye (1923), Sheikh Idris Ali's Premer Pothe (1926). In this time, for the first time the life of the Bengali farmers took an artistic delineation through Kazi Abdul Wadud's Nodibakshe (1919).

Then Kazi Imdadul Huq sprinkled a new wave. His famous novel Abdullah was published in periodicals in 1920 and it came into book form in 1933. According to Biswajit Ghosh, this novel was a 'bourgeois and humanitarian revolt against devotion to Peers, religious dogmas, purdah-system and disparity between Ashraf and Atraf'. Later, 'Kazi Abdul Wadud and Humayun Kabir extended this attitude'. Another novelist, Abul Fazal, exposed human psychological analyses in his novel Chouchir (1927). He afterwards continued with his own style and wrote Prodip O Patongo (1940) and Shahoshika (1946). It is well accepted that this type of psychological approach was a first attempt in novels of Bangladesh, though not for the first time in Bengali novels.

== Post-Partition/ Contemporary era (1947–Present) ==
The independence of India and Pakistan from British rule bore more importance for the people of then Bengal. Since then the Bengali speaking community were divided into two parts – the East and the West Bengal. The practice and stream of literary practice also separated ways although both Bengals share common readership.

=== West Bengal stream ===
Novels in post-partition West Bengal portrayed proliferation of socialist ideas. Two of the most notable novelists from this era are Manik Bandopadhyay and Tarashankar Bandyopadhyay. Tarashankar's goal was to write novels with a social purpose. Through his novels, he sketched the tension between socialism and capitalism. His popular novels Raikamal and Kavi, and Hasuli Banker Upakatha (1947) paints the pictures of lives of people with humble means.

Contemporary prominenet novelists from West Bengal include Sunil Gangopadhyay, Shirshendu Mukhopadhyay, Samaresh Majumdar, Mahasweta Devi, and Ashapurna Devi.

=== Bangladesh stream (formerly East Bengal) ===
==== East Pakistan era ====
The independence of India and Pakistan from British rule bore more importance for the people of then Bengal. Since then the Bengali speaking community were divided into two parts – the East and the West Bengal. It turns into the smashing of the millennium-old culture and unity of Bengali nation. Moreover, the existence of language became a great question just after the creation of Pakistan. The West-Pakistan ruling government tried to impose Urdu as the principal language on the Bengali people. But the whole society reacted strongly. This leaves a permanent impression on Bengali literature. In this tumultuous era, Syed Waliullah's Lalsalu (Tree without roots) (1948) was published. It was the foremost successful novel, both from art and reality points of view. Later Syed Waliullah translated it in English by the name Tree Without Roots. Mahbub-ul Alam wrote Mofijon, also published in 1948. A progressive novelist Humayun Kabir wrote an English novel, Rivers and Women, which was published in 1945. The Bengali form was published in 1952 by the name of Nodi O Nari.

In the first years of the Pakistan regime the authors mostly took village life as their theme, but they gradually diversified their interests. Newly born urban society began to establish itself as worthy to be literary contents. Along with them political developments also took place in fiction. Among the first novelists of Pakistan period, Abul Fazal, Akbar Hossain, Shaukat Osman, Abu Rushd, Kazi Afsaruddin, Daulatunnessa Khatun, Syed Waliullah, Sarder Jayenuddin, Abu Ishaque, and Shamsuddin Abul Kalam were the most prominent ones.

Then came a whole generation of extraordinary novelists. Chowdhury Shamsur Rahman, Satyen Sen, Abujafar Shamsuddin, Ahsan Habib, Nilima Ibrahim, Abdur Razzak, Khondkar Md. Eliash, Rashid Karim, Shahidulla Kaisar, Anwar Pasha, Abdar Rashid, Alauddin Al-Azad, Abdul Gaffar Choudhury, Zahir Raihan, Syed Shamsul Haq, Humayun Kadir, Shahid Akhand, Razia Khan, Shawkat Ali, Dilara Hashim, Indu Saha, and Ahmed Sofa were notable names.

In this time, diversity of contents of the novel was noticeable. Village life was the core theme of a huge number of novels. Sometimes it centered the superstitious village mind or the oppression by the influential groups on the common people, some other times depressed womanhood took this place. Love between men and women in pastoral context were also a subject of many novels. Lalshalu by Syed Waliullah, Kashboner Konna by Shamsuddin Abul Kalam, Surjo Dighol Bari by Abu Ishaque, Meghabaran Kesh by Ishaq Chakhari, Adiganta by Sardar Jayenunddin, Mohuar Desh by Tasadduk Hossain, Janani by Shaukat Osman, Jhar by Syed Sahadat Hossain, Karnafully by Alauddin Al-Azad, Sareng Bou and Sangsaptak by Shahidulla Kaisar, Aranya Mithun by Badruddin Ahmad, Modhumoti by Rabeya Khatun, Hazar Bachhar Dhore by Zahir Raihan, Bobakahini by Jasimuddin, Pannamoti by Sardar Jayenuddin etc. incorporated these themes.

Middle class society began to evolve in this time. Urban life, its problems and complexities, uprising middle-class people, their social context and love in their life started to be portrayed in a good number of novels. Jibon Pother Jatri by Abul Fazal, Pother Porosh (1957) by Daulatunnessa Khatun, Bhorer Bihongi (1958) by Satyen Sen, Surjer Niche (1958) by Atahar Ahmad, Pathasranta (1959) by Nilima Ibrahim, Shesh Bikeler Meye (1960) by Zahir Raihan, Kanyakumari (1960) by Abdur Razzak, Uttam Purush (1961) by Rashid Karim, Ek Path Dui Bank (1962) by Nilima Ibrahim, Akash Jodi Nil Hoi (1962) and Ihai To Prem (1963) by Syed Sahadat Hossain, Prasanno Pashan (1963) by Rashid Karim, Pingal Aakash (1963) by Shawkat Ali, Akasher Rong (1964) by Zobeda Khanam, Panna Holo Sobuz (1964) by Shahid Akhand, Nirjan Megh (1965) by Humayun Kadir, Ghar Mon Janala (1965) by Dilara Hashim, Aronyo Nilima (1965) by Ahsan Habib, Antahshila (1967) by Kazi Md. Idris, Digonter Swapno (1967) by Razia Majid, Mon Ek Shet Kopoti (1967), Shaheb Bazar (1967) and Ananto Aneysha (1967) by Rabeya Khatun, Bipani Mon (1968) by Mir Abul Hossain, Sourav (1968) by Anis Chowdhury, Anishchita Ragini (1969) by Abu Rushd, Borof Gola Nodi (1969) by Zahir Raihan, Rajabagh Shahimar Bagh (1969) by Rabeya Khatun etc. are significant novels of this stream.

But the background of another major event was being prepared in this time. The country began to experience turmoil. The political situation of the country became more and more prominent in the novels also. In novels like Nongor by Abu Rushd and Mon Na Moti by Anis Siddique, Jibon Khuda by Abul Monsoor Ahmed exposed the context of Pakistan Movement. Communal picture out of this movement and the restoration of Hindu-Muslim harmony also became core content in a number of novels including Ranga Probhat by Abul Fazal, Khuda O Asha by Alauddin Al-Azad, Neer Sandhani and Nishuti Rater Gatha by Anwar Pasha etc.

Then came the historic event of the Bengali language movement. The keen eyes of the novelists were nowhere but on this tremendous incident. Jahir Raihan's Aarek Falgoon was the most significant effort on language movement. Other political incidents like the class conflict, socialism, and movement in the cultivators was depicted in the novels like Dui Mohol (later on renamed as Alamnagorer Upokotha) by Shamsuddin Abul Kalam, Surjo Tumi Sathi by Ahmad Sofa etc. Shaukat Osman wrote wonderful symbolic political novels Kritodasher Hashi and Raja Upakhyan. Abdul Gaffar Chowdhury's Chandradwiper Upakhyan and Nam Na Jana Bhore portrayed the uprising farmer society and its conflicts.

There were some historical novels also. Abujafar Shamsuddin's Bhaowal Gorer Upakhayan about the Faraizi Movement, Sardar Jayenuddin's Nil Rong Rokto about the Indigo revolt, Satyen Sen's Kumarajiva about the spread of Buddhism, and Oporajeyo about the Sepoy Revolt etc. are a few examples among them. Some novelists favoured psychological complexities. With his unique presentation and language of his own, Syed Waliullah wrote Chander Amabashya and Kando Nodi Kando keeping psychological analysis in the centre.

Another trend of novels having emphasis on the sexual behaviours and deviations of the characters began to mark its own place during the sixties. Razia Khan's Bot-tolar Uponyas, and Anukolpo was among the first novels of this trend. Alauddin Al-Azad's Teish Nambor Toilochitro, Shiter Sheshrat Boshonter Prothomdin and Syed Shamsul Haq's Ek Mohilar Chhobi, Anupama Din, Simana Chhariye etc. are mentionables in this regard.

Afterwards came the most memorable days of Bangali nation. After ten-month long war Bangalis became independent nation. After the massacre of three million people and huge violation and harassment of womenfolk and loss of property Bangladesh emerged as a secular and democratic nation on 16 December 1971, and Bangladeshi novel enters into a new era.

==== Bangladesh era ====
Most of the writers who were contributing in the pre-liberation period were also very creative in this period. Rashid Karim wrote novels based on middle-class society and their societal and psychological analysis. Alauddin Al-Azad, Shawkat Ali, Razia Khan and Dilara Hashim, Mahmudul Haque, Ahmad Sofa, Syed Shamsul Haq is among other notable names. Syed Shamsul Haq, commonly known as Syed Huq, wrote a good number of novels along with a huge number of books of other genres. He is always very experimental in both technique and form. Khelaram Khele Ja placed him in great controversy for his open delineation of human sexual behaviour. In his novels like Duratto, Mahashunye Poran Master, Ek Juboker Chhayapoth etc. Liberation war, its consequences, hopeless human existence and analysis of human mind and society take sharp pen-picture. Another powerful writer Shawkat Ali wrote Prodoshe Praakritojon, which is a real representation of the twelfth century Bengali during King Lakhkhan Sen. His trilogy Dakshinayaner Din, Kulaya Kalasrot and Purbaratri Purbadin deserve much compliment. Mahmudul Haque wrote Anur Pathshala before liberation war in 1967. He wrote Nirapod Tondra, Khelaghar (written 1978, published 1988), Kalo Borof (written in 1977, published in 1992), and Matir Jahaj (written in 1977, published in 1996). Ahmad Sofa, wrote novels with different tone. In Onkar (1975) he portrayed the suppressed Bangali mind of the pre-liberation period in a very artistic and symbolic way. In Gaavi Brityanto he presents the contemporary picture in a meticulous allegory. Ardhek Nari Ardhek Ishwari, a novel of romantic love, is widely considered as his masterpiece. His Pushpa Brikhkha Ebong Bihongo Puran is a narration of true human affinity to nature.

After the liberation war, freedom fight became a unique subject. The first of this discipline is Anwar Pasha's Rifle Roti Awrat that he wrote during the war. Shaukat Osman's Jahannam Hoite Bidai, Nekre Aranyo, Dui Soinik, Rashid Haider's Khanchai, Andho Kothamala, Shawkat Ali's Jatraa, Selina Hossain's Hangor Nodi Granade, Mahmudul Huq's Jiban Aamar Bone, Syed Shamsul Haq's Nil Dangshon, Nishiddho Loban, Harun Habib's Priyo Joddha Priyotoma, Humayun Ahmed's Jochona O Jononir Golpo etc. are examples of novels which directly deal freedom fight as their subject. Besides this, novels like Amar Jato Glani by Rashid Karim, Ferari Surjo by Rabeya Khatun, Abelay Ashamoy by Amjad Hossain also portray the different facets of liberation war. Rashid Karim's Prem Ekti Lal Golap, Ekaler Rupkotha or Sadharon Loker Kahini are presentation of the hopeless picture of Bangladesh after the war. 'Critics say that though after the liberation huge number of novels was written about our war, none of them could depict the historic incident in necessary epic form'.

New faces appeared in the literary world after the liberation. Among them, Selina Hossain, Humayun Ahmed, Hasnat Abdul Hye, Rizia Rahman, Jubaida Gulshan Ara Hena, and Bashir al-Helal were the most prominent.

Selina Hossain started with Jalochchhwas and till now she has authored more than twenty-one novels. Her Hangor Nodi Granade is a success written on Bangladesh Liberation War. She has written novels like Taanaporen on coastal life and natural disaster. Gayatree Sondhya (3 volumes: published in, 1994, 1995, 1996), Kalketu O Fullora, Chandbene are some of her historical novels.

Abdur Rouf Choudhury's novel Natun Diganta (three volumes: published in 1991, 1992, 1993 and complete collection in 2005 by Pathak Shamabesh) is a quality work of art by any standard and most successful writing on pre- Bangladesh Liberation War. Choudhury most vividly depicted the unity of Bengal and the articulation of Bengali nationalism in his novel Natun Diganta (New Horizon) (vols. 1–3). Reason and humanity – these are its two eternal pillars. The essence of Choudhury's thought is a complete faith in the efficiency of these two immeasurable forces. Its most striking characteristic is its insistent association of work, precept and practice. It appeals not to controversial tests, not to any appearance of sweet reasonableness but to trials in the rough and tumble of life, and it will accept no other judgment. Natun Diganta gives warning against: 1) dogma, mysticism, ceremonial, hypnotism, the binding of the mind and will by oaths, and other inventions of external authority in religion and politics, 2) participation in violence, individual or social, and organisation's dependence on violence, 3) exploitation, luxury and material property, 4) self-degradation and 5) devotion to self-sacrifice.

Humayun Ahmed, perhaps the most popular novelist in Bengali after Sarat Chandra Chattopadhyay, appeared with his novel Nondito Noroke and then Shonkhoneel Karagar. Later he gradually turned to less serious things. Almost all of his novels are best sellers. Some of his titles are 1971, Daruchinir Deep, Brihonnola, Joyjoyonti, Kobi etc. Humayun Ahmed's Tomader Jonno Valobasa is the first science fiction novel in Bangladesh.

A serious poet, essayist and literary researcher Abdul Mannan Syed published his first novel Pariprekshter Dasdashi in 1974. Later on he wrote Kolkata, Poramatir Kaaj, O Te Ojogor, Hei Songsar Hei Lota, Khudha, Prem, Aagun, Shyamoli Tomar Mukh etc. Hasnat Abdul Hye, arrived with his Suprobhat Bhalobasa. By now he has written at least twenty novels. Along with his other novels he has introduced a different form of novels called biographical. Sultan, Ekjon Aaroj Ali and Novera are example of this form. All of these novels are based on the biographical sketches of giant Bangali characters. Rizia Rahman's Uttar Purush came in black and white in 1977. She wrote some fifteen novels in the eighties. Her voluminous Bongo Theke Bangla is an epic composition about the past culture and heritage of Bangali nation. Her other major novels are Rokter Okhkhor, Alikhito Upakhyan, Ekal Chirokal, Prem Aamar Prem, Ekti Phuler Jonyo, Harun Fereni etc. Bashir al-Helal's Kalo Elish was published in 1979. His other novels include Ghritokumari, Shesh Panpatro, Nurjahander Modhumas etc.

In the eighties, Bangladeshi novel got some senior writers who wrote novels for the first time along with some promising young ones. Among the earlier writers Abubakar Siddique's Jalarakshas and Kharadaha appeared with much novelty. His important later novel is Ekatturer Hridoybhashma. Makbula Manjoor started in the late years of the sixties, but most of her novels came out in the eighties and nineties. Kaler Mondira is one of her most notable work. Rahat Khan wrote novels about middle class city people, their joys and sorrows, love and separation. His significant works include Omol Dhabol Chakri, Ek Priyodorshini, Chhayadampoti, Hai Shunyota, Sangharsho, Shahar, Hai Anonter Pakhi, Modhyomather Khelowar etc.

Akhtaruzzaman Elias, one of the most artistic but least productive writers, wrote only two novels. He has started his journey with Chilekothar Sepai. His most prestigious work Khoabnama, which came out in 1996, is considered a milestone in the history of Bengali novels.

Another senior novelist Abu Ishaque's second novel Padmar Palidwip was published in 1986, after thirty-one years of his debut novel Surjo Dighal Bari. Appearance and disappearance of Chars (strip of sandy land), their effect on nearby humanity etc. have taken a keen narration in Padmar Palidwip.

Haripada Datta is also a worthy name. His two-volume novel Ojogor (Vol. I −1989, Vol. II-1991) chronicles the recent history very remarkably. His previous novels are Eshane Ognidaho and Ondhokupe Janmothsob. In 2000 he wrote an epic volume titled Jonmo Jonmantor.

From the early years of the eighties, the arrival of some young novelists who, later on, obtained enough popularity, was heard. Monju Sarkar, Imdadul Haq Milan and Moinul Ahsan Saber are the few but most common names in this regard. Monju Sarkar's Tamosh, Nagno Agontuk, Protima Upakhyan and Abashbhumi, Imdadul Haq Milan's Jabojjibon (written in 1976, published in 1900), Nodi Upakhyan, Bhumiputro, Poradhinota, Rajakartontro, Moinul Ahsan Saber's Adomer Jonye Opekhkha, Pathor Somoy, Char Torun Toruni, Manush Jekhane Jai Na, Dharabahik Kahin, Opeksha, Kobej Lethel, Tumi Amake Niye Jabe, Prem O Protishodh, Songsher Japon got much recognition from the literati. Shahidul Zahir, wrote his first novel Jibon O Rajnoitic Bastobota, published in 1988 while his second, till now the last, Shei Rate Purnima Chhilo came out in 1995. Magic realism, which is a recent trend of the Latin American novels, takes place in Shahidul Zahir's narration.

The last decade of twentieth century is comparatively fruitful for Bangladeshi novels. Al Mahmud's novelistic exposition, Bipradas Barua's Buddhist life, Humayun Azad's brave creations, Akimun Rahman's novels about womanhood, Nasreen Jahan's novels of magic realism, Shamsuddin Abul Kalam's historic work Kanchongram is few mark of this decade. Syed Shamsul Haq's masterpiece Bristi O Bidrohigon, published in 1998, is a milestone on the past heritage and liberation war. Senior poet Al Mahmud's debut novel Dahuki came out in 1992 which was followed by Kobi O Kolahol, Upamohadesh, Kabiler Bone, Purush Sundor, Nishinda Nari etc. Bipradas Barua's major novels are Somudrochar O Bidrohira, Muktijoddhara, Shromon Goutam etc.

Humayun Azad commenced his novelist career with Chhappanno Hajar Borgomail in 1994, which was a courageous slap on martial law and dictatorship. In no time the novel brought its writer much name and popularity. His later novels include Sab Kichu Bhene Pare, Pak Sar Jamin Sad Bad, Nijer Shonge Nijer Jiboner Modhu, Ekti Khuner Svapna etc. Mohammad Nurul Huda, a renowned poet, had also two attempts in novel. Excepting Janmajati and Moinpahar he did not make any third attempt. Akimun Rahman is the first novelist ever in Bengali language in whose writing the untold and unknown secrets of womanhood are getting tongue. She has by now written four novels, Purusher Prithibite Ek Meye, Roktopunje Genthe Jawya Machhi, Pashe Shudhu Chhaya Chhilo, and Jeebaner Roudre Udechhilo Kayekti Dhulikana. Another notable novelist is Nasreen Jahan. Her first novel Urukku arrived with much appreciation. In her novels like Chondrer Prothom Kola, Chondrolekhar Jaadubistar, Sonali Mukhosh, Ure Jai Nishipakhkhi etc., she manipulated the elements of magic realism. Anisul Hoque, a journalist by profession, has established himself as a renowned writer. His Andhokarer Ekshaw Bachhar presented him a very honourable place but Ma (The Mother) has given him international reputation. Imtiar Shamim is also a young but promising name for the novels of recent Bangladesh. In Dana Kata Himer Bhetor he presented an NGO-world. His Amra Hetechhi Jara encompassed a very touching story of the sorry saga of post-independence Bangladesh life. In the first decade of the 21st century, literary critic and essayist Syed Manzoorul Islam wrote some experimental novels like Adhkhana Manush, Tin Parber Jiban etc.; he also co-authored Jogajoger Gabheer Samasya Niye Kayekjan Eka Eka Lok which is one of few metafiction novels in Bengali. Agunpakhi by Hasan Azizul Huq received wide critical acclaim both in Bangladesh and India and two important literary award Prothom Alo book of the year prize in 2007 and Ananda Purashkar in 2008. Among other notable works, Shahaduz Zaman's novel Bishorgo Te Dukkho is a pioneer work of the genre of metafiction in Bengali, and his Crutch-er Colonel is a popular historical novel on the life of Colonel Taher.

== Top novels of West Bengal, India ==
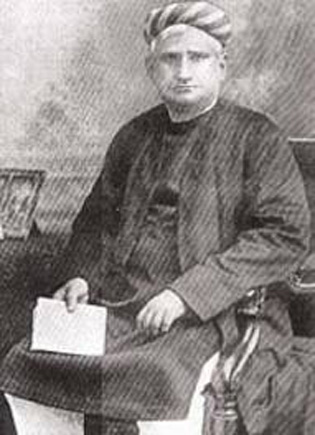
Bankim Chandra Chatterjee

#	Novel	Author
1	Durgeshnandini	Bankim Chandra Chattopadhyay
2	Kapalkundala	Bankim Chandra Chattopadhyay
3	Madhabi Kankan	Ramesh Chandra Dutta
4	Gora	Rabindranath Tagore
5	Ghare Baire	Rabindranath Tagore
6	Char Addhyay	Rabindranath Tagore
7	Shesher Kabita	Rabindranath Tagore
8	Noukadubi	Rabindranath Tagore
9	Pather Dabi	Sharat Chandra Chattopadhyay
10	Shesh Prashna	Sharat Chandra Chattopadhyay
11	Aparajito	Bibhutibhushan Bandopadhyay
12	Pather Panchali	Bibhutibhushan Bandyopadhyay
13	Aranyak	Bibhutibhushan Bandyopadhyay
14	Debjan	Bibhutibhushan Bandyopadhyay
15	Ganadevata	Tarasankar Bandyopadhyay
16	Nagini Kanyar Kahini	Tarasankar Bandyopadhyay
17	Hansuli Banker Upakatha	Tarasankar Bandyopadhyay
18	Putul Nacher Itikatha	Manik Bandyopadhyay
19	Dibaratrir Kabya	Manik Bandopadhyay
20	Padma Nadir Majhi	Manik Bandyopadhyay
21	Jagari	Satinath Bhaduri
22	Antarjali Jatra	Kamal Kumar Majumdar
23	Ekhon Amar Kono Asukh Nei	Sandipan Chattopadhyay
24	Rubi Kakhan Asbe	Sandipan Chattopadhyay
25	Jiban Je Rakam	Sunil Gangopadhyay
26	Prathom Alo	Sunil Gangopadhyay
27	Sei Somoy	Sunil Gangopadhyay
28	Uttar Jahnabi	Syed Mustafa Siraj
29	Aleek Manush	Syed Mustafa Siraj
30	Trinabhumi	Syed Mustafa Siraj
31	Panchyajanya	Gajendrakumar Mitra
32	Ghunpoka	Shirshendu Mukhopadhyay
33	Purna Apurna	Bimal Kar
34	Kharkuto	Bimal Kar
35	Banpalashir Padabali	Ramapada Choudhury
36	Dweeper Naam Tiarong	Ramapada Choudhury
37	Mirar Dupur	Jyotirindra Nandi
38	Baaro Ghar Ek Uthon	Jyotirindra Nandi
39	Ei Taar Puroshkar	Jyotirindra Nandi
40	Nilkantha Pakhir Khonje	Atin Bandyopadhyay
41	Aloukik Jalajan	Atin Bandyopadhyay
42	Manusher Gharbari	Atin Bandyopadhyay
43	Ishwarer Bagan	Atin Bandyopadhyay
44	Dubjaley Jetuku Prashwas	Malay Roy Choudhury
45	Kheladhula	Basudeb Dasgupta
46	Bramhavargab Puran	Kamal Chakrabarty
47	Brikhu	Kamal Chakrabarty
48	Herbert	Nabarun Bhattacharya
49	Matam	Barin Ghosal
50	Suryaheen	Arupratan Ghosh
51	Lohitparer Upakatha	Samar Deb
52	Tungabhadrar Tire	Sharadindu Bandopadhyay
53	Mohulbonir Sereng	Tapan Bondyopadhyay
54	Shankhachil	Sayantani Putatunda
55	Ichhamoti	Bibhutibhushan Bondopadhyay
56	Keya Patar Nouko	Prafulla Roy
57	Uttal Somoyer Itikotha	Prafulla Roy
58	Shotodharay Boye Jaay	Prafulla Roy
59	Devdas	Sarat Chandra Chattopadhyay
60	Srikanta	Sarat Chandra Chattopadhyay
