= Naree =

Book written by Bangladeshi author Humayun Azad on feminism

- Author: Humayun Azad
- Cover artist: Uttam Sen
- Language: Bengali
- Subject: Feminism
- Genre: non-fiction
- Publisher: Agamee Prakashani, Dhaka
- Publication date: 1992
- Publication place: Bangladesh
- Media type: Print (hardcover)
- Pages: 408 (third edition)
- ISBN: 978-984-04-0077-5

Naree (English: Woman) is a 1992 Bangladeshi treatise book about feminism written by Humayun Azad. The book was considered incendiary, and was banned on 19 November 1995, by the government of Bangladesh. Five years later, though, in 2000, the ban was lifted, following a legal battle that Azad won. The High Court of Bangladesh decided that the prohibition was invalid.

== Summary ==
The book in Bengali is a feminist analysis of women's status and condition in civilizations created by men. This is the first comprehensive discussion in Bengali about feminism and the difficulties that Bengali women face in their daily lives. Azad is critic of acclaimed figures, notably Rabindranath Tagore and Bankim Chandra Chatterjee.

Azad has taken help from many western books to write this book, this has been mentioned in the introduction of the book by Azad himself.

== Chapters ==
| # | Original Bengali titles | English translation | Page starts | Page ends |
|---|---|---|---|---|
| 1 | নারী, ও তার বিধাতাঃ পুরুষ | Woman and her god: Man | 19 | 25 |
| 2 | লৈঙ্গিক রাজনীতি | Gender politics | 26 | 42 |
| 3 | দেবী ও দানবী | Goddess and demoness | 43 | 56 |
| 4 | নারীজাতির ঐতিহাসিক মহাপরাজয় | Historical defeat of women | 57 | 69 |
| 5 | পিতৃতন্ত্রের খড়গঃ আইন বা বিধিবিধান | Patriarchy's punishment: Laws or rules | 70 | 88 |
| 6 | নারীর শত্রুমিত্রঃ রুশো, রাসকিন, রবীন্দ্রনাথ এবং জন স্টুয়ার্ট মিল | Women's friends and foes: Rousseau, Ruskin, Rabindranath and John Stuart Mill | 89 | 150 |
| 7 | ফ্রয়েডীয় কুসংস্কার, ও মনোবিশ্লেষাণাত্মক-সমাজবৈজ্ঞানিক প্রতিক্রিয়াশীলতা | Freudian superstition and psycho-analytic sociological-scientific criticism | 151 | 176 |
| 8 | নারী, তার লিঙ্গ ও শরীর | Woman, her sex organ and body | 177 | 186 |
| 9 | বালিকা | Girl | 187 | 200 |
| 10 | কিশোরীতরুণী | Woman's adolescence and youth | 201 | 215 |
| 11 | নষ্টনীড় | Spoiled nest | 216 | 222 |
| 12 | প্রেম ও কাম | Romance and amorousness | 223 | 232 |
| 13 | বিয়ে ও সংসার | Marriage and household | 233 | 246 |
| 14 | ধর্ষণ | Rape | 247 | 257 |
| 15 | মেরি ওলস্টোনক্র্যাফ্টঃ অগ্নিশিখা ও অশ্রুবিন্দু | Mary Wollstonecraft: Flames and tears | 258 | 269 |
| 16 | রামমোহন ও বিদ্যাসাগরঃ প্রাণদাতা ও জীবনদাতা | Raja Ram Mohan Roy and Ishwar Chandra Vidyasagar: The creator and the life provider | 270 | 281 |
| 17 | পুরুষতন্ত্র ও রোকেয়ার নারীবাদ | Patriarchy and Begum Rokeya's feminism | 282 | 299 |
| 18 | বঙ্গীয় ভদ্রমহিলাঃ উন্নত জাতের নারী উৎপাদন | Bengali ladies: Making of modern women | 300 | 312 |
| 19 | নারীবাদী সাহিত্যতত্ত্ব ও সমালোচনা | Feminist literal theory and criticism | 313 | 331 |
| 20 | নারীদের নারীরাঃ নারীদের উপন্যাসে নারীভাবমূর্তি | Women's women: Women's representation in women's novels | 332 | 359 |
| 21 | নারীর ভবিষ্যৎ | Women's future | 360 | 371 |
| 22 | নারীবাদ, ও নারীবাদের কালপঞ্জি | Feminism and its timeline | 372 | 386 |
| 23 | রচনাপঞ্জি | References of English books | 387 | 395 |
| 24 | নির্ঘন্ট | References of Bengali books | 396 | 407 |

== See also ==
- Humayun Azad bibliography
- List of books banned by governments
- Blasphemy law in Bangladesh
- Women in Bangladesh
- Feminism in Bangladesh
