= Muktadhara =

Indian Bengali-language publisher and bookstore

Muktadhara (Bengali: মুক্তধারা) is an international organization, publishing house and bookstore dedicated to the promotion of Bengali literature and culture. It was started in the Indian state of West Bengal by the late Chittaranjan Saha, who in his work as head of the publishing house pioneered the Ekushey Book Fair. In addition to its early involvement with The Ekushey Book Fair, the organization is connected to other cultural Bengali events, like International Language Day and the International Bengali Festival. It also participates in the spread of literature and culture by taking part in such events as the National Poetry Festival.

The Muktadhara book sellers & Publishers chain, founded by Saha's younger brother Bishawjit Saha who is the Founder of Muktadhara Foundation Inc and current president of the Muktadhara Inc. has four stores in the United States. Its New York City store is the largest Bengali-language bookstore in the city.

== History ==
In a 2008 interview, Muktadhara's director Jawhar Lal Shaha explained that Muktadhara, which takes its name from the Bengali words for "free-flowing stream", was founded in the late 1960s and grew from Chittaranjan Saha's gatherings with writers exiled in Kolkata from Bangladesh during the Bangladesh Liberation War of 1971. Saha, who promoted the publication of writings for their country, published 32 books during the war, founding Muktadhara in Kolkata. After the war, Saha relocated to Bangladesh and began publishing creative works as well. In 2004, poet Mohammad Nurul Huda retrospectively described Muktadhara publishing house as "the most notable of its kind in the post-independence literary world of the country", indicating that "any book coming out of Muktadhara was deemed as up-to-the-mark". The poet attributed this to the custom of the publishing house to subject manuscripts to review by a panel of readers, adding that "no manuscript saw the light of day if it was not duly recommended by the reviewers and concerned editor".

In 1972, Saha began selling publications from Muktadhara on the grounds of the Bangla Academy during the weeklong celebration of Language Day. Gradually, Muktadhara was joined by other publishers, and in 1978 the Bangla Academy formalized the collection of sellers as the Ekushey Book Fair.

Bishwajit Saha founded The New York branch of Muktadhara in 1990 as a bookstore operating out of his apartment in Jackson Heights. Subsequently, on 21 February 1992, Muktadhara and a number of other organizations joined together to place a temporary monument honoring the student martyrs killed forty years before protesting the exclusion of Bengali from the official language list of Pakistan, a tradition which has become annual. The New York Branch has also launched community writing workshops, reading series in conjunction with various school and community projects, and, since 1992, the International Bengali Book Fair in New York and other cities in North America. In 2008, publishing houses from multiple countries are expected to participate, with confirmed participation by a number of international guest, including Foreign Adviser Iftekhar Ahmed Chowdhury and poet Sunil Ganguly.

The New York branch has also honored the "10 Greatest Bengalis Alive", a list garnered by online survey commenced in December 2004 and concluded on 31 May 2005, promoted with international outreach. The list was announced at New York's Manhattan Center on 28 August 2005, with guests of honor Carolyne Wright and Clinton B. Seely also celebrating the 15th anniversary of the New York branch.

On 25 April 2008 Muktadhara hosted Muhammad Yunus, the 2006 Nobel Peace Prize winner. The Nobel laureate revealed his new book, Creating a World without Poverty. Rashidul Bari, the author of Grameen Social Business Model: A Manifesto for Proletariat Revolution, and the producer of the film The Killing of Muhammad Yunus Biographer, welcomed the Nobel laureate at Muktadhara.
