= Blasphemy law in Bangladesh =

The People's Republic of Bangladesh went from being a secular state in 1971 to having Islam as the state religion in 1988. Despite its state religion, Bangladesh uses a secular penal code dating from 1860—the time of the British occupation. The penal code discourages blasphemy by a section that forbids "hurting religious sentiments." Other laws permit the government to confiscate and to ban the publication of blasphemous material. Government officials, police, soldiers, and security forces may have discouraged blasphemy by extrajudicial actions including torture. Schools run by the government have Religious Studies in the curriculum.

== Laws ==
Under Section 295A of Bangladesh's Penal Code (1860), any person who has a "deliberate" or "malicious" intention of "hurting religious sentiments" is liable to imprisonment.

Under clauses 99(a), (b), (c), (d), (e), and (f) of The Code of Criminal Procedure, "the government may confiscate all copies of a newspaper if it publishes anything subversive of the state or provoking an uprising or anything that creates enmity and hatred among the citizens or denigrates religious beliefs. The magistrate can send police with a warrant to the place where these newspapers are found. The aggrieved person can take the matter to the notice of the high court." Under clause 108, "a magistrate can ask for an undertaking from a person who has made an attempt to express anything seditious or create class-conflict." Clause 144 allows a magistrate to forbid a journalist from going to his place of work.

In 1993, Motiur Rahman Nizami, Secretary General of the Bangladesh Jamaat i Islami—the largest Bangladeshi Islamic party, tabled in Parliament a "blasphemy bill." Modeled on existing Pakistani laws, the bill proposed to add to the Penal Code two sections: 295B and 295C. Section 295B would have created the new offence of "insult to the Quran," and would have had a maximum sentence of life imprisonment. Section 295C would have created the new offence of "insult to the Prophet," and would have had a maximum sentence of death.

In 2004, a private member's bill, which was never tabled in Parliament, proposed that any speech, or gesture, by words or otherwise, or any picture, film or artwork, or behavior, which insults any religion, or which insults the Quran, the Sunnah, or Sharia would be punishable by two years' imprisonment.

== Selected cases ==
- Lynching of Dipu Chandra Das
- A Hindu priest, Joy Kumar Ghosh, was detained in April 2025 for "hurting religious sentiments". An official of Kohinoor Chemical Company (Bangladesh) Limited was detained for making comments against Prophet Mohammad.
- In April 2013, four bloggers (Moshiur Rahman Biplob, Russell Parvez, Subrata Adhikari Shubho and Asif Mohiuddin) were arrested for "hurting religious sentiments" with their "derogatory" postings on blogs and social networking sites.
- On 17 September 2007, a cartoon appeared in the satire magazine Alpin (Pin). The cartoon made fun of the custom in Muslim countries of putting "Mohammed" in front of one's given name. The drawing was accompanied by this dialogue:

"Boy, what's your name?
My name is Babu.
It is customary to put Mohammed in front of the name.
What is your father's name?
Mohammed Abu.
What is that on your lap?
Mohammed cat."

- On 18 September 2007, Alpin's cartoonist Arifur Rahman was arrested and jailed, and editor Sumanta Aslam was dismissed. A Dhaka district magistrate ordered suspension of the magazine's publication. Hizb ut-Tahrir, a movement to unite all Muslim nations, led a campaign demanding closure of Alpin's parent newspaper, Prothom Alo. At that time, Prothom Alo was Bangladesh's largest circulation paper, and a frequent critic of the Islamists. The campaign occurred when the Information Ministry was headed by barrister Mainul Hossein, owner of Ittefaq, one of Prothom Alo's rival newspapers. On 20 March 2008, a court in Dhaka ordered a stay of proceedings and ordered Rahman's release from jail because the officer who had investigated the case had failed to appear after repeated summonses. On 12 November 2009, the court removed the stay of proceedings, and tried Rahman in absentia. The court sentenced Rahman to two months in jail with hard labour and a fine of 500 taka (US$7.40).
- In 2007, the government banned the Eid issue of the weekly Shaptahik 2000 because of a blasphemous reference in an autobiographical article by Daud Haider.
- In 2005, Mohd Rafiqul Islam Rony MP laid a complaint against professor Ali Asghar for causing hurt to religious sentiment by his alleged remark that religious instruction need not be compulsory.
- In January 2004, the government banned all Amadhi religious publications. In December 2004, the High Court put a stay on the ban.
- In 2003, vigilantism against Ahmadis resulted in the death of an imam and the injury of others.
- In 2002, the police arrested the members of an amateur theater group in Faridpur, among whom were Hindus, for "causing hurt to religious sentiment" by their play.
- In 2002, the Bangladesh Censor Board banned Tareque Masud and Catherine Masud's film Matir Moina (The Clay Bird) because its setting (a madrassa in 1971) was deemed religiously sensitive. The Appeal Board lifted the ban.
- In 2000, four senior editors of Jonokontho are sued on blasphemy charges in Shamsuddin Ahmed and others v. The State.
- In 2000, criminals killed Monir Hossain Sagar (of Delduar in Tangail), the author of the book Nari Tumi Manush Chhile Kobey. The killers claimed that the book had indecent remarks about Allah and Prophet Mohammed.
- In 1995, the government banned Naree (Woman) by Humayun Azad because the book analyzes religious doctrine. Azad was able to have the ban lifted in 2000. In 2004, attackers with machetes badly injured Professor Azad outside the annual Ekushey Book Fair. After his recovery, Azad moved to Germany, where he soon died.
- In 1993, Taslima Nasreen released Lajja (Shame), a novel. It is about the rights of Hindus in Bangladesh, and its last sentence has the Hindu protagonist and his family leaving Bangladesh for India. The government immediately banned the novel. Militant Islamist groups announced a bounty on Nasreen's head. She fled to Europe. In 1999, Nasreen released volume 1 of her autobiography, Amar Meyebela (My Girlhood) in India. Bangladesh's government banned the book from being imported, sold, or distributed. In 2002, the police in Bangladesh were under orders to confiscate all copies of volume 2 of Nasreen's autobiography Utal Hawa (Wild Wind) after the Home Ministry declared its publication, sale, and distribution illegal. In October 2002, a court sentenced Nasreen in absentia to a year in jail for her "derogatory remarks about Islam." In 2008, her books were openly sold by street hawkers in Bangladesh, but Nasreen dared not go there.
- In 1992, Dr. Ahmed Sharif faced charges under sections 295A and 298 of the penal code because Inquilab, a daily, published remarks allegedly by Sharif that were critical of Islam. Sharif allegedly made the remarks during a private seminar.
- In 1974, Enamul Haq published a leaflet that made reference to Prophet Mohammed's wives. Protests ensued. Haq spent some time in protective custody.
- In 1973, Daud Haider published a poem in which he allegedly insults Prophet Mohammed, Jesus Christ, and Gautama Buddha. The police took Haider into protective custody. He fled to India in 1974 or 1975. Later, he moved to Germany.

== See also ==
- Apostasy in Islam
- Attacks on secularists in Bangladesh
- Blasphemy law
- Buddhism in Bangladesh
- Christianity in Bangladesh
- Freedom of religion in Bangladesh
- Hinduism in Bangladesh
- International Covenant on Civil and Political Rights
- Islam and blasphemy
- Islam in Bangladesh
- Persecution of Hindus
- Secularism in Bangladesh
- Sharia#Compatibility with human rights
