= Nijer Shonge Nijer Jiboner Modhu =

Bengali novel by Humayun Azad

- Author: Humayun Azad
- Language: Bengali
- Subject: Bengali rural life, boyhood, adolescence, juvenile sexuality
- Genre: Novel
- Set in: 1960s decades's East Pakistan's Bikrampur
- Publisher: Agamee Prakashani
- Publication date: February 2000
- Publication place: Bangladesh
- Media type: Print
- Pages: 160 (3rd print, 2006)
- ISBN: 978-984-04-1697-4
- OCLC: 45790727

Nijer Shonge Nijer Jiboner Modhu (Bengali: নিজের সঙ্গে নিজের জীবনের মধু, lit. 'The honey of one's life with himself') is a Bengali novel written by Bangladeshi author Humayun Azad. It was first published in February 2000 in Ekushey Book Fair by Agamee Prakashani. The novel tells the story of a boy's rural life of Bikrampur of 1960s decade and is believed to be inspired by author's own childhood life as Azad was also born and brought up in Bikrampur which is now known as Munshiganj District, however the fictitious character Jalkador, who is the main protagonist of the novel, belongs to a farmer-family and Azad was not from a farmer-family though he was grown up in a village in Bikrampur.

The main subject of the novel is about life-leading of a boy named Jalkador in a village in Bikrampur (Bikrampur is now known as Munshiganj District) in 1960s decade when Bangladesh was known as East Pakistan. The novel tells the story of his journey as a rural Bengali boy from boyhood to adolescence.

Author Humayun Azad dedicated this novel to his childhood's rural friends and compared the novel to Bibhutibhushan Bandyopadhyay's novel Pather Panchali.

== Plot summary ==
A boy named Jalkador lives in a village with his parents and siblings; he has one brother and one sister who are named Abju and Moyna respectively who are younger than Jalkador. Jalkador is from a rural farmer-family; his father is a farmer and Jalkador raises cattle and catches fish, does not go to school and speaks the local dialect of the Bengali language.

When monsoon comes, Jalkador observes a flood, the entire village is damaged by the flood, including his family's residence.

Jalkador watches canoe sprint and kabaddi in village; he takes part in reaping paddies. Jalkador has a friend whose name is Majid, Majid tutors Jalkador on how to smoke cigarette and they talk about circumcision, they see one another’s penis which are uncircumcised. Majid imparts knowledge to Jalkador about sexual intercourse between men and women.

In the last part of the novel, Jalkador feels sexual attraction watching milkmaid and female bede dancer, he faces nocturnal emission. He watches women bathing in pond semi-nude and feels eroticism, he masturbates under an itchytree where nobody comes; he is already a teenager during this time.

== Setting ==
This novel was set in the 1960s decade’s Bengali rural life of East Pakistan's Bikrampur, it is believed that the novel was set in the village called rarhikhal which was the ancestral village of the author Humayun Azad. At that time villages in East Pakistan had no electricity, nor had any system of good sanitation.

== Characters ==
- Jalkador - The main protagonist of the novel, a rural boy
- Abju and Moyna - Jalkador's siblings, junior to Jalkador
- Majid - Jalkador's friend
- Rokman - Jalkador's family's servant
- Malti - The milkmaid towards whom Jalkador feels sexual attraction
