= Pronominalization in Bengali =

1983 thesis about Bengali grammar by Humayun Azad

- Cover of the first edition
- Author: Humayun Azad
- Language: English
- Subject: Bengali grammar
- Genre: Doctoral
- Published: 1976 (doctoral thesis); 1983 (first edition); 2010 (last edition)
- Publisher: University of Dhaka (1983), Agamee Prakashani (2010)
- Publication place: Bangladesh
- Media type: Hardcover
- Pages: 314
- OCLC: 10737884
- Dewey Decimal: 491/.445
- LC Class: 83904030

Pronominalization in Bengali is a 1983 published version of a thesis about Bengali grammar written in English by Bangladeshi linguist Humayun Azad. The writing was started in 1976, during his doctoral in Edinburgh, Scotland. The book was initially published by the University of Dhaka in 1983, and in 2010 it was published by Agamee Prakashani, Dhaka.

This research was published under the author's birth name Humayun Kabir by the University of Edinburgh in 1976, after he changed his name to Humayun Azad in 1988, it was re-published under the new name. Scottish linguist Keith Brown was the supervisor of this doctoral thesis.

== Synopsis ==
This work is the first research into the syntax of pronouns in Standard Colloquial Bengali using a transformational generative model of syntax. Several models referred to as an adaptation from Noam Chomsky's Aspects of the Theory of Syntax (1965).
