= Alaukik Istimar =

Bengali poetry book by Humayun Azad

- Cover of Agamee Prakashani's 2020 publication
- Original title: অলৌকিক ইস্টিমার
- Language: Bengali
- Subject: Modernism
- Genre: Poetry
- Publisher: Khan Brothers and Co, Agamee Prakashani
- Publication date: January 1973 (first publication)
- Publication place: Bangladesh
- Media type: Print (hardcover)
- Pages: 72 (Agamee Prakashani's 2020 version)
- ISBN: 9789840419302
- OCLC: 31279647

Alaukik Istimar (Bengali: অলৌকিক ইস্টিমার, lit. 'Unearthly Steamer') is a book which consists of a collection of Bengali poems by Bangladeshi poet Humayun Azad. It was the first book of Azad which was published in January 1973 from Khan Brothers and Company, Dhaka. A reprint was published from Agamee Prakashani later. The poems in this book are based on Azad's personal life's emotions, personal life experiences, incidents and personal imaginations of his own life when he resided in Dhaka and Chittagong.

== Theme ==
The book consists of poems written by Humayun Azad when he was a Dhaka University student from 1964 to 1968 and also when he entered in his job life in 1969 in Chittagong College; also poems written in the early part of the 1970s decade, have been included in this book, almost all of the poems published in this book were written by Azad after completing his Dhaka University's student life. The poems of this book are mixed with Azad's personal emotions. The name of the book also comes from Azad's one of nostalgic childhood memories. Poems based on unrequited love are an important part of this book. Azad wrote the book, dedicating it to the days and nights he lived through from 1968 to 1972.

== Publication ==
Alaukik Istimar was published in January, 1973, it was the year when Azad went to Scotland for doing PhD in linguistics from University of Edinburgh. The book was first published by Khan Brothers and Co. (a printing press from Dhaka) but later it has been published from Agamee Prakashani.

In 1973, when the book was first published Azad was described as 'Bangladeshi young urban poet' by readers community.

== List of poems ==
There are 49 poems in this book.

- স্নানের জন্য (For Bathing)
- আত্মজৈবনিক, একুশ বছর বয়সে (Self story, at the age of 21)
- জননী (Progenitress)
- আমার সন্তান (My child)
- আমার কন্যার জন্য প্রার্থনা (Praying for my daughter)
- বৃষ্টি নামে (Rain falls)
- আর্টগ্যালারির সুন্দরীদের জন্য (For beautiful young women of art-gallery)
- নতুন সঙ্গিনীকে (Dedicated to the new partner)
- বঙ্গ উন্নয়ন ট্রাস্ট (Bengal development trust)
- অম্লান জল (Fresh water)
- ব্লাড ব্যাংক (Blood bank)
- টয়লেট (Toilet)
- রোদনের স্মৃতি (Memories of crying)
- বিরোধী দল (Anti-party)
- জ্যোৎস্নার অত্যাচার (Outrage of the moon)
- প্রেম-ভালোবাসা (Love-romance)
- আজ রাতে (Tonight)
- তোমার ক্ষমতা (Your power)
- বেহালা (Violin)
- হাত (Palm of hand)
- স্বপ্নলোকে লুটতরাজ (Looting in dreamland)
- জীবনচরিতাংশ (A slice of life)
- বাঘিনী (Tigress)
- রাত্রি (Night)
- অলৌকিক ইস্টিমার (Unearthly steamer)
- ছাদআরোহীর কাসিদা (The roof-top jumper)
- স্টেজ (Stage)
- শ্রেণীসংগ্রাম (Class struggle)
- আত্মহত্যার অস্ত্রাবলি (Weapons for suicide)
- যদি তুমি আসো (If you come)
- বাহু (Hand)
- তার করতাল (Her clapping)
- সব সাংবাদিক জানেন (Every journalist knows)
- অন্ধ ও বধির স্যান্ডেল (Blind and deaf sandal)
- বিবস্ত্র চাঁদ ('Unclothed' moon)
- যাচ্ছি (I am going)
- যদি মরে যাই (If I die)
- দু'দিন ধরে দেখা নেই (No meeting since two days)
- গৃহনির্মাণ (Making house)
- হরোস্কোপ (Horoscope)
- আমার ছাত্র ও তার প্রেমিকার জন্য এলেজি (My student and elegy for his lover)
- রেস্তোরাঁর পার্শ্ববর্তী টেবিলের তরুণের প্রতি (For the young man of side-table of the restaurant)
- চিত্রিত শহর (Drawn city)
- আমার গৃহ (My home)
- জনতা ও জান্টা (Population and junta)
- এ সভা প্রস্তাব করছে (This meeting is proposing)
- খোকনের সানগ্লাস (Khokon's sunglass)
- যাও রিকশা যাও (Go rickshaw go)
- হুমায়ুন আজাদ (Humayun Azad)
