= Sab Kichu Bhene Pare =

1995 Bengali novel by Bangladeshi author Humayun Azad

- Cover of eleventh edition
- Author: Humayun Azad
- Cover artist: Samar Majumder
- Language: Bengali
- Subject: Interpersonal relationship
- Genre: Novel
- Published: February 1995
- Publisher: Agamee Prakashani
- Publication place: Bangladesh
- Media type: Hardcover
- Pages: 144 (eleventh edition)
- ISBN: 9789844012646
- OCLC: 32891823
- LC Class: PK1730.12.J26 S23 1995
- Preceded by: Chappanno Hazar Borgomile (1994)
- Followed by: Manush Hishbe Amar Oporadhshomuho (1996)

Shôb Kichhu Bhenge Pôre (Bengali: সব কিছু ভেঙে পড়ে, English: Everything Falls Apart) is a 1995 Bengali novel written by Bangladeshi novelist Humayun Azad. It was first published in February 1995 by Agamee Prakashani in the Ekushey Book Fair from Dhaka, Bangladesh.

In this novel, Azad has published stories and sequences of physical and emotional relationships between men and women; which lead to various questions and often be seen in the conventional Bengali society. Considering the structural and point of view, it is a modern biographical novel in Bengali literature.

== Background ==
Through the context of the novel, family events emerge as a result of the emergence of the rural society of Bangladesh, as well as the social conditions of Bengal.

== Main characters ==
- Mahbub – Bridge engineer
- Feroza – Mahbub's wife
- Archy – Mahbub-Feroza couple's daughter
- Rowshon – Mahbub's childhood girlfriend
- Ananya – Mahbub's adult-life female friend (younger than Mahbub)

== Plot ==
The main theme of the novel is about the relationship between men and women, mainly the autobiography of a man named Mahbub. From the childhood of Mahbub to the description of various rural experiences in life, there is talk of male-female relationships; The boy Mahbub was curious to see a newly married woman bathing in the pond of Mollah's house very early in the morning; He once saw their work girl Kadban naked with his cousin (Hasan); As a teenager, he survived being sexually assaulted by two elderly men, once on a steamer and another by an unfamiliar railway worker, a girl named Raushan whom he saw naked in private and naked in front of himself; As various events unfolded, Mahbub grew up and made his debut as a Dhaka-based successful engineer who had a wife named Firoza and a young daughter named Archie; Mahbub does not love Firoza but marries her for social reasons, they were married by a guardian, Mahbub was able to befriend a young woman named Ananya even in his old age and also had sex with a female worker in his own office.
