= Dhaka International Book Fair =

Book fair in Dhaka, Bangladesh

Dhaka International Book Fair ঢাকা আন্তর্জাতিক বই মেলা
- Status: Active
- Genre: Book fair
- Frequency: Annual
- Locations: Dhaka, Bangladesh
- Inaugurated: 1995
- Organizer: National Book Centre

The Dhaka International Book Fair (Bengali: ঢাকা আন্তর্জাতিক বইমেলা), formerly the Dhaka Book Fair is a book fair held in Bangladesh's capital city Dhaka. It is one of the most prominent book fairs in Bangladesh, apart from the Ekushey Book Fair. Usually the fair is organised in every December. The location of the fair is not specific.

== History ==
The National Book Centre started the annual Dhaka Book Fair in 1995. It was held at various locations in the city, including the Physical Health Training College in Mohammadpur and the Bangladesh Shilpakala Academy.

The fair was re-titled the Dhaka International Book Fair in December 2008, when it was expanded to include foreign publishers and organizations. That year the venue was changed from Agargaon to the Dhaka University sports ground in anticipation of larger crowds. Only two foreign countries, India and Iran, participated the next year. The fair received only 4,000 to 5,000 daily visitors in 2010. Following several years of lackluster attendance, organizers suspended the event after the 2013 edition, which was held at Suhrawardy Udyan. Reasons suggested for the failure of the fair to catch on included the lack of a stable location, being scheduled too near in time to the more popular Ekushey Book Fair, the admission charge (the Ekushey Book Fair is free), and insufficient publicity.

== Details ==
A few publishing houses publish new books on the occasion of this fair. Commission is available in a certain amount (usually 25%) of the book.

Fair also has more seminars, concerts, new book clippings and various discussion programs. Tickets for the fair are available for the ticket, the ticket is to be purchased with the specified entry price. However, in the management of any institute, students can enter the group without any ticket.
