= Rashid Karim =

Bangladeshi novelist

- রশীদ করীম
- Born: 14 August 1925; Kolkata, Bengal Presidency, British India
- Died: 26 November 2011 (aged 86); Dhaka, Bangladesh
- Resting place: Martyred Intellectuals' Graveyard in Mirpur, Dhaka
- Relatives: Abu Rushd (brother)
- Writing career
- Language: Bengali
- Genres: Fiction, novel, essay
- Notable awards: full list

Rashid Karim (14 August 1925 – 26 November 2011) was a Bangladeshi novelist.

Karim completed a BA at Calcutta Islamia College. His family moved to Dhaka after the partition in 1947. He began writing at fourteen and published his first story in 1942. After a long break, Karim resumed writing in 1961, and his first novel, Uttam Purush, earned him the prestigious Adamjee Award. His fame peaked with the publication of his epic novel Amar Jato Glani (1973), and he continued to write and publish regularly thereafter. Karim battled paralysis for nineteen years and died in Dhaka on 26 November 2011.

== Early life and career ==
Karim was born in Kolkata, West Bengal, in 1925. He completed a BA at Calcutta Islamia College (now Maulana Azad College), an affiliated college of the University of Calcutta. After the partition of the sub-continent in 1947, his family moved to Dhaka.

Karim began writing during the British period, continued during the Pakistan period, but wrote his major novels during the Bangladesh period. It was in independent Bangladesh that his career as a writer reached its zenith. Karim penned his first story at the age of fourteen. So he began quite early. But his first story was published in 1942 in Mohammed Nasiruddin's Saogat. After that he did not write until 1961, when the second phase of his writing career began. His first novel, Uttam Purush, was published that year. It made him widely known and brought him the prestigious Adamjee Award. Two years later, Prashanna Pashan instantly turned him into a major novelist of the Bengali language. Again he went into hibernation, this time for a decade. After the liberation of Bangladesh in 1971, he published his epic novel, Amar Jato Glani, in 1973. This novel helped his fame reach its peak. Till this period he was known as a gifted writer who wrote less but wrote very well. But onward he wrote and published regularly. Prem Ekti Lal Golap was published in 1978.

Karim had battled paralysis for nineteen years before his death. He died at Ibrahim Cardiac Centre in Dhaka on 26 November 2011.

== Published works ==
=== Novels ===
- Uttam Purush (The Best Man, 1961)
- Prasanno Pashan (The Happy Stone, 1963)
- Amar Jato Glani (All My Fatigue, 1973)
- Prem Ekti Lal Golap (Love is a Red Rose, 1978)
- Sadharan Loker Kahini (A Tale of an Ordinary Man, 1982)
- Ekaler Rupkatha (A Fairy Tale of This Day, 1980)
- Sonar Pathar Bati (Gold Plated Cup of Stone)
- Mayer Kachhe Jachchi (A Journey to Mother)
- Chini Na (Unrecognized)
- Boroi Nissongo (So Lonely)
- Podotolay Rokto (Blood Underneath the Feet)
- Lunch-box (Lunchbox)

=== Short stories ===
- Prothom Prem (First Love): a single collection of scintillating short stories

=== Autobiography ===
- Jibon-moron (Life & Death, 1999)

== Critiques of his novels ==
Uttam Purush

Through the character of Shaker of Uttam Purush, the Muslim mind of the then Kolkata has been exposed. The Pakistan Movement, which was nourished wholeheartedly by all Muslim people for their identity, takes an upper hand in the novel. Shaker is the embodiment of all characteristics available in the Muslim society – not even the political and cultural attitude go beyond. He supports the Muslim League and is a great fan of Muhammad Ali Jinnah and eventually relinquishes a sort of detest against Mahatma Gandhi and other Hindu leaders, though he is in the belief that Pakistan would be a country irrespective of Hindus and Muslims. Possibly, for that very reason, the narrator ‘I’ of the novel speaks about himself at the outset: I am not an ideal man…. Not only for lack of power of character but the diversion of my mental attitude. The novel ends with Shaker's migration from Kolkata to Dhaka. In the novel, Karim has delineated the subconscious mind of the humans more acutely than the picture of the society and the compactness of the story.

Prasanno Pashan

The second novel of Karim, Prasanno Pashan received similar appraisal from the readers of Bangladesh. The story of this novel is also set in the city of Kolkata. The protagonist of this novel is Tishna, who is the narrator of the novel herself. The whole novel is related in the first person narrative as her personal accounts. Like his first novel, this second one of Karim's lacks the perfection to be a true picture of the then society. A very thin thread of Kolkata's Muslim society may be observed in the novel. Rather, the incidents of Tishna's early life are the main focus of the novel. The novelist has tried to portray the like-sketch of Tishna and the influence of the episode of her Chhotofufu (younger aunt) and Chotochacha (younger uncle) on her life. The other characters, like Alim and Karim, also play important roles in the plot of the novel. On the eve of her youth, Tishna not only sympathised with Kamil, but she also loved him: the proof of it is present in the end of the novel. We now understand that Tishna loved Kamil, but the social prejudices prevented her from reaching her love. Though Tishna is presented as the main character, her exposition comes through narration rather than action – she rarely participates in them; rather, she only watches. As a result, she fails to create any permanent impression on the reader's mind. On the other hand, Chhotofufu, Tishna's distant aunt Mayna, spans less in the novel but touches more deeply. The character of Kamil is also no better creation.

Amar Jato Glani

The plot of this novel spans from the partition of 1947 to 26 March 1971. The story is narrated, or, more appropriately ‘told’, by Erphan Chowdhury. The other characters inserted are Ayesha, Ayesha's husband Samad Saheb, Abid, Kohinur, Akkas, Nabi, and others. We observe intermingle of Erphan's personal experience in the socio-political milieu of the novel. In this novel, unlike the earlier two, Karim has been successful in the juxtaposition of psychoanalysis and external society. The successful use of stream of consciousness in the frame of the socio-political arena is really praiseworthy in Amar Jato Glani.

Prem Ekti Lal Golap

Prem Ekti Lal Golap (প্রেম একটি লাল গোলাপ) is the most prominent novels of Rashid Karim. It was first published in the 1977 Eid number of Bichitra. Later, the novel was published as a book. Its biggest accolade was the rare, page-long praise by legendary author Sunil Gangopadhyay in Desh magazine, which cemented its place in contemporary Bengali literature. Based on this novel, Bangladesh Television (BTV) also produced a drama with the same name. Renowned actor Piyush Bandopadhyay and actress Shampa Reza played the two main characters.

This is one the most successful novel of the contemporary Bengali novels, at that time Bangladesh. The novelist balances the character's outer behavior and subconscious thoughts at the same time. Karim's expression in this regard is more spontaneous in Prem Ekti Lal Golap. Commenting on this novel, Zillur Rahman Siddiqui, an eminent poet and critic of the country, said:

"He can visualise the great in the silly, the tiny movement of the soul can take a true picture in his pen and thus Rashid Karim has again proved that he is one of the greatest creative fiction writers of the country."

In general, it is profound that autobiographical elements are present in Karim's novels, since his novels sketch the middle-class people and their socio-political environment, which is his own. If we look into his swan song, Jibon Moron, we will find the presence of some similar incidents that the novelist himself experienced in his own life. He himself also went through an adolescent love affair with a girl whose name is not even exposed in the swan song. The marriage of the girl imprinted a great shock on his mind, and resultantly he gave up any sort of writing. Though the novelist has confessed that if this girl had not appeared in his life, he would never have been able to be a writer. Once upon a time he had relations with two girls, which is also a common subject in his novels. The shadows of this girl or their marriage are not very faint in Karim's novels also. The shifting of Karim's family to Dhaka from Kolkata is another significant autobiographical element that has taken up a large space in his novels.

== Literary style ==
Karim's novels explored modern individuals and themes related to love, identity, and human behavior in Bengali fiction. Writer Mofidul Haque stated that Karim was confident about his writing and wrote according to his beliefs.

== Awards ==
- Adamjee Literary Award (1969)
- Bangla Academy Literary Award (1972)
- Ekushey Padak (1984)
- Lekhika Sangha Award (1991)
