= Pak Sar Jamin Sad Bad =

2004 Bengali novel by Bangladeshi author Humayun Azad

Pak Sar Jomin Shad Bad
- Author: Humayun Azad
- Cover artist: Samar Majumdar
- Language: Bengali
- Subject: Religious fundamentalism
- Genre: Novel
- Publisher: Agamee Prakashani, Dhaka
- Publication date: 2004
- Publication place: Bangladesh
- Media type: Print (hardcover)
- ISBN: 984-401-769-6
- OCLC: 808109497
- Preceded by: 10,000 and one more rape! (2003)
- Followed by: Ekti Khuner Svapna (2004)

Pak Sar Jomin Shad Bad (Bengali: পাক সার জমিন সাদ বাদ 'Blessed be the Sacred Land') is a 2004 Bangladeshi Bengali novel, written by Humayun Azad. The novel is based on an imagined Islamic fundamentalist political party that wants to make Bangladesh a Sharia law based Islamic state.

This novel was deeply critical of Pakistan's Islamic fundamentalists and their Bangladeshi collaborators before the independence of Bangladesh in 1971.

== Title and synopsis ==
The book title is a reference to the national anthem of Pakistan written in heavily Persianized Urdu by the Pakistani poet Hafeez Jullundhri in 1952. The first stanza of the song is as follows:

Urdu lyrics	Transliteration	Translation
پاک سَرزَمِین شاد باد كِشوَرِ حَسِين شاد باد تُو نِشانِ عَزمِ عالی شان !اَرضِ پاکِستان مَرکَزِ یَقِین شاد باد	pāk sarzamīn šād bād kišwar-ē ḥasīn šād bād tū nišān-ē ʿazm-ē ʿālī šān arⱬ-ē Pākistān! markaz-ē yaqīn šād bād	Blessed be the sacred land Happy be the bounteous realm Thou symbol of high resolve O Land of Pakistan! Blessed be the citadel of faith

The main protagonist character of the novel is a member of a fictitious Islamist political party. The protagonist's views are expressed in his monologue, "We aren't alone. Our brothers all over the world are doing their work. If they fly a plane into a building somewhere, if cars crash into a hospital or a hotel, or if a bomb blast kills 300 people in some recreational center, then we know it's the work of our brothers; in other words, it is our work. This is Jihad."

The main male protagonist falls in love with a Hindu girl and later leaves the fundamentalist political party, he also leaves extremist ideology from his mentality.

== Controversy ==
Pak Sar Jamin Saad Baad, book was an indirect satirical criticism against the Bangladeshi Islamist far-right political party Bangladesh Jamaat-e-Islami. On 27 February 2004, Azad came under a vicious attack by unidentified assailants, it was assumed that the attackers were Islamic fundamentalists; Azad received threats after publishing this book in The Daily Ittefaq on 2003. The political party blamed by Azad in the book was titled as "Jama'-e-Jihad-e Islam Party", this party, its ideologies and activities written in the novel were believed to be a metaphor of Jamaat-e-Islami Bangladesh. Jamatul Mujahideen Bangladesh, a banned Islamist organization in the country, confessed to the Rapid Action Battalion (a law enforcement agency of Bangladesh government) in 2006 that Azad was attacked by their members, after some of the organization's leading members were arrested. After the attack, Azad was immediately taken to Combined Military Hospital (Dhaka) by the order of the then Prime Minister of Bangladesh Khaleda Zia.

In late July 2004, Azad wrote a moving letter to the Prime Minister of Bangladesh and other political leaders calling on them to restore freedom of speech in Bangladesh and pleading for protection to himself and his family. Azad died in August, 2004 in Germany following his recovery from ill-health, he died on the night of 11th of the month, the day he reached there.

== Criticism ==
Bangladeshi novelist, filmmaker and dramatist Humayun Ahmed called the book "so vulgar that anybody would be hurt after reading it. He doesn't have to be a fundamentalist."
