= Nasreen Jahan =

Bangladeshi writer (born 1966)

- নাসরীন জাহান
- Born: March 5, 1964 (age 62); Mymensingh, East Pakistan, Pakistan
- Occupation: Writer

Nasreen Jahan (born 05 March 1964) is a Bangladeshi writer and literary editor. She came to notice with the publication of her novel The Woman Who Flew: Urukku in 1993.

== Life ==
Jahan was born and brought up in Mymensingh. She joined the Chander Hat, a national children's and juvenile organization in 1974 and started to write rhymes and short stories in the children's page of daily newspaper Doinik Bangla. She was profusely encouraged by Literary Editor Late Ahsan Habib who was also a top-brass poet of Bangladesh. Later she concentrated on short stories and published in all leading literary papers and magazines of the country including the Kishore Bangla. She is married to poet Ashraf Ahmed and has the only daughter Orchi Otondrila.

Her novel Urukku, published in 1993, became a hit after it was awarded the Philips Literary Award in 1994. For a brief period in 1993–94, she worked for the Banglabazaar Patrika published for its weekly literary supplement. Since late 1990s, she has been working as the editor of the literature section of weekly Anyadin. She a feminist, who believes in women's freedom without disrespect for tradition and social norms.

== Literary style ==
Jahan has distinguished herself with her poetic prose and psychological approach to human behaviour. She is capable of handling intricate human mind with dexterity. She is prone to focus on man-woman relationship in the backdrop of social fabric and examine its intricacies. Jahan has candidly treated sex as a theme and went ahead of time by reflecting on homosexuality her short stories and novels. Her writing separately exhibits realism, surrealism, also magic realism. Her works are never erotic in nature.

== Works ==
=== Novels ===
- উড়ুক্কু Urukku 1993 The Woman Who Flew
- চন্দ্রের প্রথম কলা Chandrer Prothom Kola (The First Phase of the Moon, 1994)
- যখন চারপাশের বাতিগুলো নিভে আসছে Jakhan Charpasher Batiqulo Nive Ashchhe (When All Lamps Dim, 1995)
- চন্দ্রলেখার জাদুবিস্তার Chandralekhar Jaadubistar (Magical Exposition of Chandralekha, 1995)
- সোনালি মুখোশ Sonali Mukhosh (The Golden Mask, 1996)
- বৈদেহী Baidehi (The Incorporeal, 1997)
- লি Lii(Name, 1997)
- ক্রুশকাঠে কন্যা Krus Kathe Konya (The Daughter on the Cross, 1998)
- উড়ে যায় নিশিপক্ষি Ure Jai Nishipokshi (The Nocturnal Bird Flies Away, 1999)
- Megher Sonali Chule মেঘের সোনালি চুল [Golden-Haired Clouds] (in Bengali). Dhaka: Anyaprokash. 2000.
- Sargaloker Ghora স্বর্গলোকের ঘোড়া [The Heavenly Horse] (in Bengali). Dhaka: Anyaprokash. 2000.
- নিকুন্তিলা Nikuntila (Name, 2001)
- কমলাসুন্দরী আর এক সন্ধ্যার কাহিনী Komolashundory Ar Ek Shondhar Kahini (Kamalashundari and the Story of a dusk, 2002)
- শঙ্খনর্তকী Shonkhonortoki (Moving Venomous Snake, 2003)
- আকাশে অনেক রাত Akashe Onek Raat (High Gloom at the Sky, 2004)
- দূর পৃথিবীর গন্ধে Dur Prithibir Gondhe (In Sniff of Distant Earth, 2004)
- সামান্তা Samanta (Name, 2005)
- মৃত্যুসখীগণ Mrittushokheegon (confidantes Living Along with Death, 2006)
- ঈশ্বরের বামহাত Ishwarer Bamhat (Left-Hand of the Almighty, 2007)
- কুয়াশার ফণা Kuwashar Fona (Snake-hood of the Mist, 2008)
- আঁধারে রঙিন রাখাল Adhre Rongin Rakhal (Rakhal Colored by Darkness, 2009)
- চিল পাখির নীল ঠোঁটে Chil Pakhir Nil Thote (In Kite's Blue Lips, 2009)
- সেই সাপ জ্যান্ত Shei Shaap Janto (Those Serpents are Alive, 2010)

== Awards ==
- Bangla Academy Literary Award (1999)
