= Chhappanno Hajar Borgomail =

Bengali novel by Humayun Azad

- Author: Humayun Azad
- Cover artist: Samar Majumdar
- Language: Bengali
- Subject: Martial law in Bangladesh, 1982 Bangladesh coup d'état, Bangladeshi society
- Genre: Novel
- Set in: 1980's decade's Bangladesh
- Publisher: Agamee Prakashani
- Publication date: February 1994
- Publication place: Bangladesh
- Media type: Print (hardcover)
- Pages: 168
- ISBN: 978-9840417179
- OCLC: 60043495

Chhappanno Hajar Borgomail (Bengali: ছাপ্পান্নো হাজার বর্গমাইল, lit. 'Fifty six thousand square miles') is a 1994 Bangladeshi Bengali-language novel written by Bangladeshi author Humayun Azad. It was the first published novel written by the author. The novel was about 1980's decade's Bangladesh when the country faced social changes during Hussain Muhammad Ershad's rule. The main protagonist character of this novel is Rashed who teaches in Dhaka University; the character is believed to be inspired from Humayun Azad's own character who hated military rule, dictatorial governance and religious fundamentalism. Humayun Azad metaphorically indicated Hussain Muhammad Ershad by creating the fictitious character 'General Uddin Mohammad'. The basic story of the novel is based on Humayun Azad's own experiences. The novel is considered one of the major works of Humayun Azad. Azad dedicated the novel to the lead character of this novel - Rashed, which is also the nickname of his father.

== Plot summary ==
The novel starts with Rashed's only daughter Mridu's school going incident; the girl faces problem when army troops stop her in road from going to school. Rashed's wife name is Mumtaz who listens radio announcement that martial law has been imposed all over the country. Later Rashed watches television with her daughter that the army general Uddin Mohammad has come into state power.

Rashed later imagines his childhood life when Bangladesh was part of Pakistan and in 1958 when General Ayub Khan imposed martial law.

Social changes come in Bangladesh after General Uddin Mohammad imposes martial law; Rashed observes that society is becoming more conservative, girls and women are losing their freedom and also the society is becoming religious gradually.

== Characters ==
- Rashed - The main protagonist of the novel, teaches in Dhaka University
- Mumtaz - Rashed's wife
- Mridu - Rashed's daughter
- Abdel - Notorious rich businessman
- Uddin Mohammad - The general who imposes martial law
- Lily - A young woman who is a television host
- Selima - A highly educated woman who becomes religious
