= Abu Rushd =

Bangladeshi writer

- আবু রুশদ
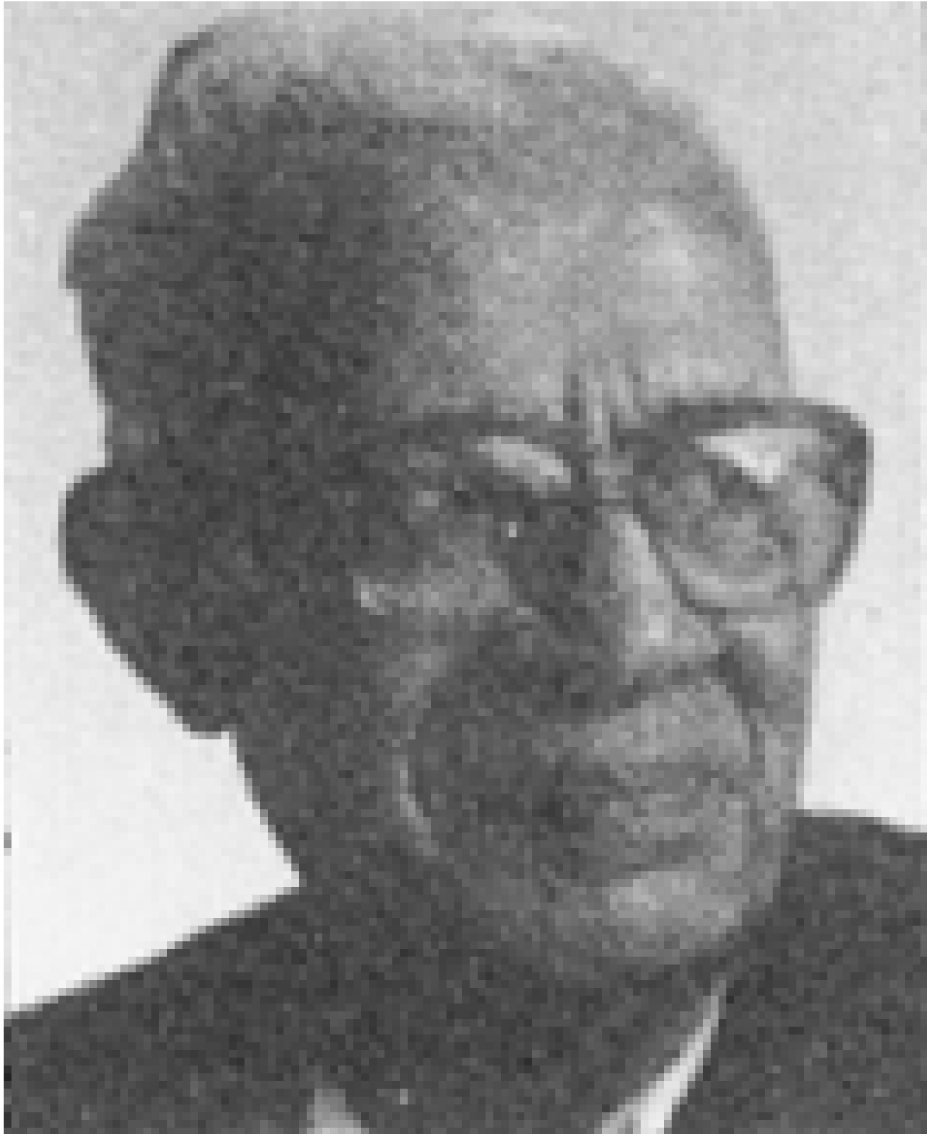
- Born: Syed Abu Rushd Matinuddin; 25 December 1919; Calcutta, Bengal Presidency, British India
- Died: 23 February 2010 (aged 90)
- Education: Exeter College, Oxford
- Relatives: Rashid Karim (brother)
- Awards: full list

Syed Abu Rushd Matinuddin (known by his pen name Abu Rushd, 25 December 1919 – 23 February 2010) was a Bangladeshi writer.

== Early life and career ==
Abu Rushd started his career as an English lecturer in Hooghly Mohsin College. He moved to England in 1951 for studying English literature at the Exeter College, Oxford. He later taught English in Kolkata Islamia College, Dhaka College, Chittagong College, Rajshahi College and Jahangirnagar University. He retired from Jahangirnagar University in 1982.

== Works ==
Abu Rushd's first publication was a collection of short stories in 1939. In addition to six novels, he wrote 50 short stories, and a three-volume autobiography. He also translated literary works, both from Bengali to English and English to Bengali, including Shakespeare's poetic works. He was a regular columnist for four Bangladeshi newspapers, writing opinion pieces.

Abu Rushd translated some poetic works of Lalon into English in 1964.

=== Novels ===
- Elomelo (This and That, 1946)
- Samne Notun Din (A New Day Ahead, 1951)
- Doba Holo Dighi (Pool becomes Lake, 1960)
- Nongor (Anchor, 1967)
- Onishchito Ragini (The Unsure Tune, 1969)
- Sthagita Dwip (The Aborted Island, 1974)

== Awards ==
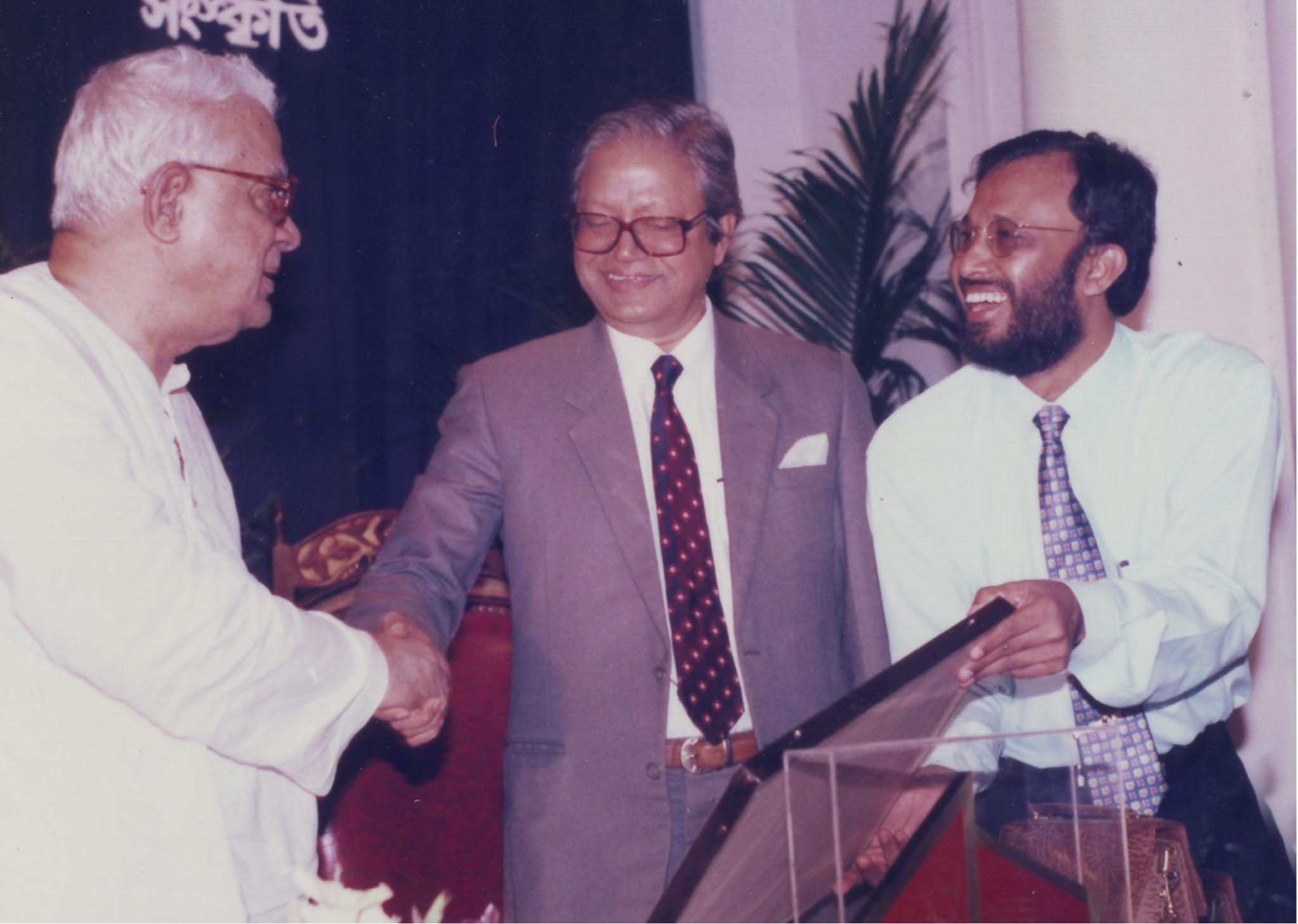
Abu Rushd receiving an award in 1999

- Tamgha-e-Imtiaz (1963)
- Bangla Academy Literary Award (1963)
- Habib Bank Award (1970)
- Ekushey Padak (1981)
- Adamjee Literary Award
- Nasiruddin Gold Medal (1992)
- Alakta Literary Award (1992)
- Bangla Sahitya Parisad Award (1993)
- Sher-e-Bangla Gold Award (1992)
- Lekhika Sangha Award (1992)
- Rotary Club Award (1995)
- Chattagram Sangskriti Kendro Farrukh Memorial Award (1999)

== Personal life ==
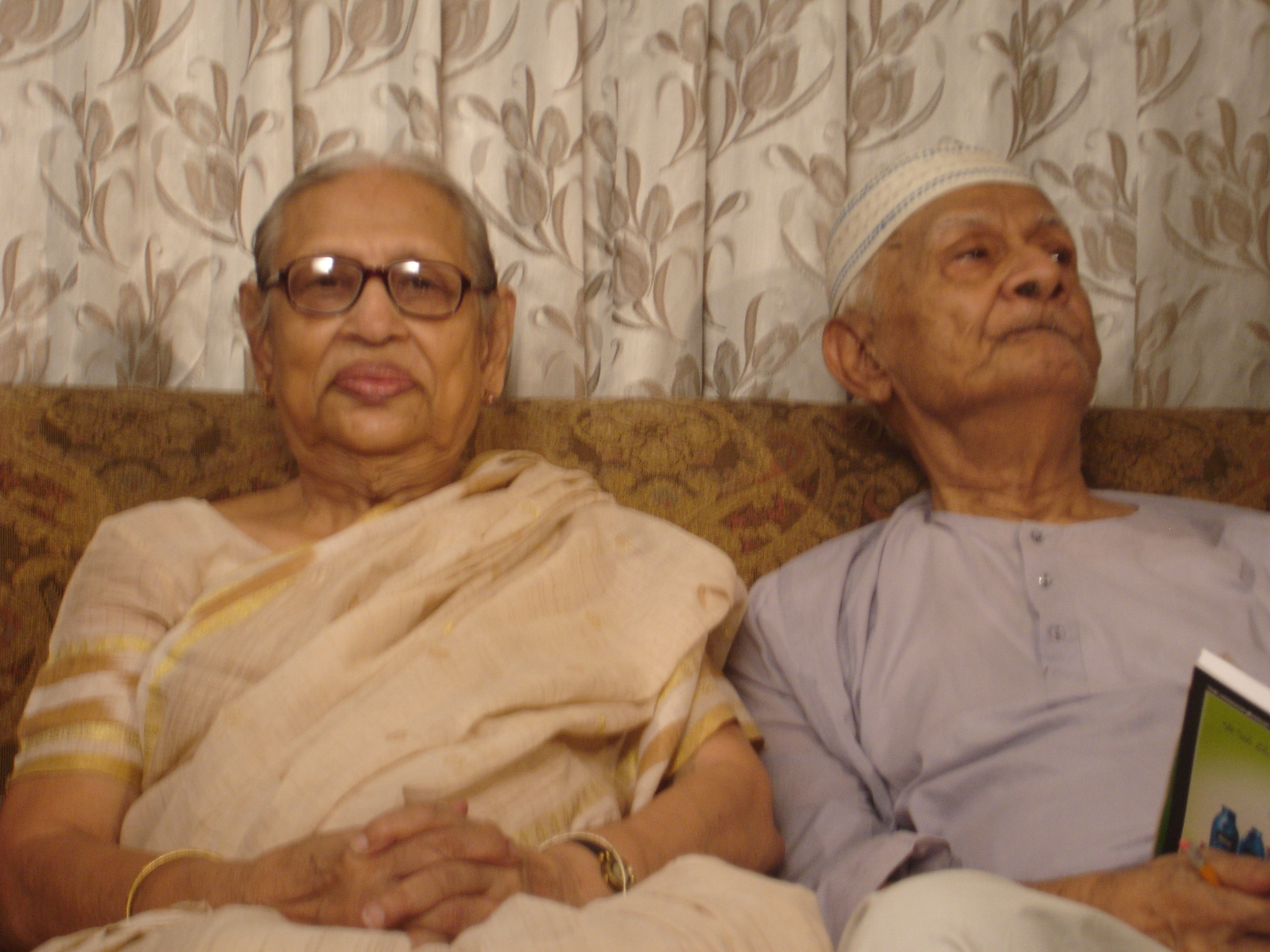
Abu Rushd and his wife in 2000

Abu Rush was married to Azija Rushd. His brother, Rashid Karim, was a novelist.
