= Daulatunnessa Khatun =

Indian politician

Member of East Bengal Legislative Assembly

Daulatunnessa Khatun (Bengali: দৌলতুন্নেছা খাতুন; 1918–1997) was a Bengali politician, social activist, feminist and former Member of East Bengal Legislative Assembly.

== Early life ==
Khatun was born in 1918 in Sonatala, Bogra, East Bengal, British Raj. She was married to Hafizur Rahman, a doctor, when she was 8 years old. She studied till she was 12 at Dhaka Eden High School. She continued her education in her husband's house despite social pressures against women's education.

== Career ==
In 1930, at the age of 12, she joined the Gandhi's Civil disobedience movement. She formed Gaibandha Mahila Samiti' (Gaibandha Women's Association) with like minded women in Gaibandha. She was one of the few Muslim women activist who participated in the movement, organising women's meetings and rallies. She studied until finishing her Undergraduate. She and her husband were forced to leave their home in Gaibandha because of her activism.

She was arrested by the British Raj. During the 1943 Bengal Famine she founded an orphanage. After the partition of India she settled in Dhaka. She was elected to the East Bengal Legislative Assembly in 1954, through active voting of women. In 1956 she was part of an official delegation of Pakistan to China.

== Death ==
She died in 1997 in Gaibandha, Bangladesh.
