= Ekushey Book Fair =

Annual book fair in Dhaka, Bangladesh

Amar Ekushey Book Fair অমর একুশে গ্রন্থমেলা
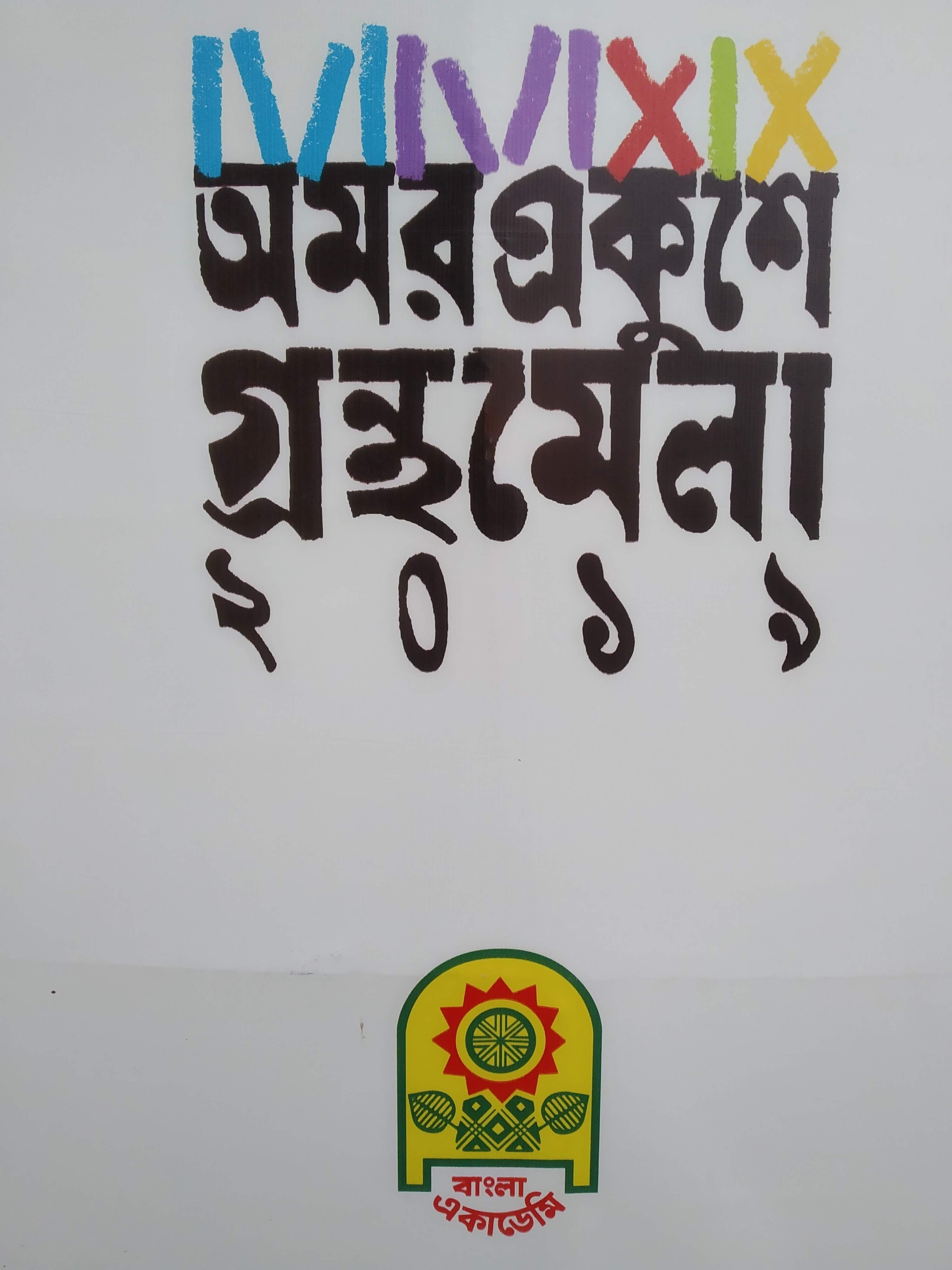
- Official logo of Amar Ekushey Book Fair 2019
- Status: Active
- Genre: Multi-genre
- Begins: 1 February, every year
- Ends: 28 February or 29 February (leap year), sometime extend to 1st week of March
- Frequency: Annually
- Venue: Bangla Academy Courtyard, Adjunct Suhrawardy Udyan
- Location: Dhaka
- Country: Bangladesh
- Inaugurated: 1979
- Attendance: Over 1 million every year
- Organizer: Bangla Academy
- Website: banglaacademy.gov.bd

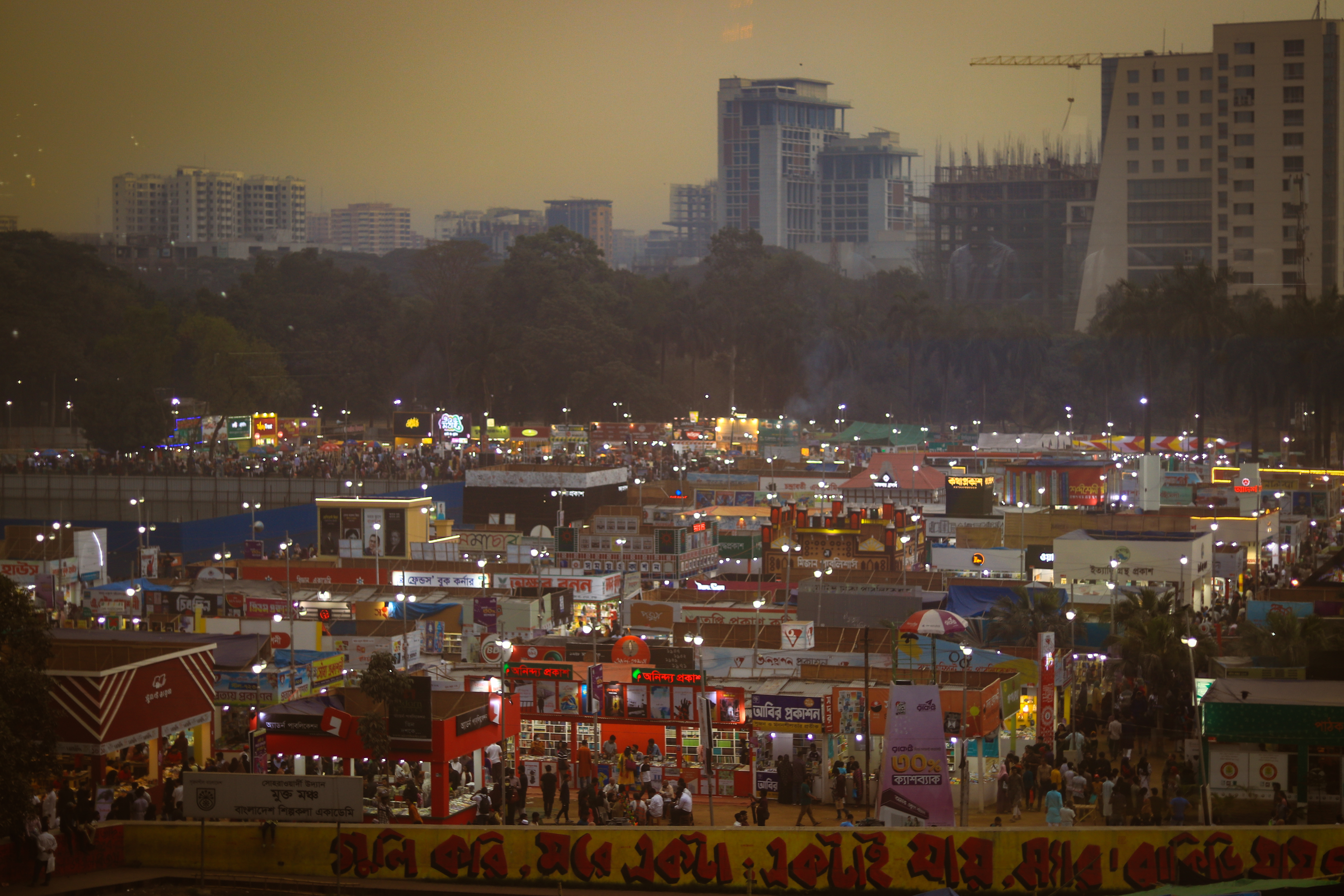
Stalls of the 2025 Ekushey Book Fair

The Ekushey Book Fair, (Note: Bengali: একুশে বই মেলা, romanized: Ēkuśē Bôi Mēlā, pronounced [ˈekuʃe boɪ ˈmɛla], lit. 'Book Fair of the Twenty-first [of February]') officially called the Amar Ekushey Book Fair, (Note: Bengali: অমর একুশে গ্রন্থমেলা, romanized: Ômôr Ēkuśē Grônthômēlā, lit. 'Eternal Book Fair of the Twenty-first [of February]') is the largest book fair in Bangladesh. Organized annually in February by Bangla Academy in Dhaka, the month-long event is free to all. In 2024, the fair attracted six million visitors and generated a record ৳600 million (US$4.9 million) in book sales.

Named after the colloquial Bengali name for International Mother Language Day (Language Movement Day) or Ekushey (একুশে, Ēkuśē), (Note: Ellipsis of একুশে ফেব্রুয়ারি, Ēkuśē Fēbruāri; lit. 'Twenty-first of February') the event commemorates those who died on 21 February 1952 during the Bengali language movement, which sought to establish Bengali as the state languages of former East Pakistan.

== Structure ==
Usually, the fair continues from 1 to 28 February. It takes place on Bangla Academy premises and at Suhrawardi Udyan. The Ministry of Culture is in control of the fair while the academy does the groundwork. Usually the Prime Minister (or the Chief Adviser in case of caretaker government) inaugurates the fair. Between 300 and 400 publishing houses take part in the fair. Only those Bangladeshi publishers who have at least 25 books of their own can join.

There is Nazrul Moncho, a corner dedicated to poet Kazi Nazrul Islam, a fixed place for month-long cultural meetings, a Lekhok Kunjo, a dedicated place for writers and, a media center for the journalists. Free WiFi service has been available for the fair since 2019.

== History ==
=== Background ===
On 21 February 1972, Chittaranjan Saha, owner of Muktadhara publishing house started a one-day sale of about 33 books on a mat on Bangla Academy premises on Language Movement Day. In 1974, Muktodhara established its very first stall, which measured 8 by 8 feet. By the next year, four to five stalls were set up by different publishers, and books were being sold unofficially. The number of visitors increased gradually each year, leading Bangla Academy to officially take charge of the fair in 1978. In 1979, a book fair was held in the Bangla Academy courtyard in collaboration with the Bangladesh Publishers and Booksellers Association. In 1984, the first official Amar Ekushey Grontho Mela was held under formal guidelines.

In the initial years, the book fair lasted a week, from 15 to 21 February. Later, the duration was extended to 21 days, from 1 to 21 February. As the fair gained wider acceptance, it was further extended to span the entire month of February.

Although Saha is acknowledged as the founder of the Ekushey Book Fair, the history of the book fair extends further back. In 1965, Sardar Jayenuddin displayed some children's books on the ground floor of Dhaka University's library, marking the first book fair in East Pakistan. In 1970, he organised another book fair in Narayanganj, and finally, in 1972, he arranged the fair inside the Bangla Academy premises. Notably, in 1995, another book fair called Dhaka International Book Fair was initiated by the government, which was discontinued in 2010.

In addition to book sales, Bangla Academy organizes literary and cultural events. Thousands of people gather to purchase books and spend time with the company of books and their authors. Publishers of Bangladesh take year-long preparation to publish a huge number of books during this month. Given the importance, generally head of the government inaugurates the fair on the first day of February. TV stations live broadcast the inaugural ceremony.

=== 2004 ===
On 27 February 2004, author and professor Humayun Azad was attacked and fatally injured by members of the militant group Jama'atul Mujahideen Bangladesh as he was leaving the book fair. The attackers also detonated bombs in the area.

=== 2008 ===
2008 Ekushey Book Fair was held from 1 to 29 February 2008. As many as 288 publishers participated. A record number of books were published on the occasion. According to official statistics, the number of books published in connection with the book fair was 2578. The sale proceeds from books sold shot up to a record of ৳200 million. Although the fair is a free-for-all event, there was a brief consideration to introduce entry tickets this year.

=== 2014 ===
In 2014, the book fair was extended to the nearby Suhrawardy Udyan, in addition to Bangla Academy, due to the increasing number of publishers.

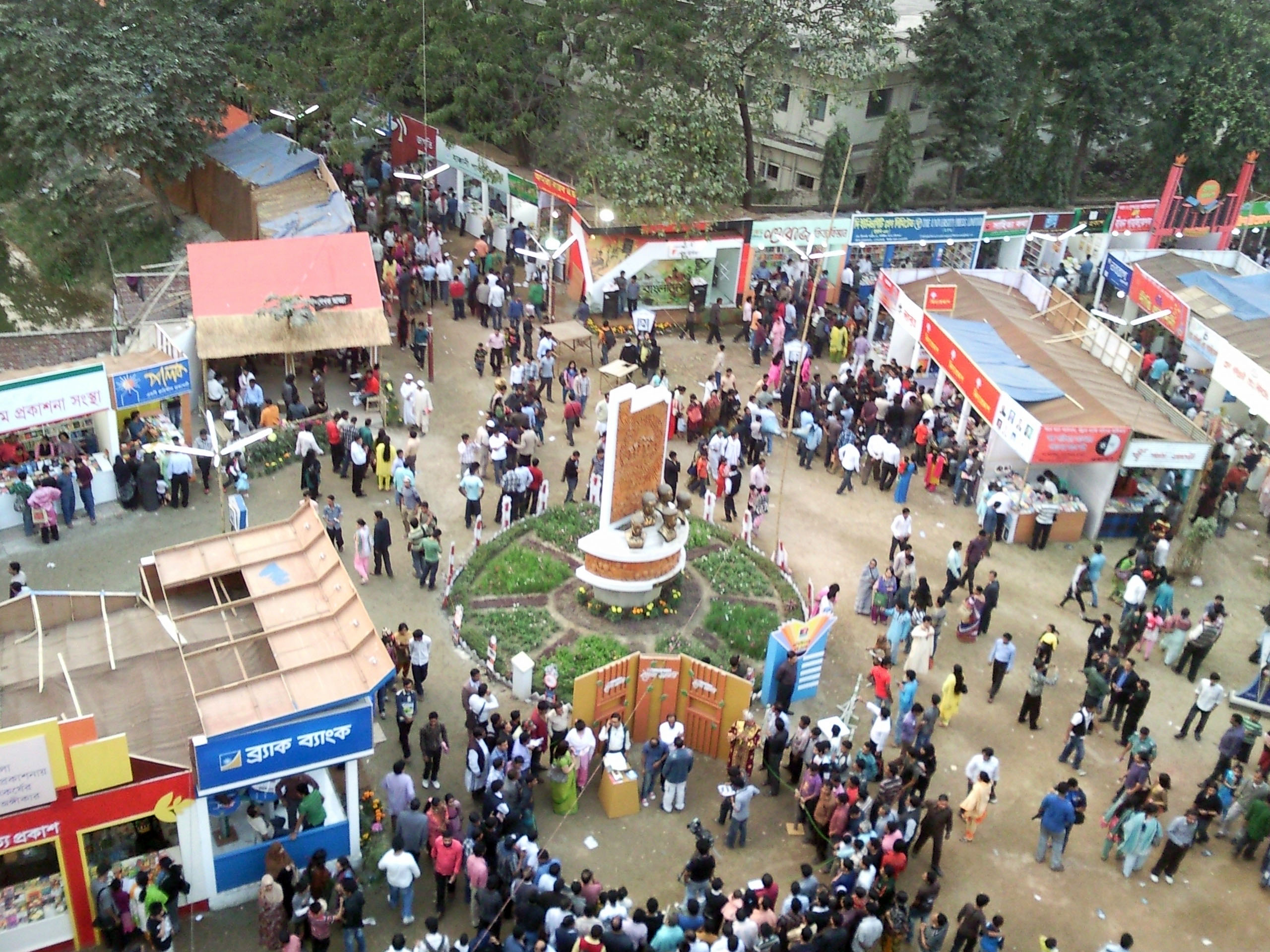
Ekushey Book Fair ground as seen in 2014

=== 2021 ===
2021 Ekushey Book Fair faced a COVID-19 related crisis. The book fair was shifted in March instead of February. But the attendance was very low and a lot of publishers didn't participate in the fair. The fair was also shortened.

=== 2022 ===
A sudden spike in the COVID-19 cases put the risk of organizing 2022 Ekushey Book Fair. With strict mask-wearing policy, the Boi Mela was organized and was much more successful compared to the previous year. Ekushey Book Fair started on 15 February in 2022, instead of 1 February and extended till 17 March.

=== 2024 ===
The 2024 book fair was extended until 2 March. Books worth a record ৳600 million (US$4.9 million) were sold, and the fair was visited by 5.9 million people. A total of 3,751 new books were published during the fair, which was dominated by fiction. The organisers allotted 937 stalls to 635 organisations. The book fair's closing ceremony included a prize-giving event.

=== 2025 ===
The 2025 Book Fair was inaugurated on 1 February by Bangladesh's Chief Adviser, Dr. Muhammad Yunus. The theme for this year's fair was "July Mass Uprising: Building a New Bangladesh." A total of 708 institutions participated at Bangla Academy and Suhrawardy Udyan, with 1,084 stall units allocated—an increase from the previous year. The fair featured 3,299 new books. The closing ceremony took place on the Bangla Academy premises in the afternoon on the final day of the event. On 10 February 2025 a Sabyasachi Prokashoni stall was attacked by Towhidi Janata for 'allegedly' selling Islamaphobic books of exiled Taslima Nasrin. The stall was forced to close after the incident. The chief advisor of 2025 caretaker government told in his official twitter post that the government is looking into this, but no further developments were made.

In February 2025, two Stay-Safe stalls at the Amar Ekushey Book Fair were shut down after objections to their display of sanitary napkins. Certain groups labeled them a "private product," prompting the event organizers, Dreamer Donkey, to request their removal, citing security concerns. The Bangla Academy defended the closure, stating that only books were allowed for sale, though Stay-Safe clarified that the napkins were distributed for free. The incident sparked debate on menstrual health awareness and public perception.

== See also ==
- Dhaka International Book Fair
