= Chittaranjan Saha =

- Born: 1 January 1927; Noakhali District, Bengal Presidency, British India
- Died: 26 December 2007 (aged 80); Dhaka, Bangladesh
- Awards: Ekushey Padak (2005)

Chittaranjan Saha (1 January 1927 – 26 December 2007) was a Bangladeshi educationist. He was awarded Ekushey Padak in 2005 by the Government of Bangladesh.

== Early life and education ==
Saha was born to Koilas Chandra Saha and Tirthabasi Saha in Latifur village, present-day Begumganj Upazila in Noakhali. He passed the matriculation exam from Ramendra High School in 1943 and the intermediate exam from Bangabasi College in 1946. Then he obtained a BA degree from Chaumohani College in 1948.

== Awards ==
- Ekushey Padak (2005)
- Vidyasagar Puraskar (2005)
- Natyasabha Puraskar (1988)
