= Humayun Azad =

Bangladeshi poet and author (1947 – 2004)

- হুমায়ুন আজাদ
- Pronunciation: [humai̯un ad͡ʒad̪]
- Born: Humayun Kabir; 28 April 1947; Bikrampur, Bengal, British India (now Munshiganj District, Bangladesh)
- Died: 12 August 2004 (aged 57); Munich, Bavaria, Germany
- Resting place: Munshiganj District
- Education: Dhaka College (HSC), University of Dhaka (BA, MA); University of Edinburgh (PhD)
- Occupations: Poet; Novelist; Linguist; Critic; Columnist; Professor
- Spouse: Latifa Kohinoor (m. 1975)
- Writing career
- Language: Bengali, English
- Notable works: Laal Neel Deepabali; Alaukik Istimar; Chhappanno Hajar Borgomail; Nijer Shonge Nijer Jiboner Modhu
- Notable awards: Bangla Academy Literary Award; Ekushey Padak

Humayun Azad (Note: Bengali: [humai̯un ad͡ʒad̪].) (Bengali: হুমায়ুন আজাদ, pronounced [humai̯un ad͡ʒad̪]; 28 April 1947 – 12 August 2004) was a Bangladeshi poet, novelist, short-story writer, essayist, linguist, columnist and professor of Dhaka University. He wrote more than 70 titles. He was awarded the Bangla Academy Literary Award in 1986 for his contributions to Bengali linguistics. In 2012, the government of Bangladesh honored him with Ekushey Padak posthumously for his contributions to Bengali literature.

== Early life and education ==
Azad was born as Humayun Kabir on 28 April 1947 in Rarhikhal village in Bikrampur which village is now under the Sreenagar sub-district of Munshiganj district. Notable scientist Jagadish Chandra Bose was born in the same village. He passed the secondary examination from Sir Jagadish Chandra Basu Institute in 1962 and higher secondary examination from Dhaka College in 1964. He earned BA and MA degrees in Bengali language and literature from the University of Dhaka in 1967 and 1968 respectively. He obtained his PhD in linguistics submitting his thesis titled "Pronominalization in Bengali" from the University of Edinburgh in 1976. Azad changed his surname from Kabir to Azad on 28 September 1988 by the magistrate of Narayanganj District.

== Career ==
Azad started his career as a teacher in 1969 by joining the Chittagong College. He joined the University of Chittagong as a lecturer on 11 February 1970 and Jahangirnagar University in December. He was appointed as an associate professor of Bengali at the University of Dhaka on 1 November 1978 and got promoted to the post of professor in 1986.

== Literary works ==
Azad's first collection of poems, written between 1968 and 1972, was published as Alaukik Istimar (lit. 'Unearthly steamer') in 1973, in which year he went to Scotland for studying Ph.D. in linguistics from University of Edinburgh. He wrote a short story in 1979 called Onoboroto Tusharpat (lit. 'Heavy snowing') which was inspired from his newly-wed life with his Dhaka University class-mate Latifa Kohinoor. In Britain one day, Azad was driving a car with his wife during heavy snowfall which became the main plot of the short story; so many years later Azad included this short-story in his 1996 book Jadukorer Mrityu (lit. 'Death of the magician') which book is the collection of his own-written five short-stories.

Towards the end of the 1980s, he started to write newspaper column focusing on contemporary sociopolitical issues. His commentaries continued throughout the 1990s and were later published as books as they grew in numbers. Through his writings of the 1990s and early 2000s he established himself as a novelist.

In 1992, Azad published the first comprehensive feminist book in Bengali titled Naree (English: Woman). Naree received both positive and negative reviews as a treatise, it was considered the first full-fledged feminist book after the independence of Bangladesh. In this work Azad mentioned the pro-women contributions of the British Raj's two famous Bengali socio-political reformers: Raja Rammohan Roy and Ishwar Chandra Vidyasagar, he criticized Rabindranath Tagore, a famous Bengali poet and Nobel laureate, and Bankim Chandra Chatterjee, a famous Bengali novelist of the 19th century. The work, critical of the patriarchal and male-chauvinistic attitude of society towards women, attracted negative reactions from many Bangladeshi readers. The government of Bangladesh banned the book in 1995. The ban was eventually lifted in 2000, following a legal battle that Azad won in the High Court of the country.

In the year of 1994 he published his first novel which was titled as Chhappanno Hajar Borgomail (lit. 'Fifty-six thousand square-miles, the area of Bangladesh'); the novel was about military rule in Bangladesh in 1980s decade. He got special recognition for his second novel Sab Kichu Bhene Pare (1995) which was based on interpersonal relationship of Bangladeshi society. He wrote Ekti Khuner Svapna (lit. 'Dreaming of a murder'), an unrequited love-based novel where the main male protagonist lives in Salimullah Muslim Hall of Dhaka University where Azad lived during his student life, it was Azad's last novel published in 2004 in which year he died. Other important novels are Kobi Othoba Dondito Aupurush (lit. 'The poet or the condemned eunuch') and Nijer Shonge Nijer Jiboner Modhu (lit. 'The honey of one's life with himself'), the first was based on a fictitious late 20th century Bangladeshi male poet's life who is castrated after involving in live-in relationship with a much younger woman and the latter was inspired by Humayun Azad's own rural life when he was a teen-aged boy. Another noted novel written by Azad was Fali Fali Kore Kata Chand (lit. 'The moon sliced into pieces'), where the main female protagonist character Shirin is an educated young woman with individualism, she engages in adultery, leaves her husband and lives alone in a separate house.

Azad also wrote teen-age literature, among them, the discourse-book Laal Neel Deepabali is noted, this book was written for teen-aged boys and girls as Azad's aim was to teach Bangladeshi adolescent boys and girls about the history of Bengali literature in short.

== Assassination attempt ==
On 27 February 2004, near the campus of the University of Dhaka during the annual Bangla Academy book fair, two assailants, armed with chopper machetes, hacked Azad several times on the jaw, lower part of the neck and hands. Azad was taken to the nearby Dhaka Medical College and Hospital. By the order of the then Prime Minister of Bangladesh Khaleda Zia, Azad was immediately sent to the Combined Military Hospital (CMH), Dhaka for better treatment and later to Bumrungrad International Hospital in Thailand where he recovered.

Azad had been fearing for his life ever since excerpts of his novel, Pak Sar Jamin Sad Bad (lit. 'Pakistan's national anthem; Be Blessed the Sacred Land') were first published in The Daily Ittefaq Newspaper's Eid supplement in 2003. In that novel, he indecorously criticised the political ideologies of the Islamic extremists of Bangladesh. After that book had been published, he started receiving various threats from the Islamist fundamentalists.

A week prior to Azad's assault, Delwar Hossain Sayeedi, one of the members of parliament of Bangladesh said in the parliament, that Azad's political satire Pak Sar Jamin Sad Bad must be banned; he also wanted infliction of the blasphemy law of Bangladesh for this kind of book. In 2006, one of the leaders of the fundamentalist organization Jama'atul Mujahideen Bangladesh (JMB) admitted to the RAB interrogators that his operatives carried out the attack on writer Azad, as well as two other murders, bomb blasts, and 2002 attacks on cinemas.

== Death ==
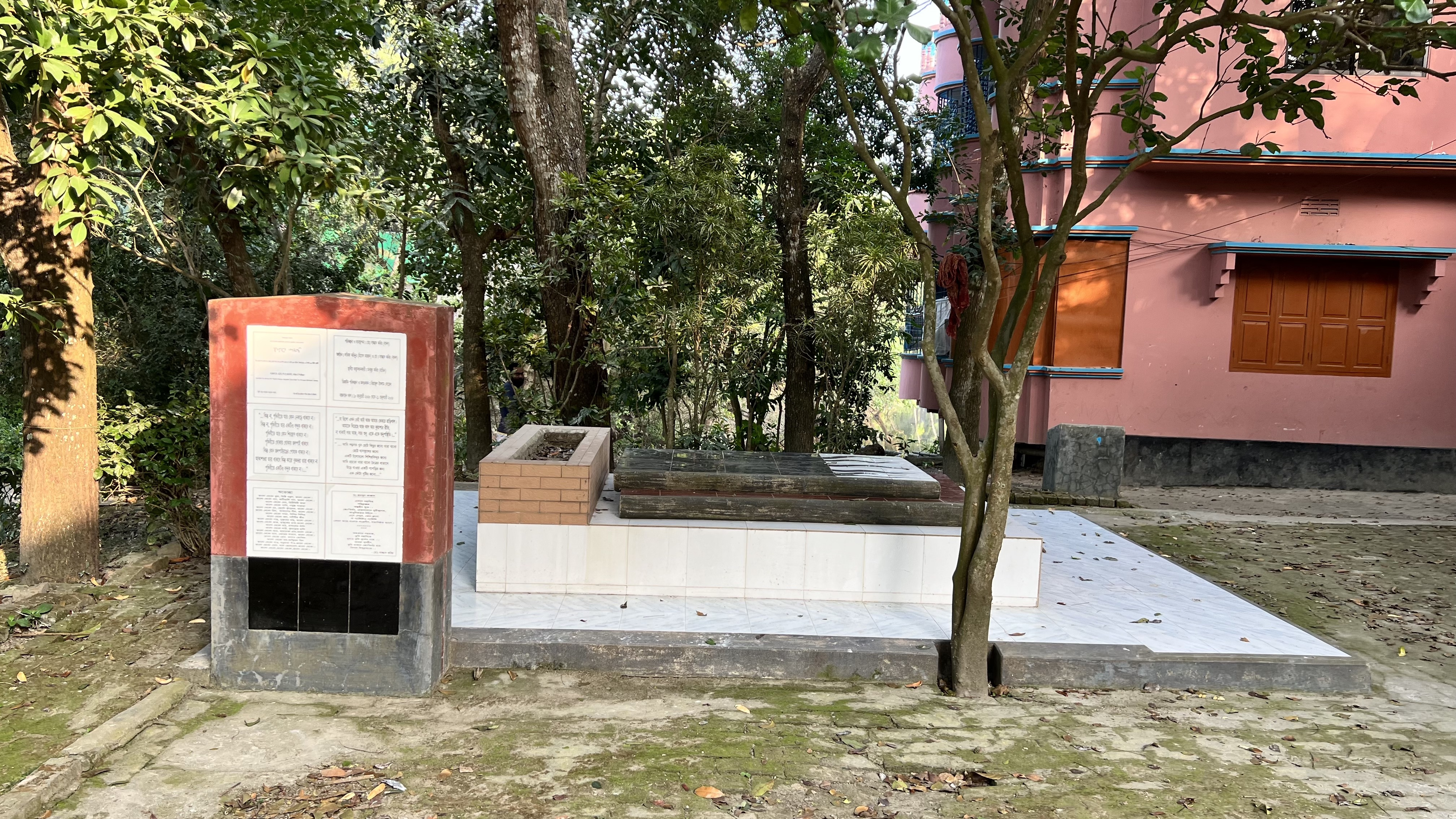
Grave of Azad at Humayun Azad Complex in Rarhikhal village

On 12 August 2004, Azad was found dead in his apartment in Munich, Germany, where he had arrived a week earlier to conduct research on the nineteenth century German romantic poet Heinrich Heine, several months after the extremists' machete attack on him at a book fair, which had left him grievously injured. His family demanded an investigation, alleging that the extremists who had attempted the earlier assassination had a role in this death. While alive, Azad had expressed his wish to donate his body to medical college after his death. Instead he was buried in Rarhikhal, his village home in Bangladesh, as doctors declined to take his body for medical research, as several days had passed for his body to reach Bangladesh from Germany. The first death anniversary of Azad was observed with respect in Rarhikhal village on Friday, the 12 August 2005.

== Personal life ==
Azad met his future wife Latifa Kohinoor in 1968 during his M.A. studies at the University of Dhaka. They married on 12 October 1975. Together they had two daughters, Smita and Mauli, and one son, Anannya. Kohinoor died from cancer on 5 September 2024 in Dhaka.

== Bibliography ==
=== Notable books ===
- Alaukik Istimar, collection of poems (1973)
- Pronominalization in Bengali (1983)
- Naree, treatise on feminism (1992)
- Chhappanno Hajar Borgomail, (1994), novel on martial law in Bangladesh
- Sab Kichu Bhene Pare (1995)
- Nijer Shonge Nijer Jiboner Modhu (2000)
- Pak Sar Jamin Sad Bad (2004)
