= Agamee Prakashani =

Book publisher from Dhaka, Bangladesh

Agamee Prakashani আগামী প্রকাশনী
- Status: Active
- Founded: 1986; 40 years ago
- Founder: Osman Gani
- Country of origin: Bangladesh
- Headquarters location: 36 Bangla Bazar, Dhaka
- Distribution: Bangladesh, India, UK, United States
- Key people: Osman Gani
- Publication types: Books
- Fiction genres: Prose, novels, poetry, stories
- Official website: agameeprakashani-bd.com

Agamee Prakashani (Bengali: আগামী প্রকাশনী) is a Bangladeshi publishing house located in Dhaka.

== History ==
Agamee Prakashani was founded in 1986 by Osman Gani. It was based in Banglabazar which housed a large number of publishing houses. As of 2015, it has more than 2000 publications in both Bengali and English.

Agamee Prakashani has published 80 books on Sheikh Mujibur Rahman and 200 books on Bangladesh Liberation War. It has published 70 books of Humayun Azad despite threats from Islamists.

== Awards ==
Agamee Prakashani has won several awards, including:

- Bangla Academy Award
- Shaheed Munier Choudhury Memorial Award
- National Book Centre Best Publishers Award
- Bangladesh Publishers & Book-Sellers Association Award

== Gallery ==
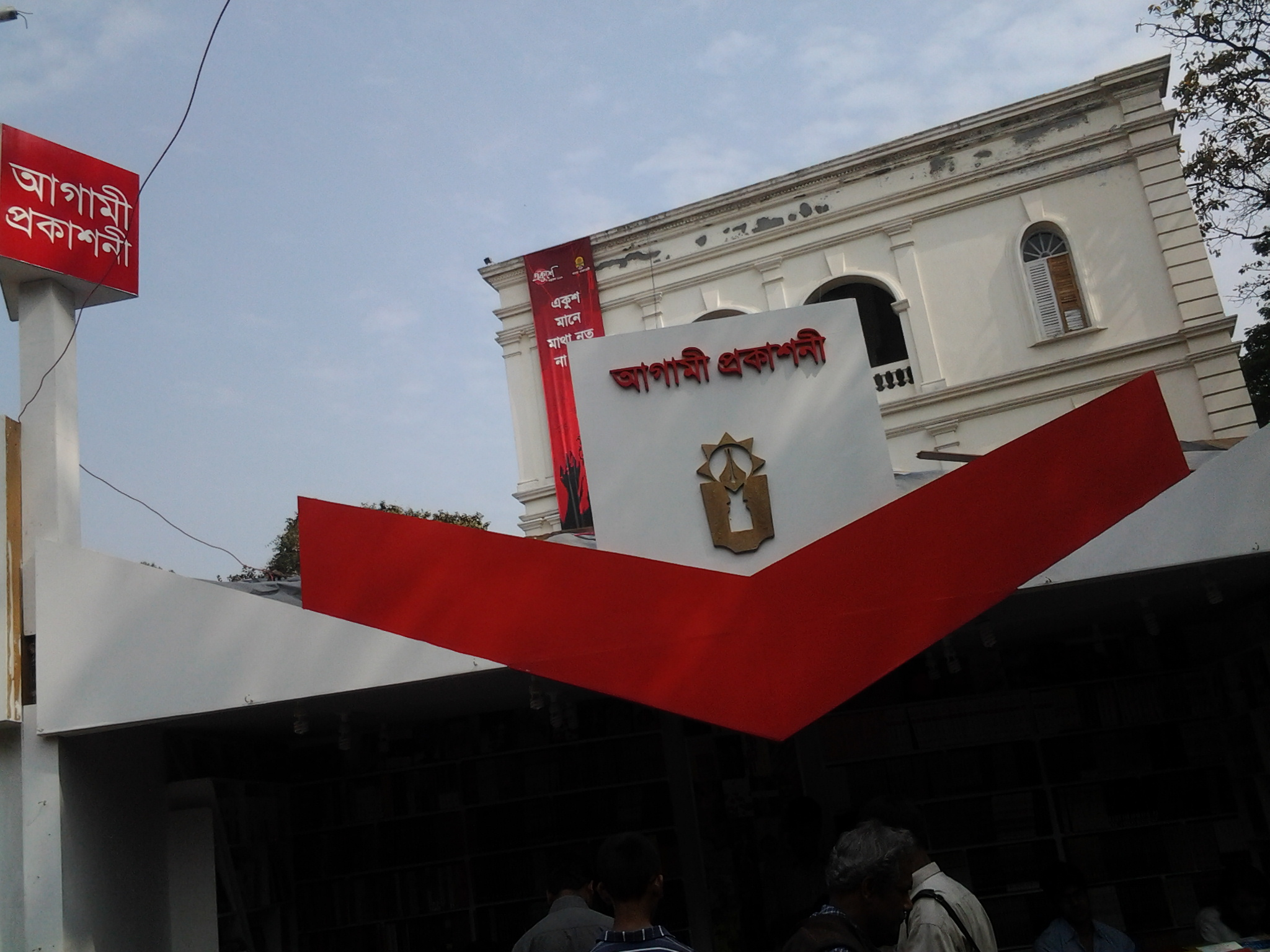
Agamee Prakashani stall at Ekushey Book Fair in 2013
