= Aroj Ali Matubbar =

Bangladeshi philosopher (1900–1985)

- আরজ আলী মাতুব্বর
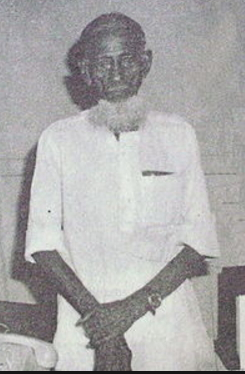
- Born: 17 December 1900; Charbaria Lamchari, Barisal District, Bengal Presidency
- Died: 15 March 1985 (aged 84); Barisal, Bangladesh
- Education: No formal institutional degree
- Occupations: Rationalist, philosopher
- Notable work: Satyer Sandhan; Sristirahasya; Anuman; Muktaman
- Awards: Life Member of Bangla Academy; Humayun Kabir Smriti Puraskar; Award of Honour by the Barisal branch of Udichi Shilpigoshti

Aroj Ali Matubbar (Bengali: আরজ আলী মাতুব্বর; 17 December 1900 – 15 March 1985) was a self-taught Bangladeshi philosopher, humanist and rationalist. He is known for his critical perspectives on religion, superstition, and traditional beliefs, which he expressed in his writings.

== Early life and education ==
Matubbar was born into a poor peasant family in the village of Charbaria Lamchari, about 11 kilometres (6.8 mi) from the city of Barisal in British India, now Bangladesh. His given name was Aroj Ali, but he later adopted the name Matubbar, meaning "local landowner". He briefly attended the village maqtab, focusing on the Qur'an and Islamic studies.

Matubbar's father died when he was 12 years old. He inherited a 2-acre (8,100 m²) plot, which was auctioned off because he could not pay the land taxes as a minor. He was later forcibly evicted from his ancestral homestead by a local landowner. Matubbar supported himself through charity and as a farm laborer.

Unable to afford formal schooling, he initially relied on free religious instruction at a local mosque's maqtab but left due to rigid learning methods. A benefactor helped him finish Bengali primers. Kazi Ghulam Quadir, a philosophy teacher at Brojomohun College, assisted him in borrowing books from the college library.

== Philosophy ==
Matubbar's work is characterized by critical and freethinking views on religion, superstition, and traditional beliefs. His writings questioned established norms and religious doctrines, particularly within the context of Islam in Bangladeshi religion.

He wrote several books, including Rachana Samagra (Vol. I, II, III), Macglashan Chula, Sristirahasya, Onuman, Oprokashito Rochona, Soronika, and Muktaman. His work primarily examined religious practices, rituals, and superstitions, advocating for a more rational and scientific approach.

His book Satyer Sandhan (transl. 'The Quest for Truth') reportedly led to his arrest and detention by the authorities. Throughout his life, he faced harassment and threats due to his writings, which often critically engaged with religious tenets and claims.

== Death ==
Matubbar died on 15 March 1985 (1st Chaitra of the Bengali year 1392) in Barisal, Bangladesh. After his death, his eyes and body were donated; the body was given to the Anatomy Department of Sher-e-Bangla Medical College.

In the years following, Matubbar became recognized as a significant figure in rural Bangladesh by scholars and commentators for challenging entrenched beliefs and superstitions.

== Satyer Sandhan ==
Matubbar drew the cover of his first book—written in 1952 and published twenty-one years later, in 1973—under the title Satyer Sandhan. In the preface, he wrote:

I was thinking of many things, my mind was full of questions, but haphazardly. I then started jotting down questions, not for writing a book, but only to remember these questions later. Those questions were driving my mind towards an endless ocean and I was gradually drifting away from the fold of religion.

In this book, he presented six propositions exploring his philosophical inquiries, with each addressing a distinct topic:

1. The soul (8 questions)
2. God (11 questions)
3. The afterlife (7 questions)
4. Religious matters (22 questions)
5. Nature (10 questions)
6. Remaining topics (9 questions)

The eight questions of his first proposition illustrate his approach:

1. Who am I?
2. Is life incorporeal or corporeal?
3. Are the mind and soul one and the same?
4. What is the relationship of life with the body and the mind?
5. Can we recognize or identify life?
6. Am I free?
7. Will the soul without a body continue to have "knowledge" after it leaves the body at death?
8. How does life come into and go out of the body?

== Written works ==
Matubbar's writing style has been described as unusual. In Bangladesh, his writings were censored, reportedly due to concerns that they might lead to social corruption and disharmony. His writings include:

- Satyer Sandhan (transl. 'The Quest for Truth'), 1973
- Sristirahasya (transl. 'The Mystery of Creation'), 1977
- Anuman (transl. 'Estimation'), 1983
- Muktaman (transl. 'Free Mind'), 1988

Several unpublished manuscripts were published posthumously under the title Aroj Ali Matubbar Rachanabali. Some of his writings were translated into English and compiled in a volume published by Pathak Samabesh.

== Recognition and awards ==
Matubbar was not widely known during most of his lifetime, though he gained recognition among academics in his later years. Public interest in his books grew after his writings were collected and published, as his works explored complex philosophical questions despite his lack of formal academic validation. He became widely known after his death in 1985.

- Life Member of Bangla Academy, inducted in 1985
- Awarded the 'Humayun Kabir Smriti Puraskar' (Humayun Kabir Memorial Prize) in 1978 by the Bangladesh Lekhak Shibir
- Award of Honour by the Barisal branch of Bangladesh Udichi Shilpigoshthi in 1982

Matubbar's life and writings have inspired numerous articles, reviews, novels, and stage dramas.
