= UBINIG =

Non-governmental organization based in Dhaka, Bangladesh

- Formation: 1984
- Headquarters: Dhaka, Bangladesh
- Region served: Bangladesh
- Official language: Bengali
- Website: www.ubinig.org

UBINIG (Unnayan Bikalper Nitinirdharoni Gobeshona, the Policy Research for Development Alternatives) is a non-governmental organization based in Dhaka, the capital of Bangladesh. Founded in 1984, the organization has established nine vidyaghar (learning places). Farida Akhtar is the organization's executive director.

== History ==
UBINIG was established in 1984 by Farhad Mazhar. It founded Prabartana, an organization promoting traditional agriculture and textile manufacturing in 1989. It founded Naya Krishi Andolon, which campaigns against genetically modified and hybrid corps.

UBINIG's stated goals include equality and justice, diversity, and the promotion of social rights and responsibilities. It seeks to train communities in environmental concerns, trade policies, family planning, and labor rights, particularly as they apply to women employed in the clothing industry. It has conducted research on the nutritional values of regional food supplies and made major contributions to the formulation of policies protecting biodiversity in the region.

On seed policy, the organization opposes the use of hybrid seed varieties in the region as requiring burdensome purchase costs along with additional needs for fertilizers, pesticides, and water. In 2008, the organization expressed its opposition to a leading Bangladeshi NGO, BRAC, which promoted hybrid varieties. UBINIG representative Farida Akhter attended the World Bank's annual meeting in October 2023 to present a letter carrying 70,000 supporters' signatures demanding the right for farmers to preserve and use their own seeds.

== See also ==
- Nayakrishi
