= Siraj Sikder =

Bangladeshi Maoist insurgent (1944–1975)

- সিরাজ সিকদার
- Born: Sirajul Huq Sikder; 27 September 1944; Bhedarganj, Bengal, British India
- Died: 2 January 1975 (aged 30); Savar, Dhaka, Bangladesh
- Cause of death: Killed by police
- Resting place: Mohammadpur Graveyard
- Education: BSc
- Alma mater: East Pakistan University of Engineering and Technology
- Occupations: Engineer, teacher, politician
- Years active: 1971–1975
- Employer(s): Construction and Building (C&B) Department, The Engineers Limited, Technical Teachers Training College
- Known for: Poet, writer, freedom fighter, politician
- Political party: Purba Banglar Sarbahara Party
- Spouse(s): Rawshan Ara Mukti (m. 1966; div. 1969) Jahanara Hakim Rahela (m. 1969) Rawshan; Rabeya Khatun Runu; Shaila Amin alias Khaleda
- Partner: Jahanara Hakim Rahela
- Children: 3
- Relatives: Shamim Sikder (sister)

Sirajul Huq Sikder (Bengali: সিরাজুল হক সিকদার; 27 September 1944 – 2 January 1975), better known as Siraj Sikder (Note: Other transliterations include Shiraj Sikdar, Shiraj Sikder, and Siraj Sikdar) (Bengali: সিরাজ সিকদার), was a Bangladeshi revolutionary, freedom fighter, engineer, and Marxist–Leninist–Maoist insurgent.

== Early life ==
Sikder was born on 27 September 1944 in Lakarta Village, Bhedarganj Upazilla, Shariatpur District, British India. His father, Abdur Razzaq Sikder, belonged to a Bengali Muslim zamindar family in Chhaygaon. His sister Shamim Sikder was an eminent sculptor and a professor at the Dhaka University Faculty of Arts. After passing the matriculation examination from Barisal Zilla School in 1959, he was admitted into Barisal Brojomohun College in 1961 for ISc. He obtained a civil engineering degree from the East Pakistan University of Engineering and Technology (now BUET) in 1967.

While he was a student, he became a member of the East Pakistan Student' Union. In 1967, he was elected vice-president of the central committee of the Student Union, and later that year, he joined the C & B Department of the government as an engineer. Three months later he left his job to start a private company named Engineering Limited in Teknaf.

== Political activity ==
On 8 January 1968, along with like-minded activists, Sikder formed a clandestine organization named Purba Bangla Sramik Andolon (East Bengal Workers Movement EBWM) with the objective to lead a struggle against the revisionism of the existing "Communist" organizations and to form a revolutionary Communist Party. This initiative brought forward a thesis that East Bengal is a colony of Pakistan and that the principal contradiction in the society is between the bureaucratic bourgeoisie and feudalists of Pakistan on one hand and the people of East Bengal on the other hand. Only the independence struggle to form an "independent, democratic, peaceful, non-aligned, progressive" People's Republic of East Bengal, free also from the oppression of US imperialism, Soviet social-imperialism, and Indian expansionism, could lead the society forward towards socialism and communism. In late 1968, Sikder left his job to establish the Mao Tse Tung Research Center in Dhaka, but it was later closed down by the Pakistani government. Sikder became a lecturer at the Technical Teachers' Training College in Dhaka.

In the meantime of war, at a liberated base area named Pearabagan at Bhimruli in Jhalokati District in the southern part of the country, on 3 June 1971, Sikder founded a new party named Purba Banglar Sarbahara Party (Proletarian Party of East Bengal) by the ideology of Marxism and Mao Tsetung Thought (not "Maoism"; during the 1960s, the followers of Mao-line used to identify their ideology as Marxism–Leninism–Mao Zedong Thought). At the start of the war, he went to Barisal and declared it a free living space, establishing it as his base and attempting to spread the revolution to other locations. After the independence of Bangladesh, he turned against the Sheikh Mujib government. In April 1973, he formed Purba Banglar Jatiya Mukti Front ("National Liberation Front of East Bengal") and declared war on the Bangladeshi government. Under his leadership, the Sarbahara party carried out attacks against moneylenders and landlords.

== Death ==
In 1975, Siraj Sikder confronted Sheikh Mujibur Rahman, demanding action against corruption and criticizing his policies. This led to a violent response where Sheikh Kamal shot Siraj in front of his father, followed by further assault from others. Eventually, Sheikh Mujib and his associates decided to kill Siraj. He was taken to Jatiya Rakkhi Bahini headquarters, tortured, and shot on 2 January. Sheikh Mujib later referred to Siraj Sikder's death in Parliament, uttering a rhetorical question, "কোথায় সেই সিরাজ শিকদার?!" [English translation roughly implies: "Where is that Siraj Sikder?!"] in a manner perceived by some as boasting and triumphant, implying his involvement and asserting his power, which has been interpreted as reflective of a dictatorial approach. Siraj's father tried to file a case, but due to the oppressive regime, the police refused to accept it.

Sikder had been arrested in Chattogram and was subsequently subjected to first extrajudicial killing after being taken into state custody in independent Bangladesh.
