= Ahmed Sofa =

Bangladeshi writer and poet (1943–2001)

- আহমদ ছফা
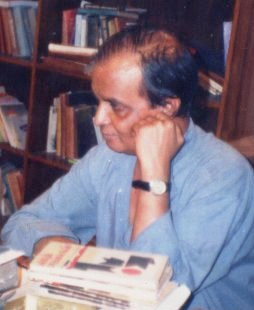
- Sofa in 1995
- Pronunciation: [aɦmɔd sɔfa]
- Born: 30 June 1943; Gachbaria, Chittagong, Bengal Presidency, British India
- Died: 28 July 2001 (aged 58); Dhaka, Bangladesh
- Resting place: Martyred Intellectuals' Graveyard
- Education: University of Dhaka
- Occupation: Writer
- Writing career
- Period: 1967–2001
- Genres: Fiction, non-fiction, short stories, poetry

Ahmed Sofa (Note: Bengali pronunciation: [aɦmɔd sɔfa].) (Bengali: আহমদ ছফা, pronounced [aɦmɔd sɔfa]; 30 June 1943 – 28 July 2001) was a Bangladeshi writer, thinker, novelist, poet, philosopher and public intellectual. Sofa is considered by many, including National Professor Abdur Razzaq and Salimullah Khan, to be the most important Bengali Muslim writer after Mir Mosharraf Hossain and Kazi Nazrul Islam. A writer by occupation, Sofa wrote 18 non-fiction books, 8 novels, 4 collections of poems, 2 collections of short stories, and several books in other genres.

Sofa's Bangali Musalmaner Man (The Mind of the Bengali Muslims, 1981) is a highly acclaimed critical survey of the formation of Bengali Muslims' identity, causes of their backwardness, their development as a community, and their intellectual progress. Anisuzzaman and many others consider Sofa's Bangali Musalmaner Man one of the greatest non-fiction books written in the Bengali language. In Buddhibrittir Natun Binyas (A New Mode of Intellectualism, 1972), Sofa mapped the intellectual landscape of Bangladesh, delineating general opportunistic tendencies of Bangladeshi intellectuals, their collaboration with the Establishment, and their failure to bring any real material change in postcolonial Bangladesh.

Characterized by “a freshness of language”, and "constant experimentation, and novelty" of subject matter and narration, his fictions portrayed Bangladesh with all its social, spiritual and political nuances. Critics acclaimed his intricate characterization depicting psychological and sociocultural subtleties with realism. Abul Fazal, and many others considered Sofa's Omkar (The Om, 1975) the best literary expression of the liberation movement of Bangladesh. Gabhi Bittanta (A Tale of a Cow, 1995), a novel satirizing university teachers involved in party politics and corruption is among the best satires in Bengali literature. Pushpa Briksa ebang Bihanga Puran (Tales of Flowers, Trees, and Birds, 1996) recounts Sofa's spiritual attachments with birds, plants and trees reflecting his profound biophilia and ecoconsciousness. Some of his long poems include Ekti Prabeen Bater Kache Prarthana (Prayer to an Ancient Banayan Tree, 1977), and Basti Ujar (The Eviction of the Shanti Town Dwellers), etc.

Sofa and his works guided, inspired, influenced, and continue to inspire and influence many writers, filmmakers, painters, artists, and intellectuals including Humayun Ahmed, Muhammed Zafar Iqbal, Tareque Masud, Farhad Mazhar, Salimullah Khan, etc. He remains one of the most powerful intellectual influences in Bangladesh through his works and legacy. For a bohemian lifestyle, and outspoken nature, Sofa was a controversial figure during his lifetime. He was called rebel, mad, insolent, devoid of respect for authority, and an overly uncompromising figure among the intellectuals. Never to be co-opted by the establishment, Sofa rejected Lekhak Shibir Award in 1975, and Sa'dat Ali Akanda Award offered by Bangla Academy in 1993. He was awarded Ekushe Padak posthumously by the Government of Bangladesh in 2002.

== Biography ==
Ahmed Sofa was born into a family of farmers at Gachbaria in the district of Chattogram. His father was Hedayet Ali, and his mother, Asiya Khatun. He was supported by his elder brother, Abdus Sobi, to carry on his work in literature. He received his secondary and higher secondary education in Chattogram. He moved to Dhaka in 1962 and were admitted to the Department of Bangla in the University of Dhaka. At the University of Dhaka, he stopped attending classes after getting rebuked by Ahmed Sharif once. In 1967, he earned a bachelor's degree as a private candidate from Brahmanbaria College. In 1970, he earned his master's in political science from the University of Dhaka. In 1970, he was granted a fellowship by Bangla Academy to do his PhD, under the supervision of Abdur Razzaq, on "The Growth of Middle Class in Bengal as it influenced its literature, Society and Economics from 1800 to 1858." This led to his lifelong friendship with Abdur Razzaq though Sofa did not finish his PhD program. He began his writing career in the 1960s. From 1969 till his death, Sofa served many newspapers, weekly and monthly magazines as chief editor, literary editor or advisory editor. Sofa died of cardiac arrest on 28 July 2001 in a hospital in Dhaka. He was buried in the close to the Mirpur Martyred Intellectual Graveyard.

Though Sofa never married, he had relationships with several women; among them, his relationships with Shamim Sikder and Suraya Khanam are notable. These relationships were the basis of Sofa's novel, Ardhek Nari Ardhek Ishvari (Half Women Half Goddess, 1995).

== Writing career ==
=== Non-fictions ===
Marked by "a rare brilliance of genius" and revealing insight, Sofa's non-fiction writings deals with history, sociological issues, contemporary politics, literary and cultural critiques, etc. Sofa's Bangali Musalmaner Man (The Mind of the Bengali Muslims, 1981) contains nine essays written over twelve years from 1969 to 1980. "Rabindranather Sanskriti-Sadhana" was first published in Kanthaswar in 1969 and "Banglar Chitra Oitihya: Sultaner Sadhana" was first published in Mulabhumi in 1980. In the eponymous essay "Bangali Musalmaner Man" first published in Monthly Samakal in 1976, Sofa explored the historical formation of Bengali Muslims' identity across the millennium. The essay considerably changed the academic perception of Bengali Muslims' identity and the subsequent scholarship about the issue. Upon publication, it polarized critics' opinion, some welcoming and others condemning the work. Sofa attributed the causes of the backwardness of Bengali Muslims to the detachment of the ruling class from the mass people.

In another essay titled "On the Issue of Bangladesh's Upper Class and a Social Revolution" (1992), Sofa made a similar point in the present context that the nexus of urban elites had zero ties with the large swathes of poor and struggling people across the country. They feign to feel more foreign here than foreigners themselves. They aspire to identify with a western cultural existence which has no roots in the realities of the millions in this country. Sofa attributed the causes of the religious/secular dichotomies to the absence of a concerted effort for dialogue from the elites. Sofa opined that people in general are not fanatic at all, but the elites' growing distance from the mass people and the continued economic and political deprivation of the majority of Bengali Muslims created a treacherous situation muddled by angst and desperation which may be easily co-opted by international extremist institutions.

In Buddhibrittir Natun Binyas (A New Mode of Intellectualism, 1972), Sofa mapped the intellectual landscape of Bangladesh delineating general opportunistic tendencies of the intellectuals, and their collaboration with the Establishment before and after the liberation of the country. Sofa condemned "the intellectuals who live by their wits, play the intellectuals, and do everything for pure selfish reasons." Sofa reminded the intellectuals of their true responsibility in the newly independent country and warned about the grim future of fascism unless they performed their responsibility properly. Though today Buddhibrittir Natun Binyas is highly acclaimed for its prophetic insight into the future political and cultural prospect of Bangladesh, Badruddin Umar commented that Sofa left the question of class unexplored. Jagrata Bangladesh (Watchful Bangladesh, 1971), Bangladesher Rajnoitik Jatilata (Political Complications in Bangladesh, 1977) explore political crises before and after the liberation of Bangladesh.

=== Fictions ===
As a pioneering novelist of Bangladesh, Sofa brought fresh air both in forms and contents. Sofa's novels and stories were often based on his personal experience and observation. Critics appreciated his portrayal of a society yet to overcome feudal and colonial residual in its social and political matrix, a society where common people's lives are crippled with class struggle and limited opportunities of empowerment. Akhtaruzzaman Elias commented that Sofa mastered the craft of story-telling in his early youth.

Surya Tumi Sathi (Sun, You Are My Companion, 1967) was Sofa's first novel and first book as well. He wrote it at the age of 24. The novel has been called "a heart-warming tale of communal harmony" in a country ridden by communal conflicts and violence. The central conflict of the plot pivots around Hashim whose father got converted into Islam from Hinduism. Hashim's grandmother rises above the orthodox rituals and thoughts of her society by taking responsibility for Hashim's newly born baby.

Omkar (The Om, 1975) recounts the transformation of a mute girl, and how she gets to speak in parallel with the transformation of a community into a nation. The novel delineates the sociopolitical condition of the society as well as the sociofamilial environment very minutely.

In Ekjan Ali Kenaner Utthan Patan (The Rise and Fall of an Ali Kenan, 1988), Sofa created an existentialist character Ali Kenan in a backdrop of Mazar culture in Bangladesh. The political scenes, from Ayub Khan to Sheikh Mujib, are explored from the viewpoint of the people living on the fringe of the society. Salimullah Khan viewed Ali Kenan as a metaphor for Sheikh Mujibur Rahman.

Maranbilash (Death-Wish, 1989) portrays a minister at his deathbed. The minister opens up his mind and makes a confession of his misdeeds to his attendant Moula Box. The tragicomic confession of the minister brings out the dirty secrets of his past involving fratricide, adultery, communal conflicts, etc.

Alat Chakra (A Circle of Fire, 1993) a highly acclaimed novel, tells the love story of Daniel and Tayeba among the war refugees in Kolkata during the liberation war of Bangladesh. The story portrays the refugee intellectuals, and their self-seeking activities in a different light.

Gabhi Bittana (A Tale of a Cow, 1995) satirizes teachers' politics surrounding senate members' election and vice-chancellor selection at the University of Dhaka. Sofa placed the supreme institution of Bangladesh, Dhaka University, in a satirical milieu in Gabhi Bittano. People at Dhaka University were appalled by Sofa's portrayal of them in this novel.

Ardhek Nari Ardhek Ishvari (Half Woman and Half Goddess, 1996), a semi-autobiographical novel, pivots around the protagonists romantic relations with two women. Sofa planned the novel to be a monument of his love.

Pushpa Briksha ebang Bihanga Puran (Tales of Flowers, Trees and Birds, 1996) reflects Sofa's eco-consciousness and biophilia. In this autobiographical novel, Sofa "describes humanism in its most intimate form, an existential reality where we are inextricably connected with the environment that sustains us through our bonds with animals and plants." Upon publication, some critics were reluctant to categorize it as a novel.

=== Poetry and others ===
Written in "a distinctive poetic style", Sofa's Ekti Prabin Bater Kachhe Prarthana (Prayer to an Ancient Banyan Tree, 1977) envisions a Bangladesh free from poverty, exploitation and injustice.

Sofa's translation of Johann Wolfgang von Goethe's Faust was published in 1986. Jadyapi Amar Guru (He Is Still My Teacher, 1998) is his "outstanding memoir" of his friendship with his mentor Professor Abdur Razzaq.

== List of Works ==
=== Poetry ===
1. Jollad Shomoy (1975) —'জল্লাদ সময়'(১৯৭৫)

2. Dukkher Diner Duha (1975) —'দুঃখের দিনের দোহা' (১৯৭৫)

3. Ekti Probin Boter kache Prarthona (1977)—'একটি প্রবীণ বটের কাছে প্রার্থনা'(১৯৭৭)

4. Go-Hakim (1997) — 'গো-হাকিম' (১৯৯৭)

5. Lenin Ghumobe Ebar (1999) — 'লেনিন ঘুমোবে এবার' (১৯৯৯)

6. Ohitagni (2001) — 'অহিতাগ্নি' (২০০১)

== Social and political activism ==
A good organiser, Sofa played an important role in mobilising writers along with Ahmed Sharif to established the Bangladesh Lekhak Shibir. In his early youth, Sofa was involved with the communist party for a short time. He also opened several free school for the children of slum-dwellers in Dhaka. He also organized Sampradayik Dangar Biruddhe Sampreeti Committee (1992–94), Taranga (1993–96), Nagarik Shakti (1995), etc.

== Legacy and influence ==
Today, Sofa is widely regarded as one of the greatest writers in the Bengali language. He was described as a public intellectual "against opportunism", a "dissenting" writer fearless to speak the truth, and a "champion of idealism and progressive culture". "A veritable powerhouse of infinite passion and creative energy", Sofa "cultivated with ease almost all the fields of literary landscape of Bangladesh and produced valuable harvests, both in terms of quality and quantity." National Professor Abdur Razzaq stated that Sofa's works "constitute a treasure trove for Bengali literature" and "they create their own worlds where one can easily forget himself"/herself. Muhammad Zafar Iqbal called Sofa a 100% writer-litterateur from head to toe and wrote "It is our great fortune that a genius like him [Sofa] was born" in Bangladesh. In Farhad Mazhar's opinion, Ahmed Sofa examined and surveyed Bengali Muslim society and the birth of Bangladesh so closely and intimately that nobody would make any progress in any field in Bangladesh, be it Bangladeshi politics, literature, or culture unless one studies and understands Sofa's works properly. Syed Abul Maksud stated that Ahmed Sofa is the biggest patriot he ever saw after 1967 and the biggest enemy of religious fundamentalism. During his lifetime, Sofa was "the ever uncompromising conscience of the nation, always upholding the truth and justice." Ahmed Sharif opined that Sofa was the bravest among Bangladeshi intellectuals. Sharif also said that if Bangladesh had few more Sofas, the country would be on the right track to a progressive society. Salimullah Khan hailed Sofa as a visionary thinker and one of the world's greatest story-tellers and considered him a successor to Kazi Nazrul Islam's legacy. In Aktharuzzaman Elias's opinion, readers accompany Sofa in his journey to feel intimately the human in history and history in the human. Humayun Ahmed called Sofa an incredibly powerful writer and mentioned Sofa as his "mentor."

"Ahmed Sofa Rastroshobha" along with Centre for Asian Art and Culture organize the Ahmed Sofa Memorial Lecture at the University of Dhaka every year. In Chittagong, Ahmed Sofa Centers founded by a teacher at Chittagong University commemorates his work through its activity.

Sofa's novels and stories are frequently adapted into plays, films, etc. Kaler Nayak (The Hero of the Age, 2014) written by Gazi Tanzia is a novel based on Ahmed Sofa's life.

There is a street in Dhaka named Ahmed Sofa Sarani after him.

In July 2026, nearly 25 years after his death, Sofa's remains were transferred from the general section of the Martyred Intellectuals Graveyard in Mirpur to the section reserved for nationally recognized intellectuals and freedom fighters. The reinterment was carried out under the supervision of the Dhaka North City Corporation (DNCC) following an application submitted by his family. According to bdnews24.com, Sofa's nephew Nurul Anwar submitted the application on 11 January 2026, and the proposal was unanimously approved at the 14th meeting of the DNCC on 13 April 2026.

== Controversy and criticism ==
For a bohemian lifestyle, and outspoken nature, Sofa was a controversial figure during his lifetime. He was called rebel, devoid of regards for authority, and unnecessarily uncompromising harming his personal good. Rahat Khan once called him mad. His disagreements with Humayun Azad, Taslima Nasreen, and few others and subsequent denunciation of one another through write-ups were very much discussed and are still discussed by peers and new generation of writers. A professional writer, Sofa endured financial hardship though he was also known for his prodigality helping many in their need. Many speculate that early in Sofa's life, he used to frequent Abdur Razzaq's residence to seek financial help. German embassy in Dhaka financed Sofa's translation of Johann Wolfgang von Goethe's Faust. Sofa helped publish Muammar Gaddafi's The Green Book in Bengali. Many were critical of his connection with Libyan and German embassies.

Sofa wanted to immolate himself with a tinful of kerosene in 1972 to protest an attempted eviction of Humayun Ahmed's family from a house (allotted by government for the martyrs' family); Sikandar Abu Zafar stopped him from self-immolation by assuring and ensuring the prevention of the eviction. Humayun Ahmed reminisced about the event many times in his different memoirs.

== Selected bibliography ==
Sofa published 18 non-fiction books, 8 novels, 4 collections of poems, 1 collection of short stories, and several books in other genres. His writings were initially published in journals, newspapers, weekly and monthly magazines, then reprinted in standard book formats.

Essays

- Jagrata Bangladesh (Watchful Bangladesh, 1971)
- Buddhibrttir Natun Binyas (A New Mode of Intellectualism, 1972)
- Banglabhasha: Rajnitir Aloke (The Bengali Language: In the Light of Politics, 1975)
- Bangladesher Rajnoitik Jatilata (Political Complications in Bangladesh, 1977)
- Sipahi Yuddher Itihas (History of the Sepoy Movement, 1979)
- Bangali Musalmaner Man (The Mind of the Bengali Muslims, 1981)
- Sheikh Mjibur Rahman O Anyanya Prabantdha (Sheikh Mujibur Rahman and Other Essays, 1989)
- Rajnitir Lekha (Political Writings, 1993)
- Anupurbik Taslima O Anyanya Sparshakatara Prasanga (Taslima from Beginning to End and Other Sensitive Issues, 1994)
- Samprathik Bibechana: Buddhibrittir Natun Binyas (Reconsideration: A New Mode of Intellectualism, 1997)
- Shantichukti O Nirabachita Prabandha (Peace Treaty and Selected Essays, 1998)
- Yadyapi Amar Guru (He is Still My Teacher, 1998)

Novels

- Surjo Tumi Sathi (Sun, You are My Companion, 1967)
- Omkar (The Om, 1975)
- Ekjan Ali Kenaner Utthan Patan (The Rise and Fall of an Ali Kenan, 1989)
- Maranbilas (Death-Wish, 1989)
- Alatachakra (A Circle of Fire, 1990)
- Gabhi Bittanta (A Tale of a Cow, 1994)
- Ardhek Nari Ardhek Ishvari (Half Woman and Half Goddess, 1996)
- Puspa Briksa ebang Bihanga Puran (Tales of Flowers, Trees and Birds, 1996)

Short stories

- Nihata Nakshatra (Slain Star, 1969)

Poems

- Jallad Samay (Time, the Hangman, 1975)
- Ekti Prabin Bater Kachhe Prarthana (Prayer to an Ancient Banayan Tree, 1977)
- Lenin Ghumobe Ebar (Lenin Will Sleep Now, 1999)

Juvenile stories

- Dolo Amar Kanakchapa (Let's Rock, My Kanakchapa, 1968)

Nursery rhymes

- Go-Hakim (Bovine Justice, 1977)
