= Abdur Razzaq (professor) =

Professor

National Professor Abdur Razzaq
- আবদুর রাজ্জাক
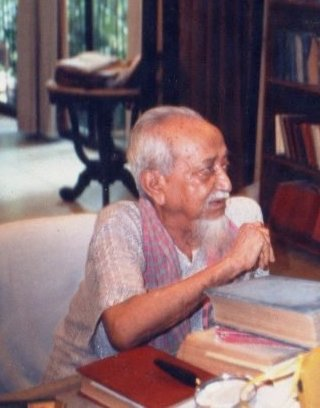
- Professor Razzaq
- Born: c. 1914; Kalatia, Keraniganj, Dhaka, Bengal Presidency, British India
- Died: 28 November 1999 (aged 84–85); Dhaka, Bangladesh
- Citizenship: (British Raj) British Indian (1914–1947) (Pakistan) Pakistani (1947–1971) (Bangladesh) Bangladeshi (1971–1999)
- Occupations: Academic; Professor; Educator
- Title: Professor

Academic background
- Education: Dhaka College; University of Dhaka; London School of Economics
- Thesis: Political Parties in India
- Doctoral advisor: Harold Laski

Academic work
- Discipline: Political science
- Sub-discipline: Political economy, Political philosophy, International relations
- Institutions: University of Dhaka
- Notable students: Sheikh Mujibur Rahman, Ahmed Sofa, Sardar Fazlul Karim, Rehman Sobhan, Rounaq Jahan, Salimullah Khan
- Main interests: Social sciences and humanities
- Influenced: Ahmed Sofa

Prof. Abdur Razzaq (Bengali: আবদুর রাজ্জাক, pronounced [abd̪uɾ ɾad͡ʒːak]; c. 1914 – 28 November 1999) was a Bangladeshi scholar, academic, public intellectual and one of the first National Professors of Bangladesh.

His breadth of expertise spanned various fields, with a particular focus on oriental studies, history, and politics. Regarded as the esteemed "teacher of teachers," he garnered a diverse following that included not only intellectuals but also numerous influential political figures, among them Sheikh Mujibur Rahman.

== Early life and education ==
Razzaq was born in 1914 in the village of Kalatia in Keraniganj, Dacca district, Bengal Presidency. His father, Abdul Ali, was a police officer from Alinagar in Keraniganj. After his matriculation from the Government Muslim High School, Dhaka and intermediate exam from Dhaka College, he was admitted to the department of political economy at the University of Dhaka in 1931. In 1936, he completed his masters and then joined as a lecturer in the same department. When the department of political economy was bisected, he chose to join the department of political science. After the second world war, he went to London to study under Harold Laski at London School of Economics. He returned home without any formal degree after Laski had died in 1950 and carried on teaching in the department of political science at the University of Dhaka until 1975. He also taught in the departments of economics and international relations.

== Career ==
Razzaq's political ideas influenced anti-Ayub-government movements during the 1960s; to get rid of his influence, the Ayub regime tried to "dismiss him from his teaching position at the University of Dhaka on the allegation that he was not mindful of his duties as a teacher, but which the government failed to establish in the court". During the Bangladesh Liberation War, he witnessed the March 1971 Dhaka University massacre. The Pakistanis came to arrest him at his home, but alerted by their kicking at his door, he escaped out the back. The Yahya Khan-government sentenced him in absentia to a fourteen-year rigorous imprisonment, accusing him of treasonable acts.

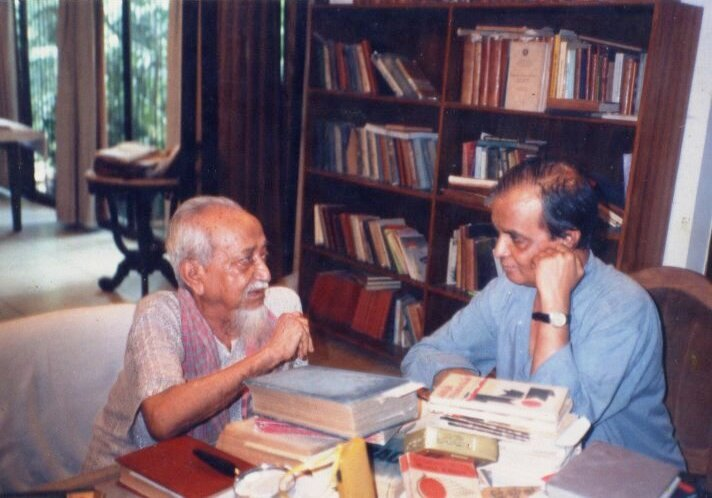
Abdur Razzaq (left), Ahmed Sofa (right)

Though Razzaq, apart from some essays and lectures, has no published works, many intellectuals have admitted his influence on their published works. Ahmed Sofa wrote his book, Jaddapi Amar Guru (Eventhough My Teacher), describing Sofa's relationship with Razzaq. Sardar Fazlul Karim published a book, Dhaka Bisshobiddalay O Purbabangya Samaj, based on his interviews of Razzaq. Salimullah Khan wrote a book on his lecture Bangladesh: State of the Nation. Muntassir Mamoon, Humayun Azad and others reminisced about him. It is claimed that he had as his students more than 70 members of parliament, among whom Sheikh Mujibur Rahman is the most notable.

== Honours ==
To acknowledge his unique status as a teacher, the Government of Bangladesh honoured him with the distinction of National Professor in 1975. In 1973, the University of Delhi awarded him an honorary D.Litt. degree.
