= Surjo Tumi Sathi =

1967 novel by Ahmed Sofa

- Author: Ahmed Sofa
- Original title: Surjo Tumi Sathi
- Language: Bengali
- Genre: Humanitarian expression of Communalism
- Published: 1967
- Publication place: Bangladesh

Surjo Tumi Sathi (Bengali: সূর্য তুমি সাথী; English: Sun, You Are My Companion) is the first novel by Ahmed Sofa. It was published in 1967.

== Synopsis ==
The story of the novel revolves around a village in Chittagong. Hashim, son of a converted Muslim father Harimohon has been through oppression for his whole life. He hardly supports his family. Kholu Matobbor, the source of power and oppression of the village controls the whole village. Communal behavior village people has been shown very cruelly in this novel. Hashim's grandmother cannot visit him freely because of difference in religion. However, after Sufia's death humanity wins since his grandmother finds her deserted child's reflection in Hashim's baby.

== Characters ==
- Hashim, central character
- Sufia, Hashim'w wife
- Kholu Matobbor, tyrannical character

and many more

== Reception ==
The book was written in 1964-65 and in the year 1967 it was published. Sofa himself considered it to be his masterpiece. Professor Abul Fazal said about this novel, “This much artistic maturity at such a young age is beyond my imagination.”
