= Shoparjito Shadhinota =

Public sculpture in Bangladesh

Coordinates: 23.7323°N 90.3952°E

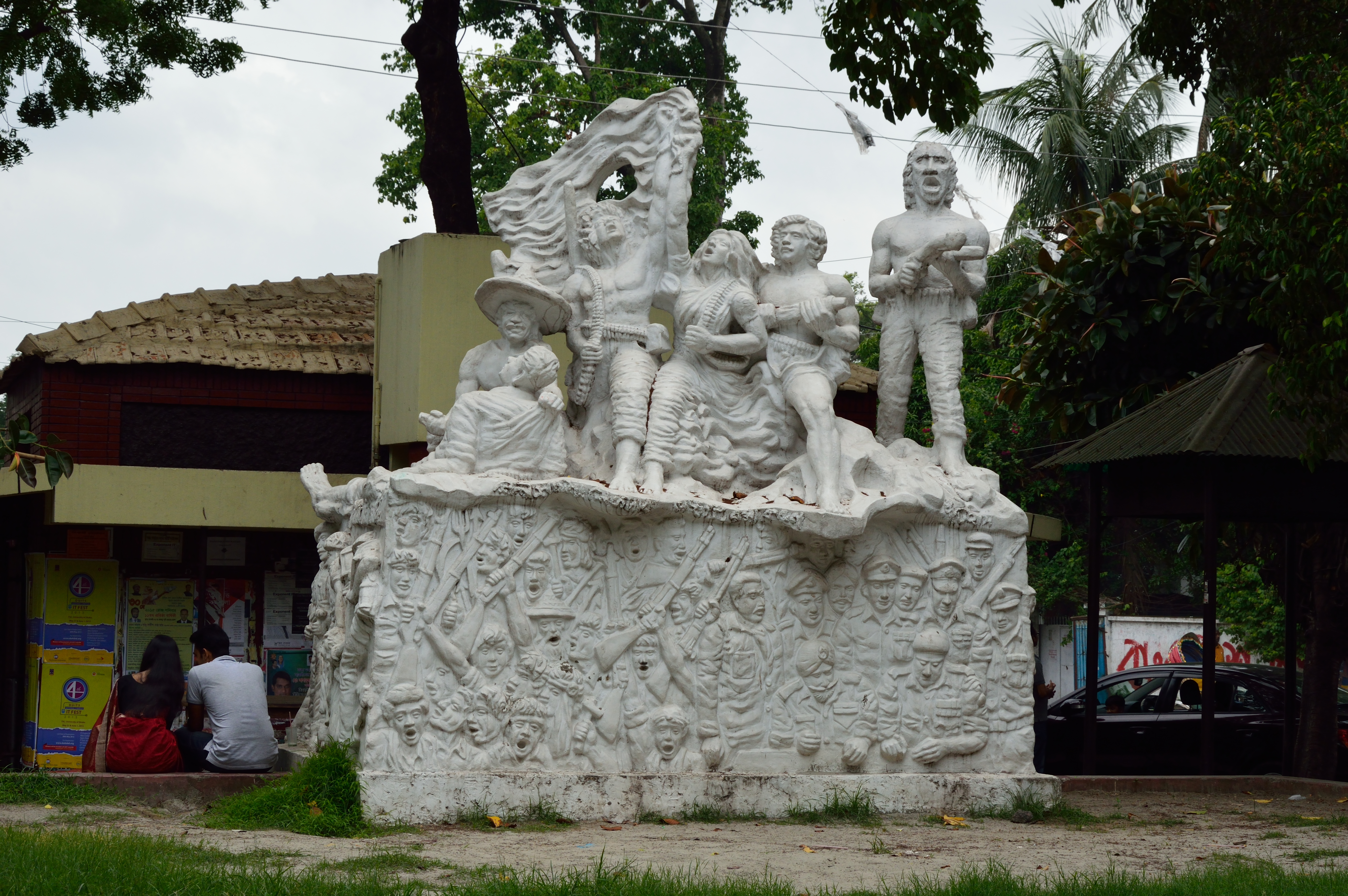
Shoparjito Shadhinota

Shoparjito Shadhinota (English: Self-earned Freedom) is a sculpture by Shamim Sikder commemorating the Bangladesh Liberation war.

== History ==
The sculpture was built in 1990, and is located in Dhaka University. After the statue was inaugurated Islamic extremists threatened to destroy it.
