= Farida Akhter =

Bangladeshi political adviser

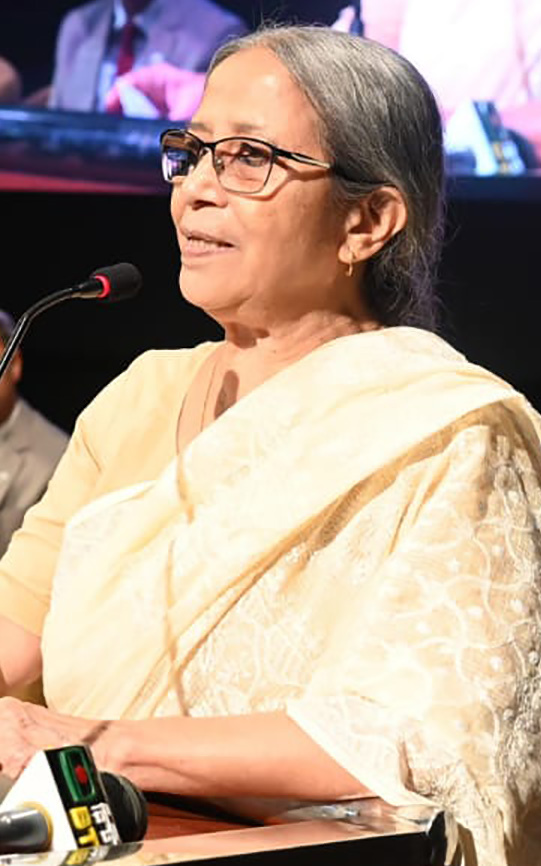
- Farida Akhter in 2025

Adviser for Fisheries and Livestock
- In office 9 August 2024 – 17 February 2026
- President: Mohammed Shahabuddin
- Chief Adviser: Muhammad Yunus
- Preceded by: Abdur Rahman

Personal details
- Born: 1953 (age 72–73) Chattogram, Bangladesh
- Spouse: Farhad Mazhar
- Education: Department of Economics, Chittagong University

Farida Akhter (born 1953) is a Bangladeshi political adviser. She was an adviser to the Interim government of Bangladesh and the executive director of UBINIG (Policy Research on Development Options). She is also an advisor to the current interim government in Ministry of Fisheries and Livestock.

== Early life and education ==
Farida Akhter was born in 1953 in Harla village of Chandanaish Upazila, Chittagong District, Bangladesh. She studied economics at Chittagong University.

== Career ==
Akther opposed reserved seats in parliament for women in 2004 saying she preferred direct elections. She had filed a petition against the Fourteenth Amendment to the Constitution of Bangladesh, which created reservation for women in the parliament. In 2007, she said "We urge the government to reduce the use of private cars and stop their imports," in reference to the Japanese government proposing investing in biofuel due to global warming.

Akther filed a petition along with Adilur Rahman Khan, Dipu Moni, and Nasiruddin Elan successfully challenging the legality of the Truth and Accountability Commission in 2008.

In 2011, Akhter signed a statement calling for justice for Rumana Manzur, a victim of domestic violence. She was awarded the Sultana Kamal Independence Day Award in 2011. She signed a statement against the removal of Muhammad Yunus from the post of chairman of Grameen Bank. Akhter, as organizer of Naya Krishi Andolon, opposed the introduction of Bt Brinjal. She defended the Hefazat-e-Islam Bangladesh's 13-point demands, including death penalty for blasphemy. In June 2015, she would found innocent of contempt of court charges following her comments on the International Crimes Tribunal finding David Bergman guilty of contempt of court.

On 2 August 2024, Akhter called on the government to release all those detained in the quota reform movement protests. Following the fall of the Sheikh Hasina led Awami League government, she was appointed an advisor in the Muhammad Yunus led interim government.

== Personal life ==
She is married to writer, columnist, and poet Farhad Mazhar. In July 2017, Akhter filed an abduction case after her husband, Fahad Mazhar, was abducted from Dhaka. Her sister is Sayyida Akhter.
