= Chittagong Cantonment Public College =

Public school in Chattogram, Bangladesh

Coordinates: 22.3972°N 91.8150°E

- চট্টগ্রাম ক্যান্টনমেন্ট পাবলিক কলেজ

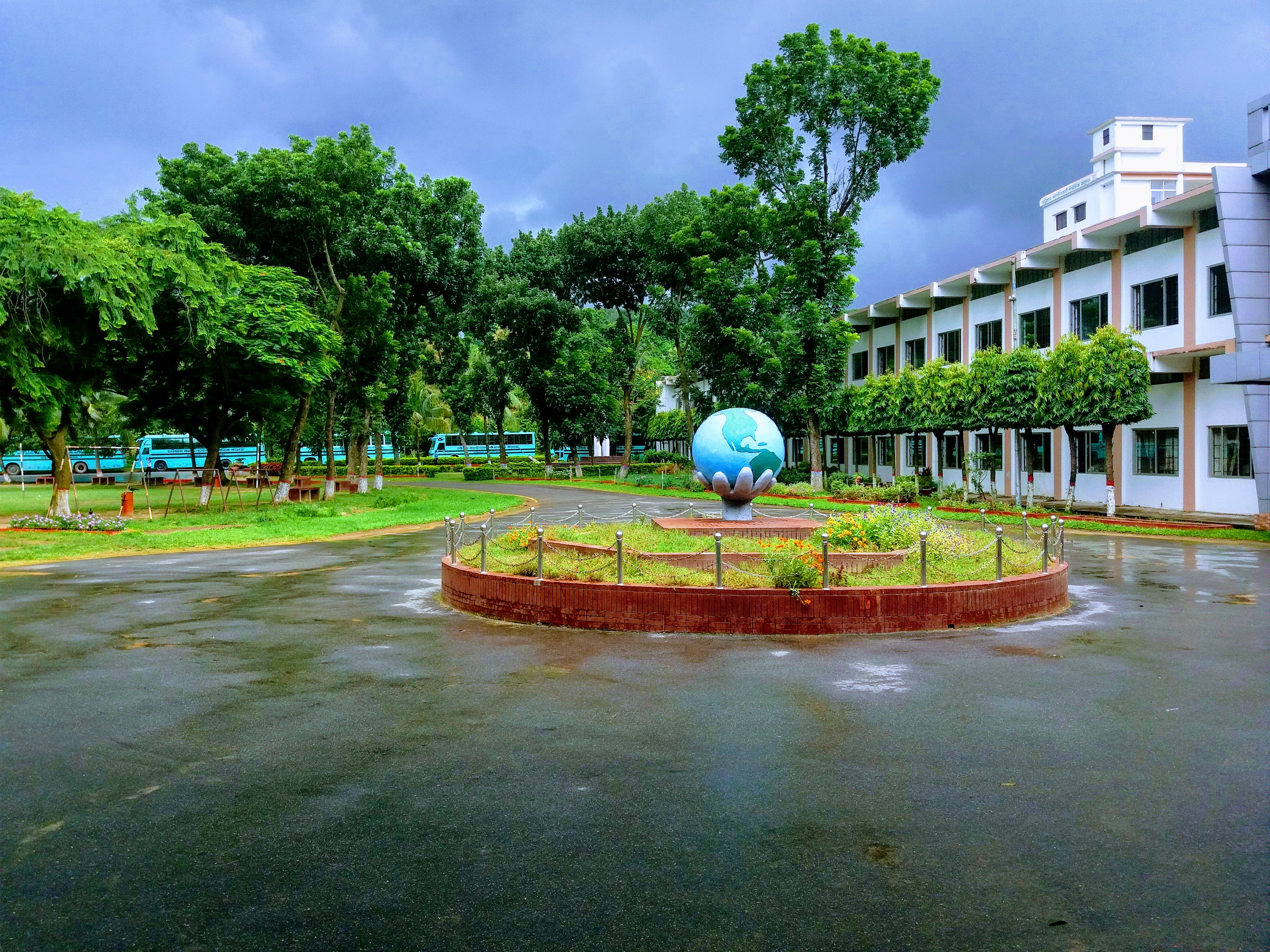
- Chittagong; Bangladesh

Information
- Type: Public
- Motto: আল্লাহ আমায় জ্ঞান দাও (Grant me wisdom, O lord!)
- Established: 1961
- Area trustee: Chittagong Cantonment
- Principal: Colonel Md Iqbal Hossain, psc
- Language: Bengali and English
- Campus: Urban; 20 acres (0.081 km^{2})
- Houses: Nazrul Pritilata Begum Rokeya Jahangir
- Color: (School) (College) (University)
- Sports: Cricket, Basketball, Hockey, Football
- Nickname: CCPC
- Newspaper: Giribarta
- Yearbook: Giriprava
- Affiliation: Ministry of Education National University
- Website: ccpc.edu.bd

Chittagong Cantonment Public College, formerly Chittagong Public School and College is a primary, higher secondary and degree awarding educational institution in Chittagong Cantonment in Chittagong, Bangladesh. It was established in 1961, and administered by the Bangladesh Army. The institution also offers post-secondary education. It has been consecutively awarded the "Best College" award of the Chittagong district in "Jatio Shikkha Shoptaho" by the Ministry of Education in 2016, 2017 and 2018, 2023 and 2024, 2026.

== Curriculum ==
Chittagong Cantonment Public College follows the Bangladeshi National Curriculum in English and Bengali.

== History ==
Chittagong Cantonment Public College was founded on October 17, 1961, by the then President of Pakistan, Field Marshal Ayub Khan, NPk, HJ, at the invitation of the then Station Commander of Chittagong Cantonment, Colonel Ahmed Ali Sheikh, TPk. The institution officially began its journey on October 23, 1961, under the Chittagong Cantonment Public School Foundation.

Lieutenant Colonel M. Sardar Khan, a retired officer of the Army Education Corps with experience in Cadet Colleges and Public Schools, was appointed as the first principal. Academic activities commenced on April 2, 1969, with 24 students and three female teachers.

The institution received its first recognition from the Board of Secondary and Higher Secondary Education, Comilla, on January 1, 1971, and introduced the Humanities stream in 9th grade. However, during the Liberation War of 1971, the institution suffered damage. After independence, it was temporarily used as a shelter for prisoners, and a British-based NGO utilized the premises as an orphanage for war-affected families.

The institution introduced the National Curriculum English Medium from 6th grade in 2003. In 2008, students appeared for their first secondary-level board examinations, followed by the higher secondary board examinations in 2010.

Since the 2005-2006 academic year, the National University has approved BBA and Management (Honors) courses.

== Administration ==
This institution is usually led by an army principal who is usually a Colonel of the Bangladesh Army. At present, the principal is Col Md Iqbal Hossain, psc. The school and college sections have separate vice-principals.

== List of principals ==
- A.B. Ashraf Uddin Ahmed (7.02.75–14.05.78)
- Golam Jilani Najre Murshid (15.05.78–15.11.99)
- L. Colonel Abdul Baten, AEC (04.01.00–29.08.02)
- Colonel Mokarram Ali Khan (29.08.02–18.10.03)
- L. Colonel Mohammed Shamsul Alam, PSC AEC (24.11.03–17.01.05)
- Colonel Sayed Mofazzel Maola (17.01.05–15.08.05)
- Colonel Shah Murtaza Ali (16.08.05–04.02.07)
- Colonel Mohamed Jahid Hossain, Phd (09.05.07–16.08.08)
- Colonel Mohammed Anisur Rahman, PSC (17.08.08–20.03.10)
- Colonel Syed Golam Jahid, PSC (20.03.10-07.08.12)
- Colonel Muhammed Asadujjaman Subhani (08.08.12–16.01.13)
- Colonel Shahriyar Ahmed Chowdhury, PSC (17.01.13–12.12.13)
- Colonel Abu Saleh Muhammed Rafiqul Islam, AEC (01.01.14–06.06.15)
- Colonel Abu Naser Muhammed Toha, AFWC, PSC (06.06.15-14.02.18)
- Colonel Md. Moniruzzaman, psc (16.02.18-30.04.21)
- Col Mujibul Haque Sikder, PBGM
- Col Md Iqbal Hossain, psc

== Faculties and departments ==
The institution has only one faculty.

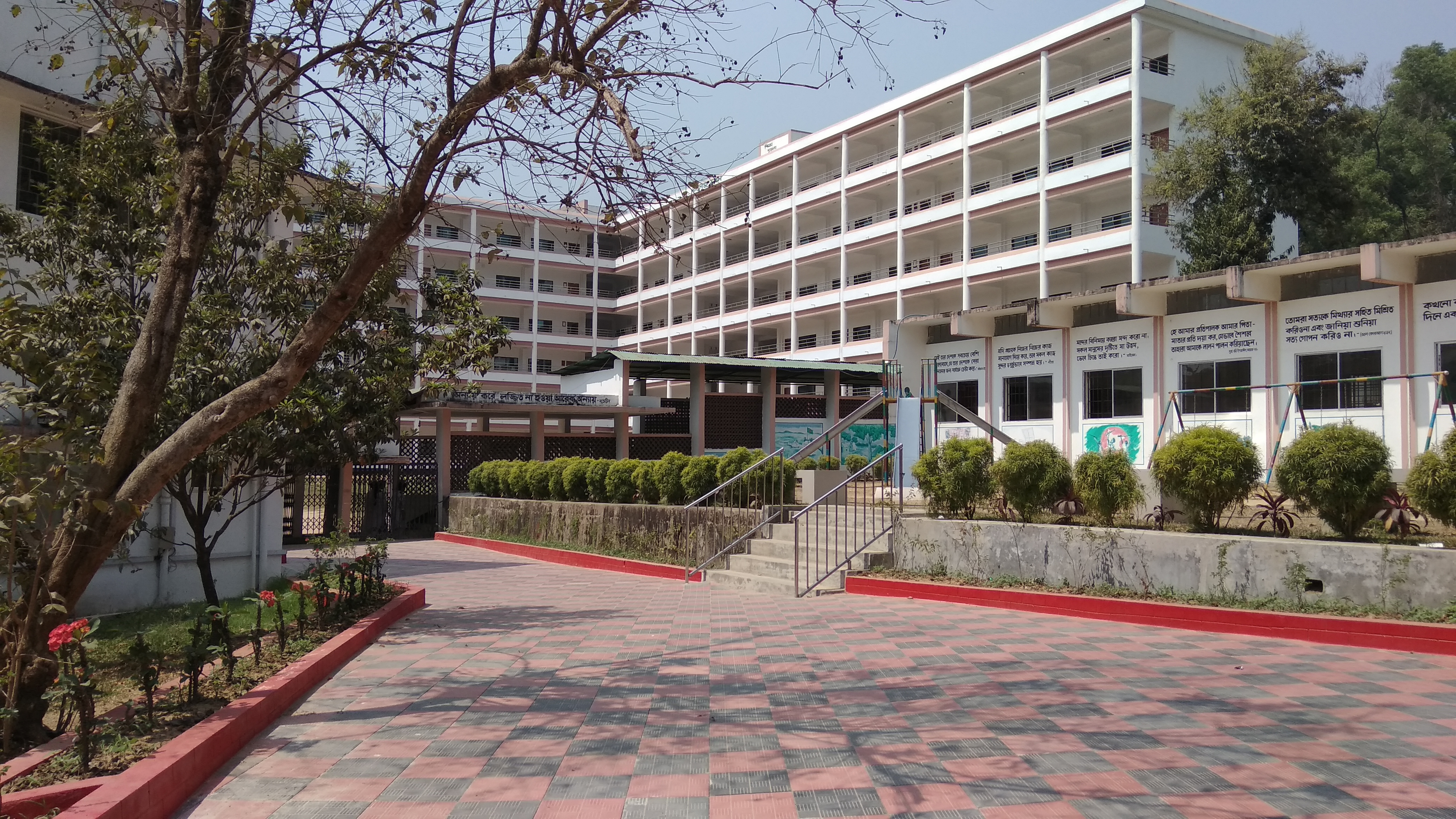
College section of the institution

=== Faculty of Business Studies ===
- Department of Management

=== Professional course ===
- Bachelor of Business Administration

== Extra-curricular activities ==
Students of this institution participate in various activities outside of their studies. They have achievements in various sectors including science fairs, different olympiads etc. The institution also runs many clubs and programs.

== Students ==
CCPC's student population has recently ranged from 3,500 to 4,000, across all programs (1st grade-degree level). CCPC has enrolled nearly 2,500 students in school programs, 1000 students in college programs, and around 500 students in degree programs. The total population is 45% female and 55% male students.It has separate buildings for pre-schoolers, Elementary schoolers, high schoolers, college students and higher education level students

== Notable alumni ==
- Adil Hossain Noble, actor and model
- Salimullah Khan, Bangladeshi writer, academic, teacher and public intellectual
- Mila Islam, folk and pop singer
- Dilara Zaman, film and television actress
- Ayman Sadiq, educator and entrepreneur
