= Gabhi Bittanto =

1995 satirical novel by Ahmed Sofa

- The front cover of the 1st edition of Gabhi Bittanto, 1995
- Author: Ahmed Sofa
- Original title: গাভী বিত্তান্ত
- Language: Bengali
- Genre: Satire
- Published: 1995
- Publication place: Bangladesh

Gabhi Bittanta (Bengali: গাভী বিত্তান্ত, English: A Tale of a Cow) is a 1995 satirical novel by Ahmed Sofa. Considered one of the best satires in Bengali literature, it satirizes "the practice and politics of vice-chancellorship and intellectual poverty" in Bangladeshi universities.

== Background ==
The novel is based on a true story. The novel's protagonist Abu Zunayed, the vice chancellor of the premier university of the country, is based on Abdul Mannan who was the vice chancellor of Dhaka University from 1986 to 1990. Abdul Mannan used to keep a dairy cow which was killed amid factional clash among different student groups involved in politics. Sofa's Gabhi Bittanto presents a fictional account of that event.

== Synopsis ==
The story of the novel revolves around chemistry professor Abu Zunayed, a newly appointed vice chancellor of the oldest and the most prestigious university of the country. In flash back, the narrator narrates that there was no chance Zunayed would be nominated for the VC panel, let alone get appointed in the position of VC, but he got nominated finally due to the influence and support of Zunayed's colleague young Dilruba Khanam, who manipulated her feminine charm to get others support Zunayed since she harbors grudge against the previous VC for some personal reason. Despite getting the lowest number of votes in the nomination, the country's president, who is also the university's chancellor, appoints Zunayed as the VC since Zunayed was thought to be someone who would be subservient to the regime reigning the country.

== Characters ==
- Mian Muhammad Abu Zunayed, chemistry professor and the vice-chancellor of the university
- Begam Nurunnahar Banu, Zunayed's wife
- Dilruba Khanam, chemistry lecturer and very active in the politics of Dorakata Dal
- Sheikh Tabarak Ali, a development contractor who bribes the VC a cow
- Abed Hossain, Ali's BUET-graduate son-in-law
- Janardan Chakrabarti, an old part-time teacher
- Mawlana Abu Taher

== Reception ==
Gabhi Bittanto is considered "a canonical piece" describing "the absurd practices in the academic arena of Bangladesh." A third year law student of the University of Dhaka protested against the question paper leak of the admission test held on 12 October 2018 (later re-held on 16 November 2018 invalidating the former) by reading Gabhi Bittanto as an act of protest during his hunger strike.
