= Farhad Mazhar =

Bangladeshi writer and activist

- ফরহাদ মজহার
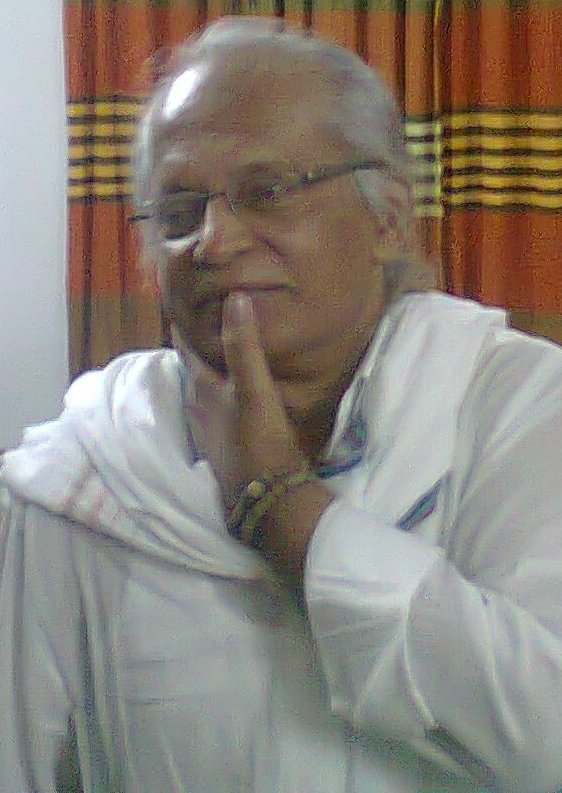
- Farhad Mazhar in 2012
- Pronunciation: [fɔɾɦad̪ mɔzɦaɾ]
- Born: 9 August 1947 (age 79); Noakhali, Bengal Presidency, British India
- Education: University of Dhaka; The New School
- Occupations: Poet, columnist, activist, intellectual
- Spouse: Farida Akhter
- Website: www.chintaa.com

Farhad Mazhar (Bengali: ফরহাদ মজহার, pronounced [fɔɾɦad̪ mɔzɦaɾ]; born 9 August 1947) is a Bangladeshi poet, philosopher, social and human rights activist, and environmentalist. In the aftermath of the recent mass uprising in Bangladesh, he also emerged as a vocal critic of the country's constitution. His book, Gono-ovyutthan o Gathan (গণঅভ্যুত্থান ও গঠন, Mass Uprising and Constitution, 2023), has a major influence on the student leaders who led the mass uprising. He is also one of the founders and the managing director of UBINIG.

== Biography ==
Mazhar graduated with honours in pharmacy from the University of Dhaka in 1967 and worked as a pharmacist in New York City in the seventies and eighties. He also studied political economy in The New School for Social Research. He is the founding member and managing director of UBINIG (Policy Research for Development Alternative), a policy research and advocacy group in Bangladesh working as an integral part of the community with the grassroots people to strengthen common resistance against the dominant processes of globalisation as well as creating space for strategic negotiations whenever possible.

Since the early days of his intellectual career, Farhad Mazhar has always been committed to Karl Marx, particularly because of his analysis of capital and the formation of revolutionary subjects. His recent intellectual contribution is more concerned with the critical understanding of religion, spirituality and the question of class narratives in a post-colonial society. He is virulently critical of the vulgar materialist reduction of Marx's contribution as well as the teachings of his revolutionary followers by the conventional left in Bangladesh. Mazhar argues for a new politics which is more informed by the experience of the failure of previous socialist projects and the recent developments in philosophy and politics. Beside being an accomplished poet, he is considered as the major radical thinker in Bangladesh.

After Mazhar had been arrested in 1995, Nadine Gordimer, Jacques Derrida and Mahasweta Devi wrote a letter in The New York Times saying,

We join our voices to theirs in demanding the immediate release of Farhad Mazhar and restoration of full citizen's rights, including due process.

Gayatri Chakravorty Spivak mentioned him in her lecture "Many Voices" while receiving the Kyoto Prize in Arts and Philosophy in 2012 saying, "The poet Farhad Mazhar, with whom I had formed a friendship in the seventies, introduced me to the practitioners at the devotional school of Lalan Shah Fakir, a 19th century grassroots theologian and minstrel composer of amazing depth and invention...Farhad has recently reminded me that I had counseled him to sink himself in Lalan. Yet I think of Lalan as his gift to me."

Following the 2013 Motijheel Shootings, Mazhar was one of the few public intellectuals within Bangladesh to challenge the government's disinformation campaign. and the liberal logic of massacre. William Gomes has recently compared Farhad Mazhar with Maulana Abdul Hamid Khan Bhashani and said, "Farhad Mazhar, who has continuously battled against the current fascistic regime with tolerates no dissent and demands absolute loyalty from the local press corps. He very recently stand alone against the covered-up massacre in Dhaka, where unarmed protesters were allegedly extrajudicially killed by the law enforcement agencies as they meditated and slept in the early hours on May 6th under cover of darkness."

== Criticism ==
Salimullah Khan criticized him for inciting violence before and after 2014 Bangladeshi general election.

== Alleged Abduction ==
In 2017, Mazhar was found on a bus after his family had reported him missing. He sparked a police hunt after leaving his Dhaka home on Monday morning. There were reports of a ransom demand. Police said Mazhar was eventually found on a bus travelling to the capital from the south-western city of Khulna. It was unclear if he had been abducted.

== Personal life ==
Mazhar is married to Farida Akhter, adviser to the 2024 Bangladesh interim government.

== Bibliography ==
=== Prose ===
- Prastab (Proposal, 1976)
- Sashastra Ganaabhyutthan Ebang Ganatantrik Rashtrer Utthan Prasange (On Armed Mass Revolt and the Rise of Democratic State, 1985)
- Rajkumari Hasina (Princess Hasina, 1995)
- Sainjir Dainya Gan (2000)
- Jagadish (2002)
- Samna Samni: Farhad Mazharer Sange Kathabarta (2004)
- Banijya O Bangladesher Janagan (2004)
- Mokabila (2006)
- Ganapratiraksha (2006)
- Kshamatar Bikar O Ganashaktir Udbodhan (2007)
- Purushtantra O Nari (2008)
- Bhabandolan (2008)
- Samrajyabad (Imperialism, 2008)
- Rakter Dag Muchhe Rabindrapath (2008)
- Sambidhan O Ganatantra (Constitution and Democracy, 2008)
- Nirbachita Prabandha (Selected Essays, 2008)
- Crossfire: Rashtrer Rajnaitik Hatyakanda (Crossfire: Political Carnage by the State, 2008)
- Jacques Derrida-r Chihna Bichar (2010)
- Timir Janya Logicbidya (2011)
- Pran O Prakriti (Life and Nature, 2011)
- Marx Pather Bhoomika (An Introduction to the Study of Marx, 2011)
- Jaruri Abastha: Rashtra O Rajneeti (2012)
- Digital Fascibad (Digital Fascism, 2012)
- Yuddha Aro Kathin Aro Gabheer (2014)
- Byakti Bandhutwa O Sahitya (2016)
- Marx, Foucault O Ruhaniyat (Marx, Foucault and Spirituality, 2018)

=== Poetry ===
- Khokan Ebang Tar Pratipurush (The Dear Boy and His Representative, 1972)
- Tribhanger Tinti Jyamiti (Three Geometries of the Ill-shaped Man, 1977)
- Amake Tumi Danr Kariye Diyechho Biplaber Samne (You Have Pushed Me Towards Revolution, 1983)
- Lieutenant General Truck (1984)
- Subhakusum Dui Pharma (1985)
- Briksha (The Tree, 1985)
- Akasmat Raptanimukhi Narimachine (1985)
- Khasra Gadya (1987)
- Meghmachiner Sangeet (1988)
- Asamayer Noteboi (1994)
- Daradi Bakul (1994)
- Gubre Pokar Shwashur (2000)
- Kabitar Boner Sange Abar (2003)
- Cameragiri (2010)
- Shreshtha Kabita (2010)
- Ebadatnama (2011)
- E Samayer Kabita (2011)
- Je Tumi Rang Dekhoni (2011)
- Kabitasangraha (2011)
- Tumi Chhara Ar Kon Shalare Ami Care Kari (2016)
- Sadaruddin (2018)

=== Plays ===
- Prajapatir Leelalasya (1972)

=== Translations ===
- Arthashastra Paryalochanar Ekti Bhoomika (2010) (Translation of A Contribution to the Critique of Political Economy by Karl Marx, 1859)
- Khun Habar Dui Rakam Paddhati (2011) (Translation of Roque Dalton's poems)
