= Shamim Sikder =

Bangladeshi sculptor (1953–2023)

- শামীম সিকদার
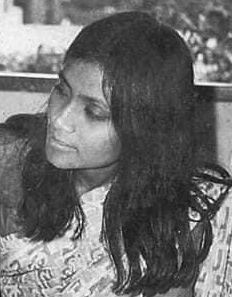
- Shamim Sikder
- Born: 22 October 1952; Bogura District, East Bengal, Dominion of Pakistan
- Died: 21 March 2023 (aged 70); Dhaka, Bangladesh
- Education: Bulbul Academy of Fine Arts; London Metropolitan University; University of Dhaka
- Occupations: Sculptor, Professor at the Faculty of Fine Arts, University of Dhaka
- Spouse: Zakaria Chowdhury (m. 1975; died 2021)
- Relatives: Siraj Sikder (brother)
- Awards: Ekushey Padak (2000); Prime Minister's Award for Sculpture (1974)

Shamim Sikder (22 October 1952 – 21 March 2023) was a Bangladeshi sculptor. Sikder served as a professor at the Faculty of Fine Arts, University of Dhaka between 1980–2001. She was awarded the Ekushey Padak in 2000 by the Government of Bangladesh.

== Early life and education ==
Shamim Sikder was born on 22 October 1952 in Bogura District, East Bangla Province, Dominion of Pakistan (Now Bangladesh). Her father Abdur Razzaq Sikder belonged to a prominent Bengali Muslim zamindar family from Chaygaon, Assam. Her family descended from the Nawabs of Murshidabad. She was raised in Dhaka with her six brothers and a sister. She was the sister of engineer Badsha Alam Sikder who was killed during the 1971 killing of Bengali intellectuals and Purba Banglar Sarbahara Party leader Siraj Sikder who was a Marxist revolutionary politician.

Sikder enrolled at the Bulbul Academy of Fine Arts at the age of 15. In 1971, she became the first graduate of Sculpture in Bangladesh from the Faculty of Fine Arts, University of Dhaka. In 1976, Sikder moved to the Sir John Cass School of Art in London (currently the School of Art, Architecture and Design of London Metropolitan University).

== Career ==
Sikder served as a professor at the Faculty of Fine Arts, University of Dhaka between 1980–2001. In 1974, she built a sculpture at Dhaka Central Jail to commemorate the country's founding president, Sheikh Mujibur Rahman. Other notable works include Shoparjito Shadhinota, at the Dhaka University Teacher-Student Centre in 1990 which commemorates the Bangladesh Liberation War.

In 1999 she inaugurated Swadhinata Sangram at Dhaka University's Fuller Road area. It comprises a park and is the largest sculpture in Bangladesh in terms of space. The sculpture depicts pivotal events in Bangladesh's history including the Bengali language movement, the Six point movement, 7 March Speech of Sheikh Mujibur Rahman, Operation Searchlight, Independence Day, and Victory Day. The sculpture is made with the faces of 16 martyrs who were killed in each movement. In addition, she has sculpted over a hundred works around the triangular road surrounding the sculpture, which include busts of eminent personalities such as Rabindranath Tagore, and Kazi Nazrul Islam, and portraits of Yasser Arafat, AK Fazlul Haque, and Maulana Bhasani.

Her works have been exhibited in both Bangladesh and abroad, most notably at the Commonwealth Institute in 1976 in London, United Kingdom. In 2000 she was awarded the Ekushey Padak by the Government of Bangladesh for her contribution to the arts. Her notable works include:

- Shoparjito Shadhinota (1990)
- Swadhinata Sangram (1999)

Shamim Sikder’s sculpture garden Shwadhinota Sangram was demolished after the fall of the Hasina regime on 5 August 2024. The sculpture included 103 miniature sculpture of prominent Bengali and international intellectuals along with Sheikh Mujibur Rahman's statue.

== Personal life ==
Sikder was known for her flamboyant trailblazing character. She would drive her motorbike, fashioned in her leather and denim jackets to commute to Dhaka University in the 1970s. She was married to Zakaria Chowdhury a Bengali language movement activist and Member of Parliament from Habiganj-2. Chowdhury was instrumental in forming the Haor Development Board by president Ziaur Rahman in 1977. He was also the publisher of The Manobkantha. She had two children with him, a son and daughter who currently reside in London. After her retirement in 2001, she moved to London, United Kingdom where she continued sculpting.

Shamim Sikder was a notable figure in Bangladeshi popular culture. Anthony Mascarenhas narrated in his book Bangladesh: A Legacy of Blood that Sikder had accused Sheikh Mujibur Rahman for the extrajudicial killing of her brother, revolutionary politician Siraj Sikder. She was allegedly the subject of Ahmed Sofa's novel Ardhek Nari Ardhek Ishvari (Half Women Half Goddess, 1995). Sikder was also a character in Humayan Ahmed's last novel Deyal in which he chronicles the socio-political crisis in the aftermath of the war of independence of Bangladesh.

== Death ==
In 2022 she returned to Bangladesh with the hopes of preserving her works including reconstructing Zainul Abedin's sculpture at the Faculty of Fine Arts, University of Dhaka. Sikder died on 21 March 2023, at the age of 70 in Dhaka. She is survived by a son and daughter who live in London, United Kingdom.

== Gallery ==
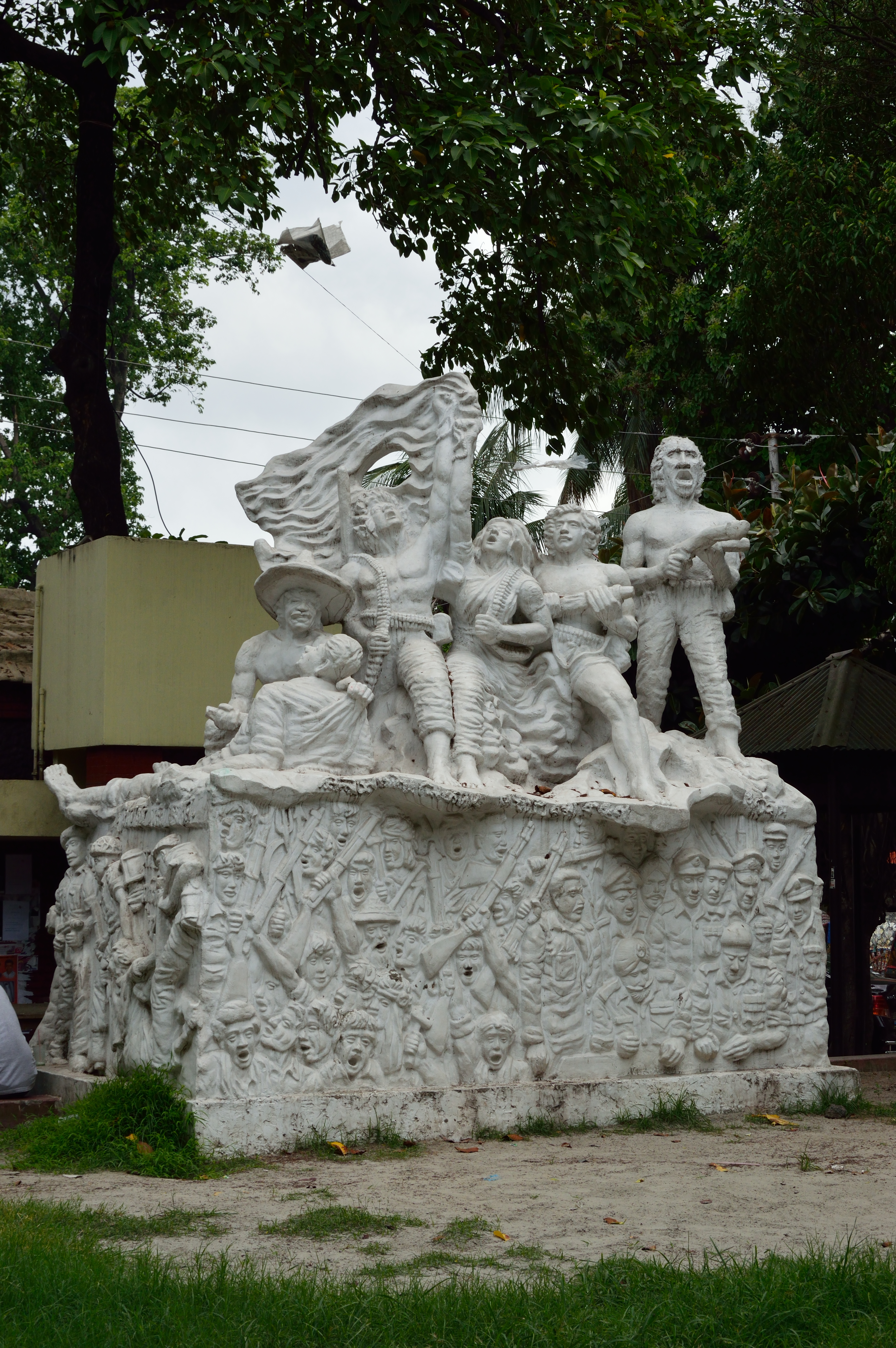
Shoparjito Shadhinota, TSC, Dhaka University

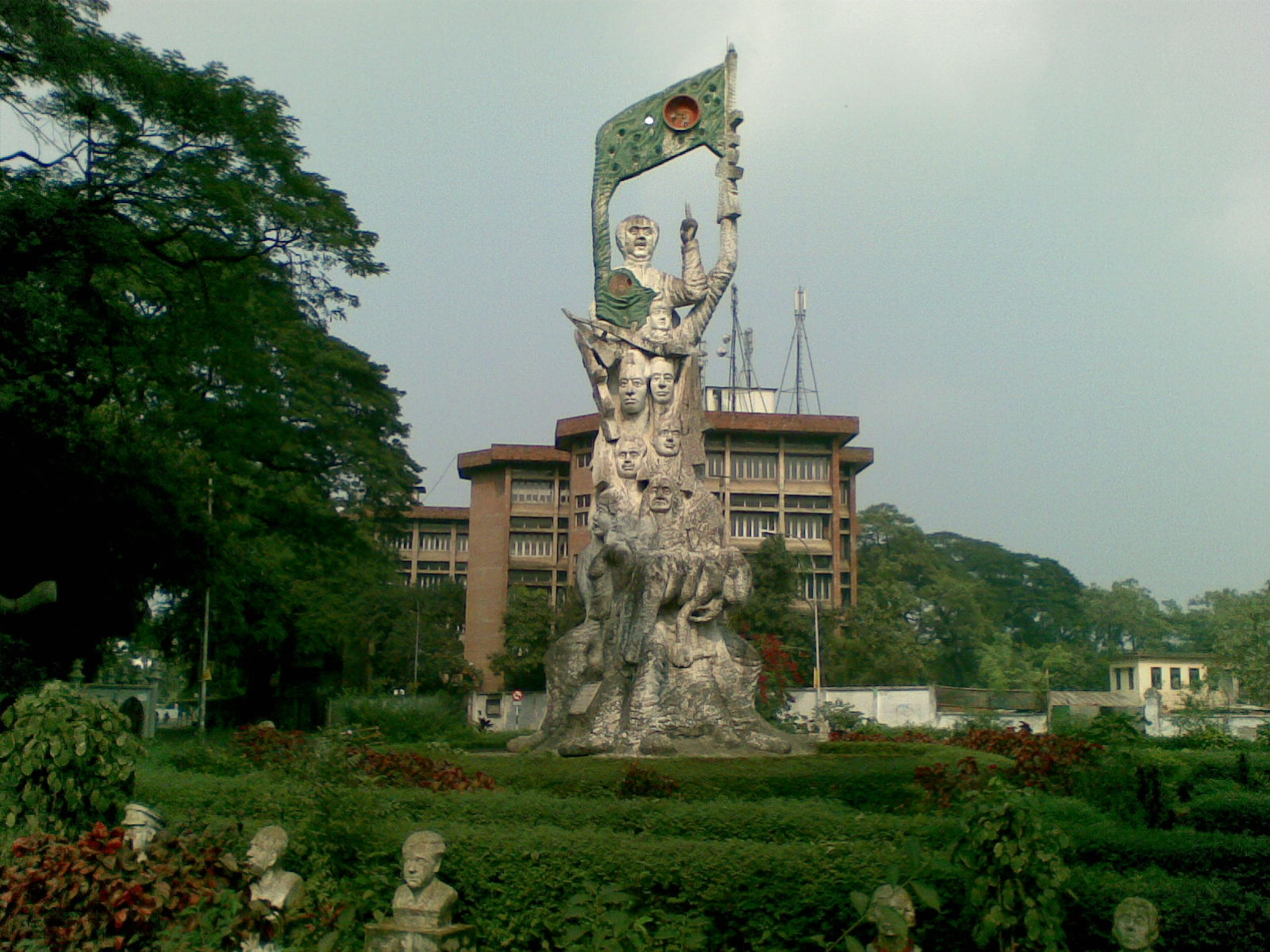
Swadhinata Sangram, Dhaka University

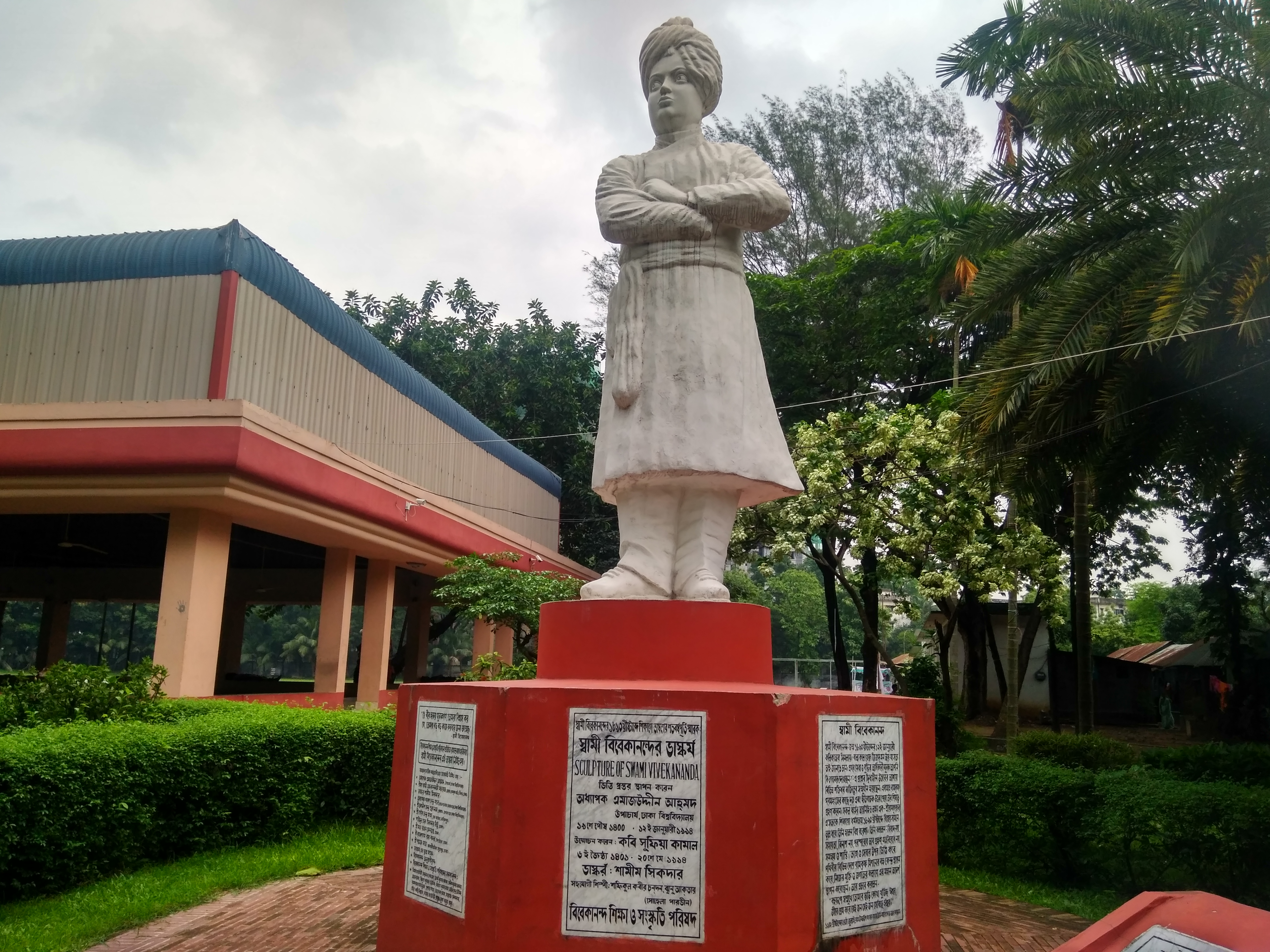
Swami Vivekananda, Jagannath Hall, Dhaka University

== Awards ==
- Ekushey Padak (2000)
- Prime Minister's Award for Sculpture (1974)
