= Nayakrishi =

Agricultural movement in Bangladesh

Movement logo

The New Agriculture Movement (Bengali: Nayakrishi) is an agricultural movement in Bangladesh that opposes the use of Western pesticides and genetically altered seeds.

The Movement began in response to environmental hazards that were believed to have been started by the use of insecticides and nematicides in the growing of crops.

In addition to health concerns the movement strongly promotes organic farming, and the use for food and animal fodder of plants which are often regarded as weeds. This is seen as both furthering self-sufficiency and distancing Bangladesh from Western development firms and the International Monetary Fund.

Nayakrishi has a special emphasis on supporting women, with a programme of supplying cattle to poor female-headed households which are kept until a calf is born, when the original animal is passed on to another family, and the organisation of the Specialised Women's Seed Network to collect seeds from local varieties of crops.

== See also ==
- Conservation movement
- Environmentalism
- Environmental movement
- Sustainable development
- Sustainability
