= Bhimruli =

- Location in Bangladesh
- Coordinates: 22°43′N 90°10′E
- Country: Bangladesh
- Division: Barisal Division
- District: Jhalokati District
- Time zone: UTC+6 (Bangladesh Time)
- Postal code: 8400

Bhimruli is a village in Jhalokati District in the Barisal Division of southwestern Bangladesh.
