= Salimullah Khan =

Bangladeshi writer, academic, teacher and public intellectual

- সলিমুল্লাহ খান
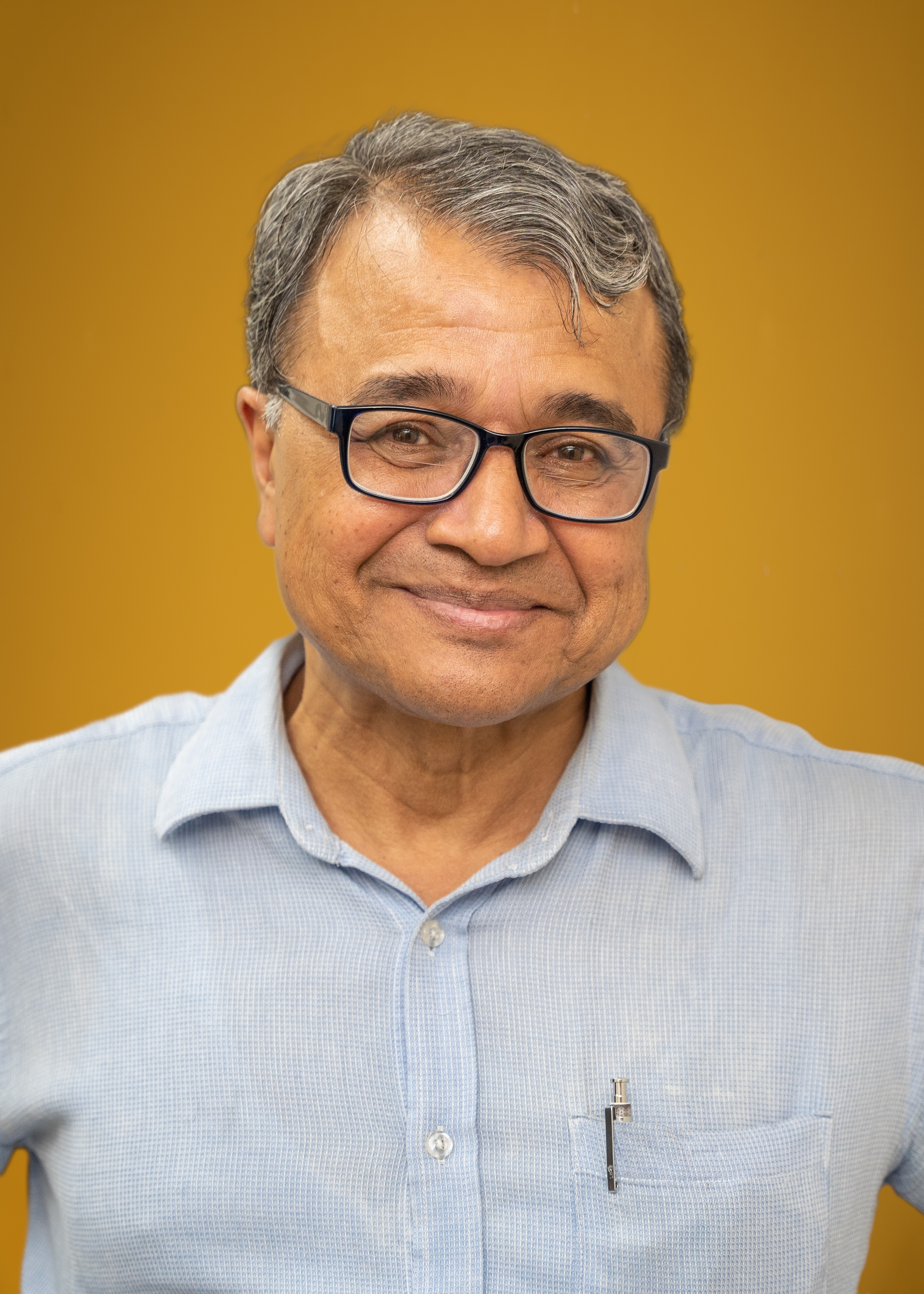
- Khan in 2022
- Pronunciation: [solimulːaʱ kʰan]
- Born: 18 August 1958 (age 68); Gorakghata, Maheshkhali, Cox's Bazar, Chittagong, East Pakistan, Pakistan (now Bangladesh)
- Citizenship: Bangladeshi
- Occupations: Academic; professor; writer; public intellectual
- Years active: 1983–present
- Works: Bibliography
- Awards: Full list
- Writing career
- Language: Bengali; English
- Period: Contemporary
- Genres: non-fiction, poetry, translation
- Notable works: Behat Biplab 1971, Adamboma, Swadhinata Byabsay

Academic background
- Education: University of Dhaka (LLB); The New School (PhD)
- Thesis: Theories of Central Banking in England, 1793–1877 (2000)
- Doctoral advisor: Duncan K. Foley
- Influences: Karl Marx; Sigmund Freud; Jacques Lacan; Frantz Fanon; Ahmed Sofa

Academic work
- Discipline: Law, economics, cultural studies
- Institutions: University of Rajshahi (1983–1984); University of Dhaka (1985–1986); State University of New York at Purchase (1988–1989); The City University of New York (1993–1998); East West University (2001–2002); Stamford University Bangladesh (2005–2012; University of Liberal Arts Bangladesh (2012–2025); North South University (2025-present)

Salimullah Khan (Note: Bengali: সলিমুল্লাহ খান, Bengali pronunciation: [solimulːaʱ kʰan].) (Bengali: সলিমুল্লাহ খান, pronounced [solimulːaʱ kʰan]; born 18 August 1958) is a Bangladeshi writer, academic, teacher and public intellectual. Khan explores national and international politics and culture using Marxist and Lacanian theories. Informed and influenced by Ahmed Sofa's thoughts, his exploration of Bangladesh's politics has a significant following among the country's young generation. Khan translated the works of Plato, James Rennell, Charles Baudelaire, Frantz Fanon, Dorothee Sölle into Bengali. In Bangladesh, he is a regular guest in talk shows on national and international political issues.

== Biography ==
Salimullah Khan was born to a Bengali Muslim family in Cox's Bazar district and grew up in Maheshkhali. Passing his Secondary School Certificate from Chittagong Cantonment High School and Higher Secondary School Certificate from Chittagong College, he studied law at the University of Dhaka. For a brief period, he was involved with the student wing of Jatiya Samajtantrik Dal. In 1986, he went to the United States, and did his PhD on Theories of Central Banking in England, 1793-1877 at the New School.

=== Academic career ===
Khan taught at the Department of Law, University of Rajshahi from 1983 to 1984, at the Institute of Business Administration, University of Dhaka from 1985 to 1986, and East West University from 2001 to 2002. He was a fellow at SOAS, University of London and Stockholm University. In 2006, he joined Stamford University Bangladesh, Bangladesh as a Professor in the Department of Law. Khan edited a periodical titled Praxis Journal from 1979 to 1986.

Khan was the director of the Centre for Advanced Theory at the University of Liberal Arts Bangladesh. Currently he works as a faculty member in Department of History & Philosophy at North South University. He is associated with a number of other organisations, such as the Center for Asian Arts and Cultures and Ahmed Sofa RashtraSabha.

== Writing career ==
A proponent of anti-colonial movements, Khan has engagements in the regional political economy and culture from a Lacanian-Marxist perspective. A critic of Western interventionism, Salimullah Khan analyzes Western thought and discourse through critical scrutiny of the colonial and imperial legacy of the West. From this perspective, he has written on the works of Charles Baudelaire, Walter Benjamin, Michel Foucault, Frantz Fanon, Claude Lévi-Strauss, Edward Said, Aime Cesaire, Talal Asad and many others. Since 1997, his engagement with Freud and Lacan has made him use psychoanalysis to explore Bangladesh's politics and culture, as well as international issues. He also wrote two books on Freudo-Lacanian philosophy: Freud Porar Bhumika, and Ami Tumi She.

=== Critiques ===
Khan's first book Bangladesh: Jatiyo Obosthar Chalchitro (1983) was a critique of Abdur Razzaq's famous lecture: Bangladesh: State of the Nation. Upon publication, it came under censure of Ahmed Sofa. Salimullah Khan wrote on Lalon Shah, Ramaprasad Chanda, Jasimuddin, Roquia Sakhawat Hussain, Ahmed Sofa, Abul Hasan, Tareque Masud and some of his contemporaries.

Khan views Kazi Nazrul Islam as an anti-colonial and democratic thinker cherished dearly by the people of Bengal. His book Ahmed Sofa Shanjibani provides an expansive assessment of the works of Ahmed Sofa. It established him as the leading expert on Sofa. He also edited a collection of writings by Ahmed Sofa on Rabindranath Tagore.

In a 2011 debate arranged by bdnews24.com, Khan critiqued the portrayal of the Bangladesh Liberation War in the film Meherjaan.

== Political views ==
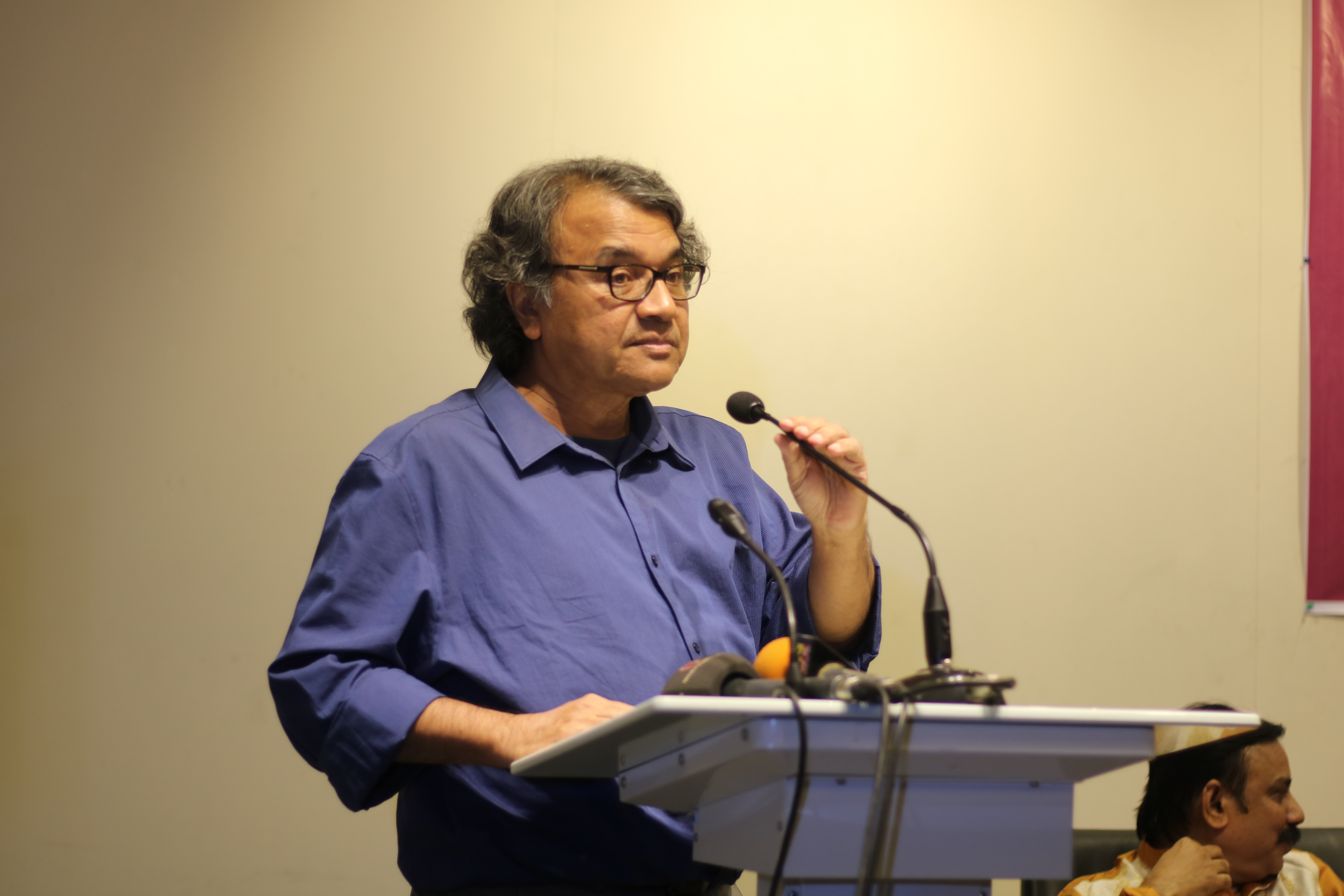
Khan in 2018

In his book Behat Biplab, Salimullah Khan analyzed the strategic and political aspects of the liberation war of Bangladesh. In Khan's view, the three fundamental principles of the liberation war of Bangladesh are equality, human dignity, and social justice.

During the Shahbagh Movement in Dhaka, Khan came forward in strong support of the war crime trial. He has intervened in recent debates on the number of martyrs in the Liberation War of Bangladesh.

Khan advocates for an inclusive education system in Bangladesh. In April 2017, as the government of Bangladesh took the decision to recognize the Dawra degree of the Qawmi madrasa system, Khan hailed the decision as important for integration of Qawmi group into the national mainstream. He discussed how Islam was propagated in Bengal through the medium of Bengali language.

Khan analyzes the issue of communalism and extremism from a historical perspective. and locates the origin of communalism in South Asia in the British colonial period. His analysis of communalism has also touched upon the Rohingya question. He denounced communal attacks and suggests that upholding social justice is critical to drive away communalism from the national arena. He defends the equal right of all communities to observe their respective religions, and believes that proper education and guidance is critical to dissuade the young generation from going down the path of extremism.

== Views on Bengali as a medium of education ==
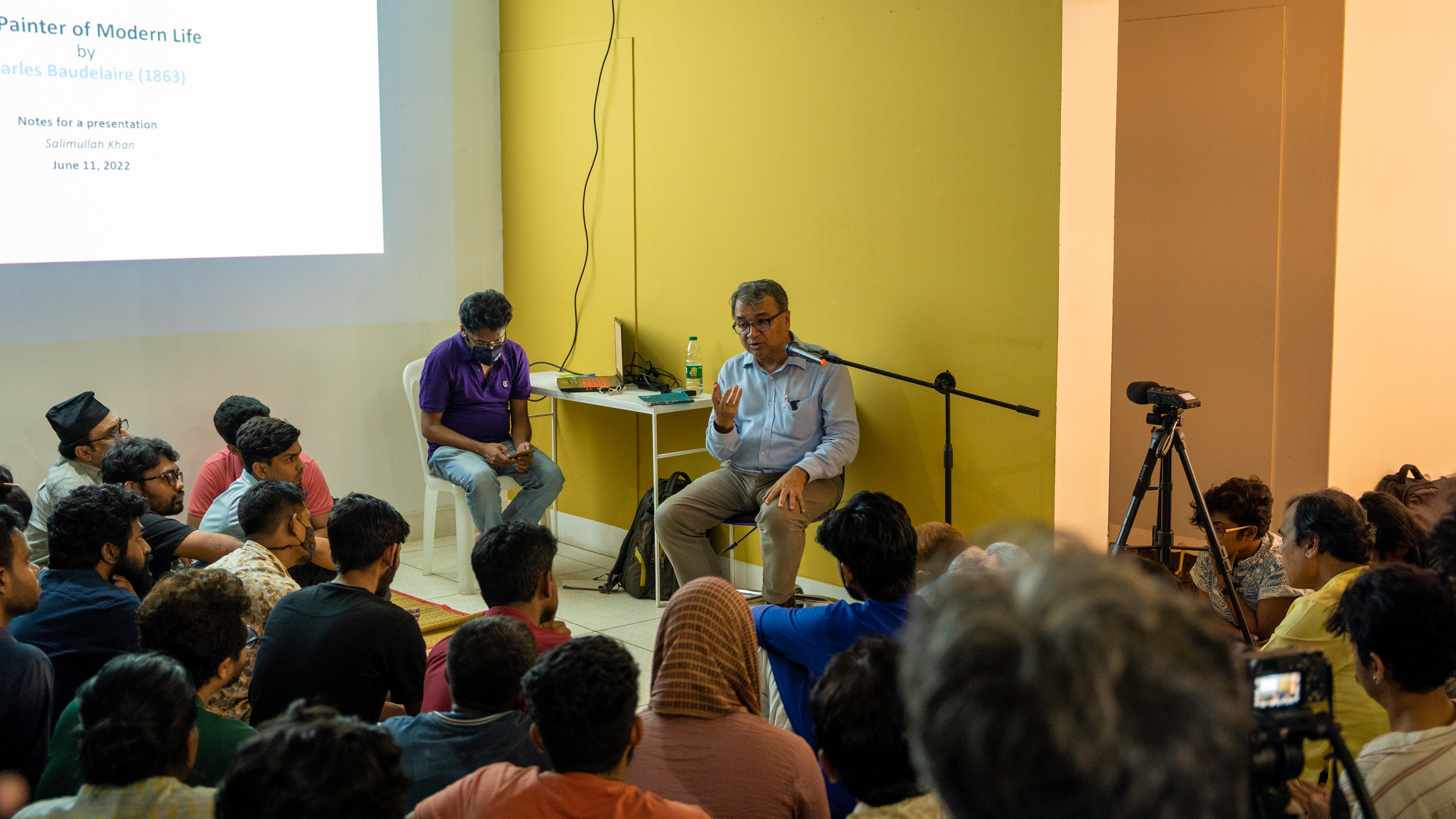
Salimullah Khan at a discussion

Khan is a leading advocate of Bengali to be the main medium of education in the Bangladeshi academia. He opined that without establishing Bengali as the main medium of education in all stages, the decolonization process would lag behind, and the Anglocentric colonial cringe would persist in the social dynamics in Bangladesh. In Bangladesh, the ruling class albeit admits Bengali to be the state language, their preference for English is apparent in their language application. Citing Freud and Lacan, he wrote that the people of the ruling class are pervert since their acts and thoughts do not reflect their words. He also called them traitors to the nation. Quoting a French proverb with puns in Bengali, he stated that until Bengali is not the medium of education in higher studies, the quality of education would stay medium, and in the realm of education, medium (quality) equals low. Compromise with the medium of language thus means the demise of quality in the domain of education, impeding progress of the nation as a whole. He also said that second languages should be taught to complement Bengali, not to supersede it.

Khan is a vocal critic of certain prescriptions on Bengali orthography. In his opinion, Bangla Academy has failed to perform its duty in publication of advanced knowledge in Bengali language.

== Bibliography ==
Essays

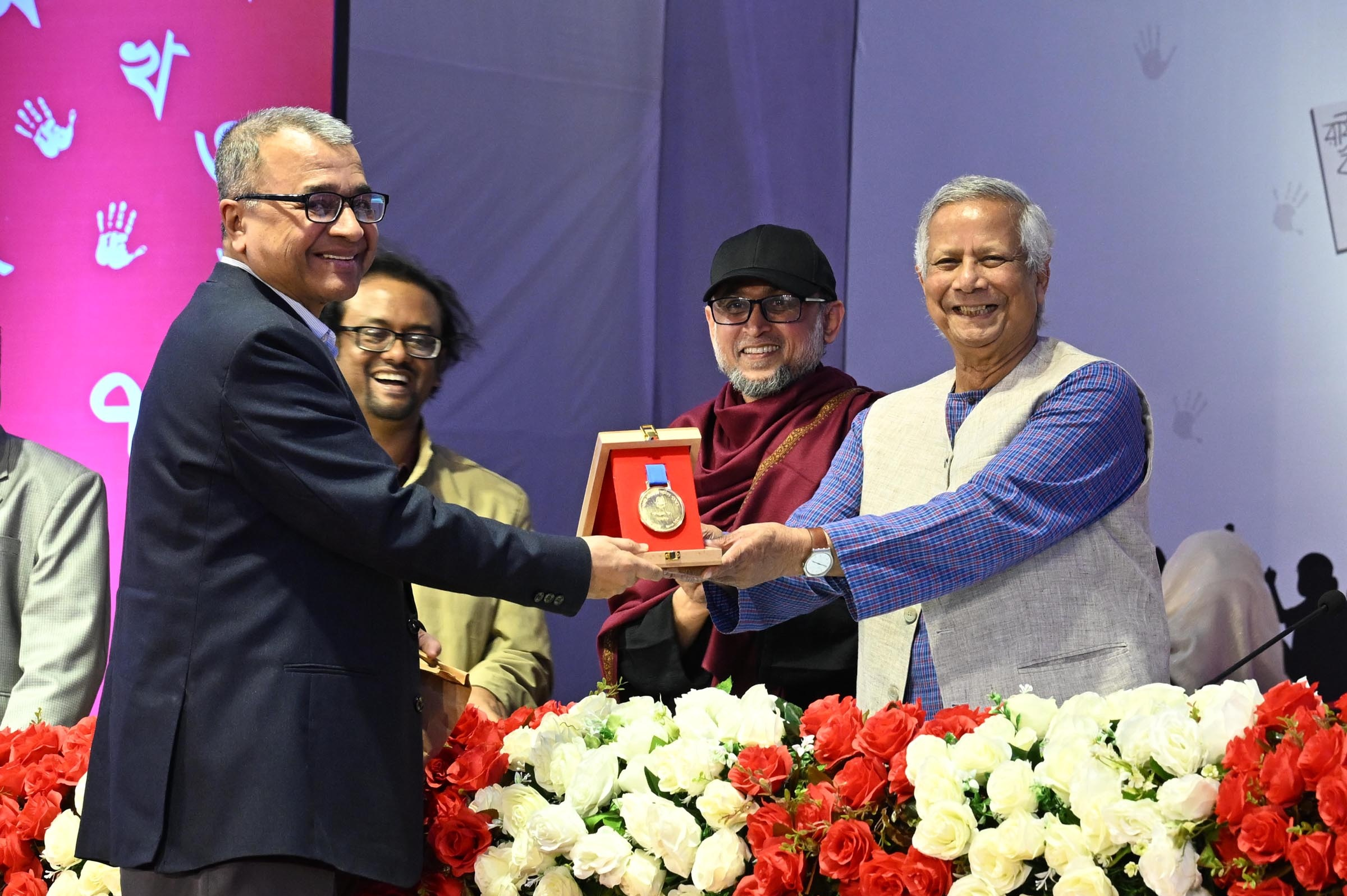
Khan receives Bangla Academy Literary Award 2025 from Chief Adviser Muhammad Yunus.

- Bangladesh: Jatiya Abasthar Chalchitra (1983)
- Freud Porar Bhumika, Ed. (2005)
- Satya Saddam Hussein and 'Srajerdaula' (2007)
- Behat Biplap 1971, Ed. (2007)
- Ami Tumi Se (2008)
- Silence: On Crimes of Power (2009)
- Adamboma (2009)
- Ahmed Sofa Sanjibani (2010)
- Swadhinata Byabsay (2011)
- Ahmed Sofar Swadesh, Ed. (2015)
- Gariber Rabindranath, Ed. (2017)
- Prarthana (2019)
- Amader Bhashar Nayak (2020)
- Thakurer Matsyanyay (2023)
- Utsarga: Paribar Prajati Rashtra (2023)

Poetry

- Ek Akasher Swapna (1981)

Translations

- Allahr Badshahi: Selected Poems of Dorothee Sölle (1998)
- Collected Works of Plato, V. 1 (2005) (Co-translated)
- Uhara Batase: Kabita 1958–1980 (2021) (Poems of Pentti Saarikoski)

== Awards ==
- Loke Literary Award: 2017
- Ranajit Award: 2020
- Bangla Academy Literary Award (2024)
