= Bangladesh Lekhak Shibir =

Bangladeshi literary and cultural organisation

- বাঙলাদেশ লেখক শিবির
- Emblem of Bangladesh Lekhak Shibir
- Formation: 1972; 54 years ago
- Founder: Ahmed Sharif; Humayun Kabir; Sardar Fazlul Karim; Ahmed Sofa; Serajul Islam Choudhury
- Type: Cultural Organization
- Location: Bangladesh
- President: Hasibur Rahman
- Vice president: Kazi Iqbal

Bangladesh Lekhak Shibir is a Bangladeshi literary and cultural organisation founded in 1972.

== History ==
Bangladesh Lekhak Shibir was established in 1970 as Lekhak Sangram Shibir by liberal Bengali writers Ahmed Sharif, Humayun Kabir, Sardar Fazlul Karim, Ahmed Sofa, and Serajul Islam Choudhury. It was renamed to Bangladesh Lekhak Shibir in 1972. In 1976 the organisation expanded to include dancers, painters, singers, and cultural activists. The organisation helped establish the cultural organisations collective 'Ganotantrik Sanskritik Front' (Democratic Cultural Front).
