= Tagore University of Creative Arts =

Private University In Bangladesh

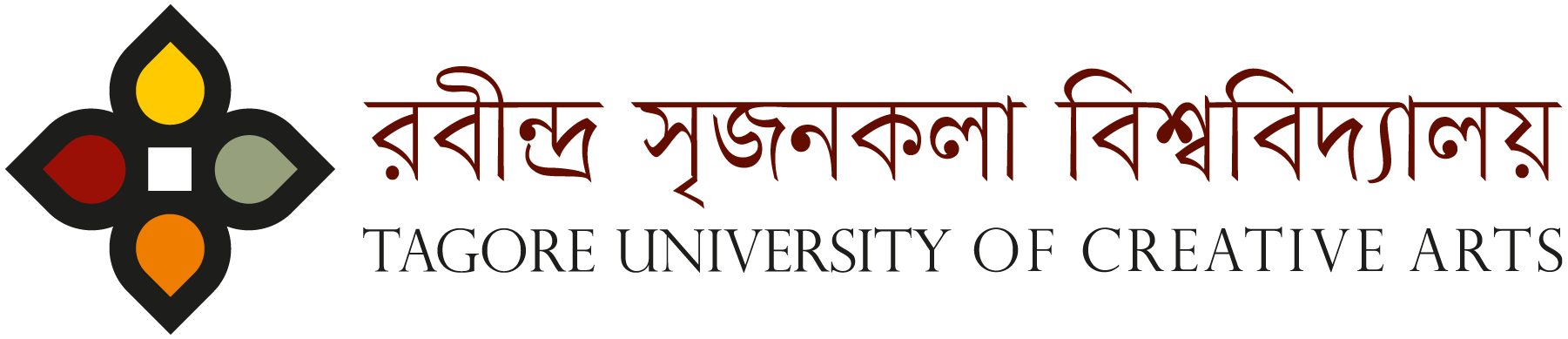
- Motto: The teaching of humanity is the ultimate teaching, and everything is subject to it.
- Type: Private
- Established: 2016
- Affiliations: UGC
- Chancellor: President Mohammed Shahabuddin
- Vice-Chancellor: Syed Mohammad Shahed
- Location: 97 Shah Makhdum Avenue, Uttara, Dhaka, Bangladesh; 23.8740°N 90.3836°E
- Nickname: TUCA
- Website: tuca.edu.bd

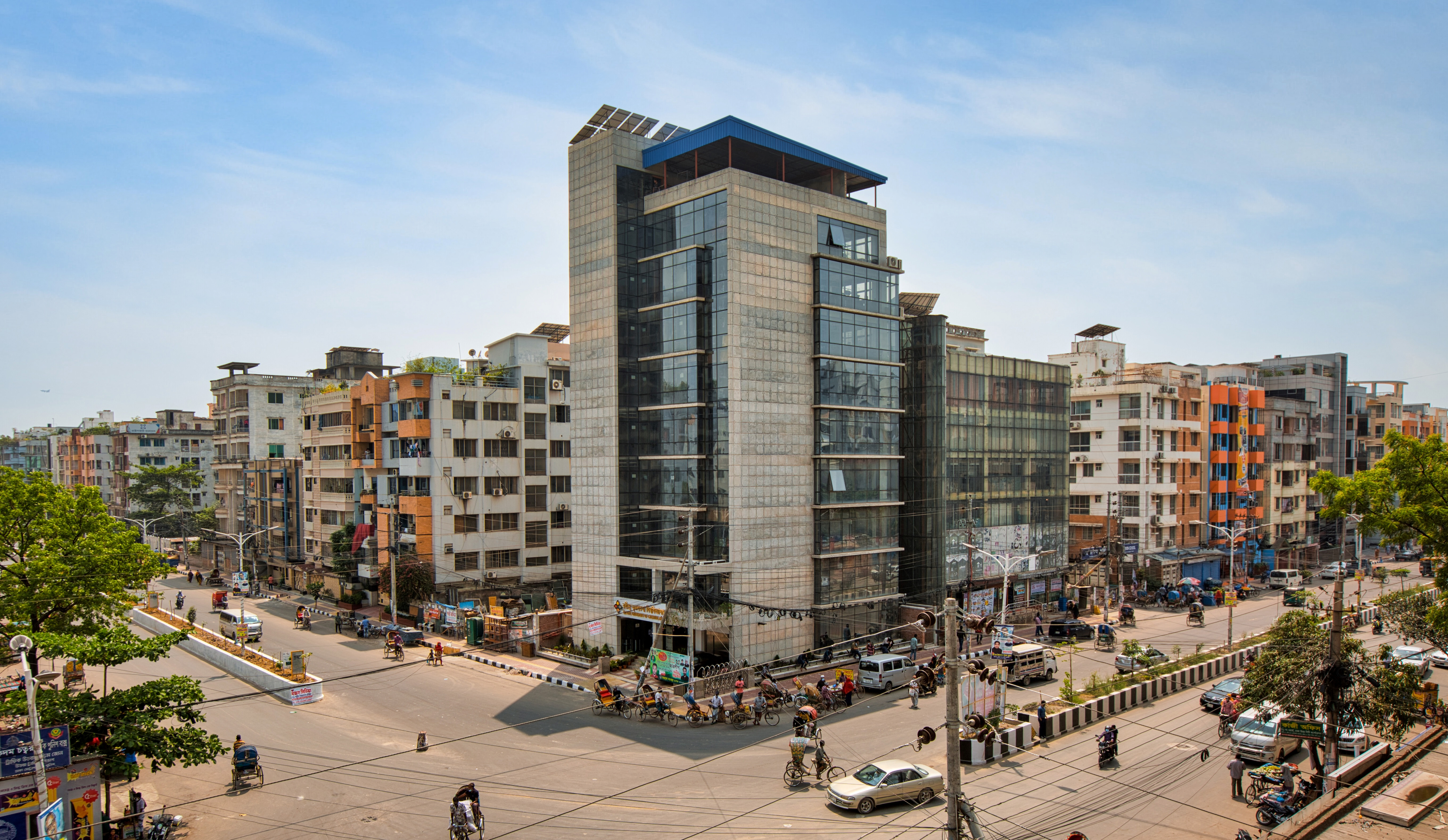
Campus building in Uttara

Tagore University of Creative Arts (TUCA; Bengali: রবীন্দ্র সৃজনকলা বিশ্ববিদ্যালয়) is a private university located in Dhaka, Bangladesh. The vice-chancellor of the university is Syed Mohammad Shahed.

== History ==
Tagore University of Creative Arts was established in 2016 by the National Professor Anisuzzaman who served as the founding president of the board of trustees. Former chairman of UGC Professor Nazrul Islam and icon of Tagore songs Rezwana Choudhury Bannya joined his efforts later. Tagore University of Creative Arts was approved on 7 June 2016 by the Ministry of Education of the Government of Bangladesh.

At present it is being regulated by a Trustee Board consisting of 14 members. Rabin Khan is its secretary and coordinating trustee. Retired professor of the University of Dhaka and former director general of Bangla Academy Syed Mohammad Shahed was appointed the vice-chancellor on 7 March 2019. On 12 August 2019, the University Grants Commission warned students against joining Tagore University of Creative Arts and 29 other private universities owing to alleged irregularities.

== Faculty and department ==
At present the university has five departments under three faculties.

Faculty of Service Arts

- Department of Music
- Department of Drama
- Department of Dance

Faculty of Design and Innovation

- Department of Fashion Design

Faculty of Business

- Business administration

== Gallery ==
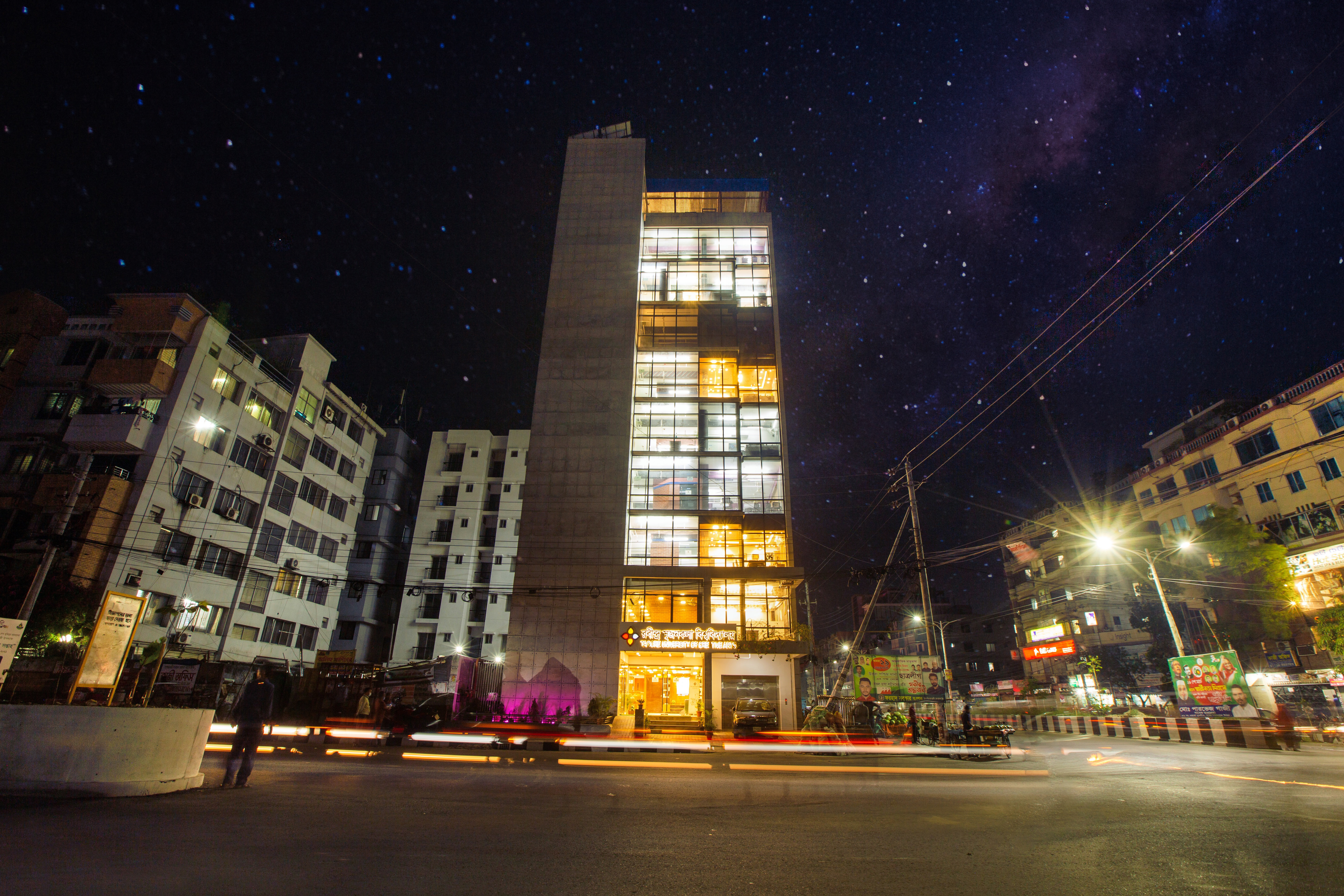
The image of campus at night
