= Shamsuzzaman Khan =

Bangladeshi academician (1940–2021)

- শামসুজ্জামান খান
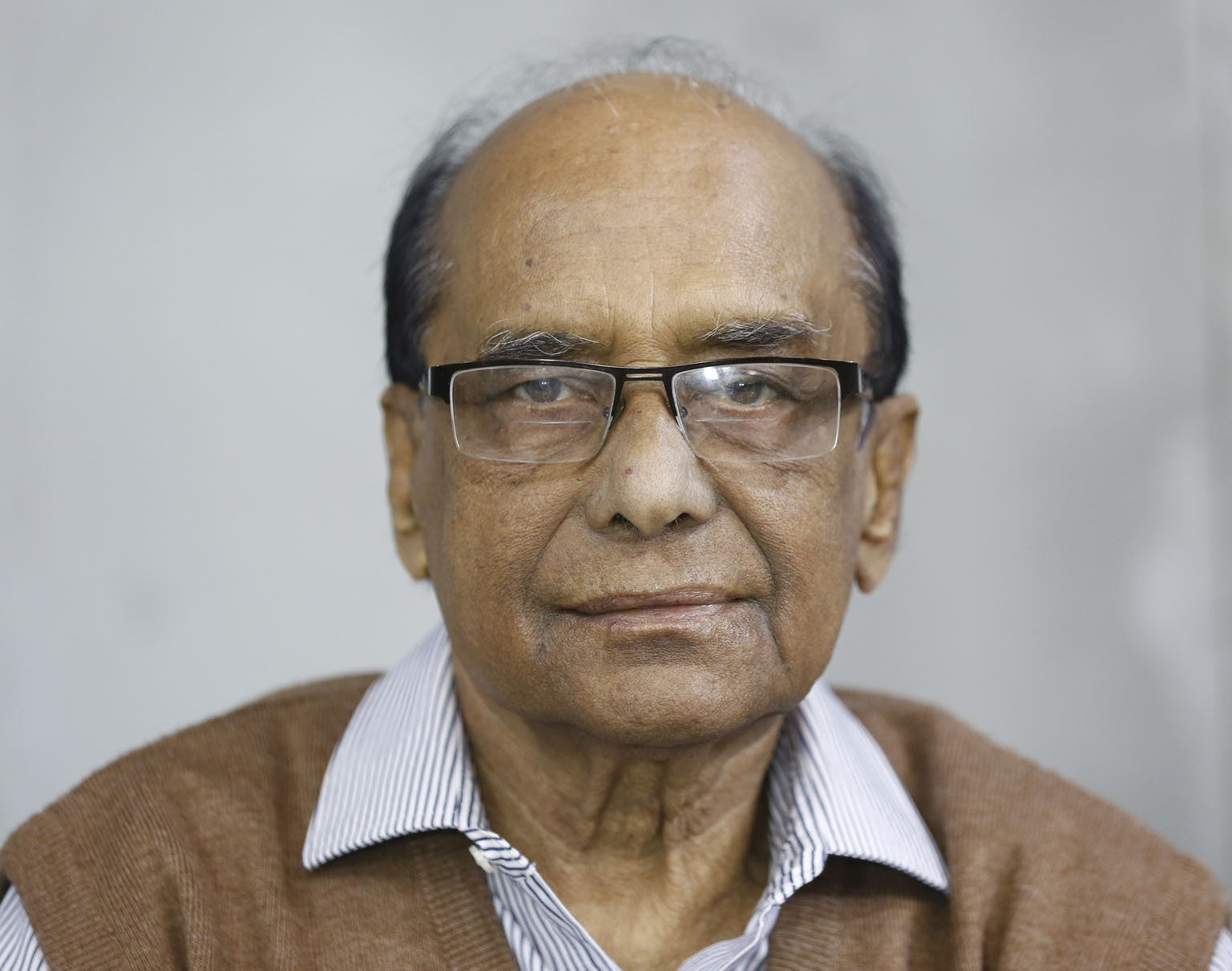
- Khan in Dhaka, 2019

President of Bangla Academy
- In office 29 June 2020 – 14 April 2021
- Preceded by: Anisuzzaman
- Succeeded by: Rafiqul Islam

Director General of Bangla Academy
- In office 24 May 2009 – 23 May 2018
- Preceded by: Syed Mohammad Shahed
- Succeeded by: Habibullah Siraji

Personal details
- Born: 29 December 1940 Manikganj District, Bengal Presidency, British India
- Died: 14 April 2021 (aged 80)
- Occupation: Academician, administrator, folklorist
- Awards: Bangla Academy Literary Award (2001); Ekushey Padak (2009); Independence Day Award (2017)

Shamsuzzaman Khan (29 December 1940 – 14 April 2021) was a Bangladeshi academician, folklorist, and writer who served as president of the Bangla Academy from June 2020 until his death in April 2021. He also served as the director general of the academy during 2009–2018. He was notable for editing book series on folk culture of 64 different districts in 64 volumes and collections of folklore series in 114 volumes. He was awarded Bangla Academy Literary Award in 2001, Ekushey Padak in 2009 and Independence Day Award in 2017 by the government of Bangladesh.

== Early life ==
Khan's father M.R. Khan was a translator at the government house of Calcutta. His great grandfather Elhadad Khan and his brother Adalat Khan were highly acclaimed intellectuals of colonial India. Shamsuzzaman's father died when he was only two. He was brought up by his mother and maternal grandmother.

Khan completed his honours and master's degrees from Dhaka University in 1963 and 1964 respectively and joined Munshiganj Haraganga College as a lecturer in the department of Bangla in 1964. In the same year he joined Jagannath College as an assistant professor.

== Career ==
Khan started his teaching career at Haraganga College. Khan was a faculty member of Jagannath College, Bangladesh Agricultural University (1968–73) and National University of Bangladesh (1998-2001).

On 24 May 2009, Khan became the director general of the Bangla Academy. His contract for the position was extended three times until 23 May 2018. He also served as the director general of the Bangladesh National Museum and Bangladesh Shilpakala Academy. On 1 October 2018 Shamsuzzaman Khan was appointed 'Bangabandhu Chair' Professor at Islamic University, Bangladesh in Kushtia.

According to Nobel Laureate Amartya Sen, "the critical judgment, historical insights and remarkable scholarship that Shamsuzzaman brings to his analyses and writings are altogether exceptional".

== Criticism ==
Khan was criticized and condemned severely since he allowed different organizations to arrange events in the English language in the premises of Bangla Academy in his tenure.

== Death ==
He died from complications of COVID-19 in Dhaka on 14 April 2021, during the COVID-19 pandemic in Bangladesh.

== Awards ==
- Bangla Academy Literary Award (2001)
- Ekushey Padak (2009)
- Independence Day Award (2017)

== Works ==
Khan wrote more than seventy books on topics ranging from serious literary articles and folklore to children's literature.

- Folklore: New Challenges (2015)
