= Abu Hena Mustafa Kamal =

- আবু হেনা মোস্তফা কামাল

Director General of Bangla Academy
- In office 13 March 1986 – 23 September 1989
- Preceded by: Quazi Manjoor-E-Mawla
- Succeeded by: Mahmud Shah Qureshi

Director General of Shilpakala Academy
- In office 1984–1986

Personal details
- Born: 11 March 1936 Sirajganj District, Bengal Presidency, British India
- Died: 23 September 1989 (aged 53) Dhaka, Bangladesh
- Education: Dhaka College; University of Dhaka; University of London
- Awards: Ekushey Padak

Abu Hena Mustafa Kamal (11 March 1936 – 23 September 1989) was a Bangladeshi songwriter, poet, essayist, critic and presenter. In his early life, he was a singer on East Bengal radio and television. He was a professor of Bengali literature at the University of Rajshahi in 1966 and became professor at University of Chittagong in 1973, also worked for the government as the Director General of the Bangla Academy from 1986 until his death. He was awarded Ekushey Padak by the Government of Bangladesh in 1987. He published only three collections of poetry before he died of a heart attack in 1989.

== Early life and education ==
Kamal was born in Gobinda village in Ullahpara Upazila, Sirajganj District. In 1959, he passed his MA in Bengali from the University of Dhaka. He received a Commonwealth Scholarship for his PhD on the Bengali Press and Literary Writings, 1818–1831, from the University of London in 1969.

== Academic career ==
Kamal was appointed as a reader in the Bengali Department at Rajshahi University at the age of 53.In 1973 he joined Chittagong University.
