= M. Harunur Rashid =

Bangladeshi academic (1939–2024)

- মোহাম্মদ হারুন-উর-রশিদ

President of Bangla Academy
- In office 4 February 2007 – 3 February 2009
- Preceded by: Wakil Ahmed
- Succeeded by: Kabir Chowdhury

Director General of Bangla Academy
- In office 6 February 1991 – 19 March 1995
- Preceded by: Mahmud Shah Qureshi
- Succeeded by: Abul Mansur Muhammad Abu Musa

Personal details
- Born: 28 December 1939 Tinsukia, Assam Province, British India
- Died: 26 November 2024 (aged 84) Dhaka, Bangladesh
- Education: MA in English literature
- Occupation: Teacher, translator, essayist, critic, columnist

M. Harunur Rashid (28 December 1939 – 26 November 2024) was a Bangladeshi academic, educational administrator, editor, and translator. He was a noted writer of Sufism and Sufi literature and a commentator of social, political, and literary texts.

== Early life and education ==
Rashid was born on 28 December 1939 to a Bengali Muslim family in Tinsukia district, Assam Province in British Raj. On the eve of the Second World War, his father, Rahimuddin Ahmed, an employee of the Assam Bengal Railway, was transferred to Chittagong. He spent his early childhood in the idyllic environment of the Pahartali and Chittagong hills. When the Japanese bombed Chittagong, his father sent them to his village home in Nabinagar, Brahmanbaria.

His family moved to Pahartali, and he read in the Pahartali Railway High School in 1947. Next year the family moved to Chittagong, and he was admitted to Chittagong Collegiate School. Here he read up to class nine, and, on his father's retirement, moved to Brahmanbaria town. He passed his matriculation examination from Annada Model High School in 1955. He was admitted to Brahmanbaria Government College, and passed his Intermediate in Arts examination (1957) under Dhaka University, standing 5th in the merit list.

He did his BA honours (1960) and MA (1961) at Dhaka University. He later went to the University of Cambridge (Fitzwilliam College), and obtained his BA honours (1966) and MA (1970).

== Career ==
During the interim government of Justice Shahabuddin Ahmed, he was appointed director general of the Bangla Academy on 7 February 1991. His appointment as the director general of the Bangla Academy was a landmark in his career as an educational administrator. He insisted on its research activities – chiefly the dictionaries which needed editing and branding. He published the Bangla Academy English–Bengali Dictionary (ed. Z R Siddiqui) and devised such marketing policies as made it an instant best seller. The cover design was made by artist and painter Qayyum Chowdhury, and all the dictionaries had the same design with a change of colour. He commissioned three dictionaries during his tenure and published them. He himself edited one pocket dictionary. The other thing he emphasized was the publication of complete works of literary celebrities, including Muhammad Shahidullah, Kaykobad, Farrukh Ahmed, and, most importantly, the complete works of Kazi Nazrul Islam.

After a stint of four years, he went back to Jahangirnagar University. He went on voluntary retirement in 1998. He took a break from teaching and became the chief editor of Dhaka Courier, a national English-language newsweekly. But his journalistic career was short-lived, and he joined North South University as an adjunct professor of English. He taught there for eight years and terminated his contract in December 2008. He then joined Darul Ihsan University as an adviser and professor of English. He taught at International Islamic University Chittagong at its Dhaka branch until 28 February 2015.

He was elected president of the Asiatic Society of Bangladesh in 1998 for two years. In February 2007, he was made the president of Bangla Academy for two years. He was unanimously elected chairman of Wild Team (Wild Life Trust of Bangladesh) on 5 August 2015.

== Personal life ==
Rashid married his cousin, Murshida Begum, when he was 24. He had two sons and a daughter by her. Murshida died of cancer in 1985. He married Shireen Yasmin Khan the following year. They had no children together.

A significant event in his life was his meeting a Sufi saint, Syed Rashid Ahmed Jaunpuri, the maternal grandson of Karamat Ali Jaunpuri, who preached Islam in Bengal and Assam in the 19th century. He accepted him as his murshid, and followed him, taking notes of his lectures. He learned the principles of Sufism sitting at his feet and practised the basics of Ma'refat without which, the guru emphasized, Islam could not be seen in its wholeness, beauty, and excellence. Later the notes came in handy in writing about his teachings. He wrote a total of five books on his lectures, which were published during his lifetime. He was with him for 13 years until his death in 2001. He published his collected lectures under the title Sanglap Samagra (2003). Nearly 12 years after his Shaykh's death, he published a magnum opus, Syed Rashid Ahmed Jaunpuri (RA) Smarak Grantha (2013).

Rashid died from cancer at the Ibn Sina Hospital in Dhaka on 26 November 2024, at the age of 84.
