= Abul Mansur Muhammad Abu Musa =

- আবুল মনসুর মুহম্মদ আবু মুসা

Director General of Bangla Academy
- In office 6 February 2002 – 5 February 2005
- Preceded by: Rafiqul Islam
- Succeeded by: Abul Kalam Manzur Morshed
- In office 19 March 1995 – 15 February 1997
- Preceded by: M Harunur Rashid
- Succeeded by: Syed Anwar Husain

Personal details
- Education: University of Dhaka
- Awards: Ekushey Padak

Abul Mansur Muhammad Abu Musa is a Bangladeshi academic and former Director General of Bangla Academy. He was awarded the Ekushey Padak for his contribution to Bengali Language.

== Career ==
On 19 March 1995, Musa was appointed the director general of Bangla Academy replacing Mohammad Harun-Ur-Rashid.

On 5 February 1997, Syed Anwar Hussain replaced Musa as director general of Bangla Academy.

Musa was reappointed the director general of Bangla Academy on 6 February 2002 replacing Rafiqul Islam. He was a member of Bangladesh Press Council led by Justice Abu Sayeed Ahammed.

Musa left director general of Bangla Academy position on 5 February 2005 and was replaced by Abul Kalam Monjur Morshed.
