= Mahmud Shah Qureshi =

Former Director General of Bangla Academy

- মাহমুদ শাহ কোরেশী

Director General of Bangla Academy
- In office 1 January 1990 – 5 February 1991
- Preceded by: Abu Hena Mustafa Kamal
- Succeeded by: M Harunur Rashid

Personal details
- Born: 12 October 1936 (age 89) Chittagong District, Bengal Province, British India
- Education: University of Dhaka
- Awards: Ekushey Padak

Mahmud Shah Qureshi (born 9 July 1936) is a Bangladeshi academic and former Director General of Bangla Academy. He established the Institute of Bangladesh Studies at the University of Rajshahi. He is a recipient of the Ekushey Padak. He is an expert of French Literature.

== Early life ==
Qureshi was born on 12 October 1936 in Chittagong District, Bengal Presidency, British India. He lived in Rangoon, Burma and moved to Chittagong around World War II. He graduated from Government Muslim High School, Sir Ashutosh Government College, and Chittagong College. He did his bachelor's degree and masters at the University of Dhaka. He did post graduate studies at University of Paris. He got his doctorate from the Paris-Sorbonne University.

== Career ==
In 1971, during the Bangladesh Liberation War, Qureshi served as ambassador of the Mujibnagar Government to Arab countries.

In 1973, Qureshi interpreted for André Malraux when he met the President of Bangladesh Sheikh Mujibur Rahman.

From 1972 to 1977, Qureshi was the president of the Bangladesh Linguistic Society, Chittagong. From 1973 to 1975, he was the head of the Department of languages at the University of Chittagong.

From 1977 to 1997, Qureshi was a professor at the Institute of Bangladesh Studies at the University of Rajshahi.

Qureshi was in charge of translation for the OIC Foreign Ministers' Conference held in Dhaka in 1982.

On 1 January 1990, Qureshi served as the Director General of Bangla Academy from 1 January 1990 until 5 February 1991. He established the department of English at Gono Bishwabidyalay. He served as the Dean of the Faculty of Arts and Social Sciences at the university.
