= Mohammad Nurul Huda =

Bangladeshi poet and novelist (Born: 1939)

- মুহম্মদ নুরুল হুদা
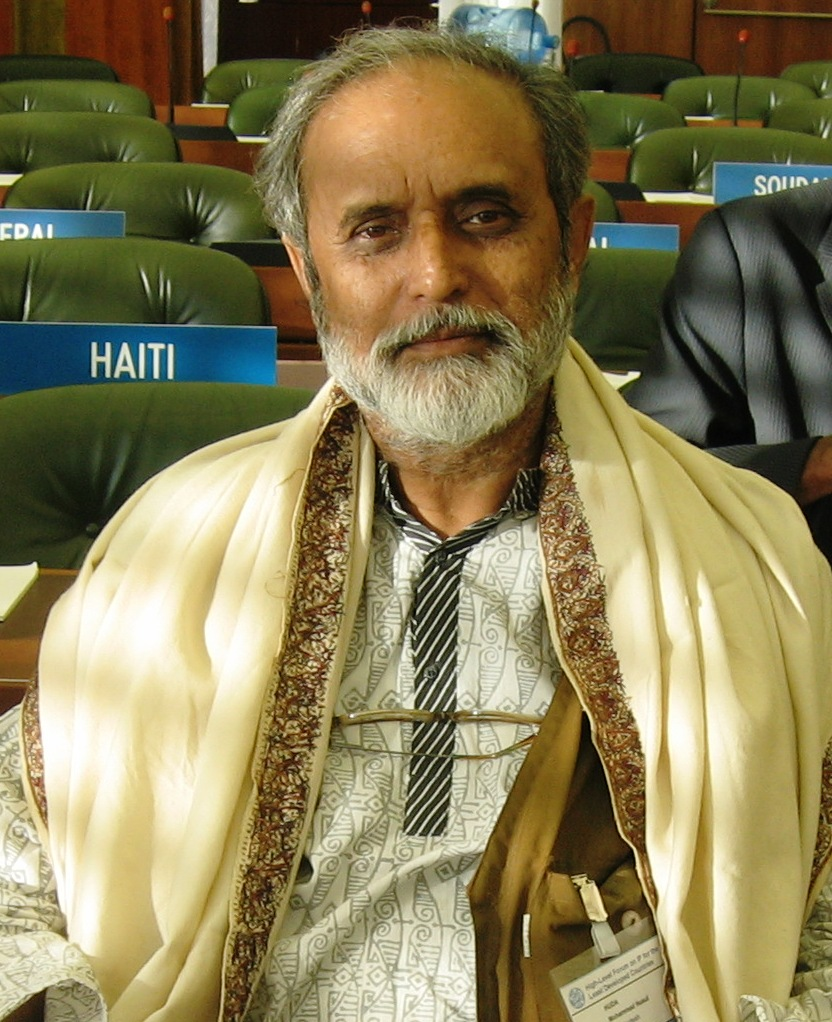
- Huda in 2007

Director General of Bangla Academy
- In office 12 July 2021 – 11 July 2024
- Preceded by: Habibullah Siraji
- Succeeded by: Rashid Askari

Personal details
- Born: 30 September 1949 (age 77) Cox's Bazar, East Bengal, Dominion of Pakistan
- Education: MA (English Literature)
- Alma mater: University of Dhaka

Mohammad Nurul Huda (born 30 September 1949) is a Bangladeshi poet, essayist, literary critic, translator and folklorist. He served as the Director General of Bangla Academy during 2021–2024.

Huda is dubbed as Jatisattar Kobi meaning "the poet of national identity". He was awarded the Ekushey Padak in 2015 and Bangla Academy Literary Award in 1988 by the government of Bangladesh. As of 2013, Huda has written more than fifty poetry books. His notable works include Amra Tamate Jati, Jonmojati, Moinopahar, Byangkumar, Chander Buro Chander Buri, Chhotoder Begum Rokeya, Chotoder Michael Madhusudan Dutt, Chhotoder Rabindra Jiboni, Chotoder Ruposhi Banglar Kobi Jibanananda Das, Dekha Hole Eka Hoye Jai, Rajar Poshak, Rabindra Prokriti O Onanya, Sartre O Onyanya Prosongo, and Satbhai Chompa.

== Education ==
Huda was born on 30 September 1949 in Pokkhali village, Cox's Bazar District in the then East Bengal, Dominion of Pakistan to Mohammad Sekander and Anjuman Ara Begum (d. 2015).

== Career ==
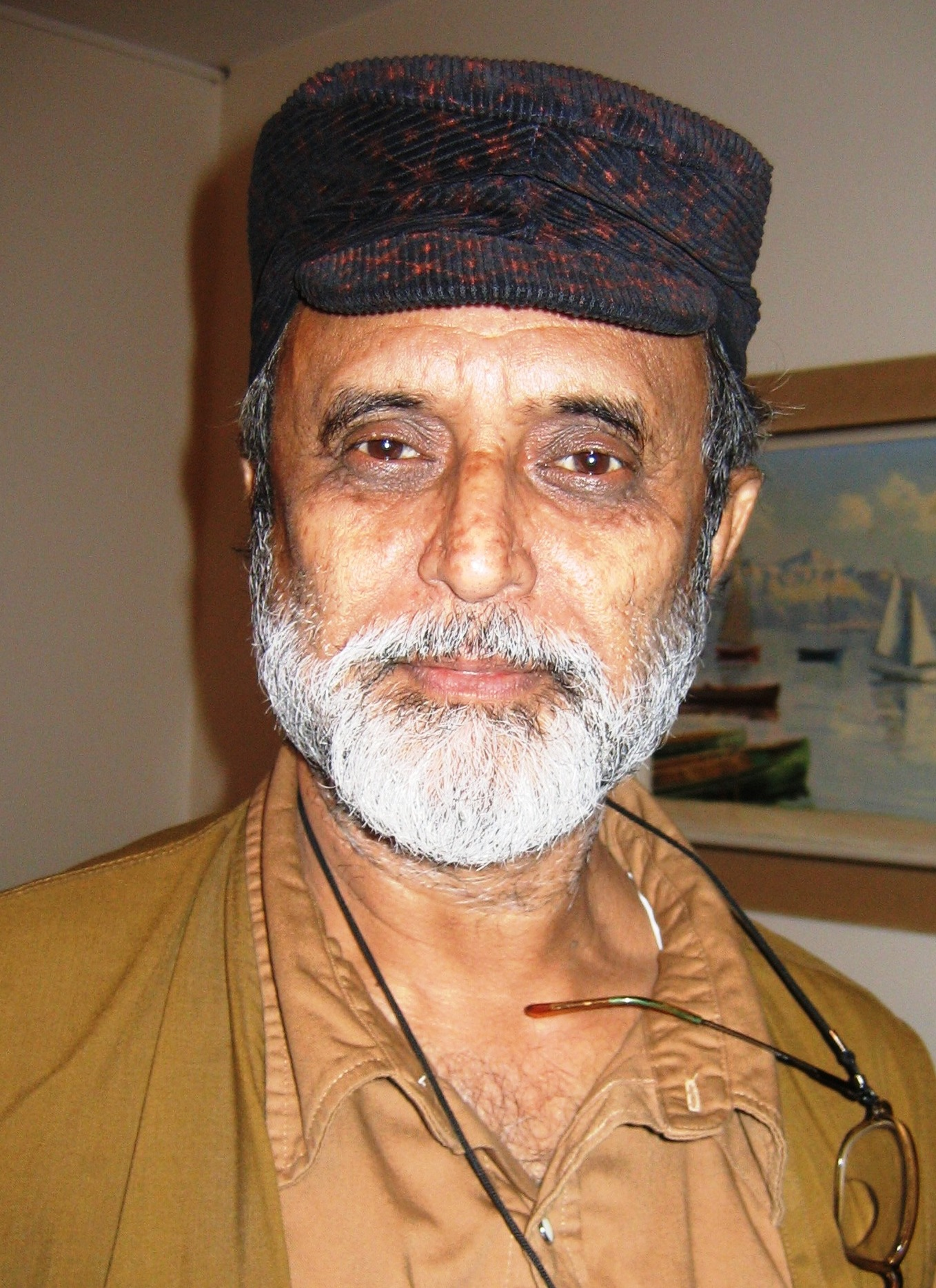
Huda in 2007

In 2007, after 34 years of service, Huda retired as a director of Bangla Academy. At the academy, he worked as the project director at Young Writers' Project.

Huda held the position of executive director of Nazrul Institute. He worked as member secretary of the Nazrul Birth Centenary Celebration Committee in 2021. After the incumbent Bangla Academy Director General Habibullah Siraji died on 24 May 2021, Huda was appointed by the government of Bangladesh for the vacant position on 12 July. Huda was the editor of arts.bdnews24.com in 2013.

Huda is a Fellow at Bangla Academy and member of American Folklore Society, International Society for Folk Narrative, and Asiatic Society of Bangladesh.

Huda has translated the poems of the Turkish poet Yunus Emre's poems, in collaboration with Arshaduzzaman, and also translated Nazrul's famous poems entitled 'Kemal Pasha' and 'Wardrum' into English. He was decorated with state honour as an outstanding personality contributing to the promotion of Turkish-Bangladesh relations by Süleyman Demirel, the President of Turkey, during his Bangladesh visit marking the silver jubilee celebration of independence of Bangladesh on 25 March 1997.

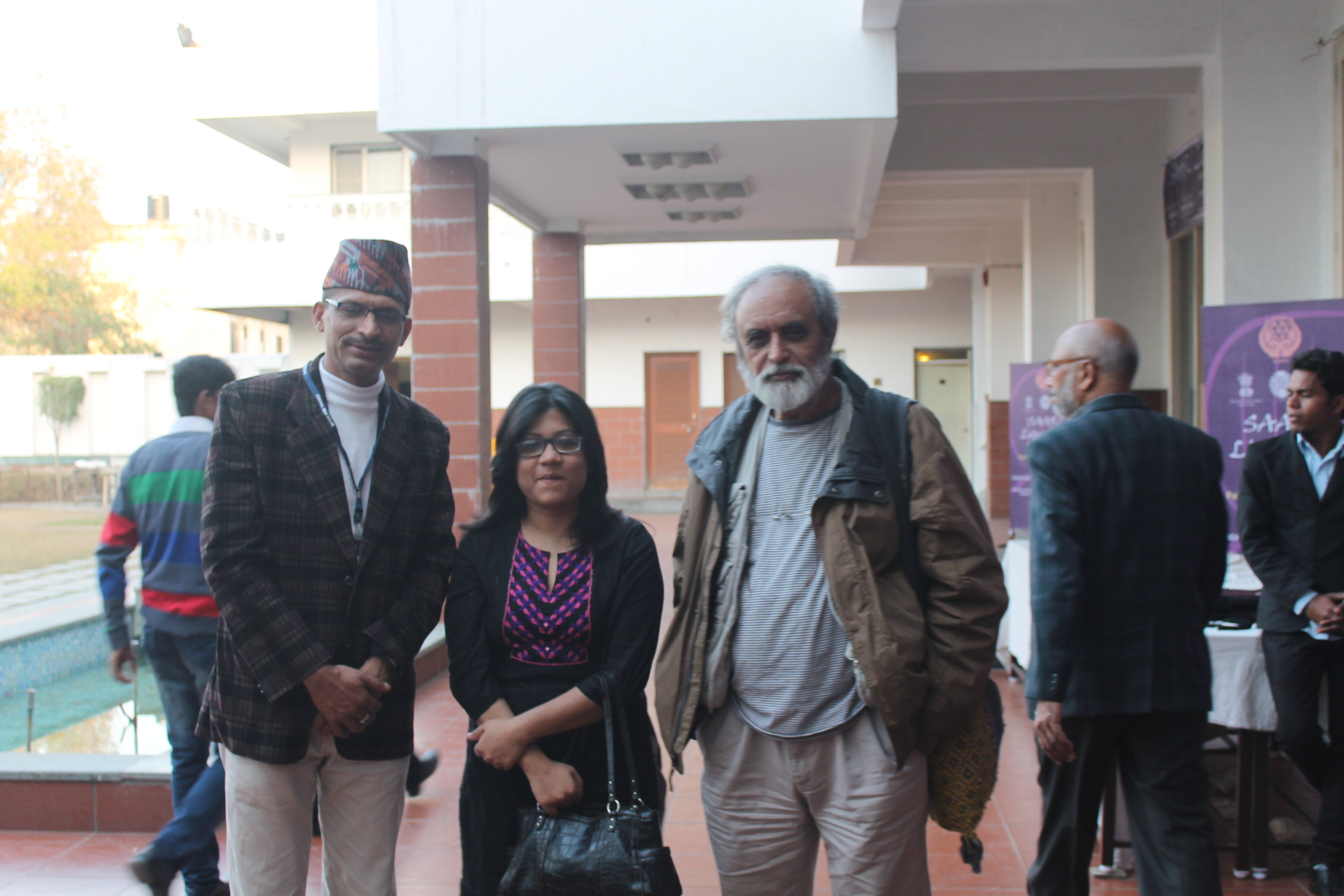
Huda with Nepali poet Suman Pokhrel and Bangladeshi poet Rahima Afrooz Munni during SAARC Festival of Literature - 2015 in Agra, India

== Awards ==
- SAARC Literary Award (2019)
- Ekushey Padak Award (2015)
- Mahadiganta Poetry Award Calcutta (2007)
- President's Honor from Turkey (1997)
- Poet of International Merit (ISP) (1995)
- Cox's Bazar Sahitya Academy Award (1989)
- Bangla Academy Literary Award (1988)
- Alaol Award (1985)
- Poet Ahsan Habib Poetry Award (1983)
- Jessore Sahitya Parishad Award (1983)
- Abul Hasan Poetry Prize (1983)
- Sukanta Award

== Journals and magazines ==
Journals-Magazines edited and compiled by Huda are as follows:

- Poiema (1980) editor, poetry magazine in English
- Bangla Academy Patrika (1983–1992) executive editor
- Studies (a bulletin on folklore from ICLCS, Dhaka, 1995) editor
- Kobita Club (little magazine, 1995), editor
- Nazrul Institute Patrika (from 1996 August to January 2001)
- Nazrul Institute Journal (from August 1997 to January 2001)
- Bangla Academy Journal (1983–2006 Sept.) executive editor

== Publications ==
More than 100 titles in total to Huda's credit as of February 2007. Some English titles are -

1. Selected Poems (poetry)
2. Flaming Flowers: Poets' Response to the Emergence of Bangladesh
3. Nazrul: an Evaluation (edited essays),
4. Poetry of Kazi Nazrul Islam in English Translation (translated and edited with an introduction and notes),
5. Nazrul's Aesthetics and Other Aspects (essays),
6. In Blissful Hell (translation).
7. Wedding and Wild Kite (translation), Bangla Academy Journal (edited)
8. Poiema (edited). Nazrul Institute Journal (edited).
9. Methodology: Valuation of Identified TECs of Bangladesh
10. Traditional Cultural Expressions (manuscript: 2006)

=== Poetry ===
Huda published as many as fifty poetry books to his credit till February 2007 as listed below:

1. Shonite Somudropath (1972)
2. Amar Soshotro Shobdobahini (1975)
3. Shobhajatra Dravidar Proti (1975)
4. Ognimoyee He Mrinmoyee (1980)
5. Amra Tamate Jati (1981)
6. Shukla Shakuntala (1983)
7. Jesus Mujib (1984)
8. Nirbachito Kobita (1985) selected poems in Bengali
9. Honolulu O Onyananyo Kabita (1987)
10. Kusumer Phona (1988)
11. Baro Bochorer Golpo (1988)
12. Ek Jonome Lokkho Jonmo (1988)
13. Galiber Kache Khomaparthonapurbok (1989)
14. Ami Jodi Jolodas Tumi Jolodashi (1990)
15. Priyankar Jonyo Pongtimala (1992)
16. Jatisottar Kobita ( 1992) poems on nationhood
17. Yunus Emrer Kobita (1992) translations
18. Orokkhito Somoy (1993)
19. Telapoka (1993) rhymes
20. Bhindeshi Premer Kobita (1993) translations
21. Bhalobasar Bukpokete (1994)
22. Digonter Khosa Bhenge (1994)
23. Premer Kobita (1994) love poems
24. Lesbian Clouds and Other Poems (1994)
25. Bangla Academy Choraye Bornomala (1994) rhymes,
26. Priyo Pangtimala (1995),
27. Amar Kopaleo Somoyer Bhaiphonta (1995),
28. Mouladhunik (1995),
29. Mujibbari (1996),
30. Amar Churanta Shobdo Bhalobasa (1998),
31. Dekha Hole Eka Hoye Jai (1998),
32. Sicorax (1999),
33. Adishto Hoyechhi Ami Dirgho Jagorone (1999),
34. Smiritiputra (1999),
35. Hazar Kobita (2000) One Thousand Poems collected,
36. Kabyo Somogra (2001) Collected Poems,
37. Darianogor Kabyo (2001),
38. Swadhinatar Chora (2001) rhymes,
39. Pakhir Chora (2001) rhymes,
40. Satbhai Chompa (2001) rhymes,
41. Rajar Poshak (2001) rhymes,
42. Chander Buro Chander Buri (2001) rhymes,
43. Byangkumar (2001) rhymes,
44. Selected Poems (2003),
45. Padmaparer Dheusoar (2004),
46. Sursomudro (2005),
47. Punyobangla (2005),
48. Quorankabyo (2005) (Translation of Ampara in verse),
49. Somoi Maranor Golpo (2006),
50. Ami Ekti Khas Prajapatra Chai (2007).

=== Essays, researches and narrative prose ===
1. Shortoheen Shorte (1981) essays on literature and aesthetics,
2. Lokkhon Songhita (1982) Homoeopathic Matera Medica,
3. Bhesojo Udbhid (1982),
4. Flaming Flowers : Poets' Response to the Emergence of Bangladesh (1994) essay,
5. Rabinroprokriti O Onyanya Probandha (1988) Essays on literature and aesthetics,
6. Sartre O Onyanya Prosongo (1993) literary essays,
7. Praner Minar Shahid Minar (1994) prose description for juvenile,
8. Srishtishilota O Onnanya (1999) essays,
9. Nazrul's Aesthetics and Other Aspects (2001) essays,
10. Nandonik Nazrul (2001) essays on Nazrul,
11. Monpoboner Nao (2005) travelogue,
12. Identification, Valuation and Intellectual Property Protection of Traditional Cultural Expressions of Bangladesh ( A draft report of about 500 pages submitted to WIPO, Genva in January 2005),
13. Methodology : Valuation of Identified TECs of Bangladesh. Trial pint 2006, Lokbangla, Dhaka.

=== Fiction, travelogue and prose ===
- Mohanobi (1983) biography for children,
- Jonmajati (1994) novel based on history and legends,
- Bastuhara (1994) a novel based on Flannery O'Connor's story,
- Moinpahar (1995) a novel based reality and legends,
- Chotoder Nazrul Jibani (2001) biography for children,
- Chotoder Rabindra Jibani (2001) biography for children,
- Chotoder Begum Rokya (2001) biography for children,
- Chotoder Jibanananda Das (2001) biography for children,
- Chotoder Michael Madhusudan Datta (2001) biography for children,
- Monpoboner Nao (2005) travelogue

=== Translation ===
1. Poribortaner Pothe (1972) essay,
2. Agamemnon (1987) drama,
3. In Blissful Hell (1993) novel,
4. Flannery O'Connorer Golpo (1997) stories,
5. Romeo Juliet (1998) Shakespeare's story retold,
6. Neel Somudrer Jhor (1998) Shakespeare's story retold,
7. Wedding and Wild Kite (2001),
8. Hason Raja (Subtitles of a film, 2001).

=== Books edited and compiled ===
1. Kobi Madhusudhan (1984) editor, collection of essays,
2. Kovita 1390 (1984) editor, collection of poetry,
3. Shahid Buddhijibi Sharane Kobitaguccha (1984) editor, collection of poetry,
4. Humayun Kabir Racanabali (1984) editor, collected works of Humayun Kabir,
5. Kobita 1391 (1985) editor, collection of poetry,
6. Abul Hasaner Ogronthito Kobita (1986) one of the three editors of Abul Hasan's poetry collection,
7. Bangladesher Nirbacita Kobita (1988) editor, Selected Poems from Bangladesh,
8. Homoeopathy Paribhasha (1989) one of the two compilers,
9. Kobita : GonoAndolan (1991) editor, collection of poetry,
10. Tales to Tell (1991) editor and compiler of a supplementary Reader in English for secondary level,
11. Stories for the Young (1991) editor and compiler of a supplementary Reader in English for secondary level,
12. Bangla Academy English-Bengali Dictionary (1993) a compiler,
13. Shotabdir Sreshtho Premer Pongkti (1995) editor, best love poems of the century,
14. Songkhipto Bangla Obhidhan (1995), a compiler of this dictionary,
15. Jatiya Prjaye Nazrul Janmabarshiki Udjapan Smarakgrantha 1996 (1996),
16. Nazrul : An Evaluation (1997),
17. Nazrul Sangeeter Swaralipi Sangkalan (1997),
18. Adi Rekordbhittik Nazrul Sangeeter Bani Sangkalan (1997),
19. Nazruler Nirbachito Prabandha (1997),
20. Nazruler Harano Ganer Khata (1997),
21. Poetry of Kazi Nazrul Islam in English Translation (1997)
22. Nazrul Barshapanji (1998, 1999),
23. Janmashatabarshe Nazrulke Nibedita Kabita (1999),
24. Nazruler Maktab Shahitya (2001),
25. Nazruler Langal (2001),
26. Shatabdir Shreshtho Premer Kabita (Love poems edited, 2005),
27. Religious Study (English translator) for Class VI and V (2006, Bangladesh Text Book Board).

== Work on intellectual property ==
Huda has been working on matters relating to intellectual property since last few years. On 12 December 2007 he presented a seminal work at the Top Level Forum on Intellectual Property organised by the World Intellectual Property Organization (WIPO/OMPI), held in Geneva, Switzerland. The main focus of his paper was Traditional Knowledge (TK) and Traditional Cultural Expressions (TCE). He presented an estimation of the value of yearly transaction TCE in Bangladesh.
