= Habibullah Siraji =

Bangladeshi poet (1948–2021)

Habibullah Sirajee
- হাবীবুল্লাহ সিরাজী

Director General of Bangla Academy
- In office 20 December 2018 – 24 May 2021
- Preceded by: Shamsuzzaman Khan
- Succeeded by: Mohammad Nurul Huda

Personal details
- Born: 31 December 1948 Faridpur District, East Bengal, Dominion of Pakistan
- Died: 24 May 2021 (aged 72) Dhaka, Bangladesh
- Education: B.Sc in Engineering
- Alma mater: Bangladesh University of Engineering and Technology
- Occupation: Poet, engineer

Habibullah Sirajee (31 December 1948 – 24 May 2021) was a Bangladeshi poet. He was awarded Ekushey Padak in 2016 by the government of Bangladesh for his literary contribution. He was the director general of Bangla Academy from 20 December 2018 until his death. He was also president of Jatiya Kabita Parishad (National Poetry Council).

== Early life and education ==
Sirajee was born on 31 December 1948 at Rasulpur in Faridpur. He graduated in BSc. (Engineering) from Bangladesh University of Engineering and Technology in 1970.

== Awards ==
- Jessore Sahitya Parishad Award (1987)
- Alaol Literary Award (1989)
- Bangla Academy Literary Award (1991)
- Bishinu Dey Award (2007)
- Rupashi Bangla Award (2010)
- Kabitalap Literary Award (2010)
- Mahadiganta Award (2011)
- Bangabandhu Award (2013)
- Poet Fazal Shahabuddin Poetry Award (2016)
- Ekushey Padak (2016)
