= Abul Kalam Manzur Morshed =

- আবুল কালাম মনজুর মোরশেদ

Director General of Bangla Academy
- In office 24 February 2005 – 16 November 2006
- Preceded by: Abul Mansur Muhammad Abu Musa
- Succeeded by: Syed Mohammad Shahed

Personal details
- Born: 25 May 1938 Rajshahi District, Bengal Presidency, British India
- Died: 25 July 2023 (aged 85) Nakhalpara, Dhaka, Bangladesh
- Education: University of Dhaka

Abul Kalam Manzur Morshed was a Bangladesh academic, linguist, and former Director General of Bangla Academy.

== Early life ==
Morshed was born on 25 May 1938 in Rajshahi District, Bengal Presidency, British India. He completed his bachelor's and master's degrees in Bengali Language and Literature from the University of Dhaka in 1959 and 1961 respectively. He completed a second master's from the University of British Columbia in 1974 and his thesis was on the Noakhali dialect. He completed his PhD from the University of Edinburgh in 1982.

== Career ==
Morshed joined the University of Dhaka in 1964 as a lecturer.

On 24 February 2005, Morshed was appointed Director General of the Bangla Academy replacing Abul Mansur Muhammad Abu Musa.

Morshed served as the Director General of the Bangla Academy till 16 November 2006.

Morshed was awarded the Agrani Bank Shishu Academy Children's Literature Award, Bangla Academy Literary Award, and Ekushey Padak.

== Death ==
Morshed died on 25 July 2023 in Nakhalpara, Dhaka, Bangladesh. He was buried in Mirpur Intellectuals Graveyard.
