= Syed Mohammad Shahed =

Bangladeshi professor, researcher and writer

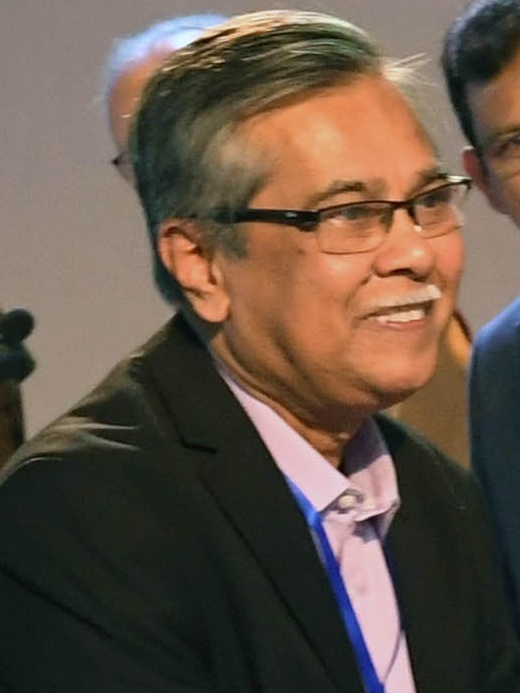
- Shahed receiving Bangla Academy Literary Award (2019)

Director General of Bangla Academy
- In office 13 May 2007 – 12 May 2009
- Preceded by: Abul Kalam Monjur Morshed
- Succeeded by: Shamsuzzaman Khan

Personal details
- Occupation: Researcher, professor, writer
- Awards: Bangla Academy Literary Award (2018)

Syed Mohammad Shahed is a Bangladeshi professor, researcher, writer and a former Director General of Bangla Academy. He received Bangla Academy Award in essay and research category in 2018.

Shahed obtained his Bachelor's, Master's and PhD from the University of Dhaka in Bangla language and literature. In 1988, he started his career as a faculty member in Bangla Department of the same university. From 13 May 2007 to 12 May 2009, he served as the Director General of Bangla Academy.
