= List of Bangla Academy Literary Award recipients (2020–2029) =

This is a list of the recipients of the Bangla Academy Literary Award from 2020 to 2029.

== 2020 ==
10 persons were awarded.

1. Ferdousi Mazumder (autobiography)
2. Muhammad Samad (poetry)
3. Imtiar Shamim (literary fiction)
4. Begum Akhtar Kamal (essay/research)
5. Suresh Ranjan Basak (translation)
6. Rabiul Alam (drama)
7. Anjir Liton ( children's literature)
8. Sahida Begum (research on Liberation War)
9. Aparesh Bandhopaddhaya (science fiction)
10. Muhammad Habibullah Pathan (folklore).

== 2021 ==
15 persons were awarded:

1. Asad Mannan (poetry)
2. Bimal Guha (poetry)
3. Jharna Rahman (literary fiction)
4. Bishwajit Chowdhury (literary fiction)
5. Hossain Uddin Hossain (essay/research)
6. Aminur Rahman (translation)
7. Rafiq-Um-Muneer (translation)
8. Sadhana Ahmed (drama)
9. Rafiqur Rashid (children's literature)
10. Panna Kaiser (research on Liberation War)
11. Harun-or-Rashid (Bangabandhu affairs research)
12. Subhagata Choudhury (science/science fiction/environmental science)
13. Sufia Khatun (autobiography/memoir/travel stories)
14. Haider Akbar Khan Rono (autobiography/memoir/travel stories)
15. Aminur Rahman Sultan (folklore)

== 2022 ==
15 persons were awarded.

1. Faruk Mahmud (poetry)
2. Tarik Sujat (poetry)
3. Tapas Majumder (fiction)
4. Parvez Hossain (fiction)
5. Masuduzzaman (essay/research)
6. Alam Khorshed (translation)
7. Milon Kanti Dey (drama)
8. Farid Ahmed Dulal (drama)
9. Dhruba Esh (children's literature)
10. Muhammad Shamsul Haque (research on Liberation War)
11. Subhash Singha Roy (research on Bangabandhu)
12. Mokarram Hossain (science fiction)
13. Ikhtiar Chowdhury (autobiography or travelogue)
14. Abdul Khaleq (folklore)
15. Muhammad Abdul Jalil (folklore)

== 2023 ==
16 persons were awarded.

1. Shamim Azad (poetry)
2. Nuruddin Jahangir (fiction)
3. Salma Bani (fiction)
4. Zulfikar Matin (essay/research)
5. Saleha Chowdhury (translation)
6. Mrittika Chakma (playwright)
7. Masud Pathik (playwright)
8. Toponkar Chakrobarti (children's literature)
9. Enam Ul Haque (environment/science)
10. Tapan Bagchi (folklore)
11. Sumankumar Das (folklore)
12. Eshak Khan (biography)
13. Afroza Parvin (Liberation War)
14. Asaduzzaman Asad (Liberation War)
15. Saifullah Mahmud Dulal (Bangabandhu Sheikh Mujibur Rahman)
16. Mujibur Rahman (Bangabandhu Sheikh Mujibur Rahman)

== 2024 ==
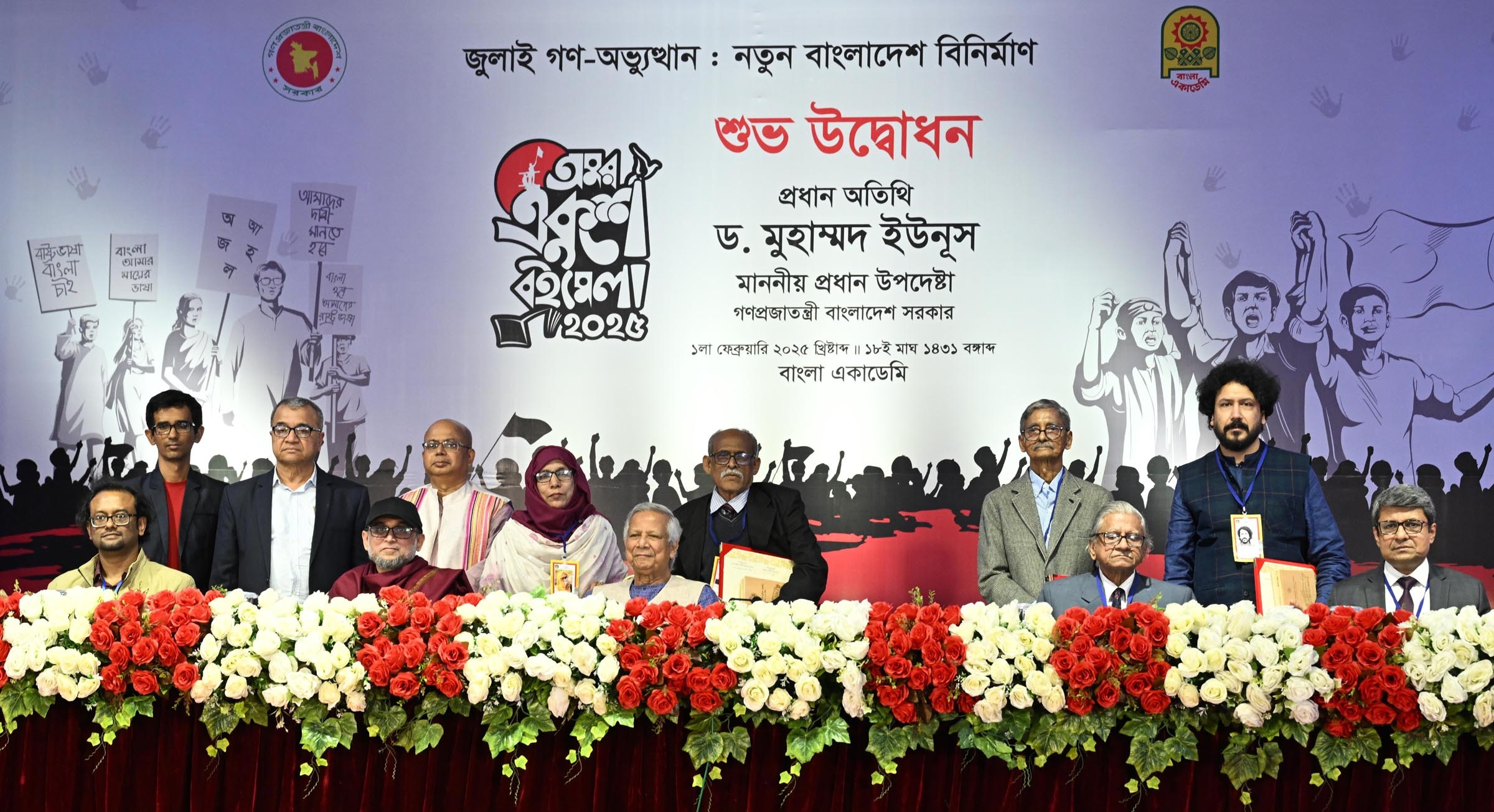
2024 winners

On 23 January 2025, Bangla Academy announced a list of 10 awardees. Two days later, the list was suspended. On 29 January, a new list was published excluding the names of three people from the original list.

1. Masud Khan (poetry)
2. Shubhashis Sinha (drama)
3. Salimullah Khan (prose)
4. G H Habib (translation)
5. Mohammad Shahjahan Mia (research)
6. Rezaur Rahman (science)
7. Syed Jamil Ahmed (folklore)

== 2025 ==
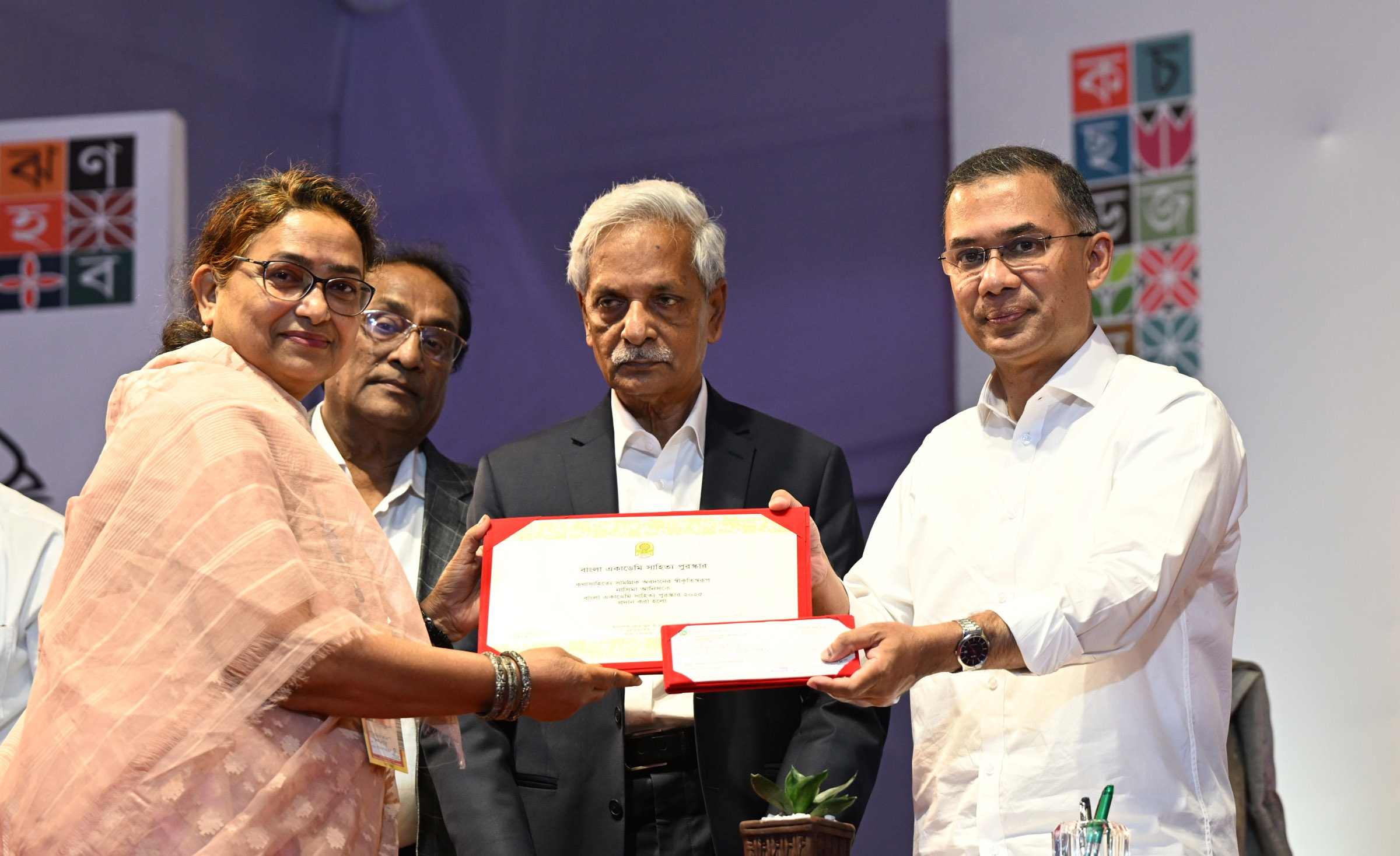
Nasima Anis receiving the award in fiction category

8 persons were awarded on 26 February 2026. Mohon Raihan’s award in the poetry category was withheld amid allegations.

1. Nasima Anis (fiction)
2. Syed Azizul Haque (essay and prose)
3. Hasan Hafiz (children’s literature)
4. Ali Ahmad (translation)
5. Mustafa Majid (research)
6. Israil Khan (research)
7. Farseem Mannan Mohammedy (science)
8. Moidul Hasan (Liberation War-themed writing)
