= List of Bangla Academy Literary Award recipients (1990–1999) =

This is a list of the recipients of the Bangla Academy Literary Award from 1990 to 1999.

== 1990 ==
1. Mohammad Abdul Qayum
2. Jahanara Imam

== 1991 ==
1. Bipradash Barua
2. Habibullah Siraji

== 1992 ==
1. Imdadul Haq Milan
2. Muntassir Mamoon

== 1993 ==
1. Bashir Al Helal
2. Khaleda Adib Chowdhury

== 1994 ==
1. Wakil Ahmed
2. Sikdar Aminul Haq

== 1995 ==
1. Syed Abul Maksud
2. Shahriar Kabir

== 1996 ==
1. Moinul Ahsan Saber
2. Syed Manzoorul Islam

== 1997 ==
None

== 1998 ==
1. Sanjida Khatun
2. Manju Sarkar

== 1999 ==
1. Nasreen Jahan
