= List of Bangla Academy Literary Award recipients (1970–1979) =

This is a list of the recipients of the Bangla Academy Literary Award from 1970 to 1979.

== 1970 ==
1. Ataur Rahman (poetry)
2. Satyen Sen (novel)
3. Hasan Azizul Huq (short story)
4. Anisuzzaman (essay-research)
5. Ibrahim Khalil (drama)
6. Atowar Rahman (juvenile literature)
7. Abul Kalam Shamsuddin (translation)

== 1971 ==
1. Hasan Hafizur Rahman (poetry)
2. Zahir Raihan (novel)
3. Jyoti Prakash Dutta (short story)
4. Mufazzal Haider Chaudhury (essay-research)
5. Anwar Pasha (essay-research)
6. Ekhlasuddin Ahmed (juvenile literature)

== 1972 ==
1. Abdul Ghani Hazari (poetry)
2. Mohammad Moniruzzaman (poetry)
3. Rashid Karim (novel)
4. Shahid Saber (short story)
5. Badruddin Umar (essay-research)
6. Kalyan Mitra (drama)

== 1973 ==
1. Fazal Shahabuddin (poetry)
2. Shahid Qadri (poetry)
3. Rabeya Khatun (novel)
4. Rahat Khan (short story)
5. Syed Murtaza Ali (essay-research)
6. Bulbon Osman (juvenile literature)
7. Kabir Chowdhury (translation)

== 1974 ==
1. Sufi Motahar Hossein (poetry)
2. Razia Khan (novel)
3. Sayeed Atiqullah (short story)
4. Abdul Haque (essay-research)
5. Mobashwer Ali (essay-research)
6. Sazedul Karim (juvenile literature)

== 1975 ==
1. Abul Hasan (poetry)
2. Shams Rashid (novel)
3. Minnat Ali (short story)
4. Ali Ahmed (essay-research)
5. Sayeed Ahmed (drama)
6. Abdullah-Al-Muti (juvenile literature)
7. Abdus Sattar (translation)

== 1976 ==
1. Matiul Islam (poetry)
2. Dilara Hashem (novel)
3. Sucharit Chowdhury (short story)
4. Sirajuddin Kasimpuri (essay-research)
5. Momtazuddin Ahmed (drama)
6. Foyez Ahmad (juvenile literature)
7. Sardar Fazlul Karim (translation)

== 1977 ==
1. Abdur Rashid Khan (poetry)
2. Mohammad Mahfuzullah (poetry)
3. Mahmudul Haque (novel)
4. Mirza Abdul Hai (short story)
5. Hasnat Abdul Hye (short story)
6. Momtazur Rahman Tarafdar (essay-research)
7. Zia Haider (drama)
8. Sukumar Barua (juvenile literature)
9. Abdul Hafiz (translation)

== 1978 ==
1. K. M. Shamser Ali (poetry)
2. Imaul Haque (poetry)
3. Razia Mazid (novel)
4. Rizia Rahman (novel)
5. Nazmul Alam (short story)
6. Shahid Akhand (short story)
7. Serajul Islam Choudhury (essay-research)
8. Abdullah al Mamun (drama)
9. Kazi Abul Kasem (juvenile literature)
10. Moniruddin Yusuf (translation)
11. Abder Rashid (translation)

== 1979 ==
1. Zillur Rahman Siddiqui (poetry)
2. Abu Zafar Obaidullah (poetry)
3. Abdus Shakur (short story)
4. Zahrul Haque (essay-research)
5. Ahmed Rafiq (essay-research)
6. Shamsul Haque (juvenile literature)
7. Abu Shahriar (translation)
