= List of Bangla Academy Literary Award recipients (2000–2009) =

This is a List of the Bangla Academy Literary Award recipients from 2000 to 2009.

== 2000 ==
None

== 2001 ==
1. Kaysul Haque (poetry)
2. Shamsuzzaman Khan (essay-research)
3. Ali Imam (juvenile literature)

== 2002 ==
1. Zahidul Haque (poetry)
2. Mobarak Hossain Khan (research)
3. Abu Saleh (juvenile literature)

== 2003 ==
1. Abdul Hye Sikder (poetry)
2. Saeed-Ur-Rahman (research)
3. Musharraf Karim (juvenile literature)

== 2004 ==
1. Amjad Hossain (novel)
2. Mojammel Hossain Mintu (short story)
3. Asaddor Ali (research)
4. Jafor Alam (translation)
5. Muhammed Zafar Iqbal (science)
6. Faridur Reza Sagar (juvenile literature)

== 2005 ==
1. Muhammad Zafar Iqbal (science)
2. Rezauddin Stalin (poetry)
3. Mokbula Manzoor (novel)
4. Abul Kalam Mohammed Zakaria (research)
5. Fakhruzzaman Chowdhury (translation)

== 2006 ==
1. Shamsul Islam (poetry)
2. Haripada Datta (novel)
3. Ali Anwar (essay)
4. Muhammad Ibrahim (science)
5. Mannan Hira (drama)
6. Amirul Islam (juvenile literature)

== 2007 ==
1. Manzoore Mawla (poetry)
2. Jatin Sarker (essay-research)
3. Lutfor Rahman Riton (juvenile literature)

== 2008 ==
1. Mahbub Sadik (poetry)
2. Karunamaya Goswami (essay-research)
3. Helena Khan (juvenile literature)

== 2009 ==
6 persons were awarded.

1. Arunabh Sarkar (poetry)
2. Rabiul Hussain (poetry)
3. Anwara Syed Haq (folk literature)
4. Abul Ahsan Chowdhury (research)
5. Rafiqul Haque (juvenile Literature
6. Sushanta Majumder (literature)
