= Vidyamoyee Govt. Girls' High School =

Girls' public secondary school in Bangladesh

- বিদ্যাময়ী সরকারি বালিকা উচ্চ বিদ্যালয়

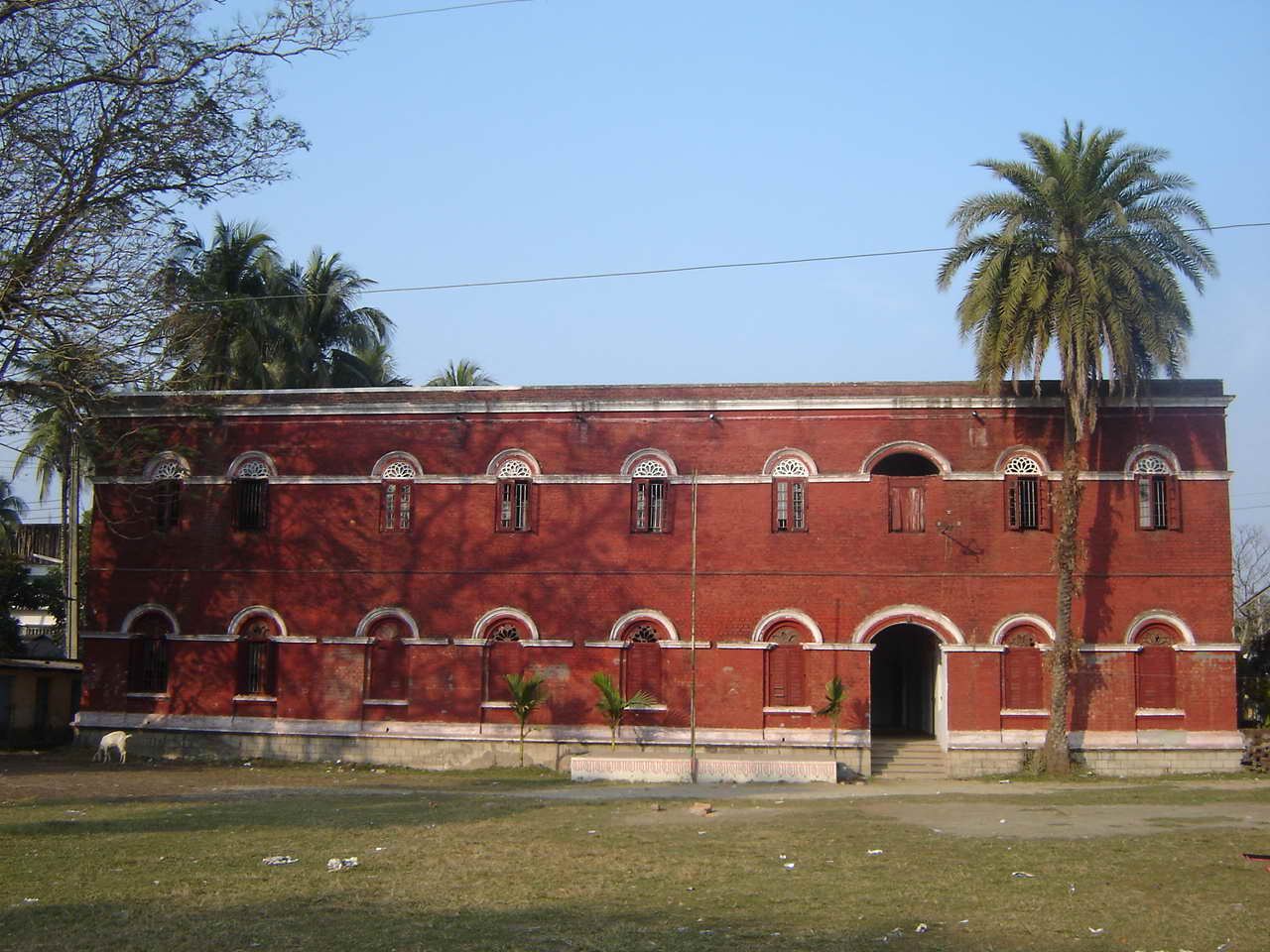
- Main building

Location
- Rambabu Road, Kotwali, Mymensingh Sadar, Mymensingh City, Mymensingh - 2200; Bangladesh; 24.757°N 90.4047°E

Information
- Type: Secondary School
- Motto: (Bengali: শিক্ষা শক্তি শৃঙ্খলা অগ্রগতি) (Education Power Discipline Progress)
- Established: 1 January 1873
- Founder: Jagatkishore Acharya Chowdhury
- School district: Mymensingh
- School code: 111842
- Headmaster: Nasima Akhter
- Faculty: Science; Humanities
- Teaching staff: 56
- Grades: Class 4 to 10
- Enrollment: 1350
- Campus: 3.52 acres (1.42 ha)
- Campus type: Urban
- Sports: Volleyball
- Board: Board of Intermediate and Secondary Education, Mymensingh
- Website: www.vidyamayee.edu.bd

Vidyamoyee Govt. Girls' High School (Bengali: বিদ্যাময়ী সরকারি বালিকা উচ্চ বিদ্যালয়) is a girls' public secondary school in Mymensingh, Bangladesh.The school was founded by Jagatkishore Acharya Chowdhury, the son of Vidyamoyee Devvya in 1873 during British Raj.

== Foundation ==
The school was founded by Jagatkishore Acharya Chowdhury, son of Vidyamoyee Devi, as a gesture of love to his mother. Other financial support came from the zamindars of Muktagacha, Gouripur and Krishnanagar.

== Notable faculty ==
- Jahanara Imam

== See also ==
- Mymensingh Zilla School
- Government Laboratory High School, Mymensingh
