= Mymensingh Zilla School =

- ময়মনসিংহ জিলা স্কুল

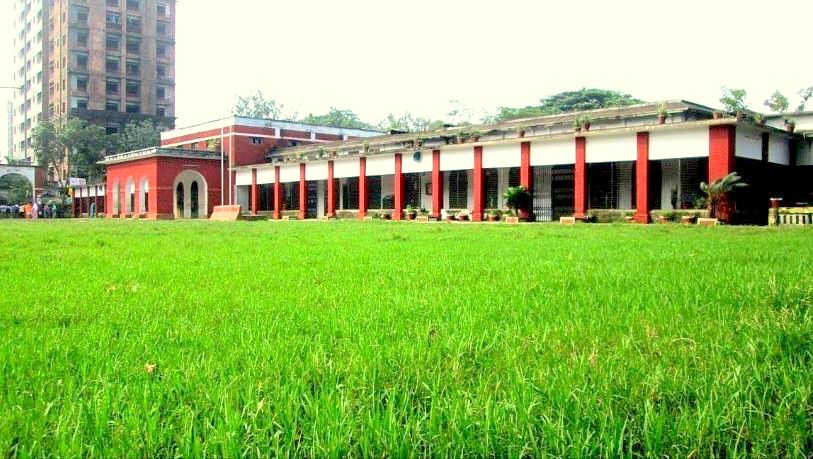

Location
- Zilla School Road, Sadar, Mymensingh; Bangladesh; 24.7598°N 90.3994°E

Information
- Type: Boys Public secondary school
- Established: 1853; 173 years ago
- School district: Mymensingh District
- Head teacher: Md.Abdus Salam
- Grades: Class 3 - 10
- Enrollment: 1828
- Campus type: Urban
- Colors: White Shirt; Khaki Pant
- Publication: ঐতিহ্য (School magazine)
- Board: Board of Intermediate and Secondary Education, Mymensingh
- Website: mzs.edu.bd

Mymensingh Zilla School (MZS) is a public secondary school for boys, located in Mymensingh, Bangladesh. The institution was established in 1846 during the British Raj under the name Hardinge School and was officially renamed Mymensingh Zilla School on 3 November 1853.

Originally founded as an English-medium institution, the school now follows the Bangla medium, with Bengali as the language of instruction. Since 1991, the school has operated in two shifts: the Morning shift runs from 7:30 am to 12:00 pm, while the Day shift runs from 12:30 pm to 5:30 pm.

The school comprises two nearby campuses: one houses the academic and administrative buildings, and the other was formerly used as a student hostel. Although the hostel is no longer used for accommodation, the facility is currently utilised for other purposes.

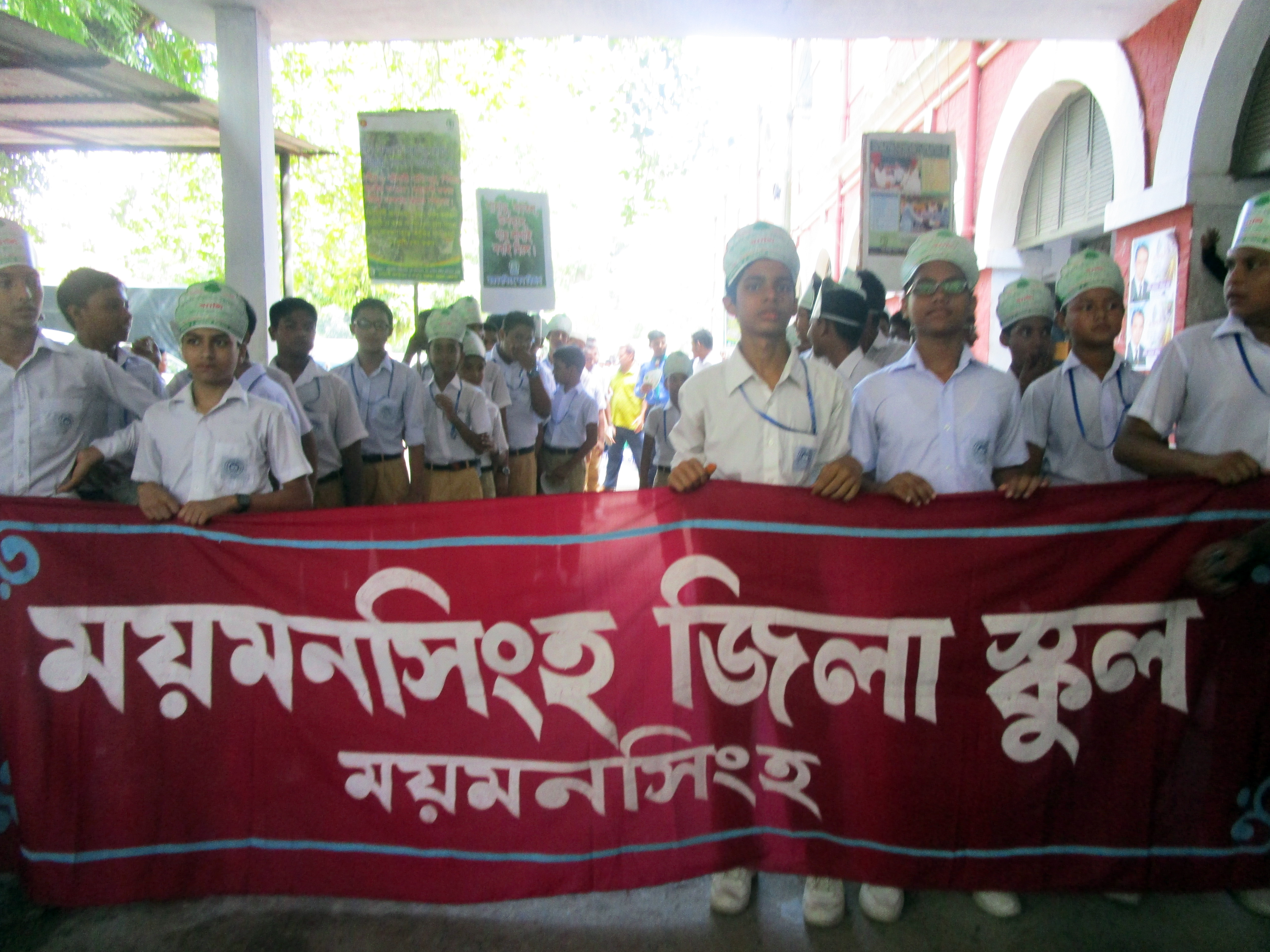
MZS Students

== History ==
Mymensingh Zilla School was established in 1846 as an English-medium institution named Hardinge School, under the supervision of Mr. F. B. Camp, the then Deputy Collector of the East India Company. On 3 November 1853, it was re-established as a full-fledged English-medium school near Kachari (present-day Laboratory School). The school no longer operates as an English-medium institution; it now follows the national curriculum of Bangladesh, with Bengali as the medium of instruction. Bhagawan Chandra Bose, father of the renowned scientist Jagadish Chandra Bose, served as the first headmaster of the school.

During the tenure of S.M.A. Kajmi, the first Deputy Commissioner of Mymensingh, the government designated the institution as a multilateral pilot school. The main school buildings, which are still in use today, were constructed in 1912. In 1965, the school premises were redesigned and restructured by an American science teacher, Mr. Dril.

The school compound was used as a base for the British Army during World War II. It also served as a training camp for freedom fighters during the Bangladesh Liberation War in 1971. More than 40 students of the school sacrificed their lives during the war, fighting against the Pakistan Army.

On 3 March 1981, police fired tear gas to disperse rioting students of Mymensingh Zilla School. Sixty people were injured in the clash, which erupted when students attempted to reoccupy part of their hostel building that had recently been allocated by the government to an adjacent primary training institute.

== Admission ==
Admission to Mymensingh Zilla School typically takes place at the 3rd and 6th grade levels. Prospective students for entry into Class 3 and Class 6 generally apply by December to sit for the admission test. Only those who qualify in the test are granted admission.

== Academics ==
Mymensingh Zilla School offers education from Class 3 to Class 10. After successfully completing Class 8, students are required to choose between the Science and Business Studies streams. Admission into the Science stream depends on the marks obtained in Mathematics and General Science in the Junior School Certificate (JSC) examination.

From Class 9 onwards, students are divided into two academic streams: Science and Business Studies. Upon successful completion of Class 10, students are eligible to appear for the Secondary School Certificate (SSC) examination.

== Co-curricular activities ==
=== Sports ===
Students of Mymensingh Zilla School regularly participate in various sporting events and competitions at local, regional, and national levels. To support this, the school provides training and coaching in advance. Popular outdoor sports include football, handball, basketball, volleyball, cricket, and hockey. In addition, the school offers facilities for indoor games such as chess, table tennis, and carrom.

Cricketer Mahmudullah with his teammates in MZS Cricket Team

The school reached the finals of the 12th Nirman School Cricket Tournament in 1994, where it faced Narayanganj High School. Mymensingh Zilla School lost the match by five wickets.

=== Debate and public speaking ===
Mymensingh Zilla School has an active debate team that regularly participates in regional and national debate competitions, achieving notable success. The team has also appeared in several national television debate programmes. Recently, the school won the Prothom Alo–Pushti Bitorko Protijogita. In addition, individual students have won national public speaking contests and the Creative Talent Hunt Competition.

=== Music ===
Mymensingh Zilla School has a musical group that primarily performs Bengali folk music and modern Bengali songs, including Rabindra Sangeet and Nazrul Geeti, on various occasions. The group typically uses instruments such as the harmonium, tabla, and guitar during performances. As part of the daily school assembly held before classes, the group leads the singing of the national anthem.

=== Olympiads ===
Mymensingh Zilla School is recognised as one of the most successful institutions in both national and international Olympiads. Several students from the school have received medals and honours in various competitions, including the International Mathematical Olympiad, International Physics Olympiad, International Junior Science Olympiad, Asia Pacific Mathematical Olympiad, Asian Physics Olympiad, Iranian Geometry Olympiad, Bangladesh Mathematical Olympiad, Bangladesh Physics Olympiad, Bangladesh Olympiad in Informatics, National High School Programming Contest (NHSPC), Bangladesh Chemistry Olympiad, among others.

=== Bangladesh National Cadet Corps (BNCC) and Bangladesh Scouts ===
Mymensingh Zilla School has an active BNCC unit open to all interested students. The school also hosts scouting activities, with scouts trained under the supervision of Bangladesh Scouts. Both the BNCC and the School Scouts unit participate in organising various school programmes and are involved in social service activities.

== School magazine ==
Mymensingh Zilla School publishes an annual magazine titled Oitijjho (Bengali: ঐতিহ্য). The magazine features poetry, short stories, comic pieces, and artworks created by the students.

== Notable alumni ==
- Abu Sayeed Chowdhury, the 2nd President of Bangladesh.
- Anandamohan Bose, Indian political leader and social reformer, and president of the Indian National Congress.
- Jagadish Chandra Bose, polymath: physicist, biologist, botanist, archaeologist, and science fiction writer.
- Nurul Amin, the 8th Prime Minister of Pakistan.
- Syed Ishtiaq Ahmed, Attorney General of Bangladesh.
- Jyotirmoy Guhathakurta, educator and humanist, martyred during the 1971 Dhaka University massacre.
- M. Anwar Hossain, educator, scientist, and former vice-chancellor of Jahangirnagar University.
- Syed Nazrul Islam, acting President of Bangladesh during the Liberation War.
- Abdul Monem Khan, governor of East Pakistan from 1962 to 1969.
- Jamilur Reza Choudhury, National Professor of Bangladesh.
- Md. Hafizur Rahman, minister of food and agriculture of Pakistan (1958–1960); minister of commerce of Pakistan (1960–1962); provincial minister of finance and planning of East Pakistan (1962–1965).
- Krishna Kumar Mitra, Indian independence activist and journalist.
- M. R. Akhtar Mukul, author and presenter of Chorompotro during the Bangladesh Liberation War.
- Abu Zafar Obaidullah, poet.
- Upendrakishore Ray Chowdhury, musician, artist, writer, and printing pioneer.
- Mahmudullah, cricketer.
- Ehsan Khan, architect.
- Mohammad Abdur Rouf, Justice and former Chief Election Commissioner of Bangladesh
- Abul Kashem Fazlul Haq, writer, essayist, translator, critic, and columnist.
- Baharul Alam, 31st inspector general of Bangladesh Police.
- Anjir Liton, poet.

== Notable headmasters ==
- Girish Chandra Sen, a Brahmo Samaj missionary and the first person to translate the Quran into the Bengali language.
- Bhagawan Chandra Bose, father of Sir Jagadish Chandra Bose, and the first headmaster of Mymensingh Zilla School.

== See also ==
- Vidyamoyee Govt. Girls' High School
- Government Laboratory High School, Mymensingh
