= Abdur Rashid Khan =

Abdur Rashid Khan may refer to:

- Abdur Rashid Khan (politician), Pakistani politician
- Abdur Rashid Khan (poet)
- Abdul Rashid Khan, Indian vocalist
- Md. Abdur Rashid Khan, Bangladeshi politician
