= Ibrahim Khalil (playwright) =

Bangladeshi writer, playwright, and educationist

- ইব্রাহীম খলিল

Personal details
- Born: 1 January 1916 Bangla bazar, Old Dhaka, British Raj
- Died: 19 September 1974 (aged 58) Dhaka
- Awards: Bangla Academy Literary Award

Ibrahim Khalil (1 January 1916 – 19 September 1974) was a Bangladeshi writer, playwright and eminent educationist. He received the Bangla Academy Literary Award in 1970 for his play.

== Career ==
Ibrahim Khalil was born on 1 January 1916. He lived in Bangla bazar of old Dhaka. He was the headmaster of Muslim High School. After retirement, he was the headmaster of Dhaka Pagoz High School. He was involved in literary work for a long time. His novels, plays, stories and travelogues were well received by Sudhijan. He was also involved with Dhaka Betar Kendra. His first play Samadhi was published in 1949. He wanted to establish Islamic ideology in his plays. Such a dream has tempted him to compose plays.

== Awards and honors ==
- Bangla Academy Literary Award (1970)

== Bibliography ==
- সমাধি (1957)
- স্পেন বিজয়ী মুসা (1949)
- ফিরিঙ্গী হার্মাদ (1953)
- ফিরিঙ্গীরাজ (1954)
- কিসসা নয়, কাহিনী (1956)
- নূরজাহান (1970)
- শের শাহ্‌
- সীমান্তের চিঠি
- বাংলা ব্যাকরণ

== Death ==
Ibrahim Khalil died on 19 September 1974.

== See also ==
- List of Bangla Academy Literary Award recipients (1970–1979)
