= Nasirabad College, Mymensingh =

Oldest private college in Mymensingh, Bangladesh

- নাসিরাবাদ কলেজ, ময়মনসিংহ
- Type: Private College
- Established: 1 July 1948; 78 years ago
- Founder: Riaz Uddin Ahmad
- Academic affiliations: Graduation and post-graduation: National University, Bangladesh; Higher Secondary: Mymensingh Education Board
- Principal: Ahmed Shafiq
- Students: about 10,000
- Location: Nasirabad College Road, Mymensingh, Bangladesh; 24.7532°N 90.3934°E
- Campus: Urban, 9.62 acres
- Website: ncmym.edu.bd

Nasirabad College, Mymensingh (Bengali: নাসিরাবাদ কলেজ, ময়মনসিংহ) is a traditional higher education institution of Mymensingh Division. It is one of the oldest private colleges in the country and as well as in Mymensingh. The college was established on 1 July 1948, and is located in Mymensingh Sadar.

== Notable people ==
=== Faculty ===
- Motiur Rahman
- Jatin Sarker
- Golam Samdani Koraishi
- Rahat Khan

=== Former student ===
- Muhammad Kamaruzzaman
- Musharraf Karim
- Golam Samdani Koraishi

== See also ==
- Ananda Mohan College
- Muminunnisa Government Mohila College
- Gurudayal Government College
