= Jatin =

Name list

Jatin is a given name of Indian origin, meaning "The Auspicious One".

Notable people with the name include:

- Jatin Bora (born 1970), Indian actor who has appeared in Assamese language movies
- Jatin Das (1879–1915), Bengali Indian revolutionary philosopher against British rule
- Jatin Kanakia (1952–1999), Indian actor
- Jatin Pandit, Bollywood film composer
- Jatin Paranjpe (born 1972), Indian cricketer
- Jatin Sarker (1936–2025), Bengali intellect, researcher and biographer of Bangladesh
- Jatin Singh nunnu boy (2002)

== See also ==
- Bagha Jatin
