= Atowar Rahman =

Bangladeshi writer and researcher

- আতোয়ার রহমান

Personal details
- Born: 15 March 1927 Bahirchar, Ramkrishnapur, British Raj
- Died: 12 February 2002 (aged 74) Dhaka
- Awards: Bangla Academy Literary Award

Atowar Rahman (15 March 1927 – 12 February 2002) was a Bangladeshi writer, researcher and multilingualist. He received the Bangla Academy Literary Award in 1970 for his special contribution to children's literature.

== Career ==
Atowar Rahman was born on 15 March 1927 in the village of Ramkrishnapur Bahirchar in Kushtia.

== Awards and honors ==
- Bangla Academy Literary Award (1970)

== Bibliography ==
- একাত্তর: নির্যাতনের কড়চা
- আমি মুক্তিযোদ্ধা ছিলাম
- শিশু শিক্ষা ও শিশুতোষ প্রবন্ধ সংগ্রহ
- বলয়
- হলদেপাতা
- মনীষীদের জীবন থেকে
- পাখির বাসা খাসা
- শিশুসাহিত্যের কতিপয় রথী
- ১৯৬২, ২০১৬: মহাবিপ্লবের বীর সিপাহী
- ১৯৯২, ২০০৪: সূর্যবাদ
- ঘাসের বনে ছোট্ট কুটির (Original: Laura Ingles Wilder)
- ক্যানটারবেরি উপাখ্যান

== Death ==
Atowar Rahman died on 12 February 2002.

== See also ==
- List of Bangla Academy Literary Award recipients (1970–1979)
