= Mannan Hira =

Bangladeshi dramatist and filmmaker (1956–2020)

- মান্নান হীরা
- Born: 1956; Sirajganj, East Pakistan, Pakistan
- Died: 23 December 2020 (aged 63–64)
- Education: Rajshahi College; University of Dhaka
- Occupations: Playwright, film director
- Organization(s): Aranyak Natyadal, Potho Natok Parishad
- Awards: Bangla Academy Literary Award

Mannan Hira (1956 – 23 December 2020) was a Bangladeshi dramatist and filmmaker. He was the recipient of 2006 Bangla Academy Literary Award in the drama category.

== Career ==
Hira was a member of Aranyak Natyadal and involved in street theatre movement. He was the president of Bangladesh Path Natok Parishad. He had written around 15 theater plays including Laal Jamin, Bhager Manush, Moyur Singhasan and Sada-Kalo. Murkha Loker Murkha Kotha is one of his street plays. In 2014, Hira debuted as a filmmaker through Ekatturer Khudiram, a children's film set during the Bangladesh Liberation War.

== Works ==
- Laal Jamin
- Bhager Manush
- Moyur Singhasan and Sada-Kalo
- Murkha Loker Murkha Kotha
- Ekatturer Khudiram
