= Liton =

Liton (Bengali: লিটন) is a Bengali masculine given name and may refer to:

== People ==
- Nur Khan Liton, Bangladeshi lawyer and human rights activist
- Abdur Rahaman Liton (1958-2021), West Bengali politician
- Abul Hasnat Muhammad Khairuzzaman Liton (born 1959), former mayor of Rajshahi
- Mahmudul Haque Liton (born 1963), Bangladesh men's international footballer
- Noor-E-Alam Chowdhury Liton (born 1964), former chief whip of the Parliament of Bangladesh
- Anjir Liton (born 1965), former director general of Bangladesh Children's Academy
- Manjurul Islam Liton (1968-2016), Bangladesh Awami League politician
- Rezaul Karim Liton (born 1980), Bangladesh men's international footballer
- Russel Mahmud Liton (born 1994), Bangladesh men's international footballer and goalkeeper
- Shahadat Hossain Liton, Bangladeshi film director

== See also ==
- Dulu
