= Sufia Khatun =

Sufia Khatun may refer to:

- Sufia Khatun (writer) (1922–2023), Bangladeshi author and social activist
- Kangalini Sufia (born 1961), or Sufia Khatun, Bangladeshi folk singer
