= Kalmakanda Government Pilot High School =

- কলমাকান্দা সরকারি পাইলট উচ্চ বিদ্যালয়
- New Building

Location
- Zilla Parishad Super Market, Kalmakanda-Durgapur Road; Kalmakanda; Netrakona, Mymensingh, 2430; Bangladesh; 25.07754°N 90.88817°E

Information
- School type: Govt secondary
- Religious affiliation: Impartial
- Established: 1942
- School board: Board of Intermediate and Secondary Education, Mymensingh
- Session: January–December
- School code: EIIN- 112992
- Faculty: Science, Business studies, Humanities and Technical (Vocational)
- Teaching staff: 23
- Grades: 6th—10th
- Gender: Co-educational
- Education system: National Curriculum and Textbook Board
- Colours: White, Navy Blue

Kalmakanda Government Pilot High School is a secondary school located in Kalmakanda Upazila, within the Netrakona District.

== History ==
Kalmakanda Government Pilot High School was established in 1942 under the British rule before Bangladesh became independent.

== Extra curricular activities ==
=== Institutional activities ===
- Science Fair and Science Lab

A science fair is organized every year with the intention to create a science-conscious society and country and allows students to identify their own merit by participating spontaneously.

- Computer Lab

The institute has a computer laboratory to ensure that students are well-versed and to ensure the versatile use of computers. According to the schedule, the class-based students are taught about the use of computer and information technology in their hands.

- Study Tour

In order to alleviate the fatigue of the classroom, to keep the mind afloat, to know the unknown, to visit the historical and sightseeing of the country with its own initiative, educational tours are organized with the help of leading and leading teachers.

- Library

There are about 4,000 various types of books of essays, novels, short stories, history, geography, mythology, economics, research or discovery, and science.

=== Developing the Reading Habit Program ===
- Debating Club

Debating Club needs a number of students to debate and to know hot to and respect the views of others. In addition, a debating club has been set up to know various issues through debate logic and to put into practice the logic of opposition.

- Cultural Club

Cultural Club is for the students' emotional calm and development of their dormant talent. Students can become members of the cultural club for a cultural ambiance including dance, song, poetry recitation. Also, the use of various musical instruments, dances, and songs is taught free of cost.

- Sports Club

The need for a sports club to overcome the monotony of study is immense. Students can develop their talents by participating in various sports including football, cricket, badminton, volleyball, and becoming members of the club. An annual sports competition is also organized to encourage the students.

- Science Club

The main aim of the club is to encourage and inspire students to create science-oriented and innovative new creations. The science fair showcases students' discoveries. In this, the students become more and more focused on the new creation.
