= Dhruba Esh =

Bangladeshi cover artist and writer

- ধ্রুব এষ
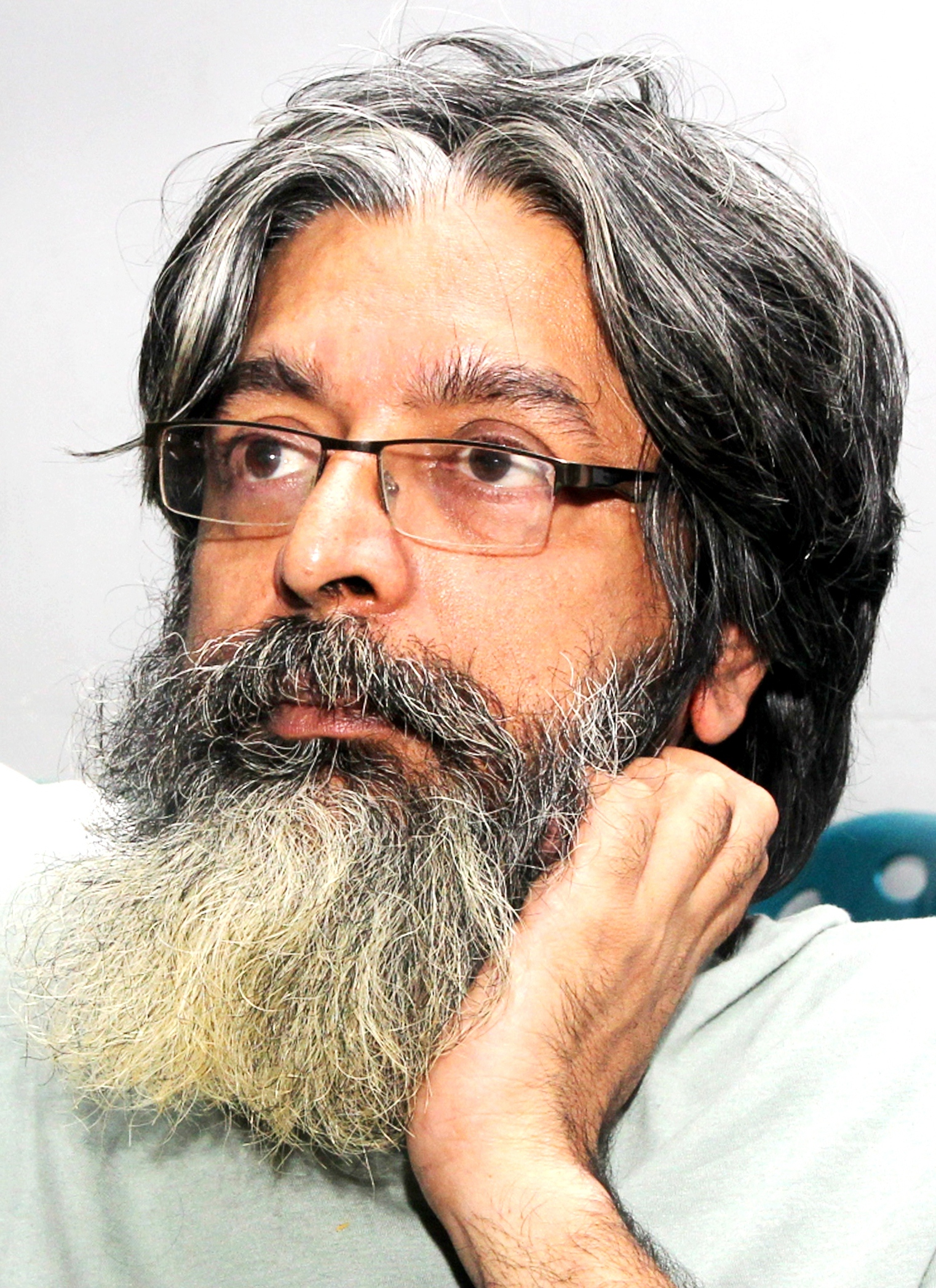
- Esh in 2017
- Born: 17 January 1967 (age 59); Sunamganj, East Pakistan, Pakistan
- Education: University of Dhaka
- Occupation: Cover artist‚ writer
- Awards: Bangla Academy Literary Award

Dhruba Esh (born 17 January 1967) is a Bangladeshi cover artist and writer. He has designed a number of the most notable covers including Humayun Ahmed's Himu and Misir Ali series. He won 2022 Bangla Academy Literary Award for his contribution to children's literature.

== Early life ==
Esh was born on 17 January 1967 at Sunamganj District of the then East Pakistan (now Bangladesh) to Bhupati Ranjan Esh and Leela Esh. He graduated from University of Dhaka in fine arts.

== Career ==
Esh started his career as a cover artist in 1989 when he was a second-year student of the University of Dhaka. Initially, he used to cover the book of Imdadul Haque Milan. He was later introduced to Humayun Ahmed by other publishers and started designing book covers for him in 1990s. In an interview with The Daily Star in February 2019, he said that he has designed close to 25,000 book covers in his career.

Esh wrote children's scientific books including "Ang Bang Chang" and "Ami Ekta Bhoot". He also wrote biographies including "Shreshtha Humayun Ahmed" and "Tumi Kemon Acho Humayun Ahmed".

== Awards ==
- Panjeree Chotokaku Ananda Alo Shishu Shahitya Award (2019)
- Bangla Academy Literature Award for Children's Literature (2022)
