= Sumankumar Dash =

Bangladeshi writer and journalist (born 1982)

- সুমনকুমার দাশ
- Born: July 12, 1982 (age 44); Sunamganj District, Bangladesh
- Citizenship: Bangladesh
- Occupations: Journalist, writer
- Employer: Prothom Alo
- Awards: Bangla Academy Literary Award (2023)

Sumankumar Dash (Bengali: সুমনকুমার দাশ) is a Bangladeshi journalist and essayist of folklore. He won the 2023 Bangla Academy Literary Award for folklore. He is the Sylhet correspondent of Prothom Alo.

== Early life ==
Dash was born on 12 September 1982 at Sallah Upazila in Sunamganj District of Bangladesh.

== Work ==
He is known for his work as the staff correspondent in Sylhet for the Bangladeshi newspaper Prothom Alo. In 2022, he was honored by the newspaper as one of its “best correspondents.”

== Awards ==
- Bangla Academy Literary Award (2023)
