= Arunabh Sarkar =

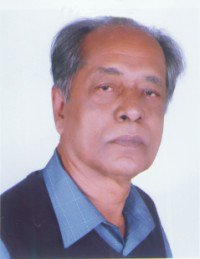
- Born: 29 May 1941 (age 84); Tangail District, Bengal Presidency, British India
- Occupations: Writer, poet, journalist

Arunabh Sarkar (Bengali: অরুণাভ সরকার; born 29 May 1941) is a Bangladeshi poet, columnist, literary editor, and freedom fighter. He was born in Tangail, Bangladesh. He received the 2009 Bangla Academy Literary Award for poetry. Arunabh also received the Tangail Sahitya Sangsad Poetry Award for 2007. He has published three collections of poems : Nagare Baul, Keu Kichhui Jane Na, and Narira Fere Na. Sarkar also edited the poetry magazine Eshika from 1969 to 1985 and has been a journalist for some 40 years. He died on 18 December 2014.
