= Musharraf Karim =

Bangladeshi writer (1946–2020)

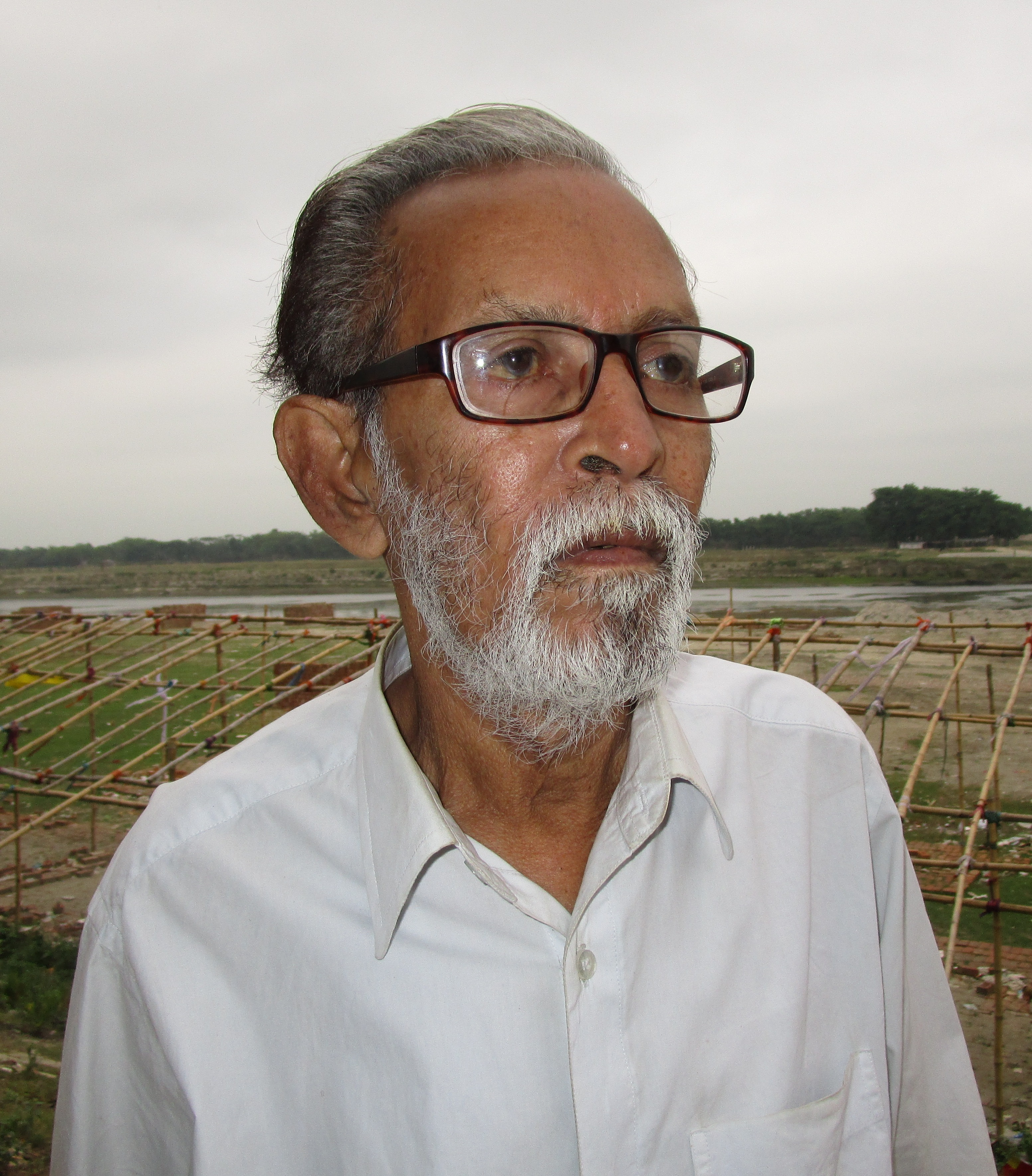
- Karim in 2015
- Born: 9 January 1946
- Died: 11 January 2020 (aged 74)
- Awards: Bangla Academy Literary Award (2003)

Musharraf Karim (9 January 1946 – 11 January 2020) was a Bangladeshi writer and journalist. He was conferred with the Bangla Academy Literary Award in 2003 for his contribution to juvenile literature. He was a fellow of the Bangla Academy.

== Early life ==
Karim was born on 9 January 1946 in Mymensingh to M. A. Karim and Amina Khatun. His ancestors' house was situated at Khairati under Ishwarganj in Mymensingh. He passed matriculation from Edward Institution, Mymensingh in 1964. Later, he was admitted into Nasirabad College, Mymensingh. He completed higher secondary studies from there in 1967. He also graduated from there in 1972. Later, he was admitted into Ananda Mohan College. He completed his post graduate studies in Bangla from there in 1974. He took part in the movements against Ayub Khan in the sixties.

== Career ==
Khan was the news editor of the Daily Dinkal. He was a permanent member of the Jatiya Press Club. He also served as the director of Tribal Cultural Academy.

Khan was involved in writing books too. He was also conferred with Bangla Academy Literary Award in 2003 for his contribution in juvenile literature. He was a fellow of Bangla Academy.

== Death ==
Khan died on 11 January 2020 at a private hospital in Mymensingh at the age of 74.

== Selected bibliography ==
=== Poetry ===
- Pathorer Pothe
- Onyo Ek Adibase
- Se Noy Sundori Shirin
- Kothay Se Dirgho Debdaru
- Nibedoner Gondhodhala
- Ontorer Byakul Byadhi
- Ke Achhe, Keu Ki Achhe
- Nirbachito Kobita
- Ghaser Dogay Holud Foring

=== Novel ===
- Purbopurushgon
- Prothom Brishti
- Swapnokabyo
- Uponyastroyi

=== Juvenile literature ===
- Kokakaka
- Lebendish
- Chhokka Mamar Galgolpo
- Bogus Bhoot
- Gu For Natin
- Neelganjer Bhoot
- Tom Sahebrr Odvut Bari
- Nijhumpurer Porobari
- Choraguhar Rohosyo
- Voyongkor Chheledhora
- Kishor Uponyas Somogro
