= Bashir Al Helal =

Bangladeshi novelist (1936–2021)

- বশীর আল-হেলাল
- Born: January 6, 1936; Talibpur, Murshidabad District, British Raj (Present day in West Bengal, India)
- Died: August 31, 2021 (aged 85); Dhaka, Bangladesh
- Occupation: Novelist
- Awards: Bangla Academy Literary Award

Bashir Al Helal (6 January 1936 – 31 August 2021) was a Bangladeshi novelist. In 1969 he was appointed as the co-principal of the Bangla Academy. He then became the Vice-Chancellor of the Bangla Academy. Most recently, he served as the director of the Bangla Academy. He retired in 1993. He has been working in Bangla Academy for about 24 years. In order to establish well. He wrote about Enamul Haque's contribution in the book 'History of Bangla Academy'.

== Education and life ==
Bashir Al-Helal was born on 6 January 1936 in Mir Para village of Talibpur in Murshidabad district. After being handcuffed by his father, he was admitted to Talibpur Pathshala. Then he was admitted in the primary section of HE High School in Talibpur village. There he studied until 6th class. Admitted to Rajshahi Collegiate School in 7th class. After studying in Rajshahi for one year, he was admitted in 9th class in Setabganj High School and matriculated from there.

He passed IA from Calcutta Government College in 1954. He then got admission in AC College, Jalpaiguri with Honors in Bengal. After passing Honors from this college in 1957, he moved to Calcutta. There he was admitted to Calcutta University for his MA in Bengali. In 1956 he passed MA in Bengal from Calcutta University.

== Works ==
=== Novels ===
- Kalo Ilish (The Black Hilsha, 1979)
- Ghritakumari (The Aloe, 1984)
- Shesh Panpatra (The Last Drinking Vessel, 1986)
- Nurjahander Madhumas (Spring of the Nurjahans, 1988)
- Shishirer Deshe Avijan (An Expedition in the Land of Dew, 1990)

=== History books ===
- Bhasha Andoloner Itihas (The History of Bengali Language Movement, 1985)
- History of Bangla Academy (Bangla Academy't Itihas)

== Awards ==
- Alaol Literary Award (1991)
- Bangla Academy Literary Award (1993)
