= Khaleda Adib Chowdhury =

- খালেদা আদিব চৌধুরী
- Born: c. 1937; Comilla, Bengal Province, British India
- Died: 28 May 2008 (aged 70–71); Dhaka, Bangladesh
- Occupations: Writer, editor
- Children: Sumona Haque
- Awards: Full list

Khaleda Adib Chowdhury (c. 1937 – 28 May 2008) was a Bangladeshi writer. She was the recipient of 1993 Bangla Academy Literary Award.

== Background and career ==
Chowdhury was born in 1937 in Comilla in the then British India. She served as a government officer, teacher, journalist and later, a writer. She published over 42 books. She was the editor of juvenile magazine Nabarun and Sachitra Bangladesh.

== Personal life ==
Chowdhury was married to Anwarul Haque, a semi-governmental service holder. Together they had one son, Tanveerul Haque Probal, and two daughters, Sangeeta Khan and Sumona Haque. Tanveerul, a civil engineer, was the president of REHAB. Sangeeta (d. 2023) was an entrepreneur and women's rights activist. She was married to Faizur Rahman Khan, a former managing director of Building Technology & Ideas Limited (bti). Sumona is a singer and painter, known for voicing television advertisement jingles.

Chowdhury died on 28 May 2008 in Uttara neighborhood, Dhaka.

== Works ==
- Amar Deho Amar Haat (1978)
- Pantho Tomar Bhalobasha (1983)
- Tomar Onongo (1986)
- Duhaate Andhar Kete (1993)
- Hae Badhon Lotar Kadon (1995)
- Premer Kobita (1998)
- Nirob Narsisus Obhimaan Aache Bedonae, Poems (2001)

== Awards ==
- Bangla Academy Literary Award (1993)
- Alaol Literature Award
- Poet Jashim Uddin Parsiahd Literature Award
- Bangladesh Lekhika Shongho Award
- Agrani Bank Shishu Shahitto Award
- M Nurul Kader Foundation Shahitto Award
- Dhaka Mahila Club Podok
- Ushi Shahitto Award (Comilla)
