= Bipradash Barua =

Bangladeshi novelist (born 1940)

- বিপ্রদাশ বড়ুয়া
- Born: 20 August 1940 (age 85); Ichamoti, Rangunia Upazila, Chittagong
- Education: Chattogram College, University of Dhaka
- Occupation: Novelist
- Awards: Ekushey Award (2014); Bangla Academy Literary Award (1991)

Bipradash Barua (born September 20, 1940) is a Bangladeshi novelist. He was awarded Bangla Academy Literary Award in 1991 and Ekushey Padak in 2014.

== Works ==
Novels

- Achena (The Unknown, 1975)
- Bhoy, Bhalobasa Nirbasan (Fear, Love, Exile, 1988)
- Samudracar O Bidrohira (The Sea-spies and the Insurgents, 1990)
- Muktijoddhara (Freedom-Fighters, 1991)
- Bhitare Ekjan Kande (Someone Weeps Within, 1996)
- Shraman Gautam (1996)
- Ami Tomar Kache Samudrer Ekti Dheu Jama Rekhechi (I Kept with You a Wave of the Sea, 1997)
- Sraman Goutam

== Awards ==
- Kathashilpi Literary Award (1982)
- International Youth Anniversary Medal (1985)
- Agrani Bank Award for Juvenile Literature (1395 and 1398 BS)
- Bangla Academy Literary Award (1991)
- Atish Dipangkar Gold Medal (1997)
- Ekushey Padak (2014)
