= Sikdar Aminul Haq =

Bangladeshi poet (1942–2003)

Sikder Aminul Haq
- Born: 6 December 1942; Kanchrapara, Calcutta, British India
- Died: May 17, 2003 (aged 60); Dhaka, Bangladesh
- Occupation: Poet

Sikdar Aminul Haq (Bengali: সিকদার আমিনুল হক; 6 December 1942 – 17 May 2003) was a Bangladeshi poet. In recognition of his contribution in language and literature, the government of Bangladesh posthumously awarded him the country's second highest civilian award Ekushey Padak in 2020.

== Career ==
Haq is a recipient of the Bangla Academy Literary Award, 1994 for poetry. His breakthrough came with his work Satata Danar Manush.

Sikdar is popular for the usage of whimsical and innovative imagery in his poems.

== Works ==
Some of his notable works:

- Duurer Karnish (1975)
- Teen Papreer Phul (1979)
- Parabat Ei Pracheerer Shesh Kabita (1982)
- Ami Sei Electra (1985)
- Bohudin Upekhae Bohudin Andhokare (1982)
- Patrey Tumi Protidin Jol (1987)
- Ek Ratri Ek Writu (1991)
- Satata Danar Manush (1991)
- Suprobhat He Baranda (1993)
- Kafkar Jama (1994)
- Sulata Amar Elsa (1994)
- Rumaler Alo O Onnanno Kabita (1995)
- Lorkake Jedin Ora Niye Gelo (1997)
- Bimorsho Tatar (2002)
- Ishitar Ondhokar Shue Ache (2002)
