= Faruk Mahmud =

Bangladeshi poet and journalist

- Occupations: Poet and journalist
- Writing career
- Subject: Poetry
- Notable awards: Bangla Academy Literary Award 2022

Faruk Mahmud is a Bangladeshi poet and journalist, he won Bangla Academy Literary Award in 2022.

== Life ==
He post graduated from Dhaka University.

He was born on 17 July 1952 in Kishoreganj, Bangladesh.

== Awards ==
- Sukumar Roy Sahitya Padak 2009
- Sonar Bangla Sahitya Award 2020
- Bangla Academy literary Award 2022
