= G H Habib =

Bangladeshi writer, translator and academic

- জি এইচ হাবীব
- Born: Golam Hossain Habib; 1967 (age 58–59); Dhaka, Bangladesh
- Education: Jahangirnagar University
- Occupations: Writer, translator, academic
- Awards: Bangla Academy Literary Award (2024)

G H Habib (born 1967), full name Golam Hossain Habib, is a Bangladeshi writer, translator and academic. He has translated works of international literature into Bengali, including Gabriel García Márquez's One Hundred Years of Solitude, Umberto Eco's The Name of the Rose, Jostein Gaarder's Sophie's World, and Isaac Asimov's Foundation. He received the Bangla Academy Literary Award in 2024 for translation.

== Early life and education ==
Habib was born in 1967 in Dhaka, Bangladesh. He studied at Shaheed Abu Taleb High School and later attended Mirzapur Cadet College, from where he completed his secondary and higher secondary education. He studied English at Jahangirnagar University, where he completed his bachelor's and master's degrees.

== Career ==
Habib began his career in journalism. He later became a teacher in the Department of English at the University of Chittagong.

He has worked as a literary translator alongside his academic career. His work has included translations of fiction, literary criticism and works dealing with language and knowledge.

== Writing career ==
Habib became interested in translation after reading books published by Seba Prokashoni, Raduga and Pragati Prokashoni. His first translated work, titled Jege Tai To Bhabi, was published in the February 1987 issue of Seba Prokashoni's magazine Rahasya.

His first book-length translation was Arthur Conan Doyle's The Sign of the Four, published by Seba Prokashoni in 1988.

Habib has translated works by writers including Gabriel García Márquez, Umberto Eco, Jostein Gaarder, Isaac Asimov, Roland Barthes, Italo Calvino and Amos Tutuola.

Among his translations are One Hundred Years of Solitude, The Name of the Rose, Sophie's World, Foundation, The Death of the Author, Invisible Cities, The Palm-Wine Drinkard, and Latin Vasar Kotha (The Story of the Latin Language).

His Bengali translation of One Hundred Years of Solitude was first published at the 2000 Ekushey Book Fair, followed by a revised edition in 2001. A review published by Roar Media also identifies Habib as the Bengali translator of Márquez's novel.

In a 2025 interview with The Daily Star, Habib said that translating One Hundred Years of Solitude took about five years. He worked from Gregory Rabassa's English translation because he did not know Spanish, the language of Márquez's original novel.

In a 2025 interview with Prothom Alo, Habib discussed his approach to translation and the role of translation in introducing international literature, literary theory and other fields of knowledge to Bengali readers.

== Awards ==
Habib was awarded the Bangla Academy Literary Award in the translation category in 2024. His name appeared in the initial list announced on 23 January 2025, which was later suspended and reviewed. A revised list published on 30 January retained Habib as the recipient in the translation category.
