= Imtiar Shamim =

Novelist and writer from Bangladesh

- Born: 1965 (age 60–61)
- Education: University of Rajshahi
- Parents: Chowdhury Osman (father); Hamida Sultana (mother)
- Relatives: Zulfikar Matin (brother); Ikhtiar Chowdhury (brother)

Imtiar Shamim (born 1965) is a Bangladeshi novelist and writer. He was awarded the Bangla Academy Literary Award for fiction in 2021. As of 2024, he has published a total 44 books.

== Background and career ==
Shamim was born in 1965 to Chowdhury Osman, a poet and an educationist, and Hamida Sultana. Shamim studied sociology at the University of Rajshahi. He has worked as a journalist and editor at several newspapers in Bangladesh. As a writer, he is best known for his novels and short stories.

== Works ==
- Danakata Himer Bhitor
