= List of Intermediate and Secondary Education Boards in Bangladesh =

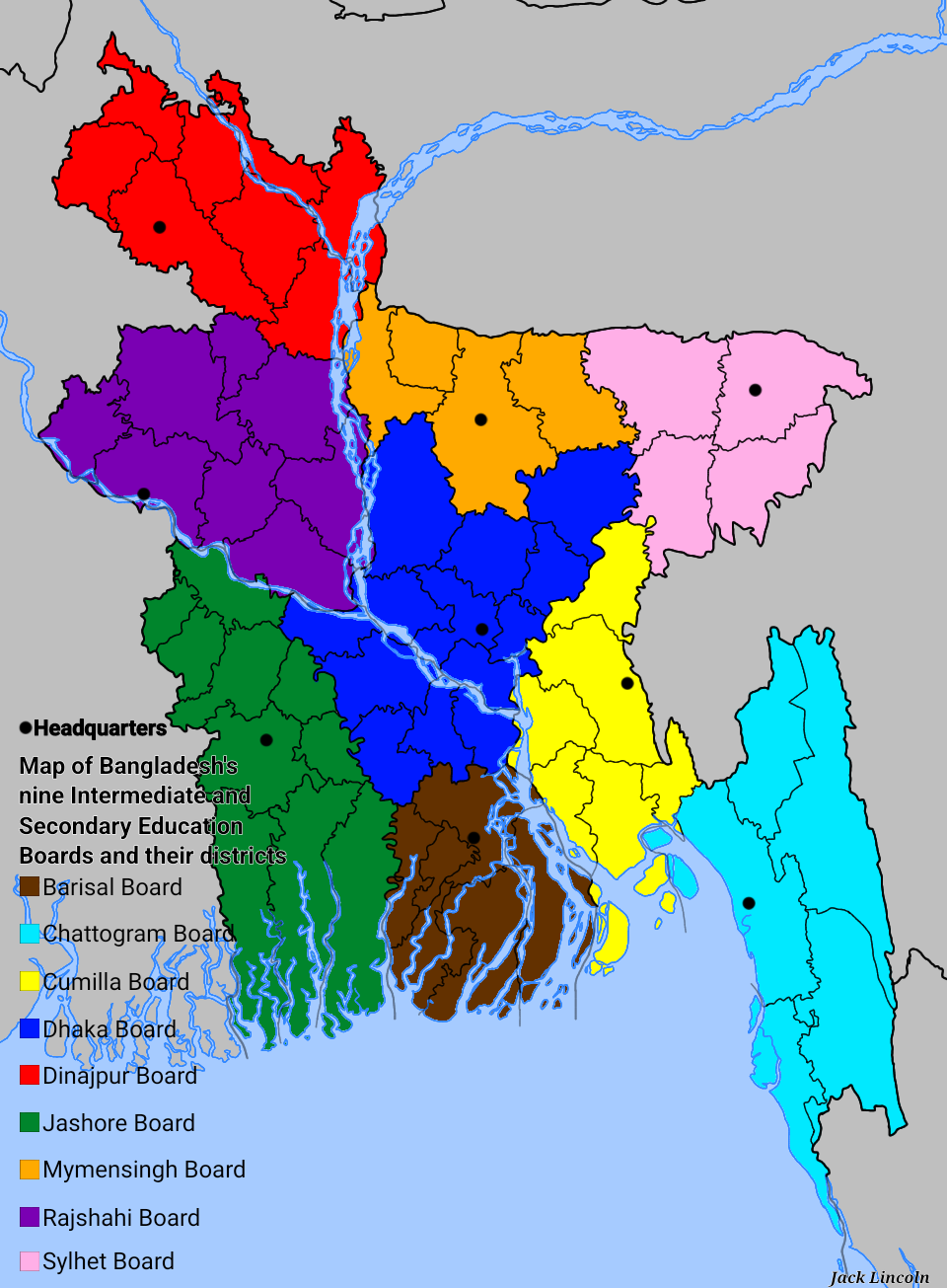
Map of Bangladesh's nine Intermediate and Secondary Education Boards and their districts

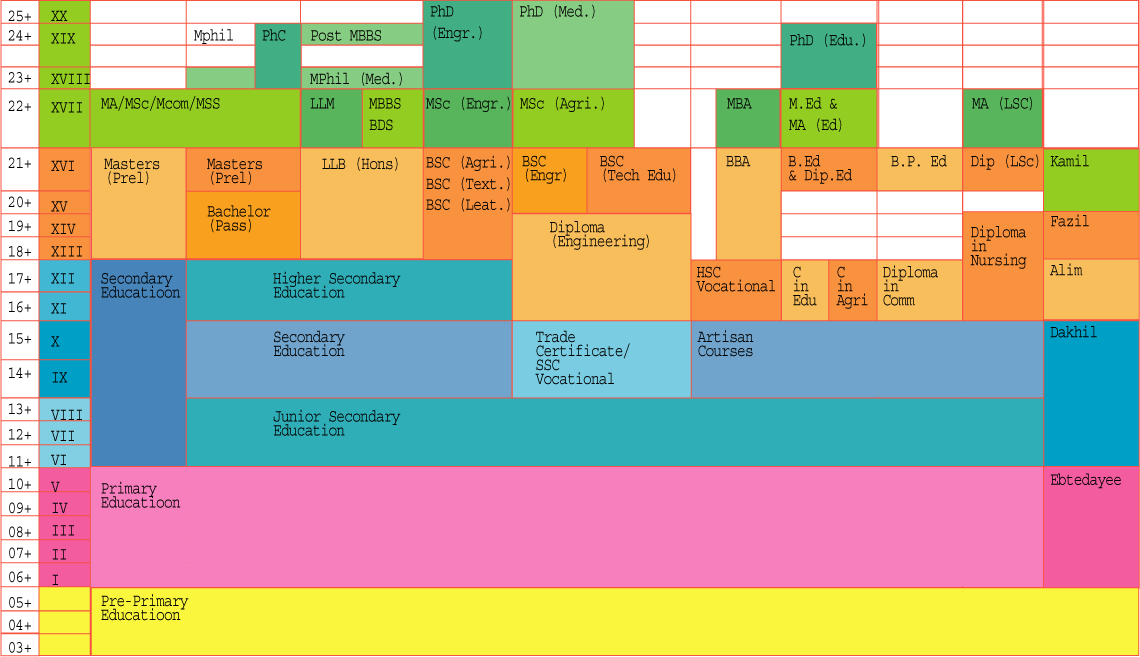
Education system in Bangladesh

The district-based Boards of Intermediate and Secondary Education in Bangladesh manage the country's three-tiered education system at the primary, secondary and higher secondary level. They are responsible for conducting the examinations for the Secondary School Certificate (S.S.C) and Higher Secondary (School) Certificate (H.S.C) level public examinations. S.S.C examination refers to 10th grade exams and H.S.C refers to 12th grade exams. The boards are also responsible for the recognition of private sector educational institutes.

1. Board of Intermediate and Secondary Education, Barisal
2. Board of Intermediate and Secondary Education, Chattogram
3. Board of Intermediate and Secondary Education, Cumilla
4. Board of Intermediate and Secondary Education, Dhaka
5. Board of Intermediate and Secondary Education, Dinajpur
6. Board of Intermediate and Secondary Education, Jashore
7. Board of Intermediate and Secondary Education, Mymensingh
8. Board of Intermediate and Secondary Education, Rajshahi
9. Board of Intermediate and Secondary Education, Sylhet

Two alternative education boards:

1. Bangladesh Madrasah Education Board
2. Bangladesh Technical Education Board.
