= Sayeed Atiqullah =

Sayeed Atiqullah (1933–1998) was a Bangladeshi writer, poet, and journalist.

== Early life ==
Atiqullah was born in 1933 in Tangail District, East Bengal, British Raj. He completed a master's degree in political science from the University of Dhaka.

== Career ==
Atiqullah worked as a journalist after graduation. He was involved with the Bengali language movement in 1952. In 1971, he fought in the Bangladesh Liberation War. He wrote a number of notable short stories. In 1974 he was awarded the Bangla Academy Literary Award by the Bangla Academy for his writings. He translated books from English, Russian, and Urdu to Bengali. In the 1980s he was involved with protests against General Hussain Mohammad Ershad, the military dictator of Bangladesh.

== Death ==
Atiqullah died in 1998.

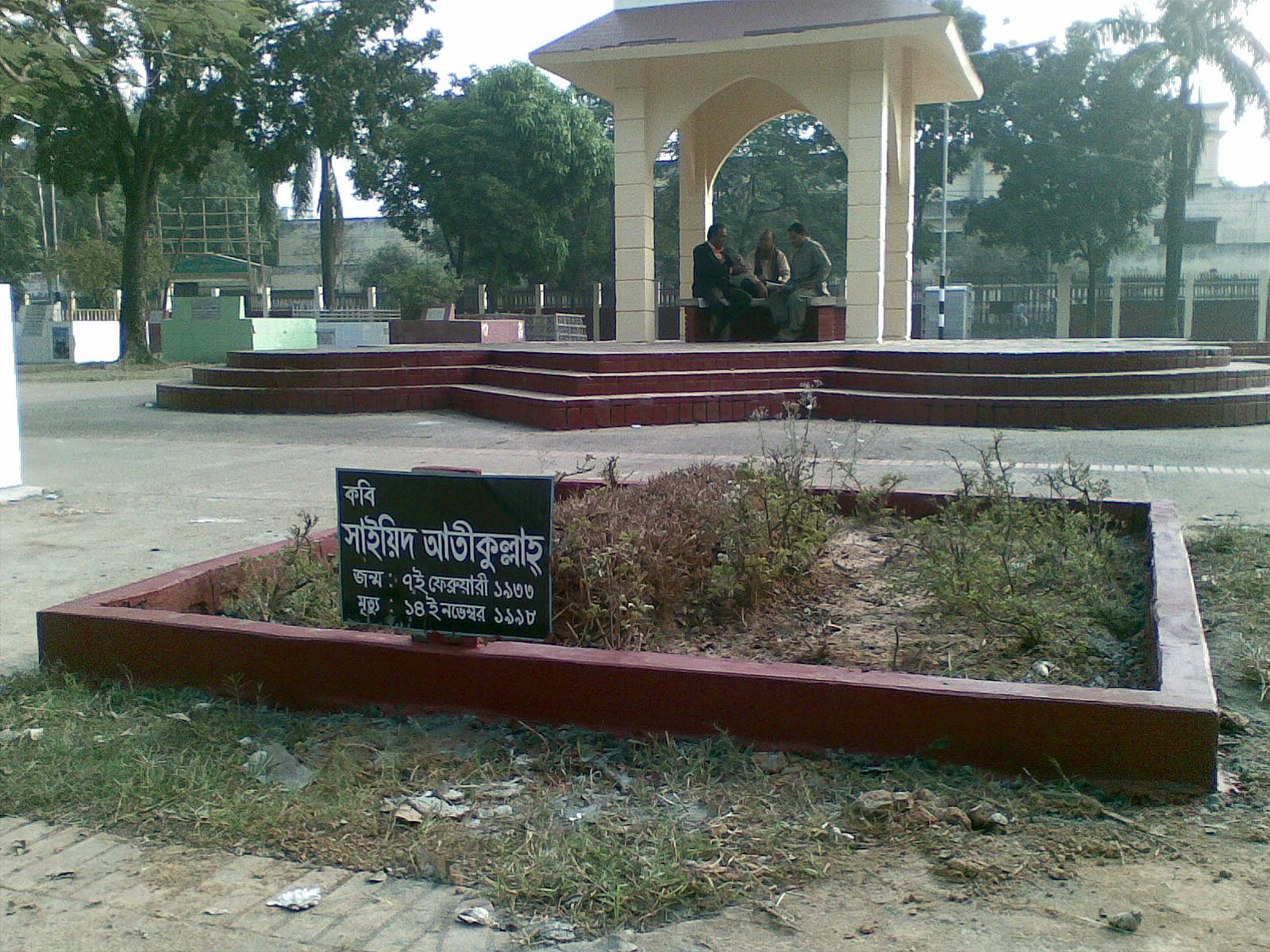
Grave of Atikullah in Martyred Intellectuals Graveyard, Mirpur
