= Moniruddin Yusuf =

Bangladeshi writer, journalist and translator (1919-1987)

- Born: 13 February 1919; Boulai, Kishoreganj, Bengal Presidency, British Raj
- Died: 11 February 1987 (aged 67); Dhaka, Bangladesh
- Education: University of Dhaka (attended)
- Occupations: Journalist, writer

Moniruddin Yusuf (Bengali: মনিরউদ্দীন ইউসুফ; 13 February 1919 – 11 February 1987) was a Bangladeshi writer, journalist and translator.

== Background and education ==
Moniruddin Yusuf Khan was born in a wealthy Bengali Muslim Khan Mughal Zamindar family in Boulai in Kishoreganj. His family spoke Urdu at home. His father was Maulvi Misbah Khan. Initially educated by an Urdu-speaking tutor, he later studied at the local Middle English school, Ramananda High School at Kishoreganj before moving on to studying at the Mymensingh Zilla School. He passed the intermediate examination from Dhaka Intermediate College in 1940. He then attended University of Dhaka.

== Career ==
Yusuf moved to Dhaka and joined the Pakistan Observer and later The Sangbad as a journalist. He later worked at the Public Relations Department of the Bangladesh Agricultural Development Corporation until 1979.

== Works ==
- Jhader Rater Shese
- Panser Kanta
- Or Bayes Yakhan Egaro
- Rumi’s Masnavi (1966)
- Urdu Sahityer Itihas (1968)
- Bangla Sahitye Sufi Prabhab (1969)
- Amader Aitihya O Sanskriti (1978)
- Karbala: Ekti Samajik Ghurnabarta
- Sanskriti Charcha (1980)
- Bangladesher Sarbik Agragatir Laksye Ekti Prastab (1984)
- Naba Mulyayane Rabindranath (1989)
- Hazrat Fatema O Hazrat Ayesha
- Chhotader Islam Parichay and Mahakavi Ferdousi
- Amar Jiban
- Amar Abhijvata (1992)

== Awards ==
- Governor's Gold Medal
- Habib Bank Literary Award
- Bangla Academy Literary Award (1978)
- Abul Mansur Ahmed Literary Award
- Ekushey Padak (1993)
