= Hossain Uddin Hossain =

- হোসেনউদ্দীন হোসেন
- Born: 28 February 1941; Jhikargacha, Jessore, Bengal Province, British India
- Died: 20 May 2024 (aged 83); Jashore, Bangladesh

Hossain Uddin Hossain (28 February 1941 – 20 May 2024) was a Bangladeshi essayist, novelist and researcher. He was the recipient of Bangla Academy Literary Award in 2022 and S'adat Ali Akhand Literature Award in 2016.

== Background ==
Hossain was born on 28 February 1941 in Krishnanagar village in Jhikargacha, Jessore in the then Bengal Province, British India. He completed his matriculation and intermediate examinations in 1957 and in 1959 respectively.

== Personal life ==
Hossain had four children including Shahnaz Rahana.
