= Rezaur Rahman (scientist) =

Bangladeshi scientist (1944–2025)

- রেজাউর রহমান
- Born: 11 January 1944; Dacca District, Bengal Province, British India
- Died: 26 October 2025 (aged 81); Dhaka, Bangladesh
- Education: University of Dhaka
- Occupations: Scientist, writer, journalist
- Writing career
- Language: Bengali
- Notable awards: Bangla Academy Literary Award (2024)

Rezaur Rahman (11 January 1944 – 26 October 2025) was a Bangladeshi nuclear scientist, entomologist, educator, and writer. He was widely respected for his work in scientific research and for writing popular science and fiction in Bengali. In 2024, he received the Bangla Academy Literary Award for his contributions to science literature.

== Early life and education ==
Rahman was born in 1944 in Dacca District, Bengal Province, British India (present-day Bangladesh). He completed his MSc in biology at University of Dhaka in 1965. Later, in 1979 he earned a PhD in entomology from the Czech Academy of Sciences (then Czechoslovak Academy of Sciences) in Prague.

== Career ==
Rezaur began his professional life as a lecturer of zoology at a government degree college. He later joined the Bangladesh Atomic Energy Commission (BAEC), where he spent about 35 years working as a researcher. In addition, he served as a part-time faculty member at Jahangirnagar University. In his scientific work, Rezaur focused on entomology and insect control. One of his notable research works involved managing harmful fruit flies a project conducted in Vienna, and published in the Journal of Economic Entomology in the United States.

== Works ==
- Fire Asha Fire Jawya (Return and Departure)
- Deshantar (Beyond Borders)
- Lal Shobujer Koto Kahon (Tales of Red and Green)
- Chhayarjoni, Porojibi Prani (Parasites)
- Ural Machhir Pansi (The Flying Fish's Boat)
- Andhokare Noy Mash (Nine Months in Darkness)
- Jatrar Shesh Simana (Journey's Final Frontier)
- Shada Borof Kalo Brikkho (White Snow, Black Tree)
- Sphulinger Abha (Gleam of Sparks)

== Awards ==
- Bangla Academy Literary Award (2024)

== Death and legacy ==
Rezaur Rahman died on 26 October 2025 at around 10:30 am while undergoing treatment in the ICU of LabAid Hospital in Dhaka. He had suffered a heart attack on 13 October, underwent open-heart surgery on 15 October, but his condition deteriorated later. He is survived by his wife, Halima Rahman, and two daughters, Nilanjana Rahman and Manjulika Rahman.
