= Sirajuddin Kasimpuri =

Bangladeshi writer and researcher

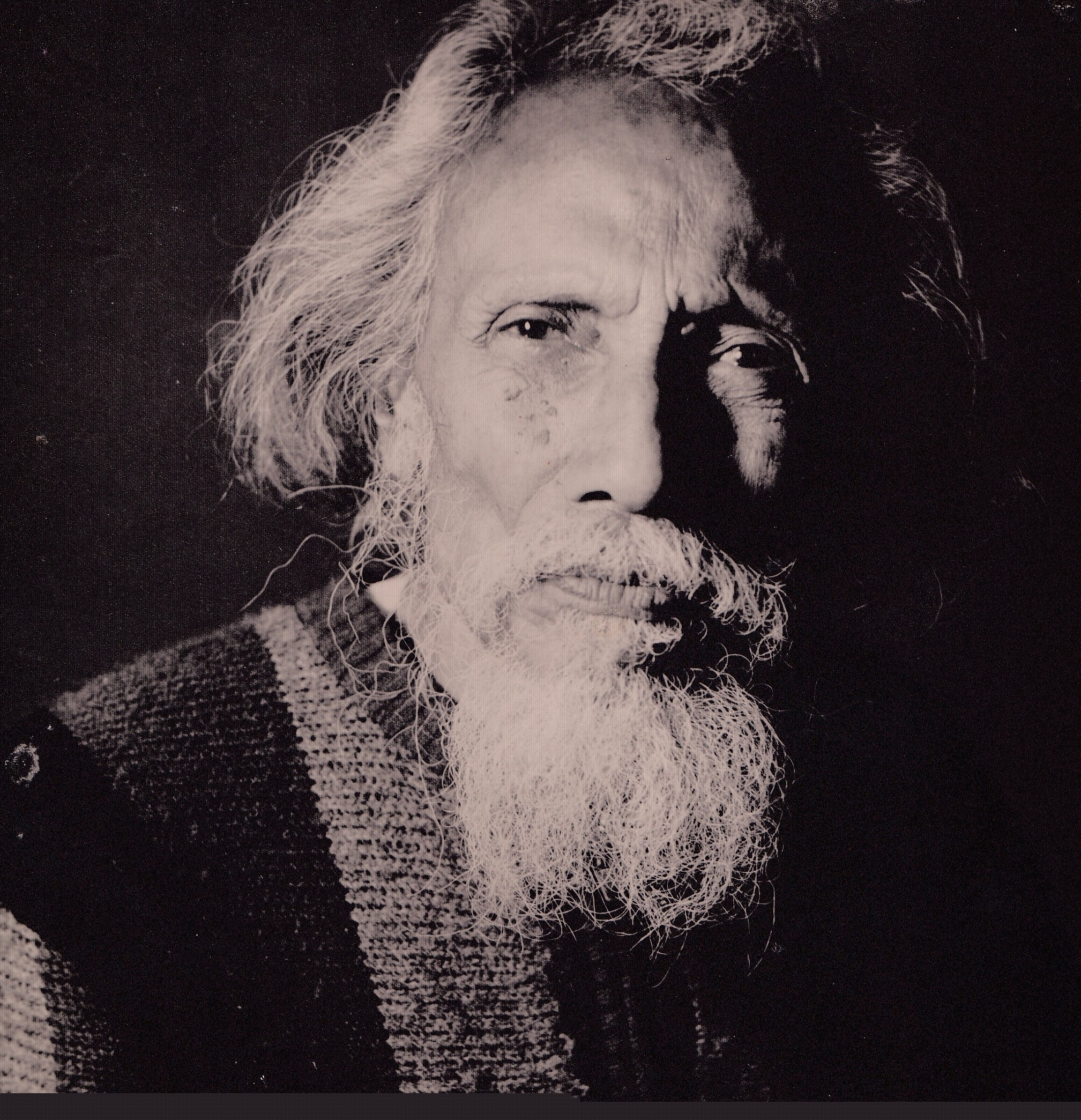

Sirajuddin Kasimpuri was a Bangladeshi writer and researcher of Bengali folklore. He was awarded the Bangla Academy Literary Award.

== Early life ==
Kasimpuri was born on 22 October 1901 in Kasimpur, Netrokona District, Bengal Presidency, British India. He completed his studies at the Narendranagar Middle English School and graduated from the Jagannath Chakraborty Institution. He graduated from the Netrakona Guru Training School. He got a teaching certificate from the Dhaka Normal School.

== Career ==
In 1929, Kasimpuri was made the head of Boli Junior Madrasa. He then went on to teach at Dhaka Primary Training Institute, Jamalpur Guru Training School, Mohanganj High School, and Mymensingh Primary Training Institute. He researched Bengali folk literature. He published a number of research papers on Bengali folk literature. He published Lokasahitye Chhada in 1962 and Lokasahitye Dhandha O Prabad in 1968. He was awarded Tamgha-i-Khidmat by the Government of Pakistan. In 1973, he published Bangladesher Lokasabgit Parichiti. He was awarded Bangla Academy Award for his research in Bengali folk stories.

== Death ==
Kasimpuri died on 18 December 1979 in Kasimpur, Kendua Upazila, presently Netrokona sadar upazila, Netrokona District, Bangladesh.
