= Majeda Rafiqun Nessa =

Bangladeshi diplomat

- মাজেদা রফিকুন নেসা

Ambassador of Bangladesh to the Philippines
- In office 22 September 2010 – 15 July 2012
- Preceded by: Ikhtiar Chowdhury
- Succeeded by: John Gomes

Personal details
- Spouse: Mohammad Abdul Mannan Miah
- Children: Naumi Mannan
- Education: University of Dhaka

Majeda Rafiqun Nessa is a Bangladeshi diplomat. She served as an ambassador of Bangladesh to the Philippines during 2010–2012.

== Background and career ==
Majeda Rafiqun Nessa earned her post graduate degree in economics from the University of Dhaka. She joined the foreign service in 1986.

=== Allegations ===
In November 2012, Bangladesh Anti-Corruption Commission filed two cases against Nessa for embezzling over Tk 7.40 lakh and irregularities in recruitment process. According to the report, ambassador Nessa was called back on 15 July 2012 as there were accusations of corruption, irregularities, nepotism and mismanagement against her; she allegedly appointed her husband, Mohammad Abdul Mannan Miah, as the secretary (consular), her daughter, Naumi Mannan, as the local-based secretary, and her sister, Maksuda Shafiun Nesa, as the secretary (personal) during her tenure as an ambassador. Upon order of the government, Nessa later cancelled the appointments.
