= Zulfikar Matin =

Novelist and writer from Bangladesh

- Born: 24 July 1946 (age 80); Sirajganj, Bengal Province, British India
- Education: University of Rajshahi
- Parents: Chowdhury Osman (father); Hamida Sultana (mother)
- Relatives: Imtiar Shamim (brother); Ikhtiar Chowdhury (brother)

Zulfikar Matin (born 24 July 1946) is a Bangladeshi novelist and writer. He was awarded the Bangla Academy Literary Award in the essay/research category in 2023. As of 2024, he has published more than 20 books.

== Background and career ==
Matin was born on 24 July 1946 to Chowdhury Osman, a poet and an educationist, and Hamida Sultana in Ramgati village in Ullahpara, Sirajganj in the then Bengal Province, British India (now in Bangladesh). Matin studied Bengali literature at the University of Rajshahi.

== Awards ==
- Bangla Academy Literary Award, 2023
