= Farseem Mannan Mohammedy =

Bangladeshi academician and writer

- ফারসীম মান্নান মোহাম্মদী
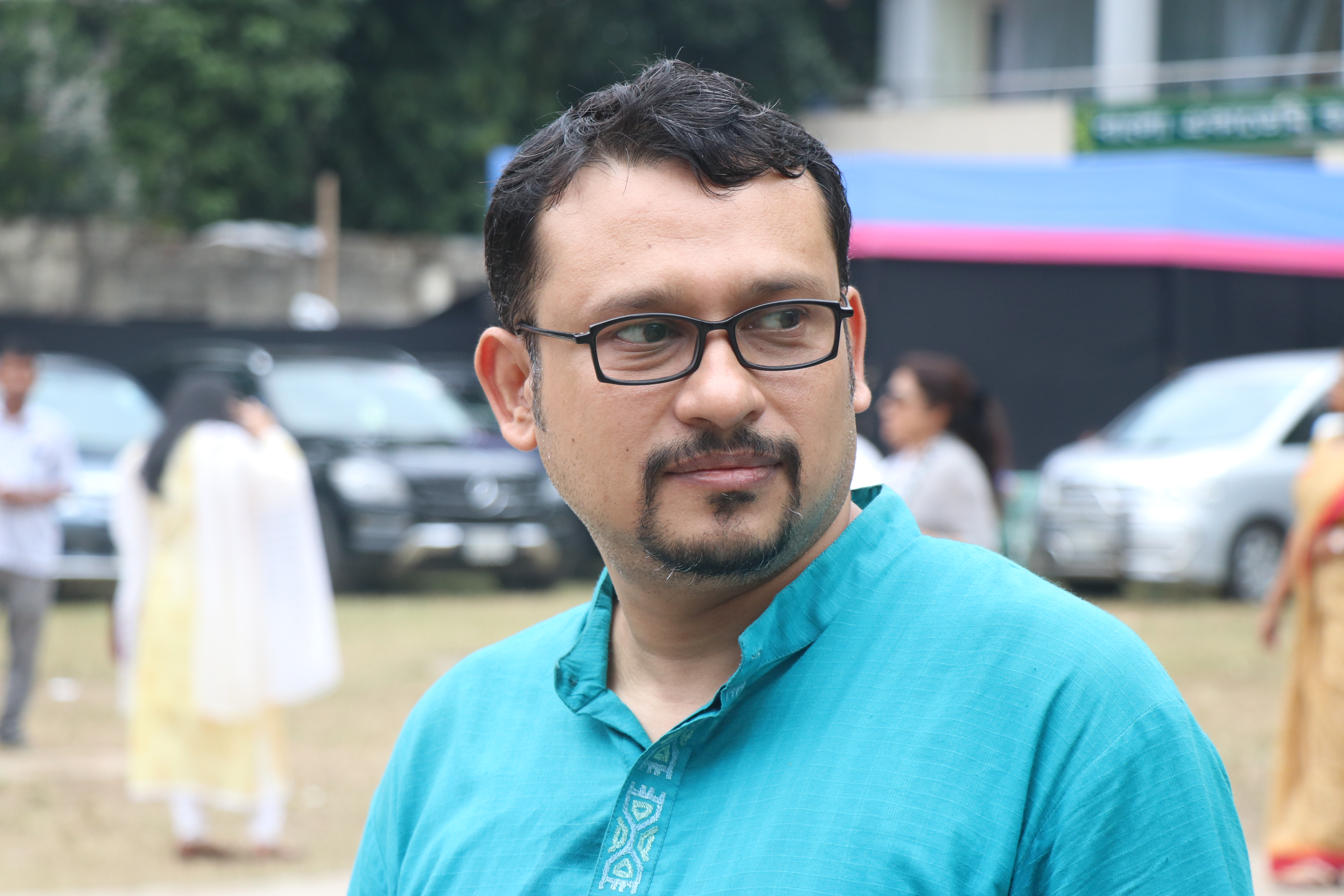
- Born: August 20, 1973 (age 53); Dhaka, Bangladesh
- Citizenship: Bangladesh
- Education: BUET; McMaster University (PhD)
- Occupations: engineer, academic, writer
- Awards: Bangla Academy Literary Award, 2025

Farseem Mannan Mohammedy (born 20 August 1973) is a Bangladeshi engineer, academic and science organizer. He is a professor in the Department of Electrical and Electronic Engineering at Bangladesh University of Engineering and Technology (BUET). Mohammedy received the 2025 Bangla Academy Literary Award in the science category by the government of Bangladesh.

== Early life ==
Mohammadi was born to Mohammad Abdul Mannan and Hosne Ara Mannan. He studied at Khulna Zilla School, Dhanmondi Government Boys' High School and Monipur High School, where he completed his Secondary School Certificate in 1990. He completed his Higher Secondary Certificate from Notre Dame College in 1992. He received his bachelor’s degree (1999) and master’s degree (2002) in Electrical Engineering from Bangladesh University of Engineering and Technology (BUET). He later earned a PhD in Electrical Engineering from McMaster University in 2008.

== Career ==
He joined Bangladesh University of Engineering and Technology as a faculty member in 2000 and later became a professor in the Department of Electrical and Electronic Engineering. He served as Director of the university’s Energy Institute from 2018 to 2024. Under his leadership, the institute developed from a center (established in 1986) into a full institute, enabling postgraduate education and research in energy studies and contributing to its role as a national energy think tank.

=== Other activities ===
Outside his professional work, Mohammadi has been active in science outreach and social activities, especially in astronomy, since his student life. He has worked with several science clubs and organizations. He served as General Secretary of the Bangladesh Astronomical Society and the Society for the Popularization of Science, Bangladesh (SPSB). He has also been involved internationally as a board member of the International Junior Science Olympiad.

He served as the National Outreach Coordinator for Bangladesh (2017–2027) under the Office of Astronomy Outreach of the International Astronomical Union and also worked as Chair of the National Coordinator Team under its Office of Astronomy for Education. He is an associate member of the International Astronomical Union.

He is a member of Institute of Electrical and Electronics Engineers and a life fellow of the Institution of Engineers, Bangladesh.

== Awards ==
- 1405–1406 Halima-Sarfuddin Science Writer Award (2001)
- 2025 Bangla Academy Literary Award (2026)
