= Sumona Haque =

- সুমনা হক
- Born: 1 August
- Education: University of Dhaka
- Occupations: Singer, writer, activist
- Years active: 1986–2016
- Awards: Full list

Sumona Haque (born 1 August) is a Bangladeshi singer. Dubbed the "Queen of Jingle", she lent her voice in more than 2000 jingles. She released a total of four music albums, Mayabi Ey Raate (1988), Majhe Kichu Bochor Gelo (2000), Tumi Robe Nirobe (2008), and Kichu Sriti Kichu Bedona (2015). Her only playback was the song "Monete Ki Nojore Ki" in the film Balika Holo Bondhu (1994), a duet with Shuvro Dev. She has retired from her music career.

== Early life and education ==
Sumona Haque's mother, Khaleda Adib Chowdhury, was a poet. She was trained in classical music from Ustad Gopal Chandra Das and Utsad Phul Mohammad.

Haque studied at Drawing and Painting Department of the Faculty of Fine Arts, University of Dhaka.

== Career ==
Haque was enlisted as singer in Bangladesh Television in the mid-1980s. Music composer Foad Nasser Babu introduced her into her jingles career in 1986. Her debut album, Mayabi Ei Raate, was released in 1988. The title song "Mayabi Ei Raate" was penned by her mother, poet Khaleda Edib Chowdhury and Ahmed Yousuf Saber. She lent her voice for many jingles like Manola, Bourani Print Sari, Meril Baby Lotion, Olympic Battery, Sundori Print Sari and others. She released her second album Majhe Kichhu Bochhor Gelo in 2000, after 12 years. In 2008, with a Rabindra Sangeet album called Tumi Robe Nirobe. In 2015, she released her 4th and the latest album Kichu Smriti Kichu Bedona, composed by Indian composer Joshpal Mani and recorded in Mumbai. She has performed a new version of this song in 2016 in a television show, Power Lounge.

Haque is a painter. She has completed five solo exhibitions of her paintings, held in Bangladesh, Japan and the United States. In March 2014, she has launched a solo painting exhibition containing her paintings, which is her sixth. She drew all the paintings using oil paint.

== Discography ==
=== Studio albums ===
Year	Title	Album details	Track listing
1988	Mayabi Ei Rate		1. "Mayabi ei raate" 2. "Katale Kemon"; 3. "Oshto Ghater Noshto"; 4. "Aj Mon Harabar"; 5. "Ken Emon Koira"; 6. "Jokhon Jhorlo Noyon"; 7. "Abar Ele Fire"; 8. "Tumi Aj Koto Dure"; 9. "Diona Mon Diona"; 10. "Emon Amar Moner"; 11. "Sundor Tumi Esecho"; 12. "Ador"; 13. "Nil Akash"; 14. "Tomate Mon Hariye"
2000	Majhe Kichhu Bochhor Gelo		1. "Majhe Kichhu Bochhor Gelo"
2008	Tumi Robe Nirobe		1. "Modhur Tomar Shesh Je Na"; 2. "Choron Dhorite Diyo Go"; 3. "Tumi Robe Nirobe"; 4. "Jodi Tare Nai Chini Go"
2015	Kichu Smriti Kichu Bedona		1. "Elo Boishakh"; 2. "Sojoni Jeo Na"; 3. "Tomaro Amay Mone Porbe"; 4. "Majhe Kichu Bochor Gelo"

=== film songs ===
Year	Film	Song	Composer(s)	Lyricist	Co-singer
1994	Balika Holo Bodhu	"Monete Ki Nojore Ki"	Abu Taher		Shuvro Dev
