= Milon Kanti Dey =

Bangladeshi theatre artist (1947–2026)

- মিলন কান্তি দে
- Born: 15 July 1947; Chhanhara, Bengal Province, British India
- Died: 7 February 2026 (aged 78); Chittagong, Bangladesh
- Occupations: Actor, director, writer
- Awards: Bangla Academy Literary Award (2022) and Jatra Shilpi Sammanana (2023)

Milon Kanti Dey (15 July 1947 – 7 February 2026) was a Bangladeshi Jatra actor, director, writer and cultural activist. He was recognised for his pioneering work towards the refinement and modernization of Jatra pala, a traditional theatrical art form of Bangladesh, and for his campaigns towards the Jatra art's ethical and artistic uplift. Dey won the Bangla Academy Literary Award for the Drama category in 2022.

== Life and career ==
Dey was the president of Jatrashilpa Unnayan Parishad. He directed more than 120 Jatra productions and acted in more than 151 productions. He made his acting debut in 1966. He founded Desh Opera in 1993. He worked as a jatra trainer in many universities.

He played a key role in efforts to change the jatra theatre industry. He joined a campaign in 2012 that pushed the government to make rules. These rules aimed to cut down on crude content and maintain cultural values in jatra shows. After public worry and talks about culture, Bangladesh's government brought in new guidelines. These guidelines tackled these problems helping to improve the jatra scene.

Dey received the 2022 Bangla Academy Literary Award for his contribution to drama. In 2023, he received the Jatra Shilpi Sammanana (Jatra Artist Award) from the Bangladesh Shilpakala Academy, acknowledging his lifelong dedication to the performing arts.

In 2024, Dey published his autobiographical book titled Ami Je Ek Jatraywala, which chronicles his life and journey in the world of jatra. The following year, in 2025, his selected works were compiled and published as Nirbachito Jatrapala, released by Bangla Academy during the Ekushey Book Fair.

Dey died on 7 February 2026, at the age of 78.

== Awards ==
- Bangla Academy Literary Award – 2022
- Jatra Shilpi Sammanana – 2023
