= Golam Samdani Koraishi =

Bangladeshi Independence Day Award recipient

Golam Samdani Quraishy
- গোলাম সামদানী কোরায়শী
- Born: 5 April 1929; Kaurat, Netrokona District, Bengal Presidency
- Died: 11 October 1991 (aged 62)
- Spouse: Sayeeda Quraishy
- Children: Five sons and two daughters
- Parents: Abdul Karim Quraishy (father); Altafunnessa (mother)
- Website: gosaqu.org

Golam Samdani Quraishy (Bengali: গোলাম সামদানী কোরায়শী; 5 April 1929 – 11 October 1991) was a Bangladeshi poet and writer. He was given Independence Day Award posthumously in 2017 by the Government of Bangladesh.

== Early life and family ==
Golam Samdani Quraishy was born on 5 April 1929 at his mother Altafunnesa's home in the village of Kaurat (presently in Kendua Upazila) in Netrokona, Mymensingh District, Bengal Presidency. His ancestral home was in the village of Bir Ahammadpur in Gouripur.

== Education ==
Quraishy's education began at home. He later studied at the Ghaturkona Primary School and Kathalia Middle English School, completing his primary education from 1935 to 1936. From 1937 to 1941, he was educated at the Chandranath High School and Bir Ahammadpur High School in Netrokona. After that, he enrolled at the Basta Junior Madrasa in Netrokona for Islamic studies and later at the Katlasen Madrasa from which he graduated in 1950 with a First Class in Alimiyyah, ranking eighth position. He proceeded to study at the Government Madrasah-e-Alia in Dhaka where he received his First Class in Jamat-e-Ula (Fadiliyyah), ranking third in 1952. In 1954, he completed his Master of Arts (Kamiliyyah), ranking in the first position. He then turned his attention to the Bengali language and joined the Nasirabad Intermediate College in Nasirabad where he attained first place in his IA qualification. He then proceeded to the University of Dhaka where he graduated with honours in Bengali Language, ranking fifth on the second class in 1959. In 1960, he ranked second in the second class grade for the Master of Arts in Bengali Literature. Quraishy has also completed Officers' Training Corps, twenty days training, annual camp in Mainamati, Comilla (1953) and has also taken the High Madrasa Education Maths and English Exam (1955).

== Career ==
For three years, he served as a shepherd at his relatives' homes from 1942 to 1945. After that, he became an imam at the Dhanikhola Bazar Mosque in Trishal and Eidgah Mosque in Kharicha, and then a teacher at the Dhanikhola High Madrasa in 1955. Following this, he became the editing assistant for the linguist Muhammad Shahidullah's Purba Pakistaner Anchalik Bhashar Abhidhan (East Pakistan's regional language dictionary) project. He worked at the Manuscripts and Compilation Department (Bangla Academy) between 1961 and 1968. From 1968 to 1971, he was the professor of the Bengali Department at Nasirabad College, Mymensingh.

== Personal life ==
Quraishy married Sayyida Quraishy and they lived in South Akua, Darbar Sharif Road, Mymensingh. They had two daughters and five sons. From 1956, he overlooked the Emdadia Library in Chawk Bazar, Mymensingh, until the end of his life. He was also the director of the Quraishy Prangan in the last year of his life.

== Awards ==
- Kumardi Madrasa Literature Award (1950)
- M.A. Kamil Exam Gold Award (1954)
- Abul Mansur Ahmad Memorial Award (1987)
- Agrani Bank Children's Literature Award (1990)
- Independence Day Award (2017)

== Death ==
Quraishy died on 11 October 1991 at the age of 62. He was buried in the municipality cemetery in Akua, Mymensingh.
