= Abdul Hafiz (journalist) =

Abdul Hafiz was a Bangladeshi writer, essayist, and journalist.

== Early life ==
Hafiz was born in December 1907 in Lakshmipur, Nabinagar Upazila, Brahmanbaria District, East Bengal, British Raj. His father, Munshi Aftabuddin, was a Persian language scholar. He studied at the University of Dhaka where he played in the university football team.

== Career ==
Hafiz joined Kolkata Police Force as sub-inspector in December 1933. He was then in his final year of his M.A. After the Partition of India he moved to East Pakistan and joined the Pakistan police force. From 1950 to 1963 he served as the Deputy Superintendent of Intelligence Branch. He was promoted to Additional Superintendent in 1963. He voluntarily retired from the police force. He was the Chief Editor of the Franklin Book Programme from 1966 to 1968. He joined The Daily Ittefaq and edited the works of Tofazzal Hossain Manik Miah. He translated foreign books into Bangla. In 1977 he was awarded the Bangla Academy Award for his translation work. He was the founding editor of Saptahik Robbar where he worked from 1978 to 1994.

== Death ==
Hafiz died on 30 October 1994.
