= Ikhtiar Chowdhury =

Diplomat and writer from Bangladesh

Ikhtiar Momin Chowdhury
- ইখতিয়ার চৌধুরী

Ambassador of Bangladesh to Spain
- In office 11 August 2010 – 29 October 2014
- Preceded by: Md. Saiful Amin Khan
- Succeeded by: Hassan Mahmood Khandker

Ambassador of Bangladesh to the Philippines
- In office 3 September 2008 – 3 August 2010
- Preceded by: Muhammad Abul Quashem
- Succeeded by: Majeda Rafiqun Nessa

Personal details
- Born: 11 August 1954 (age 72) Sirajganj, Bengal Province, British India
- Parents: Chowdhury Osman (father); Hamida Sultana (mother)
- Relatives: Imtiar Shamim (brother); Zulfikar Matin (brother)
- Education: University of Dhaka

Ikhtiar Momin Chowdhury (born 11 August 1954) is a Bangladeshi diplomat and writer. He served as the ambassador of Bangladesh to multiple countries. As of 2024, he has written 39 books.

Chowdhury was awarded the Bangla Academy Literary Award in the travelogue category in 2022.

== Background and career ==
Ikhtiar Chowdhury was born in 1954 to Chowdhury Osman, a poet and an educationist, and Hamida Sultana in Ramgati village in Ullahpara, Sirajganj in the then East Bengal, Dominion of Pakistan (now in Bangladesh). Ikhtiar studied at the University of Dhaka.

Chowdhury served as the director general of the South East Asia and Parliamentary Affairs, and the External Publicity Wing of Foreign Ministry until 2008. He then served as the Ambassador of Bangladesh to the Philippines and Spain until his retirement.

== Books ==
Jamuna Sampraday - যমুনা সম্প্রদায়

Americar Kiyadangsho - আমেরিকার কিয়দংশ

Pacific e Panch Rajani - প্যাসিফিকে পাঁচ রজনি

Nordan Trip - নর্দান ট্রিপ

Juddhodiner Gerila - যুদ্ধদিনের গেরিলা
