= Jatin Sarker =

Bangladeshi researcher (1936–2025)

- যতীন সরকার
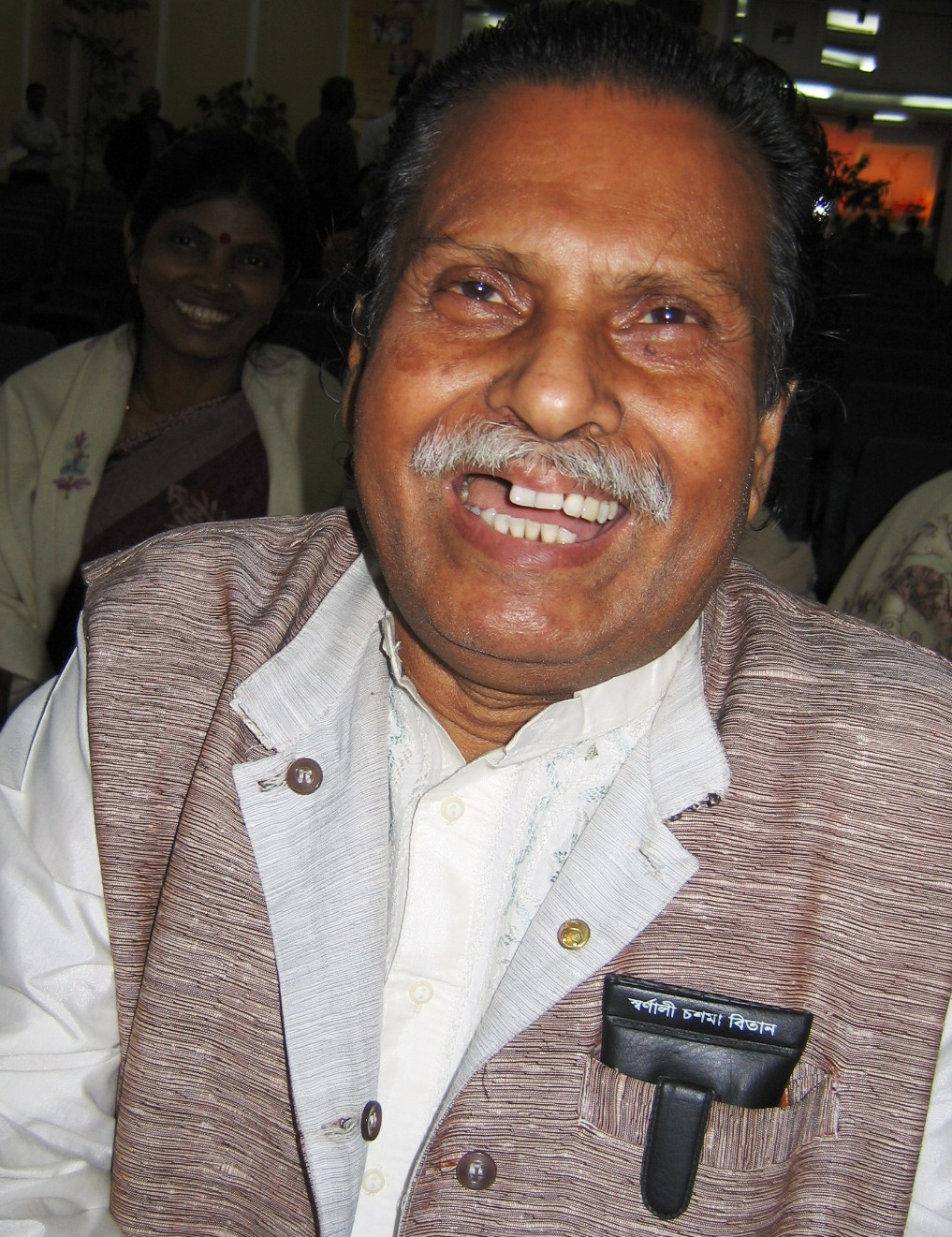
- Sarker in 2006
- Born: 18 August 1936; Netrokona, Bengal Presidency, British India
- Died: 13 August 2025 (aged 88); Mymensingh, Bangladesh
- Occupations: Scholar, writer, academic
- Political party: Communist Party of Bangladesh

Jatin Sarker (18 August 1936 – 13 August 2025) was a Bangladeshi Bengali intellectual, researcher, and biographer of Bangladesh. He was awarded the Bangla Academy Literary Award in 2008 for research and essays and the Independence Day Award in 2010 for education. As of September 2021, he had published 35 books.

== Early life ==
Sarker was born on 18 August 1936 to Gyanendra Chandra Sarker and Bimala Bala Sarker in Chandapara village, Kendua Upazila of Netrokona of the then Mymensingh district of Bengal Presidency in British India. He was the eldest of three children, two brothers and a sister. He married in 1965, and with his wife, Kanon Sarker, had one son, namely, Suman Sarker (who lives in Slovakia), and a daughter, namely, Sudipta Sarkar (who lives in Bangladesh).

He was a member of Transparency International Bangladesh's (TIB) Committees of Concerned Citizens of Bangladesh.

== Career ==
Sarker took up the profession of teaching after graduation by joining the Ashulia College in Netrikona in 1957. Later he joined the Nasirabad College, Mymensingh, in 1964, where he taught Bengali literature at the pre-university and undergraduate levels until his retirement in 2002.

From the late 1960s onwards, Sarker remained involved in the cultural activities of Mymensingh. He was long a member of the Mymensingh Press Club. In 2007, he started a magazine titled Shomaj, Orthonithir O Rastro (tr. The Society, Economy and State).

Sarker served as the president of Udichi Central Sangsad of Bangladesh Udichi Shilpigoshthi.

Sarker's last book, Prottoy Protigya Protibha, was published in February 2019.

== Political philosophy ==
Sarker always spoke for upholding and ensuring human rights and for resisting social oppression, discrimination, and communal politics. On 29 April 2006, he presided over a regional dialogue on national election policy and the initiative of civil society in Mymensingh. As chair of a meeting organised in Mymensingh in observance of World Press Freedom Day in 2006, he said that now everything is captured by money, and, consequently, it is so difficult to ensure freedom of the press since the press is owned and controlled by the corporations and business magnates who act in favour of capitalism and serve as agents of capitalist imperialism and globalisation. There is certainly a strong relationship among media and development and poverty alleviation but poverty will never be reduced until corruption, injustice, inequality, etc., are eliminated from society. He urged all to achieve freedom and establish one's rights through continuous struggle. He believed that religion-based politics should be banned in line with the constitution of Bangladesh of 1972. He also maintained that the members of the parliaments should not be involved in activities other than legislating.

Sarker was arrested on 3 March 1976 and detained for 18 months.

== Personal life and death ==
Sarker lived in Netrokona. In his later years, he suffered from age-related medical problems such as polyarthritis and underwent surgery. In June 2025, he was hospitalised in Dhaka after fracturing his neck after a fall at his residence. He was later transferred to the Mymensingh Medical College, where he died on 13 August at the age of 88.

== Awards ==
- "Doctor Muhammad Enamul Haque Gold Medal" by Bangla Academy
- "Prothom Alo Best Book of the Year 1411" for his book titled Pakistaner Janmo Mrityu-Darshan (2006)
- Bangla Academy Literary Award (2008)
- Narayanganj Shruti Gold Medal
- Mymensingh Press Club Literary Award
- Khaleq Dad Chowdhury Literary Award
- Moniruddin Yusuf Literary Award.

== Documentary ==
Noted filmmaker Tanvir Mokammel produced a documentary, 1971, with a section on Sarker. It was released in March 2006.

== Publications ==
Sarker published 17 titles to his credit. One of his important publications is Pakistaner Janmo Mrityu-Darshan, published in 2005. Another important book is Bangladesher Kavigan published by Bangla Academy in 1985. Some other books are Sahittyar Kachey Pratyasha, Bangalee Somajtantrik Otihya, Sankritir Sangram, Manab Mon, Manab Dharma and Shomaj Biplab, Aamaader Chintacharchar Dig-diganta, Sirajuddin Kashimpuri, Haricharan Acharjya, Golpe Golpe Bakyaran and Dijatitatwa Niotibad O BijnanChetona.
