= Eshak Khan =

Bangladeshi author (born 1953)

- Born: 7 August 1953 (age 73); Sirajganj, East Pakistan (now Bangladesh)
- Education: University of Dhaka
- Occupations: Fiction writer, dramatist
- Years active: 1971–present
- Movement: Liberation war of Bangladesh
- Awards: Bangla Academy Literary Award (2023)

Eshak Khan (born 7 August 1953) is a Bangladeshi writer and activist best known for his freedom fighting theme especially for the Bangladesh Liberation War. In 2023, He was awarded the Bangla Academy Literary Award for Biography.

== Life ==
Khan was born on 7 August 1953 in Sirajganj District. He has a degree of Mass Communication and Journalism from University of Dhaka.

== Publications ==
- Jara Juddo Korechilo
- Juddo Diner Golpo

== Awards ==
- Bangla Academy Literary Award (2023)
