= Abdur Rashid Khan (poet) =

Bangladeshi writer, educator, essayist, and poet (1924–2019)

Poet Abdur Rashid Khan
- আবদুর রশীদ খান

Personal details
- Born: 1 January 1924 West Zafarabad, Chandpur, British Raj
- Died: 1 February 2019 (aged 95) Manchester Memorial Hospital, United States.
- Resting place: Enfield Muslim Cemetery in Connecticut, United States.
- Education: University of Dhaka; Dhaka College; Dhaka Collegiate School
- Awards: Bangla Academy Literary Award

Abdur Rashid Khan (1 January 1924 – 1 February 2019) was a Bangladeshi writer, teacher, essayist and poet. He received the Bangla Academy Literary Award in 1977 for his Bengali poetry.

== Early life and education ==
Khan was born on 1 January 1924 in West Zafarabad, Chandpur. His father's name is Waizuddin Khan and mother's name is Kamrun Nesa. He started his education at Raghunathpur Government Primary School and studied at Gridkalindia SE School. After that he passed 7th and 8th class in Dhaka Collegiate School. Later he passed high school matriculation from Jamurki Nawab Sir Abdul Gani of Tangail district. He completed his higher secondary from Dhaka College in 1945. He graduated with honors from University of Dhaka in 1949 and MA (postgraduate) degree in 1950.

== Career ==
He was a professor at Pabna Edward College from 1951 to 1952 and at Dhaka College from 1952 to 1955. He was the Bengali translator and publication registrar of Government of Bangladesh from 1955 to 1975 and retired as the director and translator of the Bangladesh Publications Registration Directorate from 1975 to 1983.

In school, his stories and articles were published in school magazines. During his time at the university, his poems were published in Salimullah Muslim Hall Magazine. He regularly wrote poems and articles in various newspapers and periodicals in Dhaka and Calcutta. His first book of poetry was published in 1952. He has published 60 books of poetry and eight unpublished books of poetry.

== Bibliography ==
- Natun Kabita (নতুন কবিতা), 1950
- Nakhata: Manush and Shon (নক্ষতা: মানুষ ও সন), 1952
- Bondhi Muhurto (বন্দী মুহুর্ত), 1959
- Premer Kabita (প্রেমের কবিতা), 1959
- Mohuwa (মহুয়া), 1965
- Bisrito Prohor (বিসৃত প্রহর), 1968
- Onirdrishto Shawdesh (অনির্দিষ্ট স্বদেশ), 1970
- Somosto Proshonsha Tar (সমস্ত প্রশংসা তাঁর), 1980
- Timir Honon (তিমির হনন), 1988
- Alowkik Ak Dip (অলৌকিক এক দ্বীপ), 1991
- Al Amin (আল আমীন), 1991

== Awards and recognitions ==
- Bangla Academy Literary Award (1977)
- Bangla Sahitya Parishad Award (1991)
- Kaikobad Sahitya Puraskar (1992)
- Dewan Abdul Hamid Sahitya Puraskar (1992)
- Farrukh Research Award

== Family ==
His only son Munim Khan and three daughters. His grandchildren include Zaahin Khan and Mumtaz Khan. He lived in North America from 12 March 2003 until his death.

== Death ==
Khan died on 1 February 2019 at Manchester Memorial Hospital in Connecticut, United States. He was buried in Enfield Muslim Cemetery in Connecticut.

== See also ==
- List of Bangla Academy Literary Award recipients (1970–1979)
