= Nasima Anis =

Bangladeshi writer

- নাসিমা আনিস
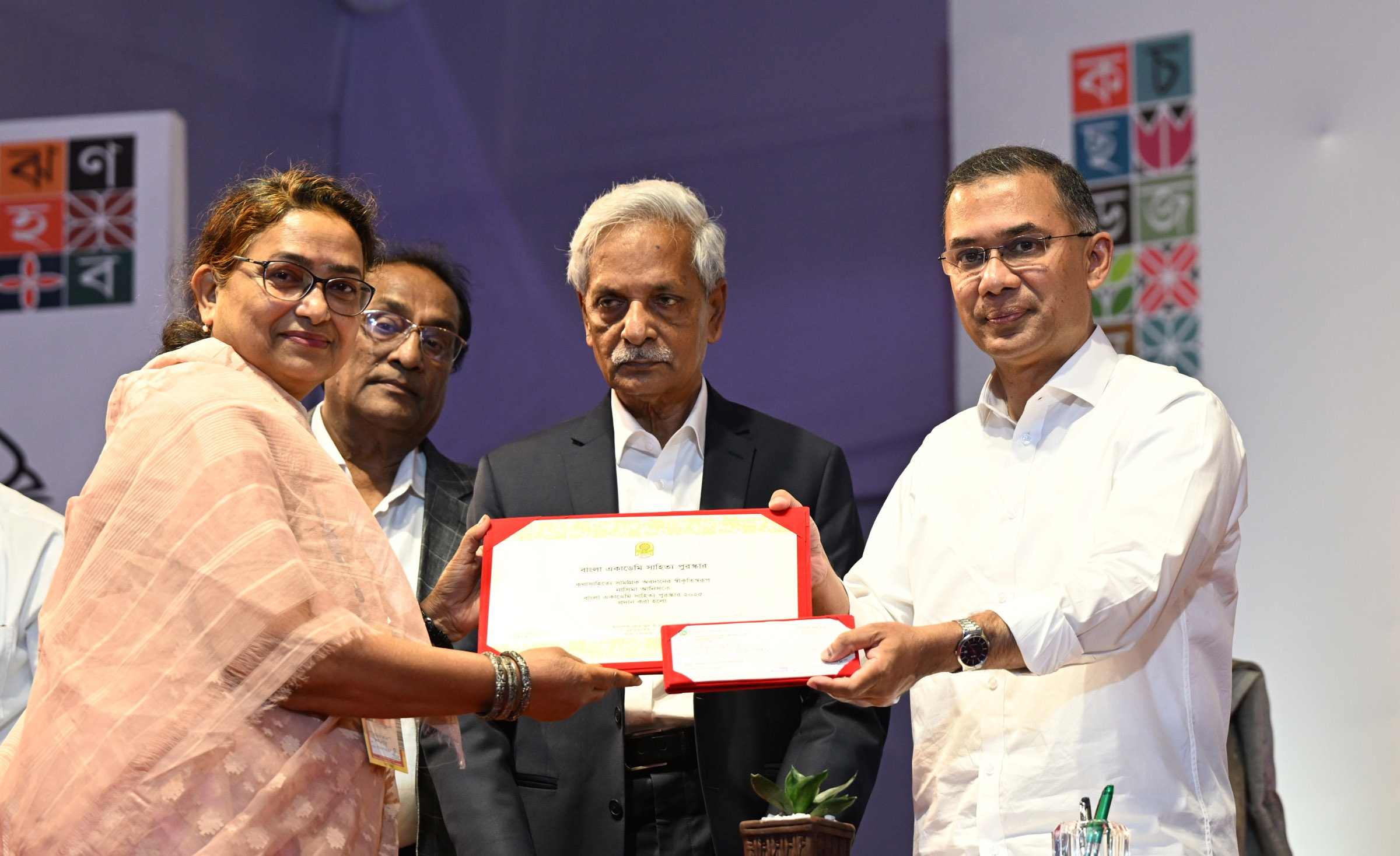
- Anis receiving Bangla Academy Literary Award 2025
- Born: 16 November 1962 (age 63); Chandpur, East Pakistan, Pakistan
- Education: University of Chittagong
- Occupation: Writer
- Spouse: Habib Anisur Rahman
- Children: 2

Nasima Anis (born 16 November 1962) is a Bangladeshi fiction writer. She received 2025 Bangla Academy Literary Award in the fiction category by the government of Bangladesh. As of 2018, she has published a total of 13 books.

== Background ==
Nasima Anis was born on 16 November 1962, in Chandpur in the then East Pakistan (now Bangladesh) to Md. Nurul Islam and Begum Ashrafunnesa. She completed her education with an SSC from Azimpur Girls School, and HSC from Eden College. She then earned her bachelor's in Bengali from Chittagong College, and master's from the University of Chittagong.

== Career ==
Anis worked as a teacher of Dhaka Cambrian School and College. Her debut novel, Mohinir Thaan, is about Mohini, a trans woman, on preparation of her daughter Disha's wedding. It won Tarun Katha Sahitya Puroskhkar (later renamed to Gemcon Tarun Katha-Sahitya Puroshkar) in 2006. She made notable breakthrough writing the short story Dil. Her novel Chandrabhanur Penis, earned her the Dainik Samakal Nabin Kathasahitya Puraskar in 2009. Her short story collection, Dub Satar was released at 2018 Ekushey Book Fair, published by Bateshwar Bornon publication.

== Awards ==
- Bangla Academy Literary Award (2026)
- Abu Rushd Literature Award by Bangla Academy (2025)
- Ranajit Biswas-Abhishek Smriti Sammanana by the Chandpur Sahitya Mancha (2021)
- Mohammed Nasiruddin Sahitya Puraskar (2020)
- Dainik Samakal Nabin Kathasahitya Puraskar (2009)
- Tarun Katha Sahitya Puroskhkar (2006)

== Personal life ==
Nasima Anis was married to Habib Anisur Rahman (1954–2025), an academic and a writer. She has a daughter, Adbana Anis, and a son, SM Asifur Rahman. She resides in Hatirpool area in Dhaka.
