= Tarik Sujat =

Bangladeshi poet (born 1965)

- Born: 10 September, 1965
- Occupations: Poet and Politician
- Writing career
- Notable awards: Bangla Academy Literary Award 2022

Tarik Sujat is a Bangladeshi poet and designer. He won Bangla Academy Literary Award 2022.

== Life ==
He was born on 10 September, 1965 in Dhaka, Bangladesh.

He received an MSS in Political Science from Dhaka University.

== Awards ==
- Bangla Academy Literary Award 2022
