= Toponkar Chakrobarti =

Bangladeshi children's writer (born 1955)

- তপংকর চক্রবর্তী
- Born: 9 July 1955 (age 70); Barisal District
- Education: University of Dhaka
- Occupations: Writer; teacher; journalist
- Years active: 1972–present
- Known for: Children's literature
- Awards: Bangla Academy Literary Award (2023)

Toponkar Chakrobarti (Bengali: তপংকর চক্রবর্তী; born 9 July 1955) is a Bangladeshi children's writer, rhymester and journalist. He won the Bangla Academy Literary Award (2023) for children's literature.

== Biography ==
Toponkar was born on July 9, 1955, in what is now Barisal District of Bangladesh. Currently, he serves as the principal of the Amrita Lal Dey College in Bangladesh.

== Publications ==
=== Books ===
- Hoy Hoy Roy Roy
- Kheyal Khushir Chora

== Awards ==
- Bangla Academy Literary Award (2023)
