= Anjir Liton =

Bangladeshi poet and children's writer

- আনজীর লিটন
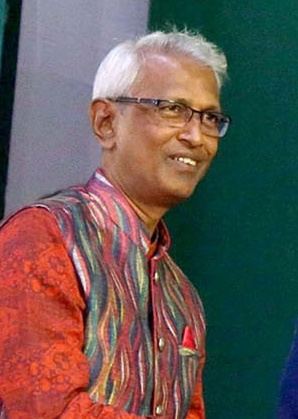
- Liton in 2021
- Born: 17 June 1965 (age 61)
- Occupations: Rhymester; children's writer
- Writing career
- Language: Bengali Language
- Genre: Children's literature
- Notable works: Chief editor of Chorabarshiki, the largest collection of rhymes of Bengali literature.
- Notable awards: Bangla Academy Literary Award

Anjir Liton (born 17 June 1965) is a Bangladeshi poet and children's writer. He was the former director general of Bangladesh Children's Academy. He was awarded the Bangla Academy Literary Award for his contribution to children's literature. He is the editor in chief of Chorabarshiki, the largest collection of rhymes of Bengali literature.

== Birth and education ==
Liton was born on 17 June 1965 in Mymensingh district of Bangladesh. He spent his childhood and adolescence there. His school was Mymensingh Zilla School and his college was Ananda Mohan College, Mymensingh. His first writing was published in Dainik Jahan. He completed his graduation in Political Science from Rajshahi University.

== Working life ==
In 1992, Liton's first book Khara Duto Shing (খাড়া দুটো শিং) was published. Besides writing children's literature, he has planned and written programmes for television and radio. In 2016, he was appointed as the director of Bangladesh Shishu Academy for one year on a contractual basis. He succeeded Musharraf Hossain in this position.

== Awards ==
- Agrani Bank Children's Literature Award
- M Nurul Quader Children's Literature Award
- Kusum'r Sera Best Literary Award
- Futte Dew Ful Award
- Professor Mohammad Khaled Children's Literature Award
- Bangla Academy Literature Award for Children's Literature (2020)
