= Government Laboratory High School, Mymensingh =

- গভ. ল্যাবরেটরি হাই স্কুল, ময়মনসিংহ
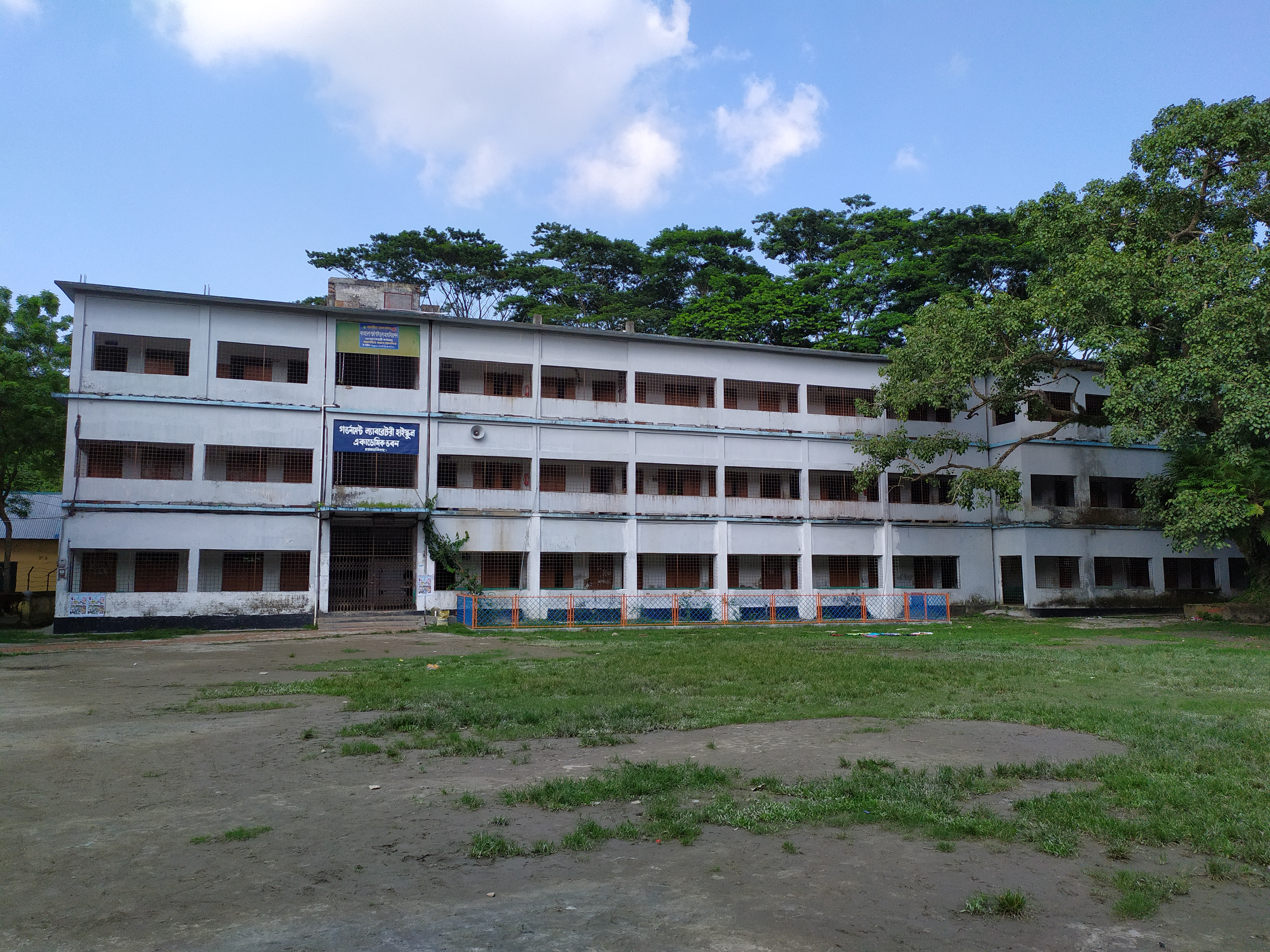
- Academic Building

Location
- Gonga Das Goha Road, Mymensingh City; Mymensingh 2200; Bangladesh; 24.7666°N 90.4018°E

Information
- Type: Government School
- Founded: 15 November 1948
- Status: Active
- School board: Board of Intermediate and Secondary Education, Mymensingh
- Session: January - December
- Acting headteacher: MD.Abdus Sabur
- Gender: Boys and girls
- Enrollment: About 1,600
- Classes: 1 - 10
- Education system: National Curriculum and Textbook Board
- Language: Bengali
- Area: 27.5 Acre
- Campus type: Non residential
- Board: Board of Intermediate and Secondary Education, Mymensingh

Government Laboratory High School, Mymensingh is a secondary school in Mymensingh City, Bangladesh. Its EIIN number is 111837. It was established on the bank of the old Brahmaputra River in the garden of Maharaja Surjya Kanta Acharjya.

== History ==
In 1879, Surya Kanta Acharjya of the Muktagacha zamindar family built a house known as Alexander Castle or Lohar Kuthir on 27.50 acres in Mymensingh. The house became the home of Teachers Training College and an "Experimental School" on 15 November 1948. On 24 December 1987 that "Experimental School" was converted to a high school named "Government Laboratory High School, Mymensingh."

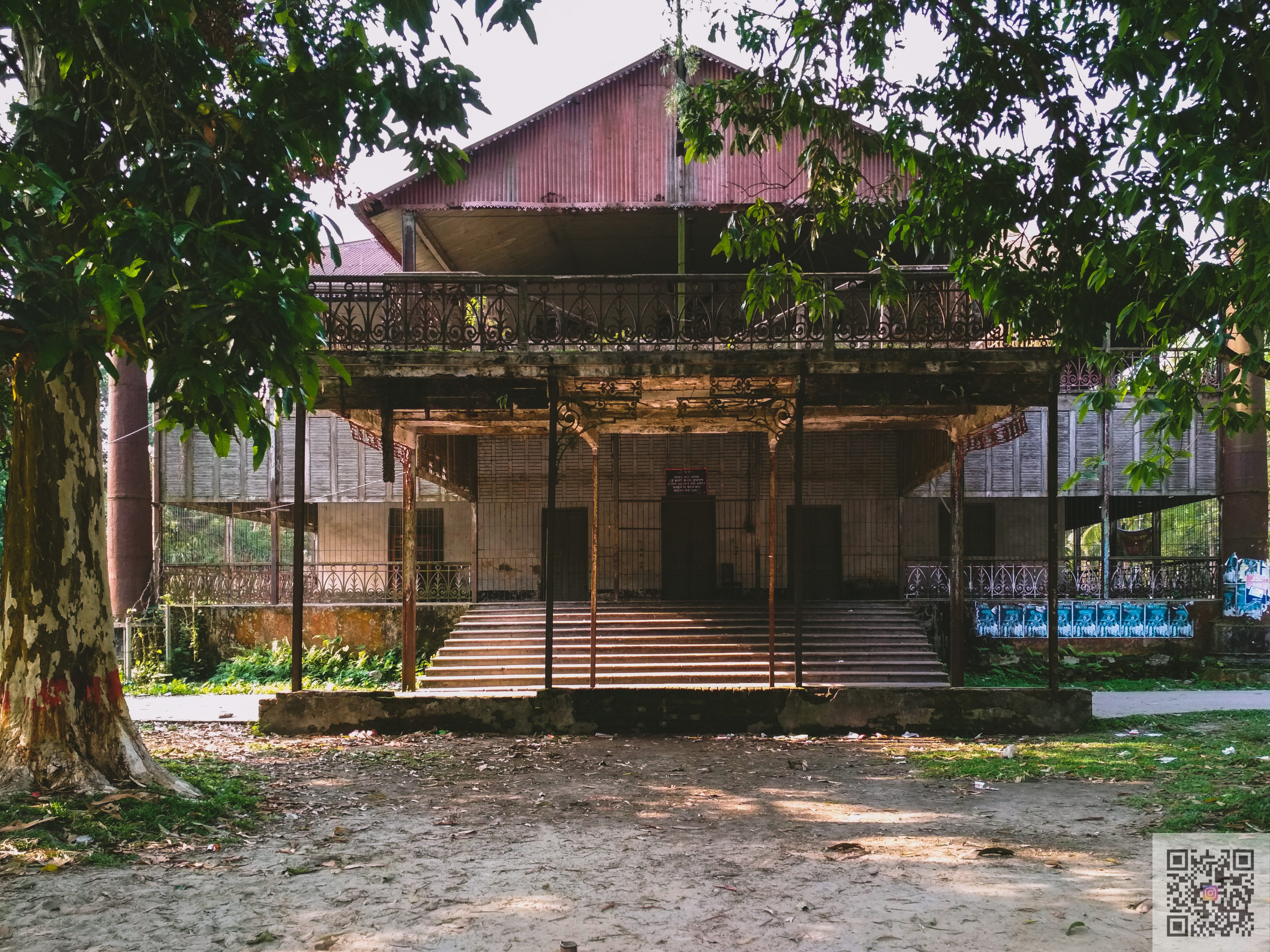
Alexandar Castle

== Admission ==
Each year one time in the Class III and Class VI are students allowed to participate admission test and then selected student get permitted for admission.But in 2017 it separated boys and girls in 2 section and held an admission for all classes for the next academic year.

== Education system ==
There are two shifts - morning and day. Morning shift is for Girls and the Day shift is for Boys. The school is open six days a week and closed one day. Thursday is a half class and Friday is a holiday.

== Uniform ==
Girls' uniform is sky blue colour salwar-kamij and frock. Boys' uniform is navy blue colour pant and white colour shirt.

== School magazine ==
The magazine of this school is not published regularly every year. There is also a magazine given to class 10 for their farewell named Smronika.

== Alumni association ==
There is an organization of the ex-students of the school named the Alumni Association of GLHS (AAGLHS). The aim of the organization is mainly to organize reunions amongst the ex-students of this school. Advertisements of AAGLHS's functions are published through the national dailies and its website www.mgovlab.edu.bd and Facebook pages.

== School day ==
The 'birthday' of the school is 15 November, which is celebrated as the 'school day'. Academic programs are cancelled and functions are organized in each of the sections. Students decorate their classes with balloons, posters, pictures, and colored paper, and they publish wall magazines containing their own stories and poems, which teachers and guardians come to admire. Students sometimes give invitation letters to their teachers to visit their room. Sometimes a birthday cake is cut celebrating the birthday of the school.

== Library ==
The library has approximately 2,500 books. Most of them were bought by coeval sanctioned money during the establishment of the school. Others were bought by annually approved money.

== Co-curricular activities ==
There are some clubs and organizations to help co-curricular activities: Bangladesh National Cadet Corps (BNCC), Scouting and Red Crescent. The notable clubs are Science Club of The Laboratorians (S.C.L), Cultural Club of the Laboratorians (C.C.L), English Club of the Laboratorians (E.C.L), Quiz Club of the Laboratorians (Q.C.L.), Debating Club of the Laboratorians (D.C.L.), Books Club of the Laboratorians (B.C.L) and History Club of the Laboratorians(H.C.L) etc.

== Results ==
The first examinees attended the Secondary School Certificate examination from this school in 1992. The highest success came in 1995. Almost every year in every public examination this school achieves the honor of 100% passing the students. They usually have good numbers and distinctions.
