= Sufia Khatun (writer) =

Bangladeshi writer (1922–2023)

- সুফিয়া খাতুন

Personal details
- Born: May 1922 Mymensingh
- Died: 7 January 2023 (aged 100) Dhaka
- Occupation: Author, social activist
- Awards: Bangla Academy Literary Award

Sufia Khatun (Bengali: সুফিয়া খাতুন) (May 1922 – 7 January 2023) was a Bangladeshi author and social activist. She won the Bangla Academy Literary Award in 2021.

== Biography ==
She was born in Mymensingh in May 1922.

She wrote an autobiography titled "Jibon Nodir Bake Bake" (Bengali: জীবন নদীর বাঁকে বাঁকে) which was published in 2005. In 2006, she wrote a children's book titled "Shona Jhora Din" (Bengali: সোনা ঝরা দিন). She wrote a book of poems titled "Apo Bhuvan" (Bengali: ওপো ভুবন).

In 2014, she published a book regarding her long life in exile, "Probasher Prapti" (Bengali: প্রবাসের প্রাপ্তি). In 2018, another book of poems was published by her titled "Narir Chokher Jol" (Bengali: নারীর চোখের জল).

She died on January 7, 2023.
