= Board of Intermediate and Secondary Education, Mymensingh =

Education board in Bangladedh

- মাধ্যমিক ও উচ্চ মাধ্যমিক শিক্ষা বোর্ড, ময়মনসিংহ
- Formation: 2017; 9 years ago
- Founder: Bangladesh Government
- Type: Education Board
- Headquarters: Mymensingh, Bangladesh
- Location(s): 42, Khagdahar Bazar; 346/2, Dholadia Road, Kathgola Bazar, Sadar, Mymensingh
- Region served: Mymensingh
- Official language: Bengali, English
- Chairman: Md. Shahidullah
- Parent organization: Ministry of Education
- Website: mymensingheducationboard.gov.bd

The Board of Intermediate and Secondary Education, Mymensingh is an autonomous organization that is responsible for holding public examinations (JSC, SSC, and HSC) in four districts of Mymensingh Division and for providing recognition to the newly established non-government educational institutions and also for the supervision, control and developments of those institutions. It started the operation in 2017.

== District under Mymensingh Education Board ==
- Mymensingh District
- Jamalpur District
- Netrokona District
- Sherpur District

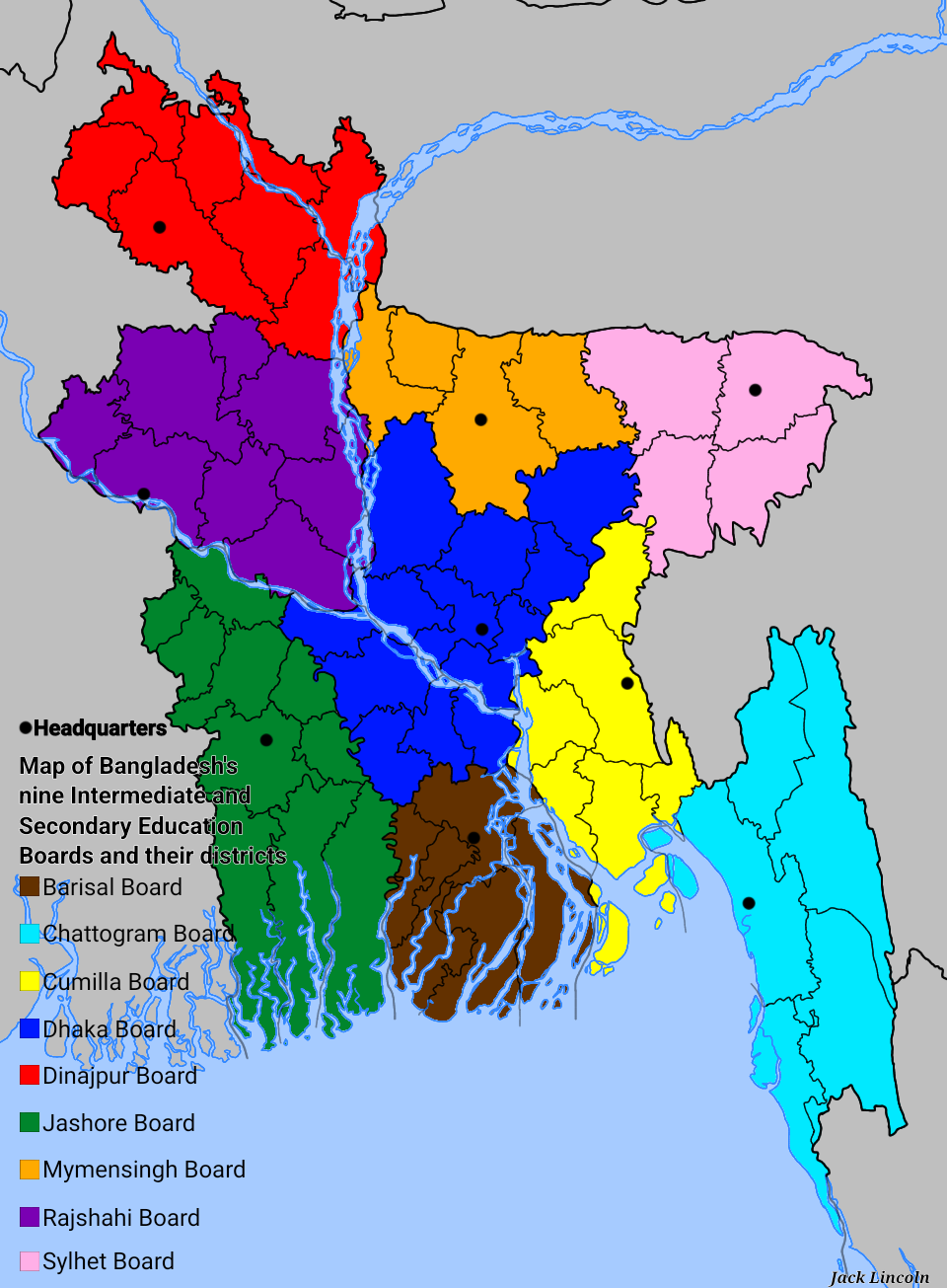
Map of Bangladesh's nine Intermediate and Secondary Education Boards and their districts

== See also ==
- List of Education Boards in Bangladesh
