= Bangla Academy Literary Award =

Literary award given by the namesake national language authority of Bangladesh

- Type: Civilian
- Country: Bangladesh
- Presented by: Bangla Academy
- Established: 1960
- First award: 1960
- Final award: 2023

The Bangla Academy Literary Award (Bengali: বাংলা একাডেমি সাহিত্য পুরস্কার; Bangla Academy Shahitya Puroshkar) is given by the Bangla Academy of Bangladesh in recognition of creative genius in advancement and overall contribution in the field of Bengali language and literature.

It was introduced in 1960 and recognized six categories: poetry, novels, short stories, essays, children's literature and translation. Beginning in 1985, two more awards were introduced to recognize overall contributions to Bengali language and literature.

At present, the Bangla Academy award is given in three fields:

- Poetry, novel, and short story
- Research, essay, and science
- Translation, drama, and juvenile literature

== Awards by decade ==
Following are lists of recipients of the award since 1960.

- List of Bangla Academy Literary Award recipients (1960–69)
- List of Bangla Academy Literary Award recipients (1970–79)
- List of Bangla Academy Literary Award recipients (1980–89)
- List of Bangla Academy Literary Award recipients (1990–99)
- List of Bangla Academy Literary Award recipients (2000–09)
- List of Bangla Academy Literary Award recipients (2010–19)
- List of Bangla Academy Literary Award recipients (2020-29)

== See also ==
- Ekushey Padak
- Ananda Purashkar
- Sahitya Akademi Award to Bengali Writers
- Rabindra Puraskar
