= Bharat Mihir =

Bharat Mihir was an Indian publishing company and newspaper which published in Bengal during the colonial British Raj. It had branches in Calcutta and Mymensingh (now in Bangladesh). It was banned by the 1878 Vernacular Press Act of the British government.
