= Mymensingh =

Metropolis and Capital city of Mymensingh Division, Bangladesh

Mymensingh ময়মনসিংহ (Bengali)
- Metropolis
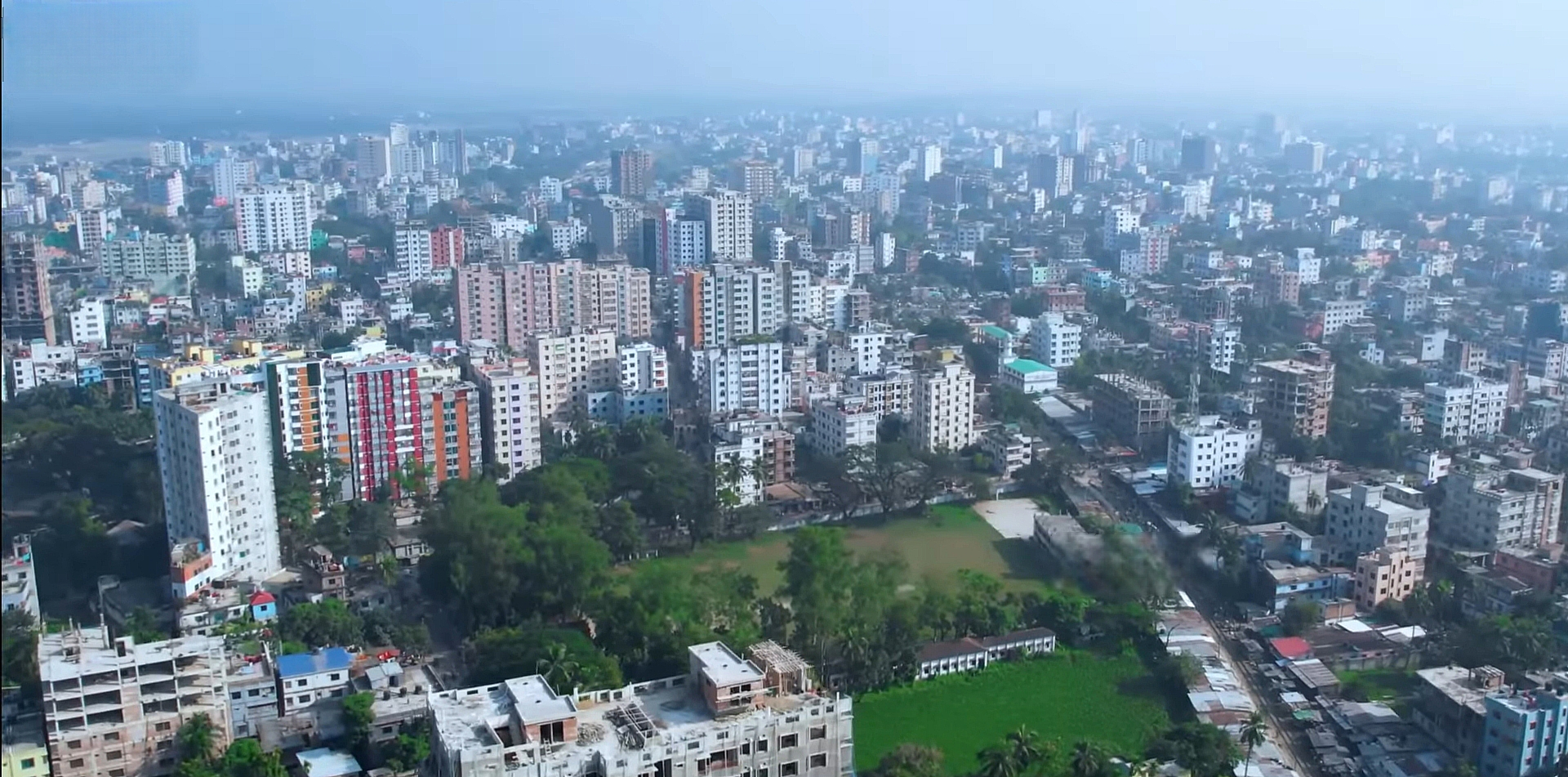
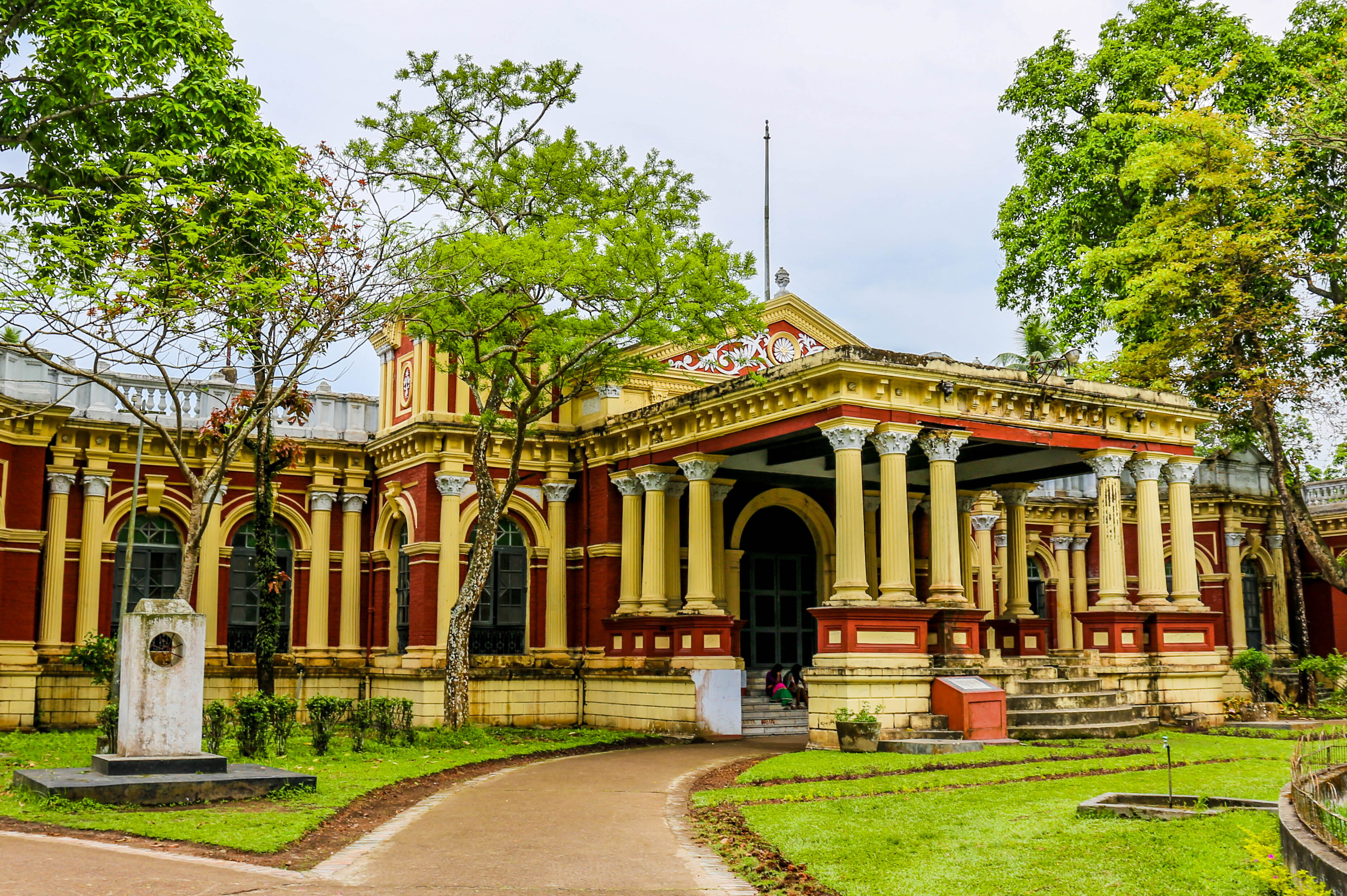
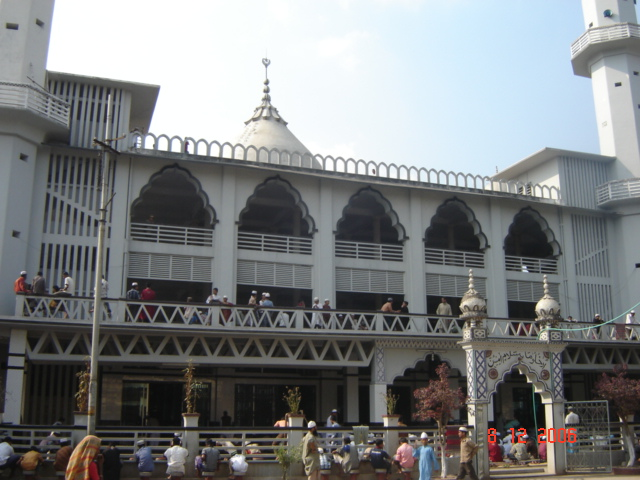
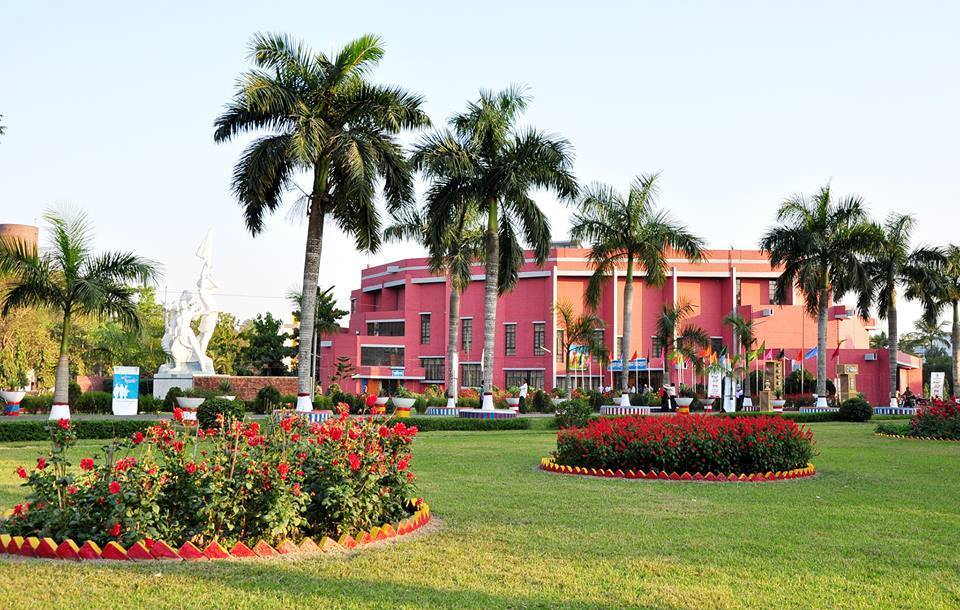
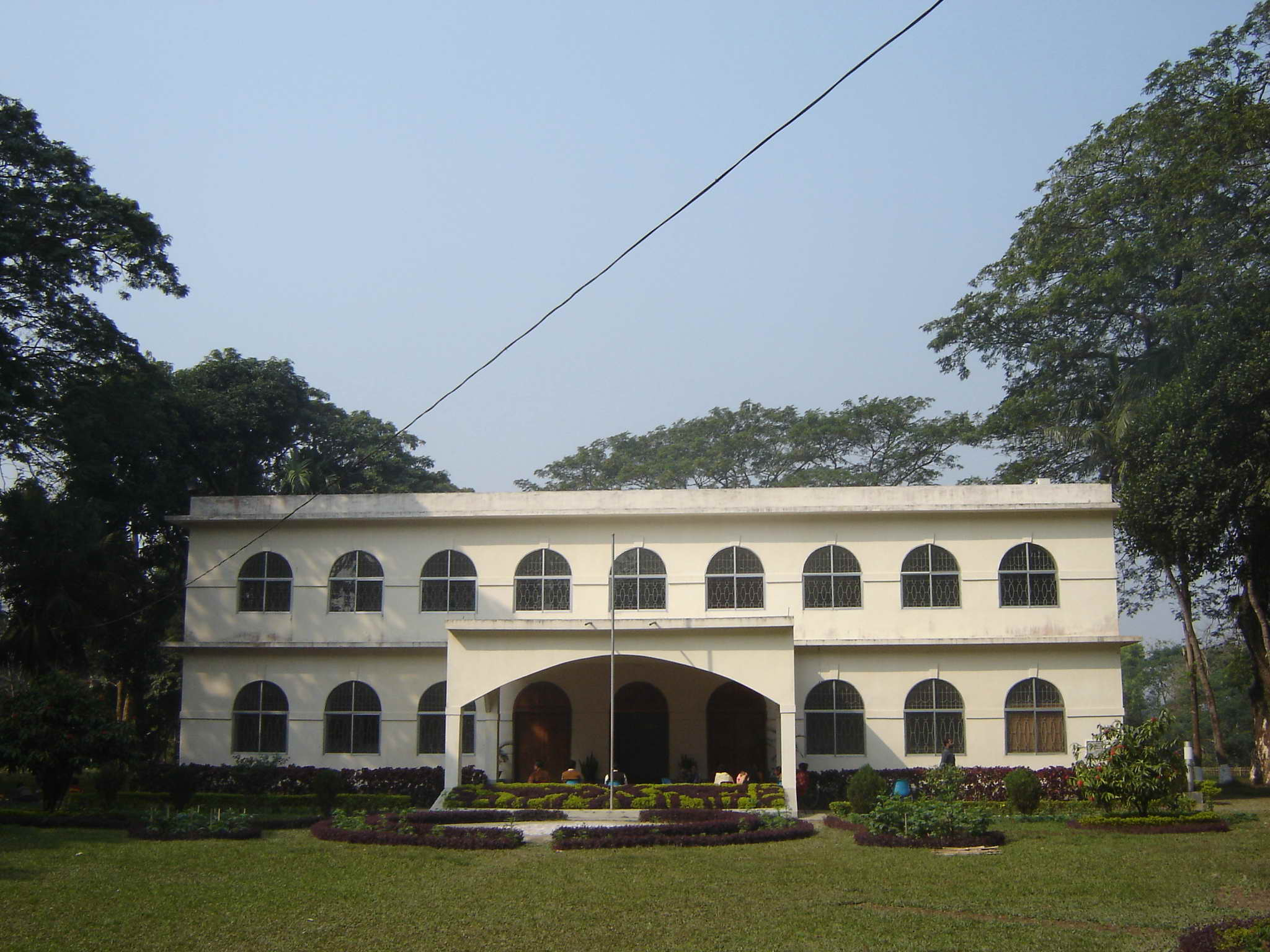
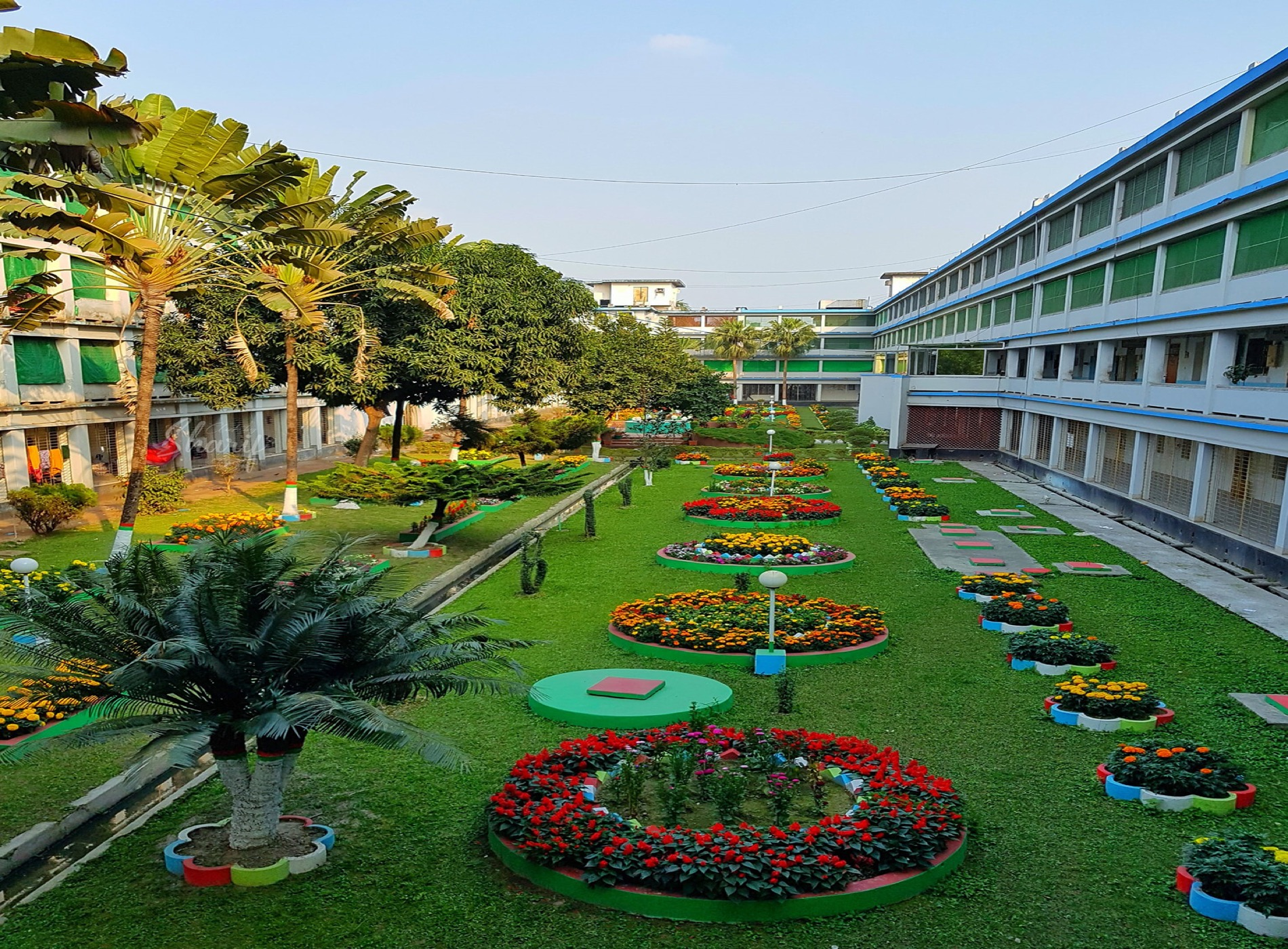
- Mymensingh City Skyline Shashi Lodge Boro Masjid Bangladesh Agricultural University Zainul Abedin Museum Mymensingh Medical College
- Nicknames: Momenshahi, Nasirabad, Education City
- Interactive map highlighting Mymensingh
- Location in Mymensingh Division Location in Bangladesh Location in Asia Location on Earth
- Coordinates: 24°45′14″N 90°24′11″E
- Country: Bangladesh
- Division: Mymensingh Division
- District: Mymensingh District
- Establishment: 1787
- Granted city status: 1787

Government
  - Type: Mayor–Council
  - Body: Mymensingh City Corporation
  - Administrator: Rukonuzzaman Rokon
  - City Council: 33 constituencies
  - Parliament: 1 constituencies

Area
  - Urban: 32.42 km^{2} (12.52 sq mi)
  - Metro: 95.34 km^{2} (36.81 sq mi)
- Elevation: 19 m (62 ft)

Population (2022)
  - City: 577,000
  - Rank: 7th in Bangladesh; 8th (Agglomeration)
  - Urban: 522,000
  - Urban density: 16,100/km^{2} (41,700/sq mi)
  - Metro: 663,000
  - Metro density: 6,950/km^{2} (18,000/sq mi)
- Demonym: Moymonshinga

Languages
  - Official: Bengali • English
  - Regional: Eastern Bengali dialects
- Time zone: UTC+6 (Bangladesh Time)
- Postal code: 2200, 2201, 2202, 2203, 2204, 2205, 2206, 2207, 2208
- Calling code: +880 91
- UN/LOCODE: BD MYM
- GDP (2022): PPP ▲$4.9 billion Nominal ▲$1.9 billion
- HDI (2022): 0.667 medium · 9th of 20
- Planning Authority: MCC Development Authority
- Water Supply and Sewerage Authority: MCC WASA
- Website: mcc.gov.bd

Mymensingh Municipality mahallah geocode map

Mymensingh (Bengali: ময়মনসিংহ, romanized: Maẏamanasinha, pronounced [mɔjmɔnʃiŋɦɔ]) is a metropolitan city and capital of Mymensingh Division, Bangladesh. Located on the bank of the Brahmaputra River, about 120 km (75 mi) north of the national capital Dhaka, it is a major financial center and educational hub of north-central Bangladesh. The population density of Mymensingh city is 44,458/km² (115,150/mi²), which makes it one of the most densely populated cities in Bangladesh. It is the administrative center of Mymensingh District and Mymensingh Division.

The city was constituted by the British East India Company on 1 May 1787. According to Ministry of Public Administration, Mymensingh is ranked 4th in district status. Mymensingh attracts 25 percent of all the health tourists visiting Bangladesh due to quality healthcare. Mymensingh elevation is over 19 m above sea level, the highest of Bangladesh's major cities. Mymensingh is located near Tura, a city in Meghalaya, accessible through the Gobrakura Land Port.

The city is associated with the Old Brahmaputra river, the traditional embroidered quilt called Nakshikantha (Bengali: নকশীকাঁথা), and the rural ballad collection Maimansingha Gitika. The cadet college established in Tangail in 1963 was called Momenshahi Cadet College. The city is well-known for educational institutions.

== History ==
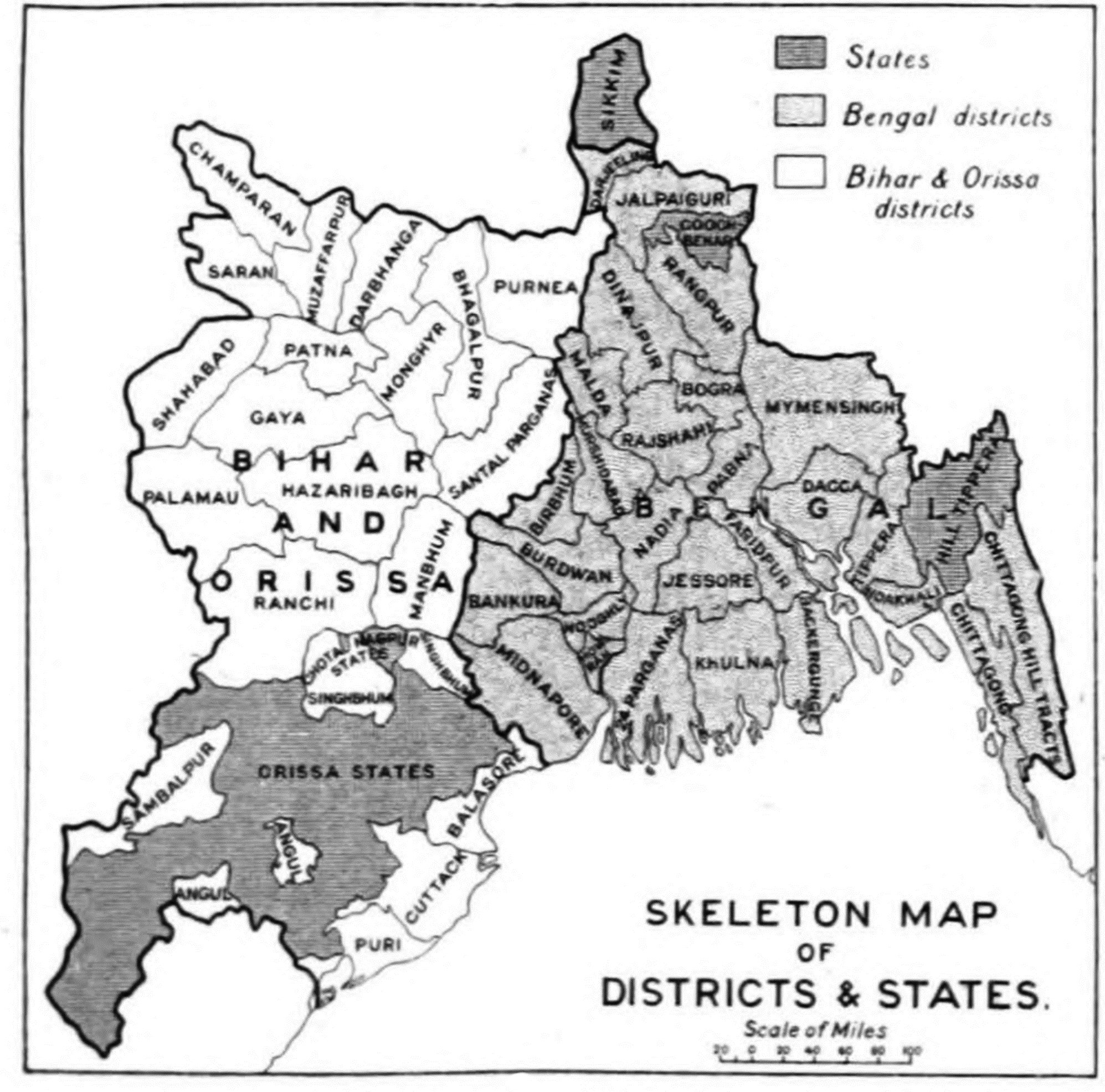
Provincial map of Bengal showing Greater Mymensingh Area (present Mymensingh Division with Tangail and Kishoreganj) in 1917

Mymensingh is one of the sixteen old districts of Bangladesh which was constituted by the British East India Company on 1 May 1787. Being more than 220 years old, Mymensingh has a rich cultural and political history. In the beginning, Begunbari was chosen as the headquarters of the district. However, the district headquarters was relocated to Mymensingh when Begunbari devastated by a flash flood. Earlier Mymensingh was called Nasirabad, after Nasiruddin Nasrat Shah. During the British Raj, this district was ruled by Talukdar Zamindars and most of the inhabitants of the town were Hindus, forming 78% of the population in the last census before Partition. However, many Hindu families, including the Talukdar Zamindars left Bangladesh during Partition in 1947. A second spell of exodus took place following the Indo-Pak war of 1965. Many people born and raised Mymensingh have left for West Bengal since the 1960s. The exodus continues albeit at a slower pace.

Muslims began migrating into the town beginning from the early 20th century. The Vidyamoyee Uccha Balika Bidyalaya and Muminunnesa Women's College have played a great role in educating Bengali Muslim women. A majority of first-generation successful Bangladeshi women have attended these schools and colleges, including the first woman justice of the High Court of Bangladesh, Justice Nazmun Ara Sultana. On 1 December 1969, Tangail subdivision was separated from Mymensingh, and District of Tangail was officially formed. Similarly, in 1977, the new district of Jamalpur (including Sherpur) were formed.

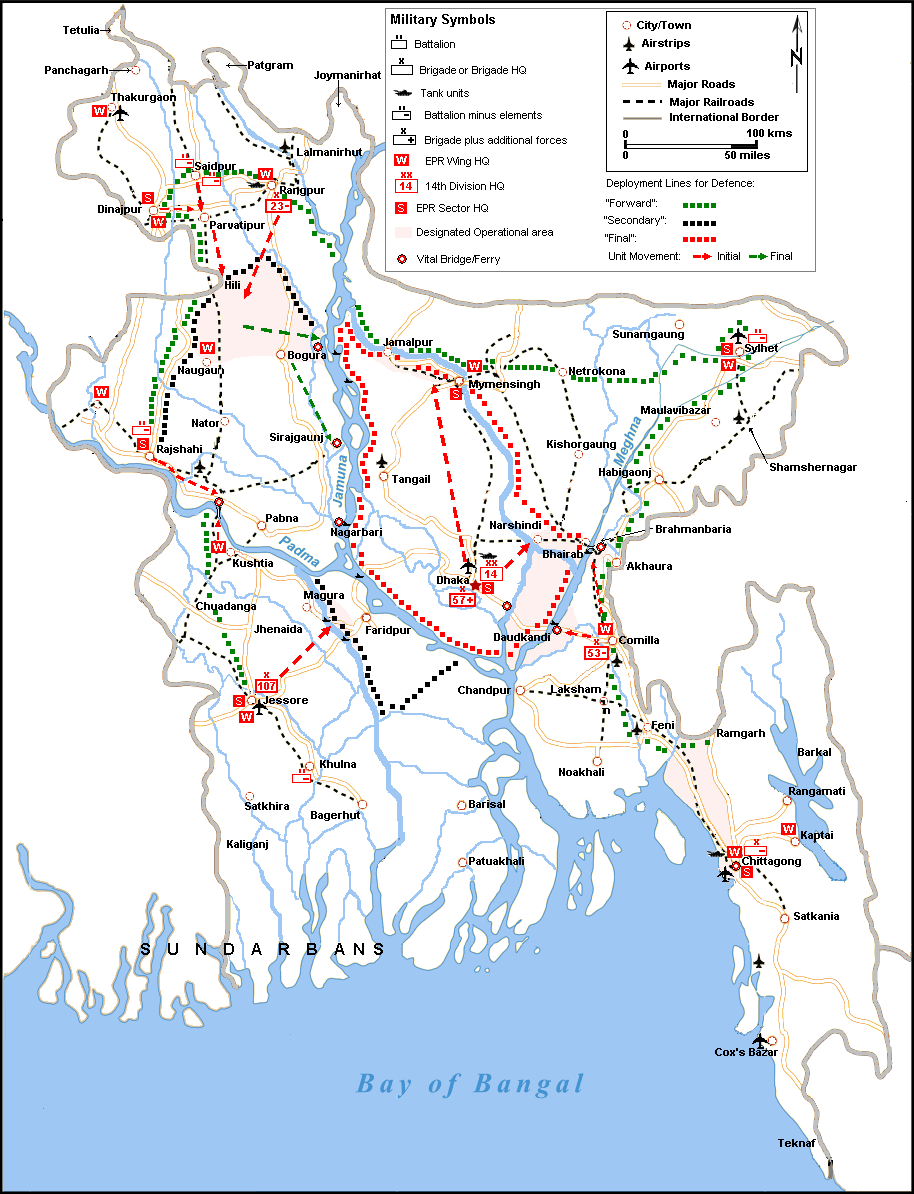
Pakistani Eastern Command plan for the defence of East Pakistan from 1967 to 1971 (generic representation—some unit locations not shown).

The nine-month liberation war of Bangladesh began on March 27, 1971. Mymensingh remained free from the occupation army until April 23, 1971. The Pakistani occupation forces deserted Mymensingh on December 10, and the Mukti Bahini resistance group took over on December 11, just five days ahead of the victory of Dhaka on December 16.

== Geography and climate ==
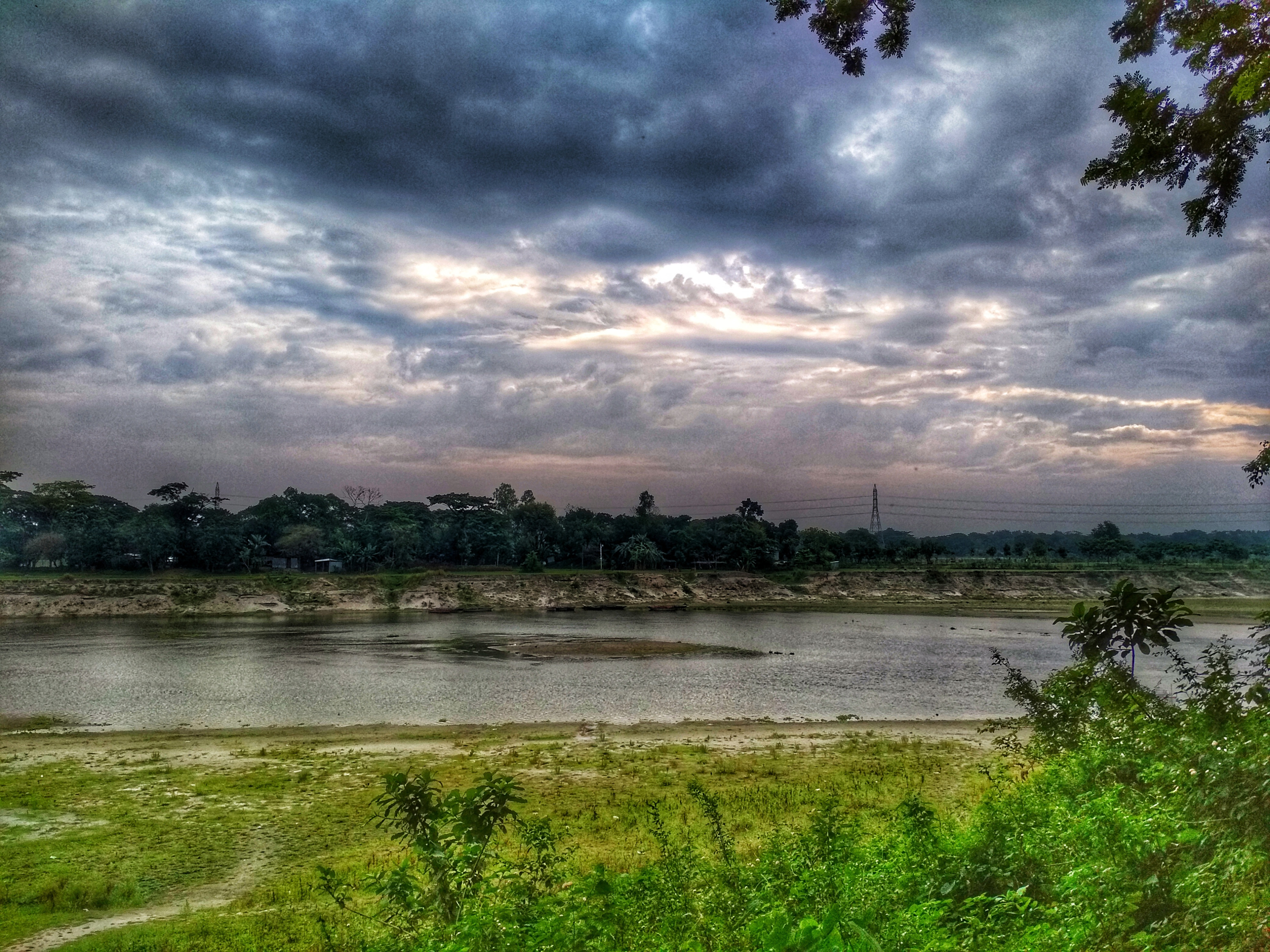
Cloudy sky over Brahmaputra River

The city has no officially defined geographical limits. Since the 1980s the city has expanded with fast urbanisation. Mymensingh city is clearly marked by the Old Brahmaputra River flowing along its north. Shambhuganj is situated on the other side of the Brahmaputra, connected by the Shambhuganj Bridge District. Other ends of the city are marked respectively by the beginning of the Bangladesh Agricultural University campus, the Mymensingh Medical College, Army cantonment and, finally, Sultanabad, a township built for the followers of Aga Khan. A railway line connecting Dhaka with northern districts, built between 1885 and 1899, passes through the city and divides it into two sides.

The climate of Mymensingh is slightly colder than Dhaka, as it is closer to the Himalayas, and sufficient to be a monsoon-influenced humid subtropical climate (Köppen Cwa) instead of a tropical savanna or tropical monsoon climate as found further south in Bangladesh. The monsoon starts in May or June and continues until August. It rains heavily and sometimes for days and weeks. During the monsoon, the temperature varies between 25 and 31 °C (77.0 and 87.8 °F). The temperature falls below 15 °C (59 °F) in winter which is spread over December and January and may well include November and February. The highest temperature is felt during April–May period, where it may reach as high as 40 °C (104 °F). High humidity causes heavy sweating during this period. For western travellers, the best time to visit is between November and February.

Climate data for Mymensingh (1991–2020 normals, extremes 1883–present)
Month	Jan	Feb	Mar	Apr	May	Jun	Jul	Aug	Sep	Oct	Nov	Dec	Year
Record high °C (°F)	32.3 (90.1)	35.5 (95.9)	41.1 (106.0)	43.3 (109.9)	42.8 (109.0)	41.0 (105.8)	41.6 (106.9)	40.2 (104.4)	38.2 (100.8)	37.6 (99.7)	34.8 (94.6)	31.0 (87.8)	43.3 (109.9)
Mean daily maximum °C (°F)	24.0 (75.2)	27.0 (80.6)	30.5 (86.9)	31.7 (89.1)	31.8 (89.2)	31.7 (89.1)	31.5 (88.7)	31.9 (89.4)	31.7 (89.1)	31.5 (88.7)	29.5 (85.1)	25.8 (78.4)	29.9 (85.8)
Daily mean °C (°F)	17.3 (63.1)	20.6 (69.1)	24.4 (75.9)	26.7 (80.1)	27.6 (81.7)	28.4 (83.1)	28.5 (83.3)	28.8 (83.8)	28.3 (82.9)	26.9 (80.4)	23.0 (73.4)	18.9 (66.0)	24.9 (76.8)
Mean daily minimum °C (°F)	11.8 (53.2)	15.0 (59.0)	19.0 (66.2)	22.2 (72.0)	23.8 (74.8)	25.7 (78.3)	26.2 (79.2)	26.4 (79.5)	25.8 (78.4)	23.4 (74.1)	18.0 (64.4)	13.6 (56.5)	20.9 (69.6)
Record low °C (°F)	4.2 (39.6)	4.5 (40.1)	8.9 (48.0)	11.2 (52.2)	15.2 (59.4)	19.4 (66.9)	22.8 (73.0)	20.8 (69.4)	20.8 (69.4)	17.8 (64.0)	8.3 (46.9)	3.8 (38.8)	3.8 (38.8)
Average precipitation mm (inches)	8 (0.3)	16 (0.6)	38 (1.5)	141 (5.6)	312 (12.3)	410 (16.1)	423 (16.7)	329 (13.0)	305 (12.0)	192 (7.6)	14 (0.6)	7 (0.3)	2,195 (86.6)
Average precipitation days (≥ 1 mm)	1	2	4	9	15	20	23	21	18	8	1	1	123
Average relative humidity (%)	77	72	71	77	81	86	87	86	86	83	79	79	80
Mean monthly sunshine hours	183.0	202.2	216.2	203.0	187.3	133.7	138.7	151.8	148.9	209.9	224.1	200.0	2,198.8
Source 1: NOAA
Source 2: Bangladesh Meteorological Department (humidity 1981-2010)

== Administration ==
Mymensingh is the headquarters of one of the eight administrative divisions of Bangladesh. Divisional Commissioner, who is the administrative chief of Mymensingh Division, DIG for Mymensingh division and other divisional civil servants have their offices in the city, which functions as part of the government administrative setup. Deputy Commissioner (DC), who is the administrative chief of Mymensingh District, Civil Surgeon and other district level civil servants also have their offices in the city.

One mayor and ward commissioners are elected for five-year terms by direct votes. Mymensingh City Corporation is responsible for all the administrative work related to city governance.

== Demographics ==
Historical population
Year	Pop.	±%
1991	188,713	—
2001	227,201	+20.4%
2011	258,040	+13.6%
2022	577,000	+123.6%
sources:citypopulation.de

Religions in Myemsingh City Corp. (2022)
Religion	Percent
Islam	90.80%
Hinduism	8.79%
Other or not stated	0.41%

As of the 2022 census, Mymensingh City Corporation had 135,495 households and a population of 577,000. 16.65% of the population was under 10 years of age. Mymensingh had a literacy rate of 84.41% for those 7 years and older and a sex ratio of 103.61 males per 100 females.

== Economy ==
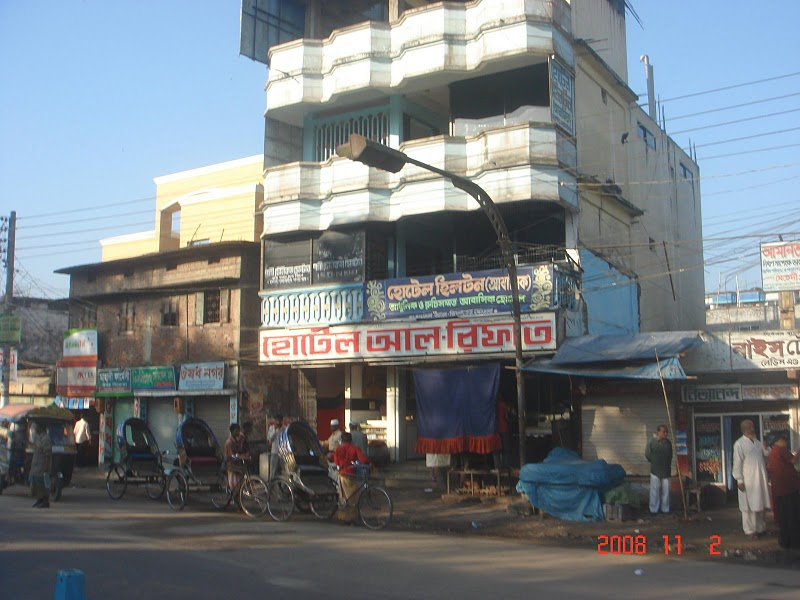
Hotel Al-Rifat in Chorpara Mymensingh

Historically, Mymensingh district was known for jute production which was termed 'golden fibre' due to the revenue it generated as a cash crop. Due to the high demand for polythene bags and other economic reasons, the jute industry has significantly declined. As Mymensingh is the capital of Mymensingh Division, government employees make up a large percentage of the city's workforce. Mymensingh also has a large unskilled and semi-skilled labour population, who primarily earn their livelihood as hawkers, Rickshaw pullers, taxi drivers, mechanics and other such professions. Agriculture is the most important sector contributing to GDP, followed by the growing service sector in the city. The increasing demand for fish in the local and global markets has generated a new opportunity for local fishermen as well as businessmen to exploit fishing in Mymensingh, and today it is very important to the economy. Much of the population have modified their paddy fields to become ponds and are cultivating fish. Prawns, sometimes reaching a very large size in the winter, are sold in Mymensingh in great numbers.

The entire area between Durgabari Road, and Maharaja Road comprises the traditional shopping area. There are places like Ganginarpar, Boro Bazaar, Choto Bazaar, Mechua Bazaar within this area. There are spots like Jilapi Patty which is for making and selling jilapi. The main road from Notunbazar to the railway station & C.K. Ghosh Road to Charpara hosts a number of shops for manufactured products and clothing.

=== City centre ===
The city centre of Mymensingh is along the Ganginarpar Road, which is known as the vein or life line of Mymensingh city. Some more busy area of the city are Chorpara Moor, Town Hall Moor, Zero Point Moor & Bridge Moor.

== Cuisine ==
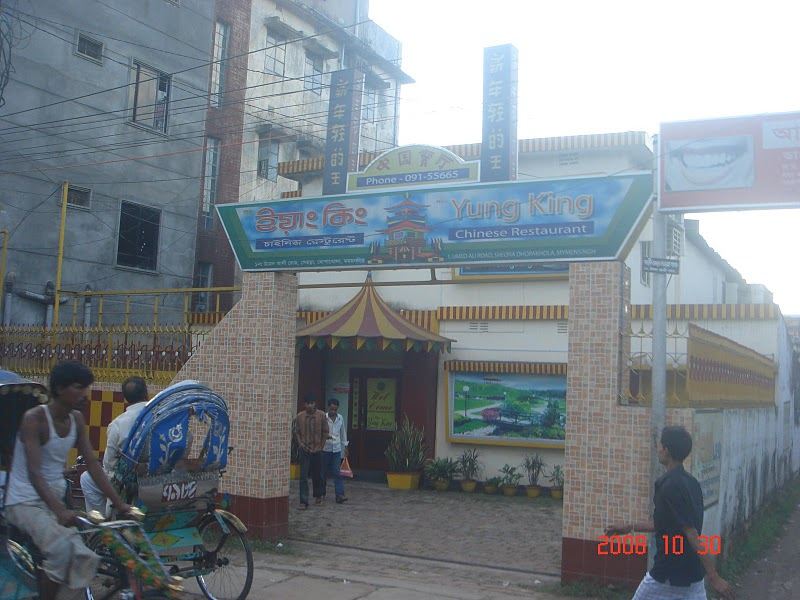
Chinese restaurant in Mymensingh

The staple food is plain rice with a curry of fish or meat. Normally people start with fried or steamed vegetable and dal, a kind of lentil soup. Often people squeeze a citron slice or take additional salt while eating and add fresh shallots and green pepper as seasoning. Traditional snacks and savouries include seasonal pitha of various kinds, dal-puri, and shingara. Home made desserts include Khyr, Payesh and Shemai. Sweets soaked in syrup of sugar, such as Jilapi, are mostly bought from shops. Pan, a digestive made out of betel nuts, spices, tobacco, and certain other ingredients are eaten by many people, some of which consume it with aromatic Dzorda. For dinner or lunch, a simple formula is to prepare "khichuri", the broth of rice and lentils, seasoned with spices, and served with chutney or pickles. Ghee (butter) may be spread just before eating. The meal may end with sweet curd. Muri (puffed rice), chira (flattened rice) and khoi (popped rice) are substitutes for rice. They are eaten with gur (jaggery) which is a kind of unrefined sugar. They may be mixed with yogurt or milk before eaten. People use only the right hand for eating.

== Landmarks ==
The Old Town Hall, built by Maharaja Surya Kanta Acharyya had hosted thousands of drama, meeting and cultural functions since 1878. It was demolished in 2006 and is being rebuilt by the Mymensingh Pourashava.

Shashi Lodge is one of the historical place inside the city. It was built in 1905.

Bangladesh Parishad, situated at Chhoto Bazar Road, the regional centre of Pakistan Council in Mymensingh, set up in 1969, came to be known as Bangladesh Parishad after establishment of Bangladesh in 1971. It was a government institution under the Ministry of Information and housed a public library with a collection of books and magazines. The library has 35,656 volumes on all subjects. It also had a hall to hold literary and cultural functions. Till the 1980s, Bangladesh Parishad was a hub of cultural activity of post-liberation Mymensingh. It was most active in the late 1970s when Ashraf Ali Khan was its chief executive.

Shishu Academy was set up under the initiative of president Ziaur Rahman in 1980. Its Mymensingh office was opened in the 1990s.

The first Shahid Minar was built in 1958 on crossing of the Amrita Babu Road, close to Mymensingh Pourashava. It was relocated to the Town Hall premises in the mid-1990s.

Amarabati Natya Mandir was the first theatre built in the heart of Mymensingh town in the 1930s. Later it was converted into a cinema named Chayabani. The Town Hall became the sole venue for staging a play or drama. Bahubrihi is one of the drama circles that has played a key role in sustaining the drama movement in Mymensingh since the 1970s. Singing was part of daily life for most people since the 19th century. Mithun Dey and Sunil Dhar were two local music teachers since the 1960s. Sunil Dhar established a music school at Atharo Bari Building in the 1980s. Folk Ballads: Maimansingha Gitika. There are three cinema halls in Mymensingh town. Most of these halls are very old but still in operation. Cable TV connectivity was launched in 1999 and together with DVD and VCR, most people now prefer home entertainment With Dish Cable Line. However, on special occasions such as Eid, new year, Puja, and other vacations, people still watch movies in the cinema halls. Aloka was the oldest cinema hall, which was demolished in 2006 to make a modern shopping and residential complex. Other cinema halls are Chayabani, Purabi and Shena-Auditorium (closed).

Muslim Institute library is a public library which was established in 1934. The Bangladesh Parishad library has died down since the 1980s. The local Bar also has a library of its own rich in legal books and journals.

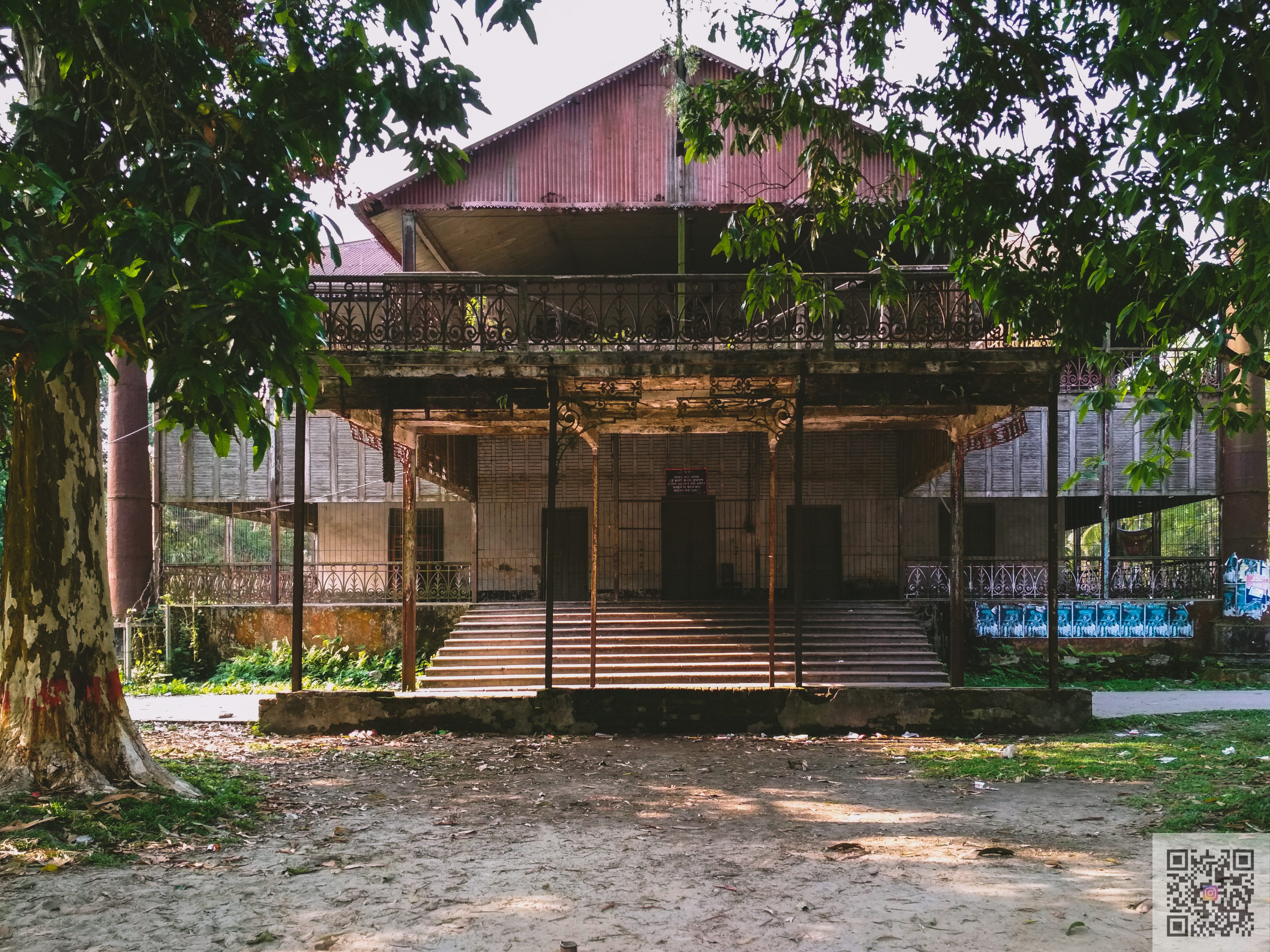
Alexander Castle

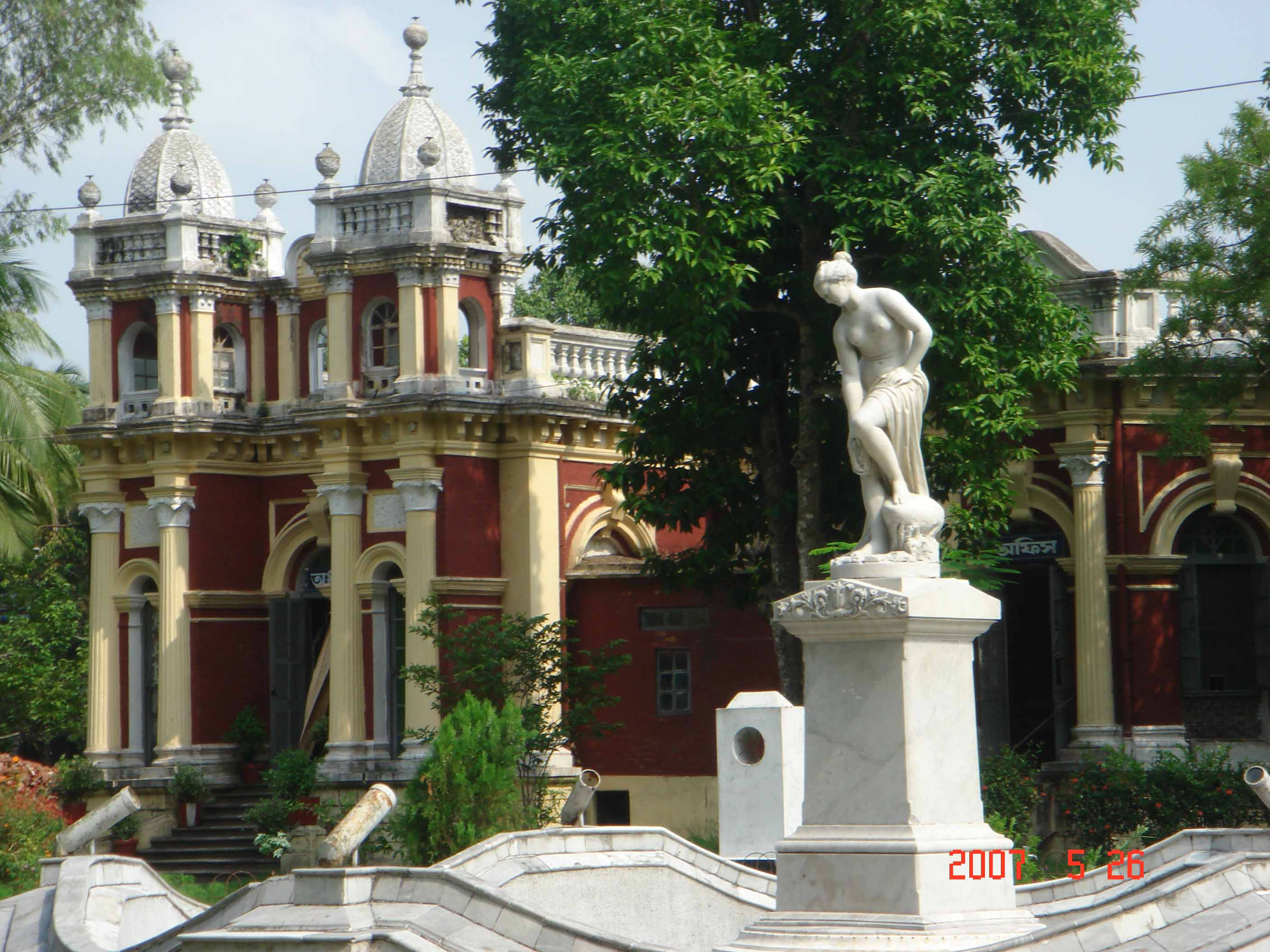
Sculpture in Soshi Lodge

The "Alexander Castle" or "Lohar Kutir" as it is locally known, is where Maharaja Surya Kanta Acharya invited Grand Duke Boris of Russia and General Sir George White, and built it for his stay and a same Russian styled also built by the Ponni of Tangail. Rabindranath Tagore also was in Alexandra castle for participating a citizen gathering. This earthquake-proof steel and timber building was built after his much vaunted "Crystal Palace" or "Rang Mahal" as it was locally known, was destroyed by the Great Bengal Earthquake of 12 June 1897. Subsequently, "Shashi Lodge" or "Mymensingh Palace" was built at the site of "Rang Mahal". However Maharaja Surya Kanta died before "Soshi Lodge" could be completed. It was completed by Maharaja Soshi Kanta Acharyya. Both the buildings had once contained innumerable works of art, artefacts, sculptures and antiques collected from all over the world. Both these buildings have been declared as National Heritage Monuments. But unplanned development already damaged the scenario of rare Russian architecture in this country.

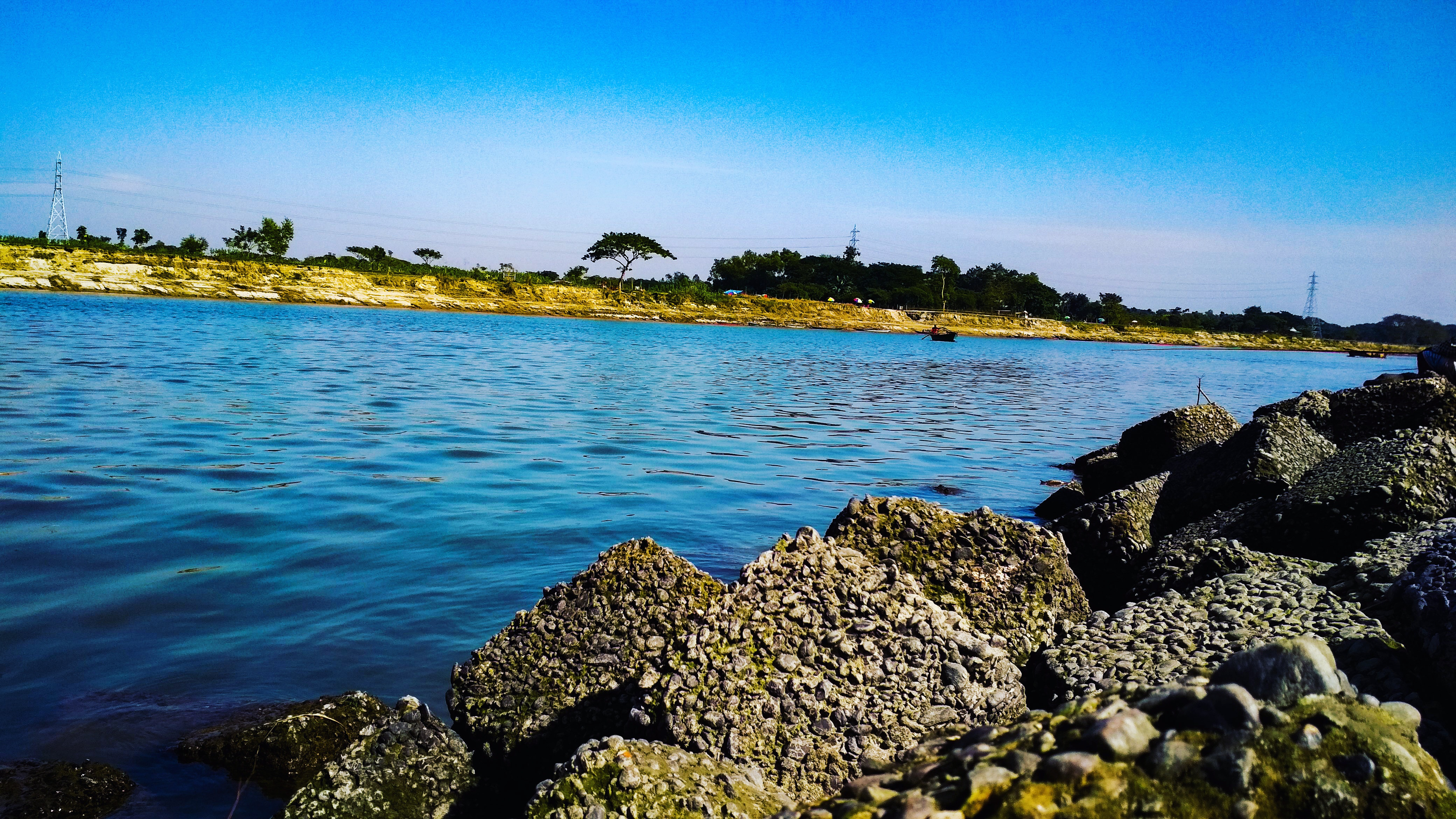
Brahmaputra River

Bipin Park is a small park near Boro Bazaar right on the Brahmaputra River.

=== Museums ===
The Mymensingh Museum was established in 1969. Though its collection comes from the palaces of zamindars of the greater Mymensingh region, it lacks proper preservation.

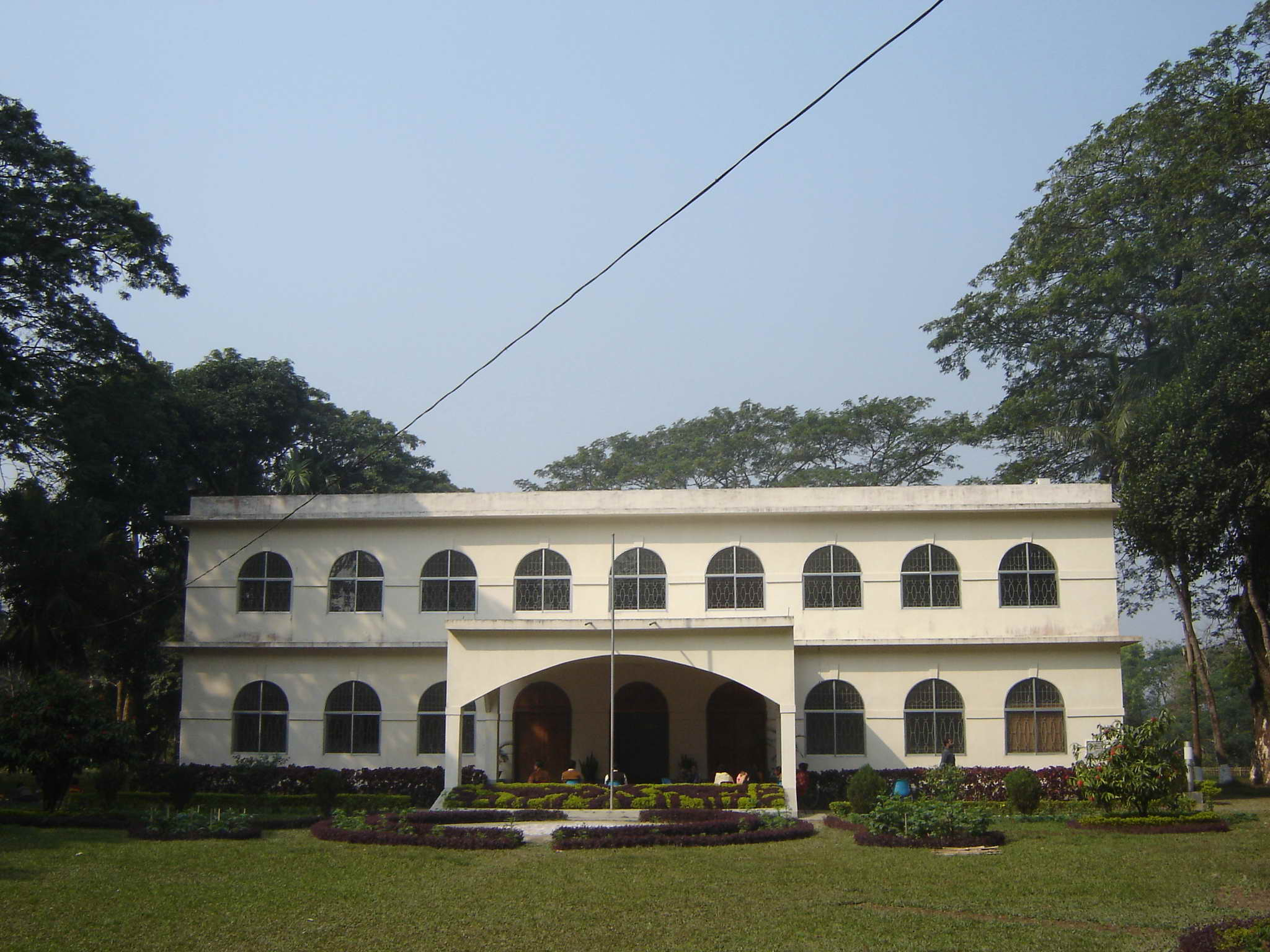
Zainul Abedin Art Gallery

The Zainul Abedin Museum was established in a house on the Brahmaputra River in 1975. The art gallery includes the paintings of Zainul Abedin, a pioneer of the country's modern art movement, as well as an art school, art cottage, and open-air stage.

The Fish Museum & Biodiversity Center, also known as FMBC, is operated by Bangladesh Agricultural University.

=== Religious buildings ===
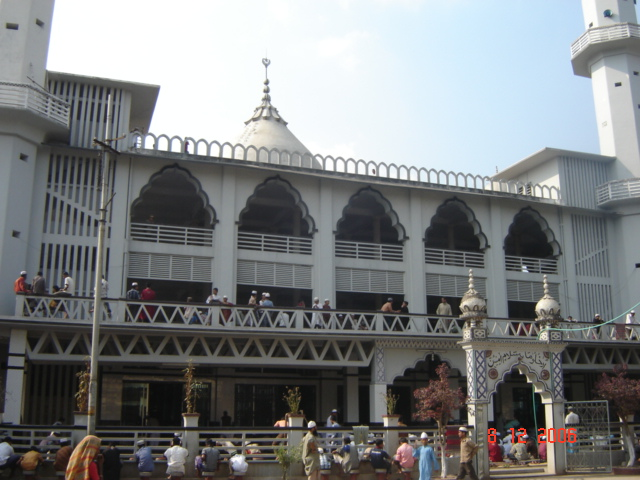
The Boro Masjid

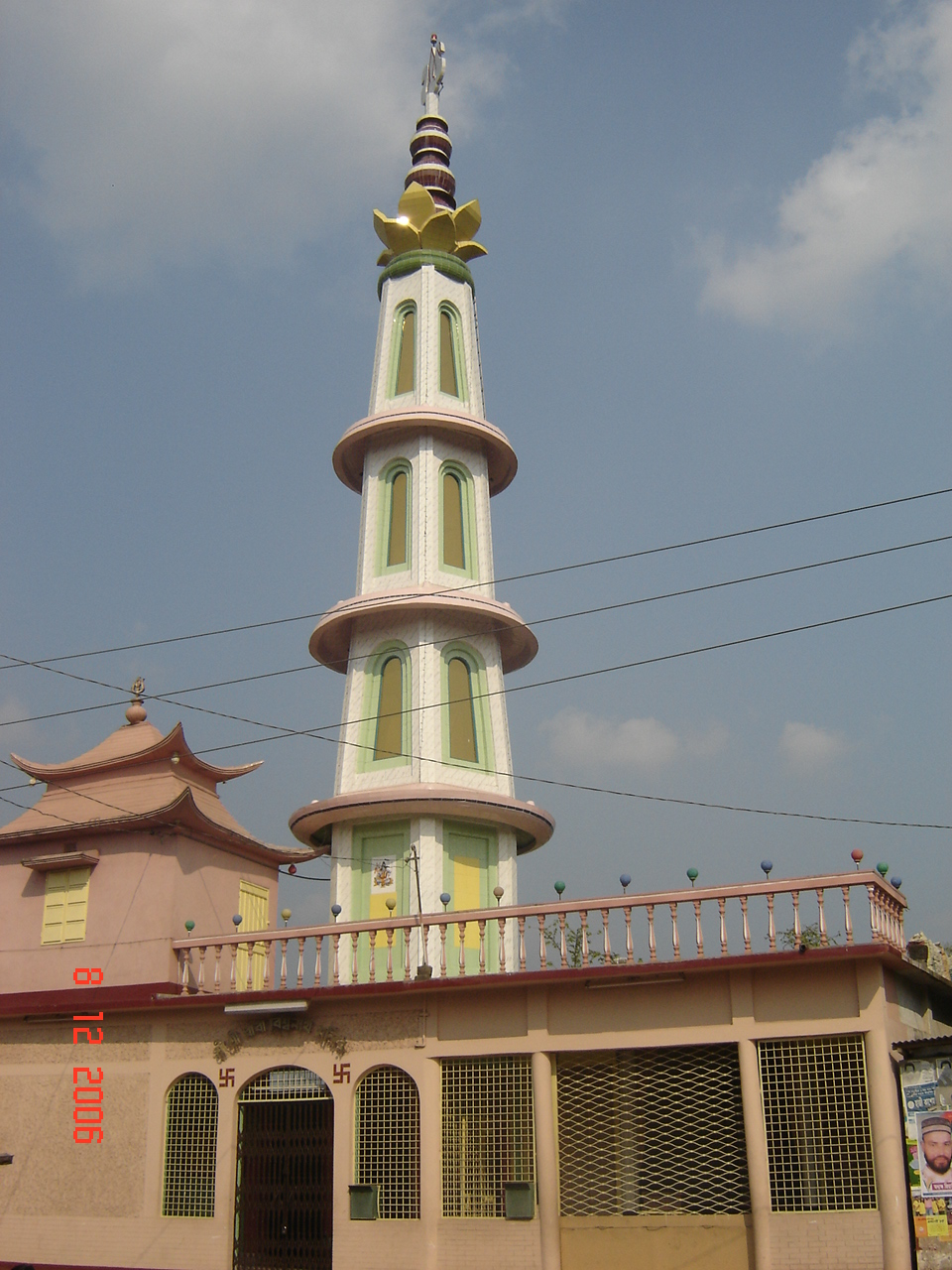
Bishyanath Temple

==== Anjuman Eid-gah Maidan ====
Under the auspices of the governor of East Pakistan Abdul Monem Khan, the Anjuman Eid-gah Maidan prayer ground was established in 1962 on 27 acres (11 ha) of land, including a pond. Every year congregation of Eid ul-Fitr and Eid ul-Adha are held here in the morning. The prayer ground is walled on sides with coconut trees growing. This place was used to accommodate the Elephants of Maharaj Surya Kanta Acharya in colonial time.

=== Durga Bari Temple ===
Durga Bari Temple is one of the main religious centres for the Hindus living in Mymensingh. It is situated in the Durga Bari Road. Hindu Goddess Durga Devi is worshipped here. Kirtan is recited in the temple throughout the week.

=== Ramakrishna Math and Mission ===
Ramakrishna Ashrama of Mymensingh is situated at 182, Ramakrishna Mission Road. Ramakrishna Math is a monastic organisation for men brought into existence by Sri Ramakrishna.

=== St Patrick's Cathedral Church ===
The Roman Catholic Diocese of Mymensingh is a diocese located in the city of Mymensingh in the Ecclesiastical province of Dhaka in Bangladesh. Bishop Ponen Paul Kubi, CSC, DD is head of the Diocese of Mymensingh. Most of the people in this diocese are from Garo tribal community. Bishop is also a Garo tribal. A total of 76,047 Catholics and 6665 Protestant Christians live here. People are employed as farmers and day labourers in rural areas, and many people live in cities as migrant workers.

=== Mymensingh Baptist Church ===
The Mymensingh Baptist Church is located near to the town hall.

== Sports ==
The Mymensingh Sports Association (MSA) was established in 1901. The association was headed by the then District Magistrate of Mymensingh as its president. Shri Romonikanta Chowdhury served as the general secretary, while Maharaja Shoshikanta Acharya Chowdhury was a member of the association. In 1956, the organization was reorganized and renamed the Mymensingh District Sports Association (MDSA).

Mymensingh has a rich football history, hosting two of Bengal's oldest tournaments, the Surya Kanta Shield and Lila Devi Shield, both established in 1914. Sponsored by Surya Kanta Aacherjee of the Muktagacha dynasty, the Lila Devi Shield, named after his wife, was played at the District School Ground and popular among school-goers, while the Surya Kanta Shield, held at Circuit House Park, welcomed clubs from Karachi and Calcutta. Initially managed by the Mymensingh Sporting Association (1914–1919), the tournaments were later conducted by Mymensingh District School from 1920, after which both became irregular. The Taj Mahal Shield, Surendra Sarojini Shield and Thompson Cup, were also popular football tournaments in the region.

Mymensingh also has the country's oldest sports club (alongside Wari Club Dhaka), Mymensingh Mohammedan Sporting Club, established in 1898. Other notable clubs include Friends Eleven Club, founded in 1901, and Panditpara A.C., founded in 1910. Notable footballers to have come out of the district include Illias Uddin Ahmed, Motahar Ali Khan, Pakhi Sen, Taslimuddin Ahmed, Rakhal Majumdar, Upen Roy, Hassan Al-Mamun, and Abdul Halim to name a few.

In 1937, when Islington Corinthians toured India and participated in two exhibition matches against Dhaka Sporting Association (DSA) in Dhaka, the majority of the DSA XI hailed from Mymensingh, most notable among them being Pakhi Sen (Bhupendramohon Sengupta), who scored the winning goal for DSA in the first match. The English club also played an exhibition match against the Mymensingh Sporting Association on 23 November, winning 0–6. In 1951, when the first inter-district football tournament was established in Eastern Bengal, Mymensingh District won two of the first three editions.

The "Panditparar Math" is a vast field on the bank of the Brahmaputra, in front of the Circuit House, which is used by the sports persons of the city. It has produced many notable cricket players like Probir Sen, one of the few wicket keepers to stump Don Bradman and Hemanga Bose. The former vice captain of Bangladesh national cricket team, Mahmudullah was born in this district and he served Bangladesh cricket team proudly.

Body building has become a favourite pastime for many of the young adults of the town. The Muslim Institute has a well equipped gymnasium since the 1950s. Physician Abdul Halim was a renowned bodybuilder in the 1960s who became Mr. East Pakistan in a nationwide competition. Farhad Ahmed Kanchon, who later became a Member of the Parliament in the late 1970s, was also a regular. The multipurpose Rafiq Uddin Bhuiyan Stadium, located near Police Lines Road in the district, serves as the main sports venue in Mymensingh.

== Education ==
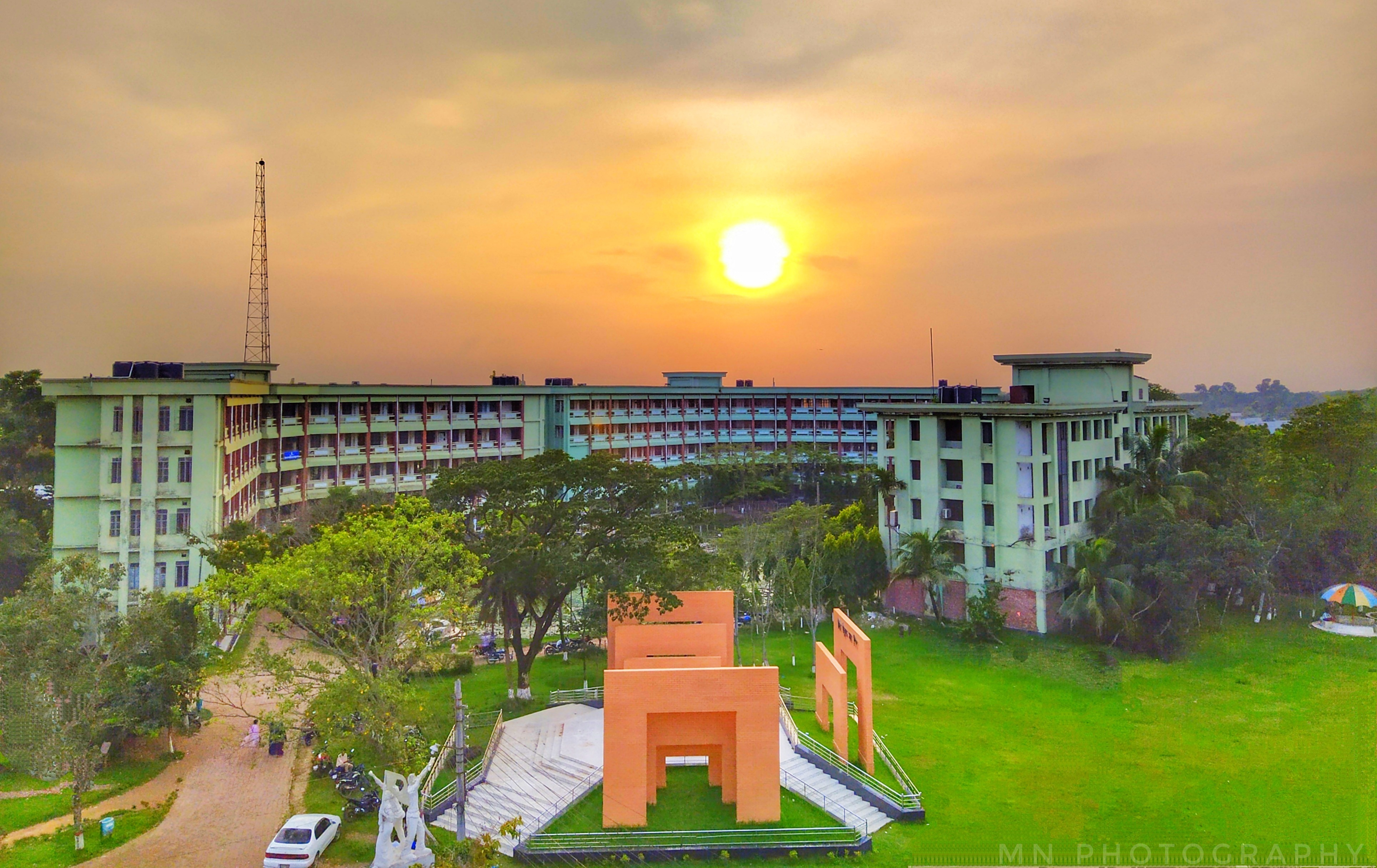
Jatiya Kabi Kazi Nazrul Islam University

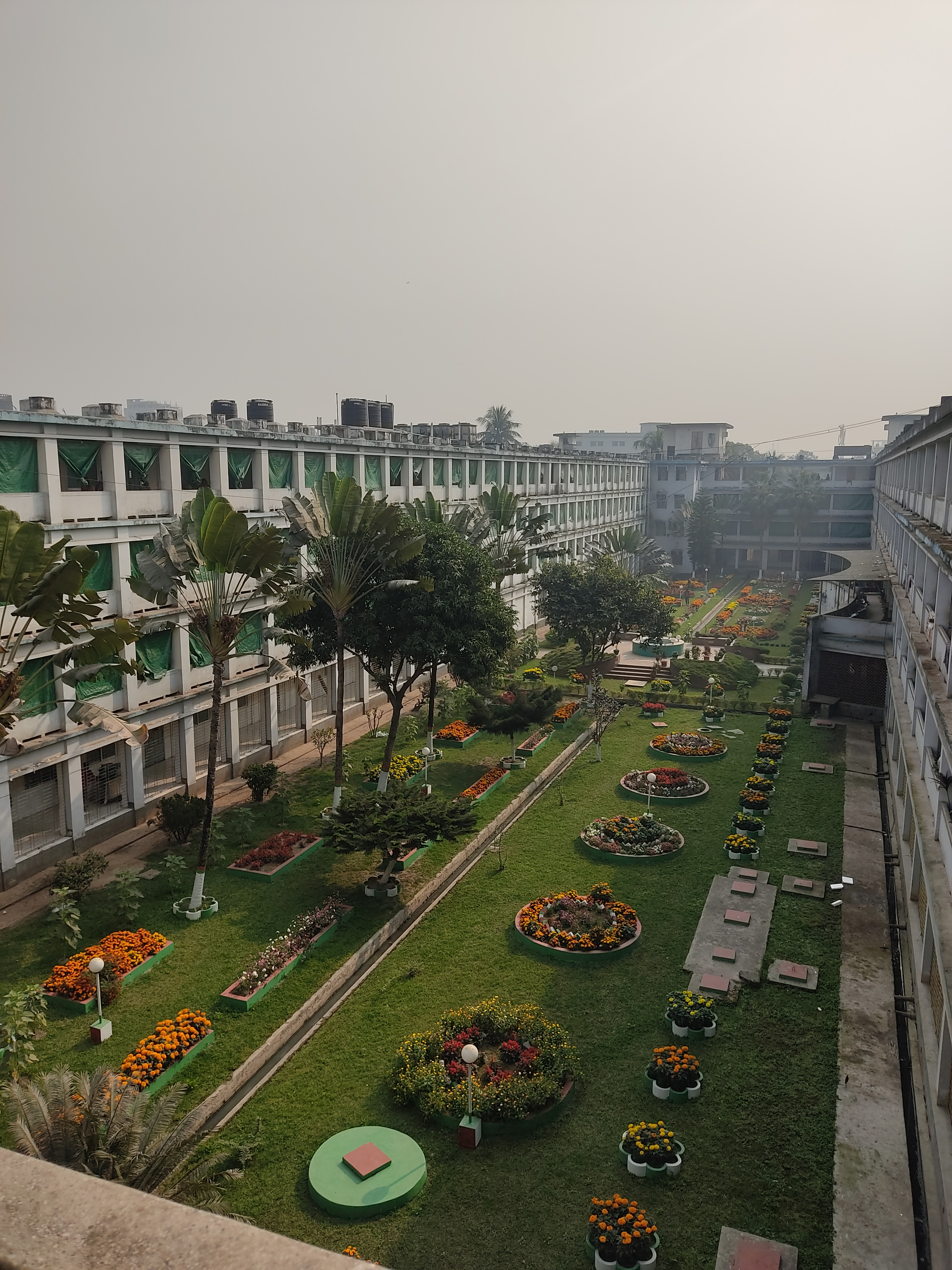
Mymensingh Medical College

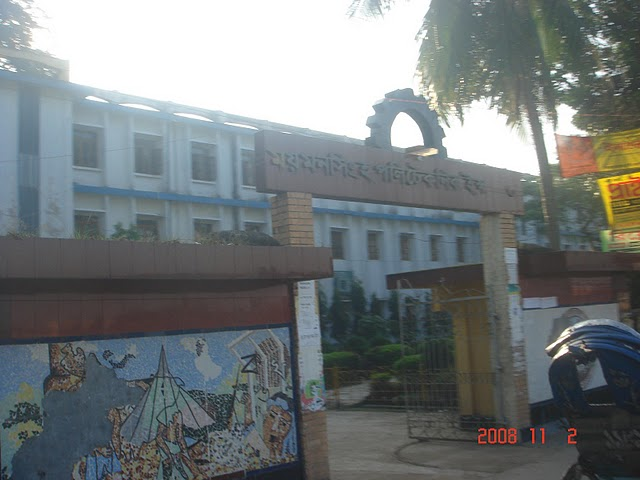
Mymensingh Polytechnic Institute

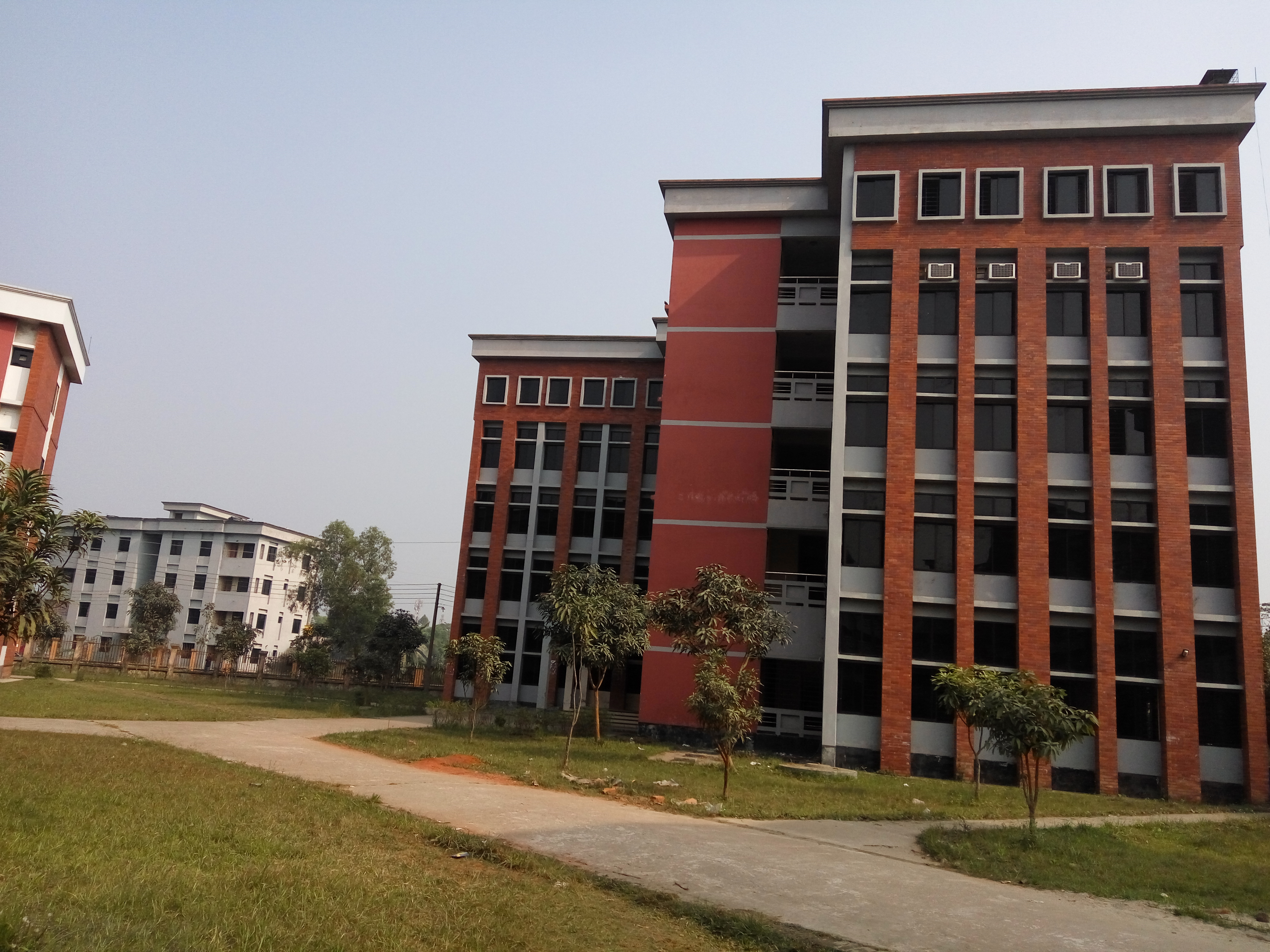
Mymensingh Engineering College (MEC) [(Proposed) Mymensingh University of Engineering and Technology]

Many students come from other districts for education. The city contains a number of universities, colleges, and schools, including:

- Jatiya Kabi Kazi Nazrul Islam University
- Bangladesh Agricultural University
- Mymensingh Medical College
- Mymensingh Engineering College
- Mymensingh Girls' Cadet College
- Ananda Mohan College
- Shahid Syed Nazrul Islam College
- Muminunnesa Women's College
- Mymensingh Government College
- Nasirabad College, Mymensingh
- Agricultural University College, Mymensingh
- Mymensingh Polytechnic Institute
- Notre Dame College, Mymensingh
- Women Teachers Training College
- Royal Media College
- Mymensingh Zilla School
- Alamgir Monsur Memorial College
- Vidyamayee Govt. Girls' High School
- Govt. Laboratory High School, Mymensingh
- Mukul Niketon High School
- Cantonment Public School and College, Mymensingh

== Transportation ==
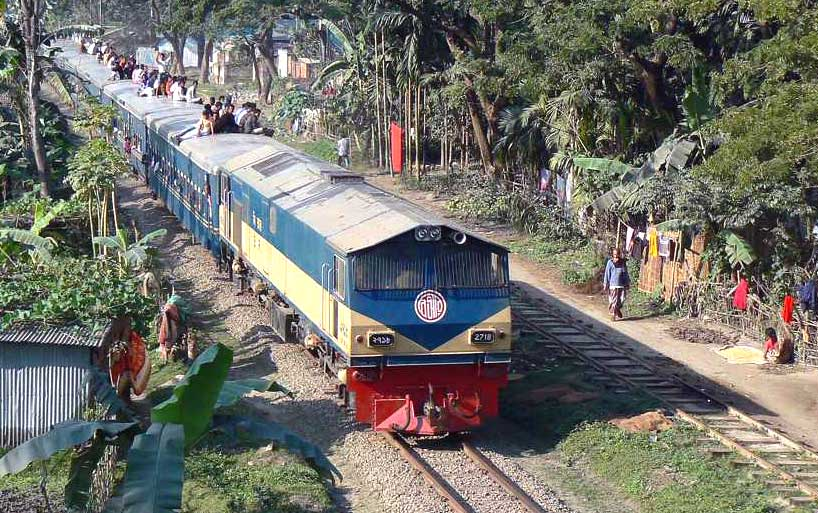
Intercity 'Tista Express' heading towards Dhaka.

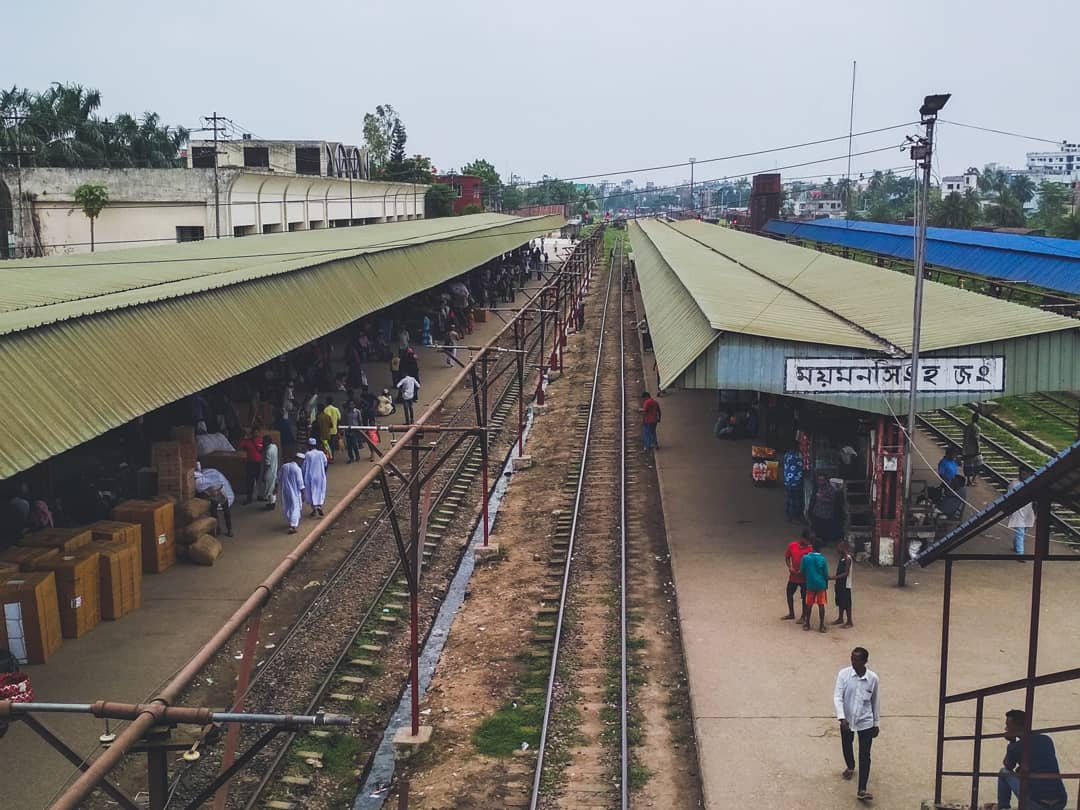
Mymensingh railway junction

The distance from Mymensingh to Dhaka is about 120 km (75 mi) from the Mohakhali bus stop. The city was linked with Dhaka after the railway lines were connected around 1865. The road link to Dhaka was via Tangail until the president ordered the completion of the half-finished N3 national highway between Dhaka and Mymensingh via Bhaluka. In 2012, the bus fare in the city was around TK.100–220 (US$1.45–$2.75) per person. However, rickshaw and "Auto" is the main mode of transportation within the city area, and the growth of the number of cars is highly progressive. Three-wheelers started to ply toward the end of the 1990s.

Train is by far the cheapest means to get to Mymensingh: Narayanganj-Bahadurabad Ghat Line. Apart from a number of local and direct trains, Ekota Express, Aghnibina Express, Tista Express, Brahmaputra Express, Jamuna Express and Balaka Express connect the town with the capital of Dhaka. Train fares range from 55 tk to 483 tk ($0.68 to $4) per person depending upon the class and the train itself. There are 7 Seat Categories. Shuvon 120 tk, Shuvon Chair 140 tk, First class Seat 185 tk, First class Birth 280 tk, Snigdha 271 tk, AC seat 322 tk, Ac Birth 483 tk. It takes almost or over 3 hours to reach Mymensingh from Dhaka by train. There are 3 main stopages station: Dhaka Airport railway station, Joydebpur and Gafargaon Upazila. All inter-city trains connect the city with Jamalpur town as well. Several local trains run between Mymensingh town to Kishoreganj and Netrokona.From 2012 a special train started from Mymensingh to "Bongobondhu Jamuna Shetu" named "Dholesshori Express". Prime Minister Sheikh Hasina was present there at the starting day of the new train. The Haor Express train is popular among passengers who visit from Mohongonj(Netrokona) to Dhaka via Mymensingh. Some years ago, a special train called 'Demu Train" started at the route Mymensingh to Joydevpur (Gajipur).

== Health care and cemeteries ==
Maharaja Suryakanata set up the first public hospital in Mymensingh along the river Brahmaputra. This is now a leprosy hospital and now called the "S K Hospital." Mymensingh Medical College hospital was established in 1962 and is one of the oldest and biggest hospitals in Bangladesh. Since the end of the 1990s, private investment in the medical sector has gone up and a number of private hospitals of various sizes and clinics have been established. Situated over about 40 acres (16 ha) of land, the Golkibari Cemetery is the largest Muslim cemetery of the town. There is another Muslim graveyard at Kalibari named Kalibari Gorosthan. The Hindu Shmoshanghat in Kewatkhali by the side of Brahmaputra railway bridge and the Christian cemetery of the colonial British are also present, and various other smaller cemeteries.

== Media and literature ==
Bharat Mihir was one of the oldest newspapers published from Mymensingh in British India. Its publication commenced in 1875. After independence in 1971, Habibur Rahman Sheikh published in 1979 the first daily under the name and title Dainik Jahan, following his decade-long trial with weekly Banglar Darpan which had been launched in 1972. He also published a women's monthly under the title Chandrakash for almost a decade. The other newspapers published from the city include Dainik Ajker Bangladesh and Dainik Ajker Khabar. Newspapers published from Dhaka came by train and was available around the noon until the 1980s. Hawkers riding bicycle would deliver newspapers from home to home by the afternoon. As the roadlink with Dhaka improved, buses were used for transportation of Dhaka newspapers. Now newspapers from Dhaka arrive Mymensingh by 9.00 in the morning and are delivered to homes by the noon.

Mymensingh Press Club, situated near Ganginarpar is a vibrant hub for the intellectuals, teachers, literature and cultural activists, in addition to media peoples. It hosts literary events, cultural functions and such other activities on a regular basis. Mymensingh Press Club was established towards the end of 1959. It was set up in course of a provincial conference of journalists and editors of the-then East Pakistan, held on 7–8 March 1959. Literary circles of note were Sahitya Sava and Troyodaosh Sammilini. Earlier, in the 1960s, a leader of the Ahmadya community, Ahmad Toufiq Chowdhury, had set up printing press in his residence at Maharaja Road to bring out a periodic magazine entitled Writupatra. Poets Musharraf Karim and Farid Ahmed Dulal and writer Iffat Ara are some of the important literary names from Mymensingh. In 1985, Ara set up a press in her own residence to bring out the monthly Dwitiyo Chinta.

State-owned Bangladesh Television has a relay television station located in Mymensingh's Akua neighborhood. It is slated to become a regional television station soon.

== Notable people ==
Bengali scientist Sir Jagadish Chandra Bose was born in Mymensingh in his maternal uncle’s home, Bengal presidency (now Mymensingh, Bangladesh) on 30 November 1858. The name of Mymensingh is associated with people like anti-British leader Mahadev Sannyal, writer Upendra Kishore Roychowdhury, Sukumar Ray and Leela Majumdar, musician and a disciple of Rabindranath Tagore, Shilpacharya Zainul Abedin, novelist Shirshendu Mukhopadhyay who received early education in Mymensingh town, Humayun Ahmed a Bengali writer, Mahmudul Hasan – Islamic Scholar, P.C. Sorcar – magician, Abul Fateh diplomat, statesman, Sufi, Liberation hero and the first Foreign Secretary of Bangladesh, acting president of Bangladesh during the war of liberation Syed Nazrul Islam in addition to three other presidents of the country, including, Justice Abu Sayeed Chowdhury and Shahabuddin Ahmed. Politician and author Abul Mansur Ahmed, the-then Governor of East Pakistan Abdul Monem Khan, educationist principal Ibrahim Khan, poets Nirmalendu Goon, Helal Hafiz, and Abid Azad, geologist Subhrangsu Kanta Acharyya, writer Jatin Sarker.

Golam Samdani Quraishy, writer, founder GS-BCUTA, Shahid Akhand, Helena Khan, Iffat Ara, are associated with Mymensingh.

The Oscar-winning Indian filmmaker Satyajit Ray and Bollywood actress Rani Mukerji's family hail from Mymensingh. Taslima Nasreen, the feminist writer hails from the district as well. The city is also the birthplace and hometown of Mahmudullah Riyad, the first Bangladeshi to score a hundred in ICC World Cup.

== Gallery ==
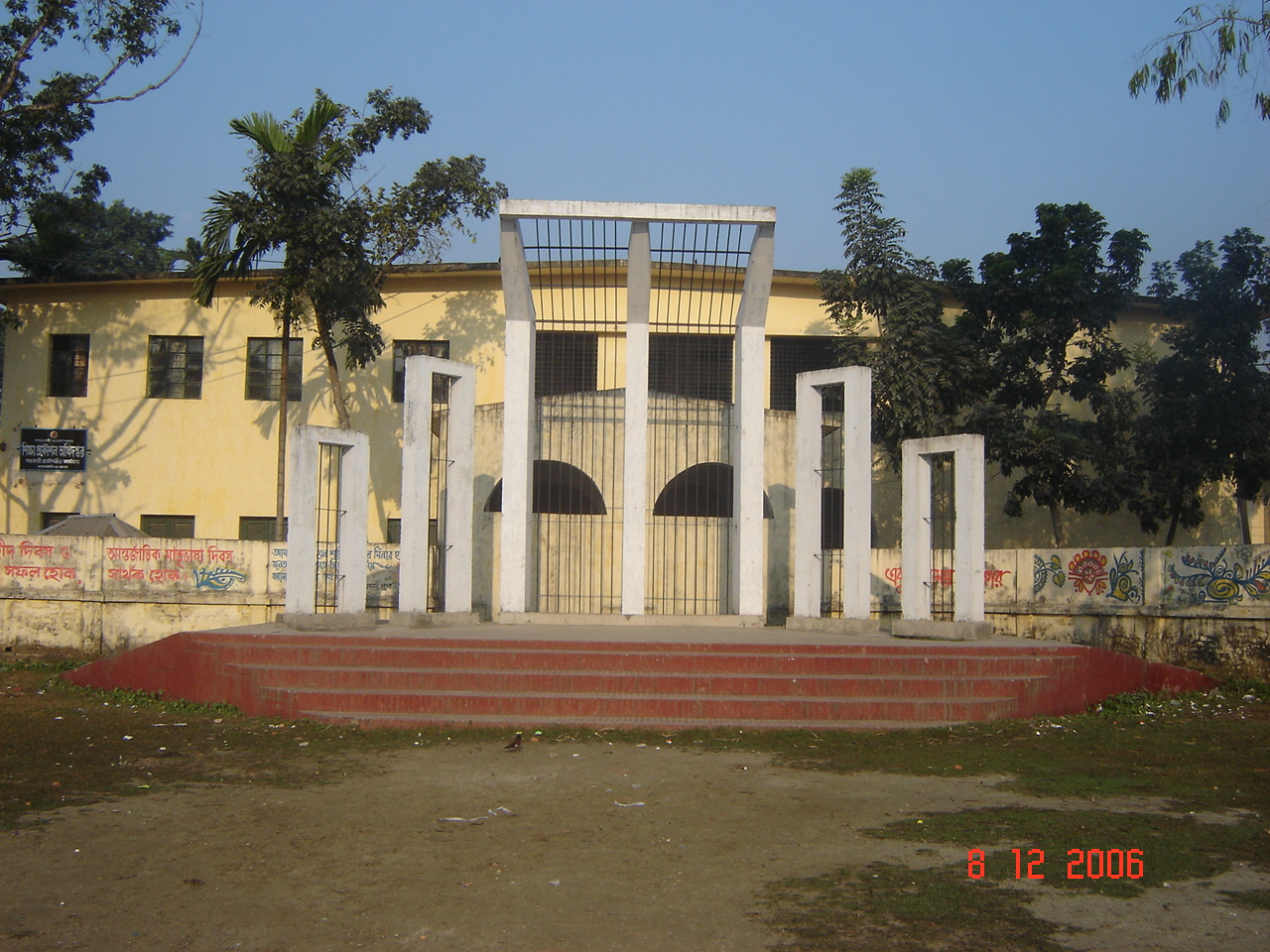
Monument of the martyrs of the Language Movement in Mymensingh

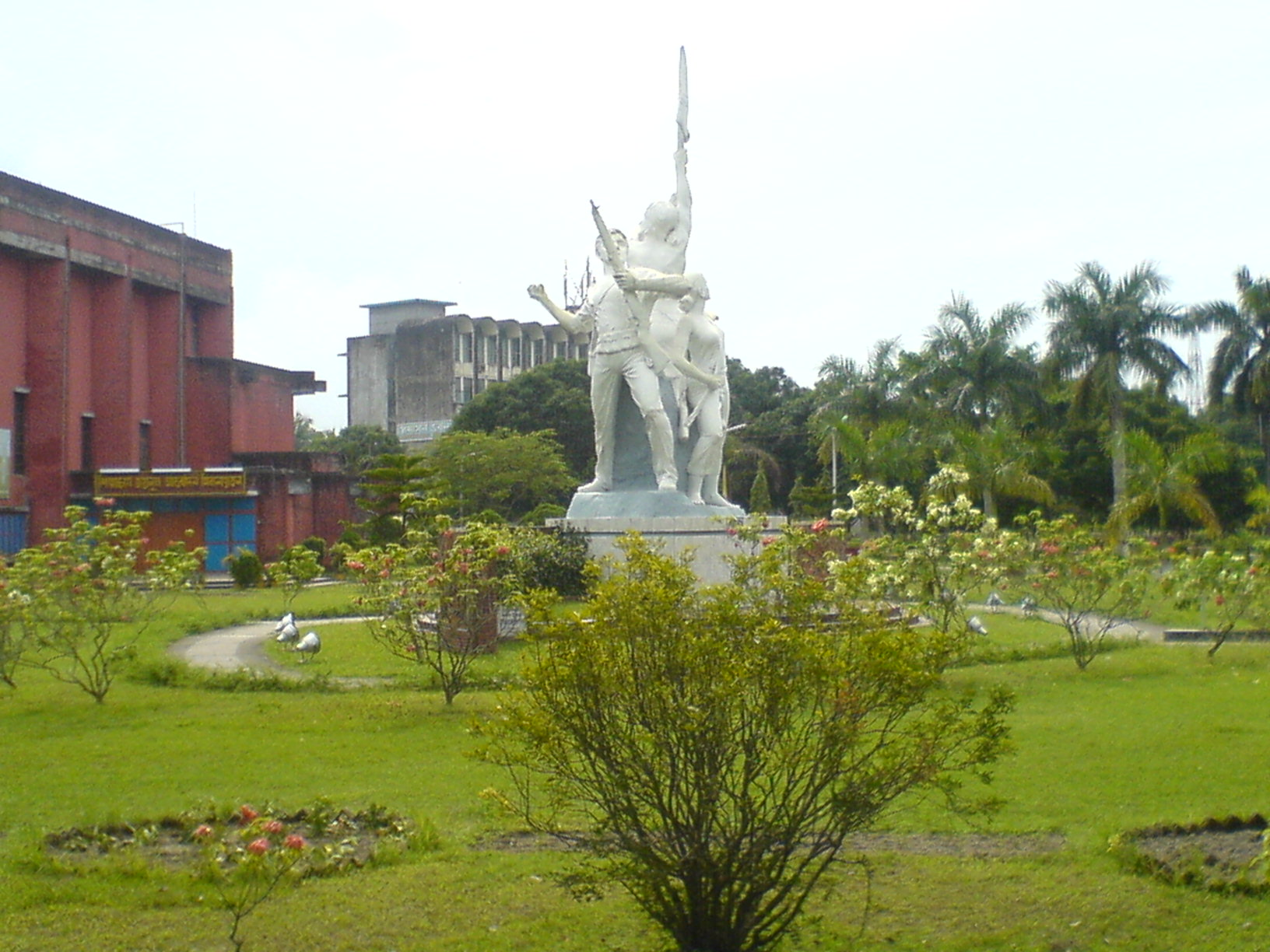
Bangladesh Agricultural University

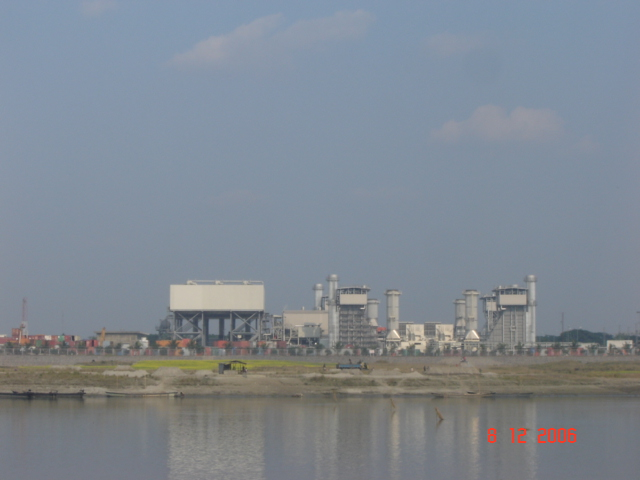
Mymensingh Power Station

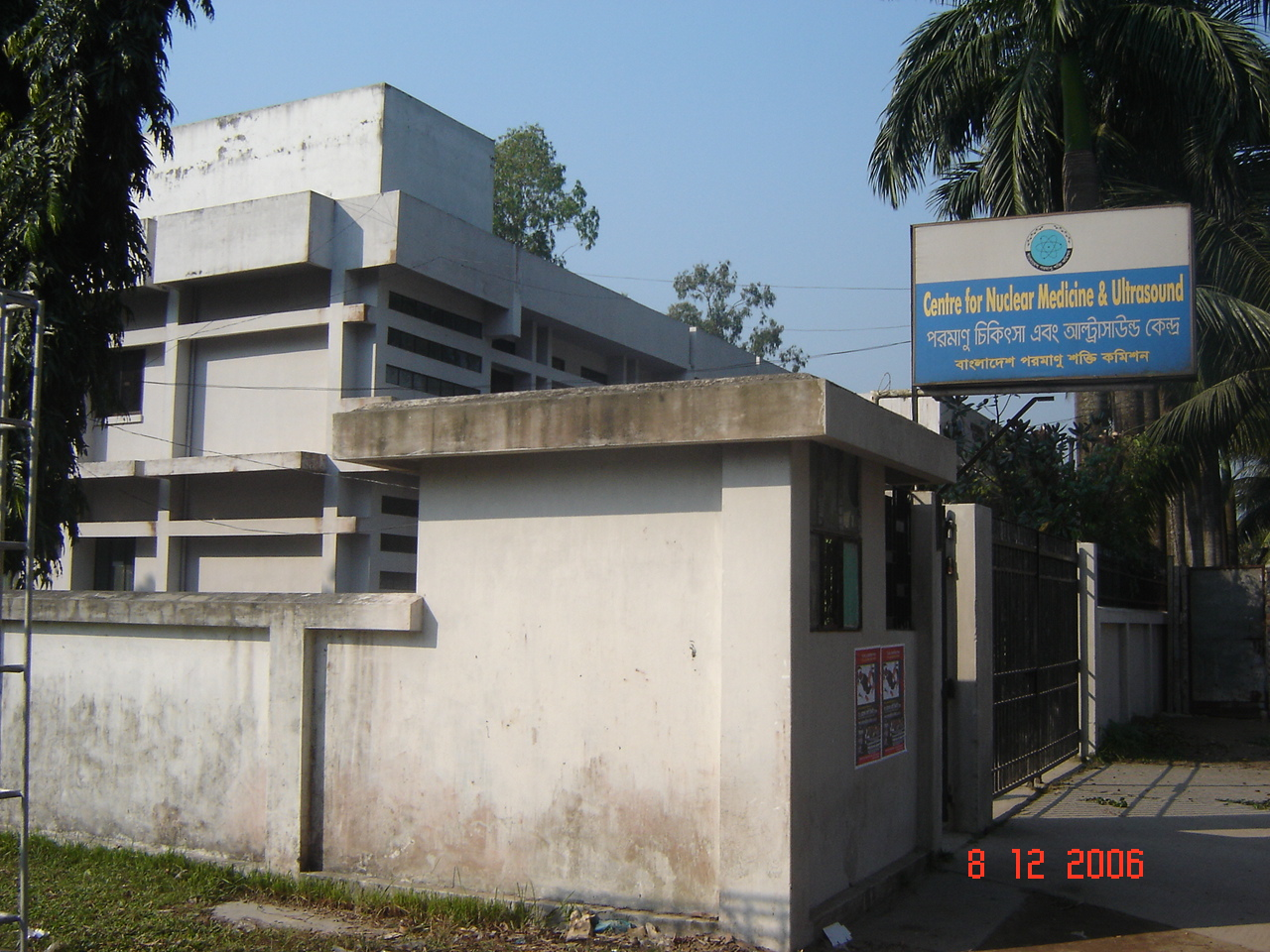
Centre for Nuclear Medicine and Ultrasound in MMCH

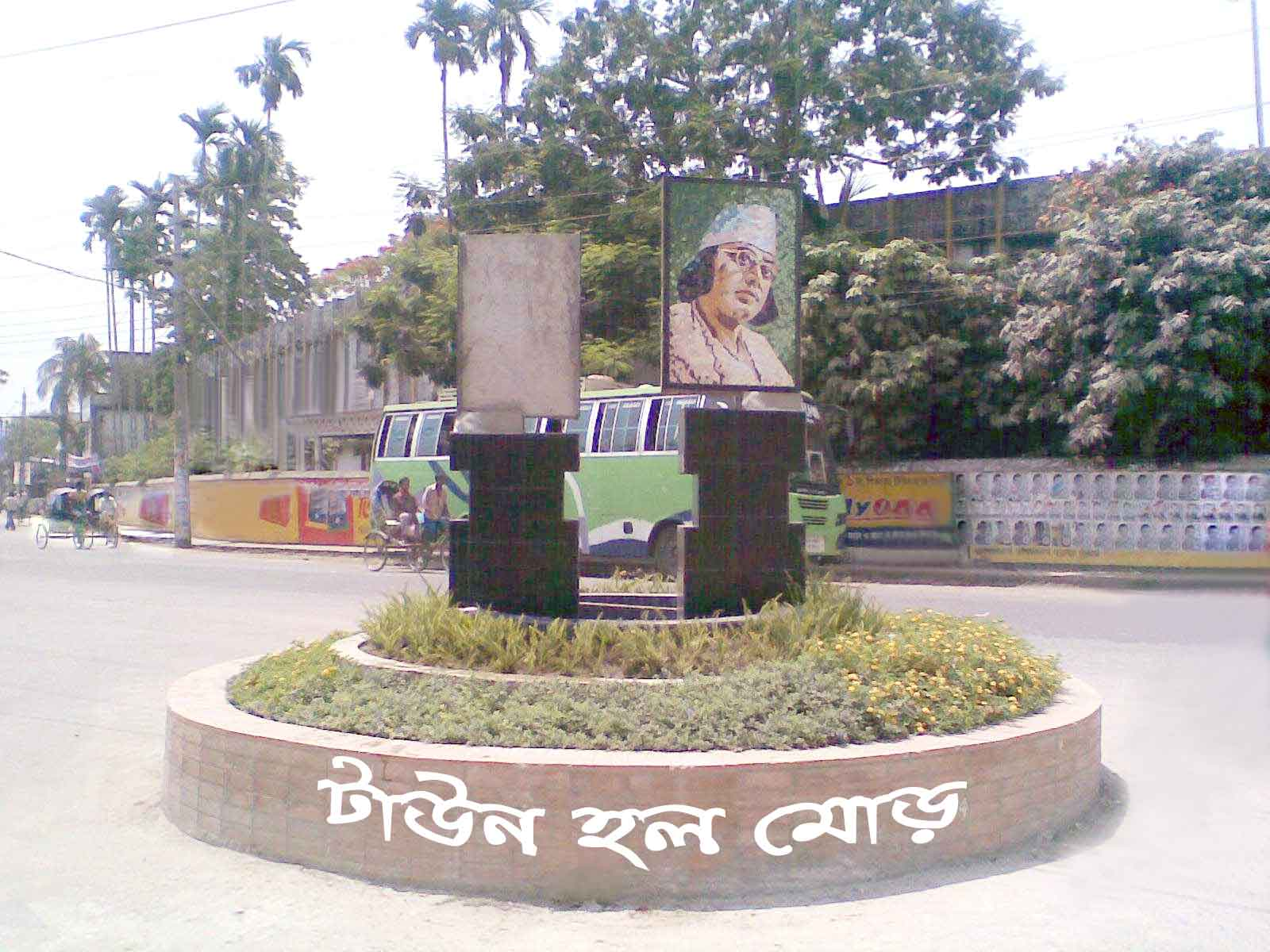
Town Hall Point

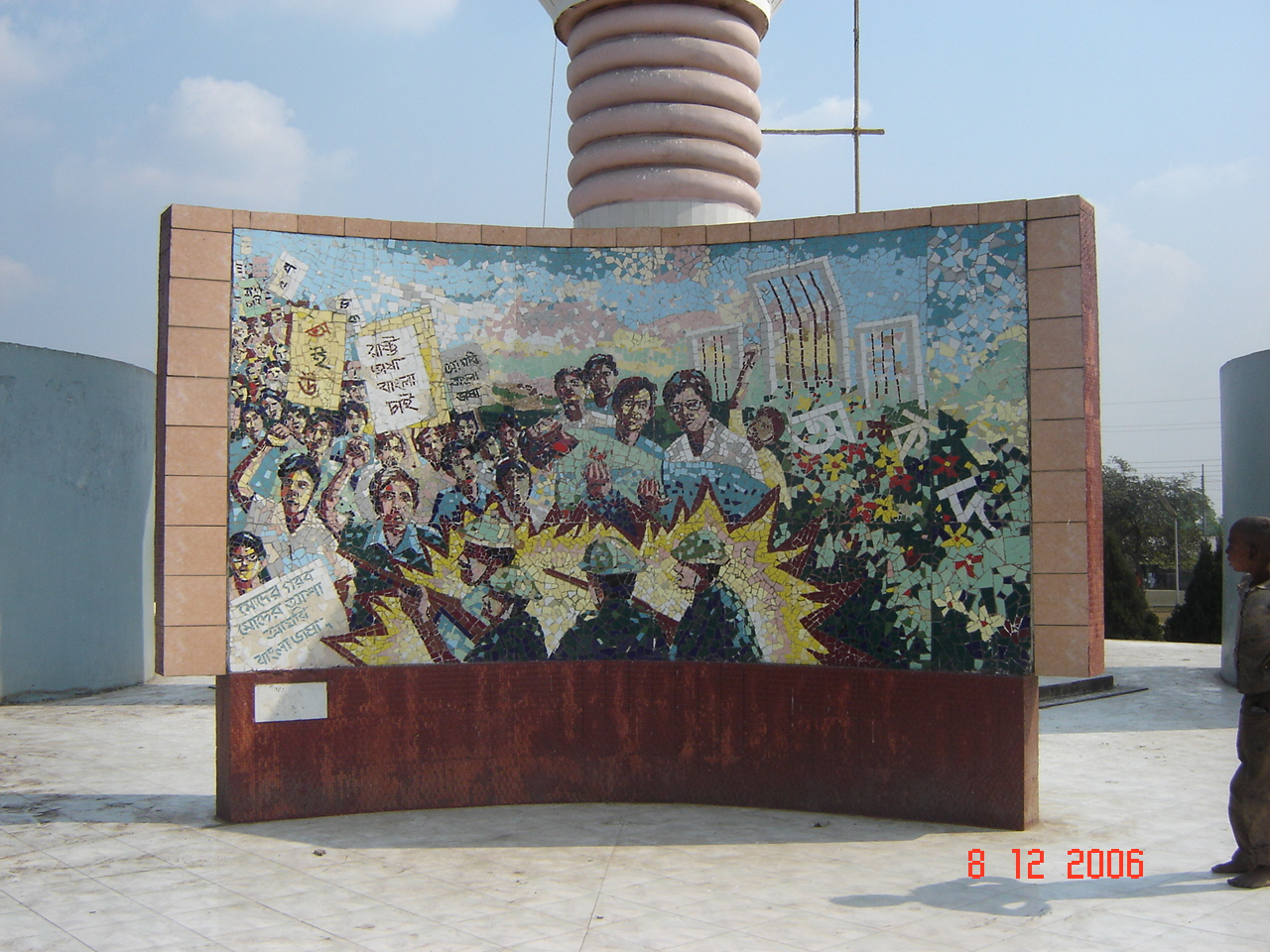
Mymensingh-1971 monument

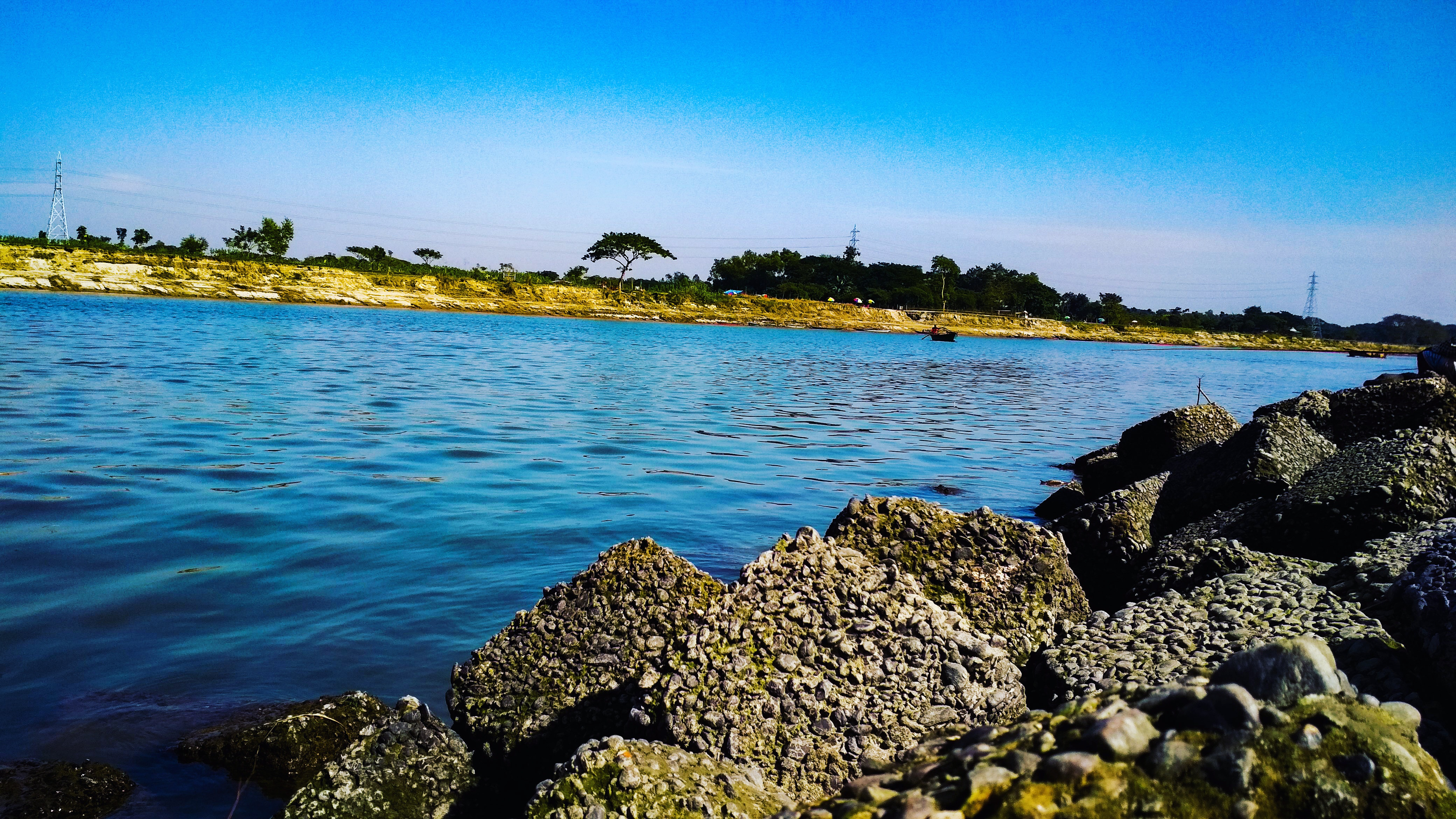
Old Brahmaputra, Mymensingh

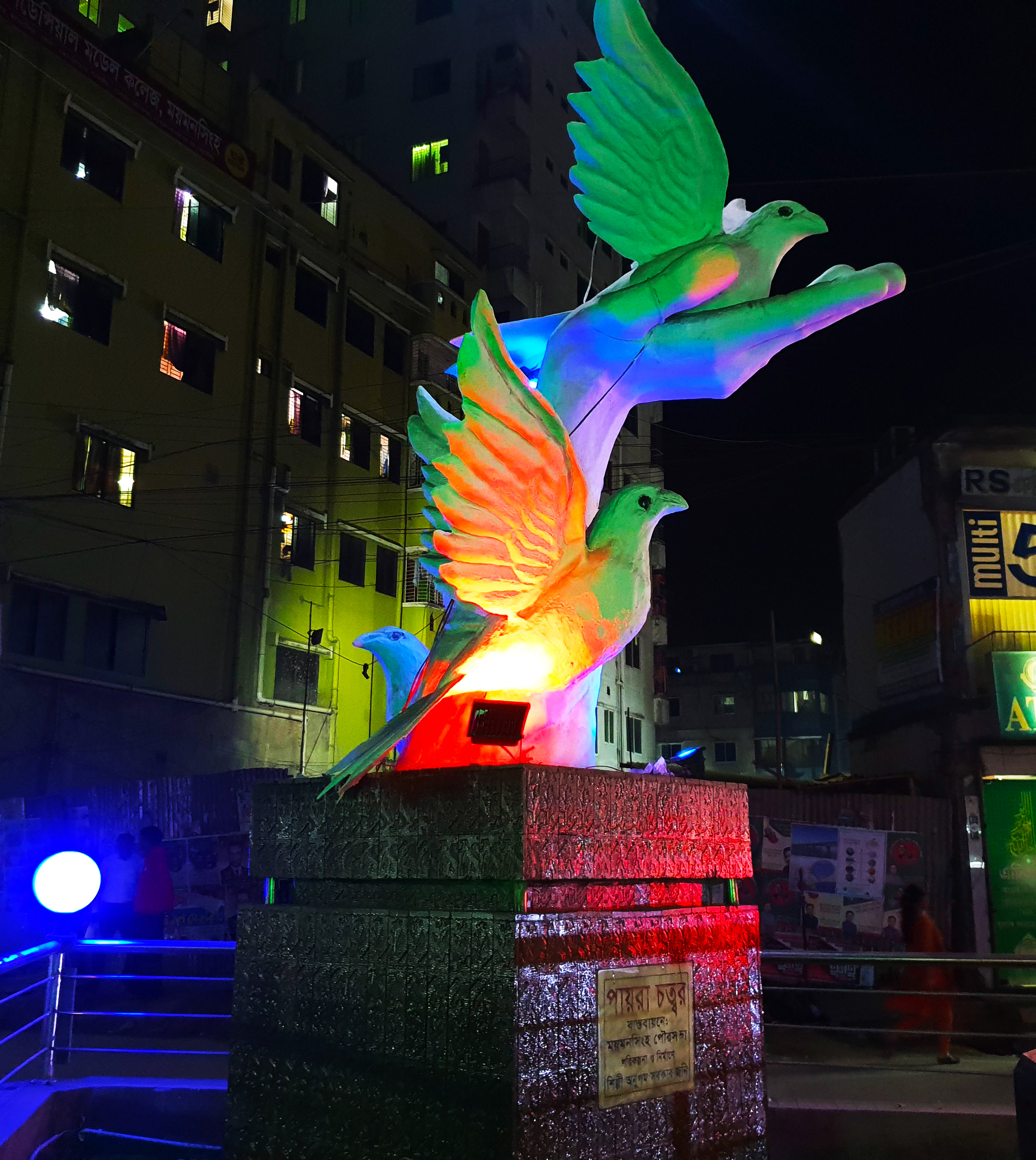
Payra Chattar, A sculpture in Natun Bazar Moor, Sadar Mymensingh

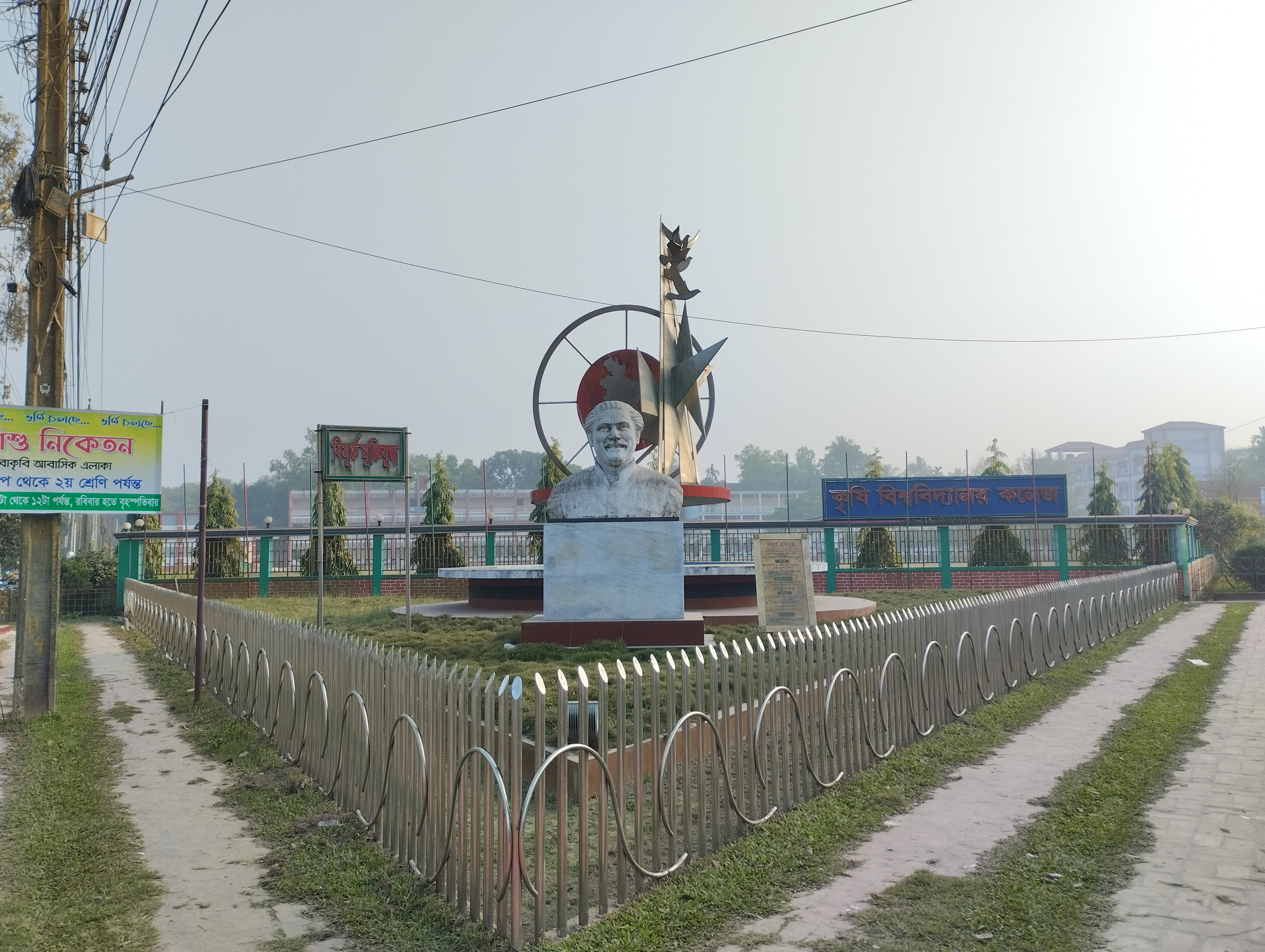
Abstract of liberation war at Bangladesh Agricultural University (BAU)
