= Zainul Abedin Museum =

Art museum in Mymensingh, Bangladesh

Zainul Abedin Sangrahashala
- জয়নুল আবেদিন সংগ্রহশালা
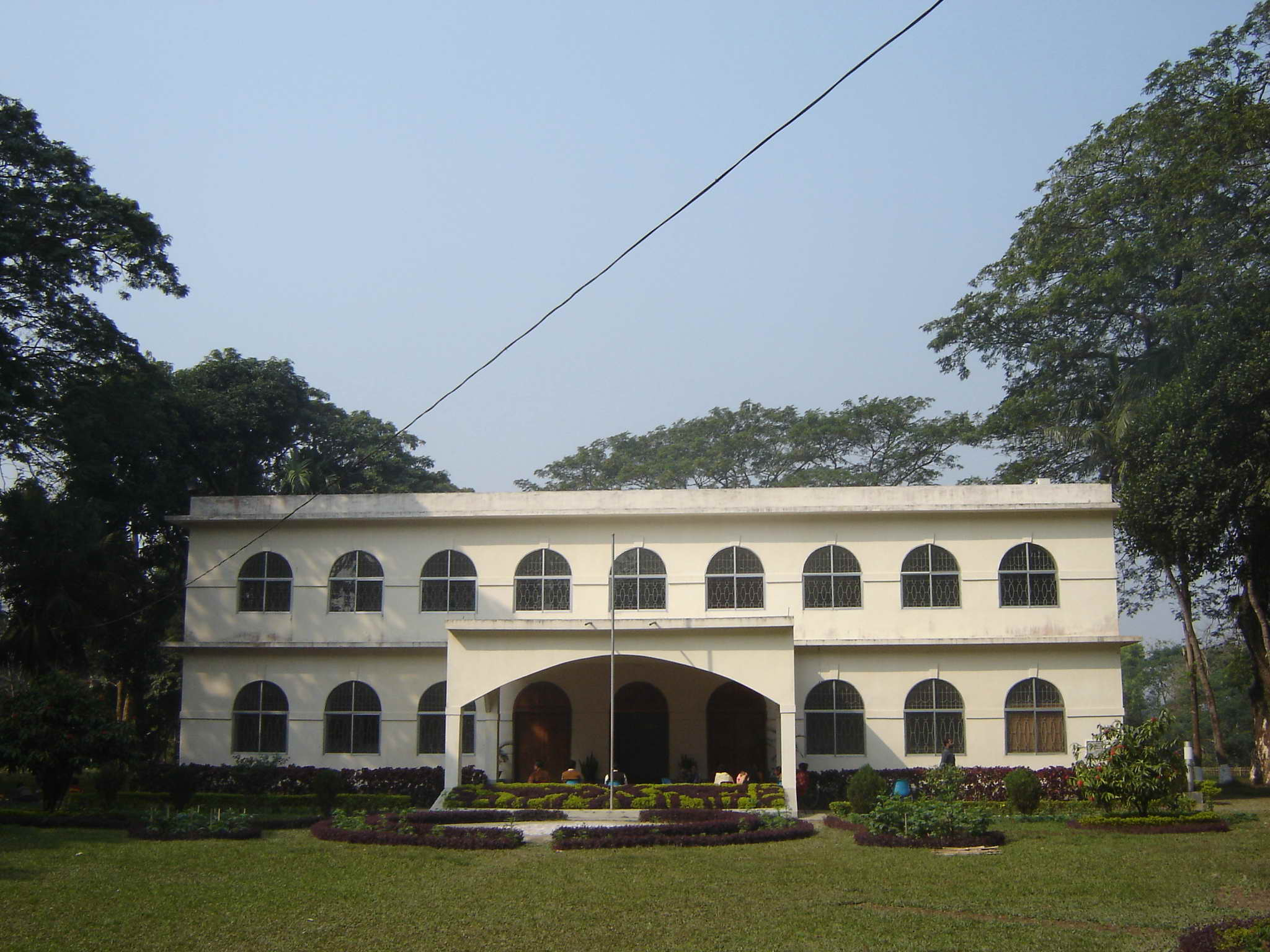
- Shilpacharya Zainul Abedin Museum main building
- Established: 15 April 1975
- Location: Mymensingh
- Coordinates: 24°46′13″N 90°23′42″E

Zainul Abedin Sangrahashala (alternate: Shilpacharya Zainul Abedin Sangrahashala; translation: "Great Teacher of the Arts 'Zainul Abedin' Art Gallery") is an art museum in Mymensingh, Bangladesh. Established in 1975, it contains the collections of the artist Shilpacharya Zainul Abedin (1914–1976). The art gallery was established in Mymensingh, as this is where the artist spent his early days. Abedin, a pioneer of the country's modern art movement, created works of art on subject matters such as the Bengal famine of 1943 and the peoples' independence. The museum is located in the area of Shaheeb Quarter Park on the bank of the Old Bramaputra River.

Each year in December, the gallery authority organizes an anniversary programme that includes a discussion on the life and work of Zainul, as well as a painting competition. While the art gallery does not issue publications, Bangladesh National Museum, which has a collection of 800 Abedin paintings, has issued posters and cards on behalf of the artist. Shilpacharya Zainul Abedin Sangrahashala is a branch of the national museum.

== History ==
Born in Mymensingh, Abedin drew pictures sitting by the Brahmaputra River. While a student at the local Mrityunjay ("Triumph Over Death") School, he won the first prize in The Bombay Chronicle art competition. Subsequently, the school's headmaster sent more of Abedin's paintings to India. Devoted to his art, the school's teachers encouraged him to go to Kolkata, and, in 1933, Abedin was admitted to Calcutta Government Art School.

In the 1950s, Abedin began a movement of collecting neglected Bangladeshi artworks that were scattered all over rural areas of the country. The artist remained attached to his hometown, prompting the establishment of a museum in Mymensingh on 15 April 1975 in a building owned by a Mr. Barden, who later sold it to a member of the Viceroy's Executive Council. The gallery opened with approximately 70 pieces of art that included oil paintings and drawings by Abedin during his tours abroad. The gallery was initially run by a committee that was assisted by a local administration.

In its early years, it had 77 of Abedin's paintings, but in 1982, seventeen pieces of art were stolen from the museum, only ten of which were retrieved in 1994. Renovations began in 1997. Two years later, the National Museum took charge of the gallery, and completed renovations in 2004 on the 3.2-acre (1.3 ha) facility. This included construction of a main gate, ticket counters, and walls. A projector, sound system, and dehumidifier were installed. An artists' cottage and an open-air stage were added.

== Collection ==
There are currently 53 oil paintings in the archive. The collection includes various themes and subjects, though most depict scenes of rural Bengal. Besides the original paintings, there are 16 replicas and 75 photographs of Zainul's life and works. There are also 69 mementos on display, such as brushes, a brush holder, bottles of turpentine and linseed oil, a carbon box, charcoal, wax, a colour palette, a colour tube, an easel, an ink pot, a leather portrait holder, a metal clip, a reed pen, a scraper, a spatula, and his spectacles. The mementos are situated in glass boxes in the midst of the gallery.

== Grounds ==
In accordance with Abedin's wishes, an art school has also been established in the museum grounds. Artists can stay at the Art Cottage, which is located in a separate three-room building. An open-air stage is used by students on study tours and may be rented by others.
