= Taslimuddin Ahmed =

Bengali footballer

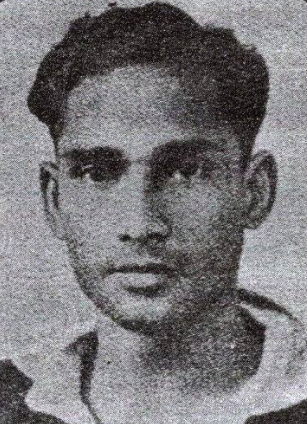
- Taslim with Kolkata Mohammedan

Personal information
- Full name: Taslimuddin Ahmed
- Date of birth: c. 1918
- Place of birth: Mymensingh, British India (present-day Bangladesh)
- Date of death: 13 September 1969 (aged 52)
- Place of death: Dhaka, East Pakistan
- Position: Goalkeeper

Senior career*
Years	Team	Apps	(Gls)
1936–1947	Kolkata Mohammedan		
1948	Khulna Muslim Club		
- * Club domestic league appearances and goals

Taslimuddin Ahmed (Bengali: তসলিমুদ্দিন আহমেদ; c. 1918 – 13 September 1969), better known as Taslim, was a Bengali footballer who played as a goalkeeper for Kolkata Mohammedan in the early 1930s until the partition of India.

== Early life ==
Taslim was born in Mymensingh, Bengal, British India. He began playing football while studying at the George Telegraph Training Institute in Bhowanipore, Calcutta. He played in numerous Inter-School Football Tournaments as a centre-forward with his school team, before transitioning to a goalkeeper.

== Club career ==
=== Kolkata Mohammedan ===
In 1936, Taslim joined Kolkata Mohammedan and competed in the Calcutta Football League. He notably won the First Division title in his debut year. For much of his tenure at the club, he served as a reserve goalkeeper, playing behind established first-choice custodians Osman Jan and Kalu Khan.

In 1941, however, Taslim was entrusted with the role of first-choice goalkeeper when Mohammedan took part in the Montmorency Football Tournament in Lahore. In the semi-final on 10 April, Mohammedan secured a 6–1 victory over a British Regiment battalion side, with Taslim making two decisive saves. He retained his place for the final on 14 April at the Burt Institute Ground, where Mohammedan defeated Lahore D.F.A. 3–0. Taslim produced another key second-half save to preserve a clean sheet and help his side clinch the title. In April, Mohammedan won the Delhi Football Association Shield Tournament, with Taslim featuring in the tournament final against Delhi Union FC on 30 April, which his team won 3–0.

=== Final years ===
Following the partition of India, Taslim returned to East Bengal where he played for Khulna Muslim Club, featuring in the Ronaldshay Shield final against Dhaka Wanderers Club at the DSA Ground, Dhaka. In 1954, he represented the East Pakistan Veterans XI in an exhibition match against the Calcutta Veterans XI, organized as part of the IFA Diamond Jubilee Festival in Calcutta. In 1956, Taslim turned out for the Veterans Club in the Ronaldshay Shield, the team was composed of former Bengali footballers who had previously competed in Calcutta.

== Post-retirement ==
In 1967, Taslim joined Eastern Banking Corporation in Dhaka as a Development Officer and served at its local offices in Shantinagar and, lastly, in Purana Paltan.

== Death ==
Taslim died of cardiac arrest on 13 September 1969 in Dhaka. He was survived by his wife, a daughter, and a son.

== Honours ==
Mohammedan Sporting Club

- Calcutta Football League: 1936, 1937, 1938, 1940, 1941
- Durand Cup: 1940
- IFA Shield: 1936, 1941, 1942
