= Shambhuganj =

Area of Mymensingh, Bangladesh

Coordinates: 24.7629°N 90.4509°E

Shambhuganj is an area of Mymensingh, Bangladesh. It is situated on the other side of the Brahmaputra, connected by the Shambhuganj Bridge. Roadways to places like Kishoreganj and Netrokona follow through Shambhuganj.

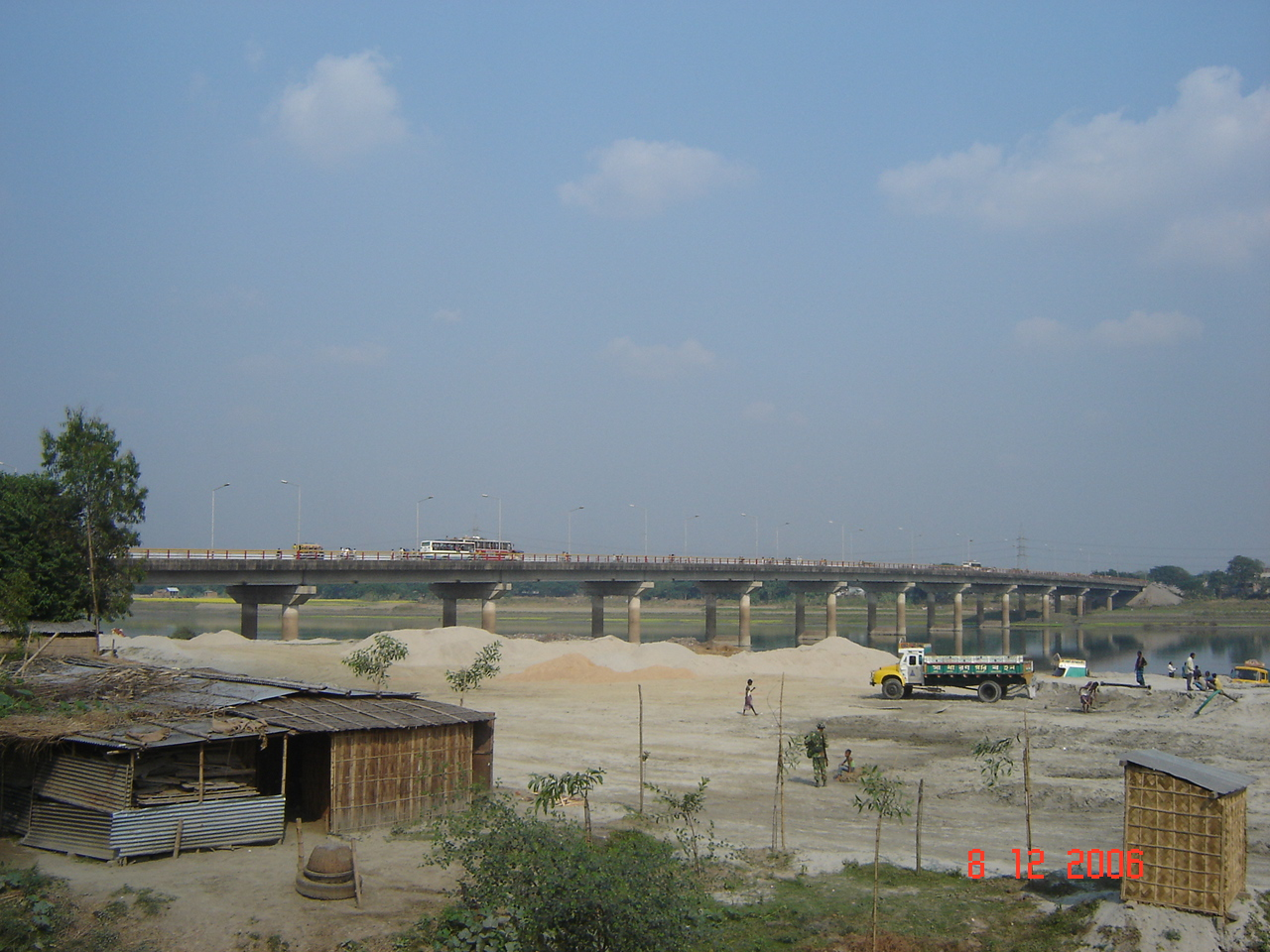
Shambhuganj bridge

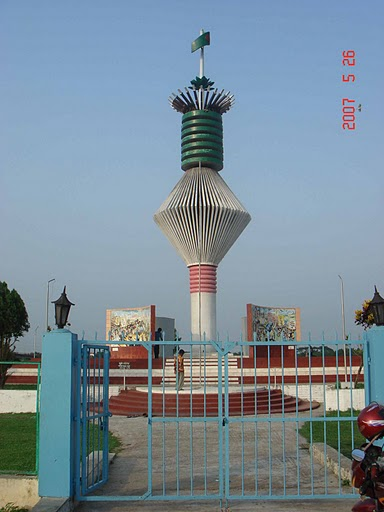
Monument of the Liberation War of Bangladesh

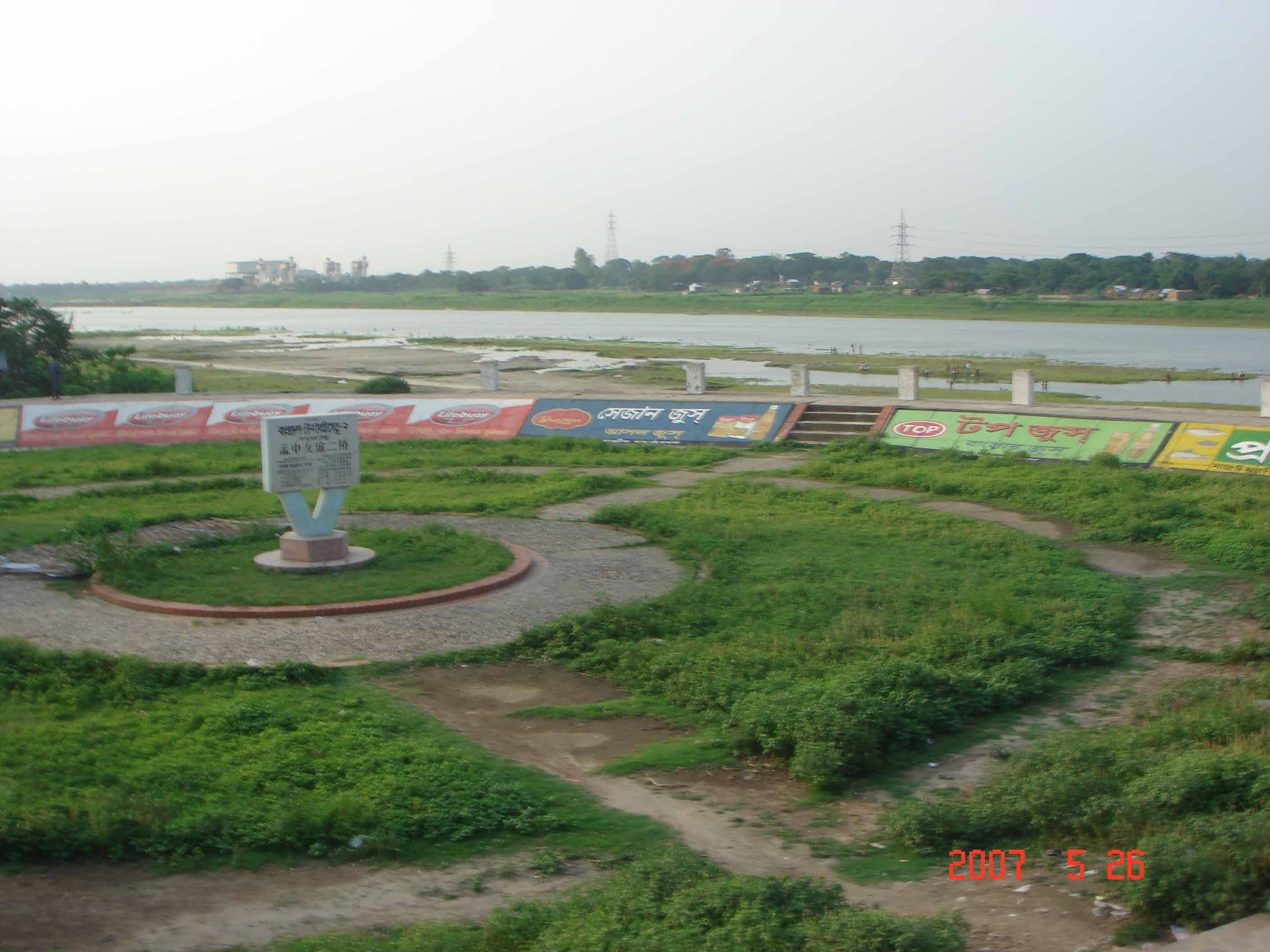
Inauguration board in Shambuganga bridge Mymensingh

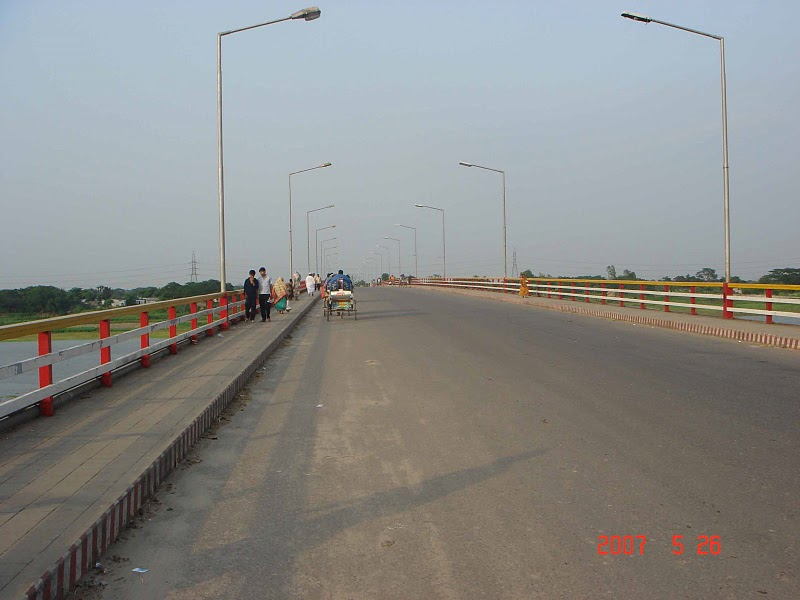
Shambhuganj bridge in Mymensingh

== Educational institutes of Shumbhuganj ==
Shambhuganj has many primary schools, high schools, colleges and madrasas.

- Raghabpur Rahmania Senior Fajil Madrasa is a degree-level institution which is in a village area. It was founded by Mofizuddin Sarker (1902–1976) with the cooperation of the village people. Mowlana Abdur Rahman was its founder principal.
- Shambhuganj GKP college: Founded by Dr. Mr. Sirajul Islam, who is also the founder of a local NGO - Gono Kallyan Parishad (GKP).
- Shambhuganj U.C. High School: Founded by Mr. Aniruddin Mondol.
- Mojhahardi high school: Is the renowned high school in this area founded hundred years ago.
- Ananda Mohan College was established in 1908 by Ananda Mohan Basu, the first Asian wrangler in mathematics from Cambridge. This college is surrounded with the teacher's quarters, big playgrounds, ancients buildings, and with scenic gardens and trees.
- Government Laboratory High school: Established in 1988 by a convener committee led by Mr. Salehuzzaman Khan (Runu). The first batch S.S.C. in 1991 re-united in 1998 in Alexandra Castle School campus under Govt. Laboratory School Old Students org.
