= List of Bangladeshi writers =

The Writers listed below were either born in Bangladesh or else published much of their writing while living in that country.

A B C D E F G H I J K L M N O P Q R S T U V W X Y Z

== A ==
- Abdul Hakim
- Abu Ishaque
- Abul Mansur Ahmed
- Abdullah Abu Sayeed
- Abdush Shakoor
- Abu Rushd
- Abdur Rouf Choudhury
- Abul Fazal
- Abul Asad
- Abdul Mannan Syed
- Akhteruzzaman Elias
- Al Mahmud
- Alaol
- Alauddin Al-Azad
- Anisul Hoque
- Anwar Pasha
- Aly Zaker
- Ahsan Habib
- Ahmed Sofa
- Aroj Ali Matubbar
- Asad Chowdhury
- Abdullah AL Mamun (Kaikor)

== B ==
- Bande Ali Mia
- Begum Rokeya
- Bipradash Barua
- Burhana islam

== D ==
- Dilwar Khan
- Dilara Hashem

== F ==
- Farah Ghuznavi
- Farrukh Ahmad

== G ==
- Golam Mostofa

== H ==
- Harun Ar Rashid
- Humayun Ahmed
- Humayun Azad
- Hasan Azizul Huq
- Hason Raja
- Hasnat Abdul Hye
- Humayun Kabir Dhali
- Husne Ara Shahed

== I ==
- Imdadul Haq Milan
- Ismail Hossain Siraji

== J ==
- Jahanara Imam
- Jasimuddin
- Shahid Mahmud Jangi

== K ==
- Kaberi Gain
- Kabir Chowdhury
- Kaykobad
- Kazi Nazrul Islam
- K. Anis Ahmed
- Khondakar Ashraf Hossain

== M ==
- Mir Mosharraf Hossain
- Moinul Ahsan Saber
- Muhammad Asadullah Al-Ghalib
- Mohammad Barkatullah
- Mohammad Lutfur Rahman
- Mokbula Manzoor
- Mohammad Nurul Huda
- Muhammed Zafar Iqbal
- Muhammad Mansuruddin
- Muhammad Shahidullah
- Munier Choudhury
- M Sakhawat Hossain

== N ==
- Nurul Momen
- Nirmalendu Goon
- Neamat Imam
- Nilima Ibrahim

== R ==
- Rahat Khan
- Rashid Askari
- Rashid Haider
- Rashid Karim
- Razia Khan
- Rizia Rahman
- Rifat Hasan
- Rudra Mohammad Shahidullah

== S ==
- Sadat Hossain
- Selim Al Deen
- Selina Hossain
- Shaheen Akhtar
- Shahidullah Kaiser
- Shahidul Zahir
- Shamsuddin Abul Kalam
- Shamsur Rahman
- Shawkat Ali (novelist)
- Shawkat Osman
- Shazia Omar
- Sufia Kamal
- Sheikh Fazlul Karim
- Syed Ali Ahsan
- Syed Mujtaba Ali
- Syed Shamsul Haque
- Syed Waliullah
- Saad Z Hossain

== T ==
- Tahmima Anam

== Z ==
- Zahir Raihan

== See also ==
- Bengali Literature
- List of Bangladeshi people
- List of Bangladeshi women writers
