= List of Bangladeshi women writers =

This is a list of notable women writers who were born in Bangladesh or whose writings are closely associated with that country.

== A ==
- Nahar Kamal Ahmad (born 1935), Poetess, Short Story writer, Child litterateur, Researcher, Editor, Translator
- Shaheen Akhtar (born 1962), novelist, short story writer, editor
- Monica Ali (born 1967), Bangladeshi-British novelist, essayist
- Tahmima Anam (born 1975), novelist, short story writer, essayist
- Iffat Ara (born 1939), novelist, short story writer, essayist, magazine editor, educator, women's rights activist
- Husne Ara Shahed (1939–2022), novelist, non-fiction writer, educator
- Shamim Azad (born 1952), Bangladeshi-British poet, short story writer, novelist, children's writer

== B ==
- Purabi Basu (born 1949), 21st-century short story writer, women's rights activist

== H ==
- Anwara Syed Haq (born 1940), novelist, short story writer, children's writer, essayist
- Dilara Hashem (1935–2022), novelist
- Roquia Sakhawat Hussain (1880–1932), essayist, short story writer, novelist, poet, feminist, author of Sultana's Dream
- Selina Hossain (born 1947), acclaimed novelist

== I ==
- Nilima Ibrahim (1921–2002), non-fiction writer, novelist, playwright, short story writer, translator, educator
- Jahanara Imam (1929–1994), non-fiction writer, diarist, political activist

== J ==
- Nasreen Jahan (born 1966), novelist, editor
- Adiba Jaigirdar, Bangladeshi-Irish writer

== K ==
- Naila Kabeer (born 1950), social economist, non-fiction writer
- Siddika Kabir (1931–2012), cookbook writer, television host
- Sufia Kamal (1911–1999), poet, feminist
- Rabina Khan (born 1972), Bangladeshi-British novelist, playwright, film producer, politician
- Razia Khan (1936–2011), novelist
- Rabeya Khatun (1935–2021), novelist

== M ==
- Mokbula Manzoor (1938–2020), novelist
- Shahnaz Munni (born 1969), poet, short story writer, journalist, television news editor

== N ==
- Taslima Nasrin (born 1962), columnist, novelist, autobiographer

== R ==
- Rizia Rahman (1939–2019), novelist
- Kamini Roy (1864–1933), Bengali feminist, poet, essayist, children's writer in British India

== S ==
- Tamanna Smrity (born 1984), novelist, short story writer, fiction writer, doctor, Author of "Hotath Chhayar Vubone", "Chowdhury Kothon", "Tn", "Tn Shesh Ongko" & “Shi No Nai Basho”

== See also ==
- List of women writers
