= Anannya Literature Award =

Award for Literature in Bangladesh

- Awarded for: Excellence in Literature for Bangladesh
- Date: 1993
- Location: Dhaka
- Country: Bangladesh
- Presented by: Anannya Magazine
- Website: www.anannya.com.bd

Anannya Literature Award (Bengali: অনন্যা সাহিত্য পুরস্কার) is the prize for women in Bangladesh recognition of contribution to the field of literature by Anannya Magazine in every Bengali year since 1401 (Gregorian 1993).

== Winners ==
- 1401:Selina Hossain
- 1402: Rizia Rahman
- 1403: Nilima Ibrahim
- 1405:Dilara Hashem
- 1406: Rabeya Khatun
- 1407:Sanjida Khatun
- 1408: Jahanara Imam
- 1409: Nurjahan Begum
- 1410: Razia Khan Amin
- 1411: Ruby Rahman
- 1412: Anwara Syed Haq
- 1413: Purabi Basu
- 1414: Mokbula Manzoor
- 1415: Jharna Das Purkayastha
- 1416: Saleha Chowdhury
- 1417: Noorjahan Bose
- 1418: Maleka Begum
- 1419: Quazi Rosy
- 1420: Niaz Zaman
- 1421: Jahanara Naushin
- 1422: Sonia Nishat Amin
- 1423: Akhtar Kamal
- 1424: Begum Mushtari Shafi
- 1425: Akimun Rahman
- 1426: Nadira Majumder
- 1427: Jharna Rahman
- 1428: Ranjana Biswas
- 1429: Shahnaz Munni
- 1430: Afroza Parvin
- 1431: Nure Zannat & Nusrat Nusin
