= Aneek theatre group =

Indian Theatre

Aneek, established on 9 October 1999, is a group theatre based in Kolkata, India. Aneek celebrates its Silver Jubilee this year.

== Background ==
Aneek organises theatre festivals. From 1999 it has organised the international theatre festival Ganga Jamuna Natya Utsab which involves theatre groups from West Bengal, rest of India and other countries like Japan, Nepal, America and Germany. It also has organised an Inter-school and Inter-College drama Competition since 2003. From 2010, Aneek has organised the Bengali Short Drama Festival. A National Symposium, The Subaltern in Indian Theatre was organised on 13 and 14 November 2010 in collaboration with Department of English, University of Calcutta. In 2011, a festival was organised to commemorate the 150th birth anniversary of Rabindranath Tagore. Twenty five groups from all the 19 districts of West Bengal participated.

In 2012, a 2-day Symposium titled Rural problems & Indian Theatre was organised. The 14th Ganga Jamuna Natya utsab was held from 24 December 2011 to 4 January 2012 in Kolkata & Madhyamgram. Thirty two teams participated in the festival. The 15th Ganga Jamuna Natya Utsab was held from 23 December 2012 to 4 January 2013 in Kolkata & Madhyamgram. A National Symposium, 'Society, Nation & Rabindranath' was organised by Aneek aided by Ministry of Culture, Government of India on 23 and 24 June 2012 at Bharatiya Bhasha Parishad Auditorium, Kolkata. Eminent speakers from all over the country gave deliberations.

In September 2013, a six-day theatre festival "Ganga-Jamuna Natyautsab" was arranged by Ganga-Jamuna Natyautsab Parishad (Bangladesh Committee), in association with Aneek. The festival showcased a total of 17 plays from Bangladesh and one from India. Aneek staged "Prateek," at 7pm at the National Theatre Hall of BSA on the closing day. Leading troupes of Bangladesh like Aranyak, Dhaka Theatre, Loko Natya Dal, Prachyanat, Nagarik Natyangan and others staged their acclaimed plays in the event.

The 16th Ganga Jamuna Natya Utsab will be held from 22 December 2013 to 3 January 2014.

== Production of plays ==
- Haldi Nadeer Teeray
- Kremliner Ghari
- Ekjan Pratarak
- Lal Ghase Neel Ghora
- Sukh Chai Sukh
- Purna Apurna
- Samayer Abartey
- Adrisya Asukh
- Samparka
- Dwitiyo Basanta
- Punorujjiban
- Adventure Kare Kay
- Tapati
- Ekusher Golpo
- Prateek
- Chi-kissa
- Ashokananda
- Shakuntala

=== Short plays ===
- Halla Aschhe Bhago
- Samikkha
- Jallad
- Aap Ki Adalat
- Bangla Bnachao
- Feedgool
- Bikalpa (Audio Drama)
- Punorujjiban (Audio Drama)

=== Special productions ===
- Panta Akali
- Louha Manab
- Sarisrip
- Dalia

== Awards ==
- Lebedev Award (USSR): Best Production, Best Dramatist, Best Director
- Nurun Nahar Samad Natya Padak (Bangladesh): Best Production, Best Dramatist, Best Director
- West Bengal State Natya Academy Award-Amalesh Chakraborty (Script), Malay Biswas (Direction), Ajay Duttagupta (Stage design), Sunil Chatterjee (Actor), Tapati Bhattacherji (Actress)
