= Jyoti Prakash Dutta =

Jyoti Prakash Dutta may refer to:

- J. P. Dutta (born 1949), Indian film producer, writer and director
- Jyoti Prakash Dutta (writer), Bangladeshi short-story writer
