= Musa Ibrahim =

Bangladeshi mountaineer

- মুসা ইব্রাহীম
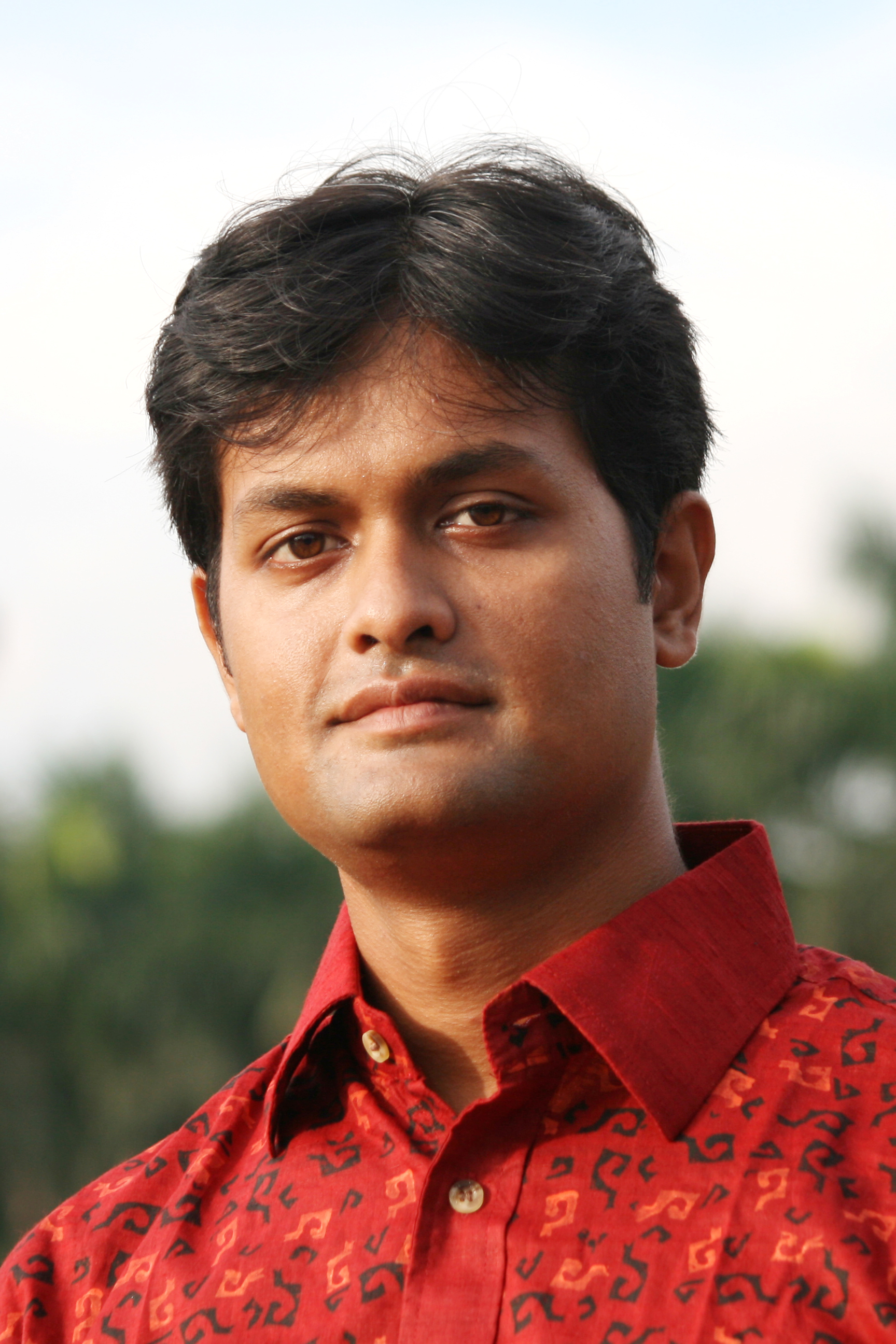
- Ibrahim in 2010
- Born: 1979 (age 46–47); Lalmonirhat, Bangladesh
- Education: University of Dhaka; BRAC University
- Occupation: Mountaineer/Journalist
- Known for: Being the first Bangladeshi to reach the top of Mount Everest.
- Spouse: Ummey Sharaban Tahura
- Children: Wasi Ibrahim Raiid
- Website: musaibrahim.com.bd

Musa Ibrahim (Bengali: মুসা ইব্রাহীম) is a Bangladeshi mountaineer, trekker, journalist, and author. Although he claims to be the first Bangladeshi to reach the summit of Mount Everest, all living Everest climbers dispute his claim. His summit was also not recognized by the Nepal Government. His own teammates, on other climbs have disputed his claims of climbing much shorter mountains. He claimed to have reached the summit around 5:05 am BST on 23 May 2010 and hoisted the flag of Bangladesh on the apex of the world at around 5:16 am BST.

Musa is the general secretary of North Alpine Club Bangladesh, a Bangladeshi mountaineering club and serves as special correspondent at Channel 24. He served as the sub-editor of The Daily Star. He founded the Everest Academy in 2011 for a wide participation of youth in mountaineering and adventure activities and founded Everest Foundation as well on 2012 for humanitarian and environmental development works.

== Biography ==
=== Early life ===
Musa was born in Bogra, in his maternal grandparents' house. His paternal grandparents house is in Gandhamarua (Basintari) village in Aditmari Upazila, Lalmonirhat. He was a student of Thakurgaon Sugar Mills High School. He passed Higher Secondary Certificate from Notre Dame College. He attained his Bachelor of Education (BEd) degree on science education and Master of Education (MEd) degree on educational evaluation and research from Institute of Education and Research (IER), University of Dhaka. He later earned a degree on disaster management from BRAC University.

=== Work and achievements ===
Musa Ibrahim is the first Bangladeshi citizen who climbed Mount Everest. He reached the peak on 23 May 2010 where he hoisted the national flag of Bangladesh. He used the North Alpine route on the Tibetan side to reach the highest peak of the world. Besides Musa, six Britons, three Montenegrins, an American and a Serbian were on the team. The China Tibet Mountaineering Association certified his climb. The certificate read "This is to certify that, on 23 May 2010 at 6.50 am Md Musa Ibrahim Bangladesh reached the top of the peak of Everest, Chomolungma of Mt. Everest."

Musa planned to organize Bangladesh-Russia friendship mountaineering to Mount Elbrus. This was declared at Russian Centre of Science And Culture, Dhaka. They hoisted the flags of Bangladesh, Russia and Kabardino-Balkaria Republic on Mount Elbrus. Dalhat Olmejhev, a resident of Kabardino-Balkaria Republic in Russia, guided them. The Ministry of Civil Aviation and Tourism, Bangladesh Tourism Board, Russian Embassy in Bangladesh and the sports and tourism ministries of Russia's Kabardino-Balkaria Republic aided the program.

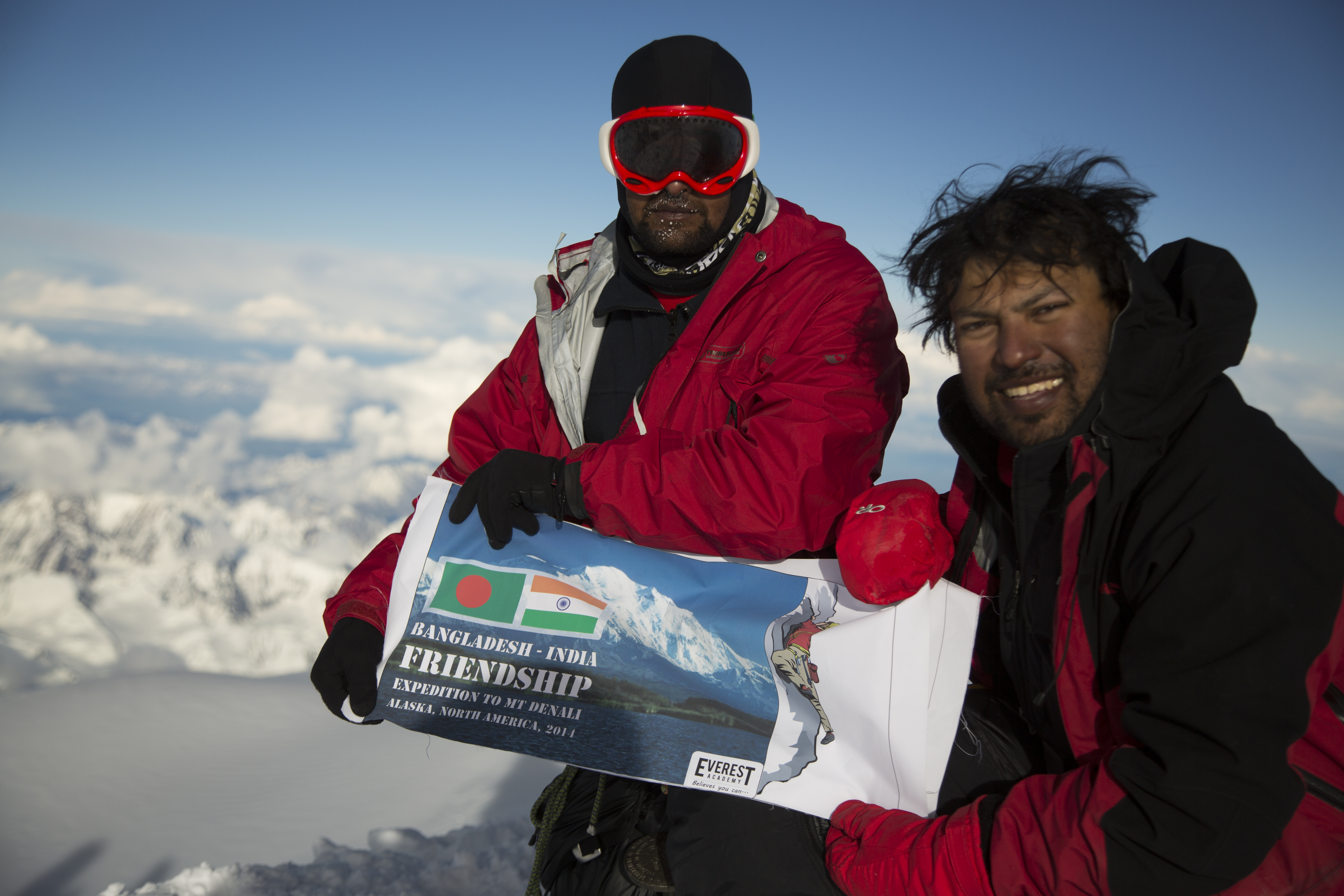
Musa with Satyarup Siddhanta in an Indo Bangladesh climb to improve the ties between the countries.

Musa and Satyarup Siddhanta of India planned to participate in an expedition titled 'First Bangladesh-India Friendship Expedition to Mount Denali' in the first week of June 2014. This was announced at a sole talk programme by Sattar at the Indira Gandhi Cultural Centre (IGCC) of the Indian High Commission in Dhaka on Thursday, says a press release. Indian Deputy High Commissioner Sandwip Chakravarty spoke at the function wishing success of the expedition.

== Controversy ==
Nepal Parbat, a list of the Mount Everest toppers published by the Nepal's Ministry of Tourism and the Nepal Mountaineering Association (NMA) did not include the name of Ibrahim. The list names MA Muhith and Nishat Majumdar as the first Bangladeshi male and female to have climbed Mount Everest successfully. MA Muhith and Nishat Majumdar also expressed doubts about Ibrahim's claims. However, Ibrahim said that there had been a conspiracy against him and NMA was influenced by the conspirator. The issue over the claim was moved to a court in Dhaka. O'Mahoney, who had followed Ibrahim towards the Everest summit, claimed that he saw him at the third step of the route, the last barrier to the Everest summit. However, by 27 May 2010, it was proven and became officially listed that Musa Ibrahim was indeed the first Bangladeshi to reach the top of Mount Everest.

== Mountaineering timeline ==
- 13 June 2017: Mount Carstensz Pyramid or Puncak Jaya (4884 metres/16023 feet) Summit. Musa Ibrahim reached the summit on 13 June 2017 with his team members Satyarup Siddhanta and Nandita Chandrashekhar.
- 23 June 2014: Denali or Mount McKinley (6,190 metres / 20,310 feet) Summit. Musa Ibrahim reached the summit on 23 June 2014 with Christopher Manning (Canada) as team leader while Satyarup Siddhanta (India), Susmita Maskey (Nepal) and Ryan Francois (USA) as team members.
- 26 June 2013: Mount Elbrus (5,642 metres /18,506 feet) Summit. Musa Ibrahim reached the summit on 26 June 2013 with Niaz Patwary and Sifat Fahmida Nawshin and Dalhat Olmejhev, a resident of Kabardino-Balkaria Republic in Russia, guided them.
- 13 September 2011: Mount Kilimanjaro (5,885 metres/19,308 feet) Summit. Musa reached the summit on 13 September 2011, with his team member Niaz Morshed Patwary.
- 23 May 2010: Everest (8,848 m/29,029 ft) Summit Musa Ibrahim reached "the summit of the Mount Everest through North Route, Tibet, China on 23 May 2010."
- 14 June 2009: Annapurna IV (7,525 m/24,682 ft) Summit
- 1 December 2008: Langsisa Ri (6,310 m/20,700 ft) Summit.
- May 2007: Chulu West (6,419 m/21054 ft) Ascent up to 18,500 ft
- May 2006: Frey Peak (5,831 m/19125 ft) Summit
- September 2005: Advanced Mountaineering Training from Himalayan Mountaineering Institute, Darjeeling, India (5,335 m/17,500 ft) Finished training successfully
- May 2005: Mera Peak (6,654 m/21,825 ft) Ascent up to 18,500 ft
- 10–23 May 2004: Everest Base Camp (EBC) Trail (5,335 m/17,500 ft) Trekked successfully
- April 2004: Basic Mountaineering Training from Himalayan Mountaineering Institute, (4,878 m/16,000 ft) Finished training successfully.
- 8–16 April 2002: Annapurna Trail (3,800 m/12,464 ft) Ascent Muktinath
- September 2000: Keocradong Hill (967 m/3,172 ft) Trekked to the top successfully.

== See also ==
- List of Bangladeshi summiteers of Mount Everest
