= Wasfia Nazreen =

Bangladeshi mountain climber

- ওয়াসফিয়া নাজরীন
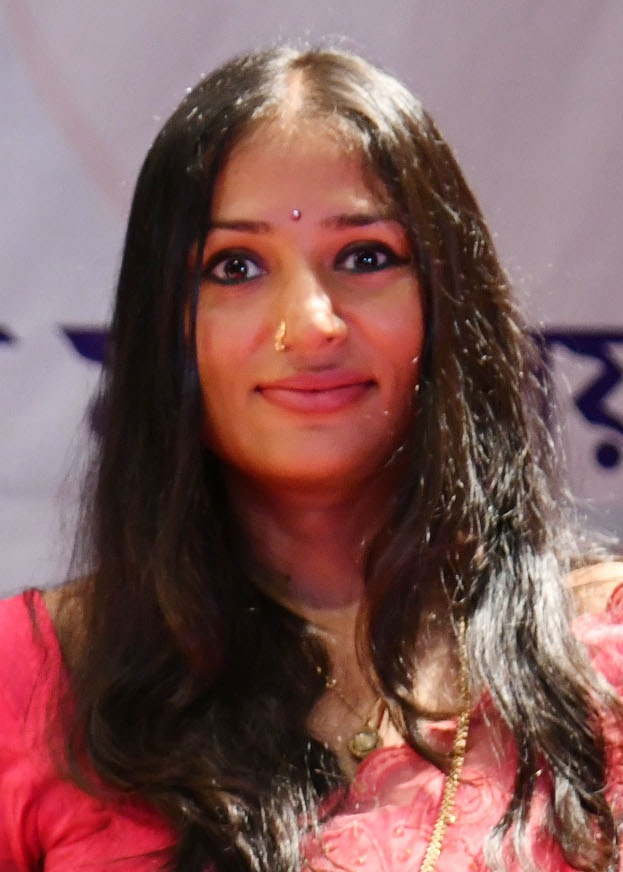
- Wasfia Nazreen in 2022
- Born: 27 October 1982 (age 44); Dhaka, Bangladesh
- Education: Samye Ling; Agnes Scott College; Edinburgh Napier University; Prachyanat, Scholastica
- Occupations: Explorer, Mountaineer, Storeyteller, Social worker, environmentalist, activist, Film Producer
- Known for: K2; Mount Everest; Seven Summits
- Awards: National Geographic Explorer, National Geographic Adventurer of the Year 2014, National Geographic Explorers' Symposium People's Choice Award, Anannya Top Ten Awards 2015
- Website: wasfianazreen.com

Wasfia Nazreen (Bengali: ওয়াসফিয়া নাজরীন born 27 October 1982) is a Bangladeshi mountaineer, activist, social worker and environmentalist.

Nazreen is the first Bengali and Bangladeshi to scale K2, the world's second highest and most dangerous peak becoming one of the 40 women in history since 1954 to have successfully scaled K2.

Nazreen earlier became the first Bangladeshi and first Bengali to complete the Seven Summits (Reinhold Messner's list) on 18 November 2015. Nazreen dedicated her 2012 Mount Everest climb to the women of Bangladesh, saying: "We have achieved independence 41 years ago, but our women are yet to enjoy freedom."

National Geographic recognized Nazreen as one of their Adventurers of the Year 2014/2015. She was selected in honor of her activism and commitment to empowering women through her work in the field of adventure. She was again selected as one of their Explorers in 2016, becoming the only woman to hold the simultaneous titles of National Geographic Explorer and Adventurer.

Nazreen is credited in Bangladesh history as the nation's inspiration and one of the legendary women to have made a pioneering contribution. Nazreen is also known for her campaigns to raise awareness of animal rights, human rights situations in Tibet, environmental impacts, Bangladeshi women's rights: including sex workers and garment factory workers, Sherpa people and other high-altitude workers' rights, and Indigenous groups. In 2011, Nazreen testified at the 10th session of UNPFII: United Nations Permanent Forum on Indigenous Issues, against the continued oppression and land-grabbing of Adibashis, or indigenous people of Bangladesh, by people of her own ethnicity.

In 2023, Nazreen was invited by the government of France and Paris Organising Committee for the 2024 Olympic and Paralympic Games as one of the first cohorts of athletes to be decorated in the Hall of Fame for Paris 2024. In 2021, Nazreen was one of the activists to launch UNESCO's worldwide Forum on Biodiversity. In 2019, Nazreen was featured in UN Women's "Generation Equality" campaign.

In 2018, Nazreen's efforts were monumental in leading and garnering international support for the Free Shahidul campaign. One of Nazreen's mentors and Bangladesh's highly decorated photojournalist Dr. Shahidul Alam was picked up by pain-clothed men shortly after giving an interview to Al Jazeera that criticized the government's violent response to the 2018 Bangladesh road safety protests. Amongst other feats during Dr. Alam's months-long imprisonment, Nazreen flew a plane with a banner message "Free our Teachers" circling around the sky of Manhattan, New York City, for one and half hours calling for press freedom in Bangladesh and beyond, while the UN was holding a General Assembly and the PM of Bangladesh was inside the building.

In 2016 and 2017, Nazreen was named by Outside as one of 40 women in the last 40 years who have advanced and challenged the outdoor world through their leadership, innovation, and athletic feats, and by Men's Journal as one of the 25 most adventurous women of the past 25 years.

== Early life and education ==
=== Early years ===
Nazreen was born in Dhaka and named Wasfia Nazreen Chowdhury by her family. She is the youngest child and only daughter of Mahmuda Nahar (Ruby), a musician and teacher, and Nazmee Jahan Chowdhury, an executive at James Finlay Bangladesh. Nazreen lived in Khulna, where she studied at Sunflower Nursery School and afterwards at Coronation Girls' High School. When she was still a child, the family moved to their previous home in Chittagong. There she studied at Bangladesh Mahila Samiti Girls' High School (BWA).

Nazreen credits her childhood as the most traumatic and impactful time of her life. Nazreen was trained in classical music and dance as a young child but discontinued practice after her mother, who was also her first teacher, left the family.

=== Early education ===
Nazreen was only thirteen when her parents officially divorced and she was sent off to live with her aunt, Chobi Rouf, and uncle, NAT Rouf, in Dhaka, the capital of Bangladesh, where she was enrolled in the English-medium Scholastica school. From this point, she was separated from both her parents as well as her elder brother, who stayed in Chittagong with their father.

In high school, Nazreen competed in volleyball and handball and was under detention for a long time, as a result of bunking academic classes to play. Nazreen also attempted to run away on several occasions, starting from the age of 14. Nazreen earned a diploma in theatre from Bangladesh's Prachyanat School of Acting and Design. She worked in three big productions as an assistant director to Azad Abul Kalam and alongside Rahul Anand and several other members of the band Joler Gaan. She acted as Juliet in Romeo and Juliet in high school directed and performed by the same cast.

=== College ===
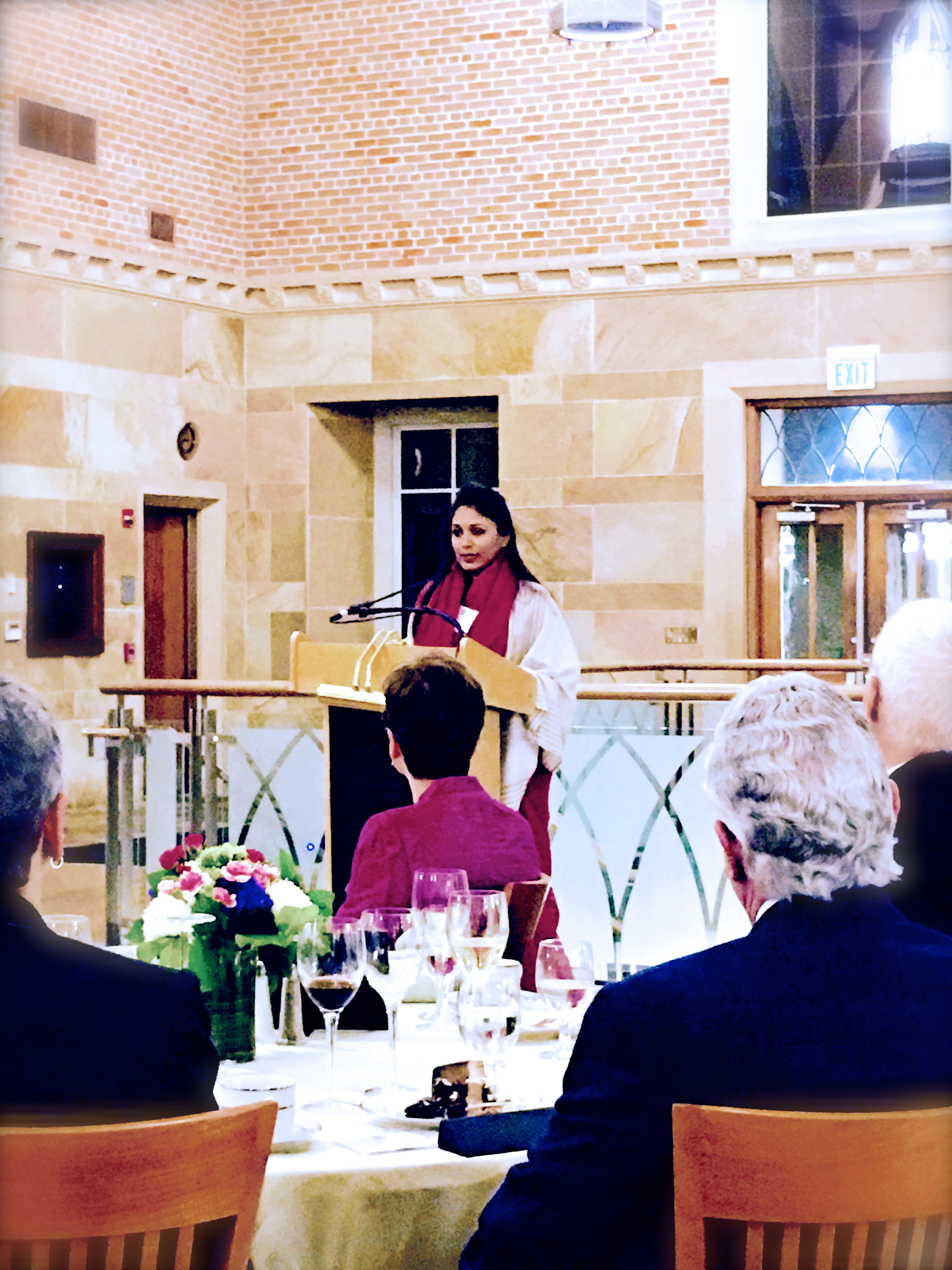
Nazreen addressing her college upon acceptance of Outstanding Young Alumna Award from her alma mater Agnes Scott College, Atlanta, Georgia, April 2016.

Nazreen went to the United States for college on her own, and at this time, she removed her family last name from all official papers.

She pursued education and received a scholarship to Agnes Scott College (ASC), a private women's college in Decatur, Georgia. Nazreen left Bangladesh with the intention to pursue a double major in Theatre and Aeronautical Science. In her first semester, Nazreen played in her university's volleyball team and toured for the NCAA (National Collegiate Athletic Association), but she dropped volleyball in third year, when she struggled with her academic grades. By her second year, she switched to double majoring in Studio Art and Social Psychology.

Nazreen worked many odd jobs during this time to support her education. Outside the university, Nazreen was involved with African Dance Theatre part-time. While still in college, Nazreen received a grant to go to India and research how women were using art as therapy. In Dharamsala, she started working with Tibetan women who had experienced torture while detained in Chinese prisons. She describes it as a "life-altering experience" for her where "forgiving your enemies and really embodying that principle in your day-to-day life" was something that was very new to her. Following graduation, she decided to quit her work in the United States and moved to the Himalayas to work with refugees.

For post-graduate studies, Nazreen was a distant scholar at Samye Ling College of Scotland and pursued a Nangi Shedra in Indo-Tibetan Buddhism.

== Career ==
In 2016, Nazreen became the brand ambassador for Grameenphone, becoming the highest paid female athlete of Bangladesh and one of the highest paid athletes of the nation. During her two-year contract with Bangladesh's largest telecommunications network, she used the platform to challenge social responsibility and holistic development of the society through Grameenphone's various social initiatives like online schools, easy internet education for the common people, women empowerment and other development initiatives.

Nazreen represented Bangladesh in Nepal at the closing ceremony of the two Nation's first ever Business Forum in January 2016. Nazreen highlighted the power of youth and the importance of sustainability and respecting nature while developing infrastructure. The conference was closed with a recitation of her poem, written in Nepali, about the ancient connection of the rivers that connect her motherland Bangladesh with the Himalayas.

In 2012, Nazreen was chosen as the first Goodwill Ambassador of BRAC (NGO), an international development organization. Since 2011, Nazreen was also the youth ambassador for JAAGO Foundation and its concern Volunteer for Bangladesh. In 2011, Nazreen was part of the Indigenous Peoples delegates at the United Nations Permanent Forum on Indigenous Issues (UNPFII). She is part of the Save Sundarbans movement, and was a critical voice to pressure the GOB and other concerned bodies in cleaning up efforts following the disastrous oil-spill of 2013/4.

Before leaving her development career, Nazreen was employed by CARE. However, when the funding for one of CARE's long-time projects ceased, Nazreen believed that it was crucial for the Bangladeshi people to establish their aid organizations, rather than rely solely on foreign assistance. Although foreign aid had a role to play in the nation's development, she felt it was time for a change. While working in Tibet to combat human rights violations by the Chinese government, Nazreen discovered her interest in mountaineering.

After finishing climbing the seven summits, Nazreen started her own foundation Ösel Foundation, which she describes as an "educational institute set in the outdoors, which integrates the latest scientific findings about the development of the mind and combines it with mindfulness techniques and training in nature to empower adolescent girls."

=== Free Tibet ===
Her work with Tibetan human rights took her to Dharamsala, Himachal Pradesh, the exiled-capital of the Tibetans, where she lived for several years in her early twenties. Since 2007, Nazreen has been banned from returning to Tibet by the Chinese government after she was found with a photo of the 14th Dalai Lama.

Nazreen was part of the international movement for greater freedom and better human rights conditions inside Tibet and some high-profile protests and uprisings, leading up to the 2008 Beijing Olympic Games, including the March to Tibet protest in solidarity with 2008 Tibetan Uprising and several concerts and other events throughout the globe.

She was also an active member of Students for a Free Tibet (SFT) and the National Director of SFT in Bangladesh.

In 2009, with pressure from the Chinese Embassy in Bangladesh, her photography exhibition titled "Into Exile: Tibet 1949-2009" in partnership with DRIK, was shut down in Dhaka. The exhibition was still shown online while riot-geared police barricaded the premises and audience waited in the streets and consequently, she was intimidated and harassed for months by authorities and intelligence in her country.

=== Free Shahidul Alam ===
In 2018, Nazreen was a vocal activist in the international "Free Shahidul" campaign to free the renown jailed Bangladeshi journalist Dr. Shahidul Alam. One of the protests outside the Headquarters of the UN that she had organized were met by violent thugs and opposition. Nazreen managed to get a permit the following day and flew a plane carrying a message that had an image of Shahidul reading "#FreeShahidulAlam", as well as a text banner saying "Free Our Teachers #Bangladesh #UNGA" in New York City skyline, traversing the Statue of Liberty, while the United Nations General Assembly was in effect. This followed a weekend of demonstrations and talks held at various parts of the city calling for greater press freedom in Bangladesh, particularly addressing the case of Shahidul, who was picked up by plainclothes men in Dhaka, and sent to jail in a case filed under the ICT Act.

== Historic climbs ==
=== K2 ===
In July 2022, Nazreen became the first Bangladeshi to scale Pakistan's notorious K2, the world's second highest mountain.

She made a direct push from camp 3, skipping camp 4 and reached the summit at 8:55 AM local Gilgit-Baltistan time, with Mingma Sherpa and descended the mountain in a daring two-day push, with Nirmal Purja, popularly known as Nimsdai, the record shattering mountaineer and Gurkha soldier behind the movie 14 Peaks: Nothing Is Impossible. Upon arrival back to Kathmandu with her climbing team, Nazreen said in the Good Morning Nepal show, that Sherpa people and high-altitude Nepali climbers and workers of other ethnicities, are the "backbone" of any Himalayan or Karakoram climb. She also thanked the porters and other local staff of the Karakoram, alongside all Pakistani authorities who made the expedition possible, and for all the love and solidarity she received from Pakistani people.

She had initially planned to summit K2 in 2021 coinciding with the celebration of the 50 years of Bangladesh's independence, but she had to postpone due to COVID-19 restrictions.

=== Seven Summits ===
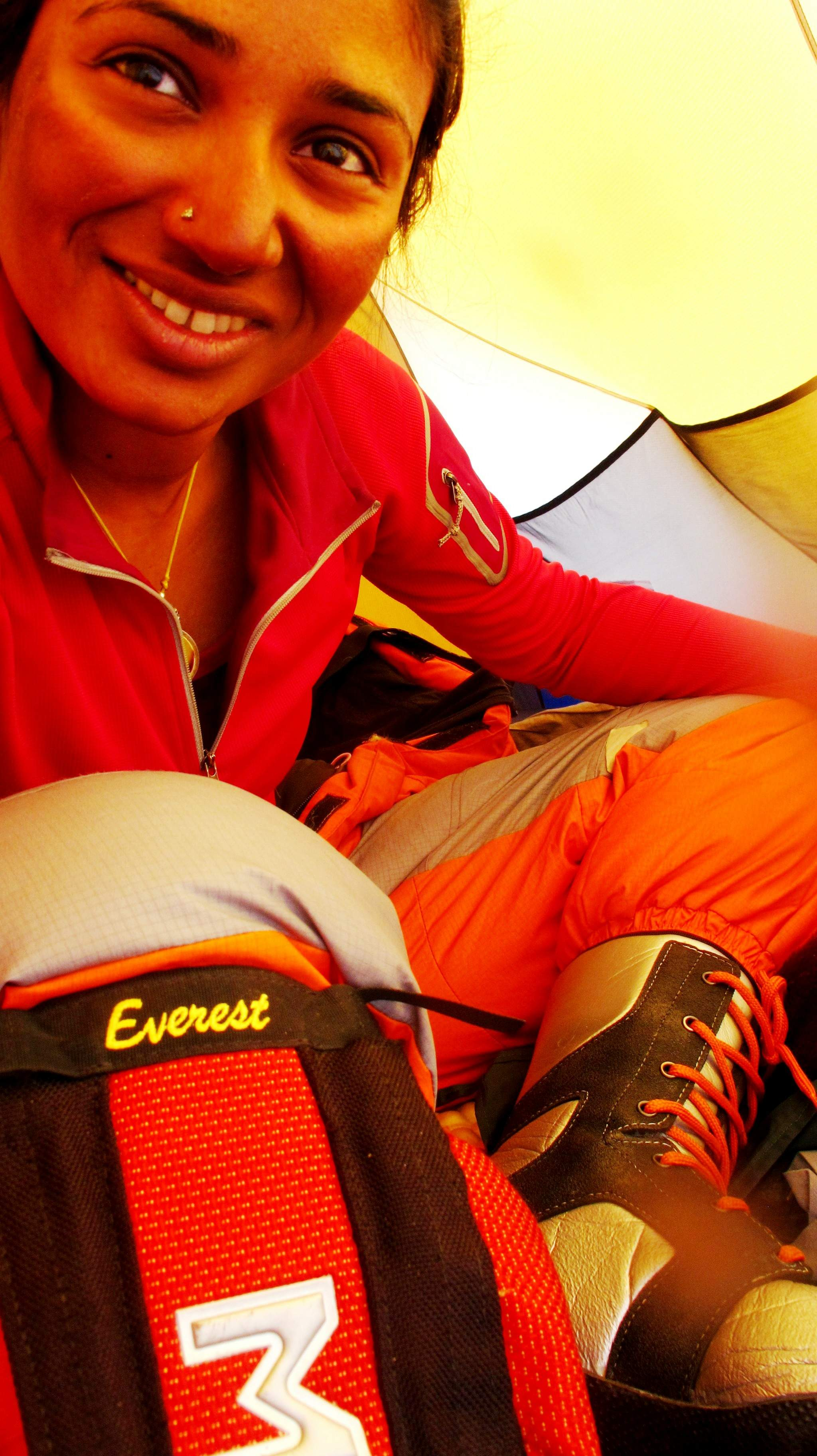
An exhausted Nazreen in her tent during her 2012 Everest climb.

On 26 March 2011, to celebrate 40 years of Bangladeshi independence, Nazreen launched the "Bangladesh on Seven Summits" Campaign. For the campaign, she has climbed each of the seven continental summits to mark 40 years of women's progress in Bangladesh. The campaign received widespread support from the mass and was run completely independent of any political support, contrary to various claims made in the media by a number of ministers in the Bangladesh government. Among notable civilians, cricketers from the Bangladesh national team supported by advocating in their own rights; most outspokenly, Shakib Al Hasan, world's number one all-rounder and Mashrafe Mortaza, the captain of the Bangladesh national cricket team.

Many other notable individuals, including Sir Fazle Hasan Abed, Professor Muhammad Yunus, and the 14th Dalai Lama, were her outspoken supporters throughout the campaign.

Nazreen started trekking to base-camp of Everest on 26 March 2012 to mark Bangladesh's Independence day.

On 18 November 2015, Nazreen reached the summit of Carstensz Pyramid, the summit of Oceania, completing a four years long journey to the Seven Summits. She became the first Bangladeshi and first Bengali in the world to do so. She dedicated it to the "Spirit of 1971 Liberation War of Bangladesh and all those who are fighting to protect it." Nazreen dedicated her successful Everest climb to the women of Bangladesh, saying: "We have achieved independence 41 years ago, but our women are yet to enjoy freedom".

Nazreen became the first Bangladeshi to summit Aconcagua, South America's highest peak and the highest peak outside of Asia. She is also the first Bangladeshi to summit Denali, North America's highest peak, Mt.Elbrus, Europe's highest mountain, Vinson Massif, Antarctica's highest mountain and Carstensz Pyramid, Oceania's highest mountain. Nazreen has several more mountains and volcanoes under her belt which she summited as a first Bangladeshi.

Patrick Morrow, the first person in the world to have climbed the highest peaks of all seven continents (in accordance with the Messner list) has overseen her training for seven summits.

Nazreen was invited by the House of Commons in UK Parliament in 2014 to share her journeys with the British Member of Parliaments.

== Personal ==
According to a March 2025 instagram post by Nazreen, her brother "Tasneem Selim passed away after a long battle with illness at 45 years young" when Nazreen was taking care of him.

Nazreen is dubbed in Bangladeshi media as a fashion icon and role-model. She is vegan and an advocate of animal-rights. She currently lives in Los Angeles and has often been quoted to say she shies away from social-media and the spotlight.

Nazreen has had deep connections with many master teachers in the Tibetan traditions spanning across Tibet, Bhutan, Nepal and India and was given the name Karma Ösel Lhamo by the Karmapa, which roughly translates as Goddess of luminous actions. When Nazreen went to the United States for college on her own at the age of 18–19, she removed her biological family last name from all official papers. In close circles, she is referred as Dalaidhita, implying daughter of the Dalai Lama. A long-time supporter of Tibet, Nazreen is close friends with the 14th Dalai Lama, Tenzin Gyatso, Dilgo Khyentse Rinpoche and the 17th Karmapa Ogyen Trinley Dorje. She credits them in interviews as the three most important teachers in life who has shown her the way when she was derailed in life. She studied meditation with Tibetan teachers Dilgo Khyentse Yangsi Rinpoche and Yongey Mingyur Rinpoche.

Life is meditation–it's not a separate thing. The essence of meditation is recognizing awareness. If we're not aware, we cease to exist. Yoga, meditation, mindfulness—these are like compasses when we're lost at sea. Thanks to my mother, I was born into yoga. And then later in my adult life I have been extremely blessed not only to be directly guided by some of the most profound teachers of our times, but also to work in movements and environments led by HH the Dalai Lama and HH the Karmapa, and experientially learn how great beings like them who also went through so much atrocities in their personal lives—deal with it all, behind the limelight. Whenever I have (in the past) got derailed somehow, they've pulled me out, often in miraculous ways. So having this circle of family, and the particular purpose I have–I'm really blessed and I wouldn't in my awakened mind for a second want to imagine it any other way.

Nazreen openly discusses accounts of dealing with depression and trauma as a child following her parents divorce that made her homeless as a result. She credits such struggle at early life for giving her "abilities to bounce back after adversities and greet change and difficulties as an opportunity to welcome greater self-reflection, learning, and growth."

Nazreen was diagnosed with COVID-19 and pneumonia in March 2020 and almost died. Her recovery back to health took 18 months, during which, she used her platform to send positive messages and advocated for mental health, by going on podcasts and live shows with notable personalities such as cricketers, actors and astronauts. She was one of the first Bangladeshis to have gotten diagnosed while being abroad.

=== Relationship with nature ===
Nazreen is often quoted in TV and other media requesting against labeling her mountaineering expeditions as a "conquering" feat due to its colonial and patriarchal nature. She has linked her outdoor work to broader climate and environmental awareness, encouraging sustainable engagement with nature and collective responsibility for planetary health.

In 2020, in the Bruce Lee Podcast, she stressed about the importance of mental-health and ancestral trauma healing, and how individual mental-health is directly linked with the health of our planet.

== Wasfia in books and documentary ==
- Nazreen is one of the historic characters featured in the song "Ami Bangladesh" by Bengali hip-hop musician Towfique. The song was also televised in commercials during 2015 ICC matches as a soundtrack for Bangladesh Cricket team.
- The Attempted Band's rendition of the famous Bengali song Shongkolpo by rebel poet Kazi Nazrul Islam was dedicated to Wasfia Nazreen.
- Nazreen's philosophy of life is featured among five of the most adventurous souls in National Geographic's Special Publication "Adventures of a Lifetime."
- Nazreen and her quests are subjects of HSC exam quizzes and various other school textbook contents in Bangladesh.
- Nazreen is the subject of the 2016 documentary Wasfia made by Apple Inc. and produced by Academy Awards nominated RYOT Films. The documentary was shot on the iPhone 6s and premiered at the Telluride Mountainfilm festival same year. The documentary was on tour around the world and was shown as part of the National Geographic Short film Showcase. It received critical acclaim internationally, including a nomination for the Tribeca-X award at the 2017 Tribeca Film Festival and The New York Times calling it a bait for the Academy Awards.
- Nazreen is one of the subjects in Astronaut Ronald J. Garan Jr.'s book The Orbital Perspective. "What really struck me in Wasfia's description of her experience was that overriding feeling of gratitude, which in some way connected her to every single being. This was exactly what I experienced in space: immense gratitude for the opportunity to see Earth from this vantage, and for the gift of the planet we've been given. In some way I can't explain, being physically detached from Earth made me feel deeply interconnected with everyone on it. I distinctly remember this feeling of profound thankfulness, but Wasfia's words helped me to process that awareness of interconnectedness with the inhabitants of the planet."

== Awards and honors ==
- Prime Minister of Bangladesh Sheikh Hasina's National Honor, 2012
- Former PM and Opposition Party Leader of Bangladesh Khaleda Zia's Honor, 2012
- Nobel Peace Prize Recipient Muhammad Yunus's Honor, 2012
- Female Pioneer Award by Prime Minister's Office, Bangladesh, 2013
- National Geographic Adventurer of the Year, 2014
- The Mayor's Medal of Honor, by Councillor of London Borough of Hounslow - first to be given to any female civilian, 2014
- Pioneer Athlete, Global Sports Mentoring Program, U.S. State Department and espnW, 2014
- Anannya Top Ten Awards, 2015
- Sri Chinmoy Torch Bearer award - for her commitment to non-violence strategic campaigns, 2015
- Outstanding Young Alumna Award, Agnes Scott College, 2016
- The Meeto Memorial Award for Young South Asians by SANGAT (South Asian Feminist Network) - in recognition of her commitment to communal harmony, peace, justice, and human rights, 2016
- National Geographic Explorer, 2016
- Inspiring Woman of the Nation by Bangladesh Brand Forum, 2016
- Amelia Earheart Memorial Award by Zonta Bangladesh, 2016
- Icon of Bangladesh by Dhaka Chamber of Commerce and Industry, 2016
- People's Choice Award, National Geographic Explorers Symposium, 2016
- Young Global Leader, 2019 (unaccepted)
- State Minister's Honor, Ministry of Youth and Sports, Bangladesh, 2022

== See also ==
- List of Bangladeshi summiteers of Mount Everest
