= Maleka Begum =

Bangladeshi academic

- মালেকা বেগম
- Born: 1944 (age 81–82)
- Occupation: Academic
- Spouse: Matiur Rahman

Academic background
- Education: University of Dhaka

Maleka Begum (born 1944) is a Bangladeshi feminist, author, academic.

== Biography ==
Begum was born in 1944 to Abdul Aziz and Fahima Begum.

Begum completed her secondary education from Sher-E-Bangla Girls' High School. She earned her B.A. and M.A. from University of Dhaka in Bengali literature and Sociology in 1965 and 1966 and in 1968 (sociology).

Begum teaches at Central Women's University and is a visiting faculty of Department of Women and Gender Studies at the University of Dhaka.

Begum is one of the founding general secretaries of Bangladesh Mahila Parishad.

== Writings ==
Maleka Begum has written over 30 books on women and gender issues. Some of the books are:

- Ela Mitra
- Five decades of women movement
- Women in Liberation War
- Not like Women
- Subhra Sommujal
- Reserve Women Seat: Direct Election
- Wife of Surya Sen, Puspakuntala and Revolutionary Women in Chittagong
- Endangered Women
- Culture of Dowry

== Awards ==
Begum won Anannya Literature Award in 2012.
