= Afroza Parvin =

Bangladeshi writer (born 1957)

- আফরোজা পারভীন
- Born: 4 February 1957 (age 69); Narail, Bangladesh
- Education: University of Dhaka
- Occupations: Author; journalist
- Writing career
- Language: Bengali
- Subjects: fiction, non-fiction, drama, editing, journalism
- Notable awards: Bangla Academy Literary Award (2023)

Afroza Parvin (Bengali: আফরোজা পারভীন; born 14 February 1957) is a Bangladeshi journalist and writer whose work includes fiction, non-fiction, drama and editing. She was the recipient of the 2023 Bangla Academy Literary Award for research on Bangladesh Liberation War.

Parvin also the editor of Roktobij.

== Early life and education ==
Parvin was born on 4 February 1957 in Narail District of Bangladesh. She is an alumnus of University of Dhaka.

== Books ==
- Potaka Hate Khude Jodda
- Joddo Seser Kabbo

== Awards ==
Year	Award	Result	Ref
2023	Bangla Academy Literary Award	Won	
2023	Anannya Literature Award	Won	
2022	Begum Rokeya Padak	Won	
