= Jharna Rahman =

Bangladeshi writer (born 1959)

- ঝর্ণা রহমান
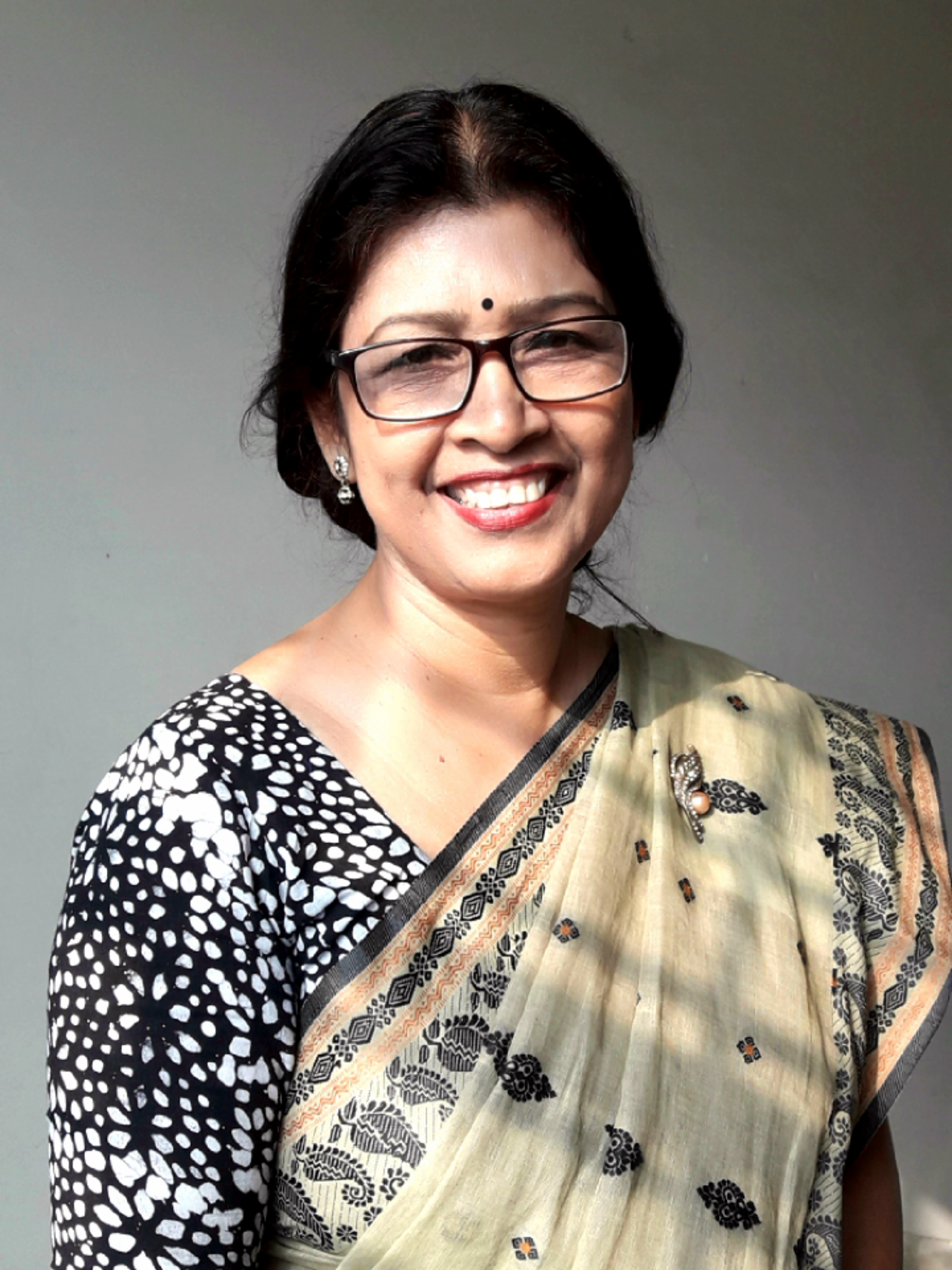
- Born: 28 June 1959 (age 66); Dacca, East Pakistan, Pakistan (now Dhaka, Bangladesh)
- Occupation: Writer

Jharna Rahman (born 28 June 1959) is a Bangladeshi writer specialising in short stories, novels, travelogues, essays, non-fiction, and children's books. She was awarded 2021 Bangla Academy Literary Award and 1427 Anannya Literature Award. As of 2021, she has written a total 60 books including Ognita, Shorbotorbari, Perek, Chondrodohon, and Adritar Potaka.

== Background and career ==
Jharna Rahman was born in Dacca, East Pakistan, Pakistan (now Dhaka, Bangladesh) on 28 June 1959 to Md. Mofazzal Hossain and Rahima Begum. She is a faculty member at the Bir Shreshtha Noor Mohammad Public College.

Rahman released Jolpori Onuher Nouka and Juddhodiner Nil Khata in February 2021.
