= Noorjahan Bose =

Bangladeshi writer and women's rights activist

- নুরজাহান বোস
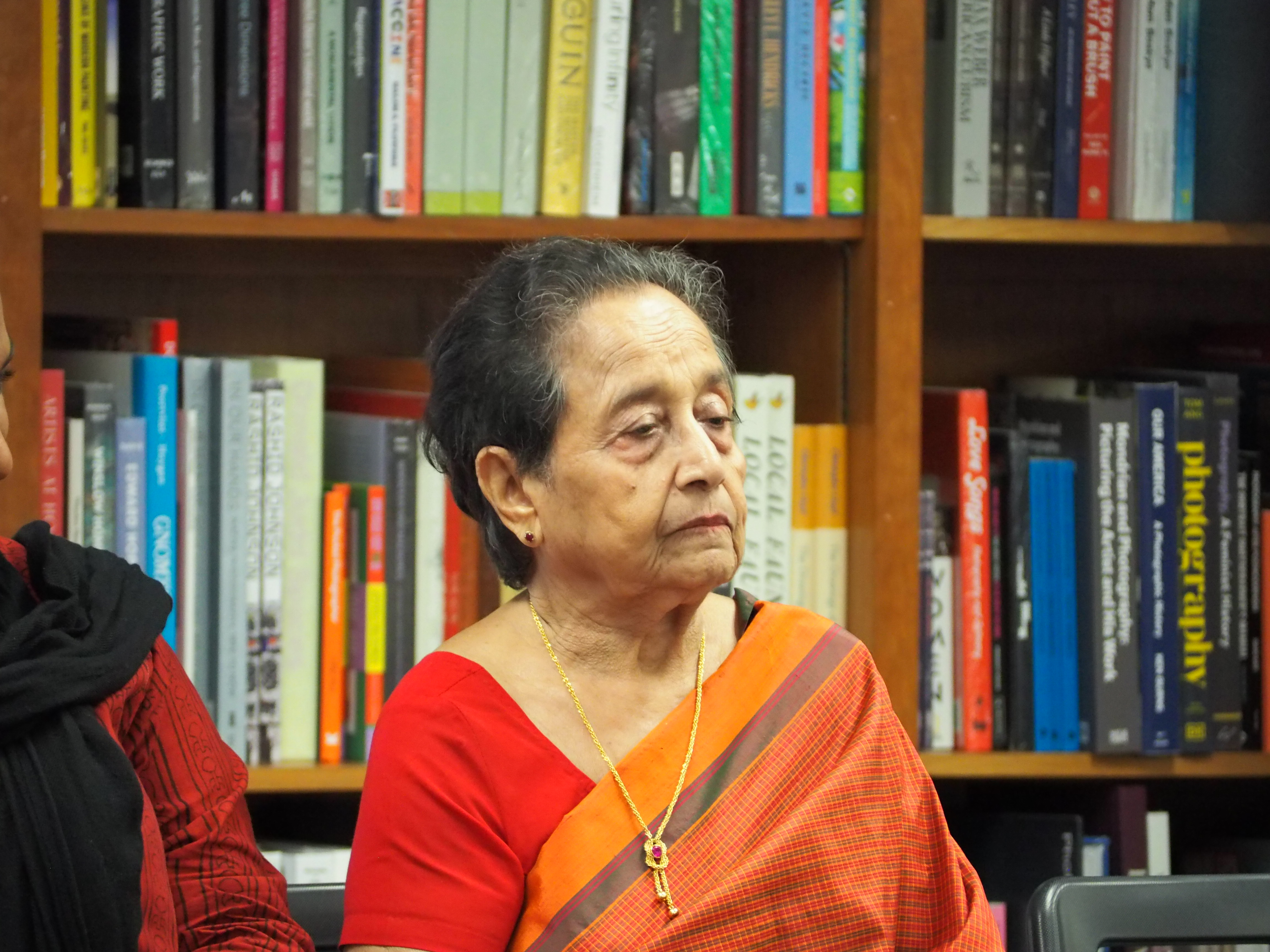
- Born: 14 March 1938 (age 87); Kantakhali, Boro Baishdia, Galachipa, Patuakhali, Bengal Presidency, British India
- Spouse(s): Emadullah Swadesh Bose (m. 1963; died 2009)
- Awards: Anannya Top Ten Awards (2005)

Noorjahan Bose (born 14 March 1938) is a Bangladeshi writer and women's rights activist. She won Bangla Academy Literary Award in the autobiography category in 2016. She founded Asha and Samhati – nonprofit organizations focusing on women's empowerment.

== Background and family ==
Bose was born in Katakhali village at Boro Baishdia, an island in the Bay of Bengal, 14 March 1938. She went to Barisal to finish her matriculation exam. At 17, she married Emadullah, the general secretary of East Pakistan Jubo League. Emadullah died from smallpox in a year while she was pregnant. After the birth of her first child, Jaseem, she took a job as a dorm warden at Shadar Girls School, from which she had graduated.

In 1963, she married her late husband's closest friend, Swadesh Bose. The couple and Jaseem went to Cambridge, England as Swadesh was awarded scholarship for his Ph.D. at Cambridge University. In 1967 they moved to Karachi. Noorjahan gave birth to a daughter Monica in Cambridge, and a second daughter, Anita, in Karachi. The family moved to Dhaka in early 1971, just before the start of the liberation war.

In 1974, the family moved to Oxford, England and from there to the Washington, United States where Swadesh got a job with the World Bank. Noorjahan completed her master's degree in social work and began her career as a social worker with a Catholic Charities Refugee Program.

In 1984, Noorjahan Bose founded Samhati.

== Awards ==
- Anannya Top Ten Awards (2005)
- Ananya Literature Award (2010)
- Bangla Academy Literary Award (2016)

== Works ==
- Agunmukhar Meye, Sahitya, Dhaka, 2009
- Bose, Noorjahan (2023-08-03). Daughter of the Agunmukha. London: Oxford University Press. ISBN 978-1-80526-060-8.
