= Nishat Majumdar =

Bangladeshi mountain climber

Nishat Mazumdar
- নিশাত মজুমদার
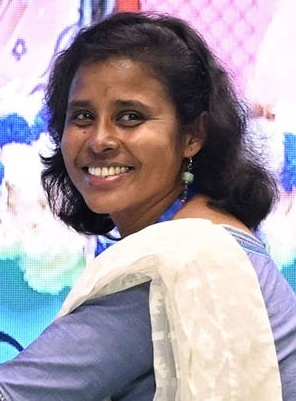
- Majumdar in 2023
- Born: 5 January 1981 (age 45); Ramganj, Lakshmipur, Chittagong, Bangladesh
- Education: Dhaka City College
- Occupations: Chief Accounts Officer, Dhaka WASA
- Known for: Mountaineering
- Spouse: Rafikul Islam
- Awards: Anannya Top Ten Awards (2008)

Nishat Mazumdar (born 5 January 1981) became the first Bangladeshi woman to scale Mount Everest,. She reached the northern side of the mountain with the team on 19 May 2012, six days before Bangladeshi mountaineer Wasfia Nazreen reached the summit from the Nepal side.

== Early life and education ==
Mazumdar was born on 5 January 1981 in Ramganj, Noakhali District (now in Lakshmipur District). Nishat was the second out of the four children of Abdul Mannan Majumdar and Ashura Majumdar. She completed her Secondary School Certificate (SSC) from Botmuli Home High Girls' School in 1997 and Higher Secondary Certificate (HSC) from Shaheed Anwar Girls' College in 1999. Later she earned both her bachelor's and master's degrees in accounting from Dhaka City College.

== Climbing ==
Mazumdar prepared for ten years before attempting to climb Everest. She joined the Bangladesh Mountaineering and Trekking Club (BMTC) in 2003 and participated in expeditions with the organization. She received official training in 2007 at the Darjeeling Mountaineering Club in India.

Before becoming the first Bangladeshi woman to reach Mount Everest Nishat took part in several mountaineering expeditions.

In 2003, during 50th anniversary of first ascent of Everest, she climbed Keokradong(3,172 feet), then considered Bangladesh's third-highest peak, in an expedition organized by Bangladesh Astronomical Association. In March 2006, she climbed Keokradong again with a women's expedition team organized by BMTC to mark International Women's Day.

In September 2006, she joined a women's team organized by BMTC for a trek to Everest Base Camp (17,500 feet). To prepare for higher climbs, she completed basic mountaineering training at Himalayan Mountaineering Institute in May 2007. Later that year in September she successfully climbed Mera Peak (21,830 feet) in the Himalayas.

As part of her Everest preparation she climbed Singu Chuli (21,328 feet) in May 2008. In September of the same year she joined a joint Bangladesh–India expedition to Gangotri (21,000 feet).

In April 2009, Nishat participated in a joint Bangladesh–India expedition to Makalu (27,865 feet). In October of the following year she also successfully joined an expedition to a Himalayan peak called Chekigo.

== Career ==
She works as the Chief Accounts Officer at Dhaka WASA. She is also a trainer and mentor for several Bangladeshi women mountaineers, including Tahura Sultana.

== Personal life ==
Nishat is married to Rafikul Islam.

== Awards ==
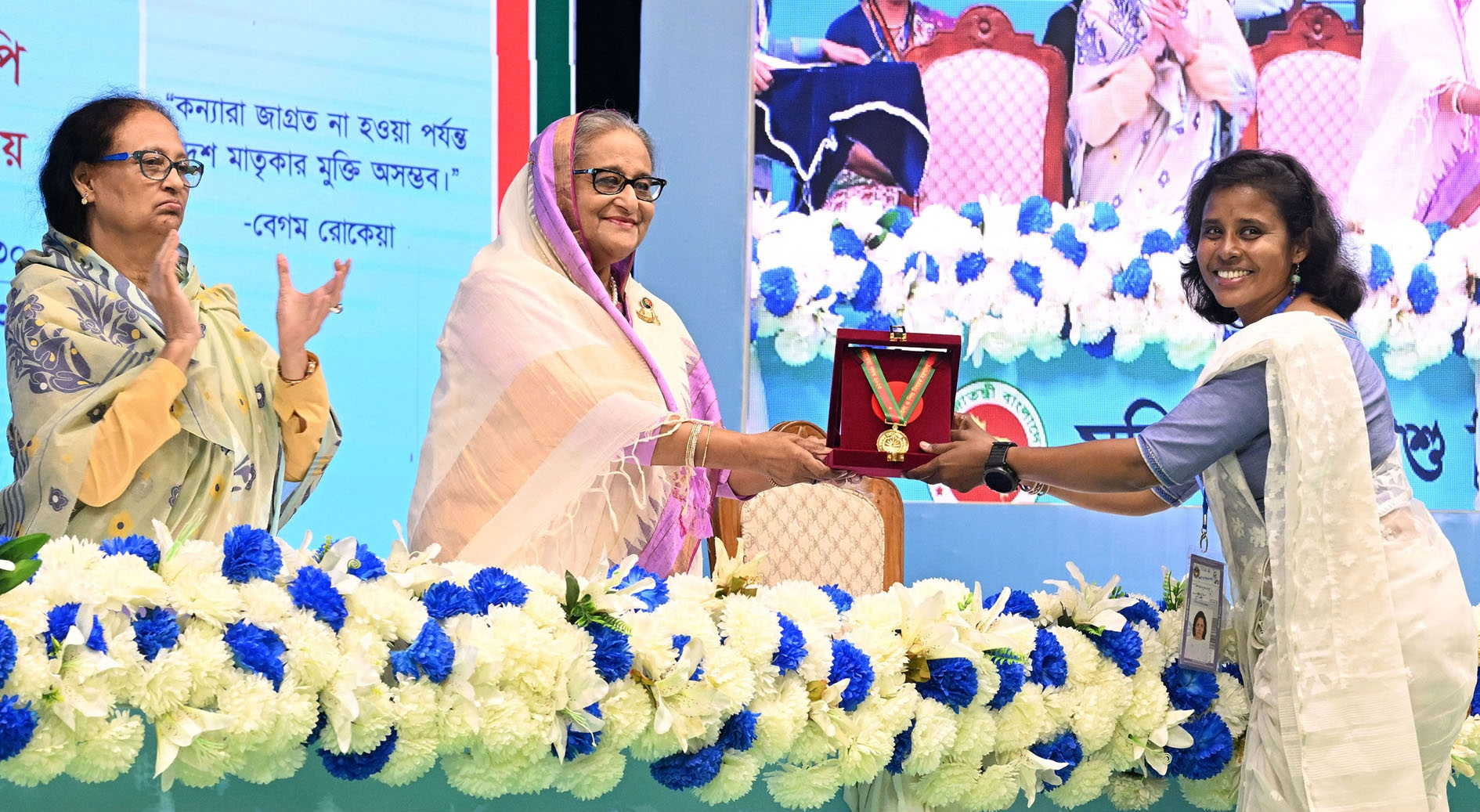
Majumdar receiving 2023 Begum Rokeya Padak

- Anannya Top Ten Awards (2008)
- Begum Rokeya Padak (2023)
- 1st Nahar Kamal Ahmad Achievement Award (2025)

== See also ==
- List of Bangladeshi summiteers of Mount Everest
