= List of Bangladeshi summiteers of Mount Everest =

This is a list of Bangladeshi summiteers of Mount Everest.

== List ==
Name	Date of summit	Note	Ref.
Musa Ibrahim	23 May 2010		
Muhammad Abdul Mohit	21 May 2011	only Bangladeshi mountaineer to have climbed Mount Everest twice	
Nishat Majumdar	19 May 2012	first Bangladeshi woman to reach the summit	
Wasfia Nazreen	26 May 2012		
Mohammad Khaled Hossain	20 May 2013	died while descending from Mount Everest	
Babar Ali	19 May 2024		
Ikramul Hasan Shakil	19 May 2025		
Nurunnahar Nimni	27 May 2026		
