= Surma Jahid =

Bangladeshi writer

Surma Jahid (born 9 July 1978) is a Bangladeshi liberation war researcher and writer. She has earned almost all major national awards including Bangla Academy Literary Award in 2017, Bangamata Begum Fazilatun Nesa Mujib Award in 2021 and Independence Day Award in 2023.

== Awards ==
- Bangla Academy Literary Award (2017)
- Bangamata Begum Fazilatun Nesa Mujib Award (2021)
- Anannya Top Ten Award (2016)
- Independence Day Award (2023)
