= Niaz Zaman =

Bangladeshi academic and writer

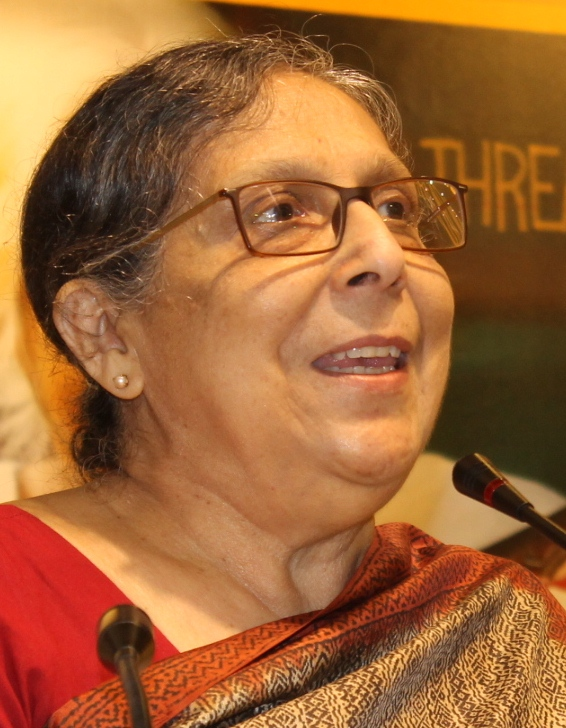
- Professor Niaz Zaman, Dhaka, 2017
- Born: 31 December 1941 (age 84); Delhi
- Education: Holy Cross College, Intermediate of Arts and Bachelor of Arts; University of Dhaka, Master's degree; American University, Master's degree, (2nd); George Washington University, Doctor of Philosophy
- Occupations: Professor; Writer; Researcher; Translator
- Writing career
- Language: Bangla
- Genres: Literature; Folk Art; Poetry; Fiction
- Notable awards: Ekushey Padak; Bangla Academy Literary Award; Anannya Literature Award

Dr Niaz Zaman (née Ali) (born 1941) is an academic, author and Bangladeshi translator. She currently advises the Department of English and Modern Languages, Independent University, Bangladesh (IUB). She retired as a professor of English at the University of Dhaka. She received the Ekushey Padak award in 2025. She was awarded the Bangla Academy Literary Award (2016) in the translation category.

== Education and career ==
Dr Zaman completed her I.A. and B.A. from Holy Cross College and M.A in English Literature from the University of Dhaka in 1963. She earned a second master's degree from the American University in Washington, DC, and obtained her PhD from George Washington University in 1987. Niaz Zaman began her career as an English Lecturer at Dhaka University in 1972. She served as an educational attache at the Bangladesh Embassy in Washington, DC, from 1981 to 1983. From 2003 until 2006, she was the literary editor of New Age magazine. She founded her publishing house writers ink in 2005. She translated several books of renowned women fiction writers in English into English. She has developed an exceptional organization "Gaanth". The organization is considered as the platform of women writers of Bengali and English medium. Since 2006, she has served as an adviser at IUB's Department of English.

== Awards ==
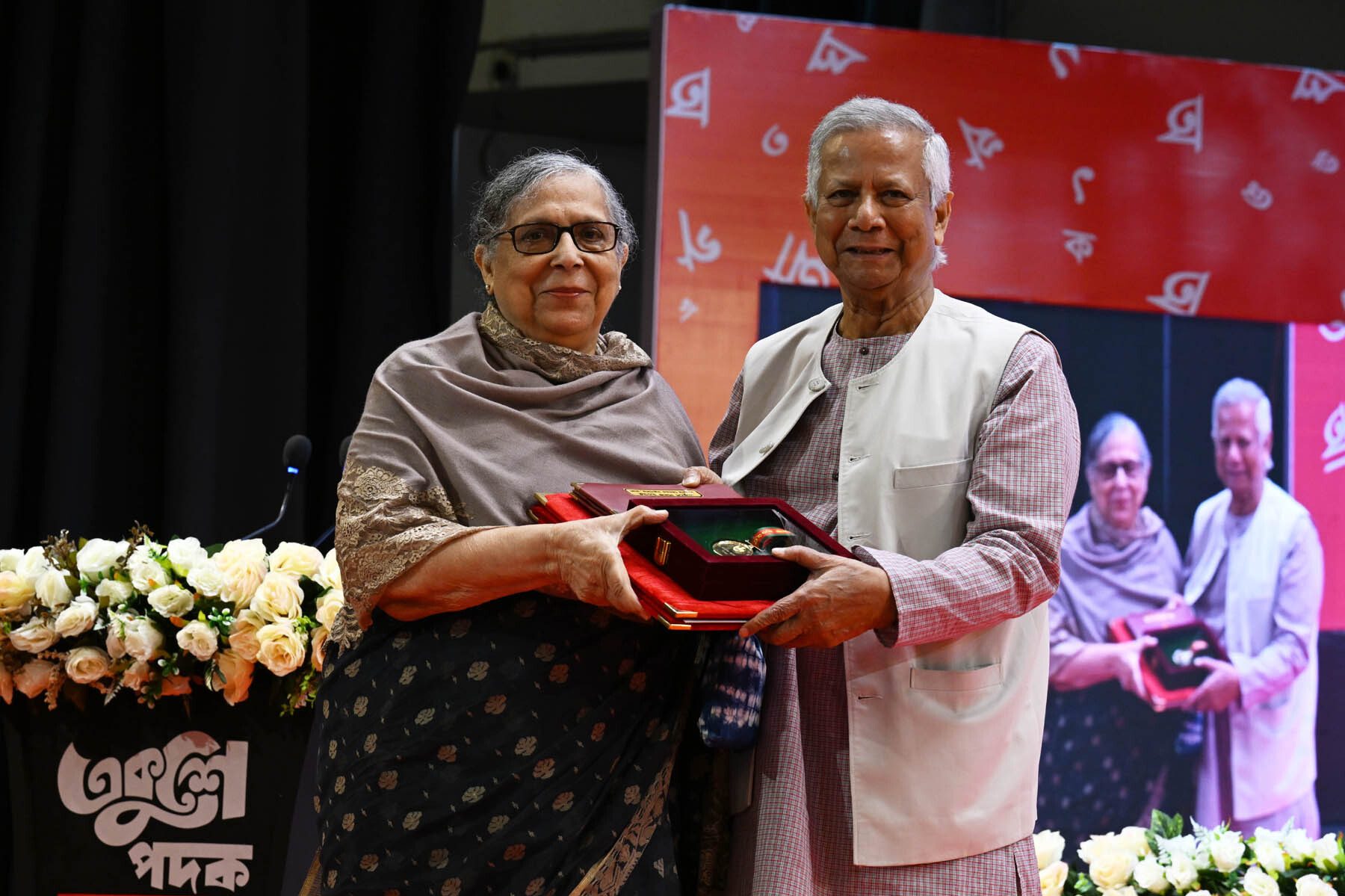
Zaman receives Ekushey Padak 2025 from Muhammad Yunus.

- Ekushey Padak (2025)
- American Alumni Association Education Award (2017)
- Bangla Academy Literary Award (2017)
- Lekhika Sangha Award for Literature (2015)
- Anannya Literature Award (2013)
- National Archives Award
- Asia week Short Story Award
- Atwar Hussain Award from Asiatic Society of Bangladesh

== Publications ==
- The Confessional Art of Tennessee Williams
- The Art of Kantha Embroidery
- A Divided Legacy: The Partition in Selected Novels of India, Pakistan and Bangladesh
- The Crooked Neem Tree
- The Dance and Other Stories, including The Daily Woman
- Didima's Necklace and Other Stories
- Princess Kalabati and Other Tales
