= Sonia Bashir Kabir =

Bangladeshi businessperson

- সোনিয়া বশির কবির
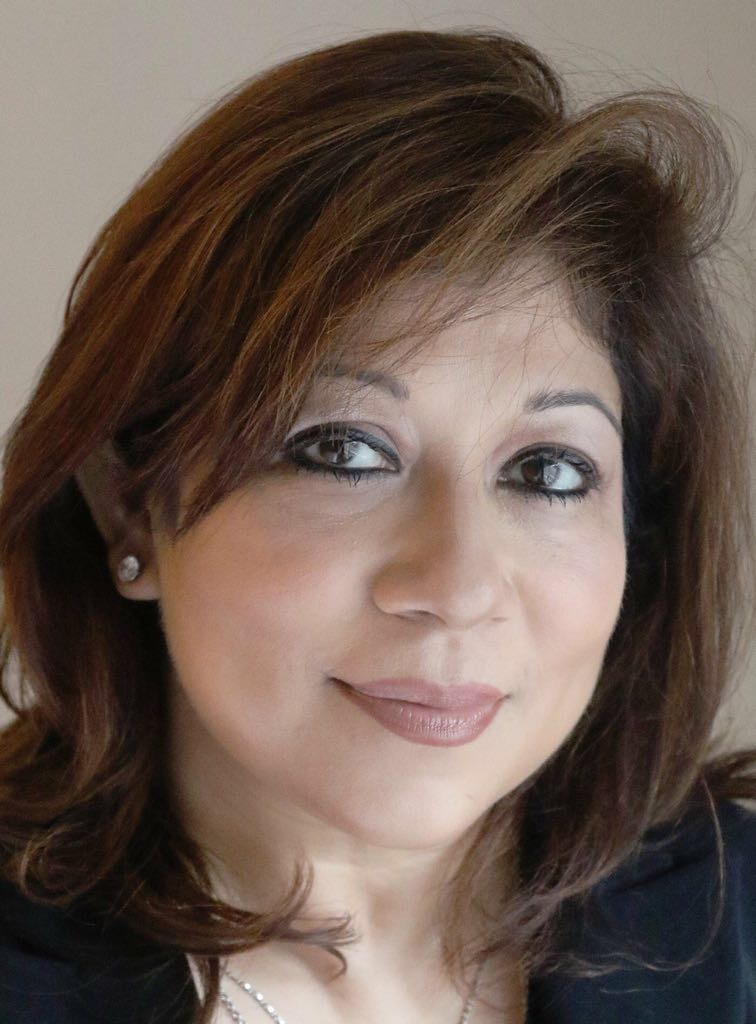
- Born: Dhaka, Bangladesh
- Education: Masters in Business Administration
- Alma mater: California State University, Santa Clara University
- Occupations: Tech Investor & Tech Entrepreneur
- Title: Founder: SBK Tech Ventures and SBK Foundation; Bangladesh Women in Technology - BWIT; The Angels Network - TAN; The Indus Entrepreneurs - TIE Dhaka; Women Tech Investors Network - WTIN; Women Tech Entrepreneurs Network - WTEN; Vice Chairman UN Tech Bank and Governing Board Member of UNESCO's Mahatma Gandhi Institute of Education for Peace and Sustainable Development (MGIEP)
- Awards: Microsoft Founder's (Bill Gates) Award 2016, SDG Pioneer Award, 2017 Anannya Top Ten Awards (2015)

Sonia Bashir Kabir is a Bangladeshi technology entrepreneur, and investor, focusing on tech startups in emerging markets of South Asia. She began her career as a tech corporate professional in Silicon Valley and her journey led her to become a technology entrepreneur, an angel investor and a licensed, Instituitonal Venture Capital Fund Manager.

== Early life and education ==
Kabir completed her Senior Cambridge at St Francis Xavier's Green Herald International School and Higher Secondary Certificate at Viqarunnisa Noon School and College. She lived and studied in Northern California, where she obtained a Bachelor of Science from California State University, East Bay, and an MBA from Santa Clara University.

She was a national athlete for Bangladesh, playing volleyball and cricket, and represented the Bangladesh National Volleyball team.

== Career ==
Sonia worked in Silicon Valley for Fortune 100 companies (Sun Microsystems & Oracle), startups & in the financial district. Her expertise include strategic planning & growth, sales execution, financial management, team building and change management.

Sonia served on the Boards of the American International School Dhaka, Bangladesh Employers Federation, Bangladesh Cricket Board (Women's Wing), Abahani Women's Games Development Committee and Women Entrepreneur's Association.

She was the Advisor for Federation of Bangladesh Chambers of Commerce and Industries (FBCCI), the apex trade organization of Bangladesh playing a pivotal role in consultative and advisory capacity, safeguarding the interest of the private sector in the country.

Sonia is the Founder of the 1st Women's IT Association in Bangladesh - Bangladesh Women in IT (BWIT) and the first Women Tech Investors Network (WTIN). She is also the Founder of The Angels Network (TAN) and the Founder President and a current Advisor of TiE Dhaka Chapter. TIE is a Silicon Valley headquartered not for profit association for fostering entrepreneurship.

Sonia has served as the managing director for Microsoft Bangladesh, Myanmar, Nepal, Bhutan and Laos, Country Director of Dell Bangladesh, Director Business Development for South East Asia, New Emerging Markets in Microsoft and Chief Operating Officer for Aamra Technologies Ltd. Former UN Secretary-General Ban Ki-moon appointed Sonia in 2015 to the Governing Council of the Technology Bank for the Least Developed Countries (LDC) for a three-year term. She was elected as Vice Chairman of UN Technology Bank in 2017.

Current UN Secretary General Antonio Guterres renewed Sonia's appointment as Governing Council member and Sonia was reappointed as Vice Chair of the UN Tech Bank for the 2019–2022 term.

Sonia has served as a board member in UNESCO's Mahatma Gandhi Institute of Education for Peace and Sustainable Development.

Sonia is the first woman to win the ICT Business Person of the Year Award from the Daily Star ICT Awards in 2019.

Sonia was one of the 5 recipients (among 100,000 Microsoft employees) to win the Microsoft Founder's Award in 2016 given by Bill Gates.

Sonia was recognized by UN Global Compact in 2017 as a SDG pioneer. 10 people globally got this recognition. She was recognized for integrating seven Global Goals into her business practices and strategies: no poverty; quality education; gender equality; decent work and economic growth; industry, innovation and infrastructure; reduced inequalities; creating partnerships to meet the Goals.

Sonia actively supports youth in technology and women empowerment with youth-led initiatives all over Bangladesh.

== Awards ==
- Named on Rest of the World’s 100 Global Tech Changemakers list, 2022
- ICT Business Person of the Year, Daily Star, 2019
- Microsoft Founders Award recipient, 2016
- SDG Pioneer Award, UN Global Compact, 2017
- Anannya Top Ten Awards, 2016

== Controversy ==
Sonia is well known for her connections to the overthrown regime of Sheikh Hasina, connections which helped her in getting numerous loans. Several Bangladeshi startups were left in financial disarray after Sonia's company, SBK Tech Ventures Ltd., did not provide promised funding. Founders of Fashol and Markopolo claimed delays in funding disbursement. Kabir is also reported to have outstanding loans, including Tk. 15 crore owed to a retired army officer, Tk. 12 crore to Fiber@Home Ltd., and Tk. 20 crore to a Bangladeshi conglomerate. SBK Tech Ventures Ltd. is involved in ongoing legal proceedings with multiple banks and financial institutions over non-payment of loans.
