= Swadesh Bose =

- স্বদেশ রঞ্জন বোস
- Born: Swadesh Ranjan Bose; 2 January 1928; Kashipur, Backergunge District, Bengal Province, British India
- Died: 3 December 2009 (aged 81); Dhaka, Bangladesh
- Education: University of Cambridge; University of Dhaka; Brojomohun College
- Occupation: Economist
- Spouse: Noorjahan Bose (m. 1963)

Swadesh Ranjan Bose (Bengali: স্বদেশ রঞ্জন বোস; 2 January 1928 – 3 December 2009) was a Bengali language movement activist and an economist. For his contributions to the field of economics he was posthumously given the Independence Day Award, Bangladesh's highest state award.

== Biography ==
Bose was born on 2 January 1928 in Kashipur village in Backergunge District, Bengal Province, British India (now Barisal District, Bangladesh).

He attended Brojomohun College in Barisal, where he became involved in student politics and obtained his Intermediate of Arts (IA) in 1944. The partition of India in 1947 made Barisal part of the new country of Pakistan. His relatives moved to India, but Bose remained in Barisal. There he was a local organiser of the early stages of the language movement, which demanded that Bengali be one of the official languages of Pakistan.

Bose was arrested on 10 March 1948 for distributing a manifesto supporting the movement. He was jailed until 1953, and was imprisoned again early in 1954 for demonstrating against Chief Minister Nurul Amin's visit to Barisal. After the United Front came to power in the March provincial election, he was released briefly, only to be detained a third time after the Governor-General of Pakistan declared a state of emergency and dismissed the provincial government in May. Ultimately he was released in late 1956.

He earned a BA in 1958, and in 1960 completed an MA in economics at the University of Dhaka. The following year he joined the Pakistan Institute of Development Economics (PIDE) in Karachi. There he co-authored, with American economist Henry J. Bruton, his first book, The Pakistan Export Bonus Scheme.

In 1963, he married Noorjahan. She too had been a language movement activist, and was a University of Dhaka graduate. She was ten years his junior, the widow of a friend, and had a young son, Jaseem Ahmed. It was an inter-faith marriage (he was Hindu, she was Muslim), which upset her family, and got the couple expelled from the leftist political party to which they both belonged.

They moved to England, where he completed his PhD thesis: "Regional co-operation for development in South Asia, with special reference to India and Pakistan" and received his degree from the University of Cambridge in 1967.

The family returned to Karachi, where he resumed working for the PIDE, under new director Nurul Islam, a fellow Bengali economist. Their work highlighted the economic disparity between the western and eastern wings of Pakistan. Decades later, President of Bangladesh Zillur Rahman would say, "Swadesh Bose raised his voice against discriminatory economic policy of the then Pakistani regime". The PIDE relocated from Karachi to Dhaka in December 1970, and Bose and his family, which now included daughters Monica and Anita, followed.

Shortly thereafter, the Bangladesh Liberation War broke out. The family fled on foot to West Bengal, India, where they took refuge. During the war, Bose worked in the planning cell of the government in exile, planning post-war economic reconstruction. After Bangladesh achieved independence in December 1971, the PIDE was reconstituted as the Bangladesh Institute of Development Economics (later renamed the Bangladesh Institute of Development Studies). Bose became its first director general.

In 1974, he moved to Oxford University as a visiting fellow at Queen Elizabeth House. Later that year he joined the World Bank, and moved his family to Washington, DC. He worked for the World Bank until the mid-1990s.

Bose developed Parkinson's disease, and died in 2009 in Dhaka, Bangladesh.

== Selected works ==
A number of Bose's books, reports, and working papers are each held by 20 or more libraries. The University Press Limited published his collected works posthumously, in two volumes edited by his son.

- Bruton, Henry J.; Bose, Swadesh R. (1963). The Pakistan Export Bonus Scheme. Karachi: Institute of Development Economics. OCLC 977560.
- Bose, Swadesh R.; Clark, Edwin H. (1969). Some Basic Considerations on Agricultural Mechanization in West Pakistan. Karachi: Institute of Development Economics. OCLC 557534890.
- Bose, Swadesh R., ed. (1970). Studies on Fiscal and Monetary Problems. Karachi. OCLC 468745530.
- Bose, Swadesh R. (1975). Some Aspects of Unskilled Labor Markets for Civil Construction in India: Observations Based on Field Investigation. Washington, D.C.: International Bank for Reconstruction and Development. OCLC 773233661.
- Baldwin, George B.; Bose, Swadesh R. (1978). Papua New Guinea its Economic Situation and Prospects for Development. Washington, D.C.: World Bank. ISBN 978-0-8018-2091-5.
- Gulhati, Ravi; Bose, Swadesh R.; Atukorala, Vimal (1985). Exchange Rate Policies in Eastern and Southern Africa, 1965-1983. Washington, D.C.: World Bank. ISBN 978-0-8213-0501-0.
- Bose, Swadesh R. (2011). Ahmed, Jaseem (ed.). Collected Works. Vol. I. Dhaka: The University Press Limited. ISBN 978-984-506-001-1.
- —— (2011). Ahmed, Jaseem (ed.). Collected Works. Vol. II. Dhaka: The University Press Limited. ISBN 978-984-506-002-8.

== Awards ==
Bose received several awards posthumously:

- In 2010, the Bangladesh Economic Association (BEA), the country's apex organization for economists, awarded him their gold medal.
- In 2013, the Independence Day Award, Bangladesh's highest state award, was bestowed upon him for his work in the field of economics.
- In 2014, he was honoured with the Bangladesh Bank Award for his "outstanding contribution in the field of economics".
