= Abdullah Al Mamun (Kaikor) =

- আব্দুল্লাহ আল মামুন
- Occupations: Writer, screenwriter, director, lyricist, columnist
- Title: Managing Director and CEO of Adnarrate Limited
- Writing career
- Pen name: Kaikor
- Years active: 2016–present
- Genres: Psychological thriller, crime fiction, poetry, philosophical fiction
- Notable works: Bohurupi Kaikor, Banani Kabarasthan, Philosophir Boyosh Koto?, Kichu Bola Jay Na, Jibon Haoway Vase
- Notable awards: Rokomari Bestseller Award (2022, 2024)
- Website: Kaikor/কাইকর · Abdullah Al Mamun (Kaikor)

Abdullah Al Mamun (Bengali: আব্দুল্লাহ আল মামুন), popularly known by his pen name Kaikor, is a Bangladeshi writer, screenwriter, lyricist, director, and columnist. He is known for his psychological thrillers, distinctive storytelling, and contributions to Bangladeshi television and literature. He is the Managing Director and Chief Executive Officer of Adnarrate Limited, an advertising agency.

== Career ==
Mamun began his career in the television industry in 2016, working as an assistant director in television drama productions. During this period, he also began writing novels and television scripts. His interest in filmmaking developed from observing television and film productions in Pubail, where shooting frequently took place.

As a screenwriter, he has written more than 80 television dramas. His work in screenwriting has also received recognition, including a Critics' Choice nomination at the Meril-Prothom Alo Awards 2024 for the short film Porospor.

== Literary work ==
Abdullah Al Mamun began his literary journey in 2016. His debut book, Bohurupi Kaikor, introduced the character from whom he later adopted his pen name. His literary works include novels, poetry collections, and short-story collections, with a focus on psychological thrillers, crime fiction, and philosophical themes.

According to a February 2026 interview with Kaler Kantho, he had written 10 books, comprising six novels, four poetry collections, and one short-story collection.

His notable works include:

- Bohurupi Kaikor
- Kaikor Kamlar Bou
- Srijit Mukherji-r Naam Ki?
- Banani Kabarasthan
- Philosophir Boyosh Koto?
- Char Janala
- Kichu Bola Jay Na
- Maa Prithibir Rasta
- Shyola Ful
- Jibon Haoway Vase

His books are listed on the online bookstore Rokomari.

=== Notable books ===
Philosophir Boyosh Koto? became one of his commercially successful poetry collections. According to Mamun, the book reached the second position in Rokomari's poetry bestseller rankings within a year of publication. He has also described Kichu Bola Jay Na as a commercially successful poetry collection and Banani Kabarasthan as a successful novel.

In 2026, he discussed his upcoming book Itihash Barovhatari, a work examining historical narratives and the ways history changes through time and political power. He outlined plans to publish the book in seven languages across 12 countries, including Bengali, English, Persian, Urdu, Latin, Spanish, and Hungarian.

== Themes ==
Kaikor's literary works explore human psychology, identity, human duality, crime, emotional struggles, and philosophical questions. His storytelling combines suspense, psychological elements, and cinematic narrative techniques. Alongside fiction, he has also written poetry and columns.

== Media work ==
In addition to literature, Mamun has worked in television production and screenwriting. He began as an assistant director and subsequently became involved in writing television dramas. His screenwriting work includes the short film Porospor, which received a Critics' Choice nomination at the Meril-Prothom Alo Awards 2024.

He has also written song lyrics, including Ashwas, performed by singer Nobel.

== Business career ==
Outside the creative industry, Mamun is involved in advertising and entrepreneurship. He serves as the Managing Director and CEO of Adnarrate Limited, an advertising agency that works on promotional campaigns for several leading brands in Bangladesh. He is also involved in operating a garment factory and has discussed plans to expand into the restaurant business.

He has also advocated for changes in the business model of the Bangladeshi publishing industry, particularly regarding authors' royalties, advance payments, and international distribution. He has experimented with manuscript auctions, book sponsorships, and advance royalty agreements to create alternative sources of income for writers.

== Recognition ==
In 2022, Mamun attracted media attention when the first copy of his novel Banani Kabarasthan was auctioned for ৳66,666.

He has received the Rokomari Bestseller Award twice, according to his 2026 interview with Kaler Kantho.

== Awards and nominations ==
আবদুল্লাহ আল মামুন (কাইকোর) পুরস্কার অর্জন করেছেন

- Rokomari Bestseller Award – two-time recipient.
- Critics' Choice nomination – Meril-Prothom Alo Awards 2024, for Porospor.

== Pen name ==
The name Kaikor originated from the central character of Mamun's debut book, Bohurupi Kaikor. Following the book's popularity, readers began identifying the author by the character's name, and he subsequently adopted it as his pen name. He has also explained that the absence of author photographs and biographical information in his books contributed to public curiosity about his identity.

== See also ==
- List of Bangladeshi writers
- Bangladeshi literature
