= Bangladesh Mahila Parishad =

- Bangladesh Mahila Parishad
- বাংলাদেশ মহিলা পরিষদ
- Abbreviation: BMP
- Formation: April 4, 1970
- Founder: Sufia Kamal
- Legal status: Organization
- Purpose: Ensuring Woman's rights
- Headquarters: Segunbagicha
- Location: Dhaka, Bangladesh
- Region served: International
- Official language: Bengali, English
- Secretary General: Dr Fauzia Moslem
- Volunteers: 134000+
- Website: https://mahilaparishad.org/
- Formerly called: East Pakistan Mahila Parishad

Bangladesh Mahila Parishad (BMP, Women's Council of Bangladesh) is a women's human rights organization. It was established on 4 April 1970. After the liberation war, Bangladesh Mahila Parishad was registered under the society act in 1976, in the free Bangladesh. It is supported by Norway.

== History ==
Bangladesh Mahila Parishad was established on 4 April 1970 as the East Pakistan Mahila Parishad by Sufia Kamal. The first president of Mahila Parishad was Sufia Kamal and the first general secretary was Maleka Begum. The organization was created during the 1969 East Pakistan mass uprising which led to the resignation of President of Pakistan Ayub Khan and its founders supported the Bangladesh Liberation War in 1971. After the Independence of Bangladesh, the organization was renamed to Bangladesh Mahila parishad.

Bangladesh Mahila Parishad in 1972 demanded that the government of Bangladesh reform the inheritance laws and increase the number of reserved seats for women. It also asked the government for direct election to reserved women's seat. It received official registration in 1976 and is member of the Economic and Social Council of United Nations. From 1976 to 1977, Bangladesh Mahila Parishad carried out a signature collection campaign against the practice of dowry in Bangladesh.

In 1985, Bangladesh Mahila Parishad founded a women's shelter called Rokeya Sadan. Bangladesh Mahila Parishad established Sristi made by the residents of Rokeya Sadan. Bangladesh Mahila Parishad campaigned for the Family Courts Ordinance, 1985 and the Prevention of Women and Children Repression Act, 2000. Bangladesh Mahila Parishad has 134 thousand registered members. It has worked with Committee on the Elimination of Discrimination against Women. It has pledged to working to accomplish the goals of the Cairo Declaration.

The president of Bangladesh Mahila Parishad, Ayesha Khanam, died in January 2021. In February 2021, Dr Fauzia Moslem was elected president of Bangladesh Mahila Parishad while Maleka Banu was general secretary.

== See also ==
- Mahila Atma Raksha Samiti, MARS, Bengal organisation formed 1942, predecessor of National Federation of Indian Women
- Bangladesh Mahila Samiti
