= Nadira Majumder =

Bangladeshi writer (born 1953)

- নাদিরা মজুমদার
- Born: 1 May 1953 (age 73)
- Education: University of Dhaka
- Occupation: Writer

Nadira Majumder (born 1 May 1953) is a Bangladeshi writer. She won Bangla Academy Literary Award (2019) and Anannya Literature Award (2019) for her contribution in the field of books about science. She resides in Czech Republic.

== Background ==
Majumder completed her bachelor's in physics from the University of Dhaka. Professionally, she has worked as an accountant, computer programmer, financial manager, and a policy maker for the Czech Republic. She also worked as an external consultant to the United Nations High Commissioner for Refugees.

== Works ==
Majumder writes science-related books.

- Ei Amader Prithibi
- Akmeru Bonam Bohumeru
- Mohabishshe Amrao Achi
- Biman
- Krittim Upogroho
- Agneogiri O Bhumikomper Kahini
- Nanaronger Biggan
- Einstein Superstar
- Shomoy
- Tumi Ke?
