= Jyoti Prakash Dutta (writer) =

Bangladeshi writer

- Occupations: Writer, newspaper editor, professor
- Spouse: Purabi Basu
- Awards: Ekushey Padak

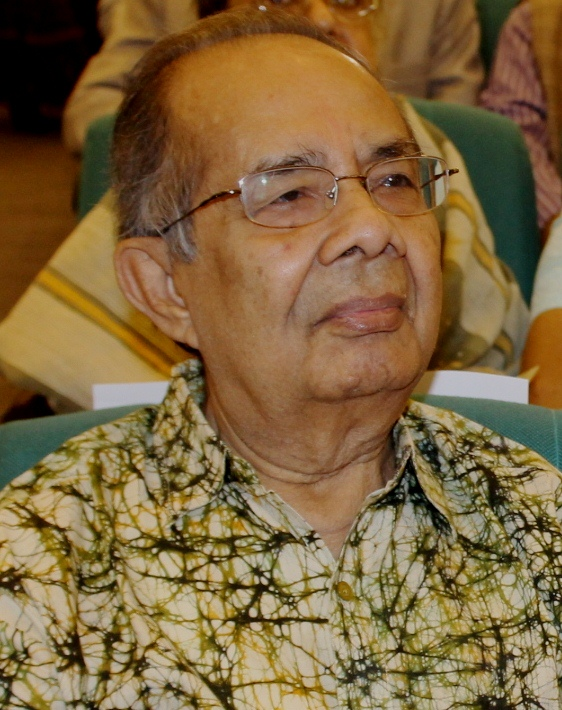
Jyoti Prakash Dutta in 2017

Jyoti Prakash Dutta is a Bangladeshi short-story writer. He was awarded Ekushey Padak in 2016 by the government of Bangladesh.

== Career ==
Dutta has been serving as a professor of the Department of Economics and the dean of the Social Sciences Faculty at the University of Chittagong.

== Personal life ==
Dutta was married to scientist Purabi Basu until her death in 2026.
