= Purabi Basu =

Bangladeshi writer, pharmacologist and activist (1949–2026)

- পূরবী বসু
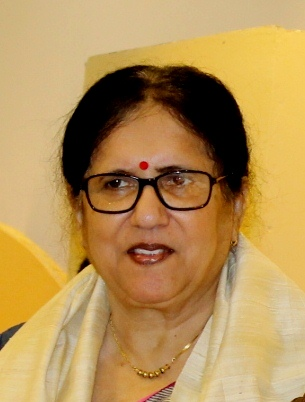
- Basu in 2017
- Born: 21 September 1949; Munshiganj District, East Bengal, Dominion of Pakistan (now Bangladesh)
- Died: 14 November 2026 (aged 77); Florida, U.S.
- Education: University of Dhaka (BPharm); Woman's Medical College of Pennsylvania (MS); University of Missouri (PhD)
- Occupations: Writer, pharmacologist, activist
- Spouse: Jyoti Prakash Dutta
- Children: 2

Purabi Basu (21 September 1949 – 13 November 2026) was a Bangladeshi short-story writer, essayist, poet, pharmacologist and feminist activist. She won the Anannya Literary Award in 2005 and the Bangla Academy Literary Award in 2013. Basu also worked as a senior executive at Wyeth Pharmaceuticals, a drug company based in New York.

== Early life and education ==
Purabi Basu was born in Munshiganj District, on 21 September 1949, into a Bengali Hindu family. She began writing in her childhood, later publishing in Dainik Bangla under Ahsan Habib. She earned a bachelor's degree in pharmacy from the University of Dhaka, a master's in biochemistry from the Woman's Medical College of Pennsylvania (1972), and a Ph.D. in nutrition from the University of Missouri (1976), followed by postdoctoral research at the University of South Alabama.

== Career ==
Basu held research and academic roles at institutions including Cornell University Medical College and Memorial Sloan Kettering Cancer Center, receiving recognition from the National Institutes of Health and the American Institute of Nutrition. She worked as a quality assurance specialist and senior executive at Wyeth Pharmaceuticals in New York. In Bangladesh, she worked with organizations such as Gonoshasthaya Kendra, Beximco Pharmaceuticals, and BRAC as director of the Health, Nutrition and Population Division.

== Personal life and death ==
Basu was married to writer Jyoti Prakash Dutta, a recipient of the Ekushey Padak and Bangla Academy Literary Award, with whom she had a son and a daughter.

Following prolonged health complications—including Parkinson's disease, a stroke, and injuries from a road collision, Basu died at her home in Florida, United States, on 13 November 2026. She was 77.

== Literary works ==
Basu's literary output spanned short stories, essays, and translations focusing heavily on feminist themes and communal harmony, beginning with her 1989 debut collection Purabi Bosur Galpo.

=== Short story collections ===
- Purabi Bosur Galpo (1989), Ajanma Parabashi (1992), Se Nahi Nahi (1995), Niruddha Samiran (1996), Ekoda Ekhane Kanya Santan Janmo Nito (2000), Anityo Aninda (2001), Josona Korechhey Aari (2005), and Galpo Samagra (2005)

=== Essays, non-fiction, and edited works ===
- Notable non-fiction and essay titles include Name Kee Ashe Jai (1993), Nari Bhabona (2000), alongside works such as Nari Matritto O Srijonshilota and Chotoder Begum Rokeya
- Co-edited and translated works include Bangali (1992, with Haroon Habib), Nari Tumi Nitya (1993), Ekhono Gelo Na Andhar (1993, with Shafi Ahmed), and Bangladesher Nari Andoloner Galpo (1996, with Shafi Ahmed)

=== Notable English-translated stories ===
- "Radha Will Not Cook Today"
- "Saleha's Desire"
