= Shahnaz Munni =

Bangladeshi journalist and new editor

- শাহনাজ মুন্নী
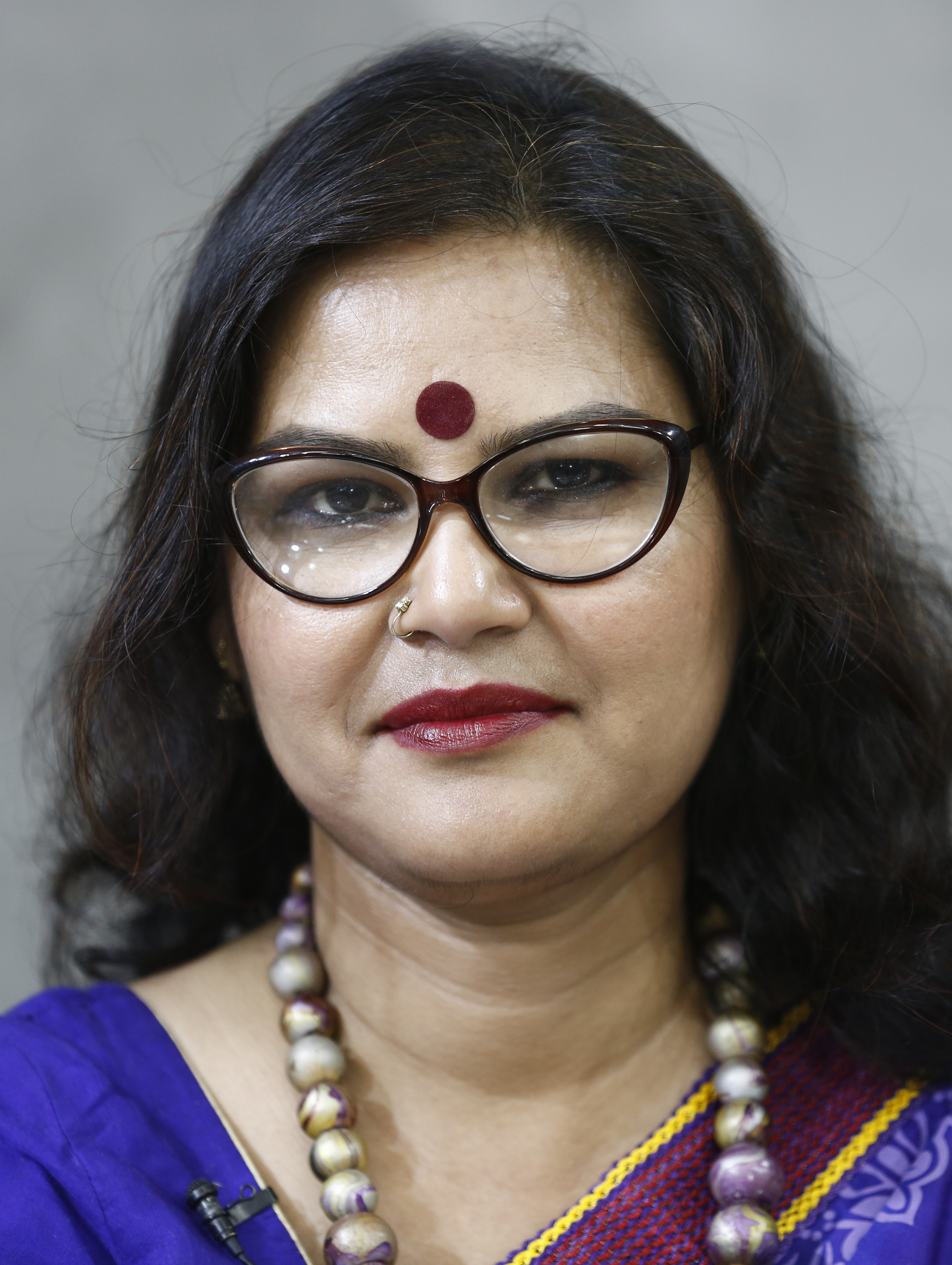
- Munni in 2018
- Born: 8 February 1969 (age 57); Dhaka, East Pakistan, Pakistan
- Education: University of Dhaka

Shahnaz Munni (born 8 February 1969) is a Bangladeshi journalist, poet, and writer. Since January 2016, she has been chief news editor with the Dhaka-based television channel News24. She also takes a special interest in children's welfare. As of 2023, she has written 24 books.

== Education ==
Born on 8 February 1969 in Dhaka, Munni attended Dhaka's Holy Cross College before studying social sciences at the University of Dhaka in 1994.

== Career ==
On graduation, Munni's career as a journalist started with Ekushey Television at the beginning in 1999. She then joined ATN Bangla as a senior reporter in 2003 before moving to News 24 as a special correspondent. In 2016, she was promoted to senior news editor.

Munni has also taken a special interest in children's welfare. In September 2006, she was one of the 20 eminent poets who contributed to UNICEF's Child Rights Poetry Festival aimed at improving society's attitudes towards the rights of children. In 2009, she won second prize in the Meena Media Awards in the over-18 television journalism category for reporting on children sniffing glue. She commented that it was often difficult to cover children on television as the media are primarily interested in adult viewers: "There is so much scope for the media to improve the situation of children, but first we need to change the attitude and mindset of the editorial decision makers." In 2013, in her role as an ambassador of MCHIP (Maternal and Child Health Integrated Program), she visited the communities of Amjiriganj and Nabiganj Upazilas, collecting background for the 50 success stories she is writing for the MaMoni Save the Children project. Munni has also contributed to fighting tuberculosis in Bangladesh, assisting BRAC on the three-member jury for the 2015 awards.

As a writer, Munni is a poet, an essayist, a short story writer, and a novelist, writing for young people. Jiner Konnaya (The Spirit's Daughter), her first book of short stories, was published in 1997. Munni has participated in the "Poets Translating Poets" project run by the Goethe Institute, under which poets writing in the Indian and South Asian languages were introduced to German poetry while their works were translated into German. Several of her Bengali poems were translated into German while she translated poems by the modern German poet Hendrik Jackson.

As a sociology graduate of the University of Dhaka, Munni has carried out research in connection with Azfar Hussain.

== Works ==
- Elo Kruddho Ondhokar
- Badur o Brandy
- Tritiyo Ghonta Porar Agei
- Paan Sundori
- Ami ar Amin Jokhon Azimpur Thaktam
- Snaner Shobdo

== Awards ==
- 1429 Anannya Literature Award (2023)
