= Syed Shamsul Haque =

Bangladeshi writer (1935 – 2016)

Syed Shamsul Haq
- সৈয়দ শামসুল হক
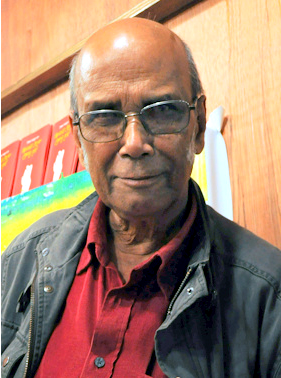
- Pronunciation: [soi̯̯ɔd̪ ʃamsul ɦɔk]
- Born: 27 December 1935; Kurigram, Bengal Presidency, British India
- Died: 27 September 2016 (aged 80); Dhaka, Bangladesh
- Occupation: Writer
- Years active: 1954–2016
- Spouse: Anwara Syed Haq
- Children: Bidita Sadiq (daughter); Ditio Syed-Haq (son)
- Parents: Syed Siddique Husain (father); Halima Khatun (mother)
- Relatives: Syed Raisuddin (grandfather)
- Awards: full list

Syed Shamsul Haq (Note: Bengali: সৈয়দ শামসুল হক, Bengali pronunciation: [soi̯̯ɔd̪ ʃamsul ɦɔk].) (Bengali: সৈয়দ শামসুল হক, pronounced [soi̯̯ɔd̪ ʃamsul ɦɔk]; 27 December 1935 – 27 September 2016) was a Bangladeshi writer. He was awarded Bangla Academy Literary Award in 1966 (the youngest among all to receive it), Ekushey Padak in 1984 and Independence Day Award in 2000 by the Government of Bangladesh for his contributions to Bangla literature. His notable works include "Payer Awaj Pawa Jai", "Nishiddho Loban", "Khelaram Khele Ja", "Neel Dongshon" and "Mrigoya". He is known as "Sabyasachi" for his contribution to every branch of litareture.

== Early life ==
Haq was born in Kurigram on 27 December 1935 to Syed Siddique Husain, a homeopathic physician, and Halima Khatun. He was the eldest of the eight children. In 1951, he went to Bombay to work as an assistant to film director Kamal Amrohi while he was making his film Mahal but left the job the next year.

== Personal life ==
Haq was married to Anwara Syed Haq. She is a member of the Royal College of Psychiatrists in London. Together they have one daughter, Bidita Sadiq, and one son, Ditio Syed-Haq.

On 27 September 2016, he died of lung cancer at the age of 80 in Dhaka.

== Work ==
Haq wrote poetry, fiction, plays (mostly in verse), music lyrics and essays. His literary works were included in the curriculum of school level, secondary, higher secondary and graduation level Bengali literature in Bangladesh.

Haq also wrote songs, including "Jar Chaya Poreche Monero Aynate" and "Haire Manush Rongin Fanush".

Poetry

- Ekoda Ek Rajje (1961)
- Boishekhe Rochito Ponktimala (1969)
- Birotihin Utsob (1969)
- Protidhonigon (1976)
- Opor Purush (1978)
- Kobita Samagra (2007)
- Ek Ascharja Sangamer Smriti
- Poraner Gohin Vitor

Novels

- Ek Mahilar Chhobi (1959)
- Anupam Din (1962)
- Simana Chhariye (1964)
- Neel Dangshon (1981)
- Smritimedh (1986)
- Mrigayay Kalakshep (1986)
- Stabdhatar Anubad (1987)
- Ek Juboker Chhayapath (1987)
- Swapna Sankranta (1989)
- Brishti O Bidrohigon (1996)
- Baro Diner Shishu (1989)
- Banabala Kichu Taka Dhar Niyechhilo (1989)
- Trahi (1989)
- Tumi Sei Tarbari (1986)
- Kayekti Manusher Sonali Jouban (1989)
- Shreshtho Uponyas (1990)
- Nirbasita (1990)
- Nishiddha Loban (1990)
- Khelaram Khele Ja (1991)
- Megh O Machine (1991)
- Iha Manush (1991)
- Mahashunye Poran Master
- Dwitiya Diner Kahini
- Balikar Candrojan
- Ayna Bibir Pala
- Kaldharma
- Duratwa
- Na Jeyo Na
- Onya Ek Alingan
- Ek Mutho Janmabhumi
- Bukjhim Bhalobasa
- Acena
- Alor Jonyo
- Rajar Sundari
- Gupta Jibon Prakashya Mritu
- Chokebazi
- Duder Galase Nil Machi
- Jesmin Road
- Khelaram Khele Ja

Stories

- Tash (1954)
- Seet Bikel (1959)
- Rokto Golap (1964)
- Anonder Mrittu (1967)
- Collected Short Stories (2006)

Films

- Phir Milengey Hum Dono (1966), screenwriter and director

Plays

- Payer Awaj Paoa Jay
- Nuruldiner Sara Jibon
- Ekhane Ekhon
- Ganonayaka
- Eersha
- Narigon
- Uttarbangsha
- Khatta Tamasha
- Judhha ebong Judhha
- Collected Verse plays
- Collected plays
- Banglar Mati Banglar Jol

Translations

- Shakespeare's Macbeth
- Shakespeare's The Tempest
- Shakespeare's Troilus and Cressida
- Ibsen's Peer Gynt

== Awards ==
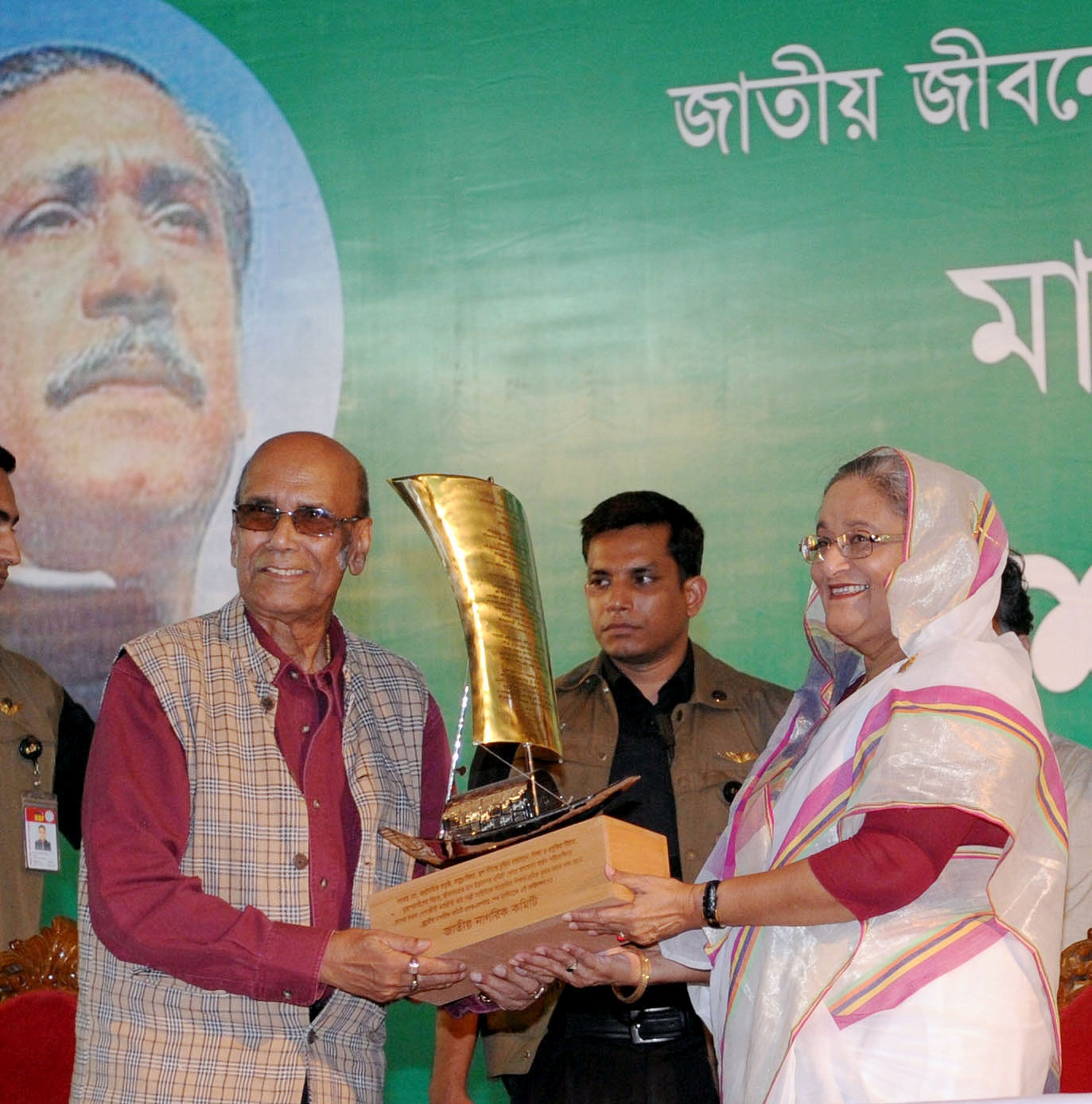
Haque with Prime Minister Sheikh Hasina in 2016.

- Bangla Academy Literary Award (1966)
- Adamjee Literary Award (1969)
- Alakta Gold Medal (1982)
- Alaol Literary Award (1983)
- Kabitalap Award (1983)
- Literary Award of the Association of Women Writers
- Ekushey Padak (1984)
- TENAS Medal (1990)
- Jebunnessa-Mahbubullah Gold Medal (1985)
- Padabali Kabita Award (1987)
- Nasiruddin Gold Medal (1990)
- National Poetry Award (1997)
- Independence Day Award (2000)
- National Poetry Honour (2001)
- Premchand Fellowship of Sahitya Akademi of India (2010)
