= Anannya Top Ten Awards =

Ananya Top Ten Awards
- Awarded for: Excellence in various achievements for Bangladesh
- Date: 1993
- Location: Dhaka
- Country: Bangladesh
- Presented by: Anannya Magazine
- Website: www.anannya.com.bd

Anannya Top Ten Awards (Bengali: অনন্যা শীর্ষ দশ পুরস্কার) is the prize for women in Bangladesh recognition of contribution to the fields of agriculture, industrial, trade, economics, acting, music, sports, education, liberation war, social welfare and development-work-law, human rights, entrepreneur, politics and journalism. The award is being given since 1993.

== History ==
The magazine is noted for its annual awards Anannya Top Ten Awards to outstanding women in Bangladesh since 1993. Anannya Magazine provided the Anannya Top Ten awards to individuals women for significant contributions to the development in specific sector. The magazine gives this award in recognition of her contribution to the fields of agriculture, industrial, trade, economics, acting, music, sports, education, liberation war, social welfare and development-work-law, human rights, entrepreneur, politics, and journalism. The winners are awarded crests of prizes.

== Awards by year ==
1993

- Taslima Nasreen
- Kanak Chanpa Chakma
- Moushumi

1994

- Nilima Ibrahim
- Runa Laila
- Champa
- Bibi Russell

1995

- Sultana Kamal
- Anwara Syed Haq
- Kangalini Sufia
- Sara Zaker

1996

- Sheikh Hasina

1998

- Razia Khan Amin

2000

- Valerie Ann Taylor
- Shameem Akhtar

2001

- Beggzadi Mahmuda Nasir
- Munni Saha

2002

- Pragna Laboni

2003

- Selina Bahar Zaman
- Hamida Hossain
- Kumudini Hajong
- Taslima Mansoor
- Rehana Kashem
- Captain Shahana
- Roksana Salam
- Shimul Yousuf
- Yasmine Kabir
- Aditi Mohsin

2004

- Fazilatunnesa Bulu
- Siddika Kabir
- Monowara Hakim Ali
- Hasna Jasimuddin Moudud
- Aleya Ferdousi
- Sadia Sultana Shampa
- Marjia Islam
- Marina Tabassum
- Roushan Ara Roksana Sarker

2005

- Zobaida Hannan
- Monjulika Chakma
- Halima Khatun
- Noorjahan Bose
- Asma Huque
- Shumi Khan
- Najli Laila Mansoor
- Shamima Khatoon
- Sara Hossain
- Molla Sabira

2006

- Halida Hanum Akhter
- Khurshid Jahan Begum
- Rubaba Dowla Motin
- Shefalika Tripura
- Rokeya Rafik Baby
- Salma Khan
- Nazira Quraishi
- Hena Kabir
- Murshida Arzoo Alpona
- Jharna Sarker

2008

- Farida Parveen
- Samia Zaman
- Afroza Baree
- Zakia Begum
- Sandha Ranee Sangma
- Shaheena Rahman
- Shahnaz Husne Zahan
- Nusrat Mamtaj Rupshee
- Munira Morshed Munni
- Nishat Majumdar

2009

- Rawshan Ara Bachchu
- Shila Momen
- Reenat Fauzia
- Mauluda Begum
- Shabnam Ferdousi
- Fahmida Khatun
- Monira Rahman
- Tahniat Ahmed Karim
- Hosne Ara Begum
- Salma Haq

2012

- Baby Maudud
- Latifa Akhand
- Jowshan Ara Rahman
- Khaleda Salahuddin
- Selina Khalek
- Rokeya Mannan
- Syeda Shamse Ara Rahman
- Setara Musa
- Zeenat Ara Bhuiyan
- Zeenat Ahmed

2013

- Mahfuza Khanam
- Luna Shamsuddoha
- Khorsheda Begum
- Meghna Guhathakurta
- Firdausi Qadri
- Kashfia Ahmed
- Mili Biswas
- Farzana Rupa
- Nurunnahar Begum
- Chondona Majumder

2014

- Laila Noor
- Farzana Islam
- Khaleda Ekram
- Tahmina Banu
- Meher Afroz Chumki
- Roksana Sultana
- Tureen Afroz
- Nazia Andaleeb Preema
- Nayma Haque
- Tamanna-E-Lutfi
- Salma Khatun (sports)
- Dil Monowora Monu

2015

- Ummay Tanzila Chowdhury Munia
- Sonia Bashir Kabir
- Luva Nahid Choudhury
- Wasfia Nazreen
- Maliha Quadir
- Anima Mukti Gomez
- Supriti Dhor
- Mabia Akhter
- Mahfuza Khatun
- Aparna Ghosh
- Sahida Aktar Jhorna

2016

- Selina Hayat Ivy (politics)
- Perween Hasan (education)
- Sabina Khatun (sports)
- Tasmina Aktar (bravery)
- Zeba Islam Seraj (scientific research)
- Ashrafun Nahar Misti (disability right activism)
- Saberi Alam (acting)
- Nisha Rani Malakar (artistry)
- Surma Jahid (liberation war research)
- Bashonti Murmu (indigenous right activism)

2017

- Sadeka Halim
- Mst Nazmanara Khanum
- Farjana Chowdhury
- Nabanita Chowdhury
- Swapna Rani
- Nadira Khanam
- Mahfuja Akter Kiron
- Nazia Jabin
- Sarmin Sultana
- Maria Manda (sports)

2018

- Sayeba Akhter (medical)
- Parveen Mahmud (management and development)
- Afroza Khan (entrepreneur)
- Sona Rani Roy (homecraft)
- Lailee Bagum (journalism)
- Nazmun Nahar (traveler)
- Sweety Das Chowdhury (Manipuri dance)
- Rumana Ahmed (sports)
- Shamsunnahar (administration)
- Fatema Khatun (technology)

2019

- Farida Zaman (art)
- Protibha Sangma (education)
- Esrat Khan Mojlish (organisation)
- Sreemati Shaha (social work)
- Shumona Sharmin (journalism)
- Nasima Akter Nisha (entrepreneur)
- F Minor (music)
- Hazera Begum (activism)
- Falguni Shaha (inspiration)
- Eti Khatun (archer)

2020

- Kamrunnahar Zafar (politics)
- Shahida Begum (entrepreneurship)
- Lafifa Jamal (technology)
- Alpana Rani (agriculture)
- Chayanika Chowdhury (drama)
- Shwapna Bhowmick (corporate job)
- Senjuti Saha (science)
- Tashnuva Anan Shishir (activism)
- Jahanara Alam (sports)
- Ruponti Chowdhury (folk-tradition)

2021

- Sara Mala Chakma (science)
- Shahinur Akhter (bravery)
- Naznin Ahmed (economics)
- Bitpi Das Chowdhury (corporate)
- Shahriar Farzana (photography)
- Shantona Rani Ray (martial arts)
- Joya Chakma (FIFA referee)
- Rudmeela Nawsheen (technology)
- Ismat Ara (entrepreneurship)
- Tropa Mazumder (acting and directing)
