= Anannya =

Women's Bengali-language magazine

- Editor-in-Chief: Tasmima Hossain
- Categories: Women's magazine
- Frequency: Fortnightly
- Total circulation: 20,000 (2003)
- Founded: 1987
- Country: Bangladesh
- Language: Bengali
- Website: anannya.com.bd

Anannya is a women's Bengali-language magazine published fortnightly in Bangladesh since 1987. The magazine has notably championed the role of women in Bangladesh society with its annual awards, which have been given since 1993.

The magazine is noted for its annual awards Anannya Top Ten Awards to outstanding women and Anannya Literature Award for contribution to literature in Bangladesh since 1993.
