= Rizia Rahman =

Bangladeshi novelist (1939–2019)

- রিজিয়া রহমান
- Born: 28 December 1939; Bhabanipur, Kolkata, Bengal Presidency, British India
- Died: 16 August 2019 (aged 79); Dhaka, Bangladesh
- Occupation: Writer

Rizia Rahman (28 December 1939 – 16 August 2019) was a Bangladeshi novelist. She had a number of novels and short stories to her credit. Her works cut across all genres. She was best known for the novel Bong Theke Bangla. She was the recipient of Bangla Academy Literary Award (1978). As of 2018, she had published more than 50 novels and short story collections during her long career.

== Early life ==
Rizia Rahman was born on 28 December 1939 in Bhabanipur, Kolkata. Her family moved to Bangladesh, then known as East Bengal, after the 1947 Partition of India. She began writing stories at the age of 8 and was published for the first time when she was 12. Her stories and poems appeared in newspapers such as Satyajug and Sangbad. Rahman studied at the University of Dhaka and graduated with a Master of Social Sciences in Economics.

== Career ==
Rahman published her first collection of short stories, Agni Shakkora, while studying at the University of Dhaka. Her novel Bong Theke Bangla was published in 1978 to critical acclaim, exploring the evolution of Bangladesh's nationality and language. Her fourth novel, Rokter Okkhor, was inspired by an article called "The Prostitutes of Dhaka" which was published in Bichitra. She was unable to conduct research for the book by visiting brothels herself, relying instead on weekly reports from a male journalist to gain an understanding of a sex worker's living conditions. It created a huge stir in Bangladesh upon publication because of its frank depiction of prostitution in the country. In a 2016 translation of the book named Letters of Blood, Rahman said, "I received a lot of praise for the book, but also had to endure an equal amount of abuse."

== Works ==
Novels

- Uttar Purush (Posterity, 1977)
- Rokter Okkhor (Letters of Blood , 1978)
- Bong Theke Bangla (Bengali to Bangla, 1978)
- Alikhito Upakhyan (An Unwritten Story, 1980)
- Surja Sabuj Rakta (Sun Green Blood, 1980)
- Shhilay Shilay Agun (Stones in Fire, 1980)
- Aranyer Kache (Near the Forest, 1980)
- Dhabal Jyotsna (White Moon-light, 1980)
- Ghar-Bhanga-Ghar (Broken-house, 1984)
- Ekal Chirokal (Now and Eternity, 1984)
- Prem Amar Prem (Love, My Love, 1985)
- Jharer Mukhomukhi (Facing the Storm, 1986)
- Ekti Phuler Janya (For a Flower, 1986)
- Shudhu Tomader Janya (Only for You, 1988)
- He manab Manabi (Oh! Man and Woman, 1989)
- Harun Phereni (Harun did not Return, 1994)
- Nodi Nirobodhi (2011)

=== Translated novels (English) ===
- Letters of Blood (Rokter Okkhor, 2016)

Short stories

- Dura Kothao (2004)
- Caged in Paradise and Other Stories (2010)

== Awards ==
- Bangla Academy Literary Award (1978)
- Jessore Sahitya Parishad Puraskar (1984)
- Bangladesh Lekhak Sangha Sahitya Padak (1985)
- Kamar Mushtari Sahitya Padak (1990)
- Anannya Literature Award (1995)
- Humayun Kadir Sriti Puraskar
- Jasimuddin Shwarna Padak
- Shawgat Shwarna Padak
- Ekushey Padak (2019)

== Death ==
Rahman died on 16 August 2019.
