= Prachyanat =

Theatre group in Bangladesh

- Prachyanat - প্রাচ্যনাট
- Founded: 1997
- Founder: Azad Abul Kalam
- Type: Theatre
- Headquarters: 278/3, Kataban Dhal, New Elephant Road, Dhaka 1205. (Beside Ashta Byanjan Hotel)
- Location: Kataban, Dhaka
- Region served: Worldwide
- Product: Promote knowledge of Art and culture through performance.
- Website: https://prachyanat.com

Prachyanat is a theatre group of Bangladesh founded in 1997.

== Productions ==
In the last twenty five years Prachyanat had fifteen full length productions. Among these, two plays are written by the members of Prachyanat. One play of Prachyanat is a translated version of A Man for All Seasons, by the British playwright Robert Bolt. Another play of Prachyanat is "Gondar" (The Rhinoceros) from playwright Eugene Ionesco. In 2009 Prachyanat brought out a modernist version of Rabindranath’s symbolic play Raja ebong Onnanno. In 2009, Ibsen’s play "Punarjonmo" was made. Another is "The Hairy Ape", which is written by Eugene O'Neill and directed by Barker Bakul. Koinna, a play which is directed by Azad Abul Kalam, Murad Khan's script is based on a myth from the north-west of Bangladesh about ‘Koinnapir’. A play titled "Kinu Kaharer Thetar" is performed which is written by Manoj Mitra and directed by Kaji Taufiqul Islam Imon. In 2010, Prachyanat staged titled "Mayer Mukh", a translation of Arnold Wesker’s play. In the year of 2014, Prachyanat produced a play titled "Tragedy of Polashbari", script and directed by Azad Abul Kalam.

== Prachyanat Musical Ensemble ==
Prachyanat has a strong musical team. Prachyanat Musical Ensemble is a group with a fluid membership, mostly theatre performers with musical abilities rather than professional musicians. Its first performance was in 2002. It specializes in the folk music of Bangladesh and West Bengal, and also renders popular songs from Prachyanat's plays, such as "Matitey Milay Matir Manush" from A Man for All Seasons, and others from Circus Circus and Koinya.

The musical ensemble took their production Phul, Phaki O Nodi'r Gaan (Music of the flowers, birds and rivers) on tour to Kathmandu, Nepal. The five-day tour in July 2009 was at the invitation of the out-going Bangladeshi Ambassador, Imtiaz Ahmed. Pieces performed included Shah Abdul Karim's song "Jhilmil jhilmil" as well as new compositions. According to a review in The Himalayan Times, "most of the numbers had an ethnic folk touch and the musicians played traditional as well as modern instruments".
