= Anwara Syed Haq =

Bangladeshi writer and psychiatrist

- আনোয়ারা সৈয়দ হক
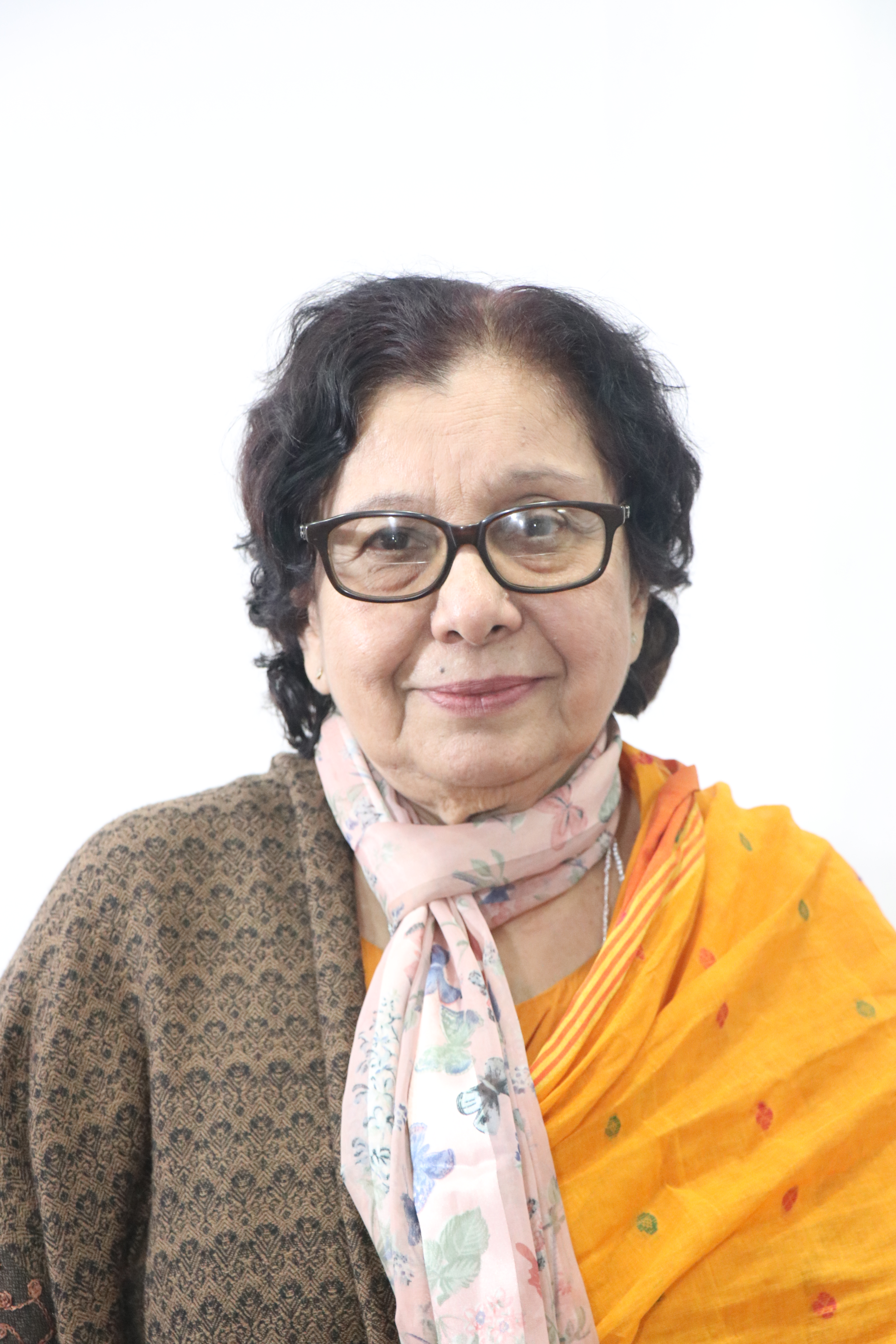
- Haq in 2019
- Born: Anwara Begum; 1940 (age 85–86); Jessore, Bengal Province, British India
- Education: Dhaka Medical College
- Spouse: Syed Shamsul Haque (m. 1965)
- Children: 2
- Awards: Full list

Anwara Begum (known by her pen name Anwara Syed Haq; born 1940) is a writer of Bangla literature. She has written a number of novels, short stories, children's books and also written a number of essays. She has been praised for using her knowledge of human psychology beautifully in her writings. She is a psychiatrist by profession. She was awarded Bangla Academy Literary Award in 2009 and Ekushey Padak in 2019 by the government of Bangladesh for her contribution to the language and literature.

== Early life ==
Anwara Syed Haq was born into a conservative Muslim family in the town of Jessore. She passed her childhood and teenage years in Jessore. Her father was a very pious man and insisted that she observe religious customs. She rarely had the opportunity to read novels, magazines or literary material in her school and college days. Her father's wish was that she would study medicine whereas her wish was that she would study English literature. To fulfill her father's wish she moved to Dhaka in 1959 and enrolled in Dhaka Medical College. Haq then went to the United Kingdom to attend post graduate education in medicine.

== Academic career ==
After completing her SSC and HSC in Jessore, Haq moved to Dhaka in 1959 and enrolled in Dhaka Medical College. She obtained her MBBS degree in 1965. In 1973 went to the United Kingdom for higher education. After having completed her post graduate degree in medical psychiatry in 1982 she returned home from the UK. She has since then worked at a number of institutions, among which are Pakistan Air Force, Dhaka Medical College and BIRDEM. Now she works professionally as a psychiatrist.

== Personal life ==
Anwara Syed Haq married writer and poet Syed Shamsul Haq on 19 November 1965. They have one daughter and one son. Her daughter Bidita teaches English literature at higher school level. Her son Ditio is an IT specialist, writes stories, lyrics and music.

== Awards ==
- Anannya Literature Award (2006)
- Bangla Academy Literary Award (2009)
- Agrani Bank Puroshkar
- Michael Madhushudhon Puroshkar
- Shishu Academy Puroshkar
- Ekushey Padak (2019)

== Literary works ==
Haq's first short story "Paribartan" was published in Sangbad in 1954. From 1955 to 1957, she regularly wrote for Ittefaque's "Kachi Kanchar Ashor". Her first novel was published in Sachitra Shandhani in 1968. After her first novel, she has written a number of novels and short stories. Many of her novels are set in Dhaka and London where she spent much of her time. Her publications consist of twenty-five novels, three volumes of poems, eight collections of short stories, eight collections of essays, three autobiography volumes, two collections of travel writing, forty fictional stories for young readers.

- Bari O Banita
- Shei Prem Shei Shomoy
- Udoy Mina-ke Chay
- Bhalo-bashar Laal Pipre
- Osthirotar Kaal Bhalo-bashar Shomoy

=== Children's stories ===
- Ekjon Muktijoddhar Chhele (Bengali: একজন মুক্তিযোদ্ধার ছেলে]
- Montir Baba (Bengali: মন্টির বাবা]
- Tomader Janno Egaroti (Bengali: তোমাদের জন্য এগারোটি]
- Ulto Payer Bhoot (Bengali: উল্টো পায়ের ভূত]
- Ami Babake Bhalobasi (Bengali: আমি বাবাকে ভালোবাসি]
- Hanadar Bahini Jobdo (Bengali: হানাদার বাহিনী জব্দ]
- Amar Ma Shobcheye Bhalo
