= Dilara Hashem =

Bangladeshi author (1935–2022)

- দিলারা হাশেম
- Born: Dilara Khanom; 25 August 1935; Jessore, Bengal Province, British India
- Died: 19 March 2022 (aged 85); Rockville, Maryland, US
- Education: University of Dhaka
- Occupations: Novelist and broadcaster
- Children: 3
- Awards: Bangla Academy Literary Award
- Website: dilarahashem.com

Dilara Hashem (née Khanom, 25 August 1935 – 19 March 2022) was a Bangladeshi author and novelist. She was among the first Bengali writers to receive Bangla Academy Literary Award in 1976 for her contribution in literature. Her notable works include Ekada Ebang Ananta, Stabdhatar Kane Kane, Amlakir Mou, Badami Bikeler Galpa, Kaktaliya, Shangkha Karat, Anukta Padabali, Sadar Andar and Setu.

== Early life ==
Dilara Khanom was born on 25 August 1936 in Jessore in the then Bengal Province, British India to Shawkat Ara Khanom and Bazlur Rahman Khan. She had two brothers and four sisters including Dilshad Khanom, Suraiya Khanom and Shamimah Harun. She earned her master's in English literature from the University of Dhaka.

== Career ==
After completing her education, Hashem joined the then Radio Pakistan as a Bangla news presenter. Later, she joined as news presenter at Bangladesh Betar and Bangladesh Television. After the independence of Bangladesh in 1971, she worked temporarily as radio broadcaster for BBC Bangla and Voice of America (VOA) in 1972. She joined fulltime the Bangla section of the VOA in 1976 and worked until her retirement in 2011.

Hashem's debut novel Ghar Man Janala (trans: Home, Heart, Window) was published in 1965. It was translated to Russian and Chinese languages and adapted into a film in 1973.

In mid-1970s, Hashem was one of the group of 1100 women who became part of a class-action sex-discrimination lawsuit against the United States Information Agency (then overseer of the VOA). She alleged systemic gender discrimination at the Voice of America, claiming she was repeatedly denied career advancement in favor of lesser-qualified men and was ultimately replaced in a 1975 role under the pretext of budget cuts. After 23 years of litigation, in 2000, United States Department of State reached a settlement with the group and Hashem was awarded more than $200,000 in back pay and interest as part of the settlement.

== Works ==
=== Novels ===
- Ghar Mon Janala (Houses, Hearts and Windows, 1965)
- Ekoda Ebong Ananto (Once and Ever, 1975)
- Stabdhatar Kane Kane (Whispering to Silence, 1977)
- Amlokir Mou (The Sweet from the Bitterest, 1978)
- Badami Bikeler Galpo (Stories of a Brown Afternoon, 1983);
- Kaktaleya (Coincident, 1985)
- Mural (1986)
- Shankho Korat (Horns of a Dilemma 1995)
- Anukta Padaboli (Unspoken Verses, 1998)
- Sador Andor (Outer and Inner Part, 1998)
- Setu (Bridge, 2000)

== Awards ==
- Bangla Academy Literary Award (1976)
- Shankhachil Sahitya Puraskar by North American Literary Society (1994)
- Cultural and Literary Inc (1995)
- Anannya Literature Award (1998)
- Chokh Literary Award (2000)
- Bango Smmelan (Indian) Award (2000)
- Sarojini Naidu - Gold Medal for Literature (2003)
- Uttar Chicago Shitya Puraskar (1997)
- Alakto Gold Medal for Literature (2004)
- Muktadhhara–GFB Literary Award (2019)

== Personal life and death ==
Dilara Hashem had three daughters Nausheen Hashem, Seemeen Hashem, and Tahseen Hashem. Hashem lived in Bethesda, Maryland, US.

Hashem died from congestive heart failure in a hospital in Rockville, Maryland on 19 March 2022 at the age of 86.
