= Anandadhara =

Anandadhara is a fortnightly entertainment magazine in Bangladesh. The magazine is published by Mahfuz Anam, who is also the editor of The Daily Star.

== History ==
Anandadhara was founded in May 1998 as a film industry magazine. Shahadat Chowdhury, editor of Bichitra, was the founding editor of Anandadhara. The magazine started the Lux Anandadhara Miss Bangladesh Photogenic which is the forerunner to the Lux Channel i Superstar. In June 2011, the magazine editor Arun Chowdhury was replaced by Moinul Ahsan Saber the editor of Shaptahik 2000.
