= Desh Aaj Bishwabehayar Khappare =

1988 poster by Quamrul Hassan

- Artist: Quamrul Hassan
- Year: 1988
- Type: Sketch
- Subject: Hussain Muhammad Ershad

Desh Aaj Bishwabehayar Khappare is a political sketch by Quamrul Hassan. Created in 1988 on the eve of the 1990 Bangladesh mass uprising, the drawing sketches Bangladesh's then-president Hussain Muhammad Ershad.

== Creation ==
In the 1980s, Bangladesh's poets became divided over rule of president Hussain Muhammad Ershad. In 1987, Kabita Kendra, formed by Ershad's supporters, organized the Asian Poetry Festival, while his opponents formed the Jatiya Kabita Parishad, which organized the National Poetry Festival at the time. On 2 February 1988, during the Second National Poetry Festival held at the University of Dhaka, poet Rabindra Gope handed a sketchbook to presiding Quamrul Hassan, requesting him to draw something. In that sketchbook, Hassan drew a sketch of Ershad. After finishing the drawing, Hassan stood on the stage and told the audience through the microphone, "দেশ আজ বিশ্ববেহায়ার খপ্পরে" (Desh Aaj Bishwabehayar Khappare, lit. 'Today the Country in the Clutches of the Shameless of the World'). Shortly after that, suddenly he suffered a heart attack and died. The artwork remained with Gope and was later printed at a press in Dhaka. Afterwards, under the leadership of poet Mohan Raihan, copies of the artwork were distributed across the country.

== Reception and legacy ==
The sketch, opposing Ershad's dictatorship, became hugely popular after its release, comparable to Hassan's 1971 poster Annihilate These Demons. After the drawing, president Ershad became known as the "Bishwabehaya" (lit. 'the greatest shameless'). It helped increase the momentum of the 1990 Bangladesh mass uprising. According to poet Hasan Hafiz, creating the sketch at that time was an audacious act. Journalist Golam Mortoza noted that, since Ershad had become "a leading character in humorous tales", the artwork accurately portrayed his character. According to writer Syed Azizul Haque, this is "remarkable as a sign of the painter's political awareness and patriotism." In 2025, the artwork was included in the sixth-grade Bangladeshi textbook Charupath (lit. 'art lesson'), in the chapter "Language of Cartoons, Caricatures, and Posters".
