= The Dream and Lie of Franco =

Prints by Pablo Picasso

- Sueño y mentira de Franco (Spanish)
- The second sheet of the artwork
- Artist: Pablo Picasso
- Year: 1937
- Type: Etching and aquatint
- Dimensions: (12 7/16 in × 16 1/2 in)
- Owner: The Metropolitan Museum of Art

The Dream and Lie of Franco (Spanish: Sueño y mentira de Franco) is a series of prints produced by the Spanish artist Pablo Picasso in 1937. It comprises two sheets of 18 individual images and an accompanying prose poem. The sheets each contain nine images arranged in a 3x3 grid. The first 14, in etching and aquatint, are dated 8 January 1937. The remaining four images were added to the second printing plate later, without use of aquatint, and dated June 7, 1937.

The Dream and Lie of Franco is significant as Picasso's first overtly political work and prefigures his iconic political painting Guernica. The etchings satirise Spanish Generalísimo Francisco Franco's claim to represent and defend conservative Spanish culture and values by showing him in various ridiculous guises, while destroying Spain and its culture. The poem denounces "evil-omened polyps". Three of the four images added in June 1937 are directly related to studies for Guernica.

The individual images were originally intended to be published as postcards to raise funds for the Spanish Republican government, and sold at the Spanish Pavilion of the 1937 World's Fair, although it is unclear whether any prints were made or sold in postcard format.

In his review of the etchings for The Spectator in October 1937, art historian (and member of the Cambridge Five spy-ring) Anthony Blunt complained that the work could not "reach more than the limited coterie of aesthetes". Critic and author John Golding on the other hand, claimed that "more than any other work by Picasso Dream and Lie of Franco breaks down, as the Surrealists so passionately longed to, distinctions between thought, writing and visual imagery."

== Images ==
The images form a sequence like those in a comic book (in particular, the Spanish auca) and have a loose narrative: Franco's form changes from panel to panel. The Spanish dictator's appearance has been likened by various writers to a "jackbooted phallus", "an evil-omened polyp" and "a grotesque homunculus with a head like a gesticulating and tuberous sweet potato".

1. Franco riding a horse waving a sword and a flag
2. Franco, with a ridiculously large penis, waving a sword and a flag
3. Franco attacking a classical sculpture with a pick
4. Franco dressed as a courtesan with a flower and a fan
5. Franco being gored by a bull
6. Franco at prayer surrounded by barbed wire
7. Franco on top of a dead creature
8. Franco chasing a winged horse
9. Franco riding on a pig carrying a spear
10. Franco eating a dead horse
11. The aftermath of a battle with a corpse
12. The aftermath of a battle with a dead horse
13. Franco and a bull
14. Franco and the bull fighting

Additions to the second plate (including studies for Guernica):

1. A woman crying and reaching up
2. A woman fleeing a burning house carrying a child
3. A woman cradling a child
4. A woman shot with an arrow and reaching up amid devastation

== See also ==
- Annihilate these demons, similar work by Quamrul Hassan

== Selected bibliography ==
- Schuldiner, Michael (Autumn 2016). "Narrative Markers in Pablo Picasso's Tragicomic Strip, The Dream and Lie of Franco". European Comic Art. 9 (3): 6–26. doi:10.3167/eca.2016.090202.
