= Golam Mortoza =

Bangladeshi journalist and media professional

- গোলাম মর্তুজা
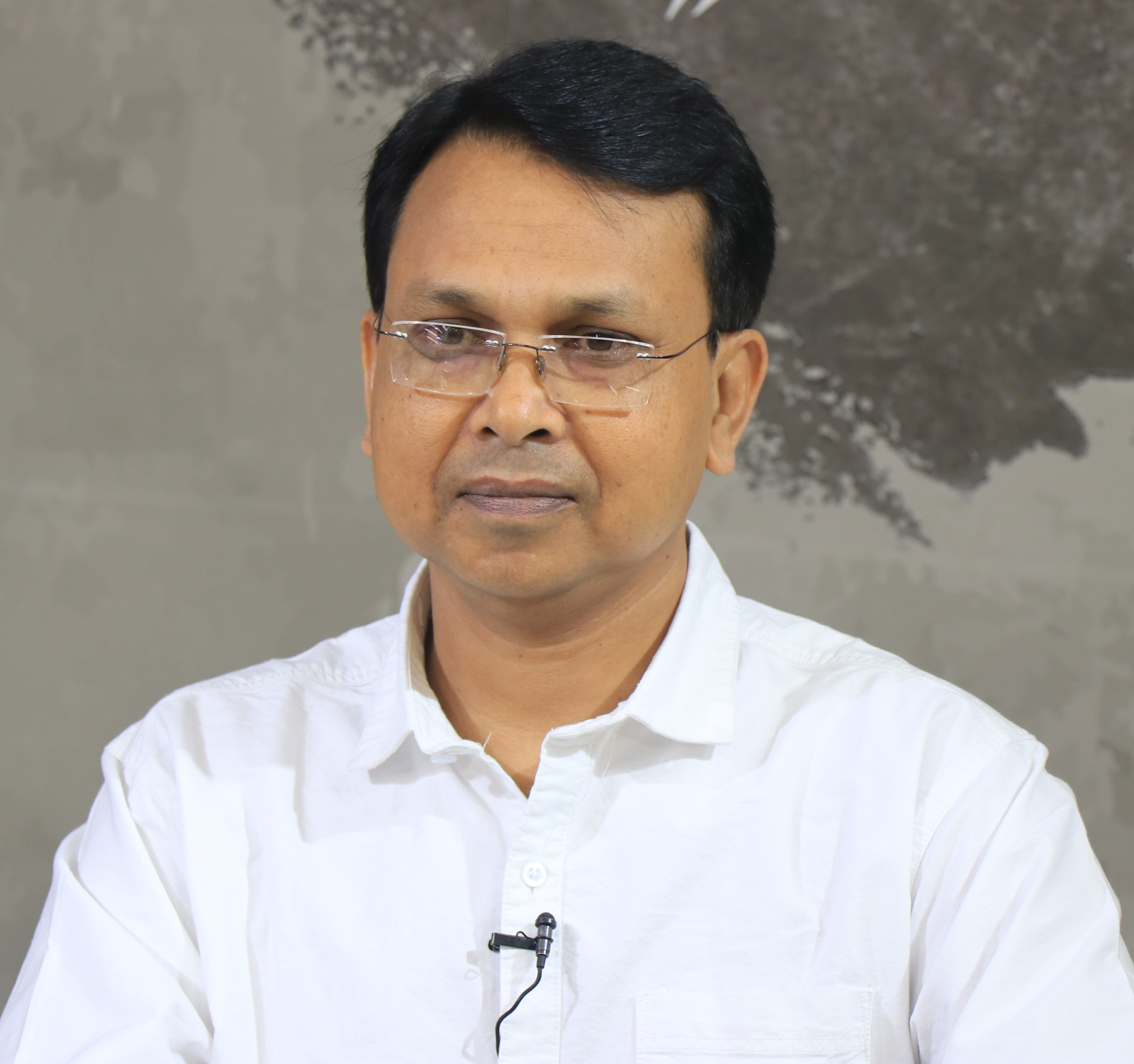

Press Minister at the Bangladesh Embassy in the United States
- Incumbent
- Assumed office 2024
- Appointed by: Government of Bangladesh
- Preceded by: AZM Sajjad Hossain

Personal details
- Occupation: Journalist, Media Professional
- Known for: Editor of Daily Star Bangla

Golam Mortoza is a Bangladeshi journalist and media professional, currently serving as the Press Minister at the Bangladesh Embassy in the United States. He is the former editor of the Bengali section of The Daily Star.

== Early life ==
Mortoza's father was Abdul Barik. He was born in Mahendrapur, Rajbari District. He has three brothers and two sisters.

== Career ==
In 2004, Mortoza worked for the Shaptahik 2000, a weekly magazine. He filed a complaint with the police seeking protection after receiving death threats.

In 2018, Mortoza debunked a news article alleging corruption against former Prime Minister Khaleda Zia. He was the editor of Shaptahik.

Mortoza served as the editor of Daily Star Bangla, the Bengali-language edition of The Daily Star, one of Bangladesh's leading newspapers. In June 2024, he called for respecting the history of Grameen Bank and its founder Muhmmad Yunus. He wrote against government action during the 2024 Bangladesh quota reform movement, which he called a non-political movement

Mortoza was appointed Press Minister at the Bangladesh Embassy in the United States by the Ministry of Public Administration in November 2024 after the fall of the Sheikh Hasina-led Awami League government for a two-year term replacing AZM Sajjad Hossain. At the same time, BBC journalist Akbar Hossain Mojumdar was appointed press minister at the Bangladesh High Commission in the United Kingdom, replacing Md Ashikun Nabi Chowdhury and editor of Bangla Outlook, Faisal Mahmud, was appointed press minister at the High Commission of Bangladesh to India replacing Shaban Mahmud. The Muhammad Yunus-led interim government dismissed all three of their predecessors. He met with the Electoral Reform Commission of the interim government and asked them to investigate the previous three elections. His appointment drew critical comments and questions over his lack of journalistic work in the English Language. His appointment was seen as part of a larger trend of appointing loyalists of Muhmmad Yunus to government positions.

In April 2025, Mortoza made public remarks during the controversy surrounding Deepto TV’s temporary suspension of news broadcasts. He criticized the conduct of a reporter whose questioning of Cultural Adviser Mustafa Sarwar Farooqi drew backlash. Mortoza stated that the journalist's behaviour demonstrated sycophancy and that such conduct undermines the integrity of the press.

== Bibliography ==
- Fazle Hasan Abed O BRAC
- Shanti Bahini
- Shahadat Chowdhury memorial book
- Bhule Nai, Bhule Nai
- Faisal Arefin Deepan memorial Book
- Words of Wisdom
- News and journalist
- 71 in the heart
