= Liberation War Museum =

Museum in Dhaka, Bangladesh

Coordinates: 23.7319°N 90.4068°E

- মুক্তিযুদ্ধ জাদুঘর

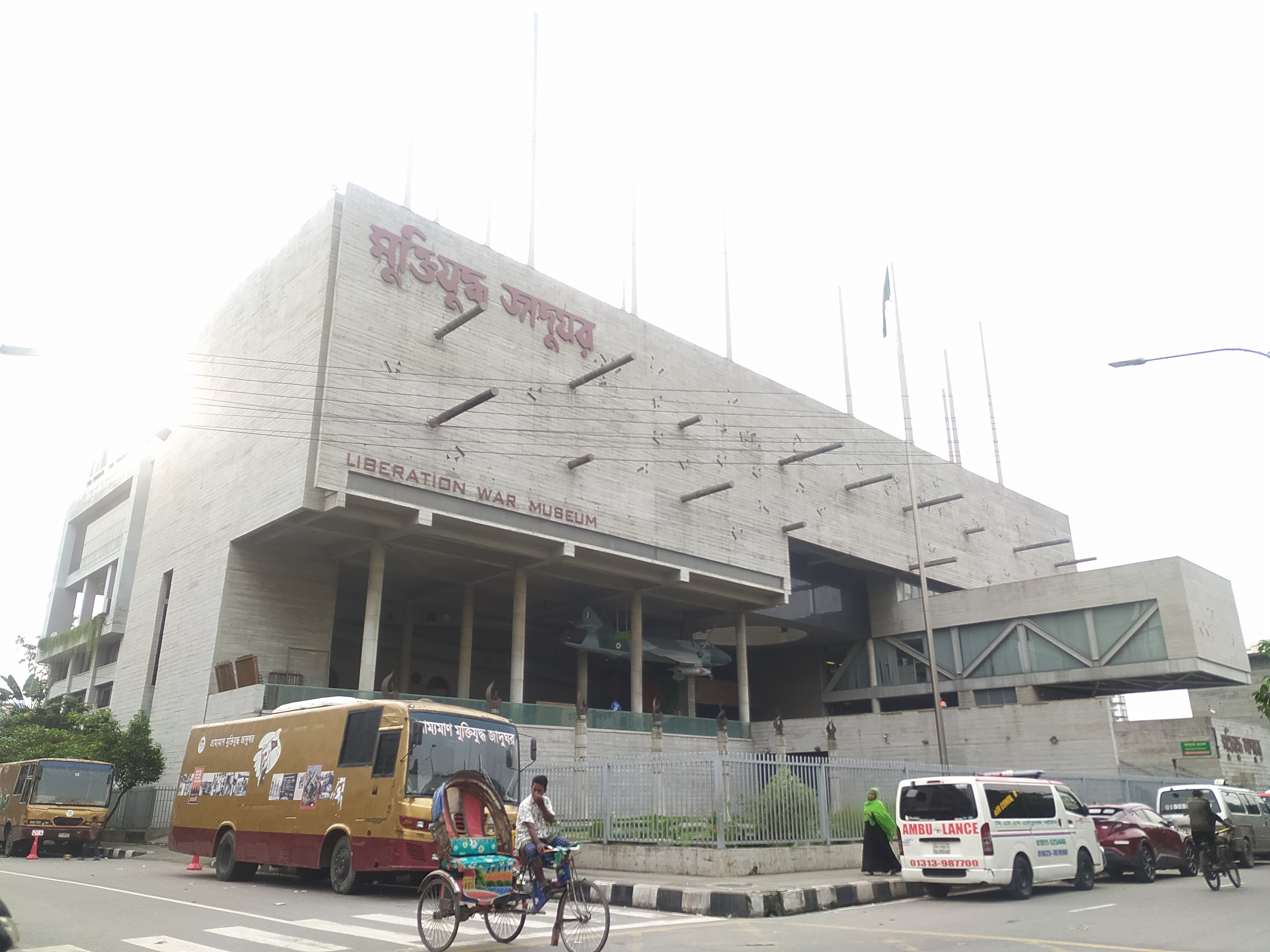
- Liberation War Museum in 2024
- Established: 22 March 1996
- Location: F11/A & F11/B, Sher-e Bangla Nagar Civic Centre, Agargaon, Dhaka
- Collection size: 21,000 artifacts
- Website: liberationwarmuseumbd.org

The Liberation War Museum (Bengali: মুক্তিযুদ্ধ জাদুঘর, romanized: Muktijuddho Jadughôr) is a museum at Agargaon in Dhaka, the capital of Bangladesh, which commemorates the Bangladesh Liberation War that led to the independence of Bangladesh from Pakistan.

== History ==
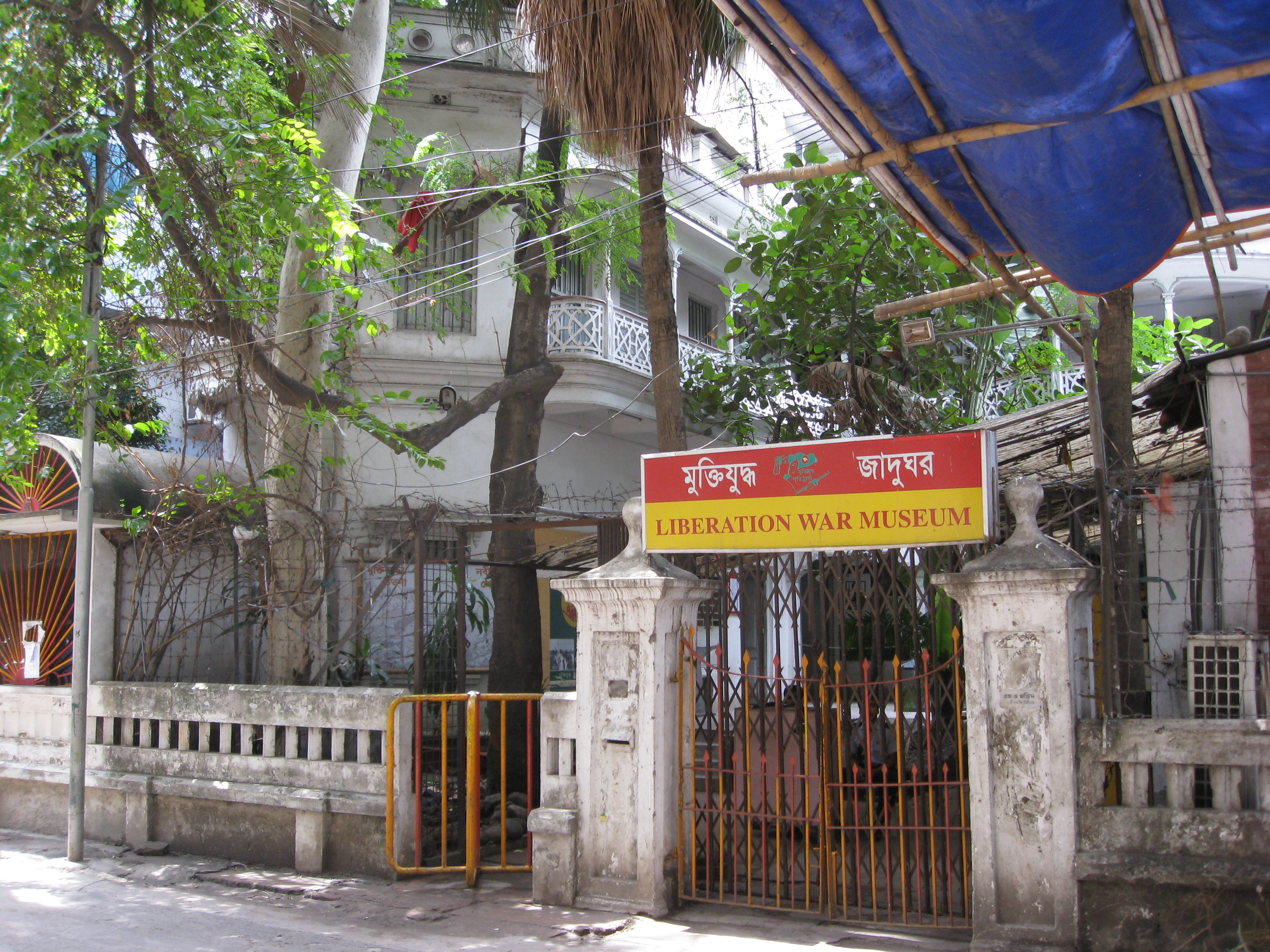
Liberation War Museum before the relocation at the permanent building

The Liberation War Museum began under the initiative of an eight-person board of trustees as a means of preserving memories of the 1971 Liberation War. The trustees sought donations from the general public to fund the museum and to provide artifacts from the war to be displayed, including personal belongings, weapons and human remains. They also created an archive of documents and personal histories related to the war. Over the years, the museum has collected more than 21,000 artifacts (as of 2016); some are part of exhibits on display in the museum and many more are stored in its archives. The museum describes itself as "the outcome of a citizens' effort", referring to the crowd-funded nature of the museum, which is independent of the Government of Bangladesh. The general public has made an expansive, collective contribution to the museum's holdings.

=== Relocation ===
Due to a lack of space, it was possible to display only a fraction of the collected artifacts at the original premises. The museum decided that bigger and more modern premises were required.

In 2009, an architectural contest was held for the design of the newmuseum; architects Tanzim Hasan Salim and Naheed Farzana won first prize for their designs. In 2013, land was acquired in Agargaon for the new building and construction began. The new premises of the Liberation War Museum were officially opened on 16 April 2017. The new building provided much more space, with 3500 square meters of gallery space.

== Galleries ==
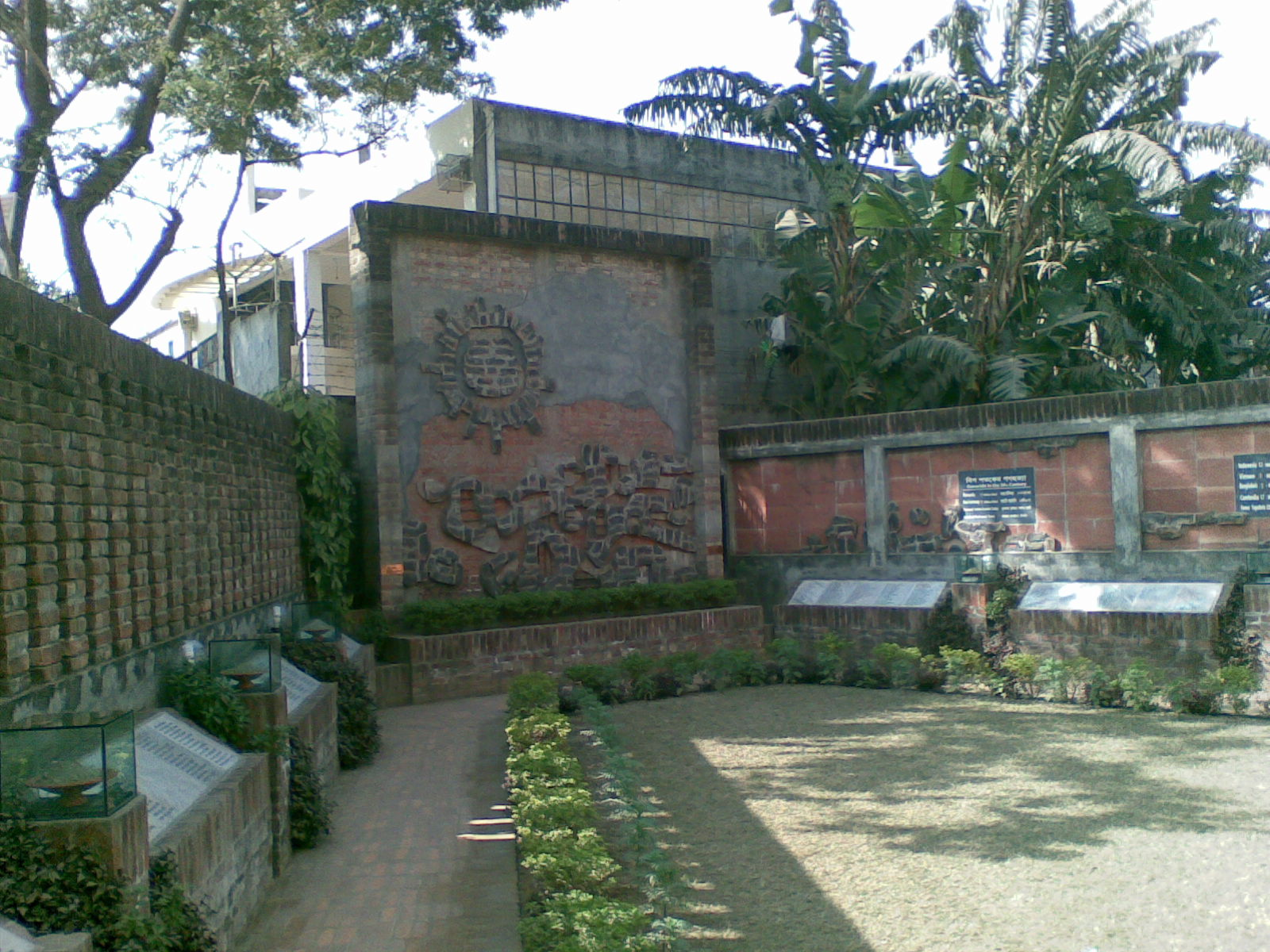
The Jallad Khana memorial at one of the killing fields in Mirpur is maintained by the museum.

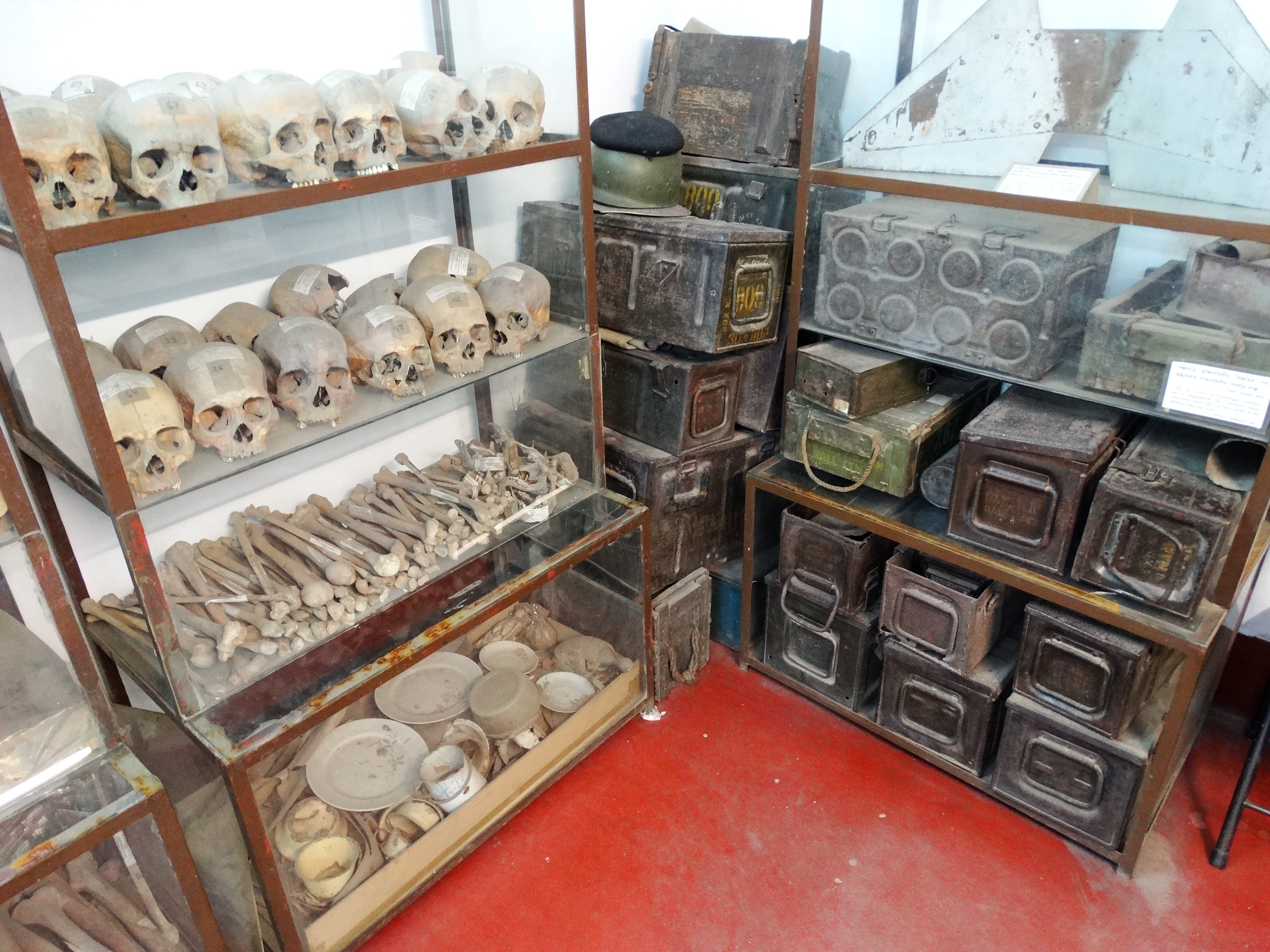
Exhibition from the old premises of the LWM containing human remains and war materials.

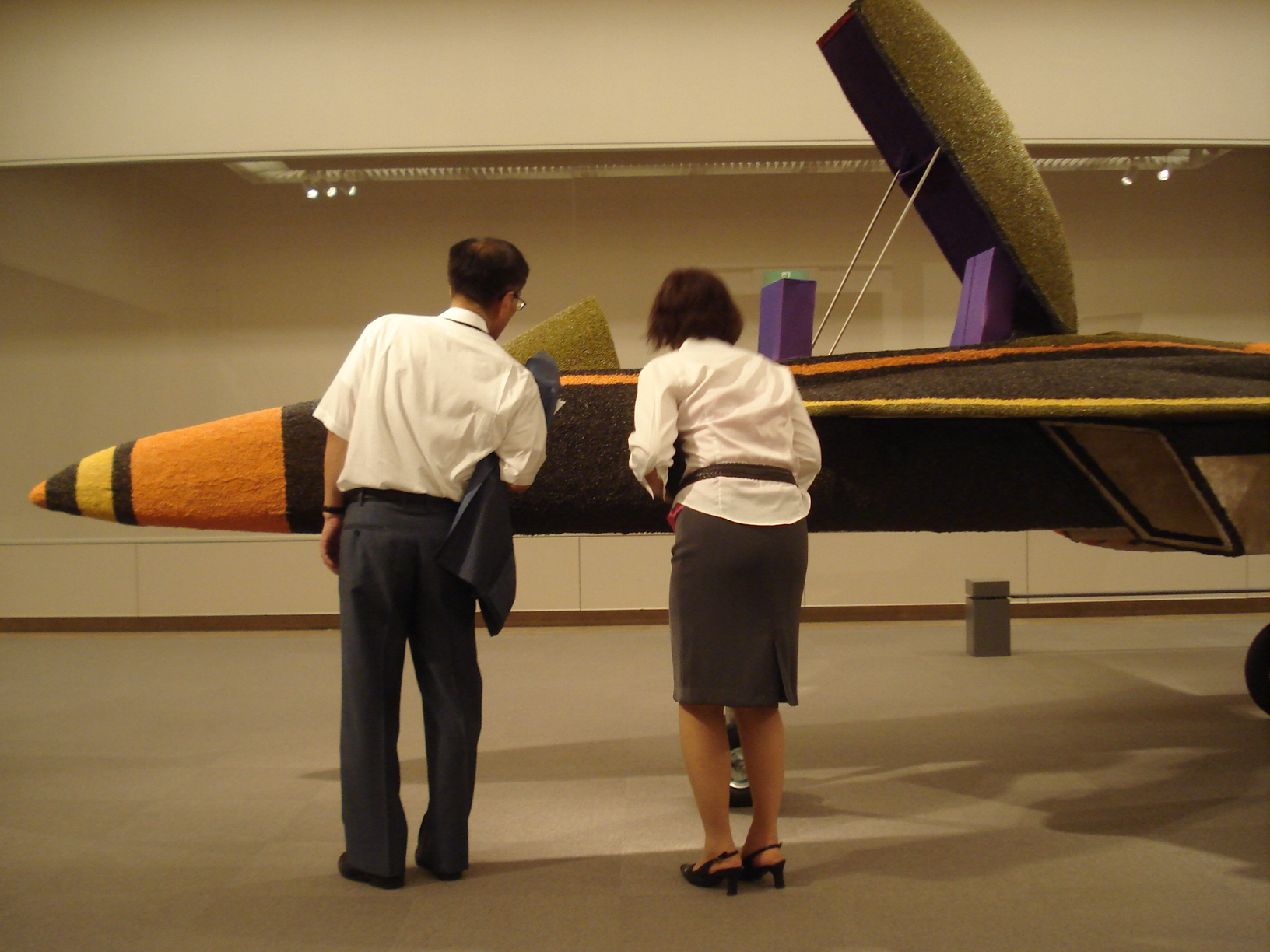
The 'Sucker'wfp21' art project of artist Firoz Mahmud was partially collaborated by the Liberation War Museum & EMK center Bangladesh–United States relations. Exhibited at Aichi Arts Center, Nagoya, Japan & EMK center, Dhaka

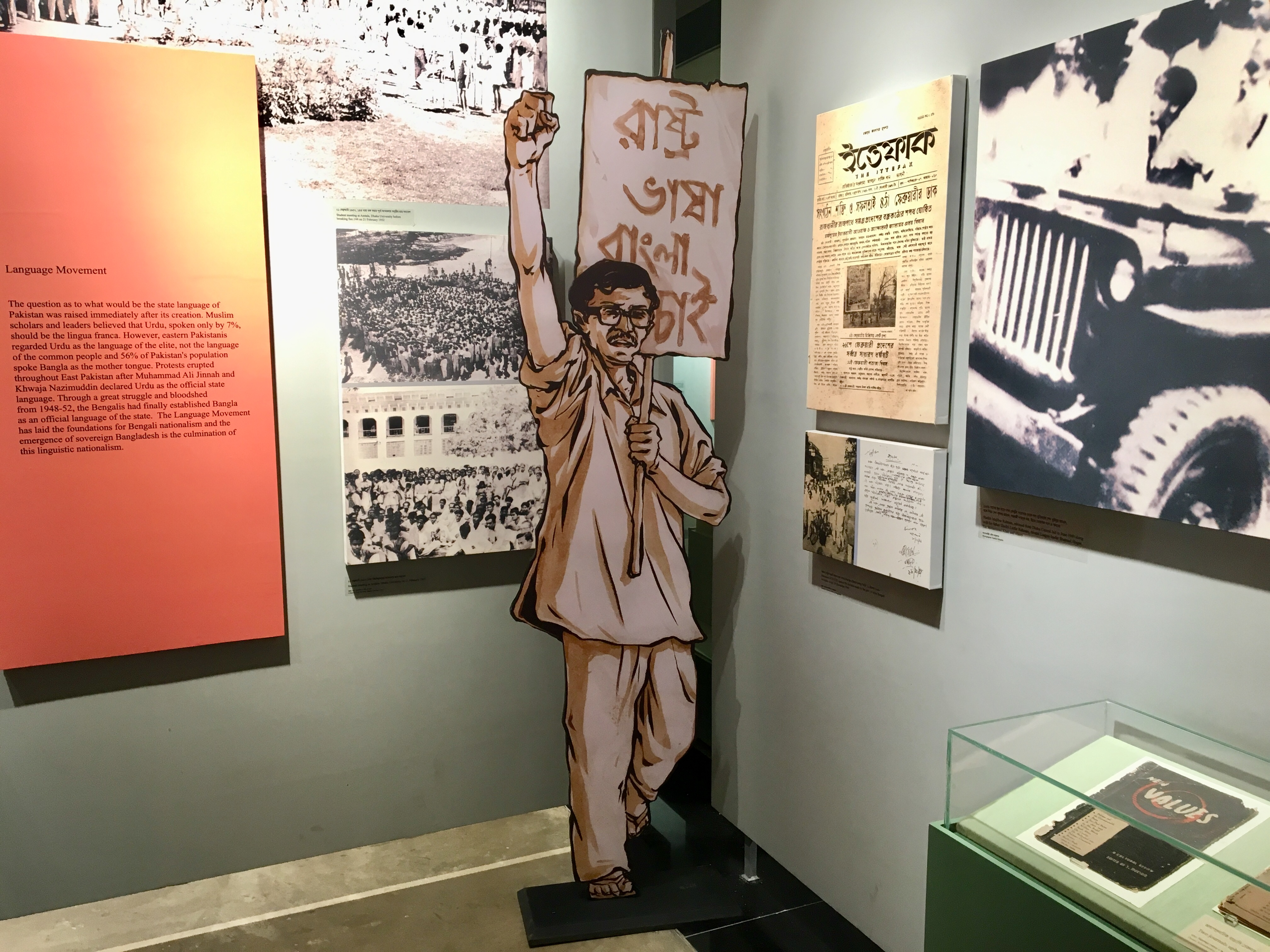
2D and 3D pictorial presentation on Language Movement in 1952.

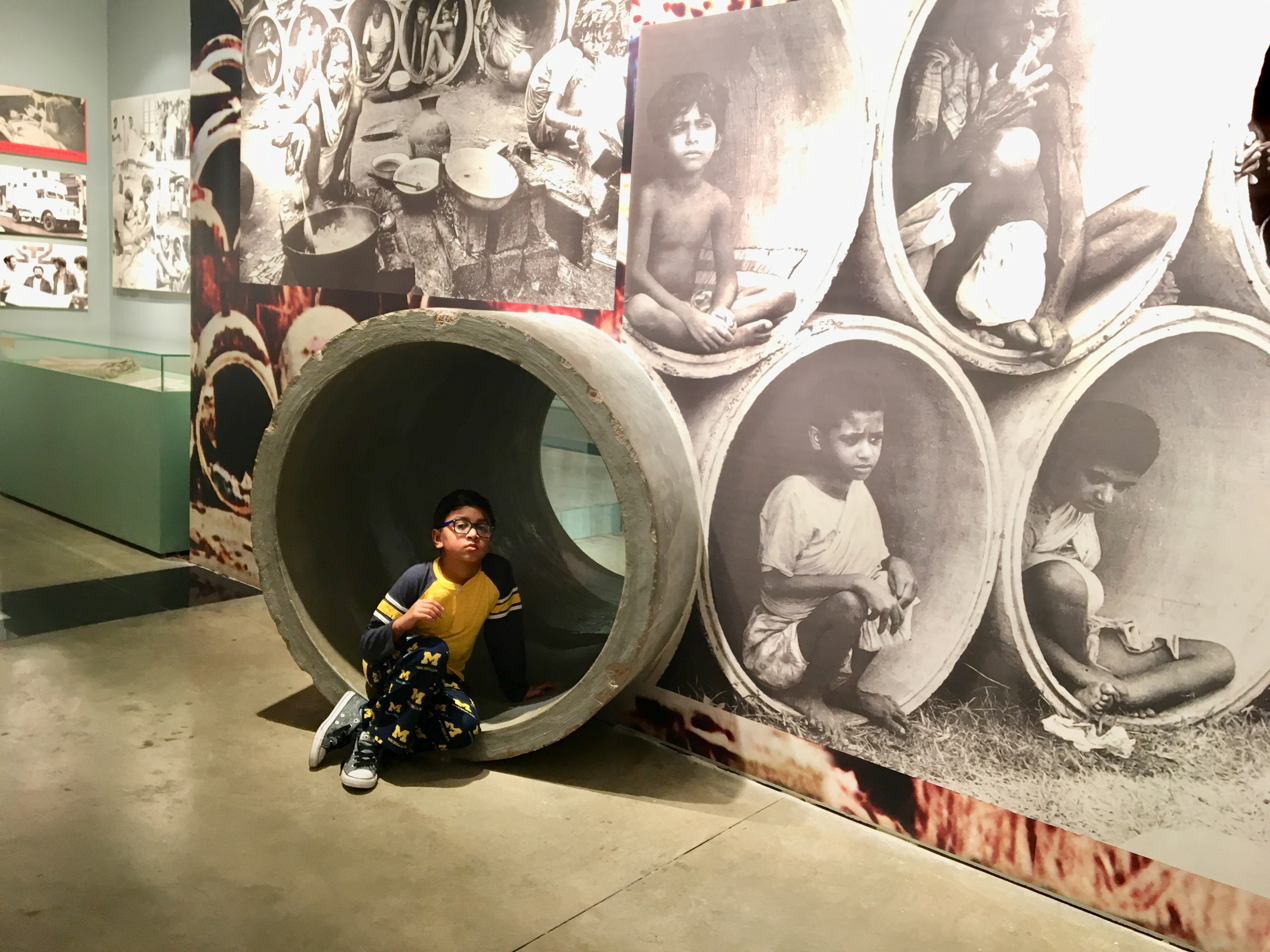
Real life demonstration of refugee camps in India

Note: These paragraphs relate specifically to the galleries of the older (pre-2017) premises.

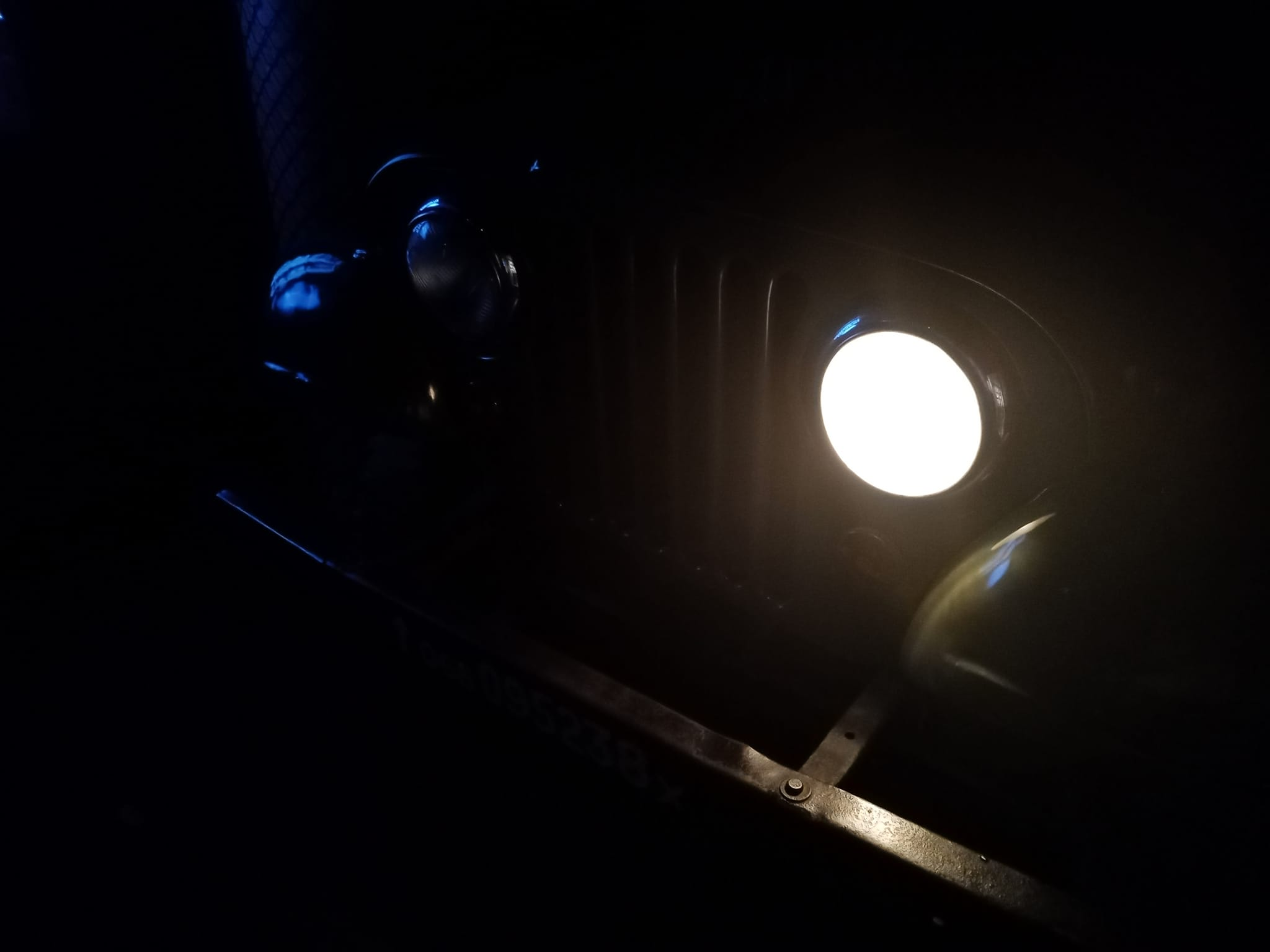
Depiction of Operation Searchlight

The galleries begin with coverage of the early history of Bangladesh and the Indian independence movement against British Raj in Bengal. A major section records the events of the Language Movement for the recognition of the Bengali language in Pakistan, which is regarded as the beginning of the movement for Bangladesh's independence. Several galleries highlight the building sectional conflict between West Pakistan and Bangladesh (then East Pakistan), the rise of Bengali nationalist leader Sheikh Mujibur Rahman and the events of 1971, when the postponement by Pakistan's military ruler Gen. Yahya Khan of the convening of the National Assembly of Pakistan, in which Sheikh Mujib's Awami League had won a majority, led to the call for the independence of Bangladesh.

The coverage of the liberation war includes the training and operations of the Mukti Bahini, the guerrilla army built by the Awami League to resist Pakistani forces. Several galleries focus on the genocide carried out by the Pakistani army against the Bengali population, with Operation Searchlight targeting Bengali intellectuals, students, Hindus and Awami League leaders, and the humanitarian crisis created with the pouring of an estimated ten million refugees into neighbouring India.

The coverage of the war continues to India's support for the Mukti Bahini and its subsequent direct intervention with the outbreak of the Indo-Pakistani War of 1971, which led to the surrender of all Pakistani forces in Bangladesh on 16 December 1971.

The galleries display the weapons used by the Mukti Bahini, personal effects of many Mukti Bahini fighters and civilian victims of the atrocities committed by Pakistani forces, many donated by their families after the conflict. Also displayed are remains of human skulls and bones retrieved from mass graves of civilians killed by Pakistani forces.

== Activities ==
The museum is involved in a number of outreach and reachout programs. These include programs working with schools to educate the youth about the Liberation War as well as regular conferences and seminars within the museum premises. The museum also supported for varied art and cultural events. Commissioned artworks and collaborated artist art projects. Under the patronage of the museum, it had several art exhibitions including a Photographic exhibition on the "Liberation War : Towards 25th Anniversary" held at 'La Galerie' in Dhaka [March, 1995], published a Photographic album containing 100 historic photographs portraying the Liberation struggle of Bangali people from the beginning (British Period) ending with the establishment of Bangladesh. The format of this album was such that it could be mounted anywhere for an exhibition [December, 1994], commissioned and collaborated (along with EMK center Dhaka) the war related art project of artist Firoz Mahmud's Sucker wfp21 project [March, 2016] among many others.

== International links ==
In 2006, the museum was fitted with modern audiovisual and exhibition equipment as a donation from the Japanese government to help preserve the culture and heritage of Bangladesh's independence movement. The museum is an institutional member of the American Alliance of Museums. It is also a founder member of the International Coalition of Historic Site Museums of Conscience.

== Board of trustees ==
The eight person board of trustees of the museum include: Aly Zaker, Asaduzzaman Noor, Sara Zaker, Sarwar Ali, Mofidul Hoque, Ziauddin Tariq Ali, Rabiul Hussain and H. Akku Chowdhury.

== See also ==
- Muktijuddho e-Archive, a Digital Library, working to 'preserve and publicly distribute' the historical documents regarding the Liberation War of Bangladesh and Genocide of Innocent Bengali People in 1971.
- Annihilate these demons, a 1971 poster illustrated by Quamrul Hassan, available at the museum.
