= Mofidul Hoque =

Bangladeshi researcher, publisher and essayist

- মফিদুল হক
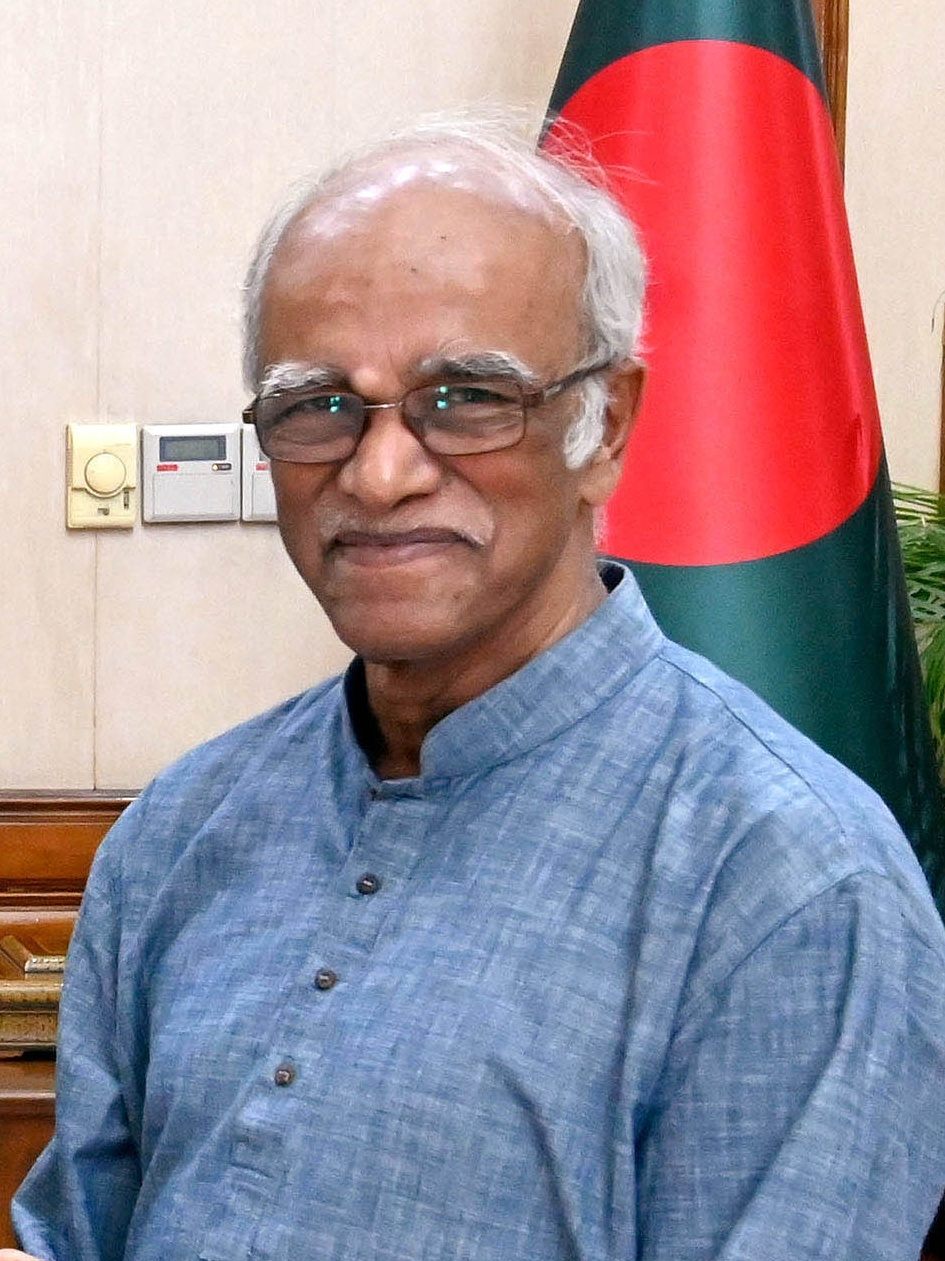
- Hoque in 2023
- Born: 13 February 1948 (age 78); Noakhali, East Bengal, Dominion of Pakistan
- Education: University of Dhaka
- Occupations: researcher, essayist
- Awards: Ekushey Padak (2016)

Mofidul Hoque (born 13 February 1948) is a Bangladeshi researcher, publisher and essayist. He is one of the founder trustees of the Bangladesh Liberation War Museum. He was awarded Ekushey Padak in 2016 and Bangla Academy Literary Award in 2013 by the government of Bangladesh.

== Early life ==
Hoque was born on 13 February 1948 in Noakhali of the then East Bengal (now Bangladesh). He obtained his masters in sociology from the University of Dhaka.

== Awards ==
- Bangla Academy Literary Award (2013)
- Ekushey Padak (2016)
- Altaf Mahmud Padak (2017)

== Personal life ==
Hoque is married to Sheema Moslem. Haque has a brother Monzurul Huq and a sister, Dilruba Islam (d. 2022).
