= Annihilate These Demons =

1971 poster by Quamrul Hassan

- এই জানোয়ারদের হত্যা করতে হবে (Bengali)
- A version of the poster
- Artist: Quamrul Hassan
- Year: 1971
- Type: Caricature
- Subject: Bangladesh Liberation War
- Location: Liberation War Museum, Dhaka

Annihilate These Demons (stylized in all caps) is a political poster illustrated by Quamrul Hassan. Created during the Bangladesh Liberation War in 1971, the poster features a caricature of Yahya Khan, the then-president of Pakistan. Depicting him as a monstrous beast, the image became one of the most influential artistic representations of the war and a symbol of the brutality of the Pakistan Army.

In 1970, Hassan spotted Khan in Dacca, the capital of East Pakistan (now Dhaka, Bangladesh). Khan's facial features served as the basis for sketches he drew during the non-cooperation movement in March 1971. The poster, which came to symbolize the oppressive Pakistani regime, was first published in May 1971 in The Jai Bangla newspaper during Bangladesh Liberation War. It was later distributed across liberated zones, refugee camps, and among the Mukti Bahini. Using only two colors, two versions of the poster were distributed in both Bengali and English.

== Creation ==
In 1970, artist Quamrul Hassan observed the then-president of Pakistan Yahya Khan at the Dacca Museum, East Pakistan (present-day Bangladesh National Museum, Dhaka, Bangladesh). According to Hassan, Khan looked "like a devil" at the time. Using this mental image as a reference, Hassan drew ten sketches of Khan during the non-cooperation movement in March 1971. He turned the sketches into posters with the title "জানোয়ারটা আবার আক্রমণ করতে পারে" (janowarta abar akromon korte pare, lit. 'this beast may attack again') and displayed them at the Shaheed Minar, Dacca on 23 March. Two days later, Operation Searchlight was launched in East Pakistan under Yahya Khan's order, leading to the start of the Bangladesh genocide. During the Bangladesh Liberation War, leaflets and posters were widely distributed to protest the genocide.

During the war, the newly formed provisional government established an Art and Design Division in Calcutta, India (the capital-in-exile), appointing Quamrul Hassan as its director. While in this role, he designed two versions of the poster featuring Yahya Khan as a monstrous figure. In one version, Khan is depicted as a bloodthirsty demon with glowing red eyes and blood dripping from his fangs. In the other, he has ears resembling those of an elephant. Since Yahya Khan was the mastermind behind Operation Searchlight, Hassan chose to portray him, instead of the Pakistani president, as a beast, making the image a symbol of Pakistan's oppressive regime. The poster used red and black as its primary colors and red highlights were placed around Yahya's eyes and fangs. After completing the artwork, Hassan discussed potential titles with his subordinates. When they suggested the Bengali word জানোয়ার (janōẇar), he finalized "এই জানোয়ারদের হত্যা করতে হবে" (ei janowarder hotta korte hobe, lit. 'these beasts must be killed') as the original title. At the time, janōẇar was a slang term which was rarely used in Bengali language, and was reserved for expressions of intense anger. A version of the poster was produced with the English text "Annihilate These Demons".

== Publication and exhibitions ==
The poster was first published in The Jai Bangla in May 1971. The newspaper featured the poster a total of three times under three different titles. Printed copies of the poster were distributed to liberated zones, refugee camps, and members of the Mukti Bahini. In 2008, the poster was exhibited at the Drik Gallery in Dhaka. In 2022, on the occasion of Quamrul Hassan's birth centenary, it was part of a special exhibition at the Nalinikanta Bhattasali Gallery of the Bangladesh National Museum. The poster is also on display at the Liberation War Museum in Dhaka and 1971: Genocide-Torture Archive and Museum in Khulna.

== Significance, reception, and legacy ==
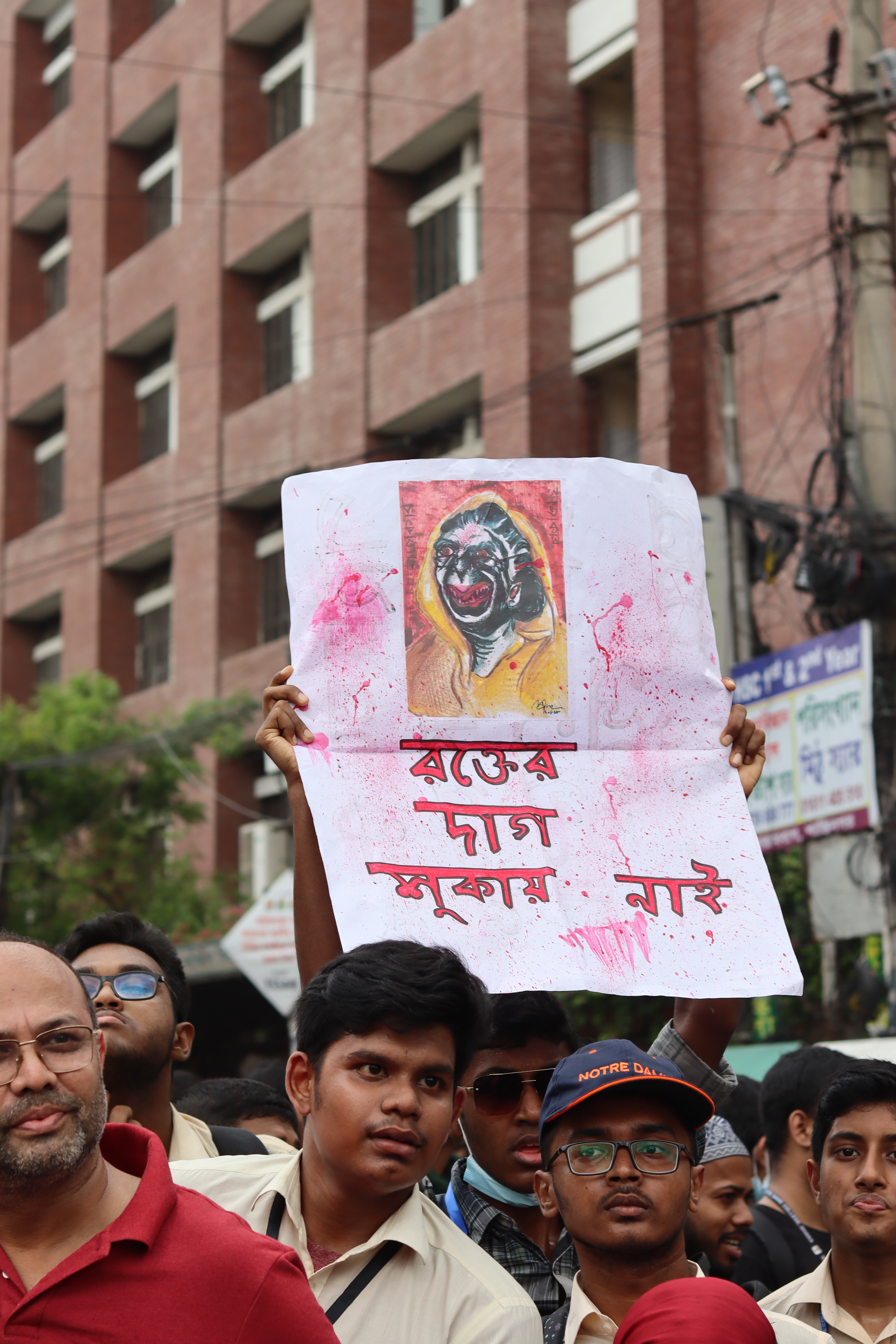
A demon-like portrayal of Sheikh Hasina inspiring from this poster during the July Revolution in 2024, which reads রক্তের দাগ শুকায় নাই ("The marks of blood have not yet dried")

The caricature depicted on the poster portrays Yahya Khan as a monstrous beast. Syed Azizul Haque called the poster politically significant, aesthetically remarkable in terms of artistic quality, and said that the poster had one of the greatest influences on the Bangladesh Liberation War. To Bangladeshi people that grew up around the early 2000s and later, the caricature of Yahya Khan from the poster is considered a symbol of the brutality of the Pakistan Army during the war. Art critic Moinuddin Khaled described the poster as a political document and compared the artwork to Pablo Picasso's 1937 piece The Dream and Lie of Franco. According to artist Qayyum Chowdhury, the monstrous figure of Khan depicted in the poster will remain eternally memorable to Bengalis, akin to the plundering cavalry of the Bargis, the Maratha raiders. Writer Mizanur Rahman remarked that during the war, the poster functioned as a weapon of resistance.

Artist and cartoonist Rafiqun Nabi described it as a provocative and courageous artwork, writing "শিল্পকর্ম হিসেবে এর যেমন বিশালত্ব রয়েছে, অন্য দিকে আছে তার আঁকার দক্ষতা, প্রতিবাদী প্রকাশ ক্ষমতা। কামরুল হাসানের জীবনের একটি দিক।" (lit. 'as an artwork, it possesses grandeur; at the same time, it demonstrates artistic skill and the power of protest. It represents an aspect of Quamrul Hassan's life.') Cartoonist Simu Naser stated that the satirical depiction of Yahya Khan in the poster has become an iconic image in the history of political cartoons in Bangladesh. In 2011, Sarmila Bose, an Indian-American academic of Bengali descent, described Khan's "hyena-like depiction" on Hassan's poster as "unconscionable." According to artist Monsur Ul Karim, the portrait of Khan depicted in the poster made the Pakistani army's characters transparent. Before the 2024 city corporation election, someone anonymously displayed the poster throughout the city of Mymensingh, adding the title "এই রক্তখেকো জানোয়ারদের হত্যা করতে হবে" (ei roktokheko janowarder hotta korte hobe, lit. 'these bloodthirsty beasts must be killed').
