= Rafiqun Nabi =

Bangladeshi artist and cartoonist (born 1943)

- রফিকুন নবী
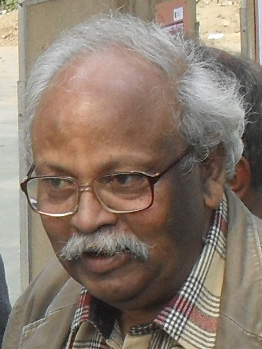
- Nabi in 2011
- Born: 28 November 1943 (age 82); Chapai Nawabganj, Bengal Presidency, British India
- Other name: Ranabi
- Education: East Pakistan College of Arts and Crafts
- Occupations: Artist, cartoonist
- Years active: 1964–present

Rafiqun Nabi (born 28 November 1943), better known as Ranabi, is a Bangladeshi artist and cartoonist. He is best known for creating Tokai, a character symbolizing the poor street boys of Dhaka who lives on picking things from dustbins or begging and having a knack of telling simple yet painful truths about current political and socio-economic situation of the country. He was awarded Ekushey Padak in 1993 by the government of Bangladesh.

== Early life and education ==
Nabi was born on 28 November 1943 to a Bengali Muslim family in Nawabganj District in India (now in northwest Bangladesh) in 1943. He started drawing in his childhood. In the early 1950s, his father took him to a painting exhibition, held at the then Burdwan House (now Bangla Academy). He completed his bachelor's and master's from the East Pakistan College of Arts and Crafts (now Faculty of Fine Arts, University of Dhaka). He studied under the supervision of artists like Zainul Abedin and Quamrul Hassan. He received a scholarship from the Asia Foundation between 1962 and 1964. During 1973–1976, he studied printmaking in Athens School of Fine Arts under the Greek Government's postgraduate scholarship.

Nabi served as a faculty member of Faculty of Fine Arts, University of Dhaka during 1964–2010.

== Career ==
Nabi started out as a professional cartoonist in 1963. His first contribution was to Weekly Purbodesh. Later in the mid-1960s, he became a regular in Shochitro Shandhani where he used to illustrate with cartoons the column Kaal Penchar Dairy by Abdul Gani Hazari. In the late 1960s, he worked for the Weekly Express, an English periodical. During 1969, he got involved in a periodical named Forum, published by Rehman Sobhan and Hamida Hossain.

Nabi returned from Greece in 1976. He began to contribute cartoons to the Weekly Bichitra and Dainik Bangla. He created the character Tokai, which first appeared in the anniversary issue of Bichitra in May 1977.

In 2025, Syed Azizul Huq published Rafiqun Nabi'r Chitrabali (Gallery Chitrak)
