= Tokai (character) =

Fictional character from series of comics by Rafiqun Nabi

- Tokai character
- "Cartoon that represents public opinion" (Art by Ranabi)
- First appearance: Saptahik Bichitra (17 May 1978)
- Last appearance: Weekly 2000
- Created by: Rafiqun Nabi

In-universe information
- Gender: Male
- Occupation: Dumpster diver Street kid
- Nationality: Bangladeshi
- Outfit: Lungi

Tokai (Bangla: টোকাই), transliterated as Tokaii, is the longest survived cartoon character of Bangladesh, is a creation of Rafiqun Nabi or Ronobi, as he is widely known. Tokai, a street urchin of age below ten, is not only a character, it is a phenomenon in Bangladesh, acting as a witty outlet of the feelings of the people about current political and socio-economic condition of the nation. In fact the word tokai has become the colloquial synonym for street kids or dumpster divers in Bangladesh. Having bald head and pot-belly, Tokai became a national asset of Bangladesh. People love Tokai because he reflects their own thoughts in a simple yet witty manner. Tokai, who represents the most deprived people in the society, is the most loved cartoon character in Bangladesh.

== History ==
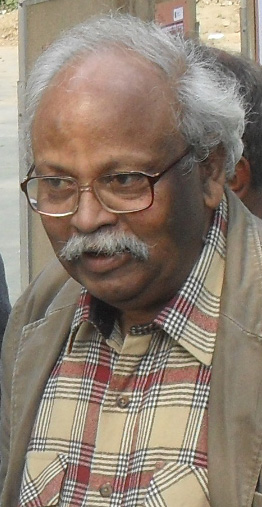
Rafiqun Nabi, the creator of the character

Tokai was started in the year-beginning issue of Saptahik Bichitra on 17 May 1978. Since then, Tokai appeared in the weekly magazine Saptahik Bichitra and later in Saptahik 2000 (Weekly 2000– another weekly magazine) continuously. Apart from a six-month break, Tokai has never been absent from making fun of current political and/or social issues.

In 1976, Ronobi returned from a three-year printmaking course in Greece. He thought about creating a character in this time. A street child used to live outside Ronobi's home who died later. Based on him and remembering how he asked Ronobi questions whenever he opens the door, Ronobi planned to portrait a street urchin. He thought this boy would be the perfect picture of thousands of penniless who live in Bangladesh.

So he transformed his thought into the cartoon. And from the very beginning, the innocent-looking, cunning little boy won the hearts of the readers. Readers flooded Ronobi with letters praising his Tokai and making suggestions for Tokai cartoons.

Upon receiving such enthusiasm among the readers, Ronobi began to use Tokai to express his own observations about Bangladeshi society in the hope that it might influence politicians and policy makers. Tokai has something to say about everything and he always criticises all political parties and all politicians.

Tokai appeared in Weekly Bichitra from 1978 to 1999. Tokai was an inseparable item of this magazine during this period. But after changing of the editorial board of Bichitra, Tokai has appeared in the magazine Weekly 2000 in 1999. Since then Tokai became a part of weekly 2000. After more than 25 years of the appearance of Tokai, the continuing poverty in Bangladesh makes him as relevant today as he was in 1978.

== In brief ==
The get up of Tokai is that of the common street children in Dhaka. Usually he is clad in a lungi that is barely reached to his knee. His upper body is bare and his swollen belly is prominent in the drawings. He has shaven head and thin limbs. His age is below ten, or more precisely, is about eight. He lives on the footpaths or in the big unused construction pipes strewn about the city of Dhaka. Just like the real Tokais, he lives on left-overs of others or food thrown away in dustbins. He has a very innocent face and expression.

Despite his apparent destitute status, he is always cheerful making fun and uttering witty scathing reflections on things around him, which constitute contemporary society. The precocious talkativeness is a major attribute of Tokai, as is his usual Dhakaiya language (Regional pronunciation of Dhaka). He is known by the name of his class rather than a proper name

== Insight ==
Tokai has a very nice sense of humour and a knack of telling simple yet painful truths. Tokai is always pointing at the hypocrisy and inhumanity, anomalies and loopholes of the society with a playful witty language. But Tokai never speaks of any revolution or change. Nor he demands anything of the existing social system. His uttering rather gives the sensitive mind food for thought. He just points at the peculiarity of the society.

== Examples of wits and satires ==
The fame of Tokai lies in his dialogues. Sometimes he speaks like a philosopher. once asked if he knows what a family is, the homeless Tokai reflects, 'I know what mine is—footpath, dustbin, the crows etc.'.

In another cartoon, when someone expresses surprise at his swollen belly, a smiling Tokai reasons that he has 'eaten' a lot of 'speeches' given on the occasion of the Children's Day.

Often Tokai makes fun of the society's hypocrisy. Asked what his vow is on the Children's Day, a grave Tokai says, 'To grow up soon'.

As is normal in cartoons, Tokai's world is also full of fantasies. Tokai often talks to cows, crows and other animals. To the fantasy of a crow wondering what would happen if it could exchange life with Tokai, the puzzled boy answers, 'What else! We would having our meal at this very same garbage bin like we are now!'

In one drawing, a man asks Tokai what he would do if he suddenly became rich. The unscrupulous urchin replies, 'Would ask like you the same question to the Tokai of that time.'

The cartoons of Tokai often have satires, sometimes directly, sometimes indirectly. When asked what he did at the Eid, the Tokai says, 'Did acting of being happy'.

== Impact ==
In Bangladesh, people love Tokai. Over the years because of Tokai they have even started to try to help the real street children like him. In many ways that is Tokai's biggest achievement. Through his creation Ronobi has made the people tolerant and sympathetic towards these little street urchins. Also, the word 'Tokai' itself has entered the Bengali vernacular as a generic name for street children.
