= Fazal Shahabuddin =

Bangladeshi poet and journalist (1936 – 2014)

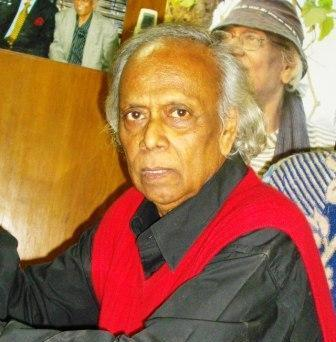
- Shahabuddin in 2010
- Born: 4 February 1936; Dhaka, Bengal Presidency, British India
- Died: 9 February 2014 (aged 78); Dhaka, Bangladesh
- Resting place: Banani graveyard

Fazal Shahabuddin (4 February 1936 – 9 February 2014) was a Bangladeshi poet and journalist. He was awarded Bangla Academy Literary Award in 1973 and Ekushey Padak in 1988.

== Early life and career ==
Shahabuddin was born in Dhaka in 1936. His family hailed from the village of Shahpur in Nabinagar, Brahmanbaria District. His poetry spanned four decades from the mid-60s until his death. He was the founding editor of Bichitra, a weekly magazine, and he also worked at Shachitra Shandhani and Dainik Bangla.

Shahabuddin died in February 2014.
