= Bichitra =

Government-owned magazine in Bangladesh

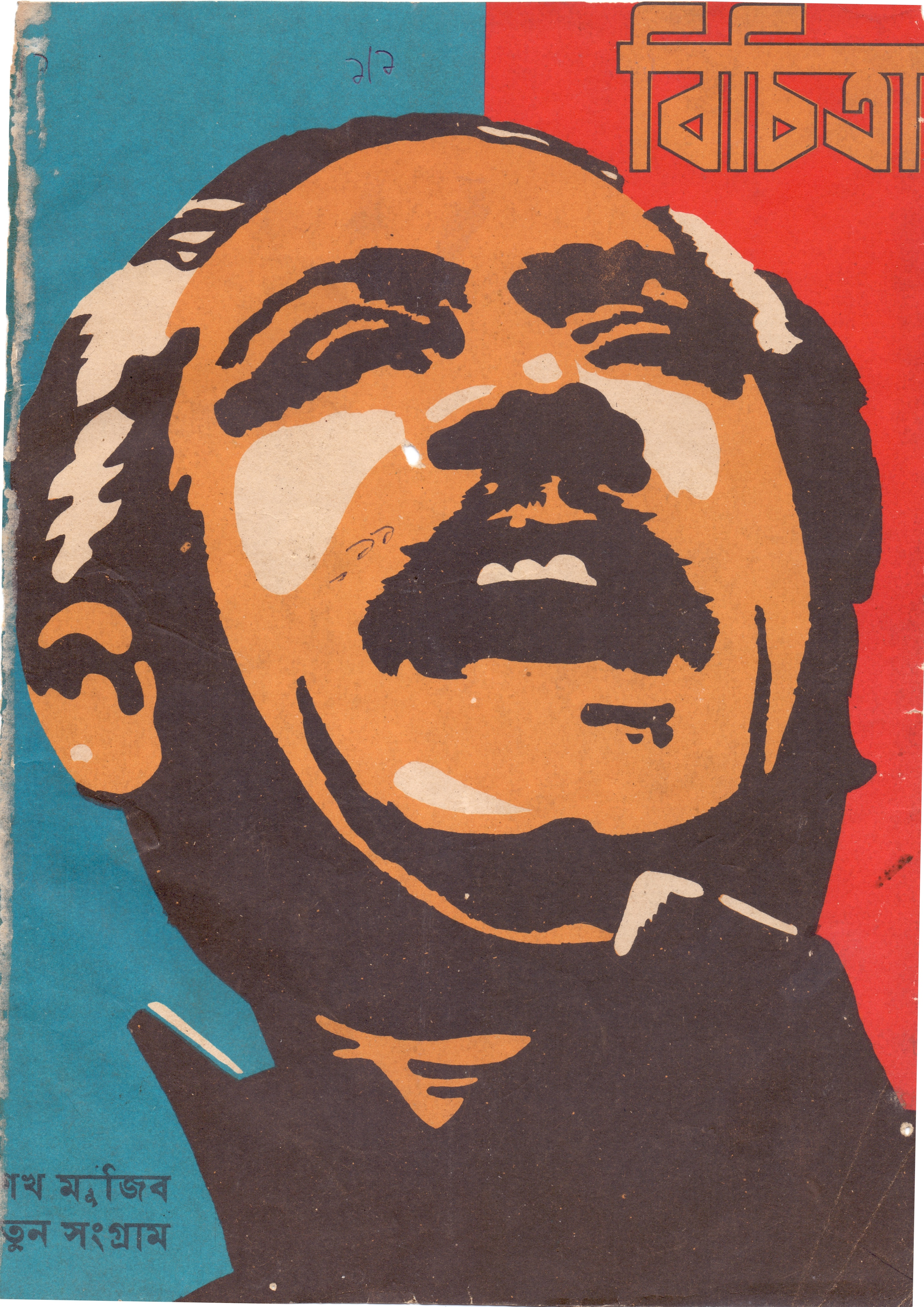
- Cover of first issue of Bichitra (1972)
- Editor: Shahadat Chowdhury
- Categories: Literary magazine
- Frequency: Weekly
- First issue: 1972
- Final issue: 1997
- Country: Bangladesh
- Based in: Dhaka, Bangladesh
- Language: Bengali

Bichitra is a defunct weekly literary magazine. It was owned by the Government of Bangladesh and edited by Shahadat Chowdhury. The magazine has been described as a historic milestone and a pioneering magazine.

== History ==
Fazal Shahabuddin is the founding editor of the magazine. It was founded in 1972. Bichitra was the first publication in Bangladesh to issue a special Eid edition. Ziaur Rahman talked about his role in the Bangladesh Liberation war and the leadership of Sheikh Mujibur Rahman in an article in the magazine in 1972. On 17 May 1978, the Tokai, by Rafiqun Nabi, was first published in the magazine. The cartoon would go on to achieve iconic status in Bangladesh.

On 7 December 1991, Sufia Kamal gave an interview to the magazine about her memories of Bangladesh Liberation war. The executive editor, Shahriar Kabir, was fired by the magazine for his involvement in Gono Adalat. Shahadat Chowdhury served as the editor of the magazine until 1997. The government stopped publication of the magazine in 1997.
