= Shahadat Chowdhury =

Bangladeshi journalist

- শাহাদত চৌধুরী
- Born: 28 July 1943; Khulna, Bengal Province, British India
- Died: 29 November 2005 (aged 62); Dhaka, Bangladesh
- Occupations: Journalist, editor
- Parents: Abdul Haq Chowdhury (father); Jahanara Chowdhury (mother)
- Relatives: Fateh Ali Chowdhury (brother); Shahriar Kabir (brother-in-law)
- Awards: Ekushey Padak

Shahadat Chowdhury (28 July 1943 – 29 November 2005) was a Bangladeshi journalist and editor of several news magazines. He served as the editor of Weekly Bichitra from 1972 until its publication was ceased in 1997. He then served as the editor of Shaptahik 2000 and Anandadhara.

In 1993, Chowdhury was awarded the Ekushey Padak, the state's second highest civilian honor, for his outstanding contribution to journalism.

== Early life ==
Shahadat Chowdhury was born on 28 July 1943 in Khulna to Abdul Haq Chowdhury, a district judge, and Jahanara Chowdhury. He was one of the 12 children including Fateh Ali Chowdhury (d. 2024), one of the members of the Crack Platoon, and Fatema Kabir (d. 2000), the wife of Shahriar Kabir.

Chowdhury completed his matriculation from Dhaka Graduate High School and bachelor's in painting from the Institute of Fine Arts.

== Career ==
Chowdhury was the editor of Kachi-Kanchar Asar, the children page of The Daily Ittefaq in 1961. He was the travelogue writer of Kachi Kanchar Mela, a children's cultural organisation in the then East Pakistan.

Chowdhury joined as the founding editor of the journal of Media World group Shaptahik 2000.

Chowdhury took part in Sector 2 and was a member of Crack Platoon of the 1971 liberation war. He built up a guerilla force and initiated adventurous actions in Dhaka. He assisted two daunting daughters of Poet Sufia Kamal crossing the border to India. During the war, he began his career in journalism by editing Lorai which published the news of Mukti Bahini. He was also one of the architects of Ghatak Dalal Nirmul Committee.

After the independence of Bangladesh, he joined the Weekly Bichitra in 1972 as an assistant editor and went on to become the editor of the magazine until 1997. In 1998, he joined as the editor of Shaptahik 2000 and fortnightly Anandadhara.

Chowdhury organized the first beauty pageant television program in Bangladesh in 1998. The program was titled Ananda Bichitra Photo Shundori. Actress Sadika Parvin Popy was the winner in that year.

== Personal life and death ==
In 1977, one of the eyes of the first ever posthumous eye-donor of Bangladesh, ARM Inamul Haq, was transplanted to Chowdhury.

Chowdhury died on 28 November 2005. He was buried in state honour in Mirpur Martyred Intellectual Graveyard in Dhaka. He was awarded the Ekushey Padak posthumously in 2006.
