= Moinul Ahsan Saber =

Bangladeshi writer

- মঈনুল আহসান সাবের
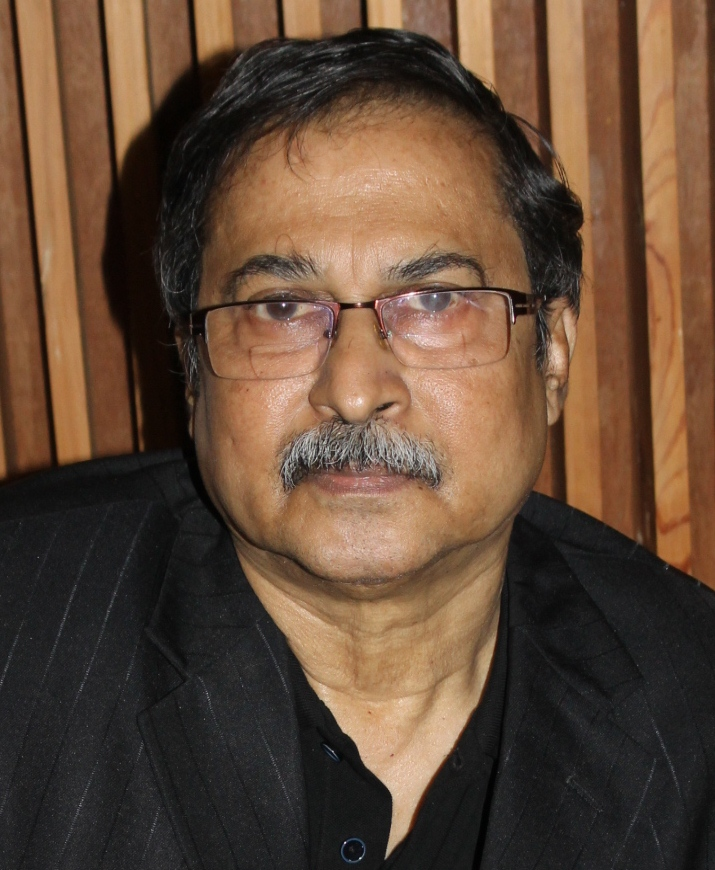
- Saber
- Born: 26 May 1958 (age 68)
- Occupations: Editor, writer
- Relatives: Ahsan Habib (father)

Moinul Ahsan Saber (born 26 May 1958) is a Bangladeshi fiction writer. He is the executive editor of weekly magazine Saptahik 2000, published from Dhaka. He also heads Dibya Prokash, a progressive publishing house in Bangladesh. He was awarded Bangla Academy Literary Award in 1996. For his contribution to Bengali language and literature, the Bangladesh government awarded him the Ekushey Padak, the country's second highest civilian honor in 2019.

== Early life and career ==
Saber's father, Ahsan Habib, was a poet. His sister Keya Chowdhury is a well-known Bangla reciter. Saber emerged as a writer and got breakthrough with the publication of his first novel Porasto Sahish in 1982.

== Works ==
=== Books ===
- Porasto Sahish (The Defeated Horse-Keeper), 1982
- Aadmer Jonye Opeksha (Waiting for Adam), 1986
- Pathor Somoy (Frozen Time), 1989
- Char Torun Toruni (Four Teenage Boys and Girls), 1990
- Manush Jekhane Jai Na (Where Man Doesn't Go), 1990
- Dharabahik Kahini (A Continuous Story), 1992
- Opeksha (Waiting), 1992
- Tumi Amake Niye Jabe (You Will Take Me), 1993
- Kobej Lethel (Kobej, the Ruffian), 1993
- Prem O Protishodh (Love and Revenge), 1993
- Songshar Japon (Family Life), 1997

=== Television drama ===
- Pathor Somoy, Bangladesh Television

=== Film ===
- Liliputera Ber Hobe (screenplay based on Gulliver's Travels)
