= Shaptahik 2000 =

Bengla Language Magazine From Bangladesh

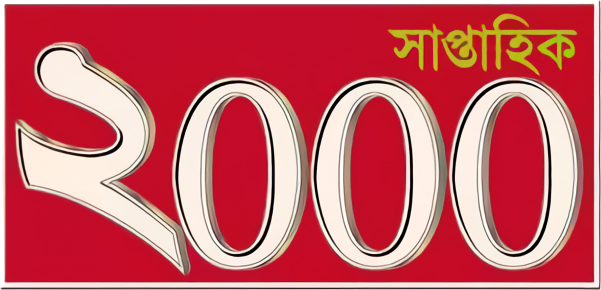
Shaptahik 2000's logo

Shaptahik 2000 was a Bengali-language magazine that was published weekly from 1998 to 2014. The magazine was published by Mediaworld Ltd, a concern of Transcom Group of Bangladesh.

== History ==
Shaptahik 2000 was established in 1998. Its founding editor was Shahadat Chowdhury. The publisher of the magazine was Mahfuz Anam, the editor of The Daily Star. On 12 March 2005, Shumi Khan, the Chittagong correspondent of the magazine, received threats from Jamaat-e-Islami Bangladesh. This threat was issued after Shumi wrote an article that accused Shahjahan Chowdhury, a Member of Parliament from Jamaat-e-Islami Bangladesh, of supporting terrorism.

In 2007 the magazine published an autobiographical article by Daud Haider, a Bangladesh writer exiled in 1973 for criticising Islam. The magazine, its editor, Golam Mortuza, and publisher, Mahfuz Anam, were sued by Mohammad Reza, an administrative officer of Al Jamia Al Islamia Islamic University over the publication of the writing by Daud Haider. The government of Bangladesh confiscated all copies of the issue with Daud Haider's writing the editor of the magazine issued a public apology. The Home Ministry secretary Abdul Karim criticised the publication of the article by the magazine.

Moinul Ahsan Saber, the editor of the magazine, announced that the magazine would be discontinued after 31 October 2014. The decision to close the magazine was taken by the publisher, Mahfuz Anam, due to falling revenue.
