= Quamrul Hassan =

Bengali artist (1921-1988)

Potua Quamrul Hassan
- কামরুল হাসান
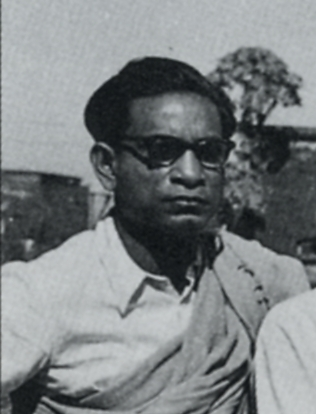
- Detail of Hassan from a group photo in Dhaka, 1955
- Born: 2 December 1921; Calcutta, Bengal Presidency, British Raj
- Died: 2 February 1988 (aged 66); Dhaka, Dhaka District, Bangladesh
- Education: Calcutta Madrasa; University of Calcutta (1947)
- Occupation: Artist
- Notable work: ANNIHILATE THESE DEMONS (1971); Desh Aaj Bishwabehayar Khappare (1988)
- Movement: Bratachari
- Awards: Independence Day Award (1979)

Quamrul Hassan (Bengali: কামরুল হাসান; 2 December 1921– 2 February 1988) was a Bangladeshi artist. Quamrul Hassan is referred to in Bangladesh as Potua, a word usually associated with folk artists, due to his down to earth style yet very modern in nature as he always added Cubism other than the folk style to his artworks. In addition to his artistic legacy, two of Quamrul Hassan's work have come to be part of Bangladesh's political history. The first of these is a monstrous rendition of Yahya Khan, the Pakistani president who ordered genocide in Bangladesh. The second was just before his death, mocking the then dictator of Bangladesh, Hossain Mohammad Ershad. This sketch was titled Desh aaj bisshobeheyar khoppre (Our land is now in the hand of the champion of shamelessness).

== Early life ==
Hassan was born in Kolkata on 2 December 1921. His father, Muhammad Hashim, was superintendent of a local graveyard. He belonged to a conservative family and his father always opposed to his involvement in paintings. But Hassan's determination and love for painting made his father enroll Hassan to Government Institute of Arts (now Government College of Art & Craft), in 1938, under the condition that Quamrul had to pay for his own tuition fee. After his enrollment to the school, Hassan kept himself busy with not only arts but with other activities such as sports and the Bratachari movement in 1939 and he also joined ARP during the Second World War. He developed connections with the Forward Block, Gononatya Andolon (People's Theatre) and even with several leaders of the Communist Party, got involved with the task of teaching of children and teenagers and contributed to illustrations in publications.

As a result of his involvement in social and cultural activities, Hassan finished his six-year course in the Art School in nine years. He graduated in 1947. He secured first position in the B Group of the Inter College Bodybuilding competition in 1945. He had become a 'Nayak' of the Bratachari movement. After the partition of India, Hassan, who was still a student, along with his mother and siblings moved to Dhaka, the then capital of East Pakistan.

He was involved in the non-cooperation movement of March 1971 and was nominated the chairman of the Resistance Committee of the Hatirpul area. On 23 March, he put up at least ten propaganda posters portraying a monstrous face of Yahya Khan named Anhilate These Demons which inspired the freedom Fighters. On 25 March 1971, trenches were dug out late night at Hatirpul area under his leadership. Then he left for Kolkata in the first week of April where he arranged an art exhibition in favor of the liberation war. He came back to Dhaka during the last half of December to help develop the newly liberated Bangladesh. He also designed the state monograms for Bangladesh, Freedom Fighters Welfare Trust, Bangladesh Parjatan Corporation, Bangladesh Bank, and Biman Bangladesh Airlines.

== Career ==
After the Partition of India, together with Zainul Abedin, he established the Government Institute of Fine Arts (at present, the Faculty of Fine Arts) in 1948. During the liberation war he served as the Director of the Art Division of the Information and Radio Department of the Bangladesh Government in exile.

== Art ==
Uki, gouache.

Getting inspired from Zainul Abedin, Jamini Roy, Hassan chose to give the folk art tradition a breath of life by incorporating modern ideas in it. He always borrowed the two-dimensionality of pata paintings of folk art in his work, he also attempted to give the quality of three-dimensionality in it. Instead of using mixed colours, in most of his paintings he used primary colors like pata painters. Sometimes, like folk artists, he applied flat colors without creating tonal variations. However, he has attempted to create color perspective by using various colors in one plane, so that a sense of height, distance can be created in the image. This technique was inspired from Henri Matisse. Patriotism was born in him due to his involvement in folk art. Some of his notable works are: Goon Tana, The Happy Return, Biral, Nabanna, Gorur Snan etc. All of these paintings highlight the lives of lower-class people which has been the topmost priority of his paintings. He also wrote 2 books which are "Amader Lokkristi" and "Bangladesh-er Shilpo Andolon O Amar Kotha".

Hassan was a versatile artist working in practically all media-oil, gouache, watercolors, pastel, etching, woodcut, linocut, pen and pencil. He also worked with woodcuts, specially after the famine of 1974, works that expressed his rage and anger. Quamrul Hassan used snakes, jackals and owls to portray the evil in humans, both in his political work and his famine work.

Rural women and their plight is another theme Hassan has repeatedly worked on. His treatment of women emphasize the bond between them, most of his paintings of women are of a group of women, only rarely a solo painting can be found. However, he mixes romanticism with realism; the strong curved lines and the contrasted use of color contribute to a sensuous appeal that blunts the edges of harsh reality. His paintings of women can be divided into three phases: the 50s Love and Premarital stage, the end of 50s and the beginning of 70s the happy conjugal life, and the 70s and the 80s the time of marital separation. First stage marks the memories of his late mother. The paintings of the stage were made simply from the painters memories of his lost mother but in an abstracted form. Like the painting three women gossiping over a topic. It was actually his mother gossiping to two other women. Second stage marks the time when he was in love with his wife and they together had a daughter. The notable works of the period can be Afterbath, Jalkeli (waterplay), Loneliness etc. And the third stage marks the time when he and his wife were separated due to some reasons and at this period instead of highlighting some emotions that are visible in his other paintings, he kept on drawing female nudes.

His political paintings reflected his political understanding and patriotism. Some of his notable works under the category are: Freedom Fighters, Female Freedom Fighters, Gonohatyar Agey O Gonohatyar Porey ( Before and after the mass killing) etc. His series titled Image'74 shows his political view which portrays the tendency of sacrificing morals and ethics over some personal gains among politicians, bureaucrats and the businessmen of Bangladesh.

== Death ==
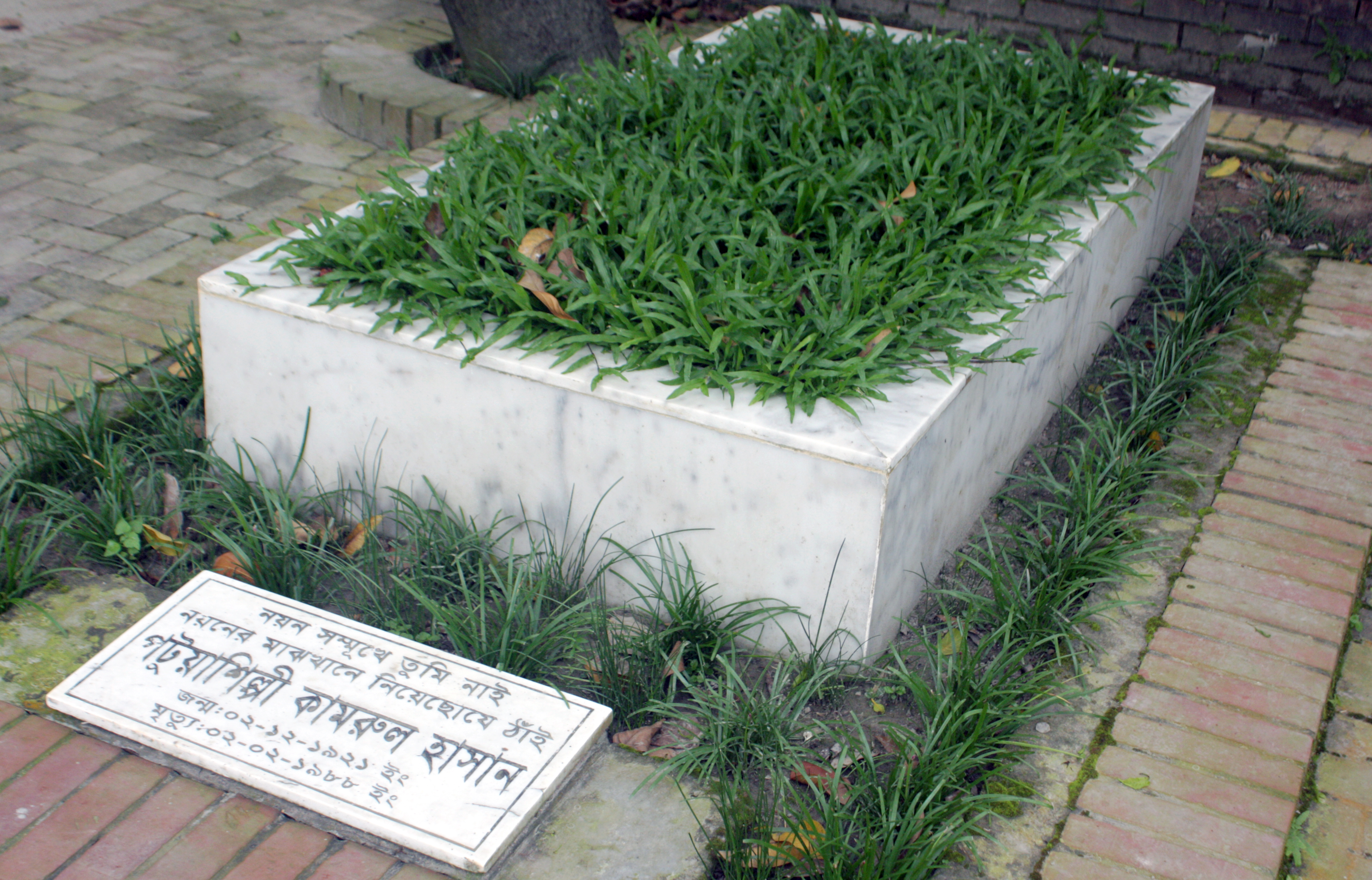
Tomb of Quamrul Hassan

Hassan died on 2 February 1988 after suffering a massive heart attack while attending the National Poetry Festival. He was buried beside the central mosque of the University of Dhaka.

== Awards and honors ==
- President's Gold Medal (1965)
- Independence Day Award (1979)
- Bangladesh Charu Shilpi Sangsad Honour (1984)
- Fellow of Bangla Academy (1985)
