= Women Teachers Training College =

Government Teachers Training College (Female), Mymensingh
- সরকারি টিচার্স ট্রেনিং কলেজ (মহিলা), ময়মনসিংহ
- Type: Public, women only
- Established: 1952; 74 years ago
- Affiliation: National University
- Location: Mymensingh Sadar, Mymensingh, Bangladesh; 24.7586°N 90.3967°E
- Campus: Urban
- Colours: Blue and Gold
- Website: ttcw.mymensingh.gov.bd

Government Teachers Training College (Female), Mymensingh also known as Women Teachers Training College is an educational institution in Mymensingh, Bangladesh. It is the only school of its kind in Bangladesh. As of 1978, it offered bachelor's and master's degrees in Education.

== Campus ==
Since 1952, the college has been housed in Shashi Lodge, a landmark building that sits on a 9-acre (3.6 ha) property. The current Shashi Lodge is the second building by this name. The original was built by Maharaja Shurjokanto Acharya Chowdhury and named for his son, Shashikanto Acharya Chowdhury. After the original lodge was destroyed by fire due to the 1897 Assam earthquake, Shashikanto had it rebuilt at a cost of Taka 3 lakh, using materials and instruments imported from Paris. An unusual feature of the 24-room building is a musical staircase. On the grounds in front of the lodge there is a fountain that has as its centerpiece a stone statue of Venus bathing. Shashi Lodge has been used as a filming location for movies and television plays.

=== Recent deterioration ===
The Lodge building is now deteriorated and is no longer used for classrooms. Modern brick buildings have also been erected on the Shashi Lodge property for the school's use. The national Ministry for Cultural Affairs and Education Ministry agreed in 1995 that Shashi Lodge would be transferred to the Ministry for Cultural Affairs for better preservation and for use by the Mymensingh Museum after new college buildings were built, but this did not occur.
