= Shashi Lodge =

Early 19th century palace in Mymensingh

- শশী লজ (Bengali)
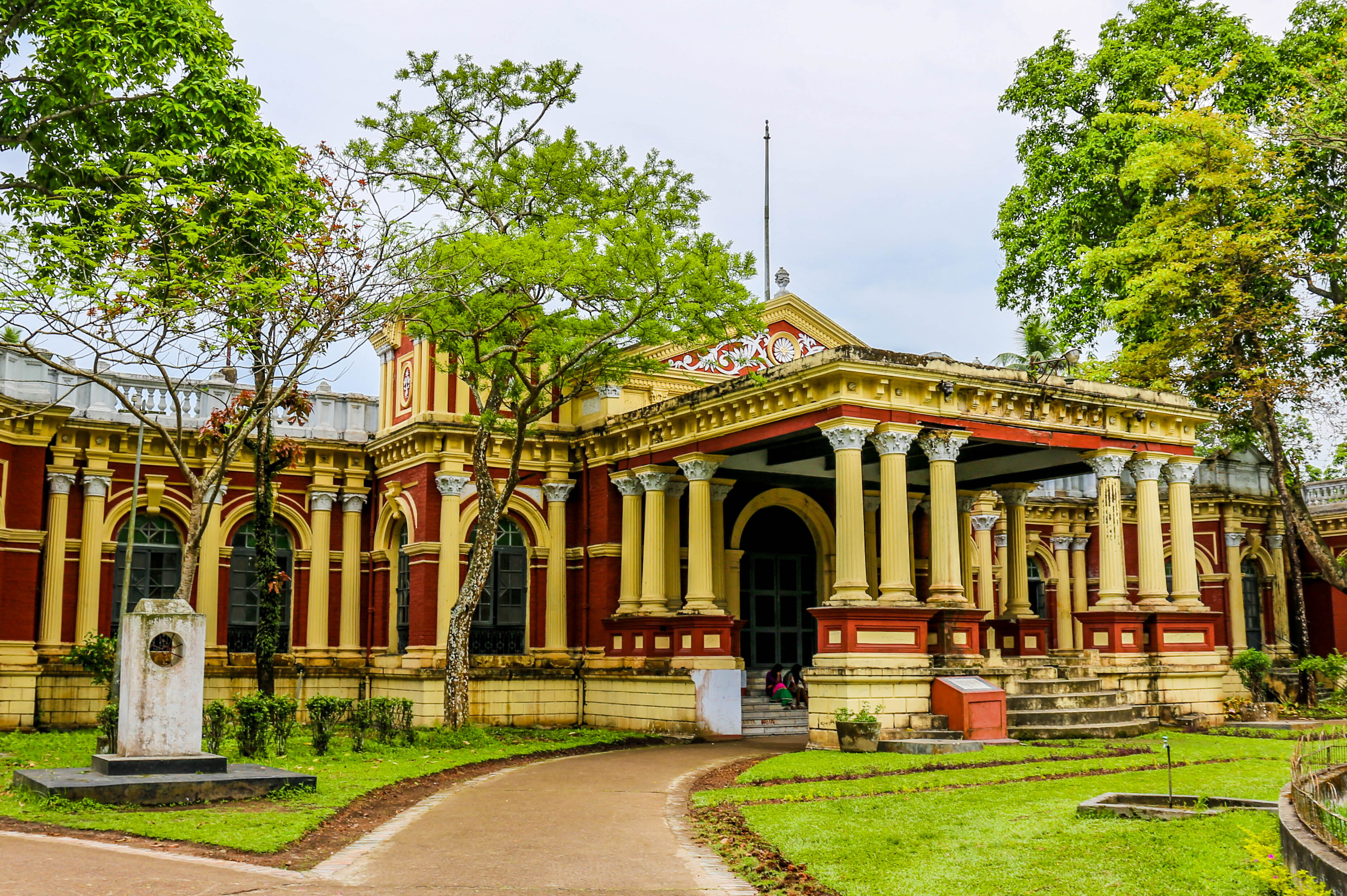
- Palace-residence of Maharaja Shashikant Acharya
- Interactive map of Shashi Lodge
- 24.761787°N 90.402991°E
- Location: Mymensingh Sadar, Mymensingh, Bangladesh

History
- Built: 1905

The Shashi Lodge (Bengali: শশী লজ), also known as the Rajbari of Mymensingh, was the palace-residence of Maharaja Shashikant Acharya, who was the Maharaja of the Muktagacha Zamindari Estate in Mymensingh of East Bengal during the time of the British Raj in India. The palace is located by the river Brahmaputra, in the heart of Mymensingh, Bangladesh. Through the end of the British Raj and the partition of India in 1947, East Bengal became the eastern wing of the independent state of Pakistan. After the passing of the East Bengal State Acquisition and Tenancy Act of 1950 by the democratic Government of East Bengal in the Dominion of Pakistan, the zamindari system was abolished. Since 1952, Shashi Lodge was used as a training center for women teachers and it continued even after East Bengal seceded from Pakistan to become Bangladesh. The Lodge building has deteriorated and is no longer used as a training center. On 4 April 2015, Shashi Lodge was acquired by the Directorate of Archeology of the Government of Bangladesh to set up a museum.

== History ==
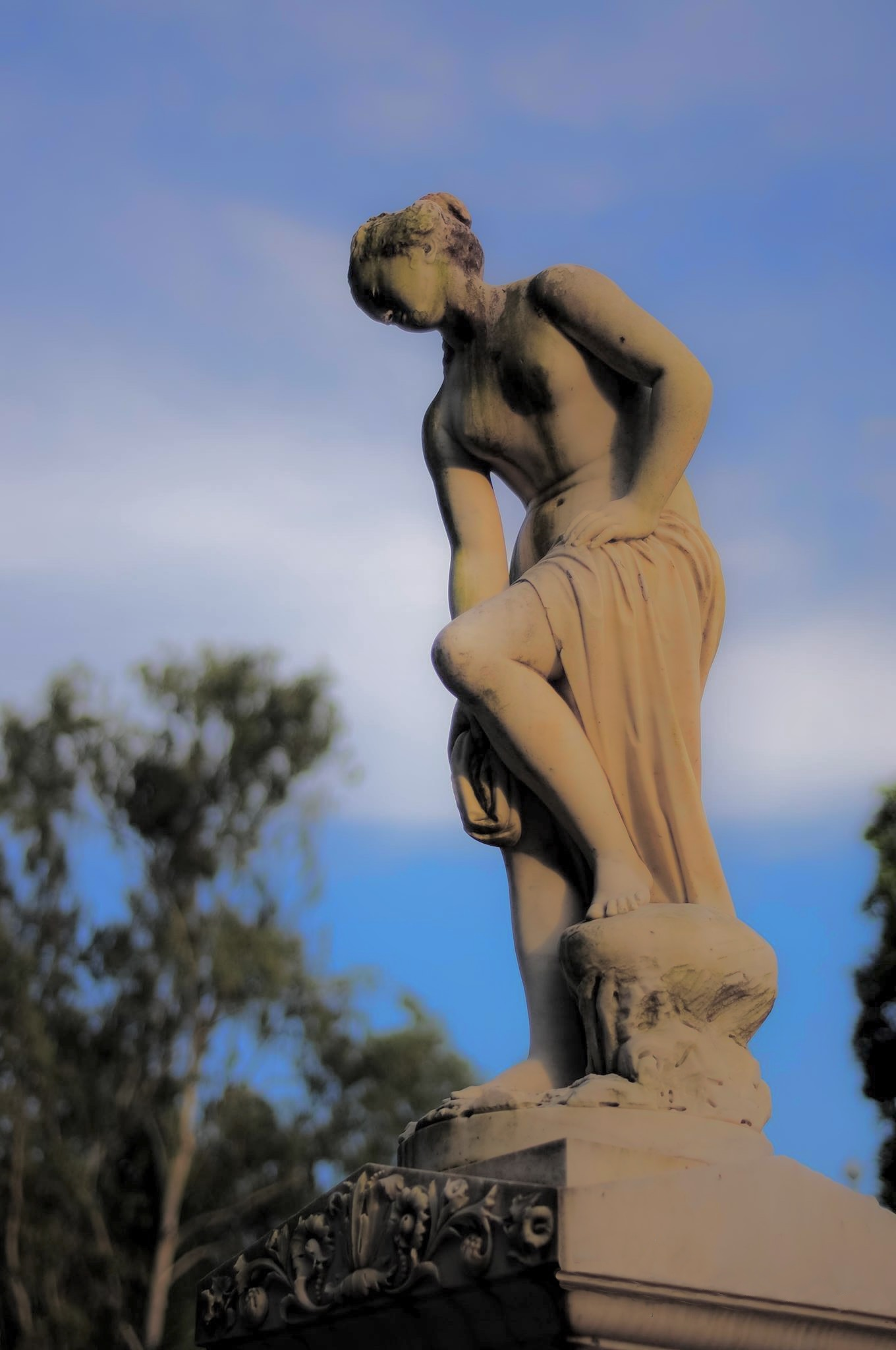
A marble statue of the Roman goddess Venus was within the premises of Shashi Lodge

The founder of the Muktagacha Zamindari Estate was Shri Krishna Acharya Chowdhury, who held the title of 'Maharaja of Muktagacha'. The fourth Maharaja of Muktagacha and great-grandson of Shri Krishna Acharya was Raghunandan Acharya Chowdhury. Maharaja Raghunandan had no biological children and in order to make sure his zamindari estate does not get confiscated by the British Raj government, the Maharaja decided to adopt a boy who they named Gaurikant Acharya Chowdhury. Gaurikant succeeded Raghunandan as the fifth Maharaja. It turned out that Maharaja Gaurikant failed to produce biological children. After the Maharaja's death, his widow Maharani Bimala Devi adopted a boy and named him Kashikanta Acharya Chowdhury, who became the sixth Maharaja. After passing away childless, Maharaja Kashikant's widow Maharani Lakshmi Devi adopted a boy and named him Chandrakant. The seventh Mahraja, Chandrakant Acharya had a short reign and passed away early. His foster mother, Maharani Lakshmi Devi adopted again. This time a boy called Purnachandra Majumdar was adopted. Purnachandra Majumdar ascended the throne as the eighth Maharaja under his new name Suryakant Acharya Chowdhury.

During the reign of Maharaja Suryakant Acharya Chowdhury, the Brahmaputra bank became fertile and generated immense agricultural revenue. He did many philanthropic works in the broad context of zamindari management for about 41 years. He established aesthetic structures in Mymensingh. At the end of the 19th century, Suryakant built a two-storied mansion on 3.6 hectares in the heart of Mymensingh city. The building was named Shashi Lodge after the adopted son of Shashikant Acharya Chowdhury. He was saddened when this building was damaged by the Great Indian Earthquake on 12 June 1897. In 1905, the ninth Maharaja, Shashikant Acharya Chowdhury built Shashi Lodge with a new design at the same place. In 1911, the renovation was completed to beautify the Shashi Lodge and soon the mansion became a fabulous and luxurious palace due to the efforts of the new Zamindar.

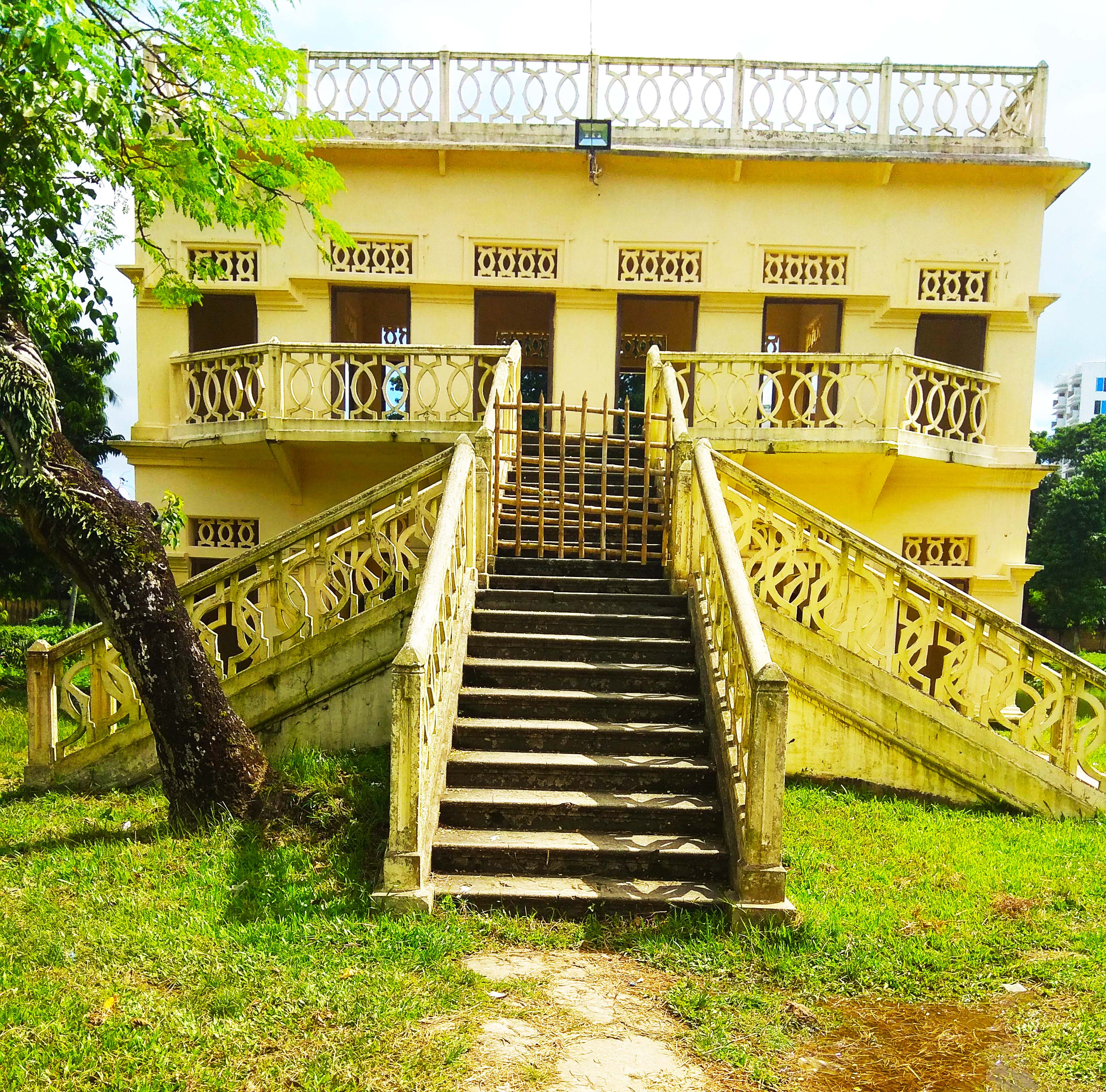
Behinds of Main Shashi Lodge there is a Pond and this is used for their bath.

The Venus statue, built more than 200 years ago, at Shashi Lodge was destroyed after the fall of Sheikh Hasina on 5 August 2024. The head of the statue was taken away.

== Gallery ==
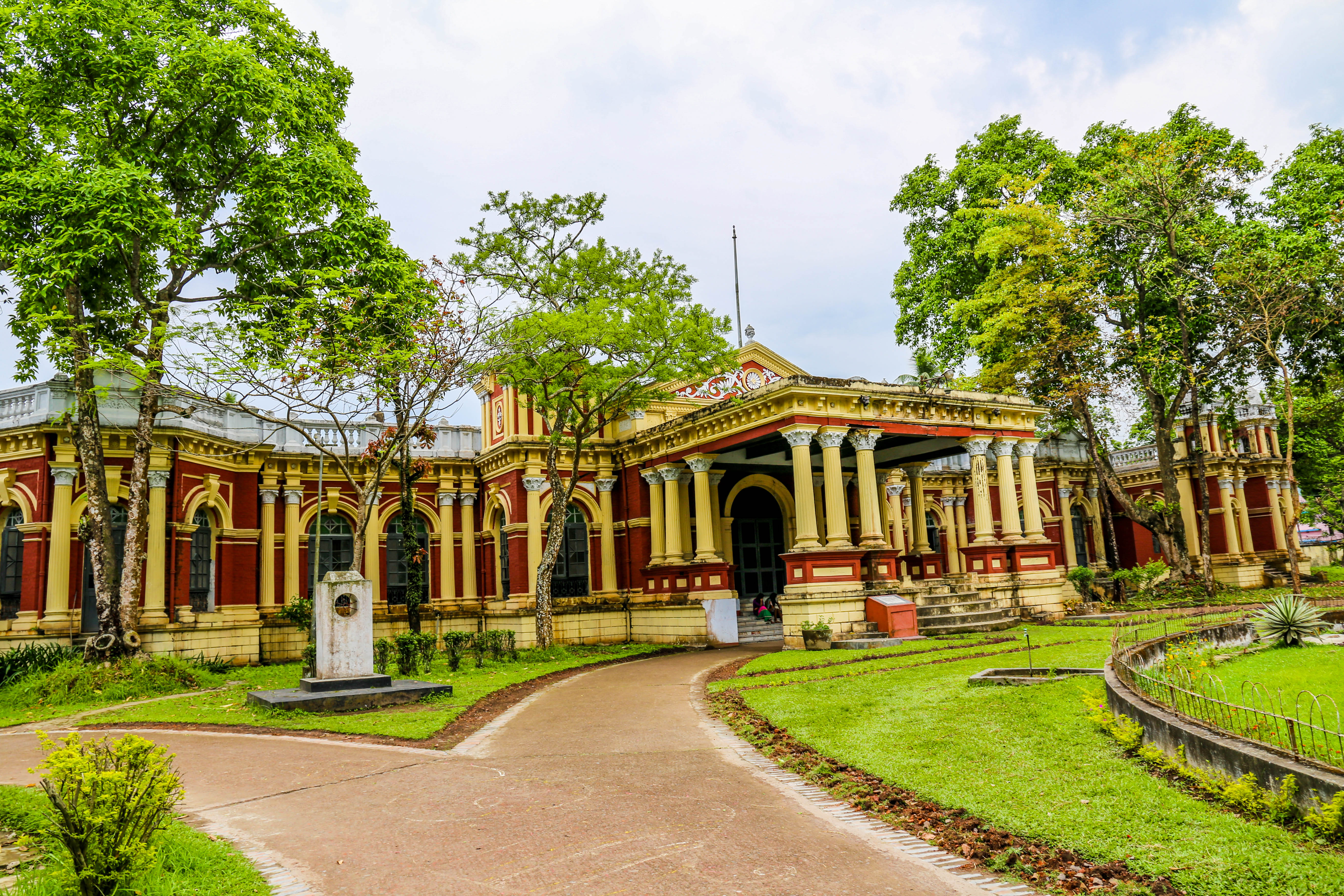

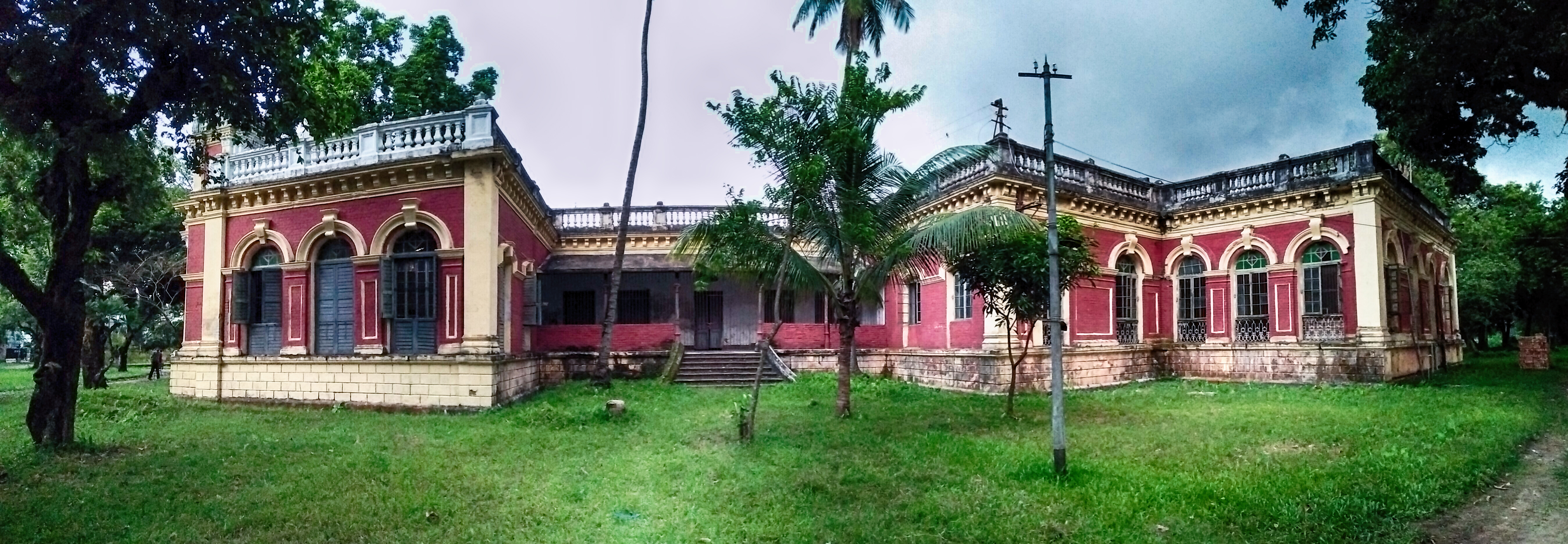

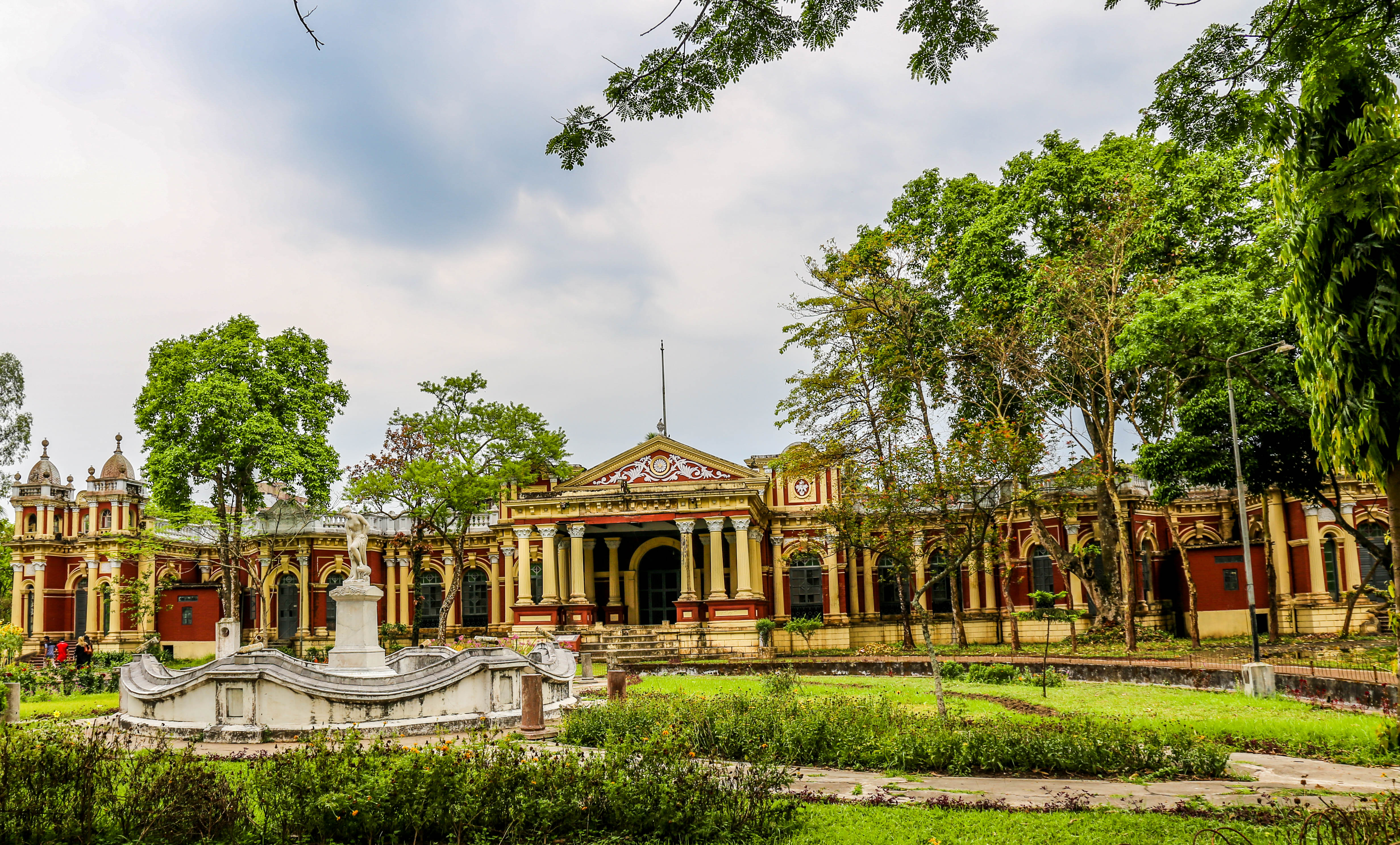

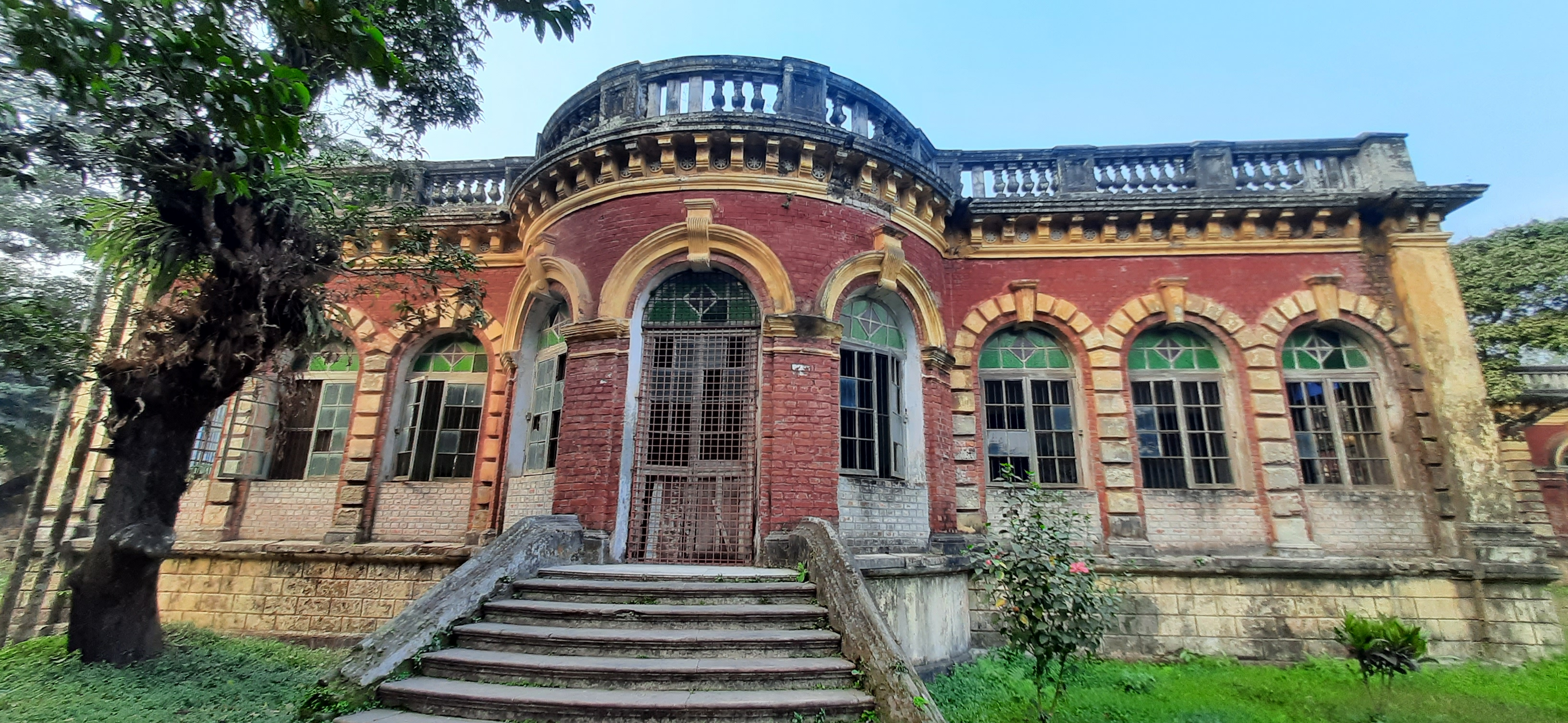

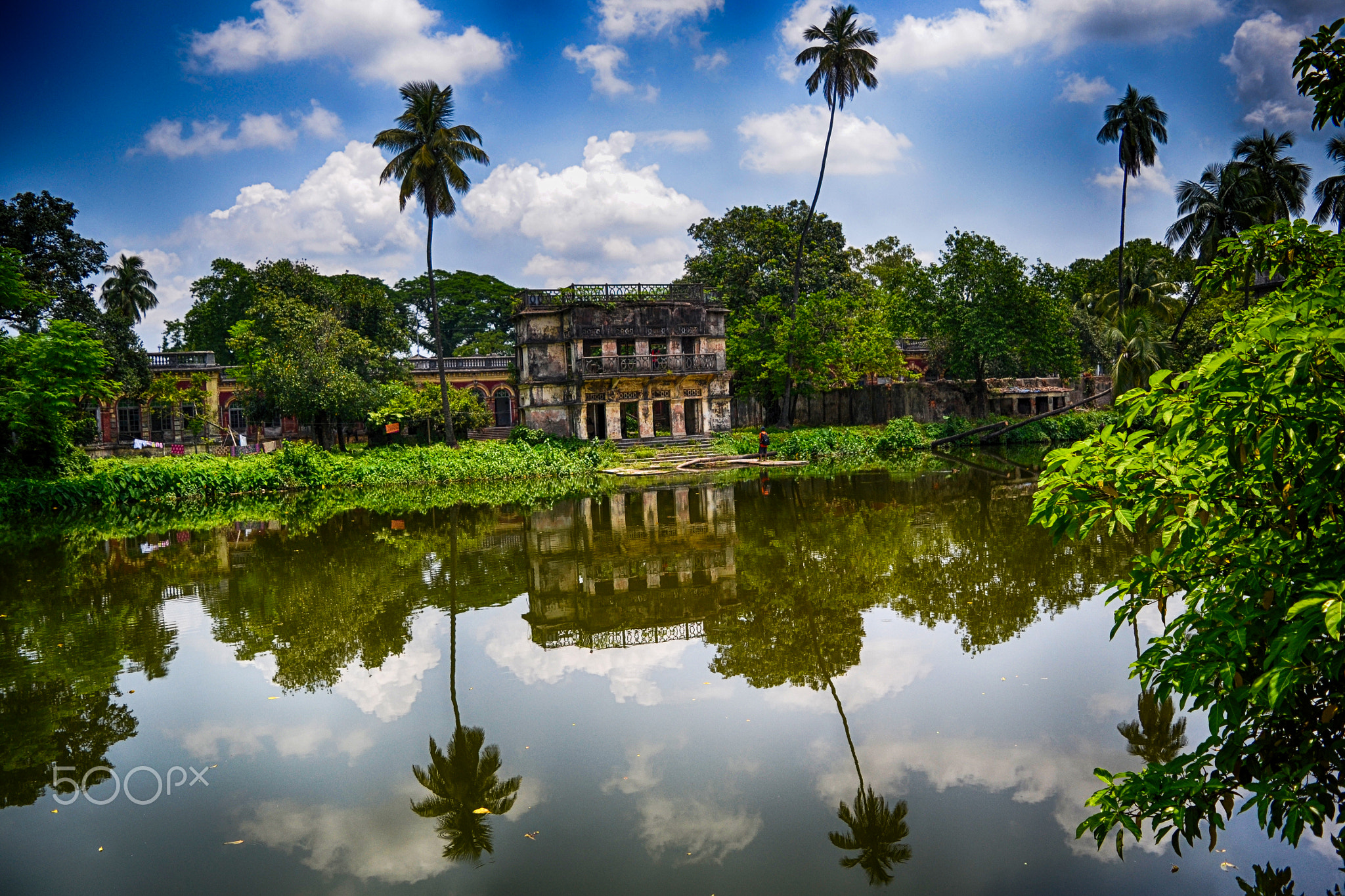

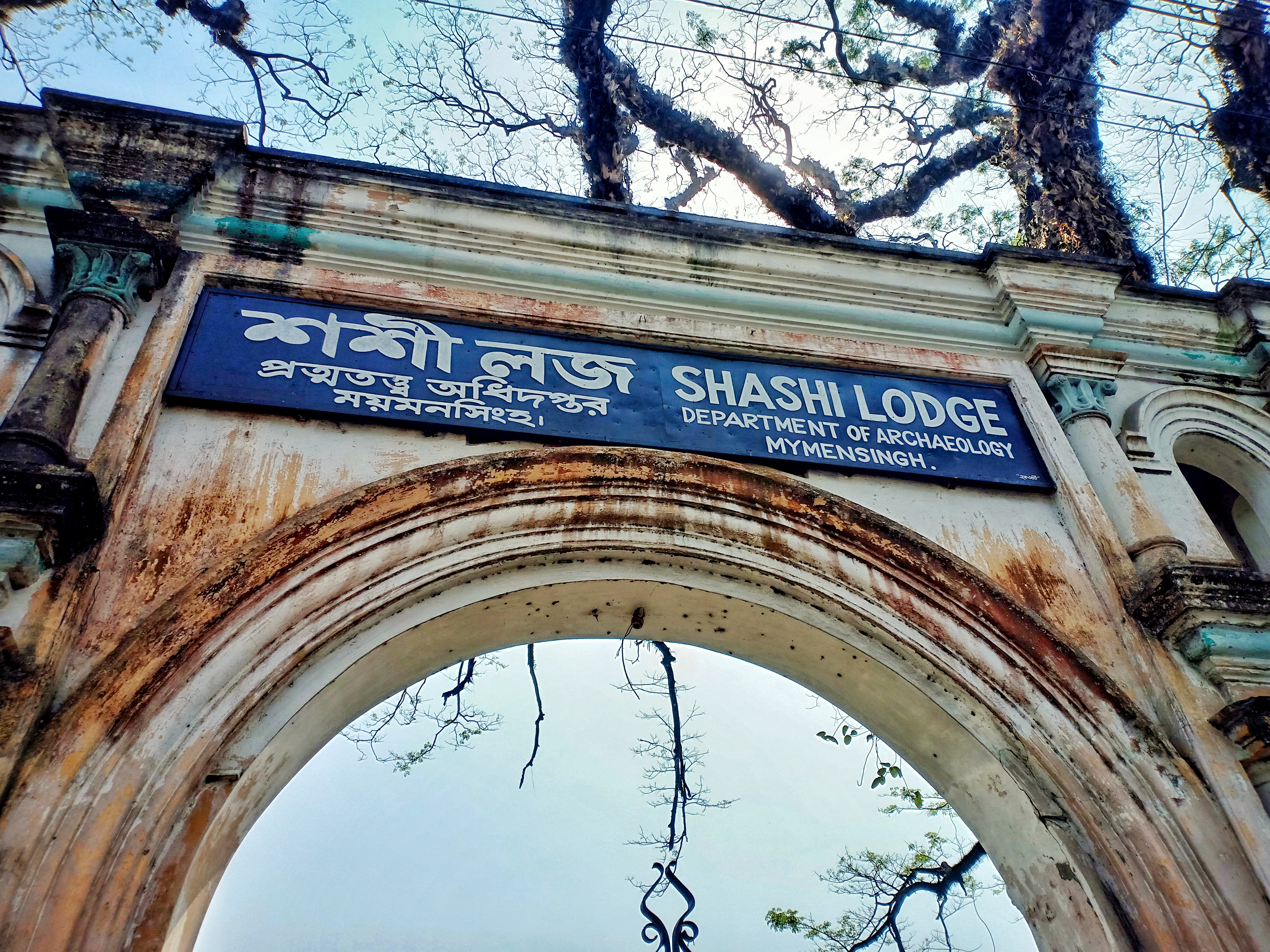

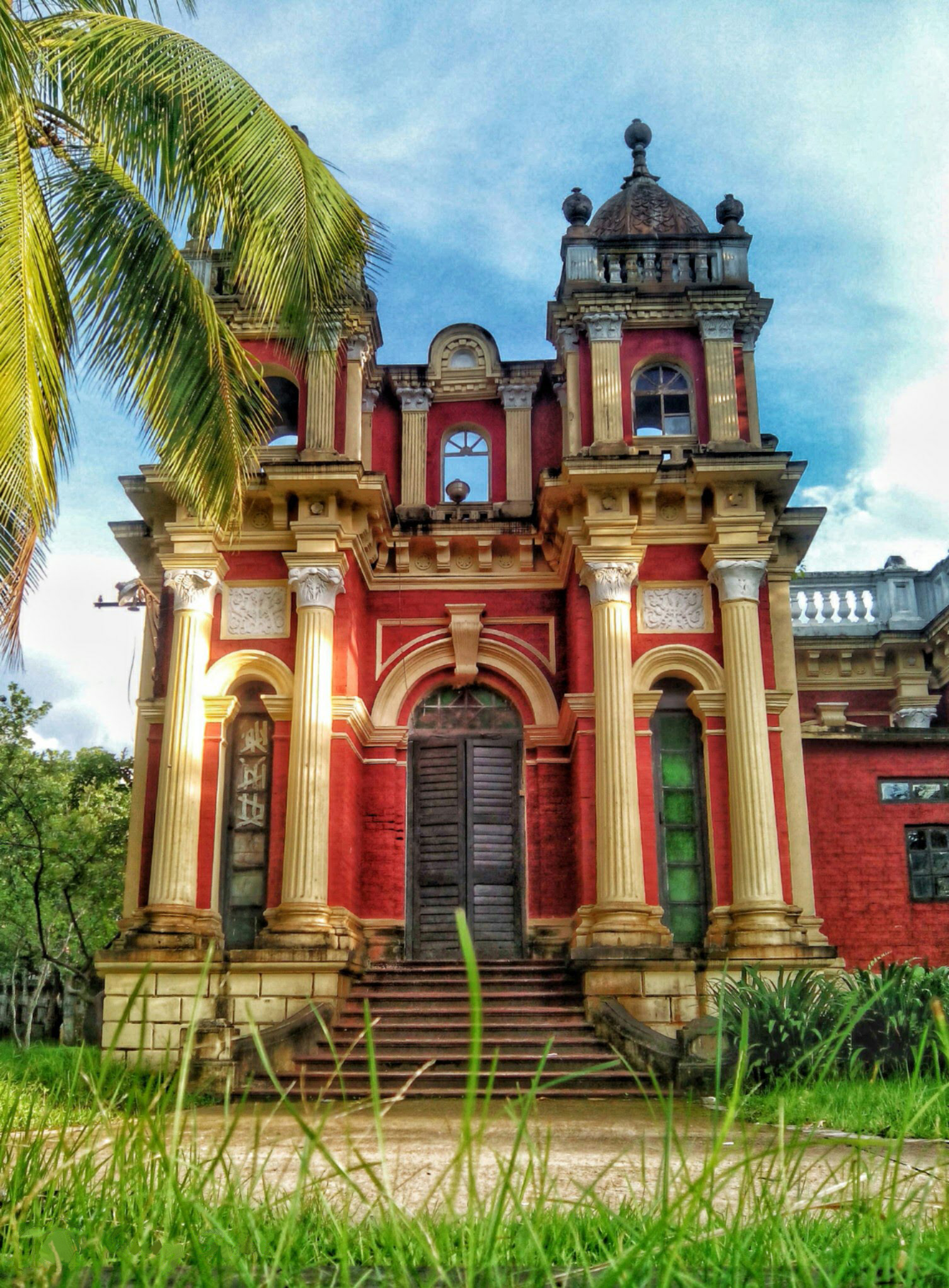

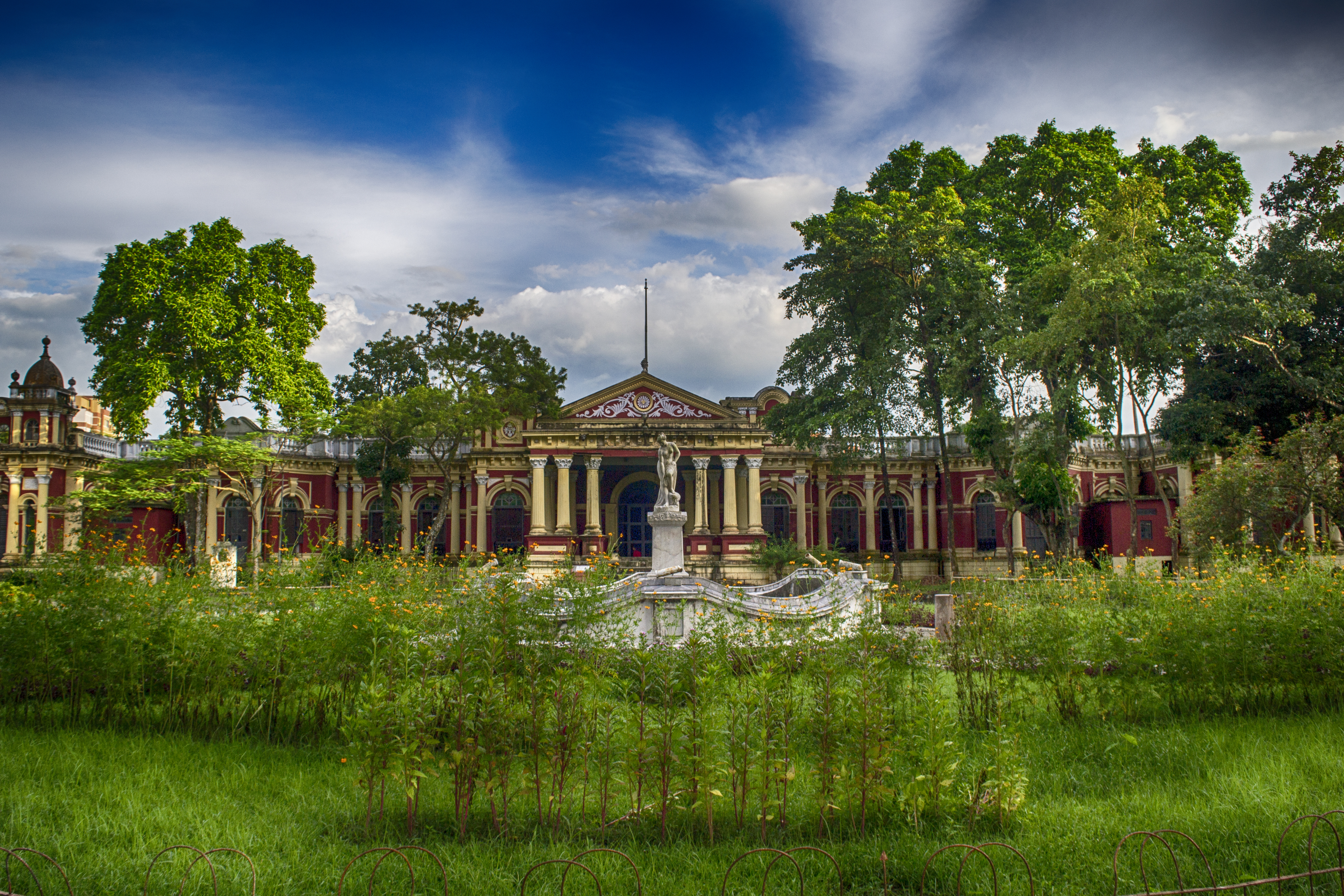

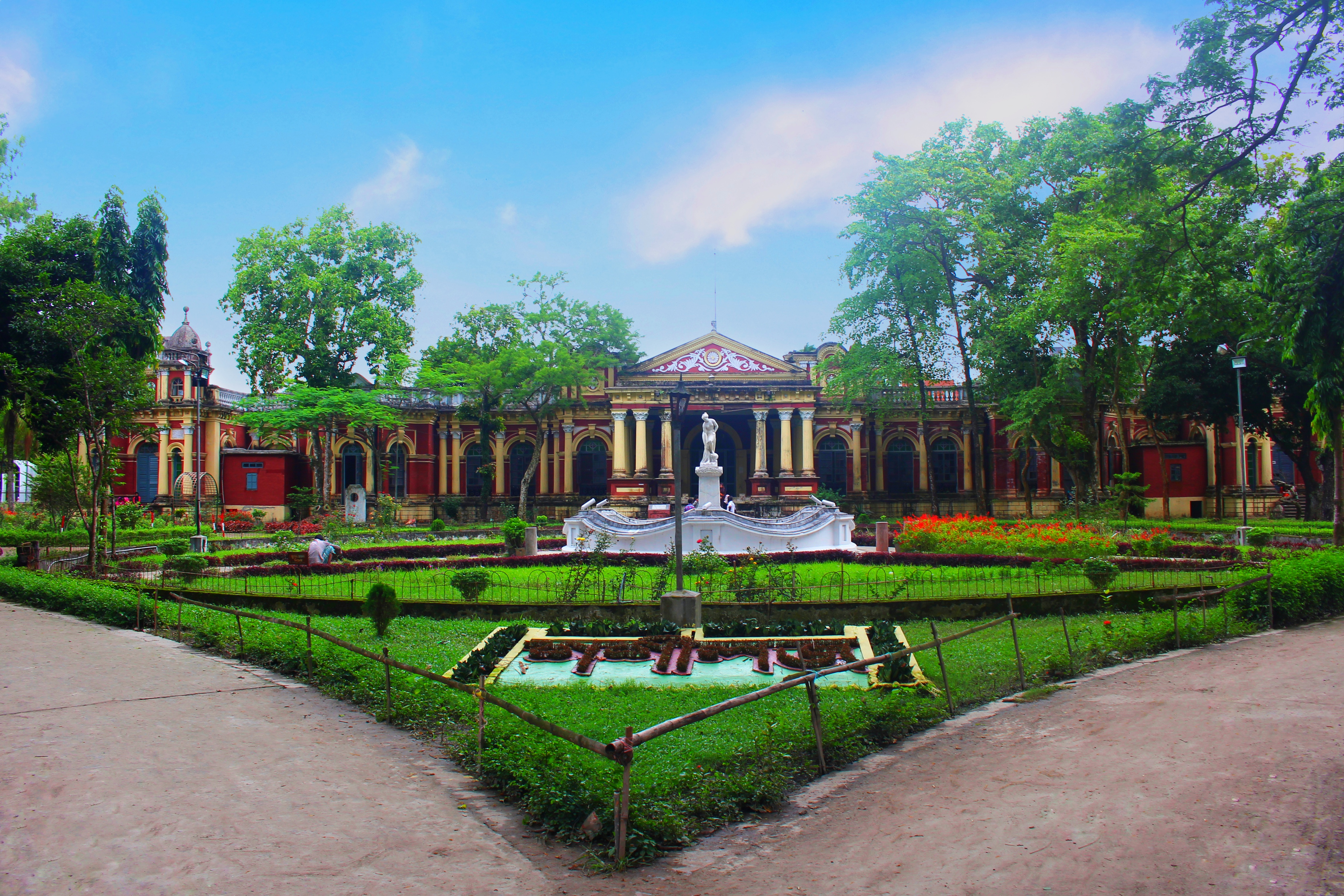

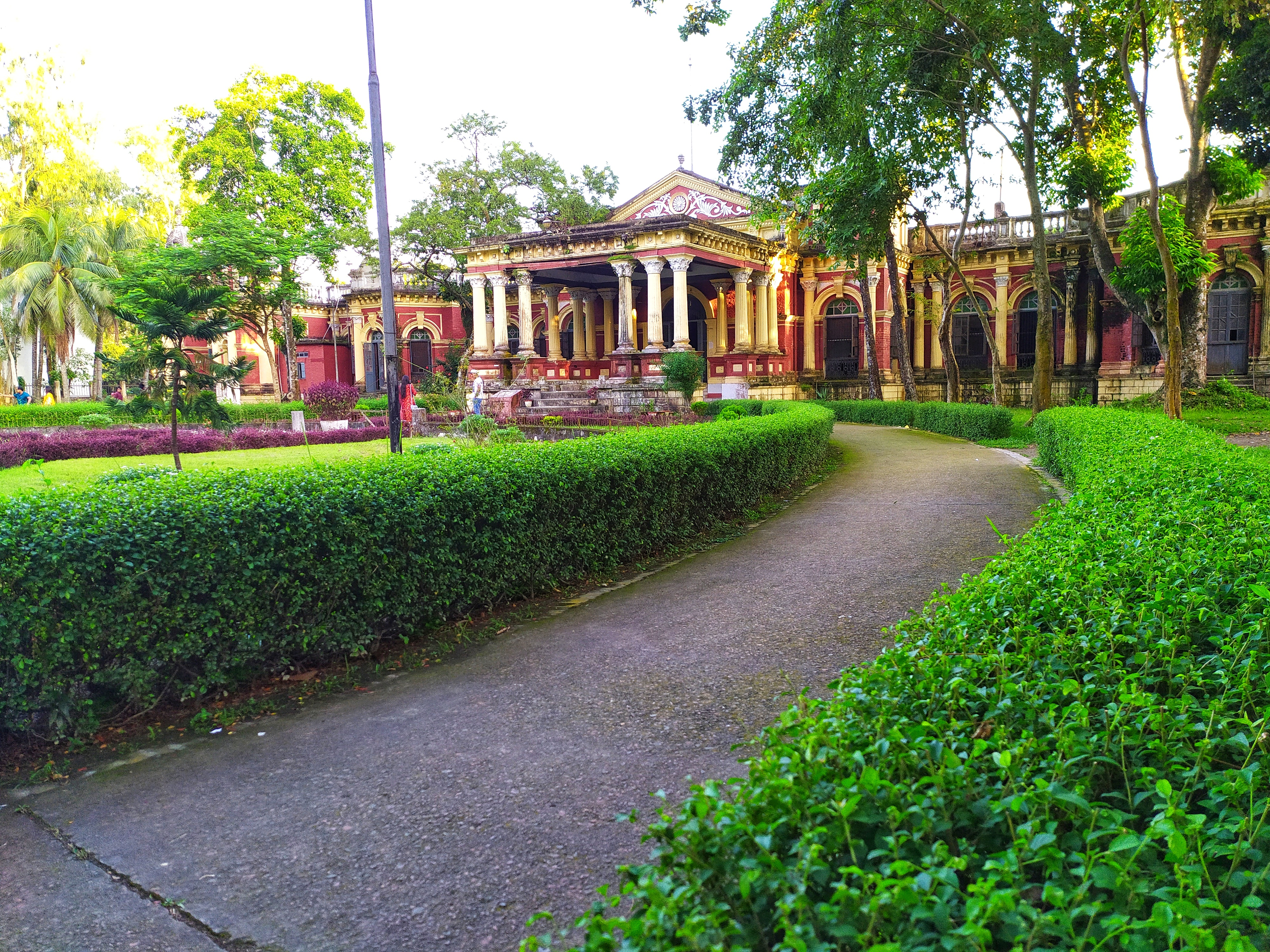

== See also ==
- List of archaeological sites in Bangladesh
