= Mymensingh Museum =

Museum in Mymensingh, Bangladesh

- ময়মনসিংহ জাদুঘর
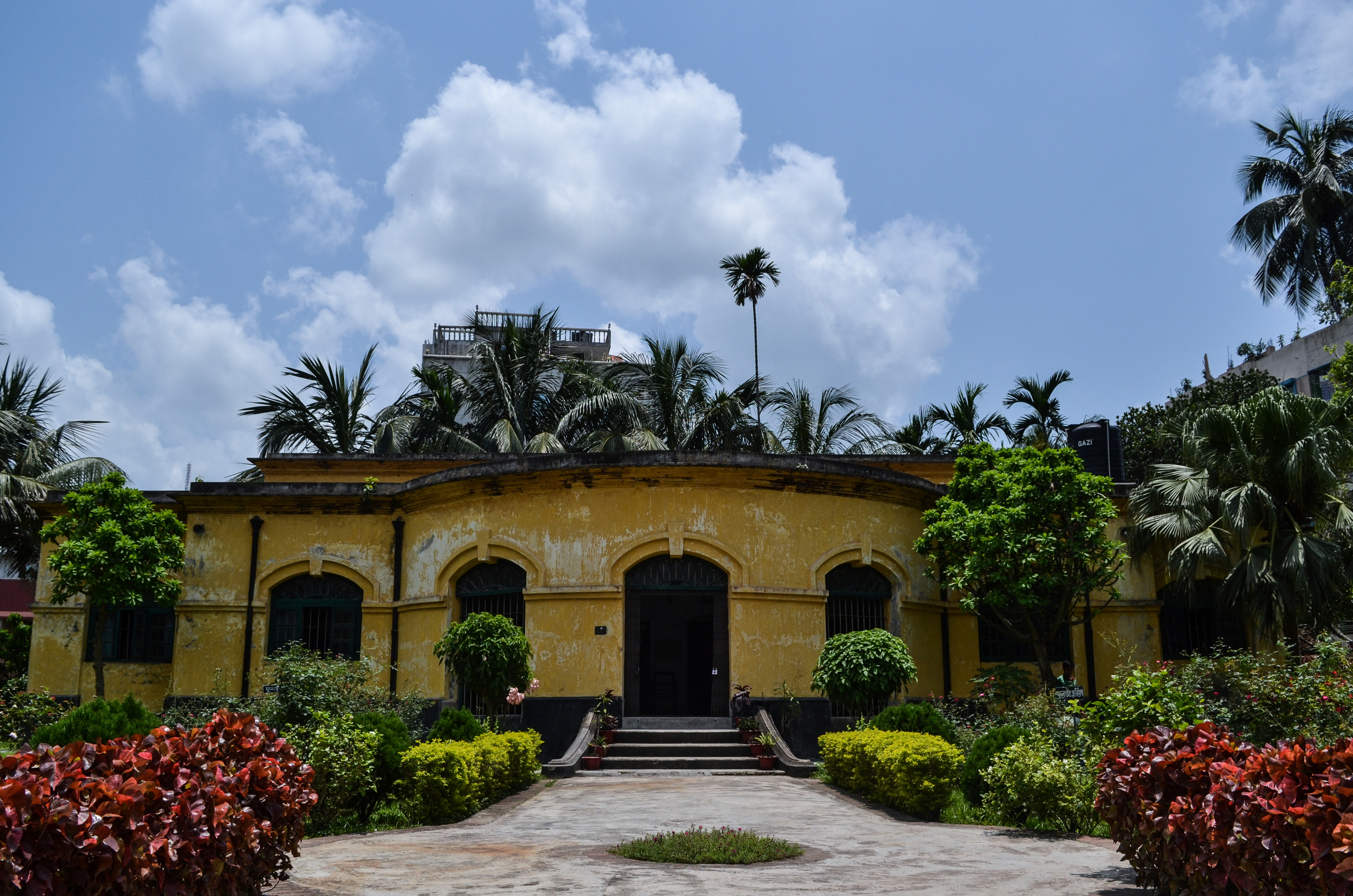

- Location within Bangladesh
- Established: 1969
- Location: bagan bari ("garden house") of zamindar Madan Babu at 17 Amrita Babu Road, Mymensingh, Bangladesh
- Coordinates: 24.7609°N 90.4056°E
- Collections: manuscripts and coins

Mymensingh Museum (Bengali: ময়মনসিংহ জাদুঘর) is located at the Baganbari of zamindar Madan Babu at 17 Amrita Babu Road, Mymensingh, Bangladesh. The museum, which began as an important regional institution for preservation of locally collected historical evidence, lacks proper preservation. Its objective is to preserve the rare and unique relics of local architecture, sculpture, metal works, utensils, handwritten scripts on paper and leaf, and commercial products. Collected from the palaces of Mymensingh District zamindars, the museum's initial collection included 214 articles. They are housed in three rooms within the museum.

== History ==
The museum was established in 1969 at the initiative of the-then Deputy Commissioner of Mymensingh. Initially run by the Mymensingh Municipality, the Department of Archaeology, Cultural Affairs Ministry took charge of the museum in 1989. By 1995, it was enlisted in the gazette.

== Collections ==
The collection includes manuscripts and coins, though many are not on display due to insufficient showcase space. A peacock mummy comes from Mymensingh Medical College. Bamboo and cane items, preserved birds, photographs and pottery were damaged during a renovation in 1999–2001.

Several articles were collected from zamindar palaces. The Muktagacha zamindar palace contribution includes a stone flower vase, a compass, antique clocks, Bakharee (an ornament), pottery, weaving machines, ornamental flower tub stands, candle stands, iron shelves and sports items; statuary and sculptures include those of Saraswati, Vishnu, and a dragon; natural history items include a tiger head, two deer heads, and the head of a wild bull. Elephant heads, a sofa set, Italian statues, and a huge shade used during hunting come from the Gouripur zamindar palace. A rhinoceros hide and a table with a marble stone top were acquired from The Atharabari zamindar palace. The museum contains many paintings of rural Bengal.
