= List of Bangladeshi Hindus =

This is an incomplete list of notable and prominent Hindus from Bangladesh.

== Bangladesh Liberation War ==
- Dhirendranath Datta, martyred intellectual, politician
- Jagat Joity Das (Bir Bikrom), founder of Das Party, martyred freedom fighter
- Govinda Chandra Dev, martyred intellectual, scholar, philosopher, Dhaka University professor
- Jogesh Chandra Ghosh, martyred intellectual, scholar, Ayurveda practitioner, entrepreneur and philanthropist
- Jyotirmoy Guhathakurta, martyred intellectual, scholar, Dhaka University professor
- Dr. Santosh Chandra Bhattacharya, martyred intellectual, scholar, Dhaka University professor
- Ranada Prasad Saha, businessman and philanthropist, martyred during the War of Liberation.
- Bishnu Chattopadhyay, freedom fighter and leader of peasant movement, martyred during the War of Liberation
- Nutan Chandra Singha, martyred intellectual, industrialist, a pioneer of women's education in Chittagong, a social reformer and a charitable man
- Sukharanjan Samaddar, martyred freedom fighter, Sanskrit scholar, educationalist, Rajshahi University professor
- Saroj Kumar Nath Adhikari, martyred intellectual, educationist
- Harinath Dey, martyred intellectual, biochemist, research scientist
- Anudvaipayan Bhattacharya, martyred intellectual, lecturer in Physics, Dhaka University
- Laxman Das, martyred intellectual
- Madhusudan Dey, martyred intellectual, social worker and businessman
- Moni Singh, freedom fighter, communist leader
- Chitta Ranjan Dutta (Bir Uttam), sector commander during the War of Liberation
- Manik Lal Ray, freedom fighter, communist politician, teacher, pioneer of mass-education
- Purnendu Dastidar, freedom fighter, communist leader, writer and lawyer
- Ashalata Baidya, freedom fighter and the only female commander of an all-women guerrilla group during the Bangladesh Liberation War
- Suranjit Sengupta, freedom fighter, politician
- Monikrishna Sen, freedom fighter, Bangladeshi communist revolutionary
- Ashutosh Bhardwaj, freedom fighter, Bangladeshi communist revolutionary
- Bipul Bhattacharya, freedom fighter, vocalist of Swadhin Bangla Betar Kendra during Bangladesh liberation war
- Pankaj Bhattacharya, coordinator of the NAP-Communist Party-Students Union Special Guerrilla Forces

== Politics ==
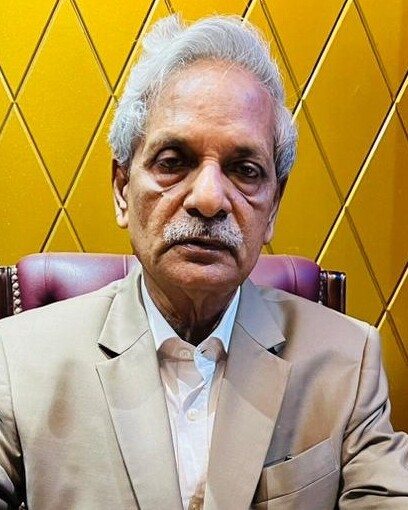
- Nitai Roy Chowdhury
  Manorama Basu, political activist, social reformer
- Pijush Kanti Bhattacharjee, former Member of Parliament
- Shukhen Bhattacharjee, martyred communist politician, pre-independence politician of Bangladesh
- Swapan Bhattacharjee, former Member of Parliament
- Ajay Bhattacharya, revolutionary activist, communist politician, historian, and writer
- Chitra Bhattacharya, former Member of Parliament
- Paritosh Chakrabarti, former Member of Parliament, vice-president of Rangpur District unit of Bangladesh Nationalist Party
- Gaan Chakraborty, Bangladeshi communist revolutionary and writer
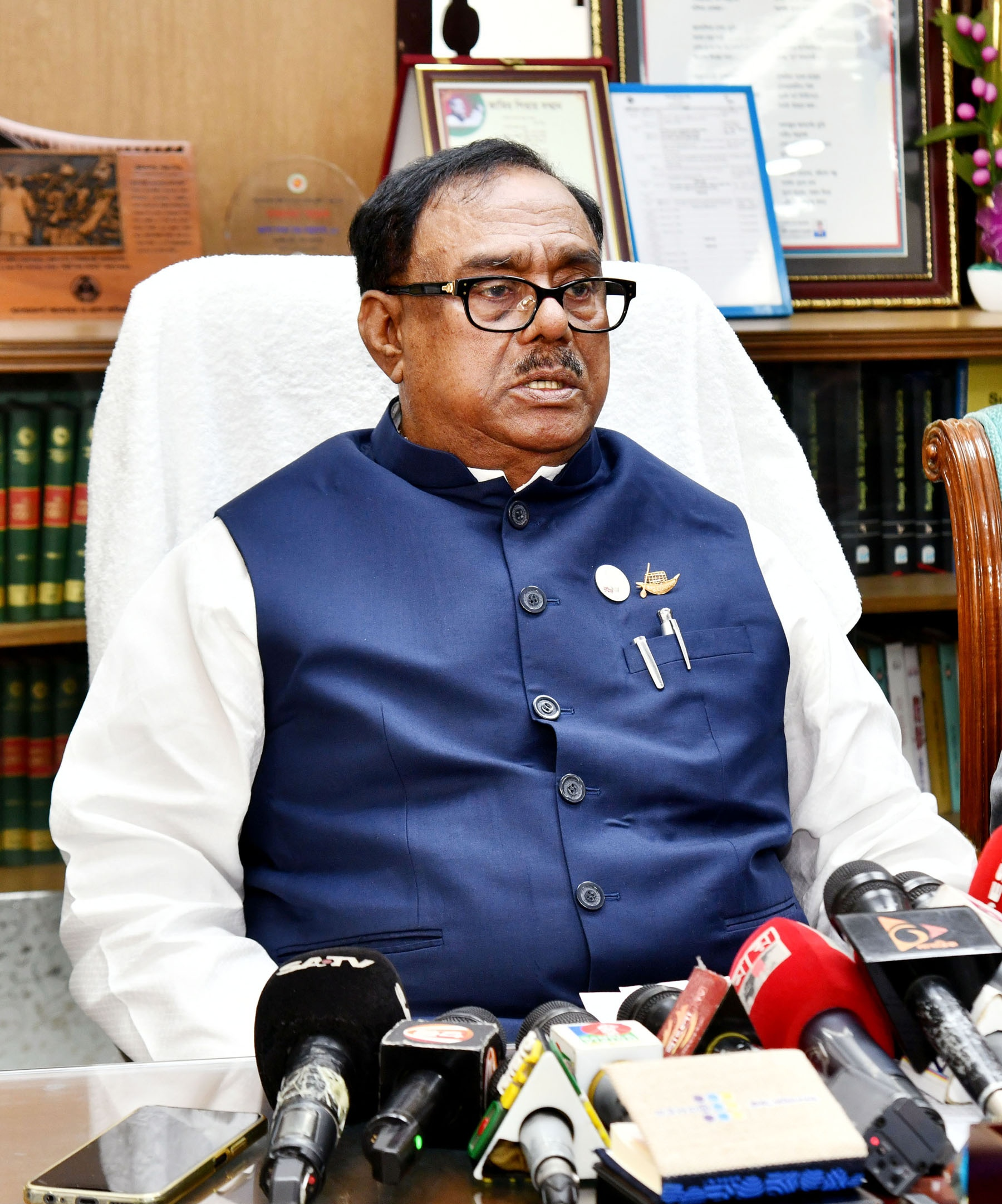
- Sadhan Chandra Majumder
  Ruma Chakraborty, former Member of Parliament
- Sourendra Nath Chakraborty, former Member of Parliament
- Trailokyanath Chakravarty, pre-independence politician of Bangladesh
- Raj Kumar Chakraverty, pre-independence politician of Bangladesh
- Gautam Chakroborty, former Member of Parliament, Bangladesh Nationalist Party politician
- Narayan Chandra Chanda, Former Member of Parliament, Former Minister of Land
- Sris Chandra Chattopadhyaya, pre-independence politician of Bangladesh
- Bhupati Bhushan Chowdhury, Bangladeshi politician, freedom fighter and businessman
- Binod Bihari Chowdhury, Bangladeshi social worker and an anti-colonial revolutionary, politician, one of the companions of Surya Sen during Chittagong armoury raid
- Nipun Roy Chowdhury, Bangladesh Nationalist Party politician, lawyer, activist
- Nitai Roy Chowdhury, current Minister of Cultural Affairs and Member of Parliament, vice chairman of the Central Committee of Bangladesh Nationalist Party
- Shankar Gobind Chowdhury, former Member of Parliament, freedom fighter
- Mrinal Kanti Das, former Member of Parliament
- Nalini Das, revolutionary, communist politician
- Sukhendu Dastidar, revolutionary, Bangladeshi communist leader, freedom fighter, one of the companions of Surya Sen during Chittagong armoury raid
- Pran Gopal Datta, former Member of Parliament
- Pulin De, politician, professor
- Manoranjan Dhar, Bangladeshi politician, diplomat, lawyer
- Aroma Dutta, Bangladeshi politician and human rights activist
- Chitta Ranjan Dutta, a leader of the minority communities, former military personnel
- Kamini Kumar Dutta, pre-independence politician of Bangladesh
- Manoranjan Shill Gopal, former Member of Parliament
- Debendra Nath Ghosh, politician
- Jiten Ghosh, revolutionary, communist leader, writer and freedom fighter
- Sunil Kumar Gupta, former Member of Parliament, Jatiya Party (Ershad) and Bangladesh Nationalist Party politician
- Gopal Krishna Maharatna, politician, one of the founding members of Sarbadaliya Sangram Parishad, social worker
- Ranesh Maitra, Bangladeshi politician, journalist and columnist
- Jnanendra Chandra Majumdar, pre-independence politician of Bangladesh
- Manu Majumdar, former Member of Parliament
- Phani Bhushan Majumder, former Member of Parliament
- Sadhan Chandra Majumder, former Member of Parliament, former Minister of Food
- Nani Gopal Mandal, former Member of Parliament
- Anil Chandra Mukhopadhyay, Bangladeshi communist revolutionary and writer
- Bhabesh Chandra Nandi, pre-independence politician of Bangladesh
- Pankaj Nath, former Member of Parliament
- Soumendra Prasad Pandey, former Member of Parliament
- Barun Roy, Bangladeshi communist leader, freedom fighter, former Member of Parliament
- Gayeshwar Chandra Roy, current Member of Parliament, vice-president of Bangladesh Nationalist Party
- Rupnarayan Roy, communist and peasant leader
- Satish Chandra Roy, former Member of Parliament
- Dhirendra Nath Saha, former Member of Parliament, Bangladesh Nationalist Party politician
- Hemonto Sarkar, Bangladeshi communist revolutionary and writer
- Ranjit Chandra Sarkar, former Member of Parliament
- Amal Sen, Bangladeshi communist politician, founding president of the Workers Party of Bangladesh
- Bijan Sen, martyred communist politician, pre-independence politician of Bangladesh
- Dr. Samanta Lal Sen, former Member of Parliament, former Minister of Health and Family Planning
- Ramesh Chandra Sen, former Member of Parliament
- Sailendra Kumar Sen, pre-independence politician of Bangladesh
- Satindranath Sen, revolutionary, pre-independence politician of Bangladesh
- Joya Sengupta, former Member of Parliament
- Suranjit Sengupta, former Member of Parliament
- Dhirendra Debnath Shambhu, former Member of Parliament
- Biren Sikder, former Member of Parliament
- Kamparam Singh, martyred communist politician, pre-independence politician of Bangladesh
- Comrade Moni Singh, founding general secretary of Bangladesh Communist Party
- Kujendra Lal Tripura, Former Member of Parliament, Former State Minister of Ministry of Chittagong Hill Tracts Affairs

== Advisers of interim/caretaker governments ==
- Bimalendu Bikash Roy Chowdhury
- BK Das
- Dhiraj Kumar Nath
- Bidhan Ranjan Roy
- Manik Lal Samaddar

== Justices of the Supreme Court of Bangladesh ==
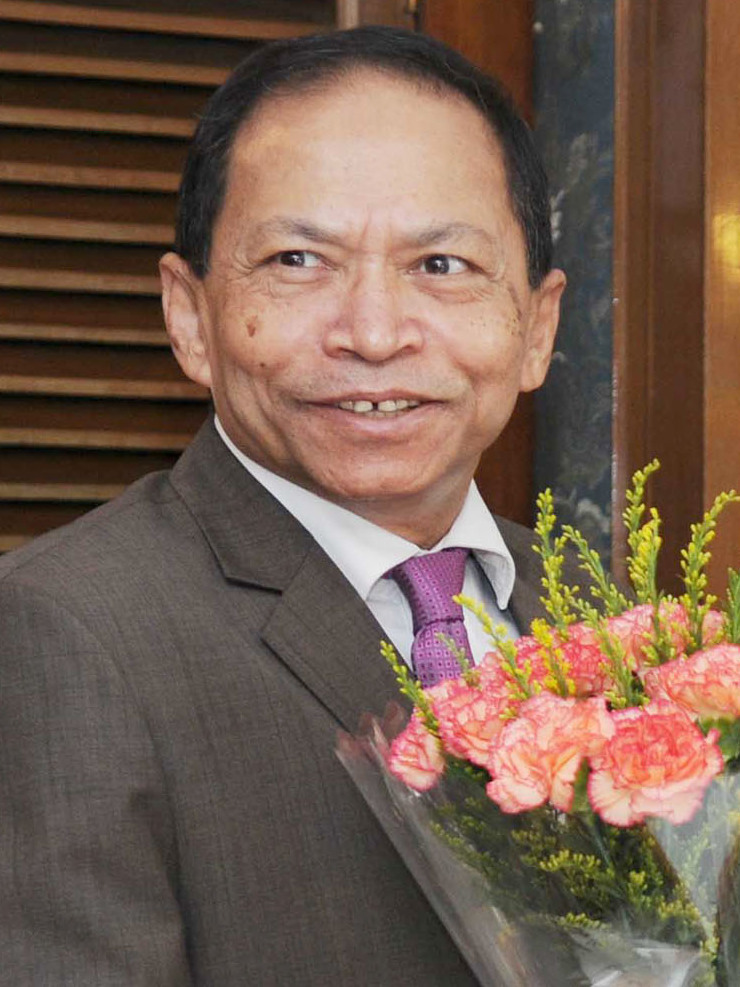
- Surendra Kumar Sinha,21st Chief Justice of Bangladesh
  Surendra Kumar Sinha, Chief Justice of Bangladesh (2015–2017)
- Bhishmadev Chakrabortty, justice of the High Court Division
- Bimalendu Bikash Roy Chowdhury, former justice and adviser of Caretaker Government
- Debasish Roy Chowdhury, justice of the High Court Division
- Ashish Ranjan Daash, justice of the High Court Division
- Biswajit Debnath, justice of the High Court Division
- Krishna Debnath, justice of the High Court Division
- Bhabani Prasad Singha, justice of the High Court Division
- Gour Gopal Saha, justice of the High Court Division
- Sashanka Shekhar Sarkar, justice of the High Court Division
- Gobinda Chandra Tagore, justice of the High Court Division

== Military and police ==
- Chitta Ranjan Dutta (Bir Uttam), retired major general
- Jibon Kanai Das, retired major general
- Banaj Kumar Majumder, Inspector-general of police
- Devdas Bhattacharya, Inspector-general of police
- Krishna Pada Roy, Inspector-general of police
- Proloy Kumar Joarder, superintendent of police

== Civil service ==
- Sunil Kanti Bose, former Secretary of the Ministry of Posts, Telecommunications and Information Technology and the former chairperson of Bangladesh Telecommunication Regulatory Commission
- Pradip Ranjan Chakrabarty, retired Secretary, Chairman of the Bangladesh Competition Commission
- Phani Bhoushon Choudhury, Secretary of the government of Bangladesh, member of the Bangladesh Public Service Commission, chief of the Criminal Investigation Department, former police officer
- Sitangshu Kumar Chowdhury, former deputy governor of Bangladesh Bank and former banking reform adviser for the Central Bank
- Jishnu Roy Chowdhury, former ambassador of Bangladesh to Bhutan
- Dhananjay Kumar Das, former joint secretary of the Ministry of Home Affairs
- Satyajit Karmaker, Secretary of the Planning Division
- Mihir Kanti Majumder, retired secretary of the Ministry of Environment, Forest and Climate Change and chairman of Environment, Climate Change and Social Development Initiatives
- Shib Nath Roy, Bangladeshi civil servant, former Ambassador of Bangladesh to Bhutan
- Manik Lal Samaddar, Bangladeshi civil servant and former special assistant to the Chief Advisor of the Caretaker government
- Nepal Chandra Sarker, retired Bangladeshi Civil Servant and former Commissioner of the Information Commission
- Sukesh Kumar Sarker, Director General (Secretary) of NAPD

== Law ==
- Debesh Bhattacharya, Human rights activist, lawyer, jurist and judge
- Nikhilesh Dutta, Deputy Attorney General, Bangladeshi barrister and activist
- Rana Dasgupta, Senior Advocate and General Secretary of the Bangladesh Hindu Buddhist Christian Unity Council

== Activism ==
- Purabi Basu
- Barada Bhushan Chakraborty
- Jharna Dhara Chowdhury
- Hena Das
- Suhasini Das
- Sitesh Ranjan Deb
- Aroma Dutta
- Debendra Nath Ghosh
- Meghna Guhathakurta
- Kumudini Hajong
- Ranesh Maitra
- Manik Lal Ray

== Arts ==
- Shishir Bhattacharjee, cartoonist, academic
- Devdas Chakraborty, fine artist, Chittagong University professor
- Samarjit Roy Chowdhury, one of the pioneers of contemporary art in Bangladesh, Dhaka University professor
- Shib Narayan Das, designer of the first national flag of Bangladesh, vexillographer, student leader
- Dhruba Esh, cover-artist and writer
- Uttam Guho, stage and art director
- Kalidas Karmakar, painter
- Nitun Kundu, sculptor, businessman
- Partha Pratim Majumder, pioneer mime-artist
- Sarker Protick or Protick Sarkar

== Music ==
- Sanjit Acharya, Chittagonian folk lyricist, playwright, singer
- Shayan Chowdhury Arnob, singer-songwriter, artist
- Shyam Sundar Baishnab, folk singer
- Bipul Bhattacharya, producer, composer, music director and folk music artist
- Deebo Bhattacharya, musician, painter and singer
- Kumar Bishwajit, pop singer
- Dia Chakravarty, singer, political activist, tax consultant, barrister, journalist
- Amaresh Roy Chowdhury, classical vocalist
- Gouri Choudhury, singer and music teacher
- Probal Chowdhury, singer
- Sanjeeb Chowdhury, singer-songwriter, member of Dalchhut
- Tapan Chowdhury, singer of modern songs and former frontmant of Souls
- Alaka Das, classical music artist
- Haimanti Rakshit Das, playback singer
- Kalipada Das, singer
- Ramkanai Das, folk and classical musician
- Samar Das, music composer
- Subal Das, music director and composer
- Sudhin Das, Nazrul Sangeet artist and Swaralipikar
- Kamal Dasgupta, music director
- Sunil Dhar, classical musician
- Shuvro Dev, pop-artist, singer-songwriter, music director, composer
- Asit Dey, classical musician
- Pabitra Mohan Dey, instrumental musician
- Kalyani Ghosh, singer of Chittagonian folk
- Robin Ghosh, music director
- Shefali Ghosh, singer of mostly Chittagonian folk music
- Priyanka Gope, singer
- Pantho Kanai, singer, member of Bangla, Arnab and Friends
- Bappa Mazumder (Shubhashish Mazumder Bappa), singer, and son of Ustad Barin Mazumder, member of Dalchhut
- Chandana Mazumdar, Lalon-geeti singer
- Ila Majumder, Bangladeshi classical vocalist
- Ustad Barin Mazumder, classical singer
- Mitali Mukherjee, Bangladeshi classical and playback singer
- Mihir Kumar Nandi, Bangladeshi Rabindra Sangeet singer and classical vocalist
- Subir Nandi, singer
- Timir Nandi, singer, writer, activist, anchor
- Ajit Roy, Rabindra Sangeet singer
- Anima Roy, Rabindra Sangeet singer
- Kiran Chandra Roy, playback singer
- Rathindranath Roy, singer
- Emon Saha, music director
- Satya Saha, music director
- Bijoy Sarkar, baul singer, lyricist, composer and poet
- Chandan Sinha, playback singer, producer
- Shujeo Shyam, singer, composer and music director
- Niloy Das, singer, guitarist.

== Cinema and television ==
- Apu Biswas
  Animesh Aich, director
- Naresh Bhuiyan, actor
- Amalendu Biswas, stage actor of the jatra-pala genre
- Anam Biswas, director, screenwriter, composer and writer
- Moutushi Biswas, television and film actress
- Pijush Bandyopadhyay, actor, director, CEO of Ekushey Television
- Dilip Biswas, director
- Malay Bhowmick, actor, director and educationist
- Subhasish Bhowmik, actor
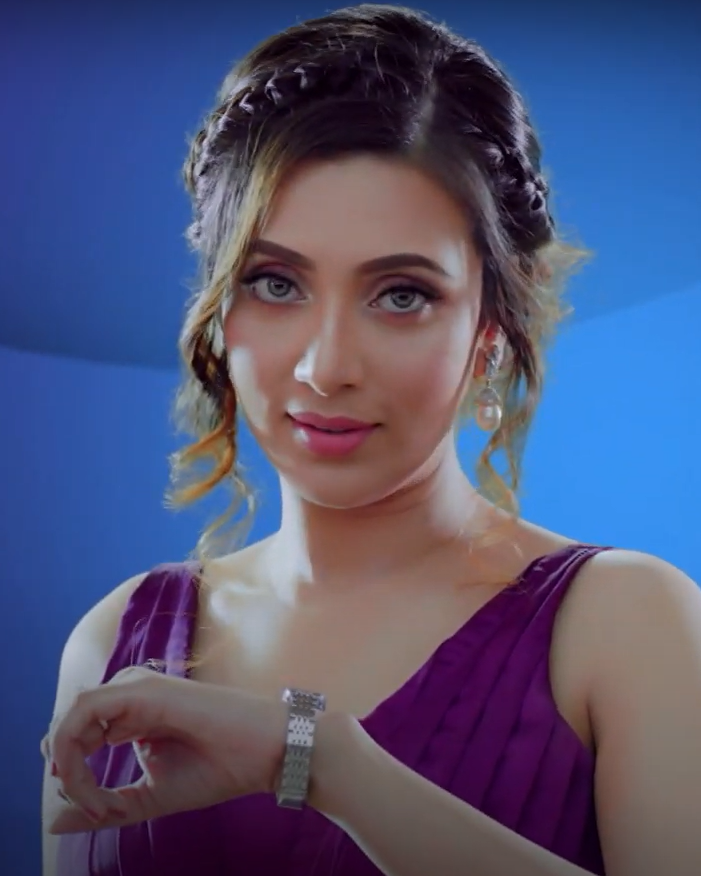
- Bidya Sinha Saha Mim
  Apu Biswas, contemporary actress
- Aruna Biswas, television, stage and film actress
- Jyotsna Biswas, stage-actress of jatra-pala genre, recipient of Ekushey Padak
- Amol Bose, actor
- Jewel Aich, magician
- Jayanta Chattopadhyay, actor
- Jumbo, actor
- Bappy Chowdhury, actor
- Chanchal Chowdhury, actor, singer, lecturer
- Chayanika Chowdhury, television drama director
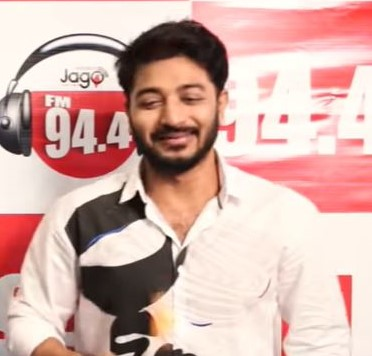
- Bappy Chowdhury
  Brindaban Das, Bangladeshi playwright, actor, writer and director
- Shankha Dasgupta, director, filmmaker
- Sumita Devi (Hena Bhattacharya), actress
- Sumit Sengupta, actor
- Dipankar Sengupta Dipon, director, screenwriter
- Sanchita Datta, actress, model and lawyer
- Subhash Dutta, filmmaker, actor
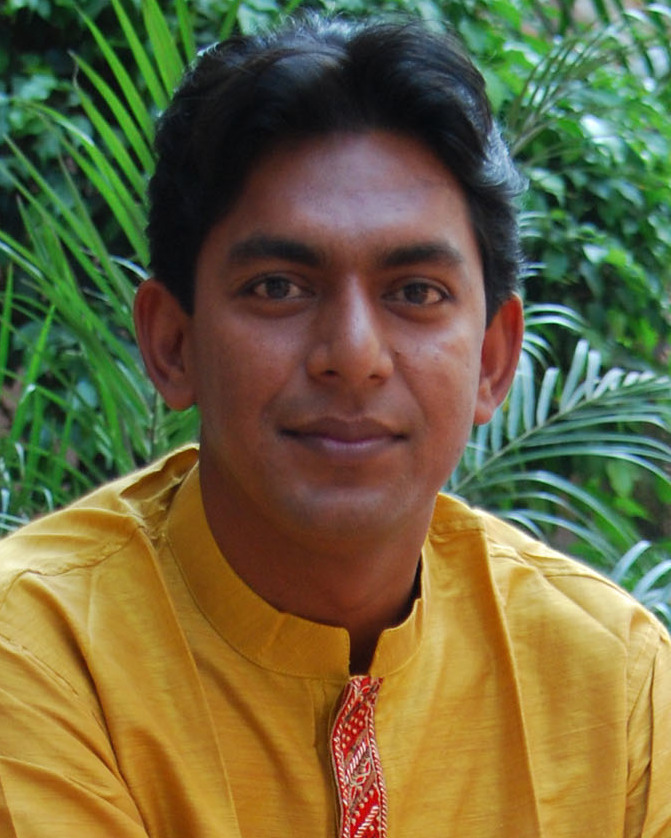
- Chanchal Chowdhury
  Anju Ghosh, actress, starred in record-breaking Beder Meye Josna
- Aparna Ghosh, contemporary actress
- Maya Ghosh, actress
- Chitralekha Guho, television actress
- Urmila Srabonti Kar, contemporary television actress
- Tamalika Karmakar, actress and model
- Ashish Kumar Louho, film actor, playwright, dialogue writer and story writer
- Bidya Sinha Saha Mim, contemporary actress
- Ramendu Majumdar, actor and theatre-activist
- Narayan Ghosh Mita, film director and writer
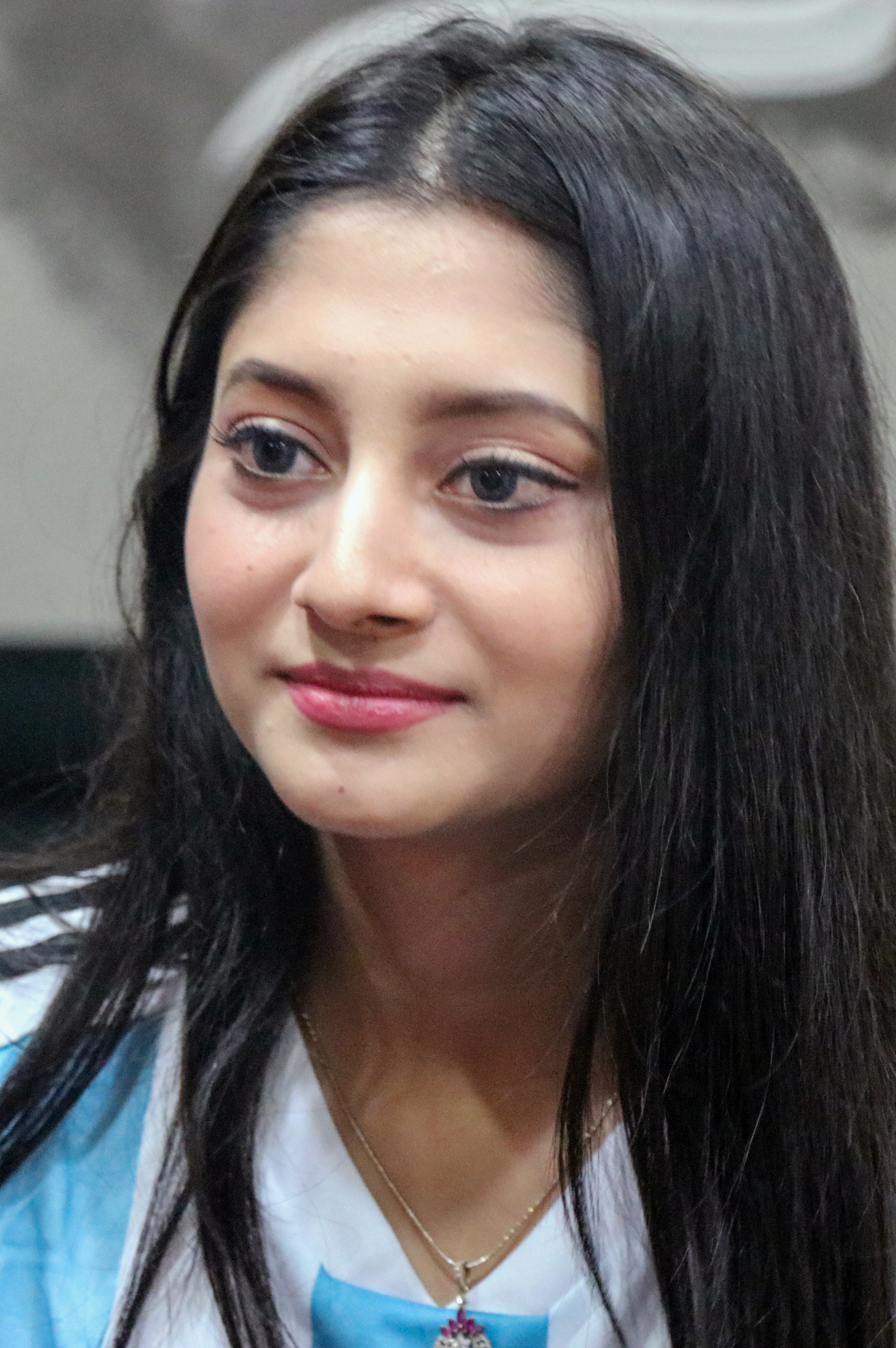
- Puja Cherry
  Kalyan Mitra, writer, actor, director and playwright
- Prabir Mitra, film actor
- Mousumi Nag, actress
- Manoj Pramanik, actor
- Yash Rohan, actor
- Arun Roy, cinematographer
- Puja Cherry Roy, actress
- Sadhan Roy, cinematographer and actor
- Arun Saha, actor
- Bijon Sarkar, photographer, cinematographer
- Shabnam (Jharna Basak), actress
- Shanarei Devi Shanu, television actress and model
- Subrata, actor
- Sujata (Tandra Majumder), actress
- Srabosti Dutta Tinni, television actress and model
- Sushoma Sarkar, television and film actress
- Ratan Talukder, actor and fight director
- Shilpi Sharkar Apu, actress

== Literature ==
- Tapan Bagchi, poet, rhyme composer, researcher, and journalist
- Kajal Bandyopadhyay, poet, translator and academic
- Topon Chakrabarti, writer on science, technology and environment
- Jyoti Prakash Dutta, short-story writer, novelist, newspaper editor and professor
- Nirmalendu Goon, poet
- Dinesh Chandra Sen, writer
- Karunamaya Goswami, musicologist and litterateur
- Bimal Guha, poet and academic
- Jibanananda Das, poet
- Rassundari Devi, 19th century novelist
- Ranesh Das Gupta, writer, journalist, and politician
- Harishankar Jaladas, novelist
- Rajanikanta Sen, writer and composer
- Gobindachandra Das, poet
- Michael Madhusudan Dutt, poet and playwright
- Girish Chandra Sen, translator
- Nabinchandra Sen, poet and writer
- Hara Prasad Shastri, writer
- Radhapada Roy, poet
- Upendrakishore Ray Chowdhury, writer
- Mahadev Saha, poet
- Ashim Saha, poet and novelist.
- Arunabh Sarkar, poet, columnist, literary-editor and freedom fighter
- Satyen Sen, author, founder of Udichi
- Nikhil Sen, dramatist
- Vijay Gupta, medieval poet
- Niloy Chatterjee, atheist blogger and writer of Hindu origin, martyred by extremists
- Ananta Bijoy Das, atheist blogger and writer of Hindu origin, martyred by extremists
- Avijit Roy, atheist blogger and writer of Hindu origin, martyred by extremists
- Malay Bhowmick, playwright and academic

== Academia ==
- Debapriya Bhattacharya, Bangladeshi economist and public policy analyst
- Satya Prasad Majumder, 14th Vice-Chancellor of BUET
- Shishir Bhattacharja, writer, researcher, linguist, professor of French
- Swadesh Bose, economist and Language-movement activist
- Govinda Chandra Dev, martyred academic, philosopher, Dhaka University professor
- Santosh Chandra Bhattacharya, martyred academic, scholar, Dhaka University professor
- Sukharanjan Samaddar, martyred freedom fighter, Sanskrit scholar, educationalist, Rajshahi University professor
- Soumitra Sekhar Dey, 6th Vice-chancellor of Jatiya Kabi Kazi Nazrul Islam University
- Anupam Sen, Vice-Chancellor of the Premier University, author, sociologist, and social activist
- Gautam Buddha Das, former Vice-chancellor of Chittagong Veterinary and Animal Sciences University (CVASU)
- Swadesh Chandra Samanta, Bangladeshi Agronomist and Vice-chancellor of Patuakhali Science and Technology University
- Biswajit Ghosh, first Vice-Chancellor of the Rabindra University, Dhaka University professor, essayist, researcher and academic
- Subhagata Choudhury, health science writer and professor, former principal of Chittagong Medical College
- Arup Ratan Choudhury, dental surgeon, consultant and academician
- Neem Chandra Bhowmik, professor at Dhaka University and a leader of the hindu minority community in Bangladesh
- Rangalal Sen, academician and writer
- Kaberi Gayen, columnist, academic
- Meghna Guhathakurta, academic, activist
- Ajoy Roy, academic and leader of secular-humanist movement in Bangladesh
- Sanat Kumar Saha, essayist, economist, professor and Tagore-exponent
- Jatin Sarker, author and Marxist philosopher
- Chittaranjan Saha, educationist

== Science and technology ==
- Harinath Dey, biochemist, research scientist, martyred intellectual
- Rakhal Chandra Das, physician, martyred intellectual
- Arun Kumar Basak, physicist, professor
- Purabi Basu, pharmacologist, writer and activist
- Baren Chakraborty, physician, writer, professor
- Suvagoto Chowdhury, physician, writer, professor
- Pran Gopal Datta, physician, ex-vice chancellor of BSMRMU and member of parliament
- Debjani Ghosh, researcher, engineer
- Hiranmay Sen Gupta, nuclear physicist, professor
- Ripon Nath, audio engineer
- Bibhuti Roy, researcher, engineer, professor
- Shuvo Roy, research scientist, bioengineer, writer
- Samir Kumar Saha, microbiologist, public health expert, professor
- Senjuti Saha, research scientist
- Dwijen Sharma, naturalist and science writer
- Bijan Kumar Shill, microbiologist, scholar, and teacher
- Pranab Kumar Chowdhury, Bangladeshi pediatrician, academic and fiction-writer.

== Journalism ==
- Gautam Das, print journalist and bureau chief of Dainik Samakal
- Ajoy Dasgupta, journalist, writer and lecturer at Dhaka University and Jagannath University
- Shyamal Dutta, journalist and editor of Bhorer Kagoj
- Samudra Gupta, poet and journalist
- Santosh Gupta, journalist and writer
- Ranesh Maitra, journalist, columnist and politician
- Subhash Singha Roy, journalist, columnist and politician
- Swadesh Roy, journalist, writer and political analyst
- Manik Chandra Saha, journalist, recipient of Ekushey Padak
- Munni Saha, journalist, television presenter
- Nirmal Kumar Sengupta, journalist, politician

== Business and philanthropy ==
- Subir Chowdhury Bangladeshi-American author, world renowned expert in quality and management and philanthropist (founded the Subir-Maliny Center for Bangladesh Studies at the University of California-Berkeley)
- Nitun Kundu, sculptor and founder of Otobi
- Chittaranjan Saha, entrepeneur, educationist
- Ranada Prasad Saha, entrepreneur, philanthropist, successful businessman, founder of Kumudini College and Kumudini Hospital at Mirzapur Upazila, Tangail)
- Suranjit Dhar,FCA, Chartered Accountants, ICAB

== Sports ==
- Arup Kumar Baidya, football
- Khitindra Chandra Baishya, swimmer
- Tapash Baishya, cricket
- Rajani Kanta Barman, football
- Topu Barman, football
- Biplob Bhattacharjee, football
- Disha Biswas, cricket
- Lily Rani Biswas, cricket
- Kesto Kumar Bose, football
- Puja Chakraborty, cricket
- Narayan Chandra, cricket
- Mithun Chowdhury, football
- Shuvagata Hom Chowdhury, cricket
- Sunil Krishna Dey Chowdhury, football
- Brojen Das, swimmer
- Litton Das, cricket
- Linkon Dey, cricket
- Bishwanath Ghosh, football
- Dhiman Ghosh, cricket
- Pinak Ghosh, cricket
- Taposh Ghosh, cricket
- Asim Gope, hockey
- Alok Kapali, cricket
- Pritom Kumar, cricket
- Pran Govinda Kundu, football
- Shibu Lal, tennis
- Amit Majumder, cricket
- Avishek Mitra, cricket
- Kochi Rani Mondal, kabaddi
- Lata Mondal, cricket
- Arun Nandi, swimmer
- Debabrata Barua Paul, cricket
- Chandon Roy, football
- Dipok Roy, football
- Sandip Roy, cricket
- Subashis Roy, cricket
- Ranjit Saha, football
- Sanjit Saha, cricket
- Sumon Saha, cricket
- Krishna Rani Sarkar, football
- Soumya Sarkar, cricket
- Uttam Sarkar, cricket
- Amalesh Sen, football
- Jony Talukdar, cricket
- Rony Talukdar, cricket
- Bimal Chandra Tarafdar, track and field
- Sushanto Tripura, football

== Religion and spirituality ==
- Chinmoy Krishna Das, Bangladeshi Hindu monk and former ISKCON member
- Mahanambrata Brahmachari, a yogi, monk, philosopher, writer and religious master
- Ram Thakur (Ram Chandra Chakraborty), a yogi, monk and spiritual teacher of Hindu philosophy

== See also ==
- Hinduism in Bangladesh
- Bengali Hindus
- Lists of Hindus
