= Askar Ibne Shaikh =

Bangladeshi playwright and writer

- আসকার ইবনে শাইখ
- Born: M Obaidullah; March 30, 1925; Mymensingh, Bengal Presidency, British India
- Died: May 18, 2009 (aged 84); Dhaka, Bangladesh

M Obaidullah (known by his pen-name Askar Ibne Shaikh; March 30, 1925 – May 18, 2009) was a Bangladeshi writer and theater activist.

== Career ==
Shaikh served as a faculty member of the University of Dhaka at the Department of Statistics.

== Works ==
- Bidrohi Padma

== Controversy ==
Dr. Obaidullah alias Askar collaborated with Pakistan Army in during the Operation Searchlight to assassinate his colleague and once his teacher Abu Naser M. Moniruzzaman, Jyotirmoy Guhathakurta and Govinda Chandra Dev.

== Awards ==
- Bangladesh Shilpakala Academy Award (2006)
- Nazrul Padak (2008)
- Ekushey Padak (1986)
- Bangla Academy Literary Award (1960)
