= List of people from Comilla =

This is a list of notable residents and people who have origins in the Comilla District of Bangladesh. This list also includes British Bangladeshis, Bangladeshi Americans, Bangladeshi Canadians, and other non-resident Bengalis who have origins in the Comilla District.

== Freedom fighters ==
- Shib Narayan Das, member of BLF, one of the designers of the first flag of Bangladesh
- Shaheed Dhirendranath Datta (1886–1971), ex-Minister of Law, Language movement activist and Shaheed of 1971
- Lt-Col. Akbar Hossain (1942–2006), veteran freedom fighter, ex-Minister of Mineral Sources (1978), ex-Minister of Forest Preservation (1991), ex-Minister of Inland Water
- AKM Bahauddin Bahar

== Politicians ==
- Khondaker Mostaq Ahmad (1919-1996), 5th President of Bangladesh and acted as Foreign Minister of Mujibnagar Government during 1971 Liberation War.
- Muzaffar Ahmed (1922-2019), He was a Bangladeshi Politician & Professor. He was an adviser of Provisional Government of Bangladesh during war time in 1971.He was the President of Bangladesh National Awami Party (Pro-Moscow) .
- Kazi Zafar Ahmed (1939-2015), member of the presidium of Jatiya Party, ex-Prime Minister (1988), ex-Minister of Education (1986)
- Ghulam Azam (1922–2014), ex Leader of Bangladesh Jamaat-e-Islami; professor; politician; convicted war criminal
- Khandaker Mosharraf Hossain, member of the standing committee of Bangladesh Nationalist Party, ex-Minister of Energy & Mineral Resources (1991) and ex-Minister of Health & Family Welfare (2001)
- Mustafa Kamal (1947-), politician and cricket official
- Shaukat Mahmood (1959-), senior journalist, editor of Weekly Economic Times, adviser to Begum Khaleda Zia and elected president (2007–08, 2009-incumbent) of National Press Club
- Jehangir Khan Tareen, Pakistani politician of Pakistan Tehreek-e-Insaf, born in Comilla
- Mujibul Haque Mujib, a member of the Bangladesh National Parliament for the constituency of Comilla-11 and is the current Minister for Railways of Bangladesh
- Muhammad Hasanuzzaman (1900–1968), member of the Bengal Legislative Assembly
- Khan Bahadur Nawab Sir Kazi Golam Mohiuddin Faroqui (1891–1984), knight and politician
- Hasnat Abdullah (1998-), Politician and an Activist

== Social activists and philanthropists ==
- Nawab Faizunnesa, poet, pioneer in women's education, founder of Faizunnesa Girls’ School
- Ayman Sadiq Founder at ten minute school

== Educators and scholars ==
- Fazlul Halim Chowdhury, former vice-chancellor, Dhaka University
- Mohammad Kabir Hassan, noted financial scholar, University of New Orleans

== Writers ==
- Buddhadeb Bosu (1908–1974), Bangla poet, novelist, translator, editor and essayist
- Kazi Nazrul Islam, from West Bengal, but resided at Comilla for long
- Abdul Kadir (1906–1984), researcher, poet and editor

== Musicians ==
- Sachin Dev Burman (1906–1975), known as S.D. Burman, singer, composer and music director
- Rahul Dev Burman, known as R.D. Burman, son of S.D. Burman, composer and pioneer in Bollywood music direction
- Alauddin Khan
- Sudhin Das
- Ali Akbar Khan
- Gazi Mazharul Anwar
- Alaka Das, artist of classical music, principal of Sangeet Shikhharthee Sammilan
- Asif Akbar

== Actors ==
- Sabitri Chatterjee, Indian actress
- Ferdous Ahmed, Bangladeshi actor
- Chinmoy Roy, Bengali actor
- Bidya Sinha Saha Mim, Bangladeshi actress

== Scientists ==
- Harold John Finlay (1901–1951), New Zealand palaeontologist, was born in Comilla

== Sports ==
- Ranjit Saha (born 1964), ex-international footballer
- Rashid Ahmed (1916 – 1990s), footballer
- Khondkar Nasim Ahmed, (1912 – 1990s), footballer
- Sirajuddin, (1908 – unknown), footballer

== Religious scholars ==
- Abu Taher Misbah (born 1956), Islamic scholar, academic and textbook author

== See also ==
- List of Educational Institutions in Comilla
