= 1971 Dhaka University massacre =

Mass murder

- Part of the Bangladesh genocide
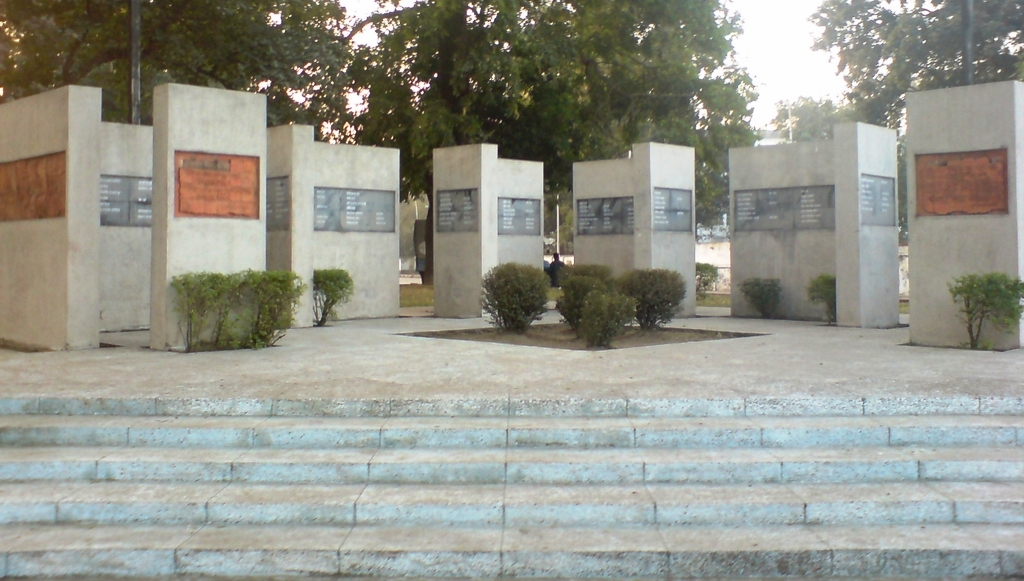
- Monument in honour of those killed at Dhaka University. Located at Mol Chottor DU.
- Location: University of Dhaka
- Date: 25 March 1971; 14 December 1971
- Target: Bengali intellectuals
- Attack type: Ethnic cleansing, mass murder
- Deaths: 200 Bengali intellectuals
- Perpetrators: Pakistan Army: Tikka Khan; Yahya Khan (Note: The Greater National Army Operation under the orders of Yahya Khan, not explicitly the Dacca University Massacre)

The 1971 Dhaka University massacre was the mass murder of students and teachers of the University of Dhaka in East Pakistan (present-day Bangladesh) by the Pakistan Army. On the night of 25–26 March 1971, under the orders of Yahya Khan, the Pakistan Army's Eastern Wing Commander Tikka Khan initiated an attack on the university campus as the initial phase of Operation Searchlight, aiming to destroy what was considered the heart of Bengali nationalism. Commemorated as one of the most chilling events in the Bangladesh Liberation War, The Pakistani forces shelled and attacked residential halls, including Jagannath Hall and Rokeya Hall, claimed as assembly points for students and teachers accused of being sympathetic to Bengali nationalist ideology, resulting in the deaths of civilians, professors, and students, with simultaneous reports of executions and arson. The estimated number of casualties varies significantly; while contemporary eyewitness accounts and subsequent analyses indicate hundreds were killed, some Pakistani officials' accounts claim that a few dozen people were killed. This attack was part of a broader Pakistani strategy to decapitate the Bengali intellectual leadership. This mass murder sparked widespread outrage among Bengalis, accelerated the Bengali guerrilla forces, and drew international condemnation.

== Background ==
After the Bengali Awami League had won a decisive majority (capturing 167 out of 313 seats) in the 1970 Pakistan parliamentary elections, the Bengali population expected a swift transfer of power to the Awami League based on the Six Point Programme. On 28 February 1971, Yahya Khan, then president of Pakistan, under the pressure of Zulfikar Ali Bhutto's Pakistan Peoples Party (PPP), postponed the national assembly meeting scheduled for March. The PPP had already started lobbying to weaken the stand of Sheikh Mujibur Rahman, and Bhutto was heard saying that he wanted the Bengalis to stay away. The Awami League, in response to the postponement, launched a program of non-cooperation (largely outlined in the 7 March Awami League rally) that was so successful that the authority of the Pakistani government became limited to military cantonments and official government institutions in East Pakistan.

Clashes between Bengalis and the Pakistan Army, and between the Bengalis and Biharis erupted and had now become commonplace. President Yahya Khan flew to Dhaka to hold talks with Mujibur Rahman, then leader of the Awami League, in March and was later joined by Bhutto, whose party had secured the second-largest share of seats (81 out of 300) in the general elections. Unwilling to transfer federal power from West Pakistan to East Pakistan as demanded by the Awami League (fearing a transfer of power would weaken or destroy the multiethnic Pakistani federation), or to lose face by backing down in the face of the non-cooperation movement, the West Pakistani generals, most of whom (including Commander-in-Chief Gul Hassan Khan) supported the PPP, finally decided on a military crackdown against the rebelling Bengalis in East Pakistan.

After the convening of the Pakistan National Assembly was postponed by Yahya Khan on 1 March, ethnic Biharis in East Pakistan, who supported West Pakistan, were targeted by the Bengali majority. In early March 1971, over 300 Biharis were killed in rioting by Bengali mobs in Chittagong. Following these series of incidents, the Government of Pakistan used the "Bihari massacre" to justify its military intervention in East Pakistan on 25 March, when it initiated Operation Searchlight.

== History ==
The Pakistan Army convoy that attacked Dhaka University on 25 March 1971 included the 18th Punjab Regiment, 22nd Frontier Force, and 32nd Punjab regiments along with several battalions. Armed with heavy weapons such as tanks, automatic rifles, rocket launchers, heavy mortars and light machine guns, they encircled Dhaka University from the east (unit 41), from the south (unit 88) and from the north (unit 26).

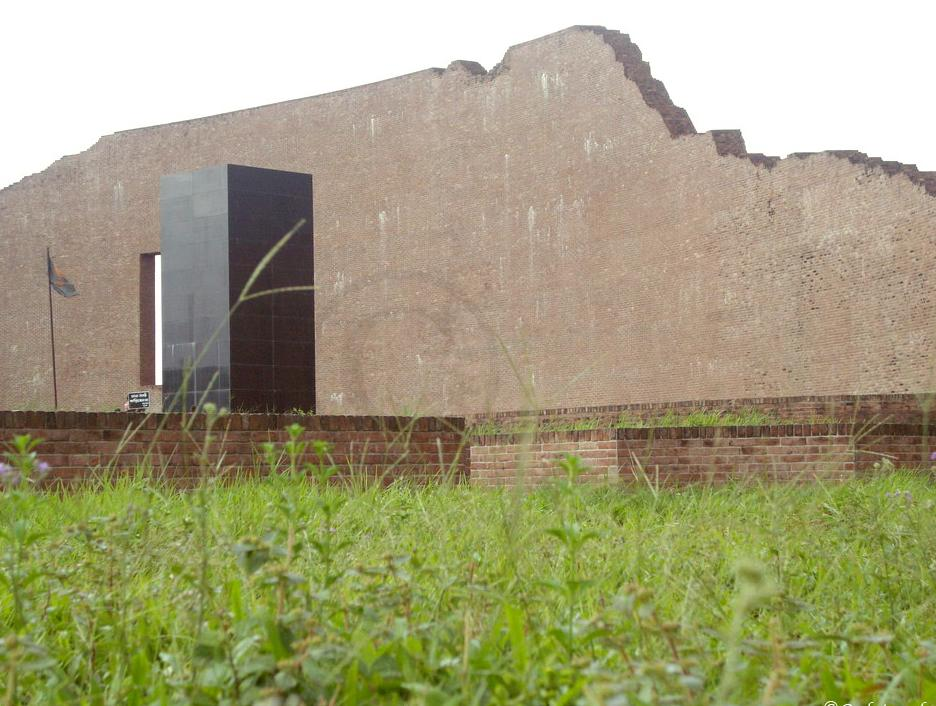
Martyred Intellectuals' Memorial at Rayerbazar, Dhaka.

At the beginning of Operation Searchlight 10 teachers of Dhaka University were killed.

Fajllur Rahman and his two relatives were killed at building 23 situated at Nilkhet. Rahman's wife escaped because she was not in the country. The Pakistan Army also attacked the house of Anwar Pasha and Rashidul Hassan. Both of them survived by hiding under beds, but were killed later in the war by the Al-Badr militia. Rafiqul Islam (Bangla Literature Department) was in building 24. Two wounded women with their children stayed in the entrance of the building for some time. When the army came, they found blood on the stairs and, surmising that other groups had done the massacre, left. This way Rafiqul escaped. Later he stated that there had been one East Pakistani professor at that building, who left home before 25 March. All other non-Bengali families did the same without informing others.

At Number 12 Fuller Road, the army called on Syed Ali Naqi, a professor at Dhaka University (sociology). They allowed him to go but killed Abdul Muktadir (geology), who was a resident of the same building. His body was found at Jahurul Huq Hall (then Iqbal Hall). He was buried at Paltan by his relatives. K. M. Munim (English literature), the house tutor of Salimullah Student Hall, was injured at Salimullah Hall. A. R. Khan Khadim and Sharafat Ali of the mathematics department were killed in Dhaka Hall. At Jagannath Hall, they attacked teachers' residence and harassed Mirja Huda (economics) and Mofijullah Kabir (history).

When Jagannath Hall, a student dormitory for minority Hindu students, was attacked, university staff quarters were also affected. The Army killed ex-provost and professor of philosophy Gobindra Chandra Dev with his Muslim adopted daughter's husband. They attacked and killed A.N.M. Manirujjaman, professor of statistics, along with his son and two relatives. Jyotirmoy Guhathakurta, the provost of Jagannath Hall, was severely injured by the army attack and died in the hospital later. Dormitory electrician Chitrabali and eyewitness Rajkumari Devi state that the doctors of Dhaka Medical College Hospital recognised Guhathakurta and buried him under a tree near Dhaka Medical College morgue.

Assistant house tutor Anudoipayon Bhattacharja was also killed at that dorm. This information was taken from the novel "Riffel Roti Awrat" (Rifle, Bread, Women) by Anwar Pasha, who was later killed in December. Pasha wrote this novel during the nine-month war period of 1971.

== Killing of students ==
The Non-cooperation movement was organised under the banner of the "Independent Bangladesh Students Movement Council" from Jahrul Hoque Hall of Dhaka University. The first target of Operation Searchlight was this student hall. By 25 March, all leaders of Chhatra League had left the hall. According to K.M. Munim, around 200 students were killed at this dorm.

After 12:00, the army entered Jagannath Hall and initially attacked the hall with mortars and began non-stop firing. They entered through the north and south gates and indiscriminately targeted students in each room, killing around 34 students at that time. Some students of Jagannath Hall were residents of Ramna Kali Bari. Only the name of one of these deceased students is known – Ramonimohon Bhattacharjee – although five or six were killed. Many guests of students who were at those dorms were also killed, including Helal of Bhairab College, Babul Paul of Bajitpur College, Baddruddojha of Jagannath Hall, Jibon Sarkar, Mostaq, Bacchu, and Amar of Netrokona.

== Killing of staff ==
The convoy that attacked Sergeant Jahurul Huq Hall initially attacked staff and killed a guard guarding the British Council building. They killed hall staff: Shirajul Huq, Ali Hossain, Shohorab Ali Gaji, and Abdul Majid at the university teachers' lounge. At Begum Rokeya Hall, Chottor Ahmed Ali, Abdul Khalec, Nomi, Md. Solaiman Khan, Md. Nurul Islam, Md Hafizuddin, Md. Chunnu Miya were killed with their families.

The convoy that attacked Shahid Minar and Bangla Academy also attacked Shahidullah Hall, associated teachers' houses, and the home of Madhushudhan De, owner of Madhur Canteen. At building 11, Md. Sadeq, a teacher at University Laboratory School, was killed. The army left around 50 dead bodies, including some police officers (escaped from Rajarbag Police line), Bengali EPR members guarding President House, and general people from Nilkhet Basti on the roof of university residential building-23.

Between 25 and 27 March, the Pakistan Army destroyed three temples: the Arts building-associated Gurdwara (Sikh), Ramna Kali Temple, and Ramna Shiva Temple (Hindu) opposite Shahid Minar. At least 85 people were intentionally murdered in Ramna Kali Temple before it was demolished. That night, staff of the philosophy department Khagen De, his son Motilal De, university staff Shushil Chandra De, Bodhiram, Dakkhuram, Vimroy, Moniram, Jaharlala Rajvar, Monvaran Roy, Plumber Rajvar, and Shankar Kuri were killed.

== Attack at girls' dormitory ==
Archer Blood, the then-consul general of the US at Dhaka, wrote in his book The Cruel Birth of Bangladesh, "Fire was started at Rokeya Hall (girls' dormitory) and, when the students tried to escape, the military started firing... On 10 November 1971, some armed criminals attacked Rokeya Hall and kept 30 girls confined for two hours. They also attacked Provost House". In 1971 there were two strong military establishments near Rokeya Hall, it was impossible to attack the university girls' hostel without their knowledge for two hours.

Excerpts from Genocide in Bangladesh by Kalyan Chaudhuri, pp 157–158:

...Some army officer raided Rokeya Hall on 7 October 1971. Accompanied by five soldiers, Major Aslam had first visited the hostel on 3 October and asked the superintendent to supply some girls who could sing and dance at a function to be held in Tejgaon Cantonment. The superintendent told him that most of the girls had left the hostel after the disturbances and only 40 students were residing but as a superintendent of a girls' hostel she should not allow them to go to the cantonment for this purpose. Dissatisfied, Major Aslam went away. Soon after the superintendent informed a higher army officer in the cantonment, over the telephone, of the Major's mission. However, on 7 October at about 8 pm. Major Aslam and his men raided the hostel. The soldiers broke open the doors, dragged the girls out and stripped them before raping and torturing them in front of the helpless superintendent. The entire thing was done so openly without any provocation, that even the Karachi-based newspaper, Dawn, had to publish the story, violating censorship by the military authorities. In seven days after liberation about 300 girls were recovered from different places around Dacca where they had been taken away and kept confined by the Pakistani army men. On 26 December altogether 55 emaciated and half-dead girls on the verge of mental derangement were recovered by the Red Cross with the help of the Mukti Bahini and the allied forces from various hideouts of the Pakistani army in Narayanganj, Dacca Cantonment and other small towns on the periphery of Dacca city.

== Academic activities at 1971 ==
Military Governor of East Pakistan Tikka Khan ordered department heads to join work from 21 April and the other teachers on 1 June, with classes to start from 2 August. All the dormitories were cleaned to remove any signs of destruction to present a good educational environment at the university to the international community. All exams were postponed due to the national crisis. As the forces of war increased until September, attendance in the classes also increased. As many students had joined the Mukti Bahini, they blasted hand grenades near the university and quickly entered classes. As a result, the Army failed to arrest anyone.

== Warning, arresting, and punishment of teachers ==
For known connections with pro-independence forces, Tikka Khan issued arrest orders against many teachers and arrested some of them. Among them there were Abul Khayer, Rafiqul Islam, K.A. M. Salauddin, Ahsanul Hoque, Giasuddin Ahmed, Jahrul Hoque, and M. Shahidullah. Military Governor of East Pakistan Tikka Khan officially warned Munir Chowdhury, Nilima Ibrahim, Shirajul Islam Chowdhury and Enamul Hoque. Abu Muhammah Habibullah was terminated. Abdur Razzak (political scientist and later National Professor of Bangladesh) was sentenced in absentia to 14 years for supporting the Bengali Independence movement.

== Vice-chancellor during 1971 ==
After March 1971, Dhaka University was without any vice-chancellor. In early March, the vice-chancellor, Justice Abu Sayed Chowdhury, was in Geneva at the "United Nations Humanitarian Conference". In the middle of March, he read news about the death of two students. He immediately wrote his resignation letter to the state's education secretary and fled to London, leaving the conference. There he worked for Bangladeshi independence. After the independence of Bangladesh, he became the country's second president.

The Pakistan Army fetched Syed Sajjad Hussain, the then VC of Rajshahi University, in their convoy. He was made VC of Dhaka University. University teachers who helped the Pakistan government included Hasan Zaman, Mohar Ali, A. K. M. Abdur Rahman, Abdul Bari, Mukbul Hossain, and Saifuddin Joarder. Collaborator Syed Sajjad Hussain, Hasan Zaman, and Mohar Ali were arrested after the independence of Bangladesh and exiled.

== Massacre on 14 December 1971 ==
In December, it became clear to the Pakistan government that it would lose the war. When Dhaka University reopened on 2 July 1971, teachers who collaborated with the Pakistani army gathered at Nawab Abdul Gani Road to prepare a list of intellectuals who supported the independence movement. Until then, the Pakistan Army secretly trained a group of Pakistan-supporting students. This group was named Al Badar. Later, Al-Badr members came out and selectively killed Bengali professors, doctors, engineers, and other intellectuals. Many of those killed were teachers at the university.

On 14 December 1971, over 200 Bengali intellectuals, including professors, journalists, doctors, artists, engineers, and writers, were abducted from their homes in Dhaka by the Al-Badr militia. This incident is known as the 1971 killing of Bengali intellectuals. Novelist Shahidullah Kaiser and playwright Munier Choudhury were among the victims. They were taken blindfolded to torture cells in Mirpur, Mohammadpur, Nakhalpara, Rajarbagh, and other locations in different parts of the city. Later they were executed en masse, most notably at Rayerbazar and Mirpur. In memory of the martyred intellectuals, 14 December is mourned in Bangladesh as Shaheed Buddhijibi Dibosh, or Day of the Martyred Intellectuals.
