= Samaddar (surname) =

- Pronunciation: Bengali pronunciation: [ʃɔmad̪d̪ar]
- Language: Bengali

Origin
- Meaning: Appreciation, Honour, Respectfully "equal or just"
- Region of origin: Bengal

Other names
- Variant form: Samadder

Samaddar (Bengali: সমাদ্দার), also spelled Samadder, is a Bengali Hindu surname, commonly found among the Bengalis of the Bengal region. They are usually Rarhi Brahmins of the Kashyapa gotra but some belong to any castes or sub-castes due to historic adaptation to various professions during their migration from Rarh regions to various new settlements. The common language spoken by them is Bengali.

Notable people with the surname include:

- Ranabir Samaddar, an Indian political scientist
- Rhik Samadder, a British journalist, writer, broadcaster and actor
- J.N. Samaddar, a noted archaeologist and historian
- Sukharanjan Samaddar, a university professor, educationalist and martyred freedom fighter
- Maddy Samaddar-Johnson, Canadian visual artist and architect
- Manik Lal Samaddar, a Bangladeshi civil servant
