= Mahbub Jamil =

Bangladeshi politician

- Born: Bangladesh
- Occupations: Businessman; Government official
- Known for: Chairman of Singer Bangladesh
- Office: Special assistant to the Chief Advisor of the caretaker government
- Term: 22 January 2008

Mahbub Jamil is a Bangladeshi businessman and former special assistant to the chief advisor of the caretaker government with the rank of a cabinet minister.

== Career ==
On 22 January 2008, Jamil was appointed special assistant to chief advisor of the caretaker government, Fakhruddin Ahmed, with the rank of a minister. He was placed in charge of the Ministry of Civil Aviation and Tourism, Ministry of Industry, and Ministry of Sports and Youth Affairs.

Jamil is the chairman of Singer Bangladesh. He had served as the president of the Metropolitan Chamber of Commerce and Industry, Dhaka and the Foreign Investors Chamber of Commerce and Industry.

On 25 February 2008, Jamil was appointed chairman of Biman Bangladesh Airlines.

On 28 July 2011, Jamil was appointed an adviser to the board of directors of Robi Axiata.

== See also ==
- Manik Lal Samaddar-Special Assistant/Advisor
