= Abdul Muktadir =

Bengali academic

Shahid Mohammad Abdul Muktadir
- মোহাম্মদ আবদুল মুক্তাদির
- Born: 19 February 1940; Silam, Assam, British India
- Died: 25 March 1971 (aged 31); Shahbag, East Pakistan, Pakistan
- Cause of death: Assassination
- Burial place: New Paltan, Dhaka, Bangladesh
- Other names: Mohammad Abdul Muqtadir
- Citizenship: British India (1940-1947); Pakistan (1947-1971)
- Education: Dhaka University; University of London
- Occupation: Lecturer
- Years active: 1964-1971
- Known for: Martyred Intellectual

Mohammad Abdul Muktadir was a Bengali geologist and academic who was killed in the 1971 Dhaka University massacre. He is considered a martyr in Bangladesh.

== Early life ==
Abdul Muktadir was the third child born into a Bengali Muslim family in Pashchimpara, Silam, Sylhet District on 19 February 1940. His mother was Begum Moshaheda Khanom. His father Abdul Jabbar was a renowned Moulvi and social activist, as well as the founder and headmaster of Silam PL Junior High School. Abdul Jabbar also used to voluntarily teach at the Jalalpur Alia Madrasa in Sylhet Sadar. Abdul Muktadir had two brothers and four sisters. His youngest brother was Abdul Qadir Jalaluddin.

Abdul Muktadir studied in Chakerbazar Government Primary School and then Silam PL Junior High School. In 1956 he graduated from Raja G. C. High School and in 1958 from Sylhet Government College. He completed a bachelor's and a master's in geology from Dhaka University in 1960 and 1962 respectively.

== Career ==
In July 1963, Muktadir was an assistant geologist with the East Pakistan Water and Power Development Authority. He then joined the faculty of Dhaka University on 19 October 1964 as a lecturer of geology. He earned his PhD in hydrology in the University of London. He received further training on hydrology as part of technical assistance from the British government. By 1968 at least, he was a senior lecturer.

== Death and legacy ==
Abdul Muktadir was killed by the Pakistan Army at the onset of Operation Searchlight during the Dhaka University massacre. He and his three-month pregnant wife lived in a ground floor flat at number 12 Fuller Road. During the night of 25 March 1971, they took shelter in the third floor flat of Syed Ali Naki. They could not sleep seeing fire outside the window and hearing screams and the sounds of the army vehicles. At sunrise on 26 March, he was reportedly getting ready for Fajr prayer when soldiers knocked at the door. Opening the door, he was grabbed by the soldiers and shot. His body was dragged and dumped at a mass grave in Rayerbazar with some of his other colleagues. After recovering his body, his relatives buried him near a mosque situated next to his father-in-law's house at 78/A Purana Paltan.

The University of Dhaka's Geology Department named their museum after him as Shahid Muktadir Museum.
