= Khitindra Chandra Baishya =

Bangladeshi open water swimmer

- ক্ষিতীন্দ্র চন্দ্র বৈশ্য
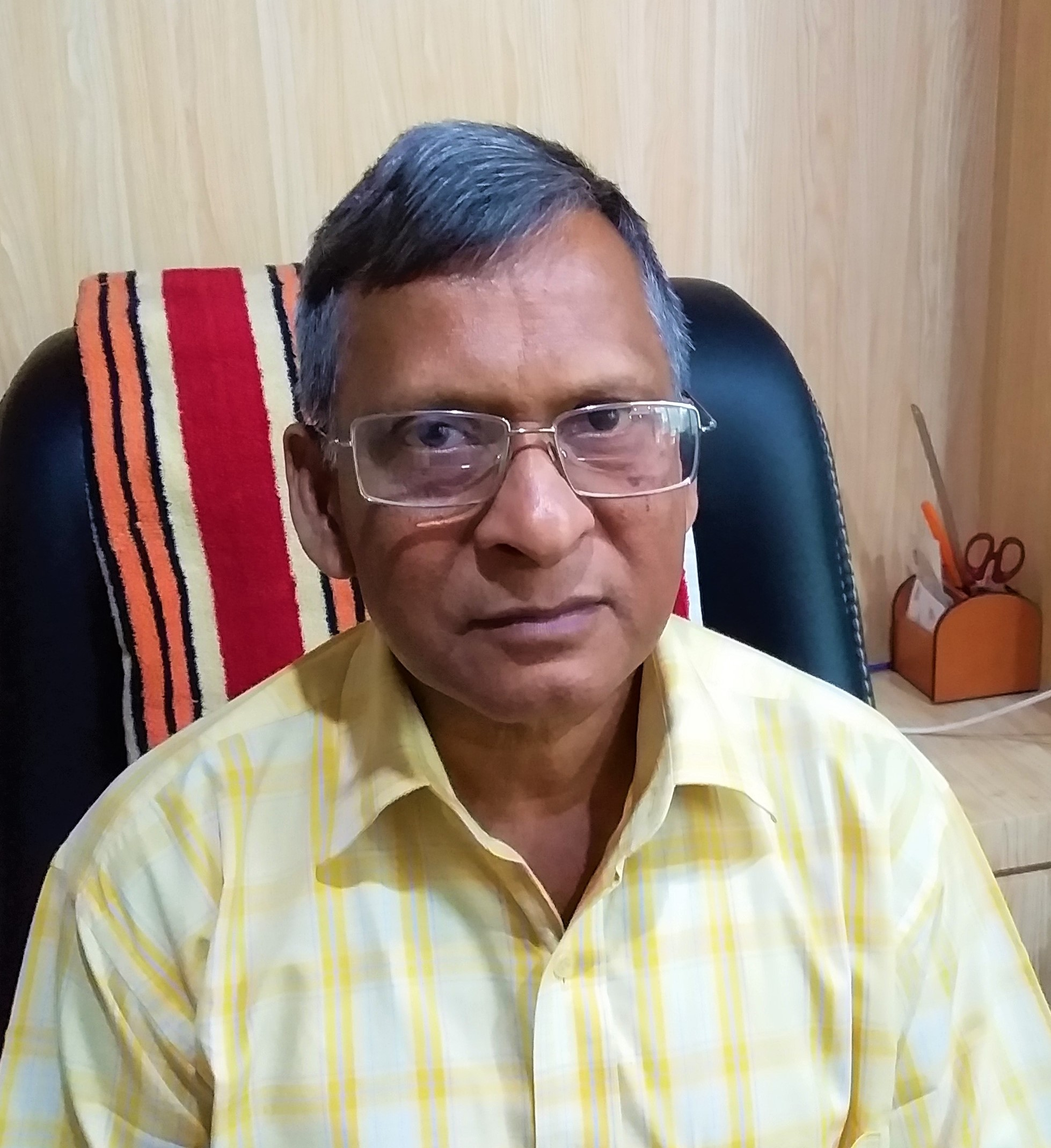
- Born: 23 May 1952 (age 74); Madan, Netrokona, East Pakistan
- Citizenship: Bangladeshi
- Education: Murari Chand College; Dhaka University
- Known for: Open water swimmer, freedom fighter
- Spouse: Anupama Baishya
- Children: 2
- Parents: Kshitish Chandra Baishya (father); Suparva Rani Baishya (mother)
- Awards: Ekushey Padak (2019)

Khitindra Chandra Baishya (born 23 May 1952) is a Bangladeshi open water swimmer and freedom fighter. In recognition of his contribution to the Bangladesh Liberation War, the government of Bangladesh awarded him the country's second highest civilian award Ekushey Padak in 2019. He was named one of the World's 50 Most Adventurous Open Water Men in 2019 by the World Open Water Swimming Association.

== Early life ==
Baishya was born on 23 May 1952 at Jahangirpur village of Madan Upazila in Netrokona District of the then East Pakistan to Kshitish Chandra Baishya and Suparva Rani Baishya. He completed his graduation from Murari Chand College and obtained his post graduate degree in physics from Dhaka University.

== Career ==
After completing his post-graduation in 1980, Baishya did a two years fellowship at Bangladesh Meteorological Department. In 1982, he joined the Civil Aviation Authority of Bangladesh (CAAB). He retired from service in 2011 and joined the same organization as ANS Consultant under Flight Safety and Regulations Division of CAAB.

=== Swimming ===
On 16 September 1974, Baishya completed a 93-hour and 11 minutes open water swim in the pond of Jagannath Hall at Dhaka University and again at the same pond for 108 hours and 5 minutes in 1976 which was organized by Dhaka University Central Students' Union. In 1980, he went to India and crossed 74 km course of Bhagirathi River under 12 hours and 28 minutes. In 2017, he crossed 146 km down the Kangsha River in 43 hours and 12 minutes. On 5 September 2018, he broke his previous record when he crossed 185 km in 60 hours and 55 minutes. He was named one of the World's 50 Most Adventurous Open Water Men in 2019 by the World Open Water Swimming Association.

== Personal life ==
Khitindra is married to Anupama Baishya in his personal life. The couple has a son and a daughter. He lives in Dhaka with his family.
