= Harinath Dey =

- হরিনাথ দে
- Harinath Dey
- Born: 1941 undivided India
- Died: 27 March 1971 (aged 29–30); Sutrapur, Dhaka, Bangladesh
- Cause of death: shot dead during Operation Searchlight
- Occupation: Research scientist
- Known for: lecturer in biochemistry at the University of Dhaka

Harinath Dey (Bengali: ড: হরিনাথ দে, 1941 – 27 March 1971) was a former lecturer of biochemistry at the University of Dhaka who was shot dead by the Pakistan armed forces on the Loharpool bridge in Sutrapur, Dhaka on the night of 27 March 1971.

== Early life and career ==
Dey was born in a Bengali Hindu family in 1941 in undivided India. After the Partition of India, his family continued to stay in East Pakistan. He started his career in research at the Science Laboratory in Dhaka. He worked for some time as a nutrition officer with the Mahatma Gandhi Memorial Medical Institute in India. He was associated in the capacity of a lecturer in biochemistry at the University of Dhaka. He also served at the Diabetic Association. In 1971, he was the principal scientific officer at the Science Laboratory.

== Death ==
Dey stayed in the Sutrapur locality of Dhaka. It was a neighborhood of old Dhaka where many well established persons of the society used to stay. On 25 March 1971, the Pakistan army launched Operation Searchlight, a violent crackdown on the city, resulting in large number of civilian casualties. In the afternoon of 27 March 1971, Dey was picked up from his Malakartola Lane residence by the Pakistan army and taken to the army camp at Sutrapur police station, along with ten other Bengali Hindu residents of the area. At 10 pm, he along with others were marched to the Loharpool bridge. He was shot dead and his body disposed of in the Dholai canal.

== See also ==
- Anudvaipayan Bhattacharya
