= Meghna Guhathakurta =

Bangladeshi writer

Meghna Guhathakurta is a retired professor of international relations of the University of Dhaka. She is the executive director of Research Initiatives, Bangladesh. She is a member of the executive committee of the Ain o Salish Kendra. She is a member of the advisory panel of the Interdisciplinary Institute of Human Security & Governance.

Guhathakurta's father, Jyotirmoy Guhathakurta, was killed in the Bangladesh Liberation War. She was a member of the National Human Rights Commission, Bangladesh. She is an advisor to the International Chittagong Hill Tracts Commission.

== Early life ==
Guhathakurta's father was Jyotirmoy Guhathakurta, professor of the University of Dhaka and provost of Jagannath Hall, and mother was Basanti Guhathakurta. His father was shot by Pakistan Army soldiers at the teachers dormitory of the University of Dhaka along with ANM Muniruzzaman on 25 March 1971 during Operation Searchlight. Jyotirmoy Guhathakurta died five days later at Dhaka Medical College Hospital but his body was later disappeared.

Guhathakurta studied at the Holy Cross Girls High School. After Guhathakurta finished her master's degree at the University of Dhaka, she completed her at the University of York.

== Career ==
Guhathakurta joined the University of Dhaka in 1984 in the Department of International Relations. In June 1996, she organization a petition calling for an investigation into the abduction of Kalpana Chakma.

Guhathakurta retired from the University of Dhaka in 2007. She led the Research Initiatives, Bangladesh when it worked with the United Nations High Commissioner for Refugees to carryout research on Rohingya refugees in Bangladesh in 2010.

Guhathakurta called for attention to the Attacks by Islamic extremists in Bangladesh on secular activists and called on the government to not view them as isolated attacks. She presented at the LSE-UC Berkeley Bangladesh Summit in 2018.

Guhathakurta is an associate editor of Sage's Action Research Journal. She is also an associate editor of the Journal of Social Studies published by the Centre for Social Studies.

== Bibliography ==
- Regional Cooperation and Globalisation: Bangladesh, South Asia and Beyond (2013)
- The Bangladesh Reader: History, Culture, Politics - The World Readers with Willem van Schendel (2013)
- Gendered Lives, Livelihood and Transformation: The Bangladesh Context (2017)
