= Niloy Das =

Bangladeshi guitarist (1961–2006)

- Born: 30 September 1961; Dhaka, East Pakistan
- Died: 2006 (aged 44–45)
- Genres: Western classical, flamenco, neo-classical, rock, blues, metal, jazz, modern Bangla music
- Occupations: Guitarist, singer, composer, music director, teacher
- Instruments: Guitar

Niloy Das (30 September 1961 – 2006), affectionately known as Niloy Da by his fans, was a Bangladeshi guitarist, singer, composer, music director, and guitar teacher. He is widely regarded as one of Bangladesh's foremost guitarists and was a pioneer in modern urban Bangla music, introducing Western genres such as classical, neo-classical, blues, metal, and jazz to the country's music scene.

== Early life ==
Niloy Das was born in Dhaka, East Pakistan (now Bangladesh), into a musically inclined family. His father, Sudhin Das, was a renowned researcher of Nazrul Sangeet, and his mother, Nilima Das, was a prominent singer. From an early age, Das showed a deep interest in music, particularly the guitar. Though his family specialized in classical Bengali music, Niloy developed a passion for Western music, drawing inspiration from legendary guitarists such as Ritchie Blackmore and Randy Rhoads.

In the early 1990s, his home in Kalabagan became a hub for local guitarists, providing a space for learning, collaboration, and experimentation.

== Musical career ==
Niloy Das's musical career spanned several genres, including Western classical, flamenco, neo-classical, rock, and modern Bangla music. He was celebrated for his technical proficiency on the guitar, earning the title of "guitarist's guitarist" among peers and students alike.

=== Bands and collaborations ===
Das formed two bands, Trilogy and The Gnomes. Though he performed occasionally with these bands, he rarely played live due to stage fright. He collaborated with prominent Bangladeshi musicians, including Happy Akhand, and maintained close ties with the local music community. His teaching and mentoring created a new generation of skilled guitarists in Dhaka.

=== Notable songs and compositions ===
- Koto Je Khujechhi Tomaye
- E Shohor
- Jokhoni Nibir Korey

These songs have been remixed and reperformed over the years, demonstrating their enduring popularity. In addition to his songs, he served as a music director for various projects, creating soundtracks and compositions that contributed to Bangladesh's music culture.

=== Influences ===
Niloy Das drew inspiration from both international and local musicians. International influences included Paco de Lucía, John McLaughlin, Al Di Meola, Yngwie Malmsteen, and Eric Johnson. He also admired classical composers such as Niccolò Paganini, Beethoven, Mozart, and Bach. Within Bangladesh, Das's work was informed by his father's research in Nazrul Sangeet and the music of contemporaries such as Ayub Bachchu and Kamal of Warfaze.

== Teaching and mentorship ==
Das was known for his unique and strict teaching style. He emphasized mastering the fundamentals before moving to advanced techniques, and he tailored lessons to each student's abilities. Many musicians recall that he encouraged exploration of different genres, from classical to Latin and African music, fostering both skill and creativity.

He was widely regarded as accessible, open-minded, and eager to share knowledge. His home and studio became a learning hub for aspiring guitarists, making him one of the most influential teachers in Dhaka's music scene.

== Legacy and commemorative works ==
In 2023, a book titled Niloy Da was published by Haque Faruk and Milu Aman to commemorate Das's life and work. The book collates tributes from contemporaries, peers, and students, including Foad Naser Babu, Ibrahim Ahmed Kamal, Babna Karim, Fuad Ibne Rabbi, Sayeed Karim, and Rezaul Rasel. It features interviews, photographs, album covers, and details about his discography, capturing the scope of his contribution to music.

Milu Aman, co-author and former student of Das, highlighted that the book aimed to introduce Niloy Das to new generations, describing him as an "unsung hero" of Bangladeshi music.

Events such as A Tribute to Niloy Das by Rangdhonu are organized to honor his contributions, reflecting his enduring influence on the Bangladeshi music industry.

== Death ==
Niloy Das died in 2006 at the age of 45 due to a heart attack. Despite his early death, his music, teaching, and influence continue to inspire musicians and music lovers in Bangladesh.

== See also ==
- List of Bangladeshi musicians
- Music of Bangladesh
- List of Bangladeshi Hindus
- Culture of Bangladesh
- Bangladeshi rock
