= Bimalendu Bikash Roy Chowdhury =

Bangladeshi politician

Bimalendu Bikash Roy Chowdhury was a Bangladeshi judge and former adviser of the Caretaker government of Bangladesh.

== Early life ==
Chowdhury was born on 1 November 1935 in Bakila, Hajiganj, Chandpur, East Bengal, British Raj.

== Career ==
In 1962 Chowdhury started his career as a lawyer in the Dhaka High Court. He was made an additional judge in 1985 of the High Court. He was promoted to the appellate division of the Supreme Court. He retired in 2000.

== Death ==
Chowdhury died on 11 April 2005 in a hospital in Kolkata. The Justice Bimalendu Bikash Roy Chowdhury National Memory Celebration Council was formed to honor his memory.
