= Manik Lal Ray =

Bangladeshi politician (1949–2019)

Manik Lal Ray (Manik Sir)
- মানিক লাল রায় (মানিক স্যার)
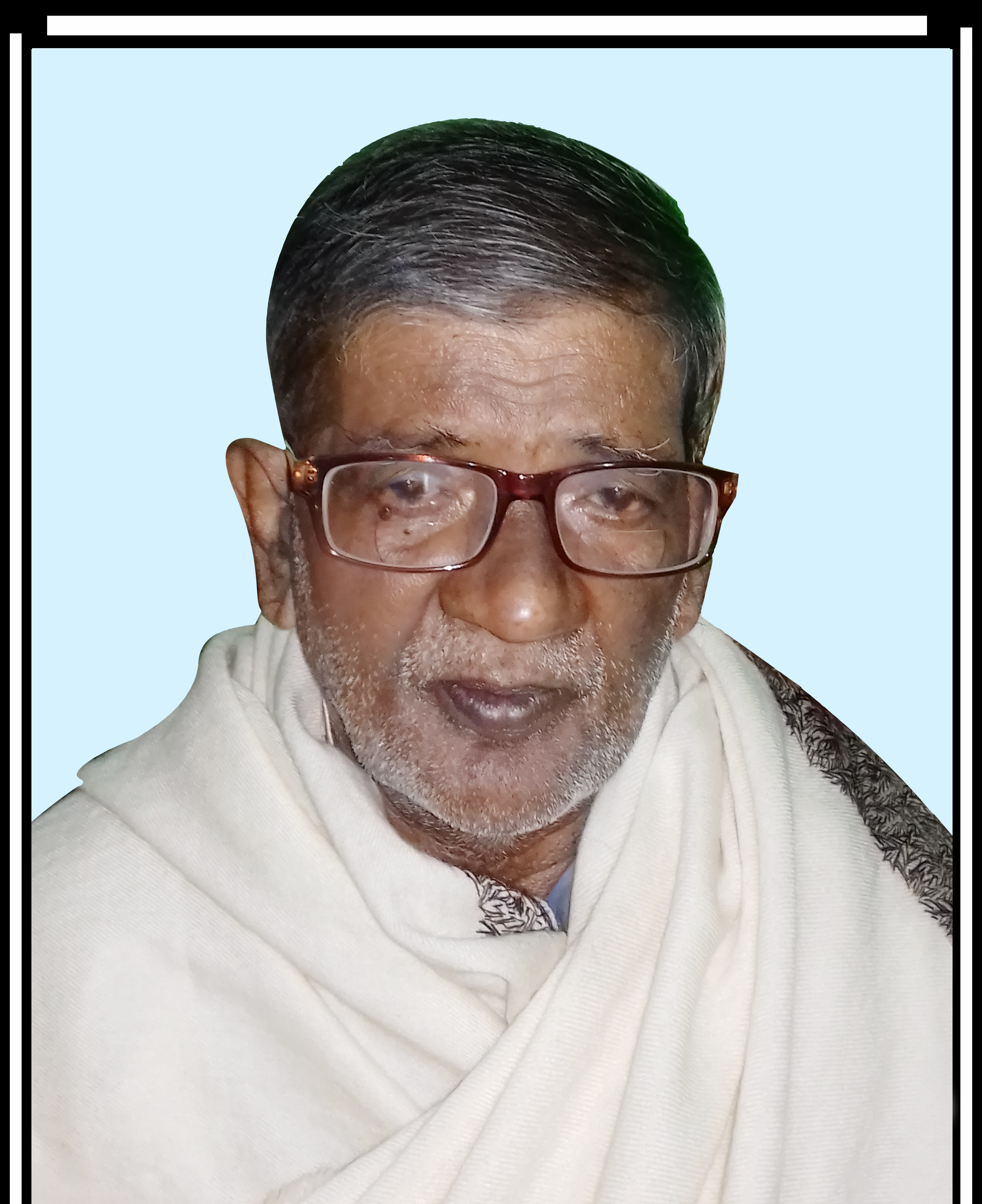
- Manik Lal Ray
- Born: 28 December 1949; Bharatpur, Jamalganj, Sunamganj, Sylhet Division
- Died: 26 July 2019 (aged 69)
- Parents: Gajendra Lal Ray (father); Sneholata Ray (mother)

Manik Lal Ray (Manik Sir) (born 28 December 1949 – 26 July 2019) was a Bangladeshi politician, teacher and freedom fighter. He was a successful leader of the Bhasan Pani Movement in 8th and 9th decade of 20th century.
