= Asit Dey =

Indian classical musician and teacher

- Born: Mymensingh
- Genre: Indian Classical Music
- Award: Sangeet Parampara Sammanana

Àsit Kumar Dey (born 1966) is a Bangladeshi classical musician.

== Early life ==
Dey was born in 1966 in Mymensingh. He began learning music in his early childhood under the guidance of his father, Pandit Mithun Dey, a distinguished classical vocalist of the Gwalior Gharana and a tabla player trained in the Farrukabad and Benaras Gharanas. His brother was classical musician Sanjib Dey.

As a teenager, he attended the Shri Ram Bharatiya Kala Kendra in Delhi, where he received vocal training from Srimati Shanti Sharma. He subsequently studied under Pandit Amarnath, the foremost disciple of Ustad Amir Khan.

== Musical career ==
Àsit Dey now teaches Hindustani classical vocal music at Chhayanaut and in the Department of Music at the University of Development Alternative (UODA) in Dhaka, where he is also the Department Coordinator.

In January 2023 Dey was awarded the Sangeet Parampara Sammanana from Music Alliance World Wide.
