= Urmila Srabonti Kar =

Bangladeshi television actress (born 1990)

- ঊর্মিলা শ্রাবন্তী কর
- Born: 18 July 1990 (age 36); Tangail, Bangladesh
- Occupations: Actress, Model
- Years active: 2009-present
- Known for: Lux Channel I Superstar(5th Runner-up, 2009)
- Spouse: Jaydeb Sinha Roy (m. 2015)

Urmila Srabonti Kar is a Bangladeshi television actress. She has appeared more than a dozen TV dramas.

== Early life ==
Urmila was born on 18 July 1990, to Ananta Kar, a military officer, and Tripty Kar.

== Career ==
In 2009, Urmila participated in Lux Channel I Superstar where she was placed 5th runner-up. This fame brought her chance to several TV dramas. She modeled for many TV commercials.

Her first TV drama was Jatil Prem in 2010. Among the other TV dramas in which she has appeared are Moneybag, Chirkut, Bou Kidnap, Election Caricature, Bhalobashar Etibritto, and Tumi More Bhuliaso.

She played the role of Jui in the 52-episode TV serial Shonar Shekol opposite actor Ziaul Faruq Apurba. They have also acted together in another TV serial called Sunflower, with veteran actress Tarin Jahan. From 2017, she is portraying a role in Bangla TV show Bou-Bibi-Begum.

== Personal life ==
Urmila married a bank officer named Jaydeb Sinha Roy. Their engagement took place on October 17, 2014, and later, they got married in April 2015. She lost her father in October 2015.

== Drama ==
=== One-Act dramas ===
- Jotil Prem (2010)
- Mehman & Redwan Roni
- Cholo Sobai Diet Kori
- Sonar Shikol
- Manibag
- Chirkut
- Bou Kidnap
- Bhalobashar Itibritto
- Makorshar Jal
- Tumi More Bhulaiso
- Circle
- Ekti Mimir Golpo
- Jogfol Ekei
- Somporker Nobayon
- Somporker Golpo
- Taile Sei Kothai Roilo
- Tobe Tai Hok (2017)

=== Serial dramas ===
- Momtaz Mahal
- Noorjahan
- Boeing 757
- Nagorik
- Idiots
- Shunno Somikoron
- Ochena Protibimbo
- Aghoton-Ghoton-Potiiyasi
- Behind the Trap (2014)
- Sunflower (2016)
- Aynabaji (2017)
- Vagabond
- Aastha
- Better Half
- Corporate
- Time
- Meghe Dhaka Shohor
- Ek Jhaak Mrito Jonaki
- Three Sisters
- Bou-Bibi-Begum (2017)

== Film ==
- From Bangladesh
