= Sumon Saha =

Bangladeshi cricketer (born 1984)

Personal information
- Born: 10 April 1984 (age 42); Sirajganj District, Bangladesh
- Batting: Right-handed
- Bowling: Right-arm fast-medium

Career statistics
Competition	First-class	List A
Matches	19	11
Runs scored	101	70
Batting average	6.73	10
100s/50s	0/0	0/0
Top score	34	27
Balls bowled	2,940	423
Wickets	48	14
Bowling average	32.22	24.14
5 wickets in innings	2	0
10 wickets in match	0	0
Best bowling	6/81	3/38
Catches/stumpings	8/–	8/–
- Source: ESPNcricinfo, 2 September 2017

Sumon Saha (born 10 April 1984) is a first-class cricketer from Bangladesh. Born in Sirajganj District, he is a right-arm fast-medium bowler and tail-end, right-handed batsman. He made his debut for Rajshahi Division in 2004/05 and played through the 2006/07 season. His best bowling, a haul of 6 for 81, came against Barisal Division, and he took another five-wicket haul against Dhaka Division.
