= Narayan Chandra =

Bangladeshi cricketer (born 1979)

Personal information
- Full name: Narayan Chandra Saha
- Born: 8 December 1979 (age 46); Narayanganj, Dhaka, Bangladesh
- Nickname: Tapu
- Batting: Right-handed
- Bowling: Right arm medium fast

Domestic team information
- Years: Team
- 2000/01: Barisal Division
- First-class debut: 22 November 2000 Barisal Division v Khulna Division
- Last First-class: 2 December 2000 Barisal Division v Dhaka Metropolis
- List A debut: 25 November 2000 Barisal Division v Khulna Division
- Last List A: 30 November 2000 Barisal Division v Sylhet Division

Career statistics
| Competition | FC | LA |
|---|---|---|
| Matches | 3 | 2 |
| Runs scored | 34 | 12 |
| Batting average | 6.80 | 6.00 |
| 100s/50s | –/– | –/– |
| Top score | 13 | 11 |
| Balls bowled | 24 | 90 |
| Wickets | 1 | 2 |
| Bowling average | 15.00 | 28.50 |
| 5 wickets in innings | – | – |
| 10 wickets in match | – | – |
| Best bowling | 1/15 | 2/30 |
| Catches/stumpings | –/– | –/1 |
- Source: Cricket Archive, 15 December 2016

Narayan Chandra Saha is a first-class and List A cricketer from Bangladesh. He was born on 8 December 1979 in Narayanganj, Dhaka and is a right-handed batsman and right arm medium-fast bowler. He is sometimes referred to on scoresheets by his nickname Tapu. He played for Barisal Division in 2000/01 but found success hard to come by in both forms of the game.
