= Timir Nandi =

Bangladesh singer

Timir Nandy
- তিমির নন্দী
- Born: Timir Nandy; 15 March 1957 (age 69); Rajbari, Bangladesh
- Occupations: Singer, writer, activist, anchor
- Years active: 1969–present
- Awards: Gold & Silver Medalist of East Pakistan Music Competition 1969, Swadhinata Academy 2012 & 2013, Zilla Shilpakala Academy 2012, Kushtia Zilla Proshashon 2012 & Dhaka Zilla Proshashon 2015, Gulshan Club 2014, Udichi Shilpi Gosthi 2015 & 2018, Bangladesh High Commission Kolkata 2012 & 2015, Bangladesh Embassy Kuwait 2011, Bangladesh Police Association 2014, Bangabandhu Sheikh Mujib Medical University 2015, Jahangirnagar University 2012 & 2018, Rishijo 1418 (Bangabda), Sammilito Sangsgkriti Jot (Kushtia) 1995, MEDHA (Kushtia) 2006, Grameen Phone 2006, Amra Surjyomukhi 2010, Transparency International Bangladesh 2013, Joyeeta 2016, Shanko Telefilm 2018, Bangla Ma 2016, Shubhojon 2019, Lions Clubs International Zilla 315 A1, Bangladesh 2021, Rotary Club of Dhaka Udayan Zilla 3281 Bangladesh & Economic Reporters Forum 2022, Kalim Sharafi award 2026 and many more

Timir Nandy (Bengali: তিমির নন্দী) is a Bangladeshi singer who mainly sings romantic songs and patriotic songs. He has lent his voice to popular songs such as "Ogo Chand Kothay Peyechho Eto Alo", " Tomare Legechhe Eto Je Bhalo", "Monobeena Te Roye Roye", " Jhoro Jhoro Baridhara Sondhay", "Chander Pane Cheye Cheye", " Badhon Khule Dilam".

== Career ==
Timir Nandy started his career in 1969 on Bangladesh Television and radio. In 1971, he participated in the Bangladesh Liberation War as a freedom fighter. After Independence, he was admitted to Dhaka music college. In 1972, he formed a cultural organisation named Rajani along with some of his friends in Dhaka. During this period, he started composing music, with some of his composed tunes penned by his friends from Rajani. In BTV's serial Shonkito Podojatra, he composed a song titled "Badhon khule dilam" which became immensely popular at the time.

In 1973, while studying in Dhaka, Nandy obtained a scholarship from the Soviet government to complete higher studies in Soviet Russia. He thus became the first ever Bangladeshi to complete higher musical studies in Europe. In the late 1970s, he returned to Bangladesh and took up music as a career. He earned a niche for himself through numerous hit songs in films, television, and radio.

In 2009, Nandy published an album after a long hiatus to commemorate the 40th anniversary of his career. In 2019, he published another album called Meghla Duchokh to celebrate his career's 50th anniversary. In 2020, he took the initiative to compose songs for the new generation's singers at the request of the regional director of Bangladesh Betar, Syed Mostafa Kamal. He has mainly worked on patriotic and modern songs. These songs have been penned by Rongu Shahabuddin, Md Rafiqul Hasan, Khokon Sirajul Islam, Ayet Hossain Ujjal and Salma Akter, and have been sung by vocalists Linu Billah, Mokhlesul Islam Nilu, Jinat Rehana, Tanveer Alam Sajeeb, Shahnaz Rahman Shikriti, Chhonda Chakraborty, Shorolipi, Sondipon, Ronti Das, Nishita Barua, Champa Banik, Shahina Haque, Himadri Biswas, Muhin, Priyanka Gope, Rajib, and Rebeka Sultana.

nandy joined St Francis Xavier's Greenherald International School as a music teacher in 1983, where he has been teaching since.

== Discography ==
=== Studio albums ===
Year	Title	Album details	Track listing
2019	Meghla Duchokh	Digital Release Date: 2019: Label: Agniveena—G-Series	1. "Du Pakhi Mile Bandhe"; 2. "Bhalobeshe Sobai Jodi"; 3. "Shudhu Mon Chhuye Hay"; 4. "Amar Meghla Duchokh"; 5. "Sundure Manay Bhalo"; 6. "Jokhon Dekechhi Kachhe"; 7. "Jiboner Banke Jodi"; 8. "Oi Duti Chokh"; 9. "O Nodi Tori Duti Chokh"; 10. "Kotobar Monke Bolechhi"; 11. "Tumi Chhile Ei Jibone"; 12. "Kedona Sedin Tumi"; 13. "Ei Hridoy Chhuye"; 14. "Tumi Chole Gechho"
