= Pradip Ranjan Chakrabarty =

Pradip Ranjan Chakrabarty is the Chairman of the Bangladesh Competition Commission. He is a former member of the Bangladesh Planning Commission.

== Early life ==
Chakrabarty was born in Natore District. His father was Kamini Kumar Chakraborty, martyred intellectual in the Bangladesh Liberation War. He did his bachelor's and master's in Zoology at the University of Dhaka.

== Career ==
In 1986, Chakrabarty joined the Bangladesh Civil Service.

On 20 December 1989, Chakrabarty joined the Pabna District Commissioner's Office. He had served in the National Disabled Development Foundation and the Bangladesh Tourism Board.

Chakrabarty was the additional secretary of Security Services Division under the Ministry of Home Affairs.

In May 2020, Chakrabarty was appointed a member of the Bangladesh Planning Commission. He replaced Shahin Ahmed Chowdhury who went on retirement. He then became a member of the Implementation Monitoring and Evaluation Division.

Chakrabarty led a team of the Ministry of Planning to visit Swiss School of Business and Management Geneva. He was appointed chairperson of Bangladesh Competition Commission in November 2022 with the rank of a government secretary. He had gone on post-retirement leave before his appointment. He recommended action against bottled water manufacturers for price fixing and gouging. He also worked to raise awareness about the commission.
