= Debendra Nath Ghosh =

Bangladeshi politician

- Born: 22 April 1890
- Died: 11 February 1999 (aged 108)
- Occupation: Politician

Debendra Nath Ghosh (22 April 1890 – 11 January 1999) was a Bangladeshi politician from Barisal. He was elected as a member of the East Bengal Legislative Assembly in 1954.

== Biography ==
Ghosh was born on 22 April 1890 in Barisal to Nibaron Ghosh and Rajlakshmi Ghosh in Barisal. He took part in the Language Movement. He was elected as a member of the East Bengal Legislative Assembly in 1954. He was imprisoned for a total of 27 years for protesting in the British and Pakistan periods and afterwards.

Ghosh died on 11 January 1999 at his own home in Barisal at the age of 108.
