= Ranesh Maitra =

Bangladeshi politician (1933–2022)

- Born: 4 October 1933; Rajshahi, Bengal Presidency, British India
- Died: 26 September 2022 (aged 88); Dhaka, Bangladesh
- Education: Govt. Edward College, Pabna
- Occupations: Journalist, columnist, politician
- Political party: Oikya National Awami Party
- Awards: Ekushey Padak (2018)

Ranesh Maitra (4 October 1933 – 26 September 2022) was a Bangladeshi journalist, columnist and politician. He was awarded country's second highest civilian award Ekushey Padak in 2018 by the government of Bangladesh for his contribution in journalism.

== Early life ==
Maitra was born on 4 October 1933 at his maternal house in Rajshahi of the then British India (now Bangladesh). His father, Ramesh Maitra, was an elementary school teacher. He got his matriculation certificate from Gopal Chandra Institution (GCI) in 1950. Later he completed his IA in 1955 and BA in 1959 from Govt. Edward College, Pabna.
