= Kajal Bandyopadhyay =

Bangladeshi writer

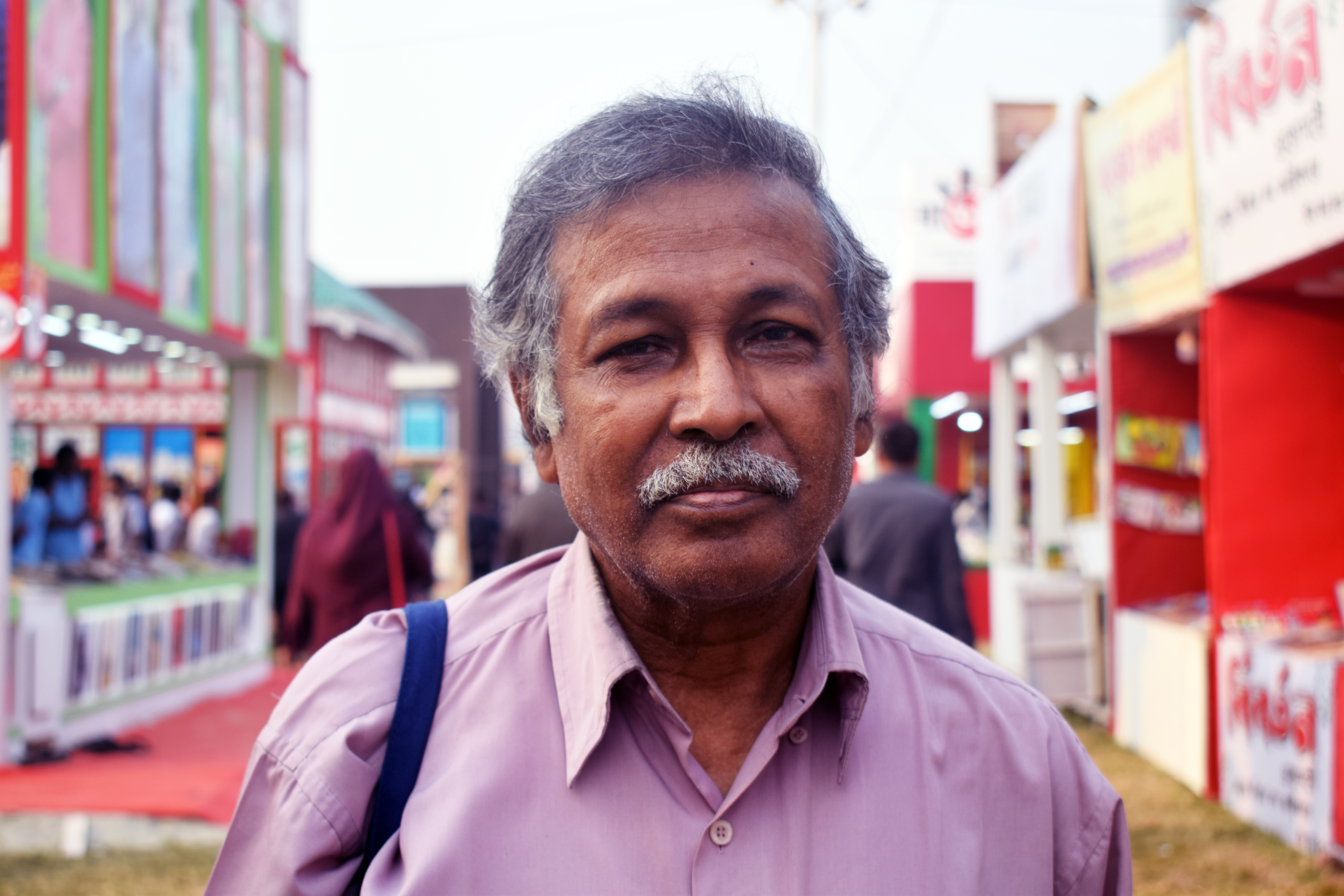
- Born: 13 February 1954 (age 72); Barisal, East Bengal, Dominion of Pakistan
- Occupations: Writer, professor, poet, translator
- Writing career
- Language: Bengali, English

Kajal Bandyopadhyay (born 13 February 1954) is a Bangladeshi poet, writer, and translator. He teaches English literature and previously worked as head of the dept. of English at the University of Dhaka.

== Education ==
Bandyopadhyay graduated from the University of Dhaka and completed his Ph.D. from Jadavpur University, Calcutta on Wole Soyinka.

== Literature ==
As a Marxist poet, Bandyopadhyay vividly portrays the "lives of toiling masses, particularly their problems, social conflicts, intrigues and inner complexes" with poignant poetic expressions. A presidium member of Bangladesh Hindu Buddhist Christian Unity Council, Bandyopadhyay is also a vehement activist against communal violence in Bangladesh. He champions secularism and non-communalism in Bangladesh; to protest attacks on minority communities in Bangladesh, he wanted to receive self-imprisonment in 2013.

Professor Bandyopadhyay's "essays speak of establishing a plural and classless society. They also unveil religious orthodoxy and fanaticism, and bring out the causes of cultural imperialism."

=== Interest on African literature ===
Kajal Banerjee has an especial fascination for African literature. He did his Ph.D. on the plays of Noble laureate African writer Wole Soyinka. Some books of his essays on African literature in English and Ibsen's plays have been received warmly.

== Selected publications ==
=== Books of Bengali poems ===
Name	Publishers	First Published
Hameshai Danober Trankorta-Besh		
Kangal Deerghokal (Seeker for a Long Time)		1985
Dagdha Dhoolikona (Burnt-out Speck)		1986
Prithibir Grihakone (In a Home of the Earth)		1988
Utthaner Mantra Nei (No Chant to Rise)		1989
Heshe Othe Ashrujol (Tears smiles)		1998
Unoswad Unouchcharon		
Phulo Unmatto Rangeen		
Tritiya Bishwer Kobita (Poems of the Third World)		1998
Protiprem, Proti-Akhyan	Ananya	2017

=== Essay ===
Name	Publishers	First Published
Swapna (Dream)		1985
Samrajyobad: Onya Unmochan (Imperialism: Other Exposures)	Bangla Academy	1986
Katha Kalantorer, Pragotir	Jatio Grantho Prokashon	2009
Pragati Sahitya Katipoy Tattwo Bichar	Nandyonik	2011
Rabindranath: Dharmobhabna	Moordhanyo	2012
Tension and Syntheses in Wole Soyinka's Plays	Dhaka University Press	5 August 2012
Female Power And Some Ibsen Plays	Moordhanyo	2015

=== Edited Bibliography ===
Name	Co-editor	Publishers	First Published
Rabindra Utsab		Jatio Rabindrasangeet Sammilon Parishad, Dhaka Mahanagar Chapter	February, 2012
Jago Amritopiyasee Chitto		Jatio Rabindrasangeet Sammilon Parishad, Dhaka Mahanagar Chapter	2009
Doohkher Timire		Registrar, University of Dhaka	October, 2006
Chhayachchhanna, He Africa		Shahitya Prokash, Dhaka & Naya Udyog, Kolkata	February, 1993
Bangladesher Buddhwibritti: Dharma Samprodayikotar Sangkat (Intellectual Practices in Bangladesh: A Crisis of Religious Communalism)	Prof. Salahuddin Ahmad, Syed Ameerul Islam	Jatio Grantho Prokashon	1998
Ekobingsho (A journal of poetry and poetics (28th -33rd Numbers))			
Africar Alo Songkolon (Collection of essays about African Literature and Culture)		Centre for Studies in African Cultures and Literatures, Dhaka, Bangladesh || February, 1990	
Nibondamala-2016, 2017, 2018 (Religion and Politics)		Centre for Advanced Research in the Humanities, University of Dhaka	
Professor Nurunnahar Begum Manabbidya Boktrita Songkolon (Collection of essays)		Centre for Advanced Research in the Humanities, University of Dhaka	2018

=== Translations ===
Name	Co-translator	Writer	Publishers	First published
Ovishap	Ujjal Bhattacharjee	Ousmane Sembène	Ankur Prokashoni	February, 2015
Ouponibeshikotar Mukhosh Unmochon		Aimé Césaire		2014
Tuccher Podaboli		Pablo Neruda	Shuddhaswar	February, 2014
Nazim Hikmeter Kobita (Nazim Hikmet’s Poetry)	Subhash Mukhopadhyay	Nazim Hikmet	Ankur Prokashoni	2013
Kabi Chatustoy Bangla Pratidhwani		Pablo Neruda	Ankur Prokashoni	2012
Anti-During (Socialism)		Friedrich Engels		2007
Pavlovio Manostatwer Prathomik Porichoy		Ushree Sengupta	Bijnyan Chetona Parishad	2005
Europer Chitrakala		Agnes Allen	Jatio Grantha Prokashan	1992
Punjibad and Paribesh Binash		Boris Gorizontov	Jatiyo Sahityo Prokashani	1988

=== Biography in Bengali ===
Name	Biography of	Publishers	First published
Ahmedur Rahaman	Ahmedur Rahaman	Bangla Academy	February, 1990
Roopkathar Raja	Hans Christian Andersen	Muktadhara	1986
