= Arun Nandi =

Bangladeshi swimmer

Freedom fighter Arun Nandi
- অরুণ নন্দী
- Born: November 26, 1941; Bagadi, Chandpur Sadar, Chandpur
- Died: November 16, 2008 (aged 66); Kolkata, West Bengal, India
- Occupation: Swimming
- Years active: 1960-2008
- Awards: National Sports Awards

Arun Nandi (November 16, 1941 – November 26, 2008) was a renowned Bangladeshi swimmer. In 1971, he set a record by swimming continuously for 90 hours and 5 minutes in College Square, Kolkata, to raise public awareness and funds for the freedom fighters of Bangladesh. He was also a recipient of National Sports Award-1966.

== Early life ==
Arun Nandi was born on November 16, 1941, into the Nandi family of Bagadi village in the Sadar Upazila of Chandpur district, Bangladesh. Although his family eventually settled in Kolkata, Arun Nandi refused to leave his homeland. In his personal life, he remained a lifelong bachelor.

== Career ==
In 1971, Arun Nandi gained international fame by swimming continuously for 90 hours and 5 minutes at College Square in Kolkata and created a record. He had undertaken this venture with the aim of creating awareness all over the world and collecting funds on behalf of the freedom fighters in the Bangladesh Liberation War. The prize money he received from the event was wholly given away for the welfare of the freedom fighters. Many dignitaries watched the swimming event, including Satyajit Ray, Uttam Kumar, and Brojen Das. Singer Manna Dey sang on the stage to help raise awareness among the Indian people for the struggle of Bangladesh's liberation. In 1962 Arun Nandi won the champion in the swimming competition at Chaumuhani College. In 1965, he stood second in the long-distance swim arranged by the English Channel Crossing Committee between Narayanganj and Chandpur. In the 1965-66 season, he was the second in 22-kilometer swim from Daudkandi to Narayanganj. In 1974, he became the champion by swimming 110 kilometers across the Padma, Meghna, and Buriganga rivers. He formed the Arun Nandi Swimming Club with the aim of rearing young swimmers in Chandpur. From 2003 to 2006, he was the Vice President of the Bangladesh Swimming Federation and became its member from 2006 to 2007.

== Awards ==
In 1966, Arun Nandi was honored with the National Sports Award. Throughout his career as both an athlete and an organizer, he received numerous national and international recognitions, including the Bangladesh Sports Journalists Association (BSJA) award. In his honor, the Arun Nandi Swimming Pool was established in Chandpur.

== Death ==
In his later years, Arun Nandi lived a solitary life in a small room on the second floor of the hockey stadium in Dhaka. He suffered from kidney disease and eventually traveled to Kolkata for treatment. On November 26, 2008, he died while undergoing treatment at a hospital in Kolkata.
