= Jyotirmoy Guhathakurta =

Bengali educator and activist

- জ্যোতির্ময় গুহঠাকুরতা
- Born: 10 July 1920; Mymensingh, Bengal, British India
- Died: 30 March 1971 (aged 50); Shahbag, Dhaka, Bangladesh
- Education: University of Dhaka; King's College London
- Occupation: University Academic
- Known for: Martyred Intellectual
- Parents: Sri. Kumud Chandra Guhathakurta (father); Smt. Sumati Guhathakurta (mother)

Jyotirmoy Guhathakurta (10 July 1920 – 30 March 1971) was a Bengali educator and humanist of the former East Pakistan, now Bangladesh. He was one of the Bengali intellectuals killed by the Pakistan Army during the 1971 Dhaka University massacre on the night of 25 March 1971.

== Background and education ==
Guhathakurta was born to Sri. Kumud Chandra Guhathakurta and Smt. Sumati on 10 July 1920 in Mymensingh town. Both of his parents were Bengali Hindu school teachers. They were originally from Barisal. After matriculating in 1936 from Mymensingh Zilla School, he joined Presidency College in Kolkata to study Intermediate Science. But he could not attend his final exams there because of typhoid. He came back to Mymensingh and took admission in Ananda Mohan College from where he passed Intermediate Arts in 1939. Guhathakurta then got himself admitted in the Department of English of Dhaka University and graduated with honors in 1942, and was first in the class. His excellent academic results earned him the Pope Memorial Gold Medal in Literature. He completed his masters the following year in the same institute.

== Career ==
Guhathakurta taught in a number of colleges from 1944 to 1949, such as AM College in Mymensingh, Gurudayal College in Kishoreganj, and Jagannath College in Dhaka. In 1949 he joined the University of Dhaka as a lecturer in English. In 1963, he went to King's College, London University, on a British Council scholarship to do doctoral work on "Classical Myths in the Plays of Swinburne, Bridges, Sturges, Moore, and Eliot". In 1967, Guhathakurta returned to Dhaka University and was promoted to Reader, a position he held until his death.

== Assassination ==
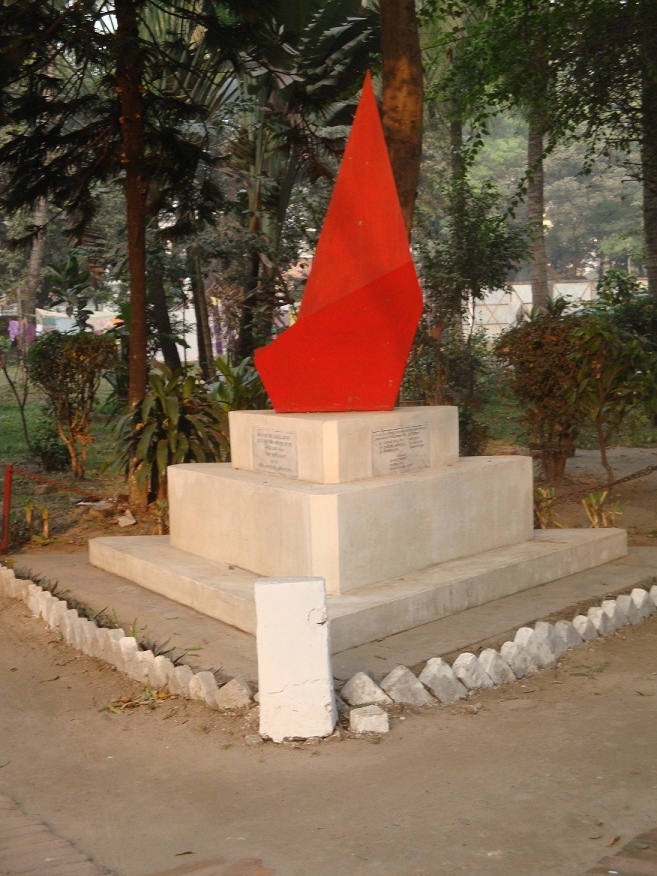
This monument to the intellectuals killed by the Pakistani soldiers in the area of the Central Shahid Minar on the night of 25–26 March 1971, lists Guhathakurata's name.

After midnight 25 March 1971, Professor Jotirmoy Guhathakurta was shot in the dark by the Pakistani Army just outside the University building where he lived while at the same time another professor A.N.M. Maniruzzaman and three members of Maniruzzaman's family was shot in the landing of the stairwell of the same building. On 27 March, he was taken to the hospital which was almost deserted except for the wounded, with a handful of doctors to attend. After two days with hardly a regular medical attendant, he died due to severe loss of blood.

== Personal life ==
Guhathakurta's daughter, Meghna Guhathakurta, is a professor of the University of Dhaka.

== See also ==
- Guhathakurta family of Barisal

== Bibliography ==
- 1973 Classical Myths in the plays of Swinburne, Bridges, Sturge Moore, and Eliot, based on his doctoral thesis – Posthumous Publication, Dhaka University.
- 1977 "Bangla Academy students' English to Bengali dictionary" compiled by Nur Muhammad; reviewed by Zillur Rahman Siddiqui, Jotirmoy Guha Thakurtha, Serajul Islam Chowdhury, Bangla Academy.
- 2011 (reprint) Jyotirmoy Guhathakurta Smarak Grantha (Commemorative Volume of Jyotirmoy Guhathakurta) edited by Sardar Fazlul Karim and Rangalal Sen, (contains a compilation of published articles in various journals and newspapers), Bangla Academy, Dhaka.
