= Rangalal Sen =

- Born: 24 September 1933; Moulvibazar, Bengal Presidency, British India
- Died: 10 February 2014 (aged 80); Chittagong, Bangladesh
- Education: University of Dhaka; University of Sussex

Rangalal Sen (24 September 1933 – 10 February 2014) was a Bangladesh academician and writer. In 2011, he was inducted as the National Professor of Bangladesh.

== Early life ==
Sen was born into a Bengali Hindu family in the village of Troilokkhobijoy, Kamalpur in South Sylhet.

== Education ==
Sen completed his bachelor's and master's from the Department of Sociology at the University of Dhaka in 1962 and 1963 respectively. He then earned his PhD from Sussex University in England in 1977.

== Career ==
In 1967 Sen joined Bangladesh University of Engineering and Technology as a lecturer. A year later, he joined the Department of Sociology of the University of Dhaka. He retired from the faculty position in 1993.

Sen had written a total of 23 books in English and Bengali.
