= Sukharanjan Samaddar =

- Born: 15 January 1938; Eluhar, Banaripara, Barisal, East Bengal, British Raj
- Died: 14 April 1971 (aged 33); Rajshahi University, Rajshahi, Bangladesh
- Citizenship: Bangladesh
- Occupations: Freedom fighter, scholar, educationalist

Sukharanjan Samaddar (15 January 1938 – 14 April 1971) was a university professor, educationalist, and martyred freedom fighter of the Bangladesh Liberation War. Not to be confused with Sukha Ranjan Samadder, Professor at the department of Environmental Science and Engineering at Indian Institute of Technology (ISM), Dhanbad, India.

== Early life ==
Samaddar was born on 15 January 1938 in Eluhar, Banaripara, Barisal, East Bengal, British Raj. He graduated from Baishhari High School in 1952 and from Barisal BM College in 1954. He finished his undergraduate from Calcutta University in 1957 and graduate studies from Dhaka University in 1958 in Sanskrit.

== Career ==
Samaddar joined Gopalganj College in 1958 as Professor of Sanskrit. In 1959 he was appointed lecturer of Sanskrit in Rajshahi University.

== Liberation War ==
Samaddar's wife later stated that on 13 April 1971, the Pakistan Army entered Rajshahi University. An injured soldier of East Pakistan Rifles came to their house at midnight. Samaddar provided first aid to the soldier, who left before daybreak. The next day, the Pakistan Army came to their house looking for the injured soldier. The Pakistan Army was accompanied by Motiur Rahman, a Bihari and the head of the psychology department, and Ahmed Muhammad Patel, a geography teacher at the university. The army interrogated Samaddar and was about to leave when Motiur informed them that Samaddar was a Hindu. At that point, the army took Samaddar into custody. Patel told Samaddar's daughter that he was with Vice-Chancellor Syed Sajjad Hussain and that there was nothing to worry about. The whereabouts of Samaddar remained unknown until after the end of the Bangladesh Liberation war. His body was discovered after the war and it was learned that he had been executed on the night of his abduction. He was reburied in front of the Rajshahi University library on 25 February 1972.
