= Sudhin Das =

Bangladeshi musician (1930-2017)

- সুধীন দাশ
- Born: 30 April 1930; Comilla, Bengal Presidency, British India
- Died: 27 June 2017 (aged 87); Dhaka, Bangladesh
- Occupations: Playback singer, composer, music director
- Years active: 1945–2017
- Children: Niloy Das, Suparna Das
- Parents: Nishi Kanta Das (father); Hemprabha Das (mother)
- Relatives: Surendra Narayan Das (brother)
- Awards: Ekushey Padak

Sudhin Das (pronounced [ʃudʱn daʃ]; 30 April 1930 – 27 June 2017) was a Bangladeshi Nazrul Sangeet musician. He was awarded Ekushey Padak by the Government of Bangladesh.

== Early life and career ==
Das was born in Bagichagaon, Comilla, to Nishi Kanta Das and Hemprabha Das on 30 April 1930. Das started learning music at Sangeet Shikhharthee Sammilan in Comilla, established by his elder brother Suren Das in 1942. Das was enlisted in Radio Pakistan when he was a college student in 1948.

In 1985, after finishing his learning, Das moved to Dhaka and joined as a member of the Nazrul Sangeet Promanikoron Board at Nazrul Institute. He taught Nazrul Sangeet to the young artists of the institute.

== Personal life ==
Das was married to Neelima Das. She is also an artist of Nazrul Sangeet. She also received Nazrul Padak and Channel i Lifetime Achievement award. His niece Alaka Das is an artist of Classical and Nazrul Sangeet. His son Niloy Das, was a prominent guitarist, music director, and singer.

== Awards ==
- Shaheed Altaf Mahmood Memorial Gold Medal (1985)
- Ekushey Padak (1988)
- Meril Prothom Alo Awards for Lifetime Achievement (2010)
- Nazrul Padak (1999)
- Churulia Nazrul Academy's Nazrul Award
- Nasiruddin Gold Medal
- Zebunnessa- Mahbubullah Trust Gold Medal
