= Anudvaipayan Bhattacharya =

- অনুদ্বৈপায়ন ভট্টাচার্য
- Anudvaipayan Bhattacharya
- Born: 31 January 1941; Nabiganj, Assam, British India
- Died: 25 March 1971 (aged 30); Shahbag, East Pakistan, Pakistan
- Occupation: Scholar
- Known for: Martyred Intellectual
- Parent: Digendra Chandra Bhattacharya

Anudvaipayan Bhattacharya (Bengali: অনুদ্বৈপায়ন ভট্টাচার্য; 31 January 1941 – 25 March 1971) was a lecturer of the Department of Applied Physics at the University of Dhaka who was killed by the Pakistan Army on 25 March 1971.

== Early life ==
Bhattacharya was born in a Bengali Hindu Brahmin family on 31 January 1941 in the village of Jantari in erstwhile greater Sylhet district of British India. His birthplace is now under Nabiganj Upazila in Habiganj District of Sylhet Division in Bangladesh. His father Digendra Chandra Bhattacharya was a school teacher. After the Partition of India and inclusion of Sylhet in East Pakistan, the Bhattacharya family stayed at their familial village.

As a child Bhattacharya attended the J.K. High School in Nabiganj. In 1961, he passed the Matriculation examination. In 1963, he passed I.Sc. from Sylhet MC College. He complete B.Sc. in physics in 1966 and Masters in applied physics in 1967 from Dhaka University.

== Career ==
In 1968, Bhattacharya joined Dhaka University as a lecturer in the newly opened Department of Applied Physics. In 1969, he started working as the house tutor of Jagannath Hall of Dhaka university. He obtained a scholarship for higher studies under the Colombo plan and was scheduled to leave for London on 26 March 1971.

== Assassination ==
On the night of 25 March 1971, the Pakistan Army launched Operation Searchlight. In Dhaka, they attacked the Jagannath Hall of Dhaka University. Bhattacharya was shot in front of the Jagannath Hall building and buried in a mass grave.

== Legacy ==
In 1995, the Government of Bangladesh issued a commemorative stamp in his name on 14 December, Martyred Intellectuals Day. The library of Jagannath Hall has been renamed to Shahid Anudvaipayan Pathagar.
