= Jagannath Hall =

Building in Dhaka, Bangladesh

- জগন্নাথ হল
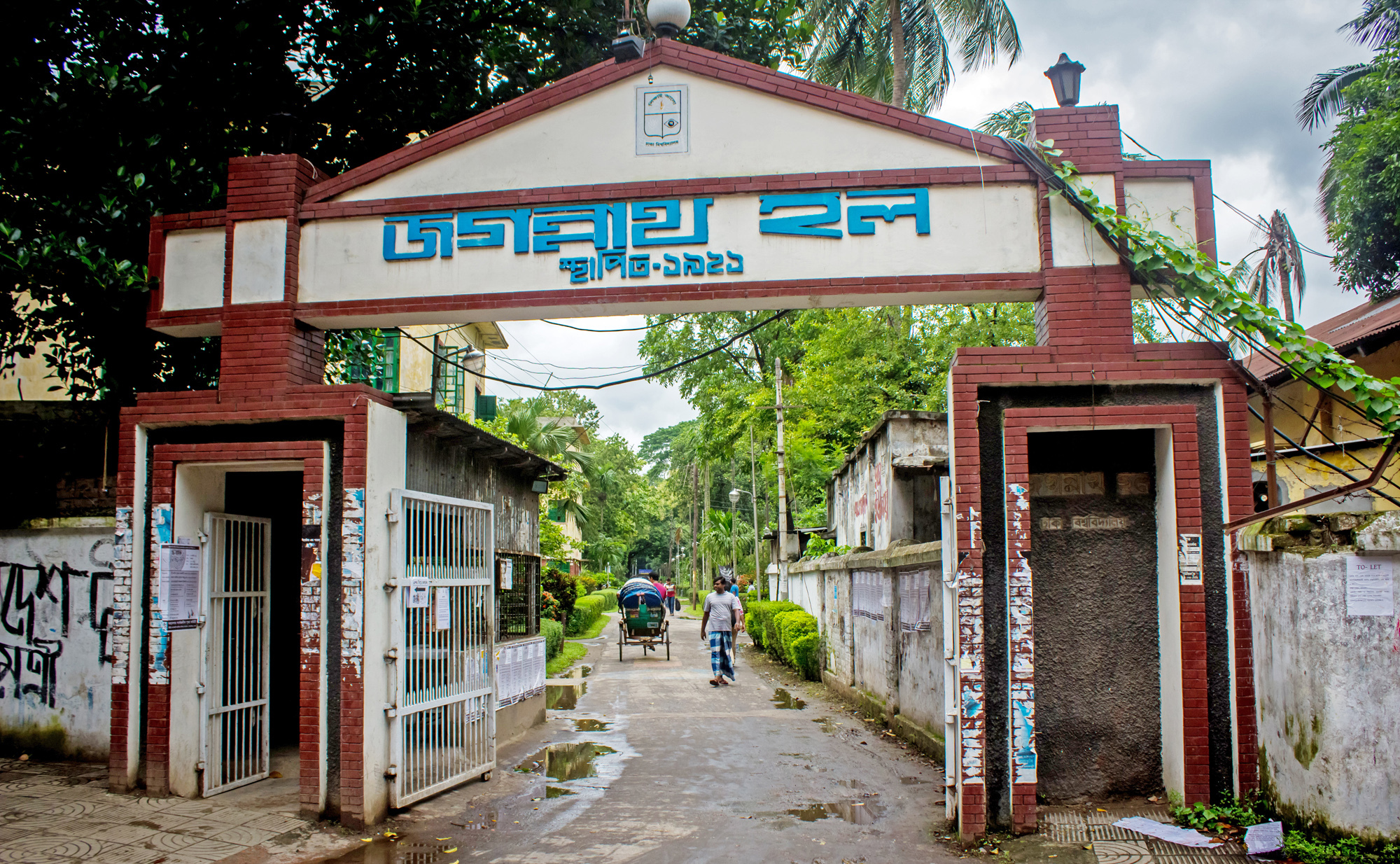
- Gate of the Jagannath Hall
- Established: 1921
- Affiliations: University of Dhaka
- Provost: Debashis Pal
- Students: 2492
- Location: Dhaka, Bangladesh; 23.729088°N 90.394242°E
- Website: Official site

Jagannath Hall of the Dhaka University is a residence hall for students from religious minorities, including Hindus, Buddhists, and Christians. It is one of the three original residence halls that date from the founding of the university in 1921, and is modelled on the colleges of the University of Oxford, a complex of buildings including residences, meeting rooms, dining rooms, a prayer hall, gardens, and sporting facilities. Of the approximately 2,000 students of the hall, half live in the residences, and half are non-residential students affiliated with the hall. Several professors at the university hold the positions of house tutors and provost at the hall.

In 1971, the Pakistan Army killed over 300 students at this Hindu-majority dormitory.

== Structures ==
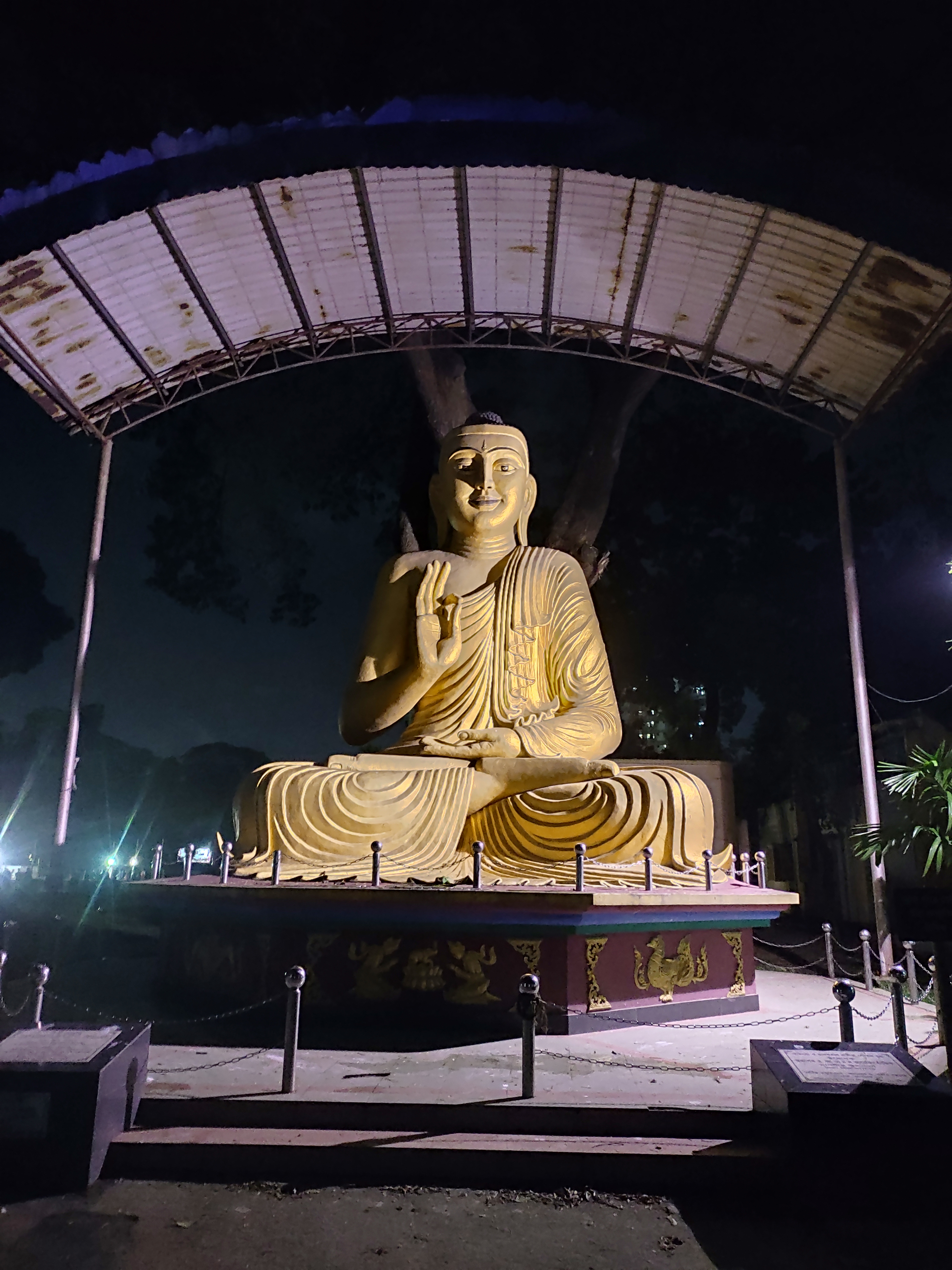
Statue of the Buddha, Jagannath Hall

The hall includes four residential buildings:

- Govinda Chandra Dev Building
- Rabindra Bhavan
- Sontosh Chandra Bhattacharya Bhavan (New Building)
- October Memorial Building (October Smriti Bhaban)
- Jyotirmoy Guhathakurta Building

== History ==
=== Establishment ===
Kisorilal Roy Chowdhury, the Zamindar of Baliati in Saturia, Manikganj, who had previously established Jagannath College named after his father Jagannath Saha, also established this hall of the University of Dhaka.

The University of Dhaka was established in 1921 as a merger of the two institutes of higher learning that existed in the city at that time: Dhaka College, a government institution, and Jagannath College, which was privately funded. With the Jagannath College Act of the Indian Legislative Council (Act No XVI of 1920), that college was renamed as Jagannath Intermediate College, and the second- and third-year students (303 in all) were transferred to the University of Dhaka the following year, along with many teachers and equipment such as library books. Two residence halls at Dhaka University were then named after the contributing colleges: Jagannath Hall and Dhaka Hall (since renamed Dr Muhammad Shahidullah Hall).

The first provost of this hall was Professor Naresh Chandra Sengupta, who served from 1921 to 1924. Other famous provosts include philosopher Govinda Chandra Dev (who served from 1957 to 1970) who was murdered by the occupying Pakistan Army in 1971, along with the then-current provost Professor Jyotirmoy Guhathakurta.

=== Assembly House ===
On 20 June 1947, 141 East Bengali legislators from the Bengal Legislative Assembly voted on the partition of Bengal, with 107 supporting joining Pakistan's Constituent Assembly if Bengal were partitioned. The Sylhet region in Assam voted in a referendum to join East Bengal. After the creation of the Dominion of Pakistan, those 141 legislators, in addition to legislators from Sylhet of the Assam Legislative Assembly, formed the East Bengal Legislative Assembly. The Muslim League's Sir Khawaja Nazimuddin became the first chief minister. He was succeeded by Nurul Amin in 1948. The assembly was housed in Jagannath Hall.

=== Mass murder during Operation Searchlight ===
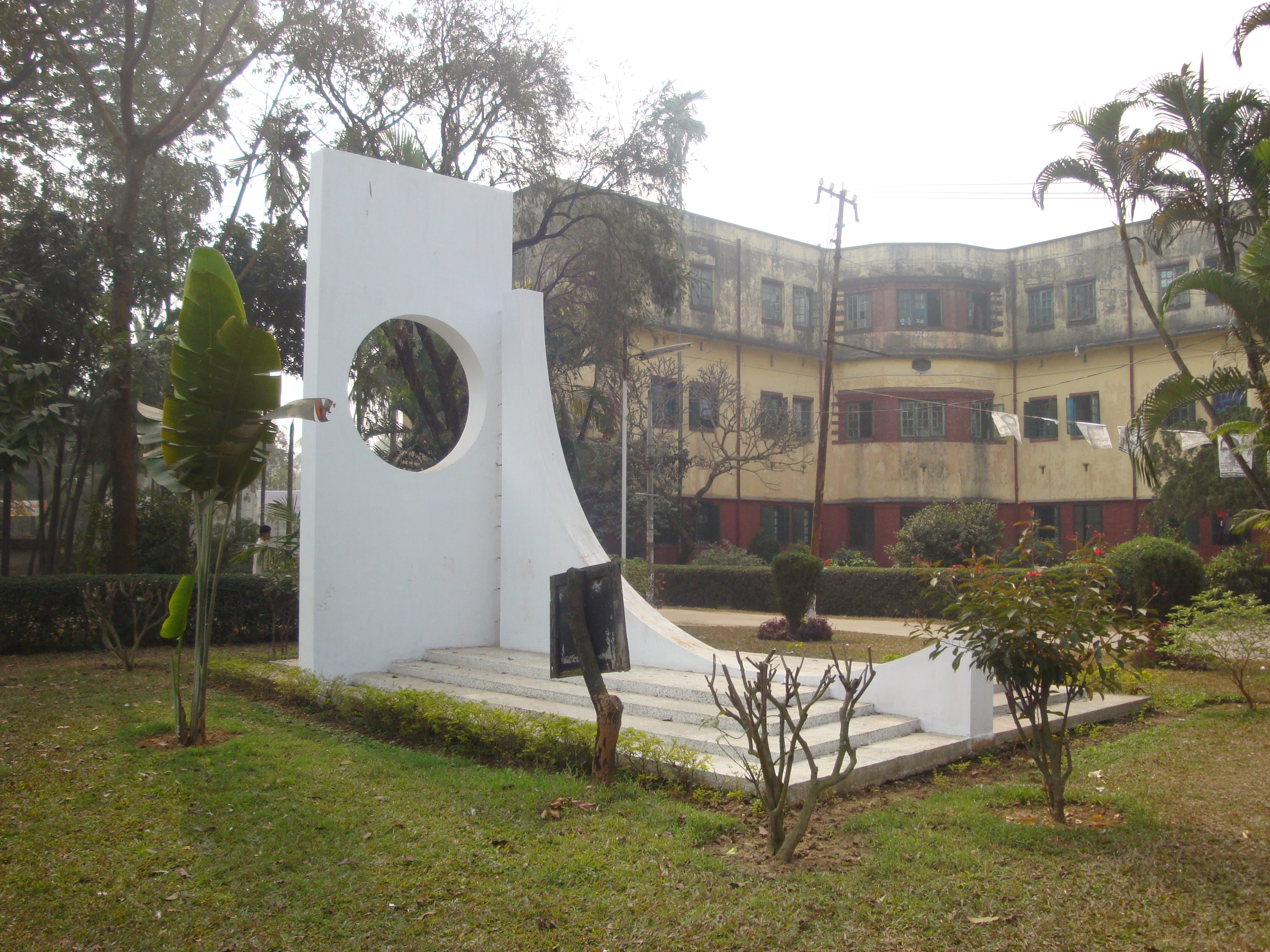
Grave of the 1971 martyrs, in front of Jagannath Hall

After midnight on 25 March 1971, the campaign of genocide (Operation Searchlight) against intellectuals by the Pakistan Army took place in the Dhaka University area. Jagannath Hall could not be defended against this action, and many residential students and employees were killed on that night. Professor Jyotirmoy Guhathakurta and Professor Govinda Chandra Dev, the former and current provosts, were also murdered at their apartments on Secretariat Road. Over 300 students were killed after the Pakistan Army encircled the hall, burned it, and indiscriminately fired at it.

=== 1985 Jagannath Hall tragedy ===
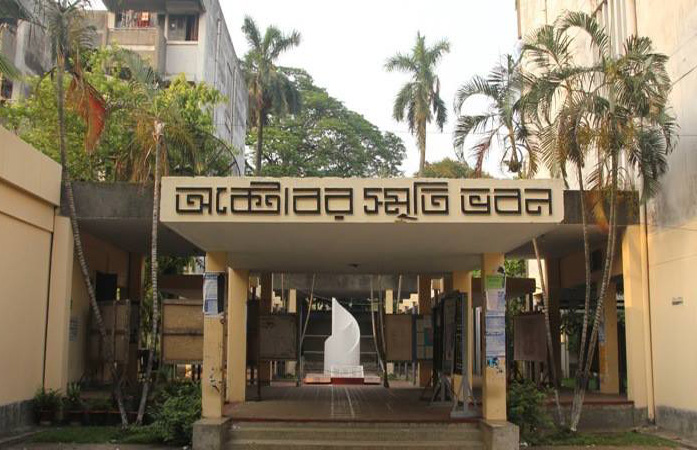
October Smriti Bhawan (October Memorial Building)

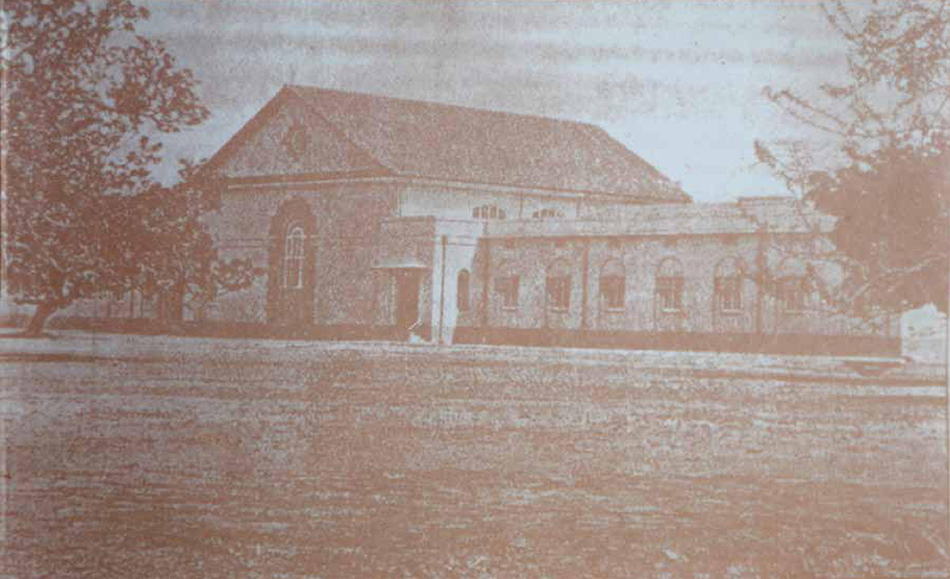
Jagannath Hall assembly building

On 15 October 1985, a tragic accident occurred when the roof of the ancient assembly building of Jagannath Hall collapsed. It killed 39 people, including students, employees, and guests. Since then, the day has been observed as a day of mourning for the university. In 1988, the building was reconstructed as a residential building, and named October Memorial Building.
