= Manik Lal Samaddar =

Bangladeshi politician

Manik Lal Samaddar is a Bangladeshi civil servant and former special assistant to the Chief Advisor of the Caretaker government with the rank of a cabinet minister responsible for two ministries.

== History ==
Samaddar was a former secretary of the Government of Bangladesh. On 22 January 2008, Jamil was appointed Special Assistant to Chief Advisor of the Caretaker government, Fakhruddin Ahmed, with the rank of a Minister. He was placed in charge of the Ministry of Fisheries and Livestock and the Ministry of Information and Communication Technology.
