= Comilla Victoria Government College =

College in Bangladesh

Coordinates: 23.4598°N 91.1823°E

- কুমিল্লা ভিক্টোরিয়া সরকারি কলেজ
- Former name: Comilla Victoria College
- Type: Public
- Established: November 24, 1899; 126 years ago
- Founder: Roy Bahadur Ananda Chandra Roy
- Affiliations: Cumilla Shikkhaboard
- Academic affiliations: Bangladesh National University
- Principal: Md. Abul Basher Bhuiya
- Academic staff: 125
- Administrative staff: 220 (approximately)
- Students: 29,900 (approximately)
- Location: Comilla, Bangladesh
- Campus: 29 acres (12 ha); Urban
- Language: Bangla
- Colours: Blue Shirt); Black (Pant)
- Website: cvgc.edu.bd

Comilla Victoria Government College (Bengali: কুমিল্লা ভিক্টোরিয়া সরকারি কলেজ), mostly known as Comilla Victoria College, is a public college in Comilla, Bangladesh. It is one of the oldest and prestigious colleges in Comilla as well as in the Chittagong Division. The higher secondary branch of the college is located in Kandirpar area of the comilla city and the degree and honours branch of the college is located in Dharmapur area of Comilla. The college was named after Queen Victoria, the Queen of United Kingdom and the British Raj at the time of its founding.

== History ==
The college was established in 1899 by Roy Bahadur Ananda Chandra Roy. Sattendranath Boshu was the first principal of the college and remained in that position until he died

Fazlul Karim became the first Muslim instructor at the college in 1937. He was later appointed vice principal in 1958 and remained in that position until his retirement in 1972, at which point the institution was converted into a government college.

== Academics ==
Currently, the college accommodates 15,000 students and employs 147 teaching staff, of whom 36 are women.

== Housing ==
Comilla Victoria College has a total of five dormitories, comprising four for male students and one for female students. Approximately 1,000 students currently reside in these dormitories.

== Faculty ==
Comilla Victoria Government College currently comprises four departments under its academic structure. These departments are organised within four faculties: Faculty of Arts, Business Administration, Social Science, and Science.

Faculty Name	Categories	Seat number in the graduate class	Total number of seats
Faculty of Arts	Bangla; English; Arabic and Islamic Studies; History; Islamic History and Culture; Philosophy		
Faculty of Business Administration	Accounting; Finance and Banking; Management; Marketing		( MBA)500
Faculty of Social Science	Political Science; Economics; Social Work		
Faculty of Science	Physics; Chemistry; Mathematics; Statistics; Zoology; Botany		

=== Cultural ===
The educational institution hosts thirteen cultural organisations that actively participate in both national and local cultural domains. These organisations include the Bangladesh National Cadet Corps (BNCC) of the Army and Air Force, the Red Crescent, Victoria College Bitorko Parishad, Victoria College Theater, Rover Scouts, Campus Barta, the Blood Donor Organisation, Nongar, the Botany Society, the Career Club, and the Science Club. Members of these groups undertake various cultural and social activities within the college.

== Notable people ==
=== Faculty ===
- Ashab Uddin Ahmad, educator, writer, and politician, taught English.
- Nalini Kanta Bhattasali, historian, archaeologist, numismatist, epigraphist and antiquarian, taught history.
- Meher Kabir, educator, taught chemistry in 1949.
- Akhtar Hameed Khan, development practitioner and social scientist, was a principal of the college in the 1950s.
- Ali Nawaz, educator, taught Bengali.
- Laila Nur, professor and Bengali language movement activist, was the first woman on the faculty, joining in 1957.
- Ghulam Rahman, chairman of the Anti-Corruption Commission (2009–2013), earned a Higher Secondary Certificate (HSC) in 1963 and taught economics.
- Ajoy Roy, physics professor and secular humanist, began his career by teaching from 1957 to 1959.
- Dinesh Chandra Sen, writer and folklorist, was headmaster in 1891.

=== Alumni ===
- Abu Sayeed M Ahmed, architect, graduated in 1976.
- Muzaffar Ahmed, professor of economics and left-wing politician, earned an HSC.
- Novera Ahmed, sculptor, enrolled after partition.
- Asif Akbar, singer, captained the cricket team.
- ATM Alamgir, lawyer and politician, was vice president of the Chhatra League at the college (1966–1968).
- Mobashwer Ali, writer, earned an HSC in 1948.
- Sharafat Ali, lecturer in mathematics, earned an Intermediate of Science in 1962.
- Gazi Mazharul Anwar, lyricist and filmmaker, earned an intermediate in the science group.
- Ali Ashraf, member of parliament (MP), joined the Bangladesh Chhatra League while he was a student.
- Md Abdul Aziz, cabinet secretary (2008–2011), earned an HSC in 1970.
- A. K. M. Bahauddin, MP, was a student in 1970.
- Khwaja Nizamuddin Bhuyan, Bir Uttom, earned an HSC in 1966.
- Dilip Biswas, film director, was a student.
- Sudhindra Bose, professor of political science, was a student (1901–1903).
- S. D. Burman, music director of Indian Bollywood film industry.
- Abu Osman Chowdhury, lieutenant colonel, earned a BA.
- Fazlul Halim Chowdhury, chemist and vice chancellor of Dhaka University (1976–1983), was a student.
- Jharna Dhara Chowdhury, social worker, earned a Higher Secondary Certificate.
- Motaher Hussain Chowdhury, educator and writer, earned a BA.
- Nabi Chowdhury, footballer, captained the Pakistan national football team and East Pakistan football team.
- Siddique Ahmed Chowdhury, justice of the high court, was a student.
- Shib Narayan Das, one of the creators of the first national flag, was a student.
- Sudhin Das, Nazrul Geeti musician, earned an intermediate in 1948.
- Kamal Dasgupta, music director, composer, and singer, earned a BCom.
- Dhirendranath Datta, lawyer and politician, earned an FA in 1906.
- Pran Gopal Datta, MP and vice chancellor of Bangabandhu Sheikh Mujib Medical University (2009–2015), was a student.
- Narendra Nath Dutta, Indian physician and industrialist, earned an FA in 1908.
- Lucky Enam, actress, was a student.
- Sudhamoy Ghosh, biochemist and pharmacologist, earned an Intermediate of Science.
- Ajit Kumar Guha, educationist, earned a BA in 1934.
- Imaul Haq, poet, earned a BA in 1935.
- Yussuf Abdullah Harun, MP, earned an I.Com.
- Akbar Hossain, Bir Protik, earned an IA in 1959.
- Syed Mahmud Hossain, chief justice of Bangladesh (2018–2021), earned an HSC in 1974.
- Md. Nurul Huda, MP, was general secretary of the Chhatra League at the college.
- Muhammad Enamul Huq, brigadier general and MP, earned an HSC in science in 1964.
- ABM Husain, archaeologist and scholar of Islamic history and art, earned an intermediate in 1951.
- Rafiqul Islam, Bir Uttom, earned an intermediate in 1959.
- Rafiqul Islam, campaigner for International Mother Language Day, earned an I.Com in 1969.
- Syed Amirul Islam, justice of the high court, was a student.
- Mustafa Kamal, finance minister of Bangladesh (2019–2024), earned an HSC.
- Bimal Kar, footballer, member of the Shadhin Bangla football team.
- AHM Mofazzal Karim, poet, civil servant, and diplomat, was a student.
- Abdul Karim, member of National Assembly of Pakistan, was a student in 1923.
- Abdul Khaleque, police officer and home secretary (1971-1973), earned an intermediate.
- Abdus Suttar Khan, chemist, was a student.
- Abed Hossain Khan, musician and music director, was a student 1946–1948.
- Gaziul Hasan Khan, journalist and diplomat, was in the East Pakistan Students' Union.
- Masud Ali Khan, actor, matriculated.
- Mobarak Hossain Khan, musicologist and director of the Bangladesh Shilpakala Academy, was a student.
- Suleman Khan, physician, earned an I.Sc in 1958.
- Abdul Matin Khasru, lawyer and MP, earned an intermediate in 1968.
- Mohammad Hossain Khasru, classical musician, earned a BA in 1923.
- Shahjahan Kibria, children's writer, earned an HSC in 1960.
- Jyotirindra Bodhipriya Larma, president of Parbatya Chattagram Jana Samhati Samiti, graduated in 1963.
- Apel Mahmood, singer, was a student.
- A. K. M. Abdul Awal Majumder, civil servant, earned an HSC in 1975.
- Ali Imam Majumder, adviser in the Yunus ministry, was a student.
- Ramendu Majumdar, actor, stage director, and theatre producer, studied at the higher secondary level.
- Adwaita Mallabarman, an Indian Bengali writer. He is mostly known for his novel Titash Ekti Nadir Naam
- Abul Kalam Mazumdar, MP, was a student.
- Rafiqul Islam Miah, barrister and government minister, was a student.
- Bidya Sinha Saha Mim, actress, earned an HSC.
- Abdul Awal Mintoo, businessman, earned an HSC in 1966 in the science group.
- Abdul Momin, Bir Protik, was a higher secondary level student.
- Shirshendu Mukhopadhyay, author, was a student.
- Mujibul Haque Mujib, railways minister of Bangladesh (2012–2018), earned a B.Com.
- Salauddin Mumtaz, officer posthumously awarded Bir Uttom, studied at the higher secondary level.
- Khan Sarwar Murshid, educationist and diplomat, earned an IA.
- A. B. M. Musa, journalist and editor, was a student.
- Waliullah Patwari, educator, earned an Intermediate of Science in 1926.
- Kazi Zahirul Qayyum, elected to the National Assembly of Pakistan in 1970, was a student (1938–1939).
- Mijanur Rahman, vice-chancellor of Jagannath University (2013–2021), earned an HSC in 1975.
- Abdur Rauf, naval officer accused in Agartala Conspiracy Case, was active in student politics (1953–1954).
- Arfanul Haque Rifat, mayor of Comilla (2022–2023), earned a BA.
- Atindra Mohan Roy, Anushilan Samiti revolutionary, was jailed before he finished his studies.
- Badal Roy, footballer, was a student.
- A. K. M. Sadeq, judge and chief election commissioner (1995–1996), was a student (1948–1949).
- Syed Safiullah, chemistry professor, earned an Intermediate of Science in 1962.
- Hanif Sanket, television host and comedian, was a student.
- Prabodh Chandra Sen, poet and historian, earned an IA in 1920.
- A. S. M. Shahjahan, police officer and adviser to the caretaker government (2001), earned an HSC in 1958.
- Abdus Shakur, writer and musicologist, earned an intermediate in 1960.
- A. B. Siddique, MP, earned an intermediate in 1943.
- Sachindra Lal Singh, chief minister of Tripura state (1963–1971), attended.
- Alfaz Uddin, MP, earned a BSc in 1951.

== Gallery ==
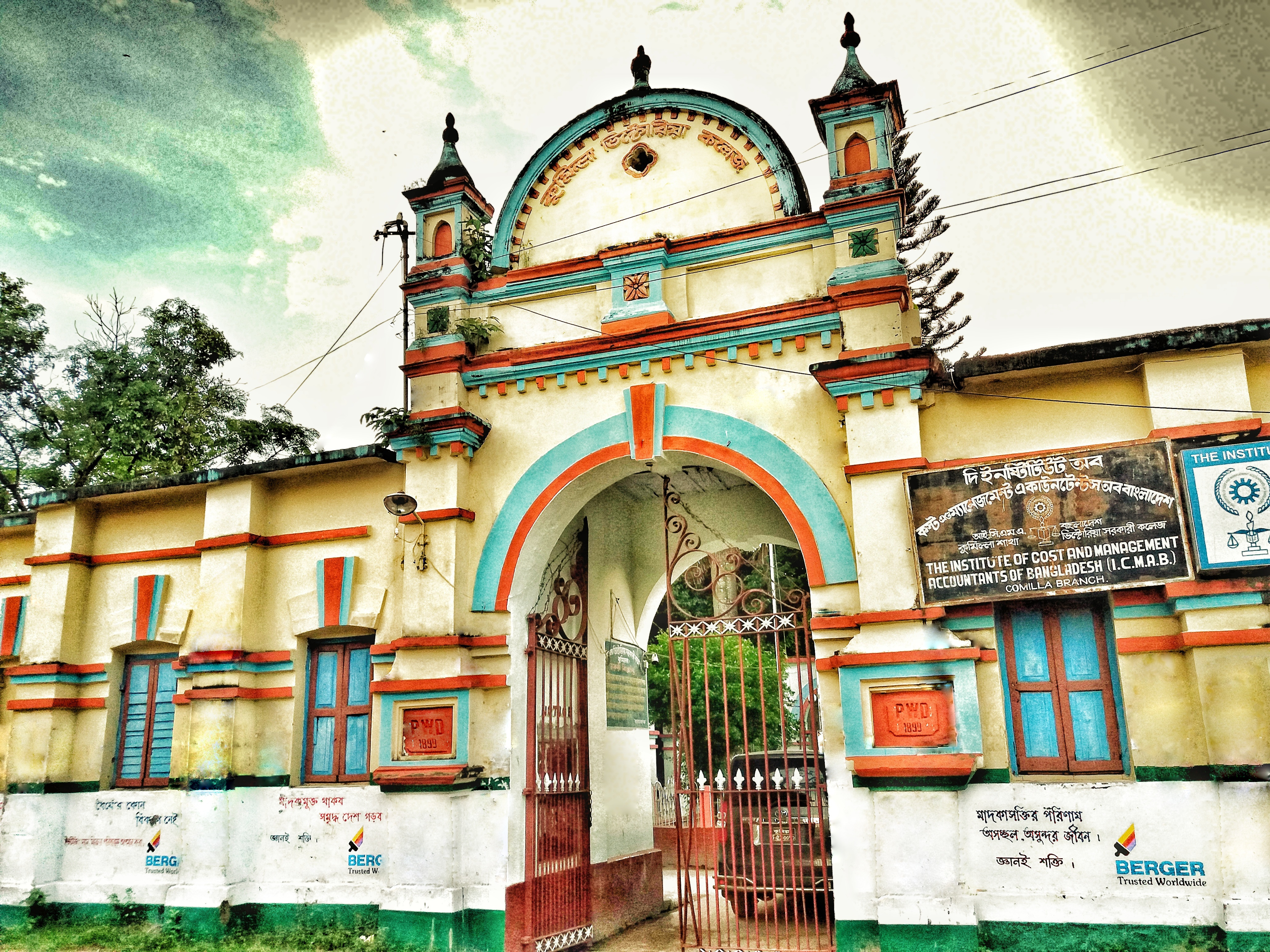

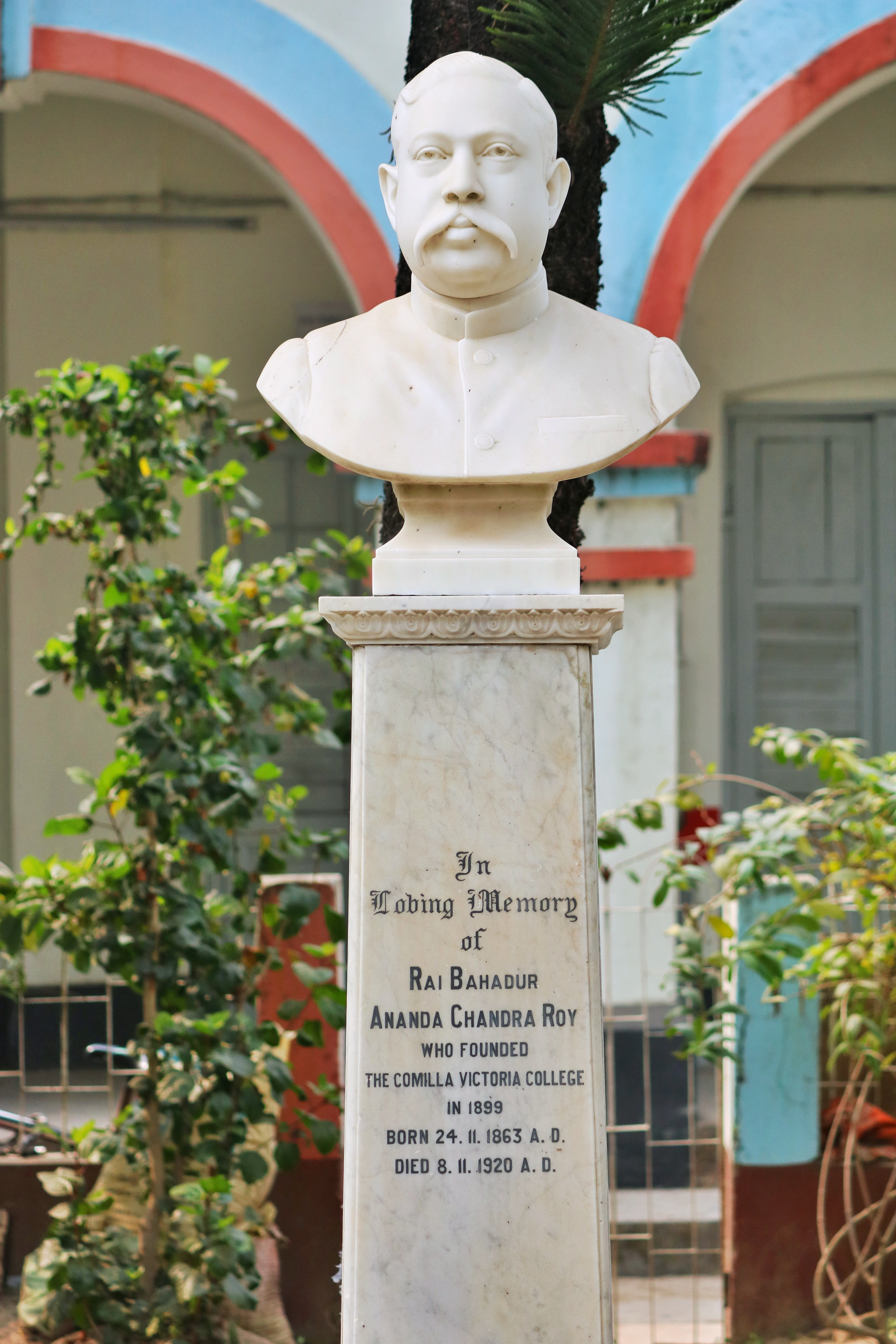

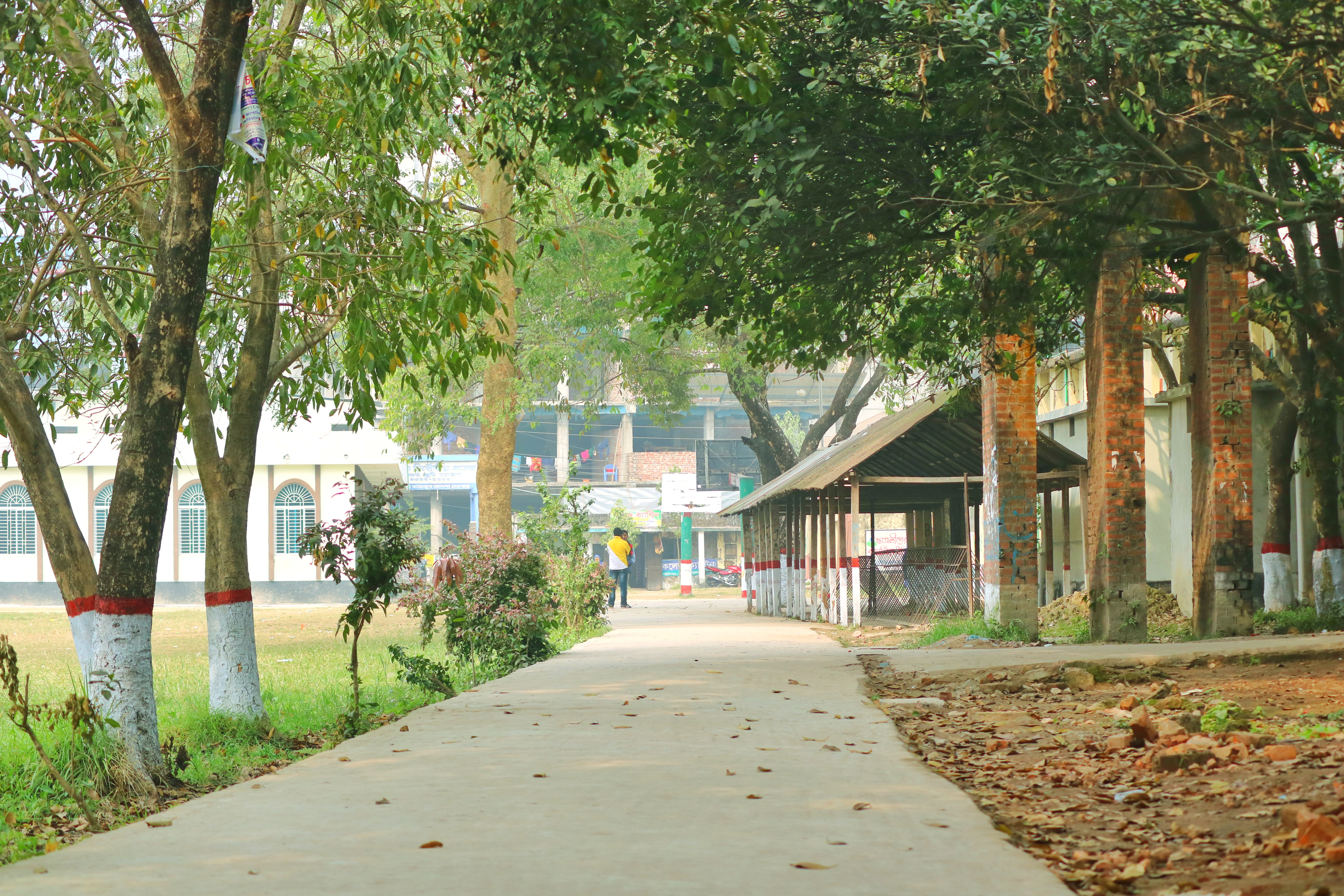

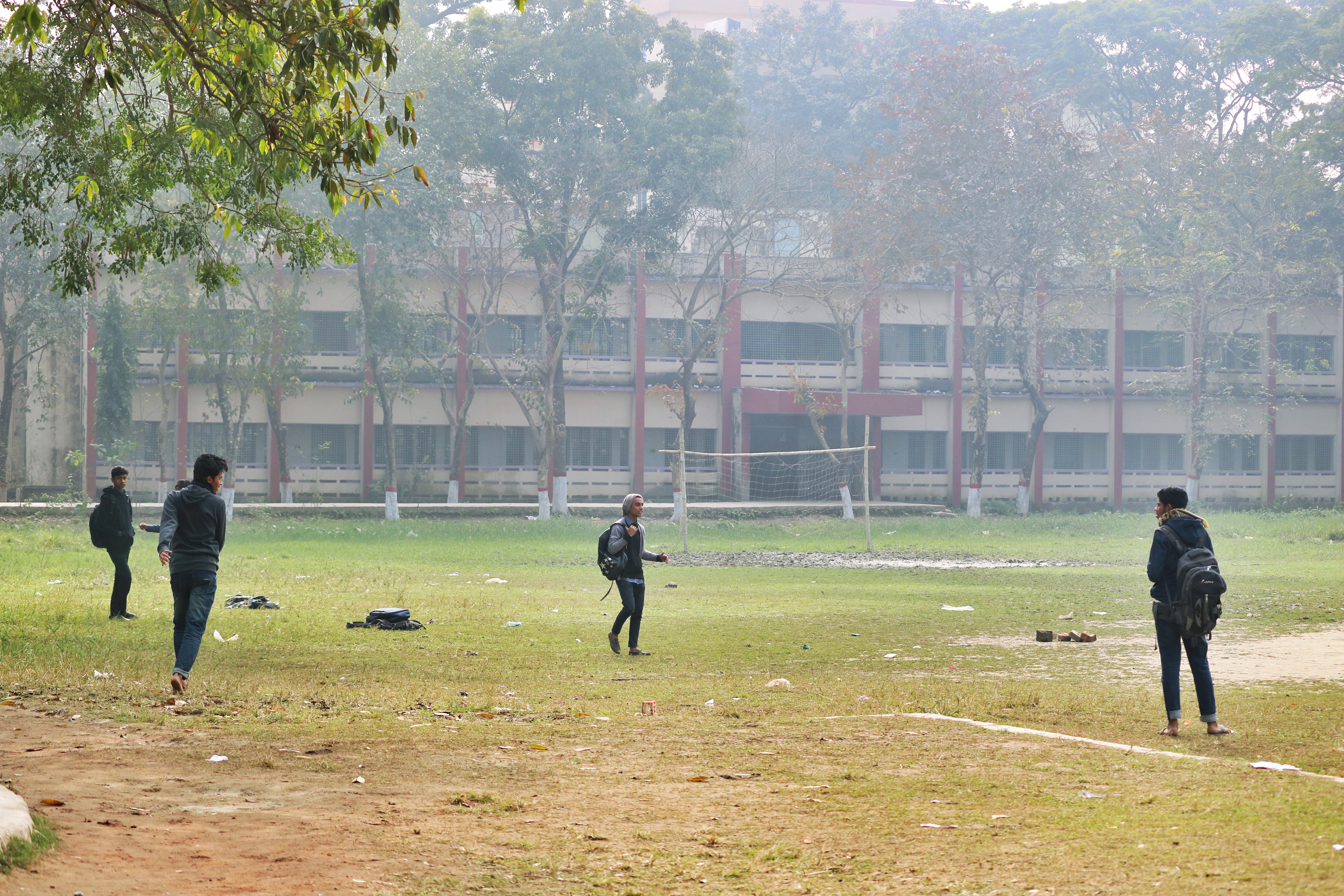

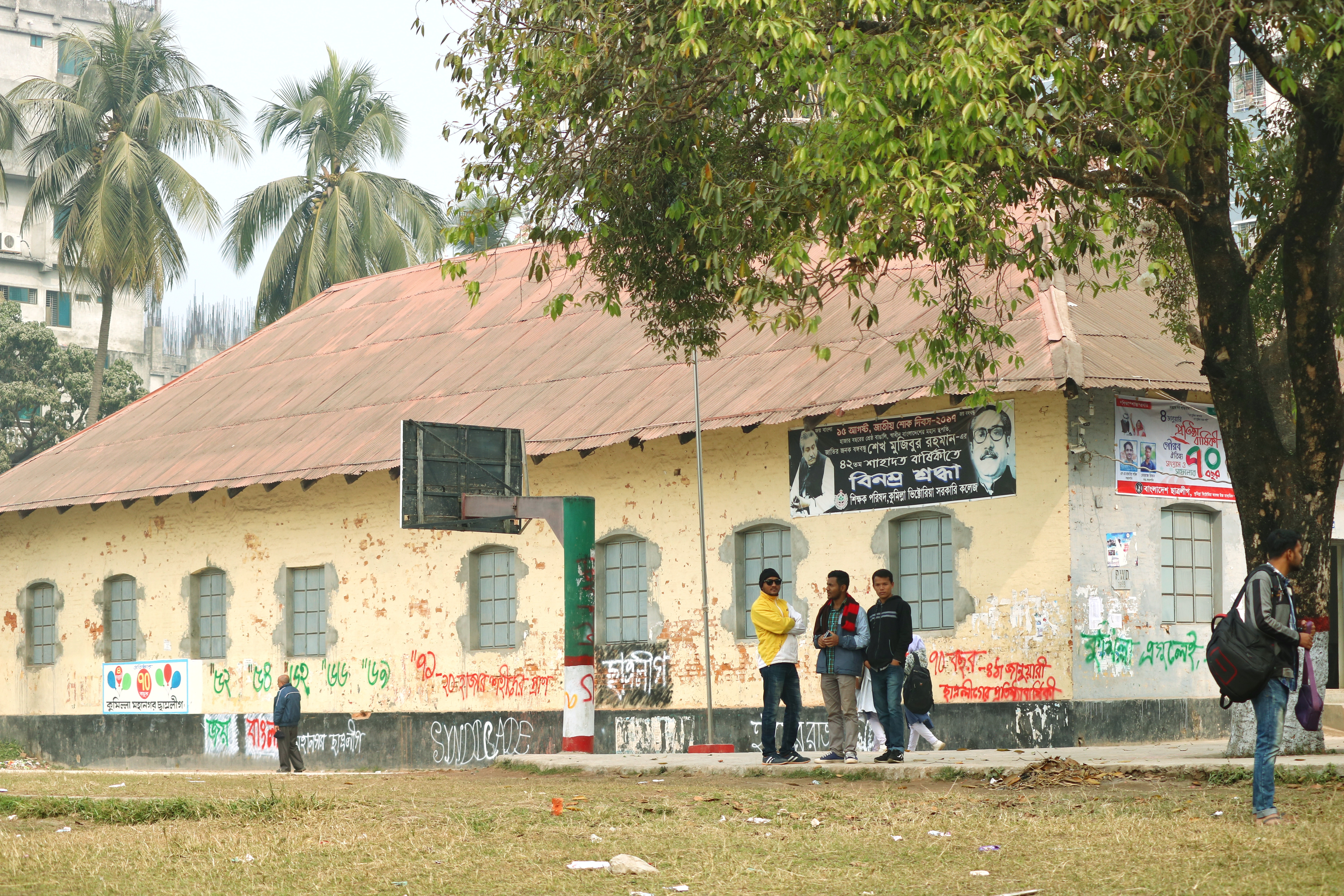

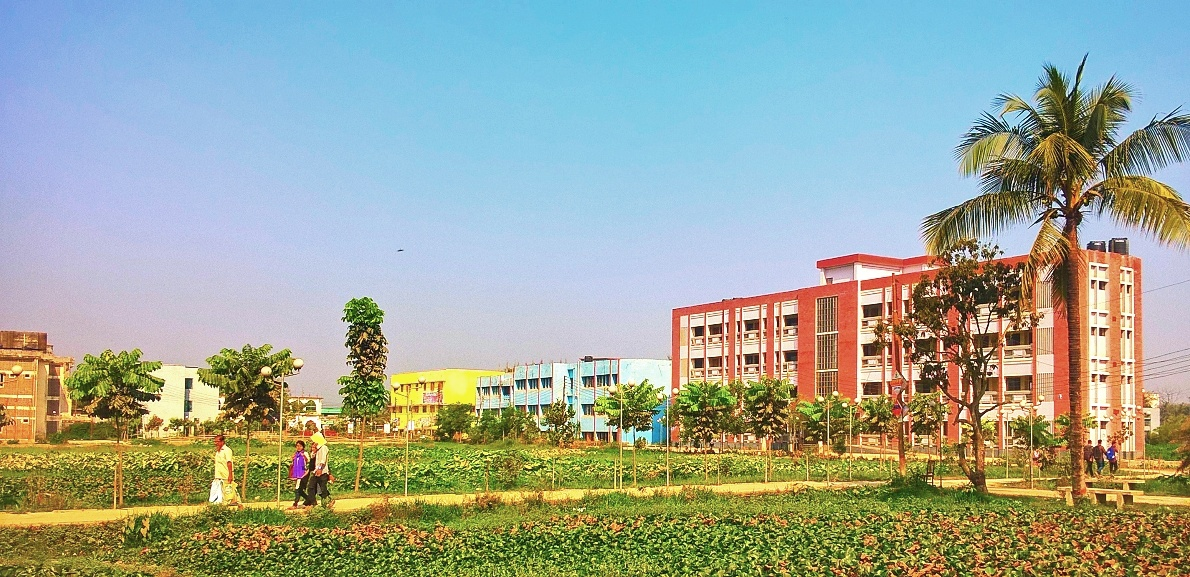

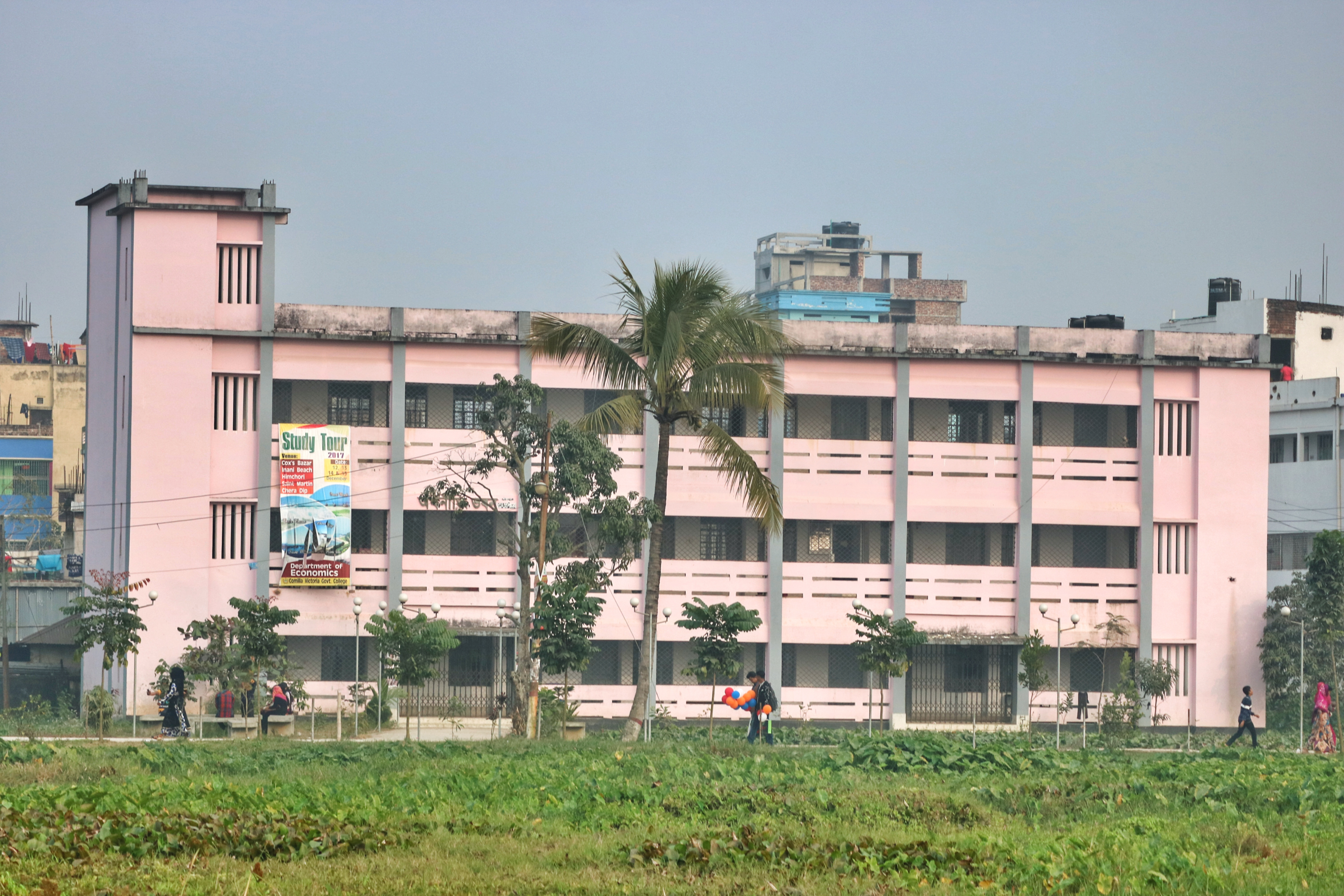

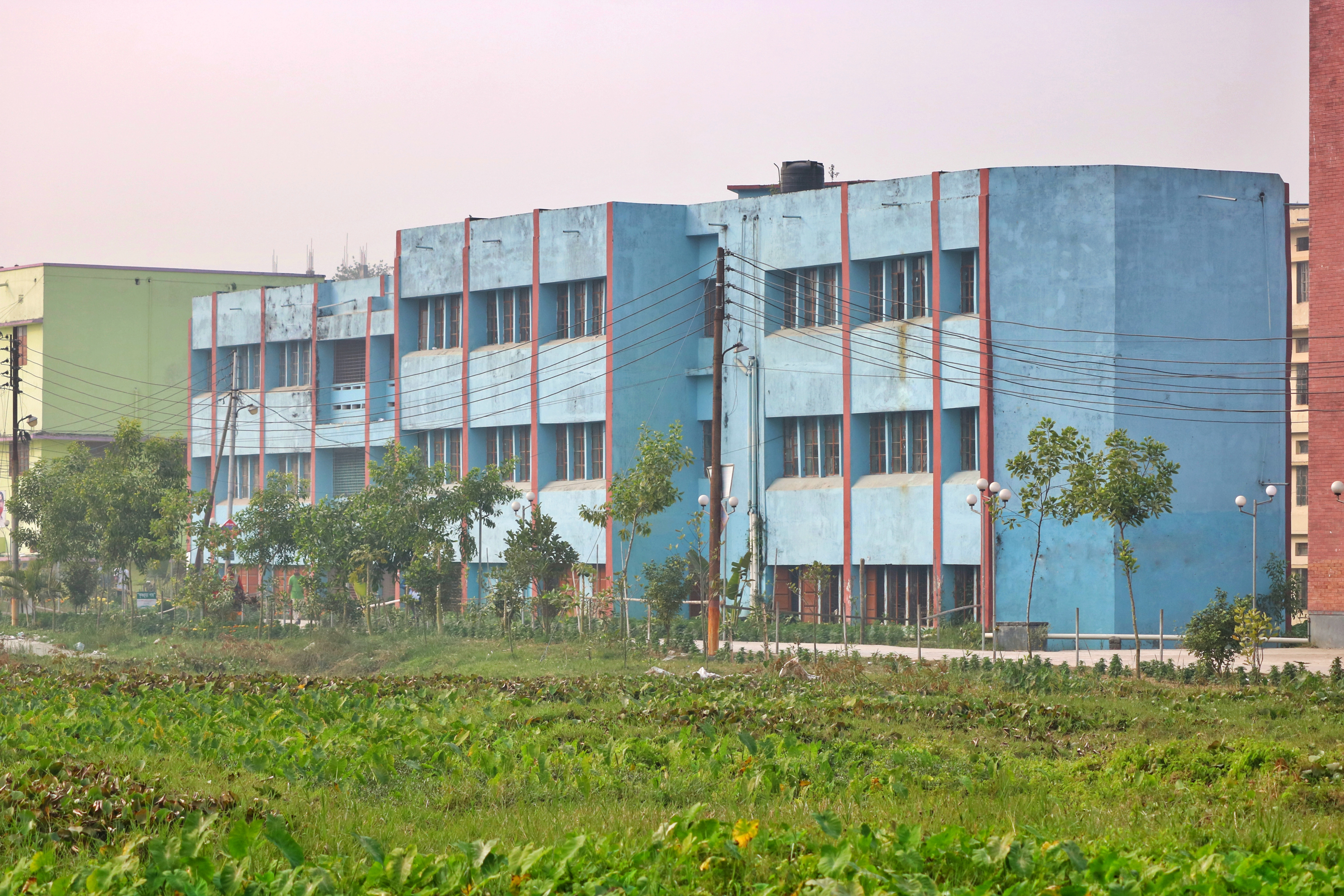

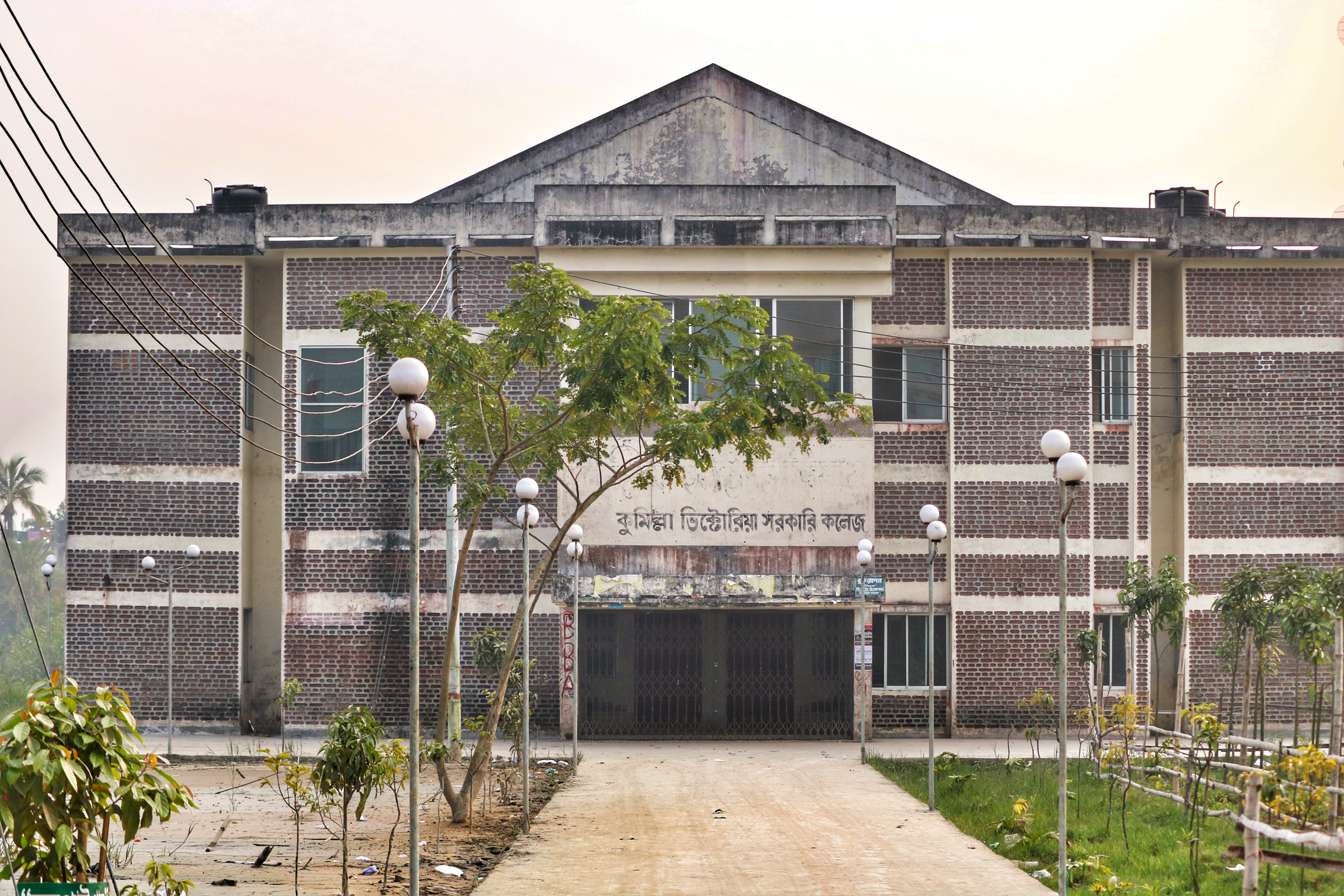

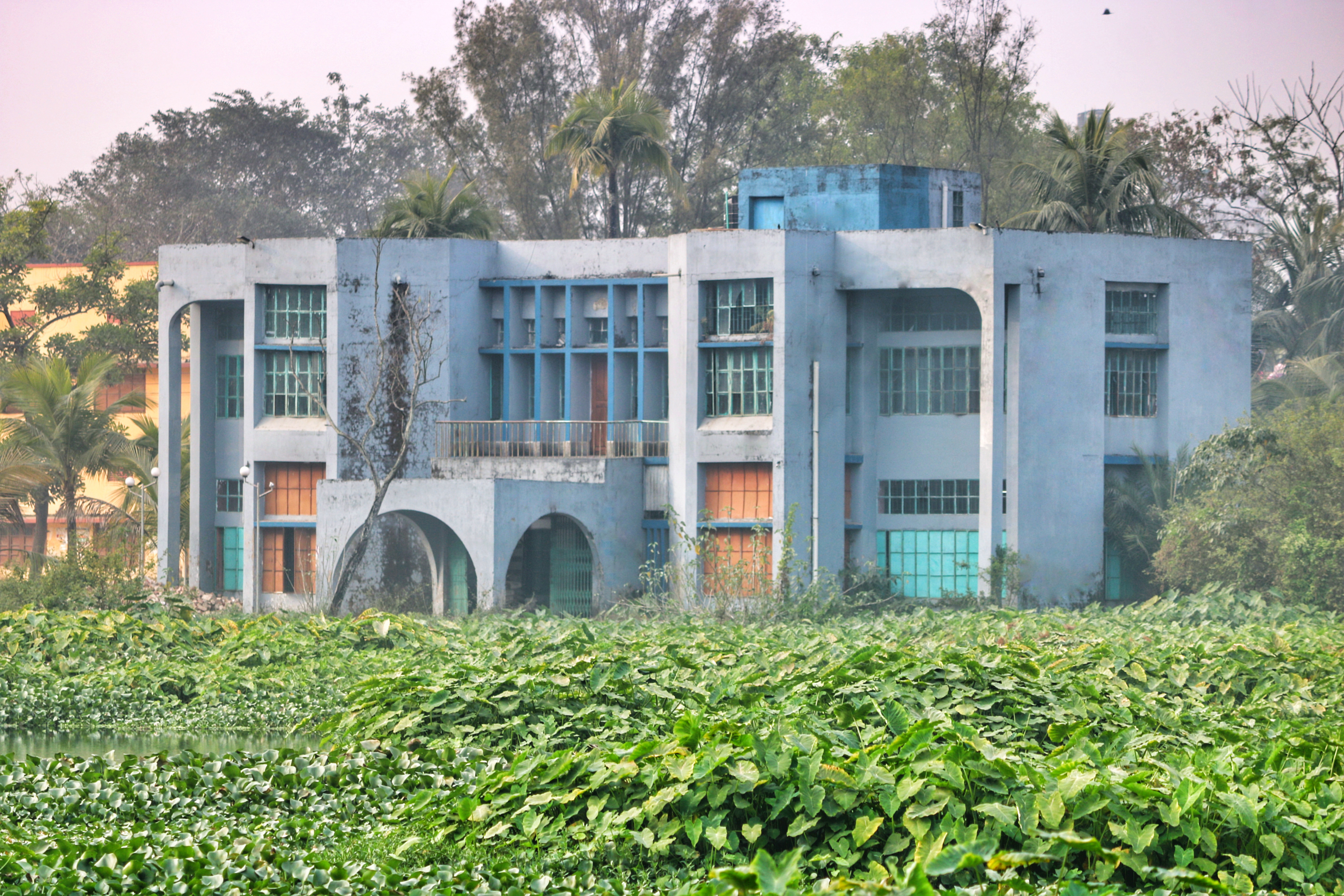

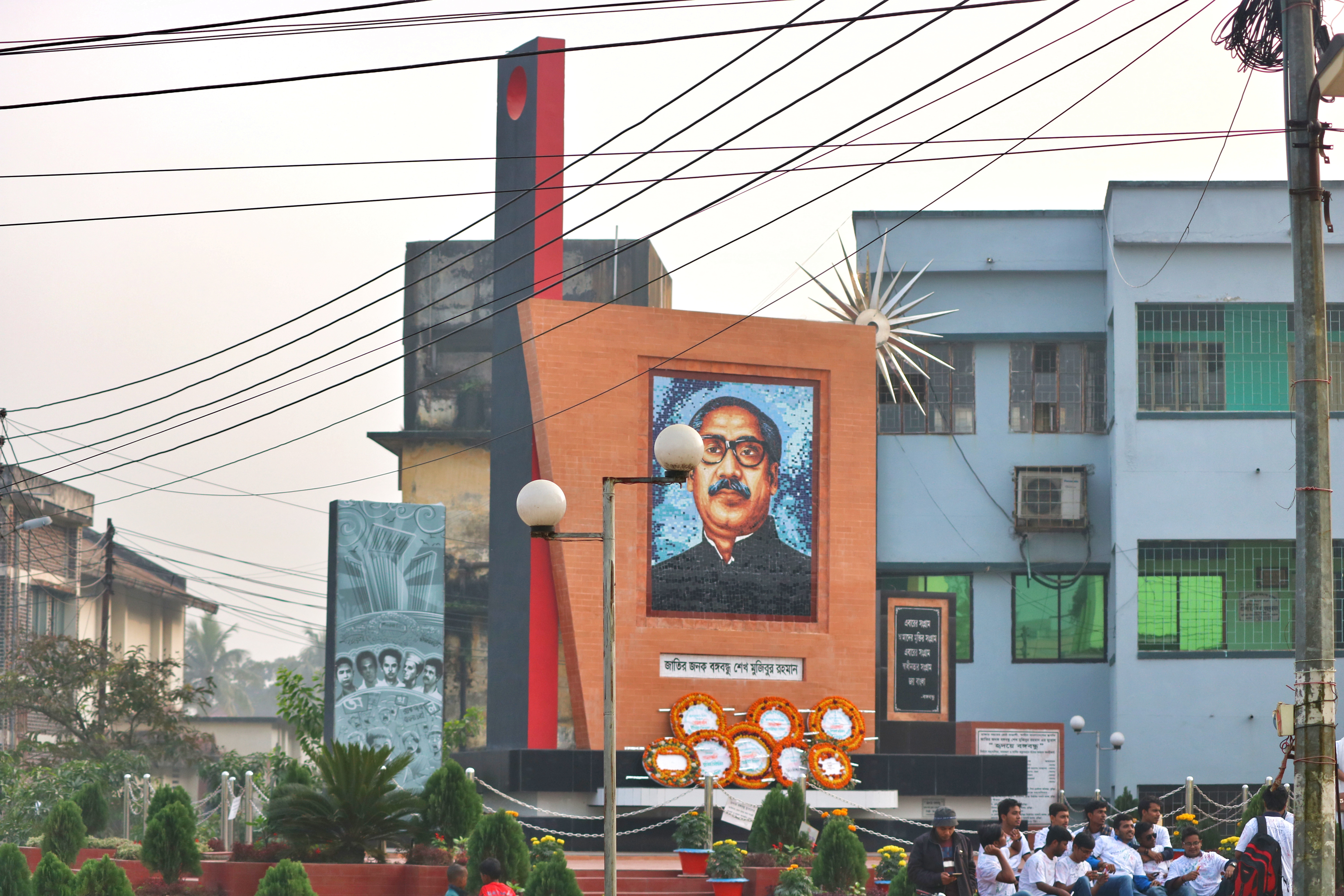

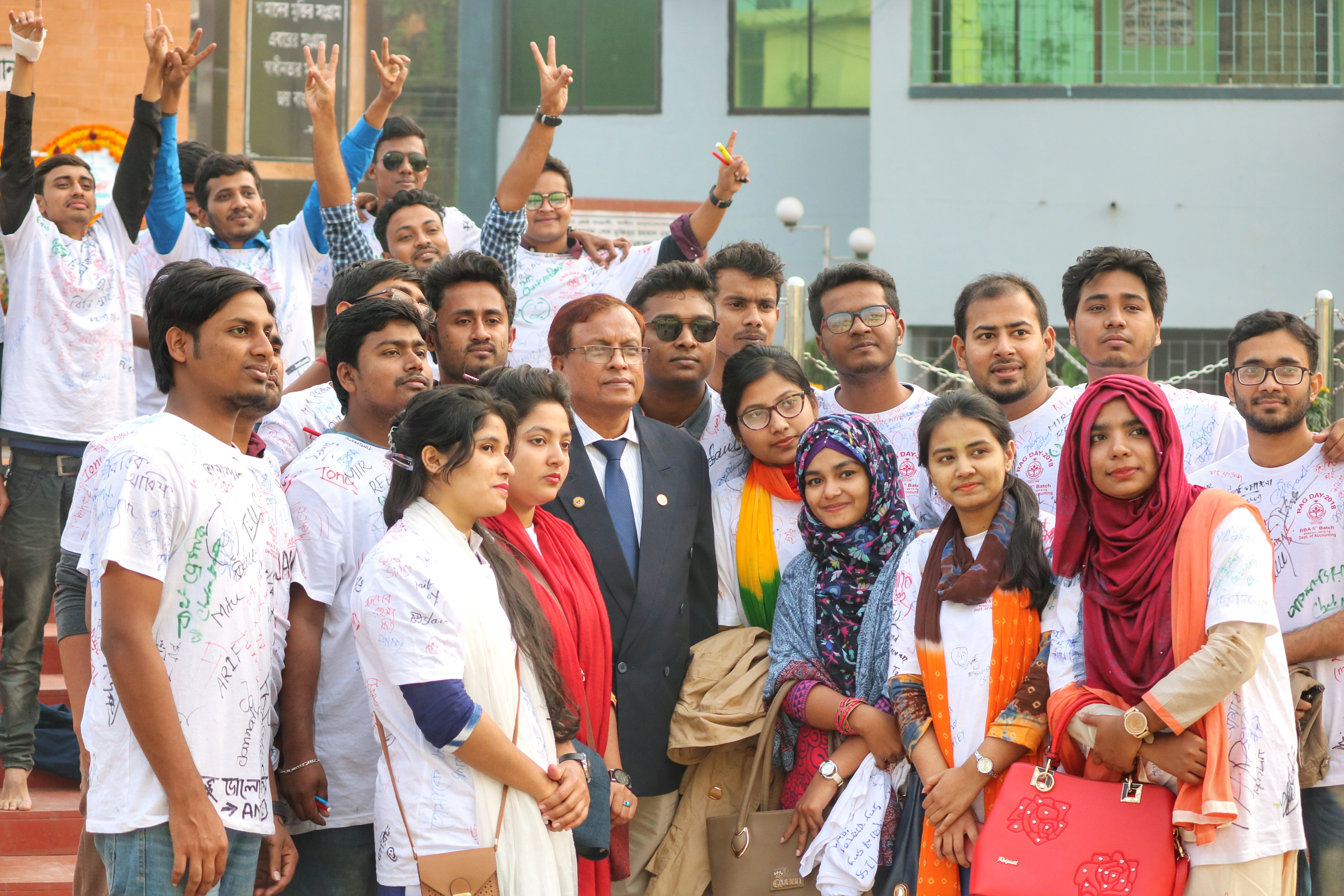

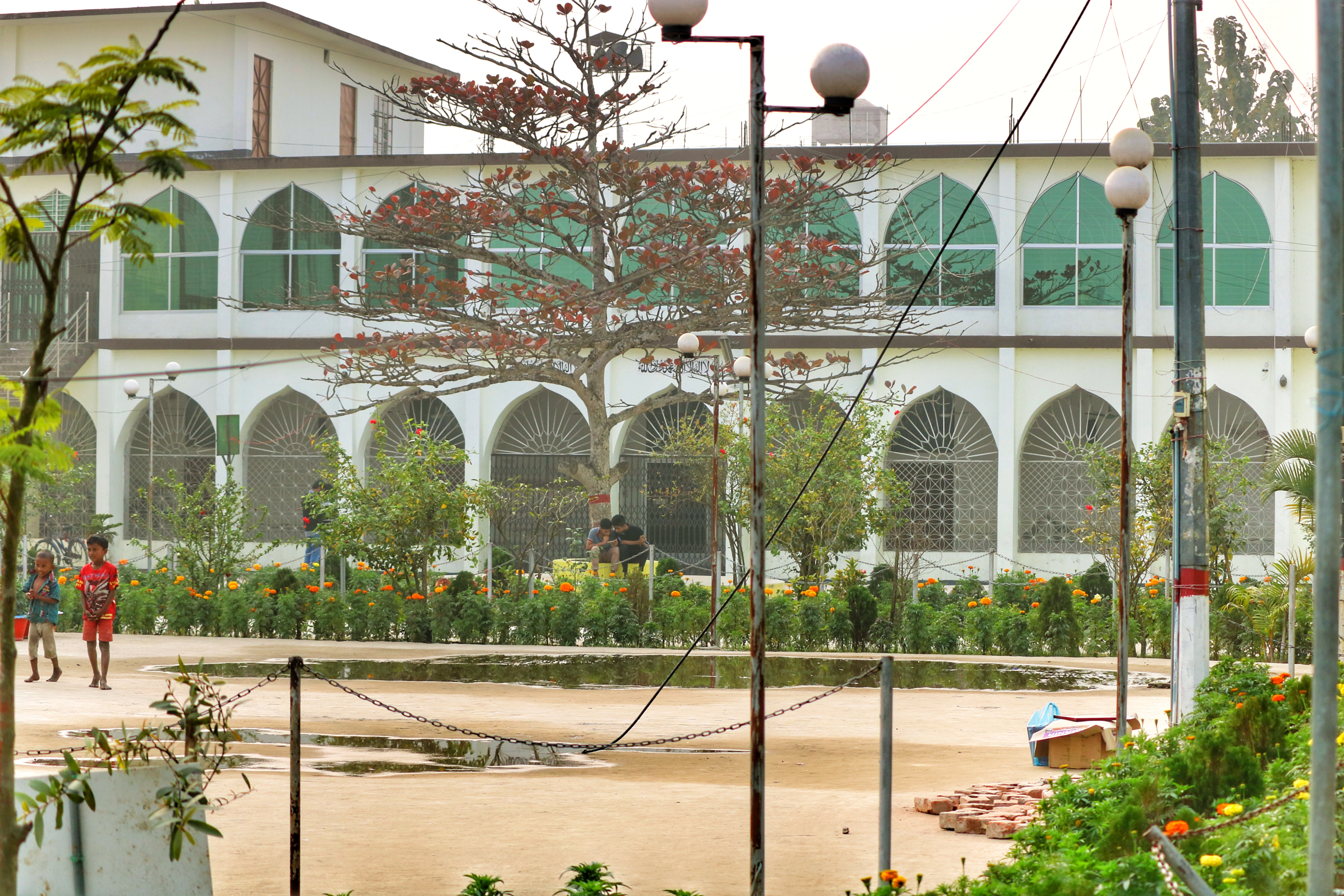

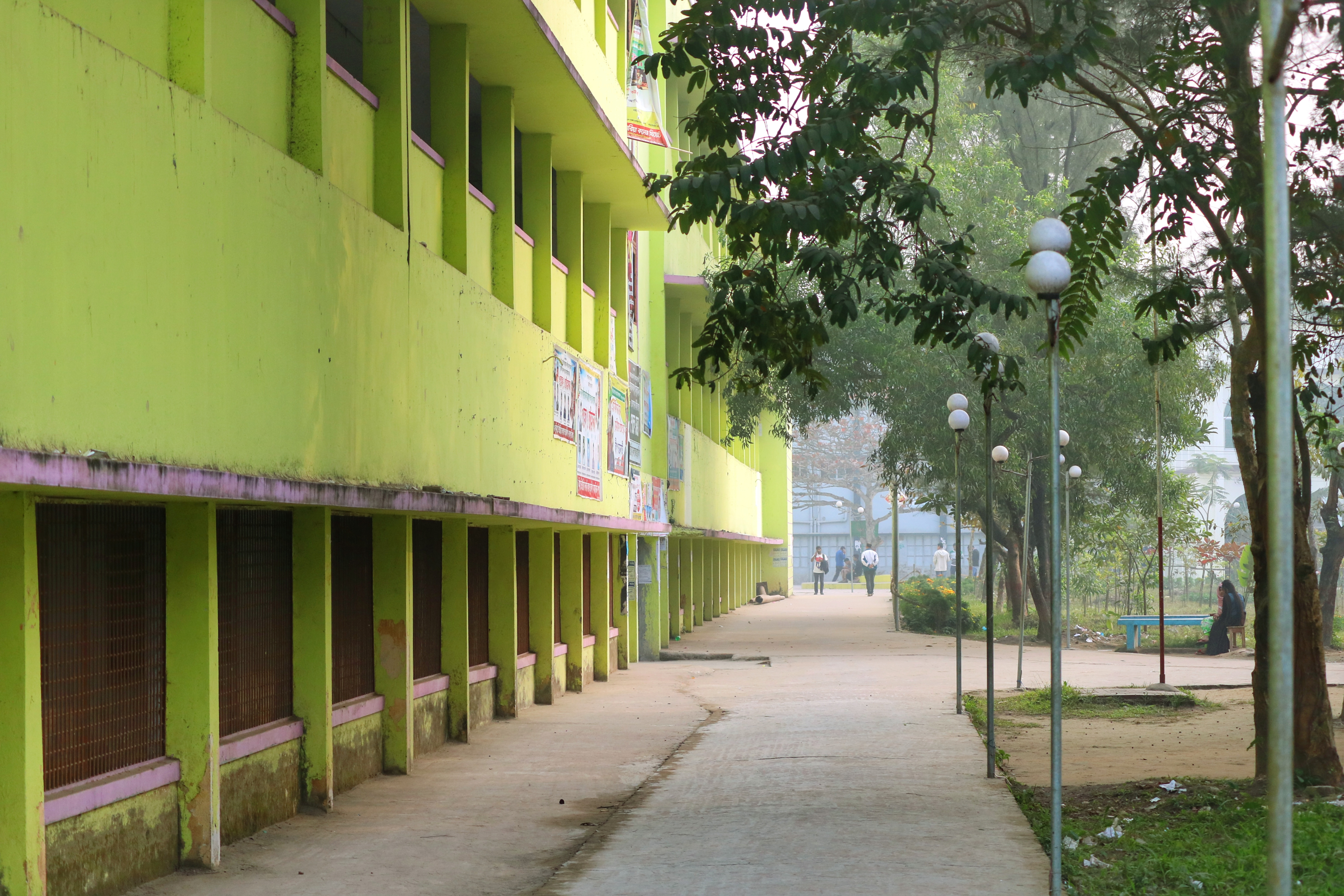

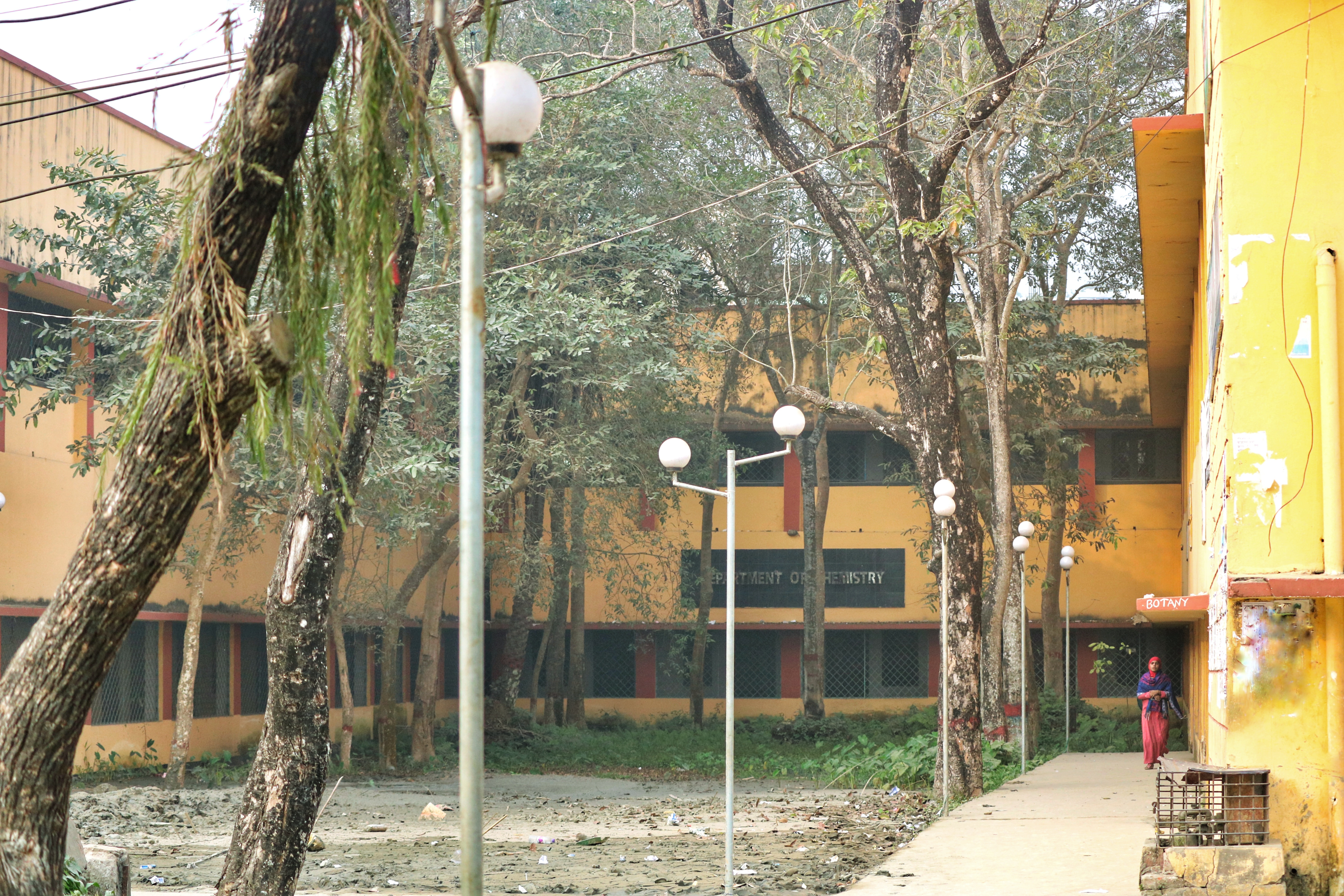

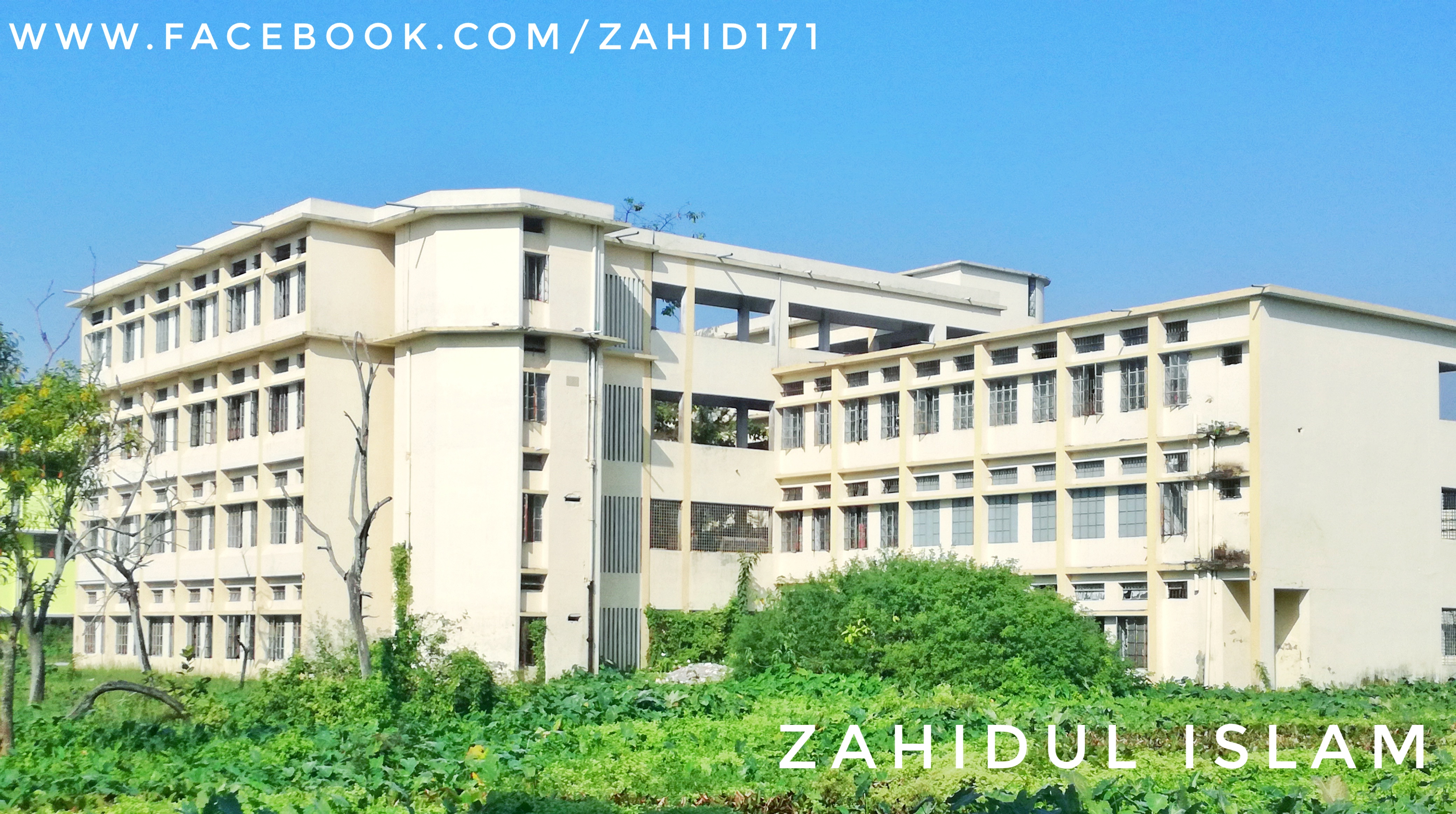

== See also ==
- List of Educational Institutions in Comilla
- Comilla Government Women's College
- Comilla Govt. College
