= Comilla Zilla School =

- কুমিল্লা জিলা স্কুল

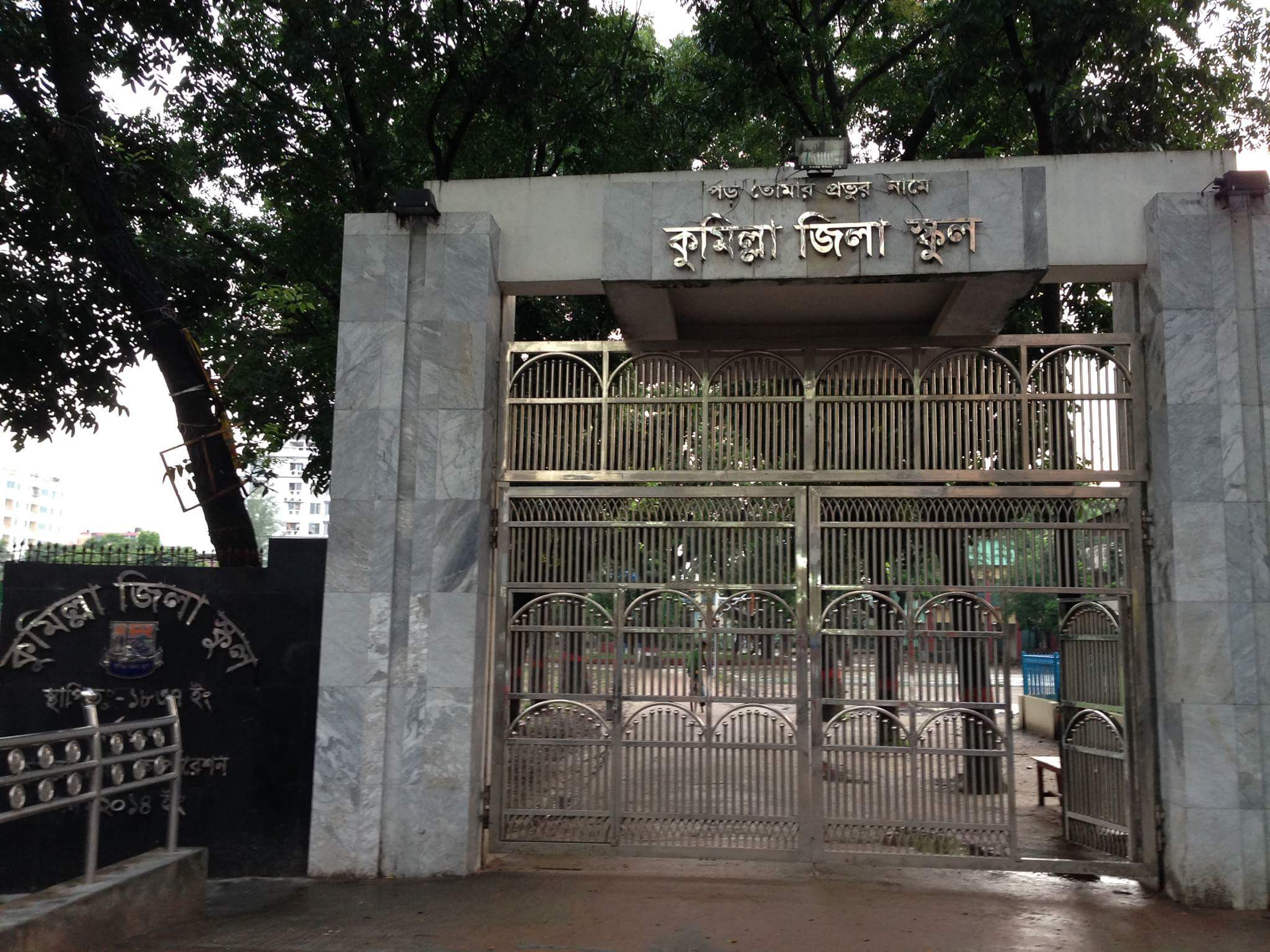
- Symbol of Comilla Zilla School

Location
- Kandirpar, Comilla; Bangladesh; 23.4629°N 91.1817°E

Information
- Type: Public high school
- Motto: পড় তোমার প্রভুর নামে
- Established: 20 July 1837; 189 years ago
- Founder: Henry George Leicester
- School board: Board of Intermediate and Secondary Education, Comilla
- School code: 105770
- Headmaster: Mohammad Abdul Hafiz
- Grades: Class 5 to 10
- Gender: male
- Enrollment: 1,800
- Language: Bengali
- Campus size: 5.69 acres (2.30 ha)
- Website: www.czs.edu.bd

Comilla Zilla School (Bengali: কুমিল্লা জিলা স্কুল) is a public boys' school in Comilla, a city in Bangladesh. It is one of the oldest schools in the country. It was the only school in Comilla when established in 1837.

== History ==
The school is situated at the center of Comilla town. It was established on 20 July 1837 by the Englishman Henry George Leicester and named Comilla Zilla School. later It was set up by the government of British India for teaching English literature and science. At the beginning, there were 37 students only. The school was running under University of Calcutta since 1857. Before that, the academic building of the school was expanded and more facilities were created to upgrade it as a full-fledged high school. The school covers about 5.69 acres of land.

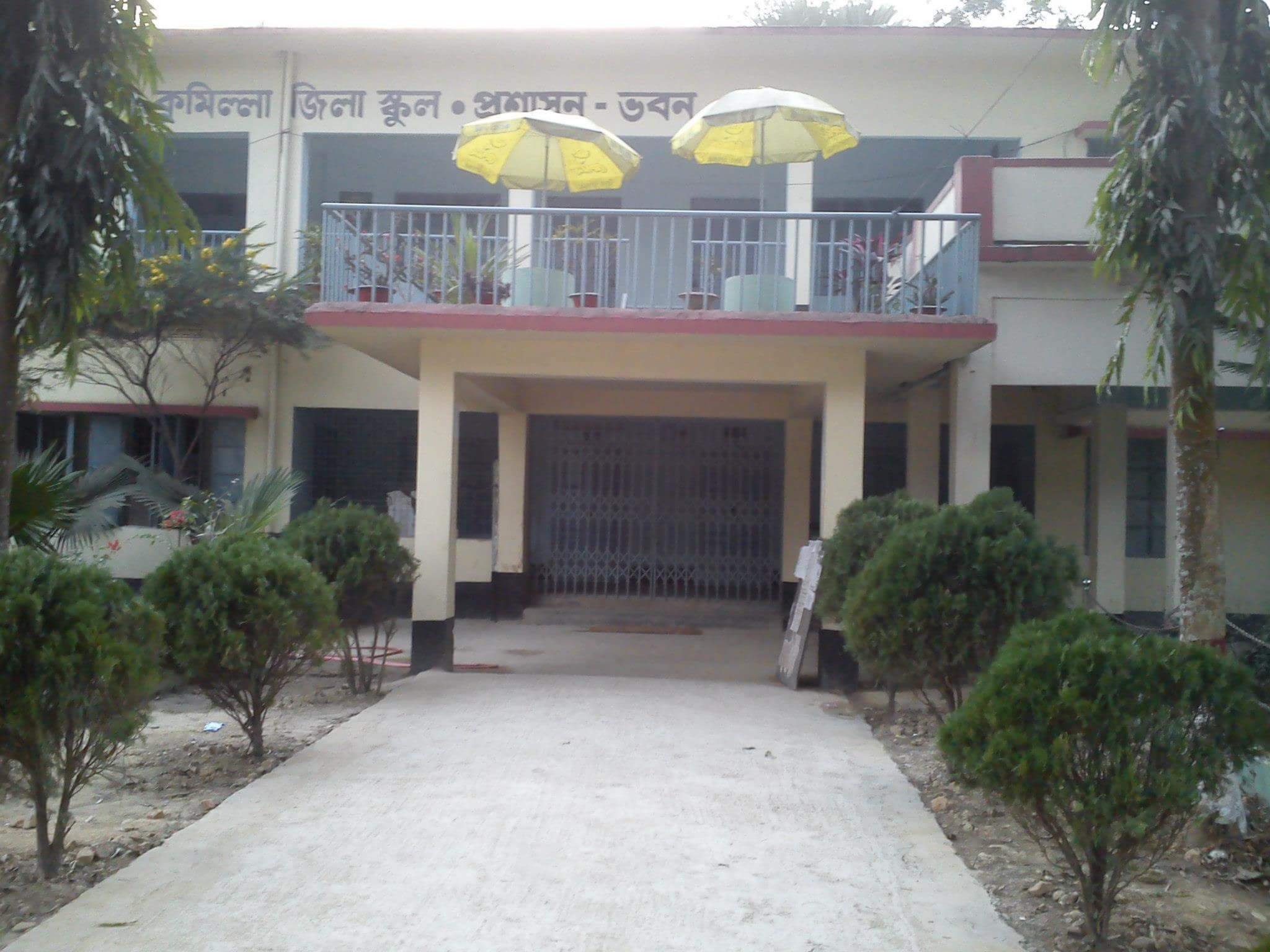
Administrative building of Comilla Zilla School

== Current day ==
When it started, the school only had one shift. From 1991 two shifts were introduced: morning and day. There are two sections in class five: Morning A and Day A. From Class Six to Ten, there are 6 sections in each class: Morning A, B, C, and Day A, B, C. Each section has a maximum of 60 students.

About 1,800 students attend the school, with 53 teachers and 20 administration staff members.

== Facilities ==
The school has three academic buildings, one administration building and two hostels. There is a big field in the school area, as well as a basketball court . Other facilities include mosque, workshop, auditorium, canteen, shaheed minar, and library. The school has five laboratories and a computer lab.

== Achievements ==
Among schools under the Board of Intermediate and Secondary Education, Comilla, the school ranked first numerous times on Secondary School Certificate (SSC) examination.

== Notable alumni ==
- Abu Sayeed M Ahmed, architect
- Mobashwer Ali, writer
- Kamrul Ahsan, ambassador, matriculated in 1977
- Asif Akbar, singer, captained the cricket team
- Gazi Mazharul Anwar, lyricist and filmmaker, won seven Bangladesh National Film Awards
- Iqbal Karim Bhuiyan, chief of army staff (2012–2015)
- S. D. Burman, music director and singer in Bollywood, matriculated in 1920
- Shib Narayan Das, one of the creators of the first national flag
- Sudhin Das, Nazrul Geeti musician, matriculated in 1946
- Dhirendranath Datta, lawyer and politician
- Himangshu Dutta, music director and composer, matriculated in 1924
- Narendra Nath Dutta, Indian physician and industrialist, matriculated in 1906
- Sudhamoy Ghosh, biochemist and pharmacologist
- A.B.M. Khairul Haque, chief justice of Bangladesh (2010–2011)
- AKM Azizul Haque, agriculture minister of Bangladesh (1976–1979)
- Enamul Haque, cricketer
- Yussuf Abdullah Harun, member of parliament, matriculated in 1962
- Syed Mahmud Hossain, chief justice of Bangladesh (2018–2021), matriculated in 1972
- Tofazzal Hossain, Bengali language movement activist
- Rafiqul Islam, campaigner for International Mother Language Day
- Piash Karim, sociologist and political commentator
- Nayeemul Islam Khan, journalist and press secretary to Former Prime Minister Sheikh Hasina
- Apel Mahmood, singer, received the Ekushey Padak
- Arfanul Haque Rifat, mayor of Comilla, earned an SSC in 1974
- Abdullah Sarkar, member of parliament (1973–1975)
- Prabodh Chandra Sen, poet and historian, matriculated in 1915
- Abu Zahid, martyred freedom fighter

== See also ==
- List of Zilla Schools of Bangladesh
- List of Educational Institutions in Comilla
