= Ananda Chandra Roy =

Ananda Chandra Roy can refer to:

- Ananda Chandra Roy (born 1844), Bengali politician and lawyer
- Ananda Chandra Roy (born 1863), Bengali zamidar and patron of education
