= Alfaz =

Alfaz (Bengali: আলফাজ) is a Bengali masculine given name of Arabic origin. It may refer to:

- Alfaz Uddin (1932–2018), politician
- Mohammad Alfaz Ahmed (born 1973), footballer

== See also ==
- Uddin
- Alfazuddin Ahmed, politician
