= Suleman Khan (doctor) =

Suleman Khan was a Bangladesh physician who was killed in the Bangladesh Liberation war and is considered a martyr in Bangladesh.

== Early life ==
Khan was born in Sheikhdi, Faridganj Upazila, Chandpur District, East Bengal, British India on 1939. He finished his SSC from Chandpur Hasan Ali High School in 1955 and HSC from Comilla Victoria College in 1958. In 1967 he completed his MBBS from Dhaka Medical College and finished his internship period in the college. He was married to Shamsunnahar.

== Career ==
Khan worked in Rashed Medical Pharmacy in Gopibagh, Dhaka. In 1969 he joined the Tongi Jute mill as its residential physician. He was also a member of the communist party and cultural group Udichi. In 1969 he founded Taranga, a literary and cultural organisation based in Dhaka. He participated in the Mass Uprising of 1969 in East Pakistan. He edited and published Bengali weekly called Prithibi.

After the start of Bangladesh Liberation war, Khan moved with his family outside of Dhaka. He had provided first aid to those injured by bullets fired by Pakistan Army in Chandpur District. He came into conflict with the Muslim League, which had looted supplies sent by Bangladesh Awami League for members of Mukti Bahini. Khan tried to get the supplies released through mediation.

== Death ==
Khan's home was attacked on 24 April 1971 by pro-Pakistan forces, injuring him, his younger brother, and his mother. Khan died on the way to Chandpur for treatment. He was buried in his family graveyard in Sheikhdi. On 14 December 1996, Bangladesh Post Office issued commemorative posts with his picture on the occasion of Martyred Intellectuals Day.
