= Narendra Nath Dutta =

Indian physician and industrialist

- নরেন্দ্রনাথ দত্ত
- Born: 21 September 1884; Tippera District, Bengal Presidency, British India
- Died: 6 April 1949 (aged 64); Calcutta, West Bengal, Dominion of India
- Education: Calcutta Medical College (M.B.)
- Occupations: industrialist; physician; farmer; businessman
- Years active: 1925–1949
- Organization: Bengal Immunity
- Known for: First commercial production of antibody in the Indian subcontinent
- Relatives: Kamini Kumar Dutta (brother)
- Military career
- Allegiance: British Empire
- Branch: British Indian Army
- Service years: 1916–1925
- Rank: Captain
- Unit: 49th Bengali Regiment
- Conflicts: World War I

Narendra Nath Dutta (21 September 1884 – 6 April 1949) was an Indian Bengali physician and industrialist. He was also known as Captain Naren Dutta and N. N. Dutta.

== Early life ==
On 21 September 1884, Narendra Nath Dutta was born into a poor family in the village of Sreekail in the Tippera district of the Bengal Presidency, British India (now located in Bangra Upazila, Comilla District, Bangladesh). His father was Krishna Kumar Dutta, a teacher at Chittagong Government High School, and his mother was Sharwani Sundari Devi. After his mother died in 1890–1891, Narendra and one of his brothers were left with their aunt, while their father moved to Chittagong with his other two sons. He studied at Dhanpatikhola Primary School and later passed his secondary education from Comilla Zilla School in 1906. Two years later, he completed his higher secondary education from Comilla Victoria College. During this time, he supported his studies by working as a farm laborer, a grocery shop assistant, and a vegetable hawker. He then enrolled in Calcutta Medical College and was able to earn his medical degree in 1915 with financial help from Colonel John Telfer Calvert, principal of Calcutta Medical College, and by working as a porter at the Kidderpore Dock.

== Career ==
After earning his medical degree, Narendra received a position as a government house surgeon at the Presidency General Hospital through the recommendation of principal Calvert. Following Calvert’s advice, he joined the British Indian Army in 1916 as part of the Indian Emergency War Service and participated in World War I. During the war, he served in Mesopotamia, overseeing field service operations and an Assyrian refugee camp. He was promoted to the rank of captain and served as chief medical officer before retiring in 1925. After retirement, he leased around 26.5 acres of land in Nadia district where he started a fruit orchard and fish farming business. At the request of Bidhan Chandra Roy, one of the founders of a pharmaceutical company named Bengal Immunity, he took over the company’s operations and served as its Executive Director. At the time he assumed leadership, the company was in a dire condition. Before 1946, he had turned the company into a profitable and expanding enterprise. He also founded Indian Trawler Limited to manufacture advanced deep-sea fishing trawlers. In addition, he established Radical Insurance Limited, Indian Research Institute, Bharati Printing and Publishing, and Navashakti Newspapers Company.

== Activism and politics ==
Narendra had associations with members of the revolutionary secret organization Jugantar, which led to obstacles from the government when he tried to join the British Indian Army. He was a supporter of Subhas Chandra Bose and a collaborator of the Indian National Congress (INC). He provided medical treatment to injured freedom fighters and politicians from the INC. In 1930, he hid an individual involved in the Chittagong armoury raid from law enforcement authorities in his warehouse located in Baranagar, Twenty-four Parganas district. In 1948, after Bidhan Chandra Roy became the chief minister of the government of West Bengal, he invited Narendra to join his cabinet, but Narendra declined the offer.

== Family life ==
Narendra Nath Dutta, a lifelong bachelor, had three siblings. His eldest brother, Kamini Kumar Dutta, was a lawyer in Tippera District and served as the law minister of Pakistan. His youngest brother, Surendra Nath Dutta, joined the Indian Civil Service and worked in the government’s forest department, while his middle brother, Debendra Nath Dutta, was a steel businessman.

== Death and legacy ==
Narendra Nath Dutta died of a heart attack on 6 April 1949 at his residence at 153 Dharmatala Street (now Lenin Sarani) in Calcutta, the capital of West Bengal, Dominion of India, after returning from his birthplace on 26 March 1949. Through his efforts, Bengal Immunity played a vital role in marketing essential medicines at low cost and in the development of vaccines. In 1949, the government of West Bengal accused Dutta of tax evasion amounting to nearly ₹5.8 million over eight years, which he admitted. After his death, his heirs appealed the tax case and paid approximately ₹5.2 million following a 1960 verdict. He was a patron of the Jugantar Patrika and served as the president of its board of directors until his death. Eight years before his death, he established a college named Bani Pith (present-day Sreekail Government College) in his birthplace. He also founded the Krishna Kumar Dutta Memorial Trust. In 1955, the school he established in Baranagar was renamed Baranagar Narendra Nath Vidya Mandir in his honor. Two books have been published about his life: Captain Narendranather Jiban-Katha by Amulyaratan Chakraborty, and Ekjon Captain Dutter Tin Shatabdir Galpo edited by Joynal Hossain.
