= The Mother Language Lovers Of The World =

Non-profit organisation in Canada

The Mother Language Lovers Of The World Society
- Formation: 1998
- Headquarters: Vancouver, Canada
- Region served: Bangladesh
- Official language: Bengali
- Website: www.motherlanguagelovers.com

The Mother Language Lovers Of The World Society (MLLWS) (Bengali: বিশ্ব মাতৃভাষা প্রেমী সোসাইটি) is a non-profit organization committed to the protection, promotion, and celebration of linguistic diversity. Based in Surrey, British Columbia, Canada, MLLWS brings together people from various linguistic and cultural backgrounds to uphold the significance of mother languages, strengthen multiculturalism, and foster intercultural understanding.

Mission and Contributions:

MLLWS works to ensure that mother languages are preserved, respected, and integrated into mainstream society. The organization actively engages in initiatives that promote linguistic diversity, cultural heritage, and multilingual education. One of its most significant contributions is advocating for the recognition of International Mother Language Day (IMLD) globally and in Canada.

21 February is known as the Language Movement Day, which is a national holiday of Bangladesh taking place on 21 February each year and commemorating the Bengali language movement.

Mother Language Lovers of the World (MLLW) played a pivotal role in promoting the historic recognition of IMLD by UNESCO in 1999, which was first proposed by the late Mr. Rafiqul Islam, the founding president of Mother Language Lovers of the World - MLLW (Society was formed in 2012). With the support of the Bangladesh Government and 29 other countries, including Canada, UNESCO unanimously designated February 21st as International Mother Language Day, observed annually since 2000.

Historic Recognition of IMLD in Canada:

MLLWS has also played a key role in advocating for the official recognition of IMLD in Canada. MLLWS President Mr. Aminul Islam MGC worked with Canadian policymakers and community leaders for over a decade to make this a reality.

On March 30, 2023, the Canadian Parliament passed Bill S-214, officially recognizing February 21st as International Mother Language Day in Canada. The High Commissioner of Bangladesh to Canada, H.E. Dr. Khalilur Rahman, was present at the House of Commons to witness this historic moment. Following the bill’s passage, on April 27, 2023, Bill S-214 received Royal Assent from His Majesty, King Charles III, formally enacting the recognition of International Mother Language Day in Canada.

Beyond legislative achievements, Some of its key initiatives include:

- The "BC Model" – A framework introduced by Mr. Aminul Islam to integrate mother language education into Canadian school systems.
- The Mother Language Festival – Canada’s largest festival dedicated to linguistic and cultural heritage, celebrated annually since 2013.
- "Lingua Aqua" Mother Language Monument – Established in Surrey, Canada, in 2009, this is Canada’s first mother language monument, initiated by MLLWS and fully funded by the City of Surrey.

== History ==
The Mother Language Lovers Of The World was established by Rafiqul Islam in 1998 with ten members from different countries in Vancouver, Canada. In 1999, The Mother Language Lovers Of The World successfully got UNESCO to declare 21 February the International Mother Language Day.

The Mother Language Lovers Of The World was awarded the Ekushey Padak in 2001.
