= Ajit Kumar Guha =

Bengali educationist

- অজিত কুমার গুহ
- Born: 15 April 1914; Comilla District, Bengal Presidency, British India
- Died: 12 November 1969 (aged 55); Comilla, East Pakistan, Pakistan
- Education: Comilla Victoria College; Calcutta University
- Occupation: Educationist

Ajit Kumar Guha (15 April 1914 – 12 November 1969) was a Bengali educationist. He was awarded Ekushey Padak in 2013 posthumously by the Government of Bangladesh.

== Education and career ==
Guha passed the matriculation from Ishwar Pathshala and intermediate from Comilla Victoria College in 1930 and 1932 respectively. He earned his bachelor's from Comilla Victoria College under University of Dhaka in 1934 and completed master's from Calcutta University in 1939. He studied at Visva-Bharati University in Santiniketan from 1940 to 1942.

Guha started teaching at the Priyanath High School from 1942 until 1948. He then joined the Jagannath College as a professor in the Department of Bangla. He served as a part-time professor in the Department of Bangla at the University of Dhaka.
