= The Grave (play) =

1966 play

- Author: Munier Chowdhury
- Original title: কবর
- Language: Bengali
- Genre: Play
- Publisher: Ahmed Publishing House
- Publication date: 1966
- Publication place: Bangladesh
- Pages: 64

The Grave (Bengali: কবর, lit. 'Kobor') is a 1966 one-act play by Bangladeshi author Munier Chowdhury. Though the author finished writing this play on 17 February 1953, it was published in 1966. It is the first revolutionary play of East Bengal. The background of Kobor focuses on the crisis of the Bengali language movement which took place on 21 February 1952 in Dhaka.

== History ==
Munier Chowdhury was arrested for taking active part in the Language Movement in January 1953. On 17 January, He received a letter from Ranesh Das Gupta. In that letter, Ranesh requested Munier Chowdhury for writing a play to observe the Language Movement Day. The Grave is actually an aesthetic portrayal of a special situation. This play was first staged at the Dhaka Central Jail. Political prisoners who were arrested for being active in the Bengali Language Movement played the characters. Lamps (hurricane) were used to portray the solitude of the graveyard. Kobor is very much influenced by Irwin Shaw's Bury the Dead (1936). Munier Chowdhury Himself admitted in a later interview, that he may have copied Bury the dead unwittingly, because he read that a few months earlier.

== Characters ==
- Murda Fakir

Murda Fakir has made the biggest contribution in taking the whole drama to another height. He saw all his relatives die before his eyes in the Bengal famine of 1943, he could not even bury the people. From then on, he lost his mental balance and became a permanent resident of the graveyard. His dramatic arrival on the scene took place by suddenly saying 'jhunta'. Since his arrival, he has been talking about various things, which will seem like a crazy delusion. But with a little thought, the depth of each of his dialogues can be realized. According to him, there is still life in the bodies buried in the ground, he called Hafiz and The Leader dead. The essence of the play has been revealed through these words. The language martyrs have not died, they will always be bright in the pages of history.

- Police Inspector Hafiz

Hafiz is a flattering police officer who is seen teasing the leader for most of the drama. This man, devoid of ideals, is ready to do anything for his own benefit. As a man, he is very cunning, The Leader acts recklessly in difficult situations, but Hafiz is seen as a visionary throughout the play.

- The Political Leader

An utterly dishonest man, blinded by greed for power, has tried to carry on a great event like The Language Movement as a 'little mess'. According to his commentary, the language martyrs were disobedient naughty boys, shooting at them as punishment for disobedience! Being drunk all the time points to his character flaws. Moreover, the various behaviors of other dishonest leaders and activists of the society also came to light through this character.

- The Guard
- The Person (with The Political Leader)

== Plot ==
The playwright creates a supernatural and mysterious atmosphere in the graveyard. The whole incident takes place inside the graveyard. The play moves forward through the dialogue between The Leader and Inspector Hafiz in a semi-drunk state. Suddenly, Murda Fakir appears like an incorporeal soul. Both The Leader and Hafiz fear him in their minds. Apparently there is a combination of madness in his words but it is the exterior of the play. His every word is metaphorical. The cry in his chest is the cry of conscience, the cry of the country and the nation. After saying goodbye to The Leader and Hafiz, Fakir goes some distance and comes back and says, "Smell! The smell of dead bodies on you! What are you doing here? Go, hurry to the grave! You want to have fun by sending them to the grave by trickery, don't you? No, this will not work in my state."
Those whom they have unjustly killed are alive and well. That is why the corpses do not want to enter the grave, they rebel. They protested Hafiz's words, saying, "It's a lie. We are not dead. We did not want to die. We will not die...we will not go to the grave."
