= Ferdousi Mazumder =

Bangladeshi actress

- ফেরদৌসী মজুমদার
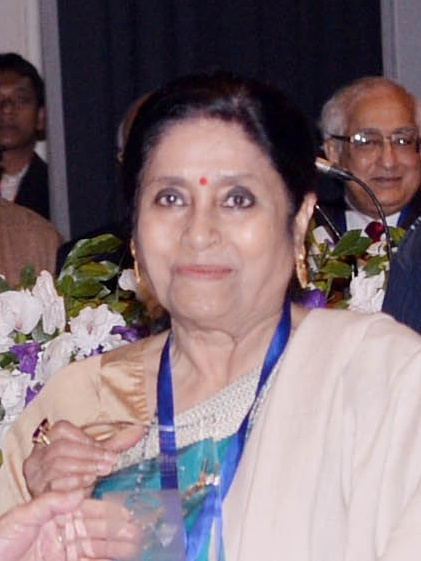
- Ferdousi Mazumder in 2016
- Born: Ferdous Ara Begum; 18 June 1943 (age 82)
- Education: MA (Bengali and Arabic)
- Alma mater: University of Dhaka
- Occupation: Actor
- Spouse: Ramendu Majumdar
- Children: 1
- Relatives: Munier Chowdhury (brother); Kabir Chowdhury (brother)
- Awards: See full list

Ferdousi Mazumder (née Ara Begum; born 18 June 1943) is a Bangladeshi film, television and stage actress. She was awarded Ekushey Padak (1998), Independence Day Award (2020) and Bangla Academy Literary Award (2020) by the government of Bangladesh. As of 2009, on stage she has given over 1200 performances of about 35 plays, mostly for her own group, Theatre. Director Abdullah Al Mamun called her "one of the most sought after actresses of the golden era of BTV dramas".

== Early life ==
Mazumder was an intermediate student of Eden College. She earned her master's degree in both Bengali and Arabic from the University of Dhaka.

== Career ==
Mazumder started her drama career through her brother, Munier Chowdhury, a playwright and novelist. She first acted in the drama Daktar Abdullahar Karkhana, written by Shawkat Osman, which was a production of the then Iqbal Hall of the University of Dhaka. Ferdousi also acted in the first televised drama of the East Pakistan branch of PTV (now Bangladesh Television), Ektala Dotala (1964). Over the years, she performed in plays like Kokilara, a one-woman play, Eka, a one-character non-verbal play, Tamoshi, written by Nilima Ibrahim and others. She directed five stage plays including Meherjan Arekbar, Tahara Tokhono, Chithi and Dui Bon.

After the independence of Bangladesh, in 1972, a group of Chhatra Shikkhak Natya Goshthi members formed a theatre troupe calling it Theatre. Majumdar was one of the founding members of the troupe.

== Personal life ==
Mazumder is married to Ramendu Majumdar since around 1970. Together they have a daughter, Tropa Mazumder (b. 1973). Her father, Khan Bahadur Abdul Halim Chowdhury, was a district magistrate. Her brother Munier Chowdhury was an educationist and writer. Another brother, Kabir Chowdhury, was a professor and intellectual. Another two brothers Lt. Colonel Abdul Qayyum Chowdhury and Mehboob Chowdhury served in the Pakistan Army.

== Awards ==
- Bangla Academy Literary Award (2020)
- Independence Day Award (2020)
- Ekushey Padak (1998)
- William Kerry Award (1998)
- Bangladesh Shilpakala Academy Award for Best Actor (1978)
- First National TV Award for Best Acting (1975)
- Sequence Award of Merit for performance in TV for a decade

== Works ==
- Daktar Abdullahar Karkhana
- Eka
- Songsoptok
- Kokilara
- Tamoshi
- Payer Awaj Pawa Jay
- Ekhon Dushshoomoy
- Dui Bon
- Shubochon Nirbashone
- Ghore Baire
- Meraj Fakirer Ma
- Madhobi
- Mukti
