= Kabir Chowdhury =

Bangladeshi academic and writer

- কবীর চৌধুরী

President of Bangla Academy
- In office 22 February 2009 – 13 December 2011
- Preceded by: M. Harunur Rashid
- Succeeded by: Anisuzzaman

Personal details
- Born: Abul Kalam Mohammad Kabir Manik; 9 February 1923 Brahmanbaria, Bengal Presidency, British India
- Died: 13 December 2011 (aged 88) Dhaka, Bangladesh
- Spouse: Meher Kabir (m. 1945)
- Parents: Abdul Halim Chowdhury (father); Afia Kabir (mother)
- Relatives: Munier Chowdhury (brother); Ferdousi Mazumder (sister)
- Education: University of Dhaka; University of Southern California; University of Minnesota
- Occupation: Educationist; writer; translator
- Awards: Full list

Kabir Chowdhury (9 February 1923 – 13 December 2011) was a Bangladeshi academic, essayist, materialist, translator, cultural worker and civil society activist. He received Bangla Academy Literary Award (1973), Ekushey Padak (1991) and Independence Day Award (1997). He became a National Professor of Bangladesh in 1998.

== Early life and education ==
Kabir Chowdhury was born in Brahmanbaria of the then Tipperah district of the Bengal Presidency where his father, Khan Bahadur Abdul Halim Chowdhury, worked as a district magistrate. His mother was Umme Kabir Afia Chowdhury. His family originated from Gopairbagh , Chatkhil of Noakhali in present-day Bangladesh. When he studied English literature at the University of Dhaka in the early 1940s he was influenced by the writings of H. G. Wells, George Bernard Shaw and Bertrand Russell, among others. During the World War II, troubled by the Nazi atrocities, Kabir's faith in democracy, secularism and liberal thoughts leaned him into socialist ideology.

Chowdhury was educated at the University of Dhaka, University of Minnesota and University of Southern California.

== Career ==
Chowdhury has written extensively on world's famous writers and painters. He has also written extensively on peace and conflict resolution through discussion and has tried to promote these values by his work as a teacher and as an administrator. He taught at Dhaka College (Dhaka) and B. M. College, Barisal (as Principal) and few years at University of Dhaka as a professor of English. He has worked as the Secretary, Ministry of Education, Cultural Affairs & Sports, Government of Bangladesh before his voluntary retirement from government service. He was inducted as National Professor of Bangladesh in 1998.

Chowdhury was a member of the Presidium of the Bangladesh World Peace Council and headed the Bangladesh-Soviet Friendship Society for over a decade. He was the president of the Bangladesh Vidyasagar Society and chairman of the Advisory Council of Ekatturer Ghatak Dalal Nirmul Committee (Committee for Resisting the Killers and Collaborators of 1971). In all the above capacities he has significantly contributed to the dissemination of secular ideas and democratic values. His ideology is materialism. He has written extensively on anti-fundamentalism, religious fanaticism and communalism, and has stressed the need for developing broad human values and for realising the importance of cultural diversity, and the imperatives for developing a pluralistic society.

In his long career, Chowdhury spoke at many national and international meetings of writers and social activists on literature, socialism, secularism and democracy. He addressed gatherings in Germany, Russia, USA, Bulgaria, Angola, Japan, Pakistan and India. He had met Nelson Mandela, Yassir Arafat, Agostinho Neto and Kim Il Sung. In a conference of the World Federation of UN Associations held in Barcelona which he attended as the representative of Bangladesh UN Association (he was its chairman for several years), he worked alongside Nobel Prize-laureate Philip Noel-Baker and the pacifist Sean Mac Bride. Among some notable writers, he worked closely with Pakistan's Faiz Ahmed Faiz, India's Visam Sahni, Palestine's Mahmoud Darwish and USA's Edward Albee.

Chowdhury played a leading role in many movements in Bangladesh, especially in the anti-communal movement, movement to establish democracy, and in the movement to ensure the trial of those who had committed crimes against humanity and war crimes during the War of Liberation of Bangladesh in 1971.

Chowdhury authored, edited, compiled, and translated over 200 books. He wrote both in English and Bangla and also translated in those languages. He translated into Bangla the works of Ernest Hemingway, Guy de Maupassant, Anton Chekhov, August Strindberg, Henrik Ibsen, Samuel Beckett, Naguib Mahfouz, J. M. Coetzee, and José Saramago.

Chowdhury served as the president of Bangla Academy from 22 February 2009 until his death in office. He died of cardiac arrest on 13 December 2011 at his residence in Naya Paltan, Dhaka at the age of 89.

== Personal life ==
Chowdhury married Meher Kabir (1919–2018), an academic and litterateur, in 1945. They had three daughters - the eldest, Shaheen Mahbuba Kabir (d. 2021), was a professor of English department of Jahangirnagar University.

Chowdhury's notable siblings include actress Ferdousi Mazumder, educationist Munier Choudhury (1925–1971), columnist Shamsher Choudhury (d. 2012), language activist Nadera Begum (d. 2013) and the first Bengali Cadet to be awarded Sword of Honour at Pakistan Military Academy, Lt. Colonel Abdul Qayyum Chowdhury (d. 2013). Another sister, Rahela Banu, is married to Shawkat Hussain, a former professor of English at the University of Dhaka.

== Works ==
- Chekhover Galpa (Chekov's Stories, 1969)
- Samudrer Swad (Taste of the Sea, 1970)
- Great Gatsby (1971)
- The Grapes of Wrath (1989)
- Rupantar (The Metamorphosis (1990)
- Beowulf (1985)
- All the King's Men (1992)
- Girl with a Pearl Earring (2007)
- Galpa Upanyase Pratikriti Chitra (Portraits in Stories and Novels, 2007)

== Awards ==
- Independence Day Award (1997)
- National Professor of Bangladesh (1998)
- Ekushey Padak (1991)
- Bangla Academy Literary Award (1973)
- Mohammad Nasiruddin Literary Award (1986)
- William Carey Award (1994)
- Tagore Peace Award
