= Abdus Suttar Khan =

Bangladeshi scientist (1941–2008)

- Born: 1941; Khagatua, Nabinagar, Tipperah District, Bengal Presidency
- Died: 31 January 2008 (aged 67)
- Resting place: Lee Memorial Park, Fort Myers, Florida
- Education: Comilla Victoria College; University of Dhaka; University of Oxford
- Scientific career
- Workplaces: Florida State University, NASA, Alstom, United Technologies

Abdus Suttar Khan (Bengali: আব্দুর সত্তার খাঁন; c. 1941 – 31 January 2008) was a Bangladeshi scientist. He researched on aerospace for four decades with NASA, United Technology, and Alstom, a French power generation company. Khan invented more than forty different alloys for commercial application in space shuttles, jet engines, train engines and industrial gas turbines.

== Early life and education ==
Khan was born in c. 1941 to a Bengali family of Khans from the village of Khagatua in Nabinagar, Tipperah District, Bengal Presidency (now in Brahmanbaria District, Bangladesh). He attended Ratanpur High School and did his intermediate at Comilla Victoria College. After graduating at the top of his class from University of Dhaka with a Bachelor of Science (Honors) in 1962 and master's degree in chemistry in 1963, Khan joined the Chemistry department as a lecturer at the same university. In 1964, he accepted a scholarship to study at the University of Oxford and received his PhD degree in chemistry in 1968. Following his PhD, Khan returned to the Chemistry department of DU as an associate professor and worked there until 1973. That year, he left Bangladesh to conduct research in the field of materials engineering (alloys) in the United States.

== Professional work ==
During his career, Khan invented more than forty different alloys. These alloys are designed for the use in the area of high temperature, such as blades of gas turbine or jet engines. They are coated with environmentally resistant coatings to provide protection from oxidation and/or corrosion, high temperature (to prevent thermal fatigue), to provide wear resistance etc.

These have been commercially applied in space shuttles, advanced commercial jet engines, and US air force jet engines. These alloys made engines lighter, which enabled the aircraft to fly faster. Khan's work in Switzerland also involved alloys.

One of Khan's during work with US Military Technology he invented his most valuable and memorable invention, high strength nickel based alloys, were used for increased fuel efficiency in F-15 and F-16 fighter engines. Subsequently, these alloys were declared as 21st Century materials for advanced aircraft engines in the Advanced Manufacturing and Materials Magazine (Popular Science, June 1990).

== Commercial products developed ==
1. Nano-catalysts developed are used for in fuel flow path in advanced jet engines for high match propulsion.
2. Advanced abrasion resistant materials developed are used for increased fuel efficiencies of US AF fighter engines (Proprietary to United Technologies' Pratt & Whitney)
3. Corrosion & fatigue resistant coatings deposited by cathodic arc process is used in advanced commercial in Pratt & Whiney jet engines (Proprietary to United Technologies' Pratt & Whitney)
4. Electrodeposited wear resistant coatings developed is used in advanced GT24/26 industrial gas turbine engines by Alstom, Switzerland (Proprietary to Alstom, Switzerland)
5. Electrodeposited oxidation-corrosion resistant coatings used by Alstom, Switzerland in Alstom Power GT-11 industrial gas turbine engines (Proprietary to Alstom, Switzerland)

== Awards and achievements ==
For Khan's outstanding research and its application in aerospace, he received numerous prestigious awards from NASA, the US Air Force, United Technology, and Alstom. In addition to these achievements, Khan was a Chartered Scientist (ProfScientist) of the Royal Society of Chemistry (Great Britain, 2005), Elected Fellow of the Royal Society of Chemistry (Great Britain, 1996), and a member of the American Society of Metals.

Some of his important awards and recognitions include:

- The "1986 United Technologies Special Award" for contributing the development of high strength nickel-based alloys (known as Alloy Y) used for increased fuel efficiency of F-15 & F-16 fighter engines. The Alloy Y was highlighted in Advanced Manufacturing and Materials Magazine (AMM Magazine), 4 August 1986. Subsequently, the Alloy Y was declared as 21st Century Materials for advanced aircraft engines.
- "United Technologies Research Center Award of Excellence" for developing a unique manufacturing process for hydrocarbon catalysis for high-speed aircraft & missile propulsion (1994).
- The hydrocarbon fuel catalyst technology developed under NASA-Air Force contract was declared as enabling technology by NASA and US Air Force in 1992.
- "Pratt & Whitney's Special" Award for contribution to development of manufacturing technology for advanced surface protection coatings for use in jet engines (1993)

== Retired life ==
During his retired life, Khan was conducting research as an honorary professor at the Department of Mechanical Engineering at Florida State University. While researching there, he tried to establish a Center of Excellence in nanomaterials for research in the area of carbon nanotechnology for applications in materials science and biomaterial technology.

== Social achievements ==
Besides his scientific achievements, Khan was also involved in community services in the United States. Khan was the founder of the Bangladeshi Association of Florida and organised numerous Asian community events. In 1991, he raised $61,000 for Bangladeshi flood victims and donated these funds to the Red Cross. Khan also established a cooperative agreement between Dhaka University and Lamar University in Texas to train faculty members and graduate students of DU.
