= Ramendu Majumdar =

Bangladeshi actor

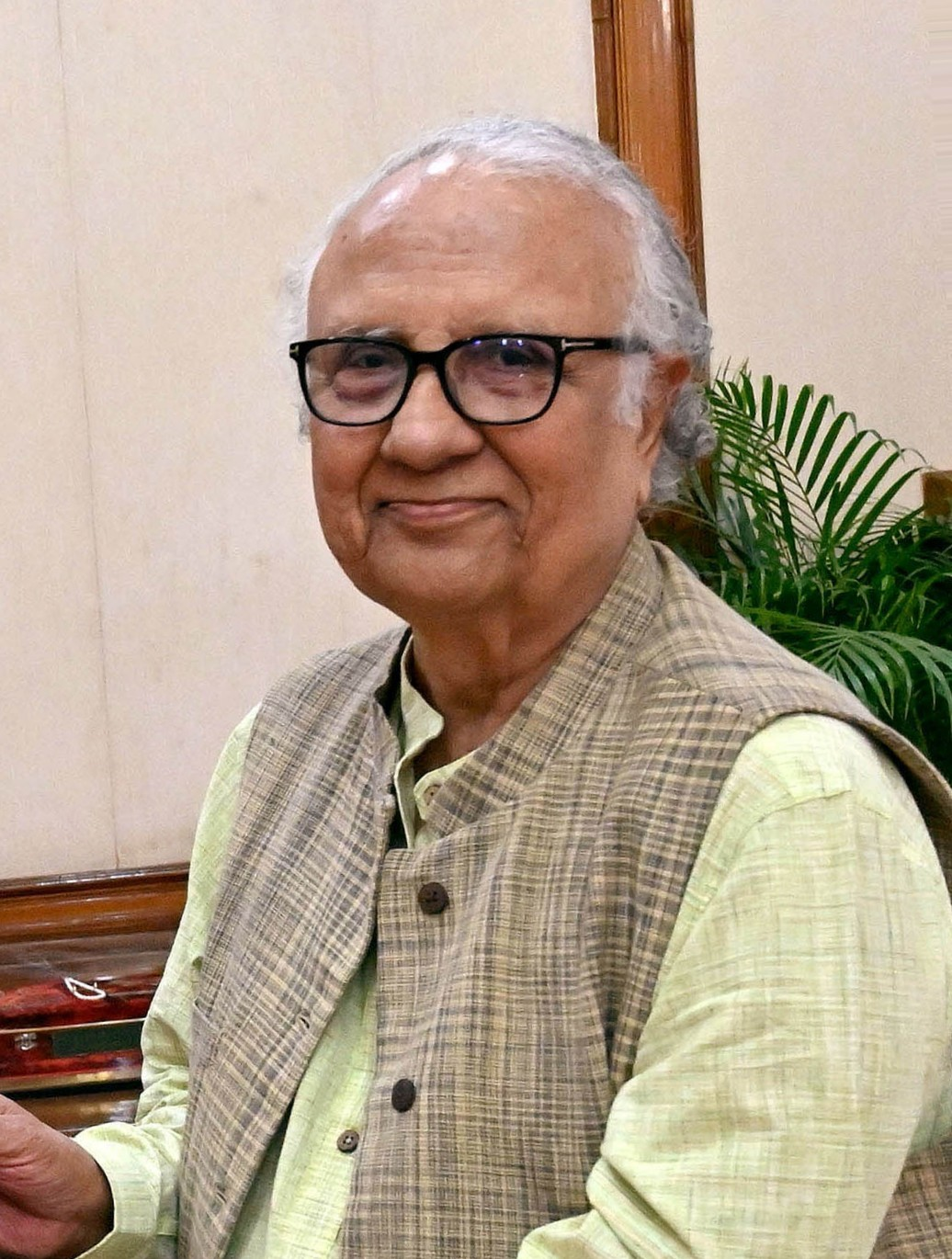
- Majumdar in 2023.
- Born: 9 August 1941 (age 84); Lakshmipur, Bengal Presidency, British India
- Education: MA (English)
- Alma mater: University of Dhaka
- Occupations: Actor, stage director, theater producer
- Spouse: Ferdousi Mazumder
- Children: Tropa Majumdar
- Awards: Ekushey Padak

Ramendu Majumdar (born 9 August 1941) is a Bangladeshi actor, stage director and theater producer. In 2011, he was elected president of the International Theatre Institute (ITI) for the second time. He was the second Asian to be elected to this position since ITI's establishment in 1948 as an initiative of UNESCO. He was awarded Ekushey Padak by the Government of Bangladesh in 2009.

== Early life and education ==
Majumdar was born on 9 August 1941 in Lakshmipur to Kuntal Krishna Majumdar and Leela Majumdar. He passed his matriculation from Lakshmipur Adarsha Samad Govt. High School and studied higher secondary at Comilla Victoria Government College. He studied English literature at the University of Dhaka.

== Career ==
Majumder co-founded the Bangladesh Centre of the ITI. In 2008, ITI elected him as the president. He was elected again for the same position in 2011. He is the chairman of the Dhaka Arts Centre.

Majumder owns a theater group named Theater. As of 2014, the group has produced total 43 plays. He is chairman and managing director of Expressions Ltd, an advertising firm. He founded this firm in 1993 after working for a firm, Bitopi Leo Burnett, for 21 years.

== Personal life ==
Majumdar is married to actress Ferdousi Mazumder. Their daughter, Tropa Majumdar, is also an actress.
