= Munier Choudhury =

Bangladeshi playwriter

- মুনীর চৌধুরী
- Born: 27 November 1925; Manikganj, Bengal, British India
- Died: 14 December 1971 (aged 46); Mohammadpur, Dhaka, Bangladesh
- Education: Aligarh Muslim University; University of Dhaka; Harvard University
- Known for: Inventor of Bengali input methods Martyred Intellectual
- Children: Ahmed; Ashfaque; Asif
- Relatives: Ferdousi Mazumder (sister); Kabir Chowdhury (brother); Ashfaque Munier (son)
- Awards: full list

Abu Naeem Mohammad Munier Choudhury (27 November 1925 – 14 December 1971) was a Bangladeshi educationist, linguist, playwright, literary critic and political dissident. He was a victim of the mass killing of Bangladeshi intellectuals in 1971.

== Early life and education ==
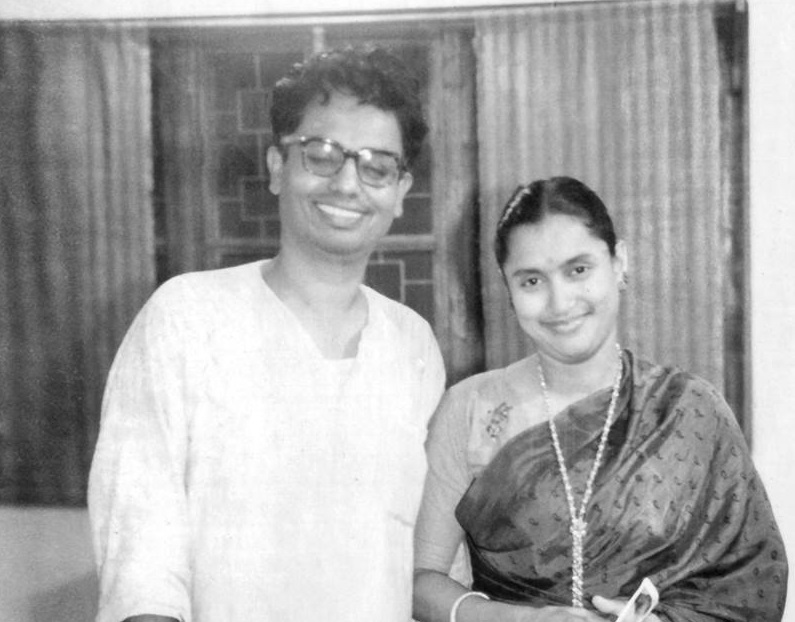
Chowdhury and his wife Lily

Choudhury's ancestors were originated from Chatkhil, Noakhali. He was born on 27 November 1925 in Manikganj. His father was Khan Bahadur Abdul Halim Chowdhury, a district magistrate and Aligarh Muslim University graduate. His mother was Umme Kabir Afia Begum (d. 2000). Because of his father's official assignment, Choudhury lived in Manikganj, Pirojpur and other parts of East Bengal. The family moved to Dhaka permanently in 1936. Then he grew up in the residence Darul Afia, named after her mother, among 14 siblings. He completed his matriculation from Dhaka Collegiate School in 1941 and intermediate examination from Aligarh Muslim University. He then studied English literature for his bachelor's degree (with honours) in 1946 and master's in 1947 at the University of Dhaka. He was expelled from Salimullah Hall, his residential dorm, because of his involvement in leftist politics. He was imprisoned for two years in 1952 for his participation in the Bengali language movement. While in jail, in 1954, he appeared at the master's examination in Bengali literature and stood first in the first class. Later, in 1958, he obtained his third master's degree in linguistics from Harvard University.

== Academic career ==
In 1947, Choudhury started his career in teaching at Brajalal College in Khulna. He moved to Jagannath College in Dhaka in 1950. He joined the University of Dhaka later that same year and taught both in the departments of English and Bengali until 1971. He became reader in 1962 and professor in 1970 and the dean of the faculty of arts in 1971.

== Political activity ==
Choudhury was associated with leftist politics and progressive cultural movements. In 1948, he attended the Communist Party Conference in Kolkata. He was elected Secretary of the "Progoti Lekhok O Shilpi Songho" (Progressive Writers and Artists Association). In 1952, he was arrested under the Preventive Detention Act for protesting against police repression and the killing of students on the Language Movement. In 1967, he protested the Pakistan government's ban on Tagore songs on radio and television. In the early 1950s, there was a movement in Pakistan to replace the Bengali language alphabet with the Arabic alphabet. As a linguist and writer, Choudhury protested this move to undermine the native language of East Pakistan. He actively participated in the non-co-operation movement during the early part of 1971 and renounced his award Sitara-e-Imtiaz, awarded by the government of Pakistan in 1966.

== Literary works ==
During his imprisonment in 1952–54, he wrote his symbolic drama on the historic language movement, Kabar (The Grave). He continued to write after being freed from prison, some of his notable works being Roktakto Prantor (1959; a play about the Third Battle of Panipat), Chithi (1966) and Polashi Barrack O Onyanno (1969). In 1965, Choudhury redesigned the keyboard of the Bangla typewriter, named Munier Optima Keyboard in collaboration with Remington typewriters of the then East Germany.

- Mir-Manas, 1965 – literary critique of Mir Mosharraf Hossain's literature
- Ektala-Dotala (first ever Bengali drama telecast on television), 1965
- Dandakaranya, 1966
- Tulanamulak Samalochana (Comparative critique), 1969
- Bangla Gadyariti (Bengali literary style), 1970

== Awards ==
- Bangla Academy Literary Award (1962)
- Daud Prize (1965)
- Sitara-i-Imtiaz (denounced, 1966)
- Independence Day Award (posthumously, 1980)
- Bangladesh Mujibnagar Staff Welfare Association Commemoration (posthumously, 1992)
- Language Activist and Political Prisoner Council Commemoration (posthumously, 1993)
- Liberation War Teachers' Council Commemoration (posthumously, 1996)
- Dhaka University Alumni Association Commemoration (posthumously, 2018)
- Dhaka Metropolitan Police Commemoration (posthumously, 2019)

== Death ==
After the Pakistani army crackdown in 1971 in the University of Dhaka area from which Chowdhury escaped like many, he moved to his parents' house, near Hatirpool. On 14 December 1971, he, along with a large number of Bengali intellectuals, educators, doctors and engineers, were kidnapped from their houses and later tortured and executed by the Pakistan Army and its Bengali collaborators Al-Badr and Al-Shams. According to a witness, Choudhury was last seen in Physical Training College in Mohammadpur Thana, Dhaka where his fingers were mutilated. His dead body could not be identified.

On 18 July 2013, Asif Munier Chowdhury Tonmoy, a son of Choudhury, made the statement before the International Crimes Tribunal-2. According to his testimony, Chowdhury Mueen-Uddin, a Muslim leader based in London, and Ashrafuz Zaman Khan, based in the United States, were directly involved in abduction, forced disappearance and killing of Choudhury. On 3 November, the same year, both of them were sentenced in absentia after the court found that they were involved in the abduction and murders of 18 people – nine Dhaka University teachers including Choudhury, six journalists and three physicians – in December 1971.

== Personal life ==
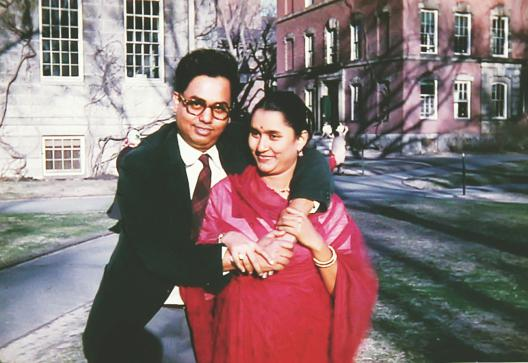
Choudhury with his wife Lily (1957)

Choudhury was married to Lily Choudhury (1928–2021). Together, they had three sons, Ahmed Munier, Ashfaque Munier (Mishuk) (1959-2011) and Asif Munier (born 1967). Ashfaq was a cinematographer. Ahmed is retired and previously worked for UN missions in Africa. Asif is a human rights activist and works in the development sector. He was a founder member of Projonmo Ekattor, a human rights group.

Choudhury's notable siblings include actress Ferdousi Mazumder, National Professor Kabir Chowdhury (1923–2011), columnist Shamsher Choudhury (d. 2012), language activist Nadera Begum (d. 2013) and the first Bengali Cadet to be awarded Sword of Honour at Pakistan Military Academy, Lt. Colonel Abdul Qayyum Chowdhury (died 2013). Another sister, Rahela Banu, is married to Shawkat Hussain, a former professor of English at the University of Dhaka.

== Legacy ==
Since 1989, a Bangladeshi theater troupe named Theatre has been conferring theater personalities for their contribution to the performing art form with Munier Chowdhury Shammanona award. Bangla Academy confers Shaheed Munier Choudhury Memorial Award to book publishing houses for the merit of quality of printing and aesthetic values. Central Road, the street in Dhaka where Choudhury lived, was renamed to Shaheed Munier Chowdhury Road. In 1991, on the 20th anniversary of Bangladesh's independence, the government issued a commemorative stamp featuring Choudhury.

On 27 November 2020, Google celebrated his 95th birthday with a Google Doodle.
