= Ananda Chandra Roy (born 1844) =

Bengali politician and lawyer

Ananda Chandra Roy (c. 1844–1935) was a Bengali politician and lawyer.

== Early life ==
Roy was born in about 1844 in Dhaka, Bengal Presidency, British India. He family were from Kanurgaon in Southern Bikrampur District and Brahmans from Varendra. His father, Gourasundar Ray, was the manager of James Wise's estate and indigo plantation. He studied at Pogose School.

== Career ==
In 1862, after Roy completed his pleadership examination he joined the court in Dhaka. He purchased a zamidari estate in Bhola from Lucas, an Armenian merchant. He founded the library in the old court of Dhaka. He founded Anandamoyee Girls' High School originally in Bikrampur but later shifted to Armanitola in Dhaka. He was a member of the East Bengal Landholders Association.

Roy was a member of the Dhaka Sadharan Sabha (Lit. Dacca People's Association) which campaigned for local authority over municipal services in Dhaka. Roy was elected ward commissioner in the first municipal election of Dhaka in 1884 from ward-5. He was subsequently elected chairman of Dhaka municipality and served till 1887. He was elected to the Bengal Legislative Council.

Roy was a trustee board member of Jagannath College and governing body of the University of Dhaka. He was a director of Dhakeswari Cotton Mills. He was opposed to the Partition of Bengal. He was the lawyer of The Comilla Shooting Case and Alipore Bomb Case. In 1908, he retired as a lawyer and joined the Indian National Congress. He was awarded the title of 'Ray Bahadur by the British Raj.

== Death ==
Roy died in 1935 in Dhaka. Ananda Chandra Road in Armanitola, Dhaka was named after him.
