= Meher Kabir =

- মেহের কবীর
- Born: 5 June 1919; Dinajpur, Bengal Presidency, British India
- Died: 13 October 2018 (aged 99); Dhaka, Bangladesh
- Occupation: Educator
- Spouse: Kabir Chowdhury (m. 1945; died 2011)

Meher Kabir (5 June 1919 – 13 October 2018) was a Bangladeshi academic and litterateur. She was awarded Begum Rokeya Padak by the Government of Bangladesh in 2010.

== Education and career ==
Kabir completed her matriculation in 1936. She then studied in Bethune College for intermediate exam, Scottish Churches College for the bachelor's degree and University College of Science and Technology for her master's. She was a PhD student under the supervision of Prafulla Chandra Ray.

In 1949, Kabir started her teaching career in chemistry at Comilla Victoria College. She served as a provost of Rokeya Hall of the University of Dhaka from 1963 to 1965.

Kabir served as the general secretary of Bangladesh Council for Child Welfare.

== Personal life ==
Meher was married to National Professor Kabir Chowdhury since 1945.
