= Ananda Chandra Roy (born 1863) =

Bengali zamidar and patron of education

- Roy Bahadur
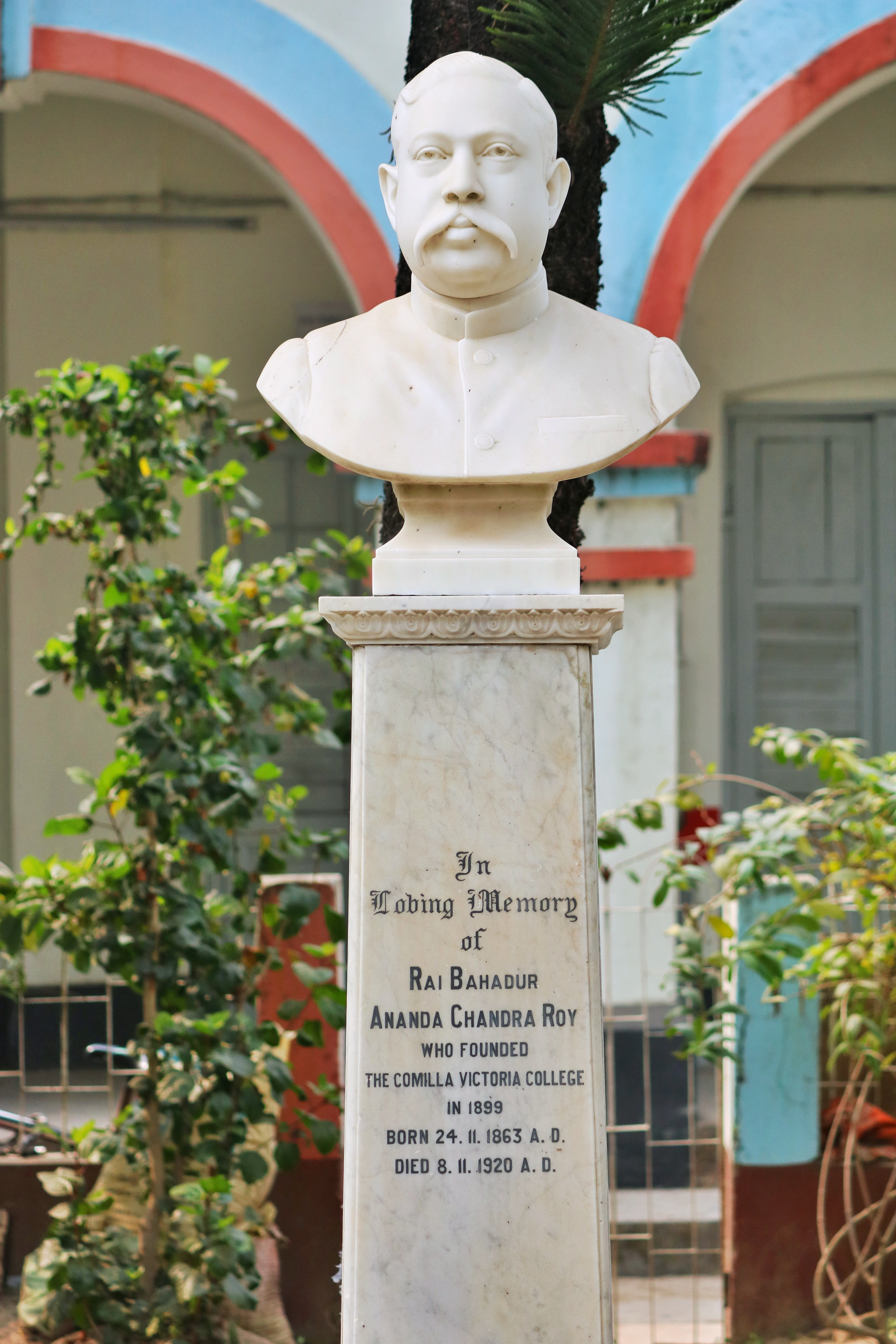
- Sculpture of Ananda Chandra Roy in Comilla Victoria Government College
- Born: 1863; Bengal Presidency, British India
- Died: 8 November 1920 (aged 56–57)
- Father: Ramdulal Roy
- Religion: Hinduism

Roy Bahadur Ananda Chandra Roy (Bengali: আনন্দ চন্দ্র রায়, romanized: Ananda Chandro Ray; 1863-1920) was a Bengali zamindar and patron of education in Comilla region of Bangladesh. He founded Comilla Victoria College, one of the oldest and prestigious colleges in Bangladesh.

== Early life ==
Roy was born in 1863 in Gobindapur, Humnabad, Laksam Upazila, Comilla District, Bengal Presidency, British Raj. His family were originally from Rajasthan eventually becoming zamindars through trading. His grandfather, Chatur Singh, served in the British Indian Army and was awarded land here by the British administration for his loyalty during the Indian Rebellion of 1857.

About the dynasty

He was the son of Ramdulal Ray, and he was the elder son of the family. His younger brother's name was Rai Bahadur Satischandra Ray (awarded with the title of RAI BAHADUR).

== Career ==
Roy took over his family zamindari after the death of his father. In 1866, he established Roy's Entrance School which was renamed to Victoria School in 1877 after Queen Victoria, Empress of India, in honor of her Golden Jubilee. The headmaster of the school was Dinesh Chandra Sen. He founded Comilla Victoria College in 1899. He had to rebuild Comilla Victoria College in 1902 after it burned down in a fire. He established a school and a post office in Gobindapur. He was awarded the title of Roy Bahadur by the British Raj in 1912.

== Death and legacy ==
Roy died on 8 November 1920 and was cremated in his family crematorium.

Roy built a mansion for his daughter, Labanyaprova, in Comilla which today is the residence of the Comilla District and Sessions Judge.
