= Sudhamoy Ghosh =

- Born: 13 January 1890; Charsologhar, Dhaka district, Bengal Presidency, British Raj (now in Bangladesh)
- Died: 15 August 1970 (aged 80); Calcutta (now Kolkata), West Bengal, India
- Education: University of Calcutta; University of Edinburgh
- Awards: 1915 Fellow of the Chemical Society (FCS); 1920 Fellow of the Royal Society of Edinburgh; 1926 Fellow of the Deutsche Pharmazeutische Gesellschaft; 1936 Fellow of the Royal Institute of Chemistry (FRIC); 1945 Fellow of the Indian National Science Academy (FNA); 1945 Member of the Order of the British Empire (MBE)
- Scientific career
- Fields: Biochemistry; Pharmacology; Natural products chemistry
- Workplaces: Calcutta School of Tropical Medicine
- Doctoral advisor: James Walker; Leonard Rogers (post-doc)

Sudhamoy Ghosh MBE, FNA, FRSE, FCS, FRIC (13 January 1890 – 15 August 1970) was an Indian biochemist, natural products chemist and pharmacologist.

== Life and career ==
Ghosh was born in the Dhaka district, then in the eastern region of the Bengal Presidency and now in Bangladesh. He was the son of Rasik Lal Ghosh, a civil servant, and his wife Kusum Kumari. After matriculating from high school and completing his intermediate degree in science from the Comilla Victoria Government College, he completed his bachelor's (1910) and master's (1912) degrees in chemistry from Dhaka College, then an affiliated college of the University of Calcutta. The same year he completed his MSc., Ghosh married Nirmala Guha (d. 1945), with whom he had two daughters, Indira and Manju.

In 1913, he received a scholarship to the University of Edinburgh to pursue doctoral studies; at Edinburgh, he conducted research under the guidance of James Walker on the optical rotation of certain sugars. After receiving his doctorate in 1915, he became a research chemist at the Calcutta Medical College under Leonard Rogers, a prominent researcher in tropical medicine. In December 1921, he joined the faculty of the newly established Calcutta School of Tropical Medicine as Professor and Head of Chemistry, holding the position until his retirement.

Over the course of his career, Ghosh investigated numerous Indian medicinal plants for their chemical properties. Among those were Boerhaavia diffusa, from which he isolated the alkaloid punarnavine, and Sida cordifolia, from which he and A. T. Dutta isolated ephedrine. He and his students also isolated several new alkaloids during their research, including kurchine and kurchicine from the bark of Holarrhena antidysentrica, saussurine from Saussurea lappa and tylophorine from Tylophora asthmatica.

Ghosh was twice selected (in 1929 and in 1942) as a nominator for the Nobel Prize in Physiology or Medicine; on both occasions, he unsuccessfully nominated Sir Upendranath Brahmachari for the prize.

Following his retirement in 1947, Ghosh was appointed to the West Bengal Public Service Commission, serving as a member until November 1950. He retired to Calcutta, where he died of a cerebral haemorrhage at his residence on Independence Day 1970, aged 80.

== Awards and honours ==
- Fellow of the Chemical Society (FCS; 1915)
- Fellow of the Royal Society of Edinburgh (FRSE; 1920)
- Fellow of the Deutsche Pharmazeutische Gesellschaft (1926)
- Minto Medal of the Calcutta School of Tropical Medicine (1931)
- Fellow of the Royal Institute of Chemistry (FRIC; 1936)
- Fellow of the Indian National Science Academy (FNA; 1945) (Note: Prior to 1970, the Indian National Science Academy was named the "National Institute of Sciences of India", and its fellows bore the post-nominal "FNI". The post-nominal became "FNA" in 1970 when the association adopted its present name.)
- Member of the Order of the British Empire (MBE; 1945 Birthday Honours)
