= Abu Sayeed M Ahmed =

Bangladeshi architect

- আবু সাঈদ এম আহমেদ
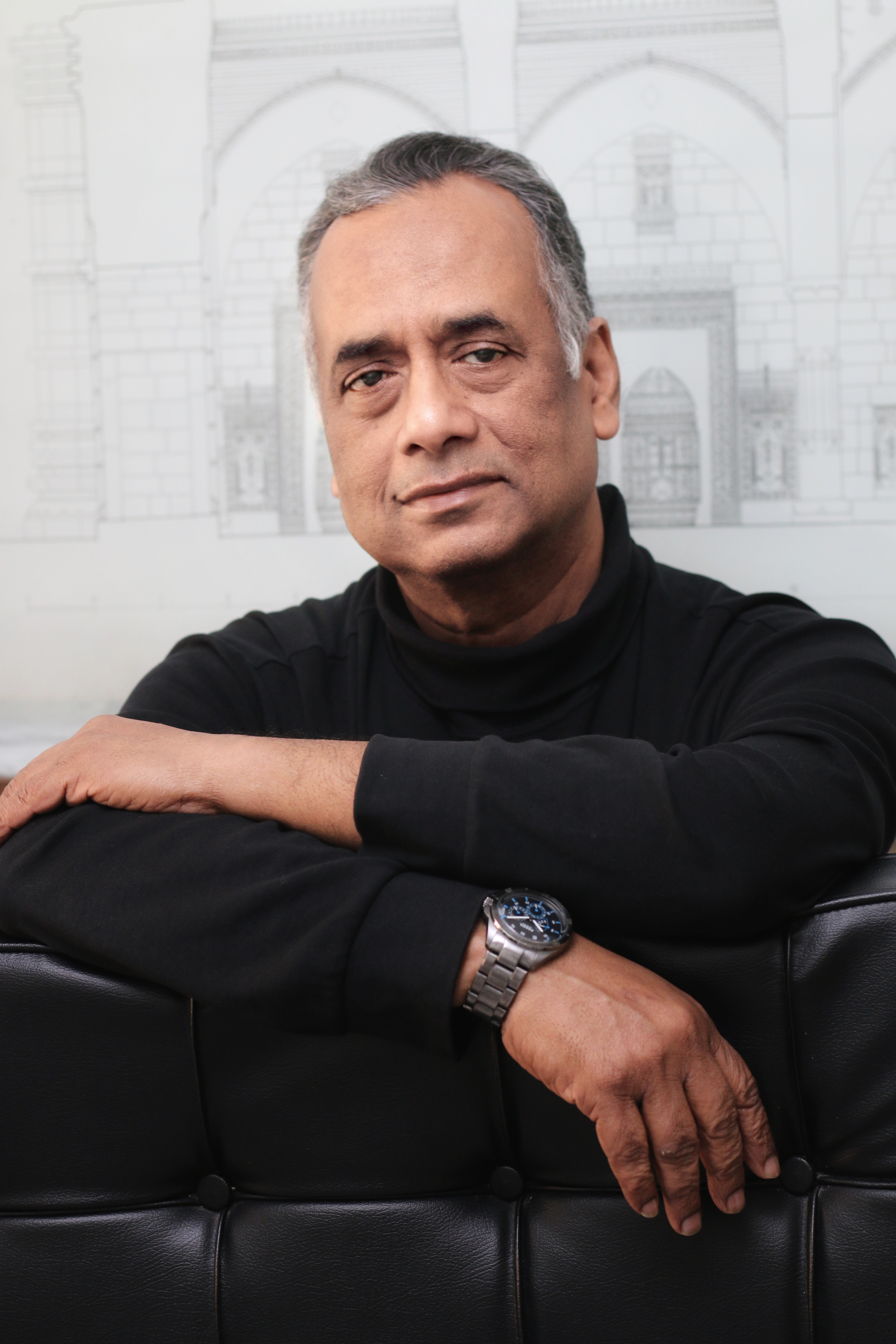
- Born: Comilla, Bangladesh
- Education: Bangladesh University of Engineering & Technology; Karlsruhe Institute of Technology
- Occupation: Architect
- Organization: Institute of Architects Bangladesh
- Known for: Presidents of Institute of Architects Bangladesh, President of The Architects Regional Council Asia (ARCASIA)

Abu Sayeed Mostaque Ahmed is an architect and architectural conservation specialist from Bangladesh.

== Career ==
Ahmed passed the SSC exam from Comilla Zilla School in 1974 and the HSC exam from Comilla Victoria College in 1976. Later, he was admitted to the architecture department of Bangladesh University of Engineering & Technology (BUET). He obtained a Bachelor of Architecture degree from there. After four years of service at the ECBL consultancy firm, he moved to Germany to do a master's degree. There he passed his M.Arch from Karlsruhe Institute of Technology and PhD from the same university.

Ahmed served as the president of the Institute of Architects Bangladesh (IAB) for its 21st Executive Council (2015–2016), and president of the Architects Regional Council of Asia (ARCASIA) for 2021–22.

Ahmed is the dean of the School of Environmental Science and Design and head of the Department of Architecture at the University of Asia Pacific (UAP).

== Notable conservation works ==
- Conservation and Adaptive reuse of Nimtali Deuri: first colonial building in Dhaka, Asiatic Society of Bangladesh
- Restoration of Baro Sarder Bari, Sonargaon, National Folk Art Museum, Ministry of Cultural Affairs of Bangladesh, funded by Yungoon Corporation Korea.
- Restoration of a Mughal mosque at Keranigonj, funded by Nasrul Hamid Foundation
- Restoration of Varendra Research Museum, Rajshahi University, funded by US Embassy Dhaka.
- Documentation of Brick Temple at Wari Vateshwar, Norsingdi, an excavation project of Jahangirnagar University.
- Restoration work of a Kachari Bari at Mithamoin, Kishorgonj, which was converted into Museum of Independence.
- Restoration of Dhaka Gate
- Restoration of Northbrook Hall

== Books ==
- Ahmed, Abu Sayeed M (1997), The Choto Sona Mosque-an Example of Early Islamic Architecture in Bengal, ifb-uni- Karlsruhe, Germany
- Ahmed, Abu Sayeed M (2002), (Ed) Sea Level Rise & Sustainable Coastal Management, UAP, Dhaka
- Ahmed, Abu Sayeed M (2006), Mosque Architecture in Bangladesh, UNESCO, Dhaka. This book was Awarded by UIA in the category "Best Publication" in 2018 at Baku Azerbaijan.
- Ahmed, Abu Sayeed M (2008) (Ed), IAB Centre Design Award, Institute of Architects Bangladesh, Dhaka
- Ahmed, Abu Sayeed M (2010), (Ed) ARCASIA Heritage, Volume I & II, Dhaka (a compilation of Heritage Architecture of 22 Asian Countries)
- Ahmed, Abu Sayeed M (2016), Unfolding the Past: Conservation of Baro Sarder Bari at Sonargaon, Dhaka
