= Kandirpar =

Coordinates: 23.4608°N 91.1816°E

Kandirpar is situated on Comilla, Bangladesh. It is considered the heart of the Cumilla district.

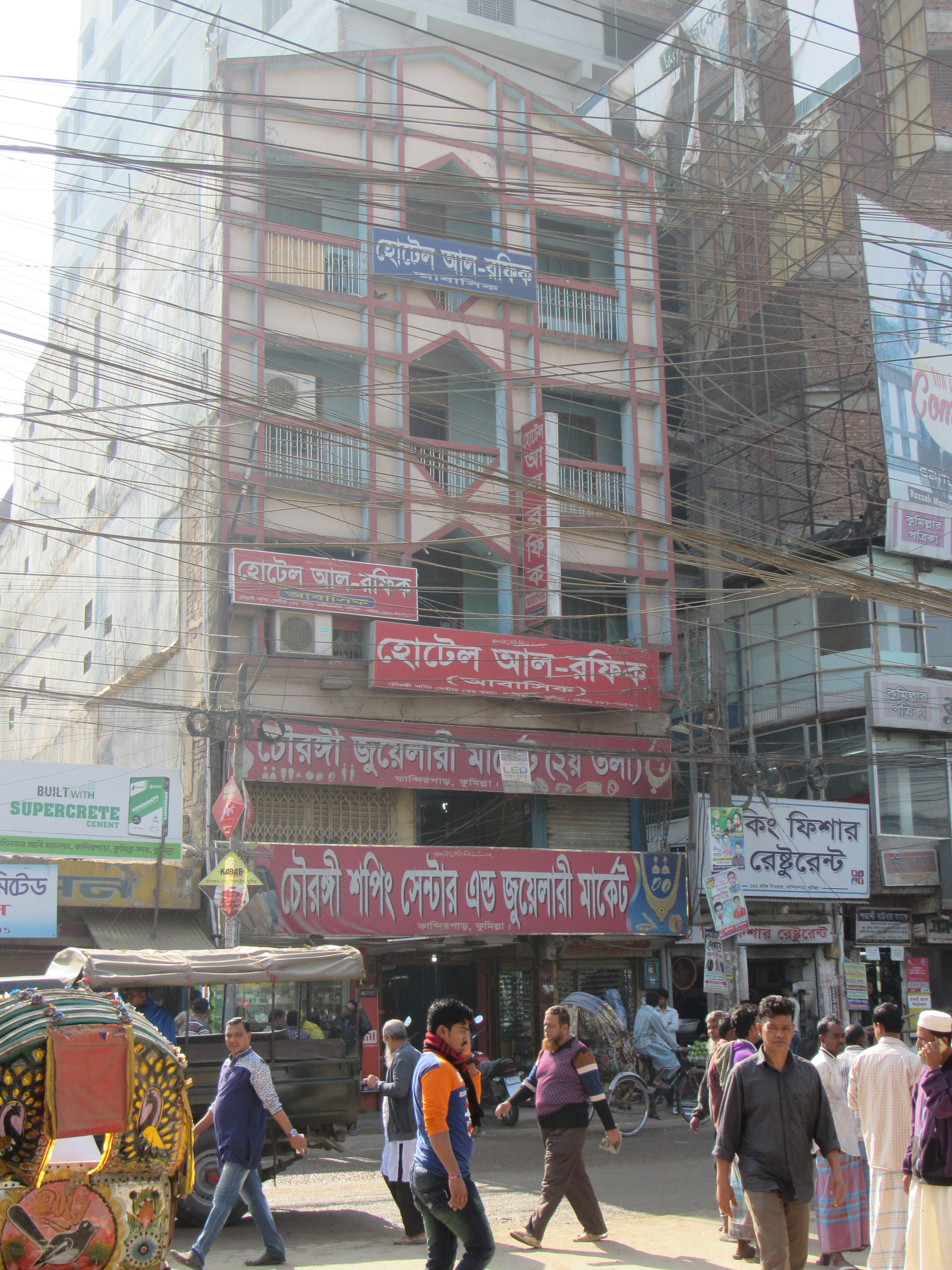
Shopping center in Kandirpar 2019

== See also ==
- Comilla
- Comilla Division
