= James Wise (civil surgeon) =

British medical doctor (1835–1886)

- Born: James Fawns Norton Wise; 1835
- Died: 1886 (aged 50–51)

James Fawns Norton Wise (known as James Wise; died 1886) was a British civil surgeon of Dhaka in 1860s. He was also a writer.

== Work ==
Wise was eager not only for medical science but also for history. He sent a considerable number of impressions of stone inscriptions for Blockmann's Contributions to the Geography and History of Bengal. When Alexander Cunningham came to Sonargaon and Vikramapura, he not only arranged boats and elephants for him, but also accompanied him in that visit. The erudition and companionship of Wise made the visit of Cunningham fruitful.

Wise wrote his first book "Notes on Races, Castes and Trades of Eastern Bengal", where he collected the material used in writing the book during his stay in Dhaka. Later on, in his retired life, he got the manuscript printed in 1883 from 'Her Majestry's printer Harrison and Sons' located in St Martin Lane in London. Recently, the Bangla translation of the book has been published with the title Purbabanger Bibhinna Jati, Varna O Peshar Bibaran.

Apart from this, two articles "Notes on Sonargaon" and "Notes on Bara Bhuiyans" of Wise had been published in the Journal of the Asiatic Society of Bengal in 1874.
