= Gaziul Hasan Khan =

- Education: Economics, Journalism
- Alma mater: University of Dhaka University of London
- Occupation: Journalist

Gaziul Hasan Khan (born 28 September 1946) is a Bangladeshi journalist and ex-diplomat with a long professional career in London. He is a former Chief Editor and managing director of the National News Agency Bangladesh Sangbad Sangstha. He was awarded the Ekushey Padak (second-highest national civilian award) in 2006 by the Government of Bangladesh for his contributions to journalism. He also served as a Minister in charge of Press and Information at the Embassy of Bangladesh in Washington DC, United States.

== Early life and education ==
Gaziul Hasan Khan was born on 28 September 1946 in Tipperah district, Bengal Province (now Comilla District, Bangladesh). He obtained an MA in Economics and Postgraduate Diploma in Journalism from the University of Dhaka. He was a resident student of the famous Salimullah Muslim Hall. Khan took an active role in the Bangladesh Liberation War in 1971 and also participated in the programmes of the "Bangladesh Revolutionary Radio Service" (Swadhin Bangla Betar Kendro) to bolster the struggle for independence.

== Career ==
Khan debuted as a staff reporter for Eastern News Agency (ENA), a now-defunct independent news service, in 1970, a year before the Bangladesh Liberation War. In 1976, he went to London with a Commonwealth scholarship to study journalism. He obtained a Higher Diploma in International Relations from the University of London. whilst working as a senior editor of 'World Times' newsmagazine (now defunct), published from London's Fleet Street from 1977 to 1979. During this period, Khan and some of his colleagues founded the Commonwealth Journalist Association (CJA). He was also a regular contributor to the BBC's overseas service during the late seventies and early eighties.

Khan established his own publishing house and a newsmagazine in London's East End in 1980. He converted the newsmagazine into a bilingual (Bengali and English) weekly newspaper titled "Deshbarta / Eastern News", and subsequently into "Deshbarta" (completely in Bengali). During this time, he was also the first Bangladeshi publisher to establish a Bengali-language press, including a complete printing outfit and computer typesetting facilities, in Brick Lane, the hub of the Bangladeshi community in London. For the first time in the history of the Bangladeshi immigrant community, Khan published a number of Bengali books, literary collections, magazines and children's reading materials from his publishing house in London.

Khan accepted a diplomatic assignment offered by the Government of Bangladesh in 1993 at its embassy in Washington DC, United States, as a Minister in charge of press and information. He also worked as a director of a human rights group, South Asia Watch, in New York City for two years (1997-1998). Khan returned to his journalistic roots in Bangladesh at the end of 1998, writing for the country's leading local newspapers as a columnist.

Khan was appointed the managing director and Chief Editor of Bangladesh Sangbad Sangstha in May 2003. His contract was terminated in November 2006 by the unelected caretaker government because of his opposition to restrictions on press freedom.

After his professional service with the BSS, Khan continued to contribute news analysis and columns to national newspapers in Bangladesh. In the meantime, he published several books, including "Palestine – a Long History of Struggle". These books were highly acclaimed by Bengali readers at home and abroad. Khan was awarded the Bangladesh national civilian award ('Ekushey Padak') by the Bangladesh government in 2006 for his contribution to the field of journalism at home and abroad.

Presently, Khan contributes to different newspaper as a columnist (freelance) and also works as an adviser to the UK chapter of the Dhaka University Alumni Association.

== Personal life ==
Khan resides both in Dhaka and London with his wife. He has two daughters and two sons, all of whom live and work in the U.K. His hobbies include Bengali classical music and literature.
