= Apel Mahmood =

Bangladeshi singer and freedom fighter

- আপেল মাহমুদ
- Born: Abu Sattar Mohammad Shah Zaman; 22 December 1947 (age 78); Daudkandi, Comilla
- Occupation: Singer
- Known for: Singer of Swadhin Bangla Betar Kendra
- Awards: Ekushey Padak (2005)

Apel Mahmood (born 22 December 1947) is a Bangladeshi singer and fighter. He is one of the performers of Swadhin Bangla Betar Kendra during the Independence War of Bangladesh in 1971 and best known for the song "Mora Ekti Phulke Bachabo Bole Juddho Kori". He was awarded Ekushey Padak, Bangladesh's second highest civilian award, in 2005 by the Government of Bangladesh for his contribution in music.

== Early life ==
Mahmood was born on 22 December 1947 in what is now Meghna Upazila, Comilla District, Bangladesh, to MA Rahman and Amina Rahman.

== Career ==
Mahmood was the deputy director general of programme at Bangladesh Betar. He was the vice-president of Jatiyatabadi Samajik Sangskritik Sangstha, the cultural wing of the Bangladesh Nationalist Party.

== Awards ==
- Ekushey Padak (2005)
