= Rafiqul Islam (activist) =

Bangladeshi-born Canadian language activist

- Born: 16 July 1950; Comilla, East Bengal, Dominion of Pakistan
- Died: 20 November 2013 (aged 63); Vancouver, Canada
- Education: University of Dhaka

Rafiqul Islam (16 July 1950 – 20 November 2013) was a Bangladeshi-born Canadian language activist. He played a major role in achieving recognition of February 21 as the International Mother Language Day, proclaimed by the General Conference of UNESCO in November 1999. He was awarded Independence Day Award posthumously by the government of Bangladesh in 2016. He was a member of Vancouver-based organization The Mother Language Lovers Of The World which was awarded Ekushey Padak in 2001 for the same cause.

== Death ==
Rafiqul Islam had lived in Canada for 18 years until he died of leukaemia on 20 November 2013 in Vancouver General Hospital in Canada.
