= Alfaz Uddin =

Bangladeshi politician (1932–2018)

Member of Bangladesh Parliament
- In office 18 February 1979 – 12 February 1982

Personal details
- Party: Bangladesh Nationalist Party

Alfaz Uddin (Bengali: আলফাজ উদ্দিন) was a Bangladesh Nationalist Party politician and a former member of parliament for Comilla-19.

== Career ==
Uddin was elected to parliament from Comilla-19 as a Bangladesh Nationalist Party candidate in 1979.

== Death ==
Uddin died on 15 July 2018.
