= Martyred Intellectuals Day =

Commemoration observed on 14 December in Bangladesh

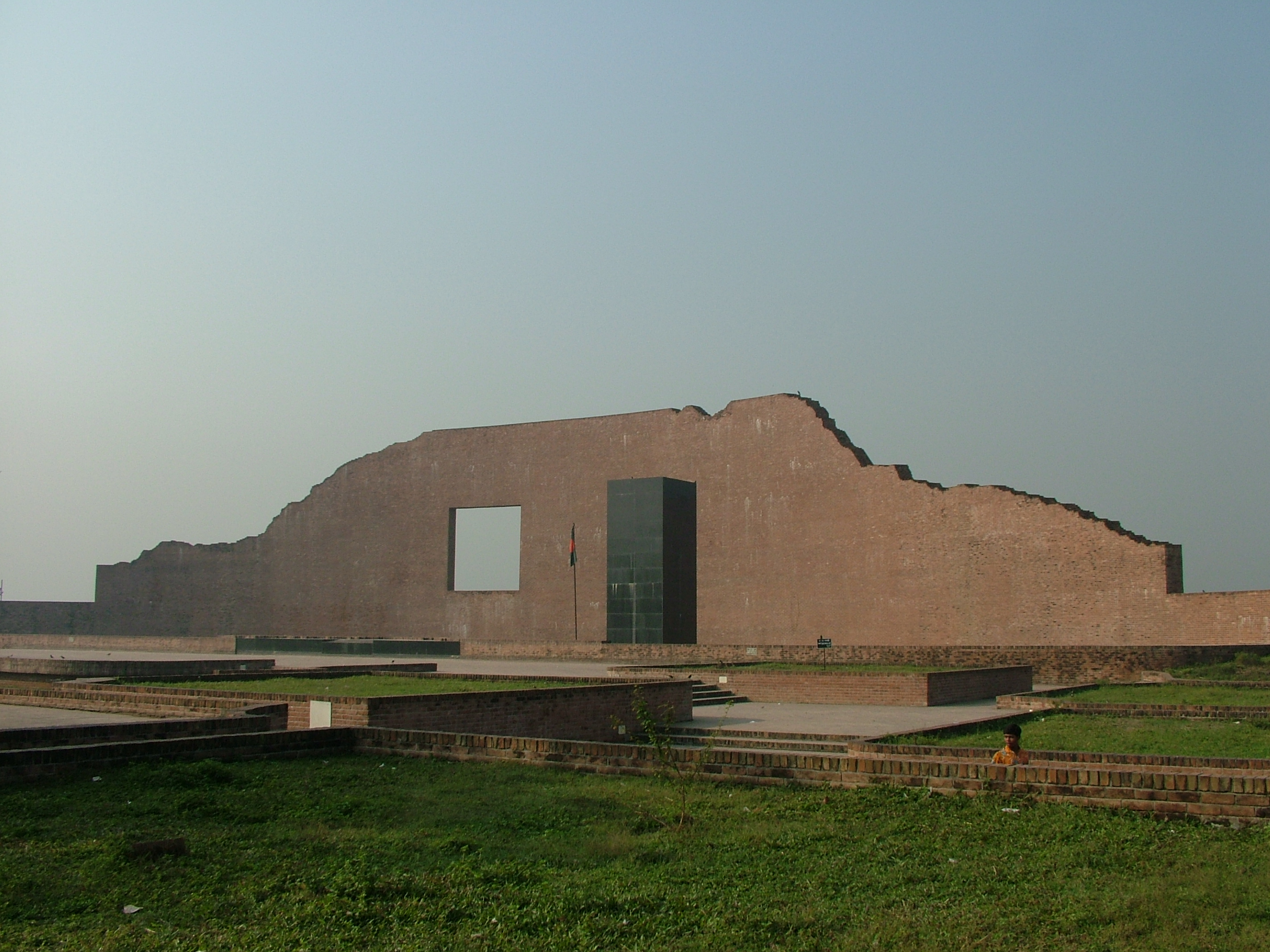
- Martyred Intellectuals Memorial at Rayer Bazaar, Dhaka
- Official name: Bengali: শহীদ বুদ্ধিজীবী দিবস Śôhīd Buddhijībī Dibôs
- Observed by: Bangladesh
- Significance: Commemoration of executions of Bengali intellectuals
- Date: 14 December
- Next time: 14 December 2026
- Frequency: Annual

Martyred Intellectuals Day (Bengali: শহীদ বুদ্ধিজীবী দিবস, romanized: Śôhīd Buddhijībī Dibôs) is observed on 14 December in Bangladesh to commemorate the large number of Bangladeshi intellectuals killed by Al-Badr, the collaborators of Pakistani forces during the Bangladesh Liberation War, particularly on 25 March and 14 December 1971. The killings were undertaken with the goal of annihilating the intellectual class of what was then East Pakistan. On 16 December, Bangladesh became independent through the surrender of Pakistani forces.

== History ==
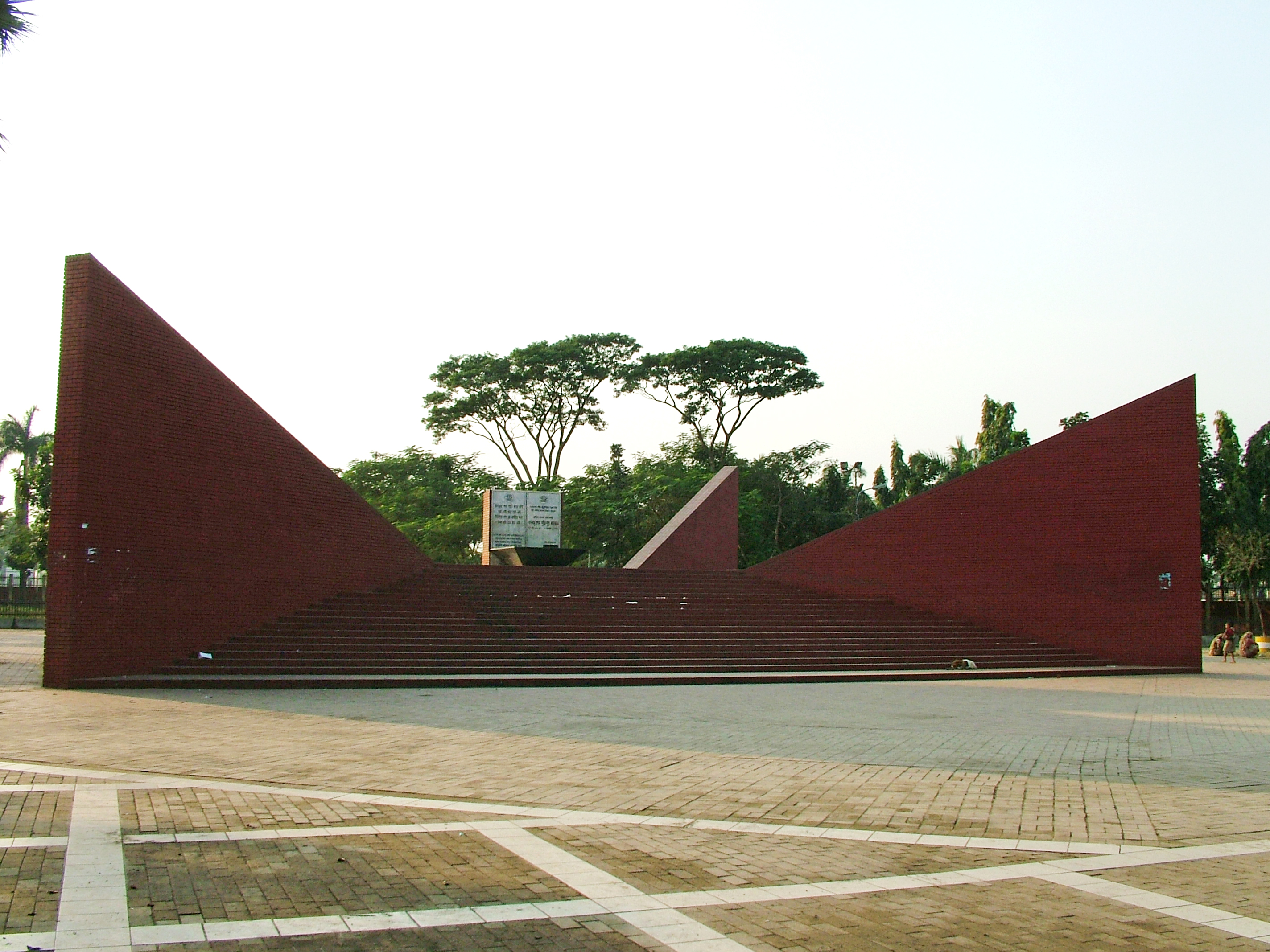
Mirpur Martyred Intellectuals Memorial and Graveyard

The Bangladesh Liberation War against the country West Pakistan began on 26 March 1971, grew into the Indo-Pakistani War of 1971, and ended with the victory of Bangladesh on 16 December 1971. On 14 December, sensing imminent defeat, Pakistani forces and their local collaborators— Al-Badr —abducted and killed front-line Bengali intellectuals and professionals in order to cripple the new nation intellectually. Renowned academics, teachers, intellectuals, doctors, engineers, journalists, and other eminent personalities were dragged out of their houses, blindfolded, and killed. Their bodies were dumped in Rayerbazar, Mirpur, and other killing grounds in Dhaka just two days ahead of the final victory of the war.

During the nine-month duration of the war, the Pakistani Army, with the assistance of local collaborators, systematically executed an estimated 991 teachers, 13 journalists, 49 physicians, 42 lawyers, and 16 writers, artists, and engineers. Even after the official ending of the war on 16 December, there were reports of killings being committed by either the armed Pakistani soldiers or by their collaborators. In one such incident, notable filmmaker Jahir Raihan was killed on 30 January 1972 in Mirpur allegedly by the armed Beharis. In memory of the people who were killed, 14 December is observed in Bangladesh as Shaheed Buddhijibi Dibôsh (Day of the Martyred Intellectuals).

Notable intellectuals who were killed during the time period of 25 March to 16 December 1971 in different parts of the country include Dhaka University professors Govinda Chandra Dev (philosophy), Munier Chowdhury (Bengali literature), Mufazzal Haider Chaudhury (Bengali literature), Anwar Pasha (Bengali literature), Abul Khair (history), Jyotirmoy Guhathakurta (English literature), Humayun Kabir (English literature), Rashidul Hasan (English literature), Ghyasuddin Ahmed, Sirajul Haque Khan, Faizul Mahi, Santosh Chandra Bhattacharyya and Saidul Hassan (physics), Rajshahi University professors Hobibur Rahman (mathematics), Sukhranjan Somaddar (Sanskrit), and Mir Abdul Quaiyum (psychology), as well as Mohammed Fazle Rabbee (cardiologist), AFM Alim Chowdhury (ophthalmologist), Shahidullah Kaiser (journalist), Nizamuddin Ahmed (journalist), Selina Parvin (journalist), Altaf Mahmud (lyricist and musician), Dhirendranath Datta (lawyer), Jahir Raihan (novelist, journalist, and film director), and Ranadaprasad Saha (philanthropist).

== Memorial ==
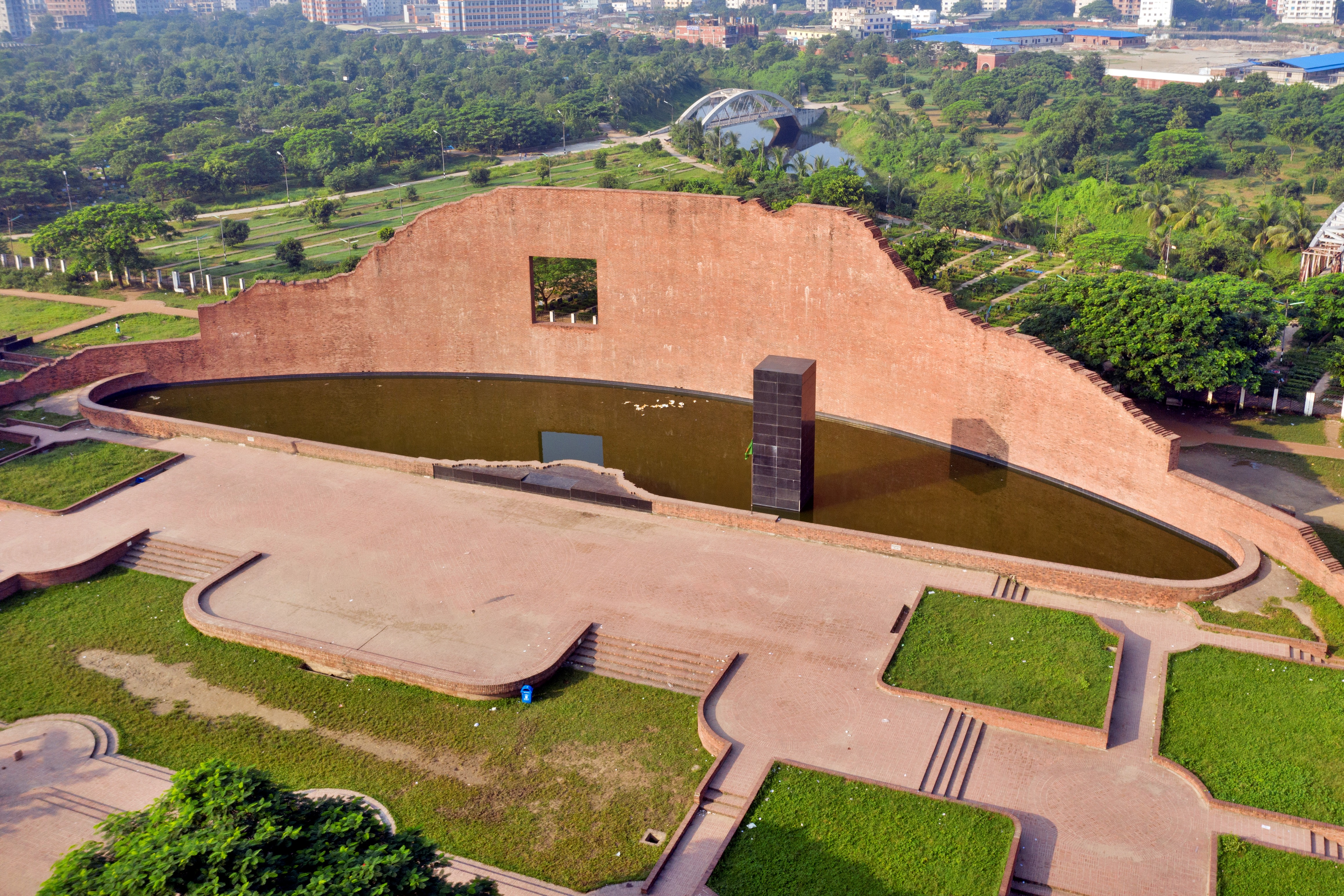
Rayerbazar Martyred Intellectuals Memorial

In memory of those killed, a memorial known as the Martyred Intellectuals Memorial (Badhya Bhumi Smriti Soudha) was built at Rayer Bazaar, Mohammadpur Thana in Dhaka, in 1996–99. The memorial was designed by architect Farid U Ahmed and Jami Al Shafi. The initial proposal for a memorial at Rayer Bazar was brought forward by Projonmo 71 (organisation of the children of the martyrs of liberation war), who also laid a temporary foundation stone in 1991.

== See also ==
- Operation Searchlight
- Bangladesh genocide
- Bangladesh Genocide Remembrance Day
- Rape during the Bangladesh Liberation War
