= Ashrafuz Zaman Khan =

Al-Badr leader

Ashrafuzzaman Khan
- আশরাফুজ্জামান খান
- Born: 28 February 1948 (age 77); Faridpur, East Bengal, Pakistan
- Known for: 1971 killing of Bengali intellectuals; Head of Islamic Circle of North America (ICNA), Queens, New York branch
- Criminal penalty: Death sentence given in absentia

Ashrafuzzaman Khan (Bengali: আশরাফুজ্জামান খান, Urdu: اشرف زمان خان; born 28 February 1948) is a Pakistani Bengali cleric and a convicted mastermind of 1971 killing of Bengali intellectuals. In 1971, he was a member of the Central Committee of the Islami Chhatra Sangha.

After the surrender of Pakistan to India, and the subsequent liberation of Bangladesh, he went to Pakistan and worked for Radio Pakistan. Later, he migrated to America. He was president of the Imams of America association and later headed the Queens, New York branch of the ICNA. He was sentenced to death in absentia by the International Crimes Tribunal (Bangladesh) for the murders of 18 Bengali intellectuals during the last days of the 1971 war in Bangladesh.

== Activities as a commander of Al Badr ==
Khan shot to death seven teachers of Dhaka University in the killing zones at Mirpur. Mofizzuddin, who drove the vehicle that carried those victims to Mirpur, clearly identified Ashrafuzzaman Khan as the "chief killer" of the intellectuals.

== After 1971 War ==
After the liberation of Bangladesh, Khan's personal diary was recovered from his residence, 350 East Nakhalpara Road. Two pages of his diary registered names and residential addresses of 19 teachers as well as the name of the medical officer of Dhaka University. Of those 20 persons, 8 were missing on 14 December: Munier Chowdhury (Bengali), Dr. Abul Khair (History), Ghiasuddin Ahmed (History), Rashidul Hasan (English), Dr. Faizul Mohi (IE R), and Dr. Murtaza (Medical Officer).

Mofizuddin confessed that Khan had shot all of them. As per Mofizuddin's description, the decomposed bodies of those unfortunate teachers were recovered from the swamps of Rayer Bazar and the mass grave at Shiyal Bari at Mirpur. There were also other names in the diary including Dr. Wakil Ahmed (Bengali), Dr. Nilima Ibrahim (Bengali), Dr. Latif (IE R), Dr. Maniruzzaman (Geography), K.M. Saaduddin (Sociology), AMM Shahidullah (Math), Dr. Sirajul Islam (Islamic History), Dr. Akhtar Ahmed (Education), Zahirul Huq (Psychology), Ahsanul Huq (English), Serajul Islam Chowdbury (English), and Kabir Chowdhury (English).

Another page of his diary recorded the names of 16 collaborationist teachers at Dhaka University. Apart from that there were also names of Chowdbury Moinuddin, the chief of operation for elimination of the intelligentsia, and Shawkat Imran, a member of the central Al-Badr command and head of Dhaka Al-Badr forces. The diary contained names and addresses of several other prominent Bengalis, all of whom lost their lives at the hands of Al-Badr forces. On a small piece of paper the name of the member finance of the Pakistan Jute Board, Abdul Khalek, was written down. On 9 December 1971, the Al-Badr forces kidnapped Mr. Khalek from his office. They demanded Taka 10,000 as ransom. They saw Mrs. Khalek for ransom money. But at that time she was unable to pay the kidnappers more than 450 taka. She promised that she would give them the rest of the money later and begged them her husband's life. But Khalek never came back. Khan was also implicated in the murder of some journalists. Khan kidnapped the shift-in-charge of the Purbadesh, and the literary editor, Golam Mustafa.

== War crimes trial ==
=== Arrest warrant ===
On 25 April 2013, the International Crimes Tribunal submitted formal charges against Ashrafuzzaman Khan on the charge of killing 18 intellectuals towards the end of the Bangladesh liberation war 1971, as the "chief executor" of the Al-Badr force. A total of 16 charges of crimes against humanity have been brought against him under five categories, and an arrest warrant against him has been issued by the tribunal.

=== Verdict ===
On 3 November 2013, International war crimes tribunal sentenced Ashrafuzzaman Khan to death after the tribunal found him guilty of torture and murder of 18 intellectuals including nine Dhaka University teachers, six journalists and three doctors during 1971 Liberation war of Bangladesh. According to International Crimes Tribunal, the prosecution proved all the charges against Khan beyond doubt. The tribunal found that Khan and his ally, Chowdhury Mueen-uddin, at times, carried out the murders, sometimes they instigated and encouraged them and the two had complete control over the Al Badr during the 1971 War.

=== List of victims killed by Ashrafuzzaman Khan and Chowdhury Mueen-uddin ===
A court found Khan and Mueen-uddin guilty of the murders of 18 Bengali intellectuals: Dhaka University Professors Ghyasuddin Ahmed, Rashidul Hasan, Anwar Pasha, Faizul Mahi, famous playwright and Professor Munier Chowdhury, Mufazzal Haider Chaudhury, Dr. Abul Khair, Dr. Santosh Chandra Bhattacharyya and Dr. Sirajul Haque Khan, Professor of Cardiology Mohammed Fazle Rabbee, eminent eye specialist AFM Alim Chowdhury, physician Mohammad Martuza, novelist/journalist Shahidullah Kaiser, journalist/poet Selina Parvin, journalists Serajuddin Hossain, Syed Nazmul Haque, ANM Golam Mostafa, and Nizamuddin Ahmed, between 10 and 15 December 1971.

== See also ==
- Razakars (Pakistan)
