= Mufazzal Haider Chaudhury =

Bangladeshi writer (1926–1971)

- মোফাজ্জল হায়দার চৌধুরী
- Born: 1926; Khalishpur, Noakhali district, Bengal Presidency, British India
- Died: 14 December 1971 (aged 44–45)
- Education: University of Dacca
- Spouse: Syeda Tahmina Monowara Nurunnahar (m. 1956)

Mufazzal Haider Chaudhury (1926 – 14 December 1971) was a prominent Bengali essayist, prized scholar of Bengali literature, educator and linguist of the Bengali language.

== Biography ==
Chaudhury was born in Khalishpur, Noakhali district, British India, (now in Begumganj Upazila, Bangladesh) in 1926. (Note: Sources agree that Chaudhury was born in 1926, but they vary regarding the day. Who's Who in Bangladesh Art Culture Literature (1901-1991) states that Chaudhury was born on 22 July. Banglapedia says 23 July. Wakil Ahmed wrote in a December 1971 obituary that Chaudhury was born on 1 December.) His father was Bazlur Rahman Chaudhury, and his mother was Mahfuza Khatun. He was the eldest of four brothers and sisters. His father died when Chaudhury was young.

Chaudhury matriculated from Ahmadia High School in 1942, securing fourth place in the exams. He stood first in the intermediate examination in arts at Dacca College in 1944. He stood first again, with record marks, when he earned a BA (honours) in Bengali at Visva-Bharati College under Calcutta University in 1946. Chaudhury continued at Visva-Bharati for two years as a research assistant to Professor Probodh Chandra Sen, a specialist in Bengali metre. In 1948, he passed the college's Loka Siksha Samsad (a type of non-formal education) examination and received a 'Sahitya Bharati' diploma.

Chaudhury moved to Dacca in 1948, where he worked as a scriptwriter for Pakistan Radio. Next he was a lecturer at Jagannath College, and also taught part time at St. Gregory's College. He earned an MA in Bengali from the University of Dacca in 1953, again standing first in his class.

Chaudhury joined the University of Dacca as a lecturer in 1955. On 20 May 1956, he married Syeda Tahmina Monowara Nurunnahar. They went to England in 1957 on a British Council Fellowship. He started a PhD in linguistics at the School of Oriental and African Studies, but did not get along with his advisor, and abandoned the work after two years. When they returned to East Pakistan, he resumed his position at the University of Dacca.

=== Death ===
Chaudhury was one of the leading Bengali intellectuals who were killed by collaborators of Pakistan Army on 14 December, two days before the end of the Bangladesh Liberation War.

On 14 December, which is observed as Martyred Intellectuals Day, a group of Al-Badr people took away the eminent intellectual from his house. His wife, Dolly Chaudhury, recognized one of the Al-Badr militants when the cover that hid the assassin's face was pulled by her husband. The person was Chowdhury Mueen-Uddin.

On 3 November 2013, Chowdhury Mueen-Uddin, a Muslim leader based in London, and Ashrafuz Zaman Khan, based in the US, were sentenced in absentia after the court found that they were involved in the abduction and murders of 18 people – nine Dhaka University teachers including Chaudhury, six journalists, and three physicians – in December 1971.

== See also ==
- 1971 Bangladesh atrocities
