= Mohammad Martuza =

- মোহাম্মদ মরতুজা
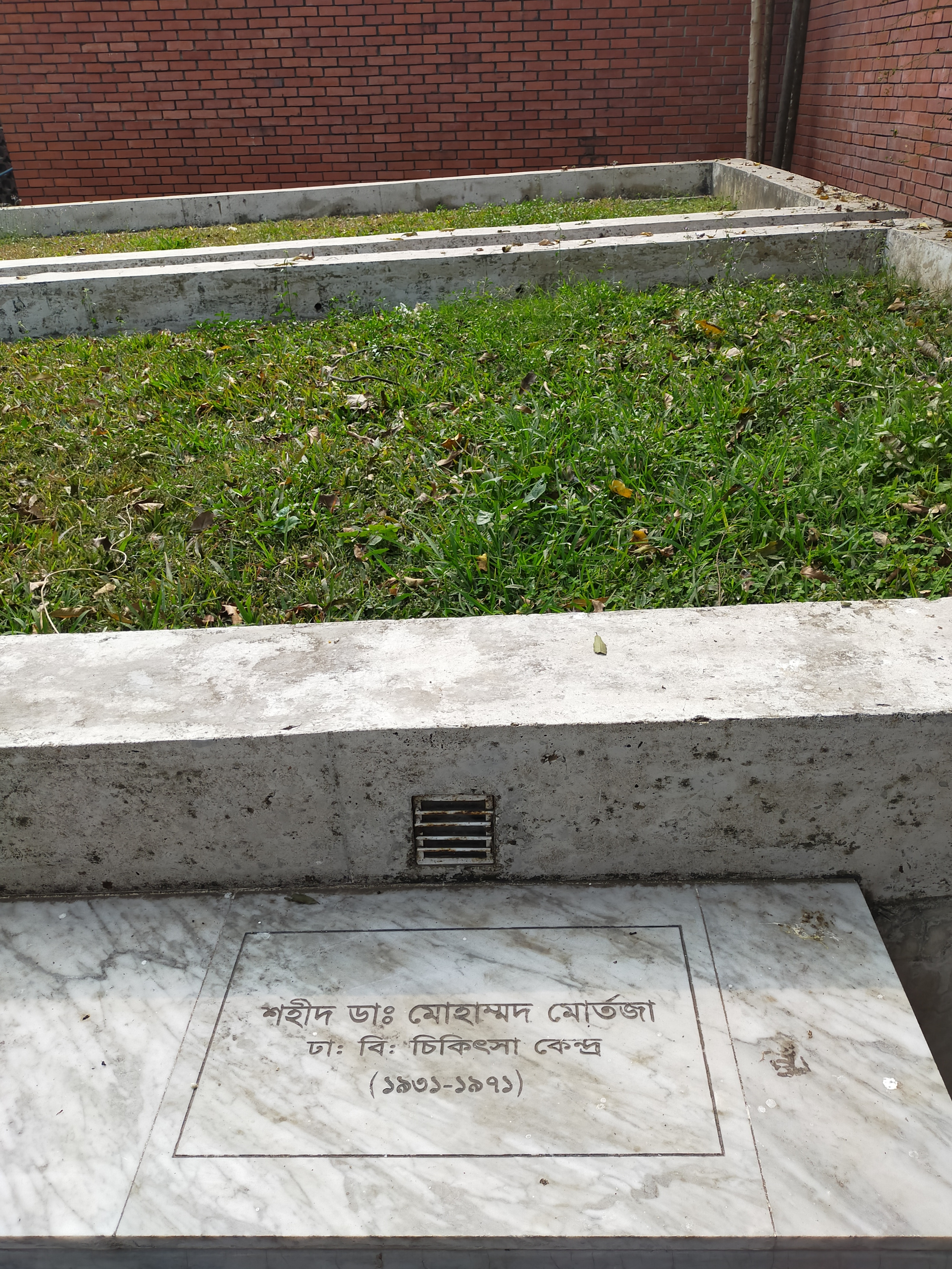
- Grave of Dr. Mohammad Martuza by the side of Dhaka University central mosque
- Pronunciation: Mōhām'mada Maratujā
- Born: 1 April 1931; 24 Parganas, West Bengal, British Raj
- Died: 14 December 1971; Dacca, East Pakistan, Pakistan
- Resting place: Dhaka University Central Mosque
- Monuments: Bangladesh Post Office Stamps

Mohammad Martuza (Bengali: মোহাম্মদ মুর্তজা; 1 April 1931 – 14 December 1971) was a Bengali physician, who was killed during the 1971 liberation war of Bangladesh. He is considered a martyr in Bangladesh.

== Early life ==
Mortuza was born on 1 April 1931 in 24 Parganas, West Bengal, British Raj. He graduated from Baliganj Government High School in 1946 and from Kolkata Presidency College in 1948. He started his medical education in Kolkata Medical College. After the Partition of India he moved with his family to Arangghata, Daulatpur thana, Khulna, East Bengal, Pakistan. He completed his MBBS from Dhaka Medical College in 1954. Martuza joined the Dhaka Medical Centre as a medical officer in 1955 after completing his schooling.

== Career ==
Martuza joined Dhaka University in 1955 as a medical officer. He was involved in left wing politics. He helped publish Gana-Shakti, edited by Badruddin Umar, where he had his own column titled Deshe Deshe Mukti Juddha. He also wrote many books. His book Jana Sankhya O Sampad won the National Bank Literary Award in 1964. He provided medical treatment and financial help to members of Mukti Bahini during Bangladesh Liberation war.

== Death ==
He was picked up on 14 December by a group of Al Badrs from his university residence. He was taken blindfolded with a ‘orna’ of his beloved little daughter Miti.

His body was recovered from a mass grave in Mirpur thana on 3 January 1972 after the end of the war. On 14 December 1991, the Bangladesh Post Office released commemoration postal stamp with his name.

On 3 November 2013, Chowdhury Mueen-Uddin, a Muslim leader based in London, and Ashrafuz Zaman Khan, based in the US, were sentenced in absentia after the court found that they were involved in the abduction and murders of 18 people – nine Dhaka University teachers, six journalists and three physicians including Dr. Martuza – in December 1971.

== Important works ==
Mortaza was a dedicated communist writer. His notable works are:

- Chikita Shastrer Kahini
- Prachin Vijnaner Kahini
- Hunaner Krisak Andolan
- Pak-Bharater Yudher Tatparya
- Jana Sankhya o Sampad
- Shanti na Shakti.

== See also ==
- 1971 Bangladesh atrocities
