= Serajuddin Hossain =

Bengali journalist

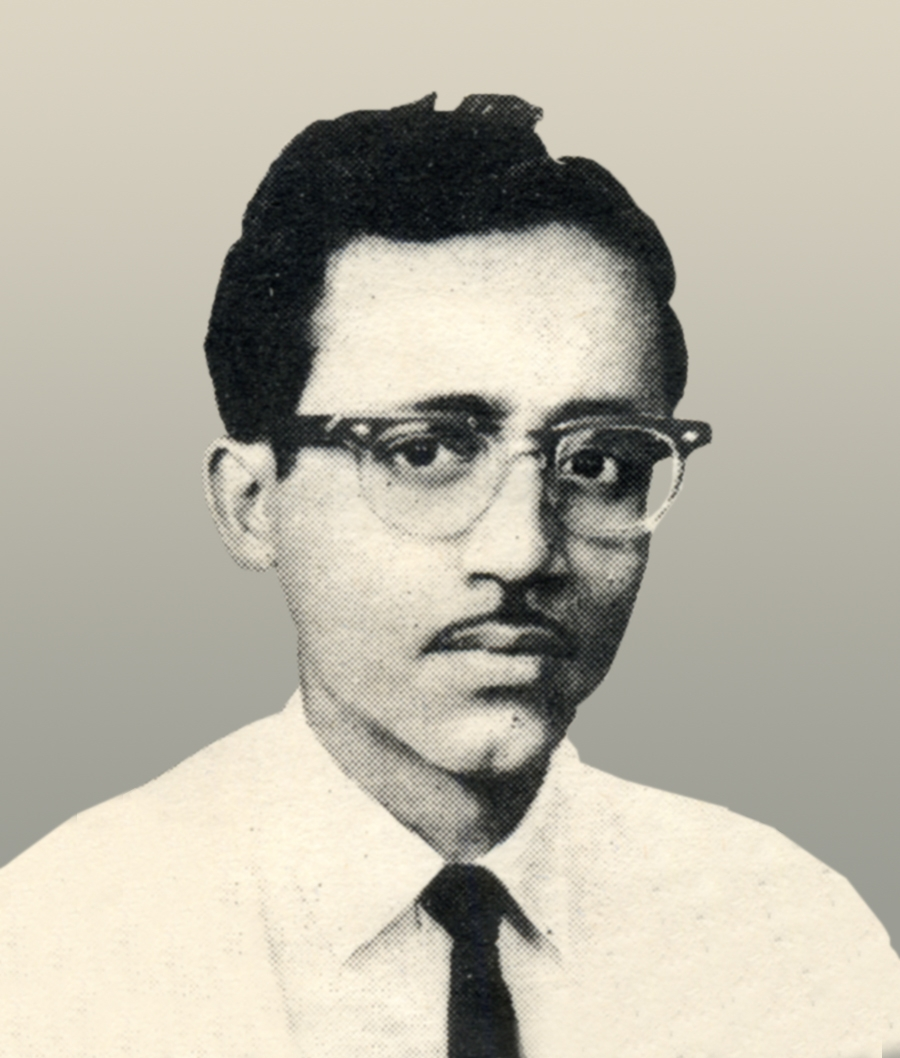
- Serajuddin Hossain
- Born: 1 March 1929; Sharushuna, Magura District, East Bengal, British Raj
- Died: 10 December 1971 (aged 42); Dhaka, Pakistan
- Occupation: Journalist
- Known for: Journalism
- Spouse: Nurjahan Begum

Serajuddin Hossain (1 March 1929 – 10 December 1971) was a journalist from East Pakistan. He was the news and executive editor of The Daily Ittefaq. He was captured from his residence by the Pakistan army with the help of Al-Badr and Razakars. He was not only a prominent journalist, but was also considered to be a good writer and translator. He was very close to Sheikh Mujibur Rahman. He was the first to introduce investigative reporting into Bangla newspaper. During the Bangladesh Liberation War of 1971, the country was occupied by the Pakistan Army. During this time, Serajuddin Hossain wrote in the newspaper on behalf of the liberation war, and secretly helped the freedom fighters.

== Early life ==
Serajuddin Hossain was born in the village Sharushuna, in the district Magura. His father was Maulana Mazharul Haque and his mother was Ashrafunnessa. He was third of four siblings. His elder sister was Anowara Begum, and his elder brother Sharafuddin Hossain. His younger sister, was Lutfunnessa. Serajuddin Hossain lost his father when he was three years old. After his father died, the family moved to Jessore City to the home of his uncle, who was the headmaster of Jessore Zilla School. Serajuddin and his brother started studying in this school. He passed the matriculation examination from Jhikor Gacha High School in 1943, and received his I.A. from Jessore Madhusudan College in 1947, and received his B.A. from Kolkata's Islamia College (now Maulana Azad College).

== Marriage and family ==
In 1949, Hossain married Nurjahan Begum, the sister of his college friend Shamsuddin Molla, who was to become a politician. Hossain and Nurjahan Siraji had eight sons: Shameem Reza Noor, Shaheen Reza Noor, Fahim Reza Noor, Nasim Reza Noor, Saleem Reza Noor, Shaheed Reza Noor, Zaheed Reza Noor and Tawheed Reza Noor.

== Life as a journalist ==
When he was a B.A. student, he became an apprentice journalist at the Daily Azad, a Bengali newspaper published from Kolkata. After a short time, he was promoted to sub-editor. When the Daily Azad moved from Kolkata to Dhaka, he was appointed as the assistant news editor and eventually was promoted to be a news editor. As a news editor of Daily Azad, he played a large role in the Language Movement of Bangladesh. In 1954, during a provincial election, Serajuddin Hossain supported the Jukto Front (United Front). As editor of the Daily Azad, Moulana Akram Khan, asked him to publish a report which would disclose that the bond between the leaders and parties of the Jukto Front had broken. A press release from Jukto Front said that the Jukto Front still existed. As an honest journalist, Serajuddin Hossain published a report which was based on Jukto Front's press release. The very next day Moulana Akraham Khan sacked him.

After that time, he worked as a junior editor of Franklin Publications. On 14 December 1954, he was hired as a news editor of the Daily Ittefaq. Serajuddin Hossain was a political journalist, but his work also spread over a number of other subjects. One of the subjects was investigative journalism. His brave work helped to save many kidnapped children, giving him worldwide recognition. During the 1960s, several children were being kidnapped. Serajuddin Hossain wanted to establish the fact that it was an organised crime, a single group of many criminals. Through his efforts, 72 children were saved. For that achievement he was nominated as the Best Journalist of International Press Institute.

Hossain was a trade unionist as well, and was elected as the president of the East Pakistan Journalism Union for two terms.

Hossain agreed with Huseyn Shaheed Suhrawardy and Sheikh Mujibur Rahman's political point of view. He was a theoretician of the Bengali Nationalist Movement.

In 1966, Ittefaq was banned by president Ayub Khan. Hossain then joined the news organisation, P.P.I, as the bureau chief. When Ittefaq was restarted in 1969, he returned to his old post as Ittefaq's news editor. From 1969 to 1971, he wrote political propaganda against Ayub Khan, thereby playing an important role in the 1969 uprising in East Pakistan through his newspaper. In 1970, he was appointed as the executive editor of the Daily Ittefaq.

The Daily Ittefaq supported Sheikh Mujibur Rahman and his Awami League party. Awami League won the 1970 general election of Pakistan with an overwhelming victory. The West Pakistani rulers did not want to give its power to Awami League. On the night 25 March 1971, the Pakistani army destroyed the Ittefaq office with a bomb because of its support of the Awami League. After two or three months, the newspaper started publication again because of the government's order. During this time, Serajuddin Hossain started published strong articles against the Pakistani government as he had joined with the freedom fighters and the East Pakistan government, then in exile.

== Death ==
In early December 1971, the Indian army joined with the Bangladesh freedom fighters in their battle against Pakistan. Knowing that their defeat was certain, the Pakistani rulers then decided to kill all of the Bangladeshi intellectuals. Between 10 and 14 December, the Pakistan army captured and killed the intellectuals. Serajuddin Hossain was the first victim of this killing. On the night of 10 December, a number of Pakistani soldiers, along with members of Al-Badr and Razakar, captured him at his residence in Chamelibag, Shantinagar. He never returned nor was his body ever found.

On 3 November 2013, the International Crimes Tribunal – a special Bangladeshi court set up by the government – sentenced Chowdhury Mueen-Uddin and Ashrafuz Zaman Khan to death after the tribunal found him guilty in absentia of torture and murder of 18 intellectuals including Serajuddin Hossain during 1971 Liberation War of Bangladesh.

== Legacy ==
During his tenure at The Daily Ittefaq, Hossain was responsible for news selection and the composition of headlines. His editorial approach has been described by colleagues and media historians as prioritizing journalistic integrity.

The Shaheed Sirajuddin Hossain College in Khajura, Jessore, is named for him. There is also a public library named for him in Aarpara, Magura.

== Honours ==
- Ekushey Padak for journalism (1977)
- Manik Mia Gold Medal (2010)

== Publications ==
- Days Decisive
- Itihash Kotha Kow
- Mahioshi Nari
- Bir o Birangona
- Choto theke boro

== See also ==
- List of journalists killed in Bangladesh
