= Chowdhury Mueen-Uddin =

- চৌধুরী মঈনুদ্দীন
- Born: 27 November 1948 (age 77); East Bengal
- Known for: Former chairman of Muslim Aid; Former director of United Kingdom's National Health Service
- Criminal charges: 16 counts, including 1971 killing of Bengali intellectuals

Chowdhury Mueen-Uddin (Bengali: চৌধুরী মঈনুদ্দীন; born 27 November 1948) is a British Bangladeshi organisational leader, who served as the chairman of Muslim Aid, spokesperson of the Islamic Forum of Europe, and a director of the National Health Service (England).

He has been accused of war crimes prior to the establishment of the International Crimes Tribunal, but the allegations later found to be unsubstantiated and the High Court of Justice subsequently ruled that the claims were defamatory, leading the government to issue a public apology and pay £225,000 in libel damages following Supreme Court of the United Kingdom judgment confirming there was no lawful or evidential basis for the accusation.

Several human rights groups have acknowledged that the tribunal falls short of international standards and the hearings were biased. The verdict, which condemned him to death, generated significant domestic and international attention, leading to both support and criticism. The verdict subsequently led to public protests and clashes between his supporters, opponents, and law enforcement agencies, resulting in a series of riots and unrest.

The UK court ruled that the evidences did not clearly state that Mueenuddin had consistently denied all allegations against him. It also failed to explain that the International Crimes Tribunal has been widely criticised for its procedures and lack of fair‑trial protections, or that Mueenudddin did not have a proper opportunity to defend himself and could not safely attend the trial without facing a risk of execution. As a result, the Commission later removed all references to Mueenuddin from the online version of the report, although no formal correction was issued.

The Commission and the Home Office issued a formal apology to Muenuddin for the distress and damage to his reputation caused by the publication, as well as for the strain of prolonged legal proceedings. These proceedings concluded with a Supreme Court judgment in his favour in June 2024. The British Government also agreed to pay substantial damages for libel and cover his legal.

== Career ==
In 1971, Mueen-Uddin was a journalist at the Daily Purbodesh. In 1972, The New York Times reported that he "has been identified as the head of a secret, commando-like organization of fanatic Moslems", in connection with the Bangladesh liberation war. He fled Bangladesh shortly after its independence in 1971, and went to the United Kingdom via India, Nepal and Pakistan In the United Kingdom he was able to create a new life. He was a special editor of the London-based weekly Dawat and a leader of the London-based Jamaat organisation Dawatul Islam.

Mueen-Uddin is a director of Muslim Spiritual Care Provision in the United Kingdom's National Health Service (NHS), a member of Multi Faith Group for Healthcare Chaplaincy (MFGHC), and a trustee of Muslim Aid. He is currently a citizen of the UK.

Since moving to the UK in the early 1970s, Mueen-Uddin has taken British citizenship and built a career as a community activist and Muslim leader. In 1989 he was a key leader of protests against Salman Rushdie's novel, The Satanic Verses. Around the same time he helped to found the extremist Islamic Forum of Europe, Jamaat-e-Islami's European wing, which believes in creating a sharia state in Europe and in 2010 was accused by a Labour minister, Jim Fitzpatrick, of infiltrating the Labour Party. Tower Hamlets' directly elected mayor, Lutfur Rahman, was expelled from Labour for his close links with the IFE. Until 2010 Mueen-Uddin was vice-chairman of the controversial East London Mosque, controlled by the IFE, in which capacity he greeted Prince Charles when the heir to the throne opened an extension to the mosque. He was also closely involved with the Muslim Council of Britain, which has been dominated by the IFE. He was chairman and remains a trustee of the IFE-linked charity, Muslim Aid, which has a budget of £20 million. He has also been closely involved in the Markfield Institute, the key institution of Islamist higher education in the UK.

== War crimes trial ==
In 1995, a documentary film War Crimes File by David Bergman was aired on British television channel Channel 4 about the 1971 Bangladesh genocide. In the film, Mueen-Uddin was accused of being a member of the pro-Pakistan paramilitary force Al-Badr during the 1971 Bangladesh Liberation War, and of being involved in war crimes.

In 2012, Bangladesh law minister Shafique Ahmed stated that Mueen-Uddin would be charged for war crimes. However, the prosecution has delayed submitting charges. He is accused of being a top member of the notorious paramilitary force Al-Badr and of the fundamentalist Jamaat-e-Islami political party, which fought for the country to remain part of Pakistan. Mueen-Uddin has denied all allegations.

=== Arrest warrant and extradition conditions ===
On 2 May 2013, Bangladesh's International Crimes Tribunal brought war criminal charges against Mueen-Uddin and Ashrafuz Zaman Khan. The United Kingdom does not have an extradition agreement with Bangladesh, and the UK was reluctant to extradite Mueen-Uddin without assurances of a fair trial, plus assurances that there would be no death penalty in the event of a guilty verdict. Although Scotland Yard said in the 1990s that Bangladesh had primary jurisdiction for prosecuting Mueen for the 1971 killings, Britain could reconsider its decision to not prosecute.

Both Mueen and Khan were charged with committing a war crime by killing 18 intellectuals who were Dhaka University Professors Ghyasuddin Ahmed, Rashidul Hasan, Anwar Pasha, Faizul Mahi, famous playwright and Professor Munier Chowdhury, Mufazzal Haider Chaudhury, Dr Abul Khair, Dr Santosh Chandra Bhattacharyya and Dr Sirajul Haque Khan, Professor of Cardiology Mohammed Fazle Rabbee, eminent eye specialist AFM Alim Chowdhury, Physician Mohammad Martuza, Novelist and Journalist Shahidullah Kaiser, Journalist and Poet Selina Parvin, Journalists Serajuddin Hossain, Syed Nazmul Haque, ANM Golam Mostafa, and Nizamuddin Ahmed, in between 10 and 15 December 1971. An arrest warrant also issued for them. Both of them was most wanted after Bangladesh liberation war. According to prob report Chowdhury Mueen-Uddin was "operation-in-charge of Al-Badr".

=== Allegations from the relatives of the victims ===
The widow of one victim, Dolly Chaudhury, claims to have identified Mueen-Uddin as one of three men who abducted her husband, Mufazzal Haider Chaudhury, a prominent scholar of Bengali literature, on the night of 14 December 1971. "I was able to identify one [of the abductors], Mueen-Uddin," she said in video testimony, seen by The Sunday Telegraph. "He was wearing a scarf but my husband pulled it down as he was taken away. When he was a student, he often used to go to my brother in law's house. My husband, my sister-in-law, my brother-in-law, we all recognised that man." Professor Chaudhury was never seen again.

The widow of another victim, claims that Mueen-Uddin was in the group that abducted her husband, Sirajuddin Hussain, another journalist, from their home on the night of 10 December 1971. "There was no doubt that he was the person involved in my husband's abduction and killing," said Noorjahan Seraji. "I have waited 40 years to see the trial of the war criminals," said the widow, Noorjahan Seraji. "I have not spent a single night without suffering and I want justice."

One of the other members of the group, who was caught soon afterwards, allegedly gave Mueen-Uddin's name in his confession.

Another reporter on Purbodesh, Ghulam Mostafa, also disappeared. The vanished journalist's brother, Dulu, said he appealed to Mueen-Uddin for help and was taken around the main Pakistani Army detention and torture centres by Mueen-Uddin. Dulu Mostafa said that Mueen-Uddin appeared to be well known at the detention centres, gained easy admission to the premises and was saluted by the Pakistani guards as he entered. Ghulam was never found.

Mueen-Uddin's then editor at the paper, Atiqur Rahman, said that Mueen-Uddin had been the first journalist in the country to reveal the existence of the Al-Badr Brigade and had demonstrated intimate knowledge of its activities. After his colleagues disappeared, he said, Mueen-Uddin had asked for his home address. Fearing that he too would be abducted, the editor gave a fake address. Rahman's name, complete with the fake address, appeared on an Al-Badr death list found just after the end of the war. "I gave that address only to Chowdhury Mueen-Uddin, and when that list appeared it was obvious that he had given that address to Al Badr," Rahman said in statements given to the investigators. "I'm sure I gave the address to no-one else." Rahman then published a front-page story and picture about Mueen-Uddin, who had by that stage left the city, naming him as involved in "disappearances."

This brought forward two further witnesses, Mushtaqur and Mahmudur Rahman, who claim they recognised the picture as somebody who had been part of an armed group looking for the BBC correspondent in Dhaka during the abductions. The group was unsuccessful because the BBC man had gone into hiding.

=== Verdict ===
On 3 November 2013, the International Crimes Tribunal – a special Bangladeshi court set up by the government – sentenced Mueen-uddin to death after the tribunal found him guilty in absentia of torture and murder of 18 intellectuals during 1971 Liberation war of Bangladesh. According to The Daily Star, lawyers called no defence witnesses, whereas the prosecution brought in 25 witnesses, due to non-co-operation from Mueen-Uddin's family. Those sentenced in absentia are not eligible to challenge the court's verdict. Chowdhury Mueen-Uddin denied the charges in an interview aired by Al Jazeera in August 2013.

The tribunal also said that Mueen-Uddin sometimes carried out the murders, and sometimes instigated and encouraged them. They ruled that he and his allies had complete control over the Al Badr during the 1971 War.

=== Reaction of trial from defence ===
However, the trial was criticised by Bangladesh Jamaat-e-Islami, the party he was served and which opposed the creation of Bangladesh and took part in committing war crime in 1971, stated that the trials were politically motivated. They also accused the current government of trying to destroy the opposition party by sentencing its leadership to death. However, the political motivation against Mueen-Uddin is unclear as he is living in the UK for more than 40 years. Mueen-Uddin's Legal Counsel described the verdict as "farcical". He further alleged "serious judicial and prosecutorial misconduct and the collusion of the Government with members of the judiciary and prosecution", and condemned the entire trial as a "show trial".

John Cammegh, a barrister in chambers at 9 Bedford Row, London, which represents Mueen-Uddin, in an op-ed piece, stated that the trial "made mockery of that principle [of international law], and that it served as "a terrible warning of the way in which the ideals of universal justice and accountability can be abused".

=== Reaction from victims' relatives about verdict ===
Relatives of the victims voiced their satisfaction at the verdicts. Professor Rashiddudin Ahmad, whose brother Giasuddin Ahmed, a university teacher at the time was amongst those killed, said: "We have waited 40 years for this. It is some sort of justice, even though the sentence may never be carried out."

=== Europe's reaction to the trial ===
The UK said on 22 January 2013 that it supported the war crimes trial in Bangladesh but always opposed capital punishment while Germany and France termed the trial an internal affair of the country. They gave their reactions a day after the International Crimes Tribunal-2 awarded death sentence to Abul Kalam Azad for genocide and crimes against humanity during the Liberation War.

Warren Daley, spokesperson of the British high commission in Dhaka, said: "The UK has made clear its support for Bangladesh's efforts to bring to justice those accused of atrocities committed in 1971. Along with our EU partners, we are however opposed to the application of the death penalty in all circumstances."

== See also ==
- Al-Badr, paramilitary wing of the West Pakistan Army during the Bangladesh Liberation War
- Razakars, paramilitary force in East Pakistan during the Bangladesh Liberation War
