= Martyred Intellectuals Memorial, Mirpur =

Memorial in Dhaka, Bangladesh

Mirpur Martyred Intellectuals Memorial
- মিরপুর শহীদ বুদ্ধিজীবী স্মৃতিসৌধ
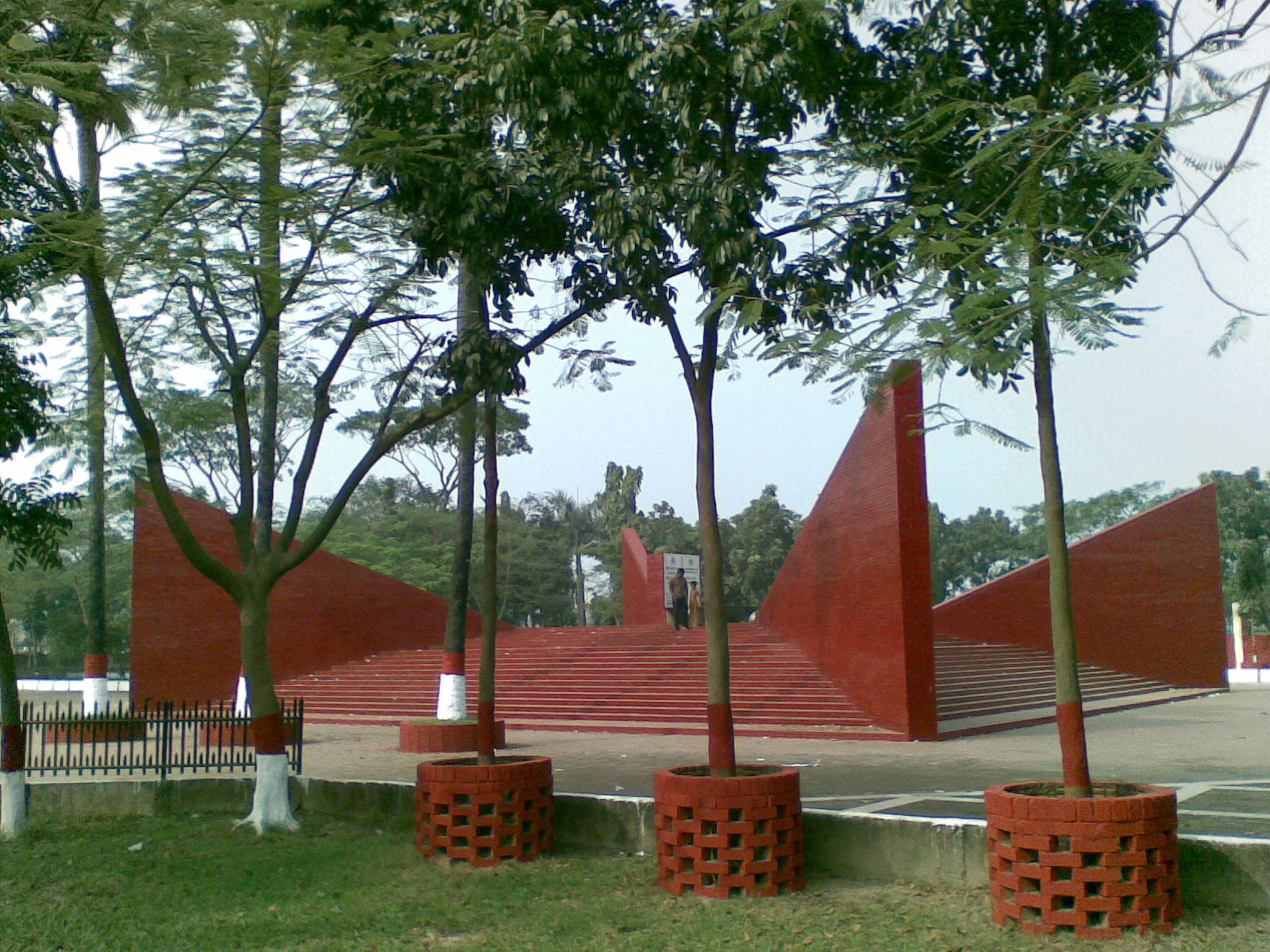
- Martyred Intellectuals Memorial
- Interactive map of the Mirpur Martyred Intellectuals Memorial area

General information
- Type: Memorial and Public Monument
- Location: Mazar Road, Mirpur-1, Mirpur Thana, Dhaka-1216, Dhaka, Bangladesh
- Coordinates: 23.79377°N 90.34541°E
- Inaugurated: 22 December 1972

Design and construction
- Architect: Mustafa Harun Quddus Hili

Mirpur Martyred Intellectuals Memorial (Bengali: মিরপুর শহীদ বুদ্ধিজীবী স্মৃতিসৌধ) is a memorial in Mirpur Thana of Dhaka District in Bangladesh, commemorating the intellectuals killed on 14 December 1971 during the Bangladesh Liberation War and the Bangladesh genocide. The memorial's plaque was unveiled on 22 December 1972.

== History ==
=== Background ===
As the war neared its end and Pakistani surrender became apparent, the Pakistan Army made a final effort to eliminate the intelligentsia of the new nation of Bangladesh. On 14 December 1971, over 200 Bengali intellectuals, including professors, journalists, doctors, artists, engineers, and writers, were abducted from their homes in Dhaka by the Al-Badr militia and the Pakistan Army. Novelist Shahidullah Kaiser and playwright Munier Choudhury were among the victims. They were taken blindfolded to torture cells in Mirpur, Mohammadpur, Nakhalpara, Rajarbagh, and other locations in different parts of the city. Later they were executed en masse, most notably at Rayerbazar and Mirpur. In memory of the martyred intellectuals, 14 December is mourned in Bangladesh as Shaheed Buddhijibi Dibosh, or Day of the Martyred Intellectuals.

After the independence of Bangladesh, a list of Bengali intellectuals was discovered on a page of Major General Rao Farman Ali's diary left behind at the Governor's House. The existence of such a list was confirmed by Ali himself, although he denied the motive of genocide. The same was also confirmed by Altaf Gauhar, a former Pakistani bureaucrat. He mentioned an incident in which Gauhar asked Ali to remove a friend's name from the list, and Ali did so in his presence.

=== Construction and unveiling ===
The memorial was constructed following independence and formally dedicated the year after the war. The memorial's plaque was officially unveiled on 22 December 1972 by Prime Minister Sheikh Mujibur Rahman. The monument was designed by architect Mostafa Harun Kuddus Hili.

=== Renovation ===
Since its inauguration the memorial has undergone several renovations and maintenance works. Responsibility for the site's upkeep currently rests with Dhaka North City Corporation. Periodic restoration projects and official statements about the memorial's condition and management have been reported in national media and by local government agencies.

== Gallery ==
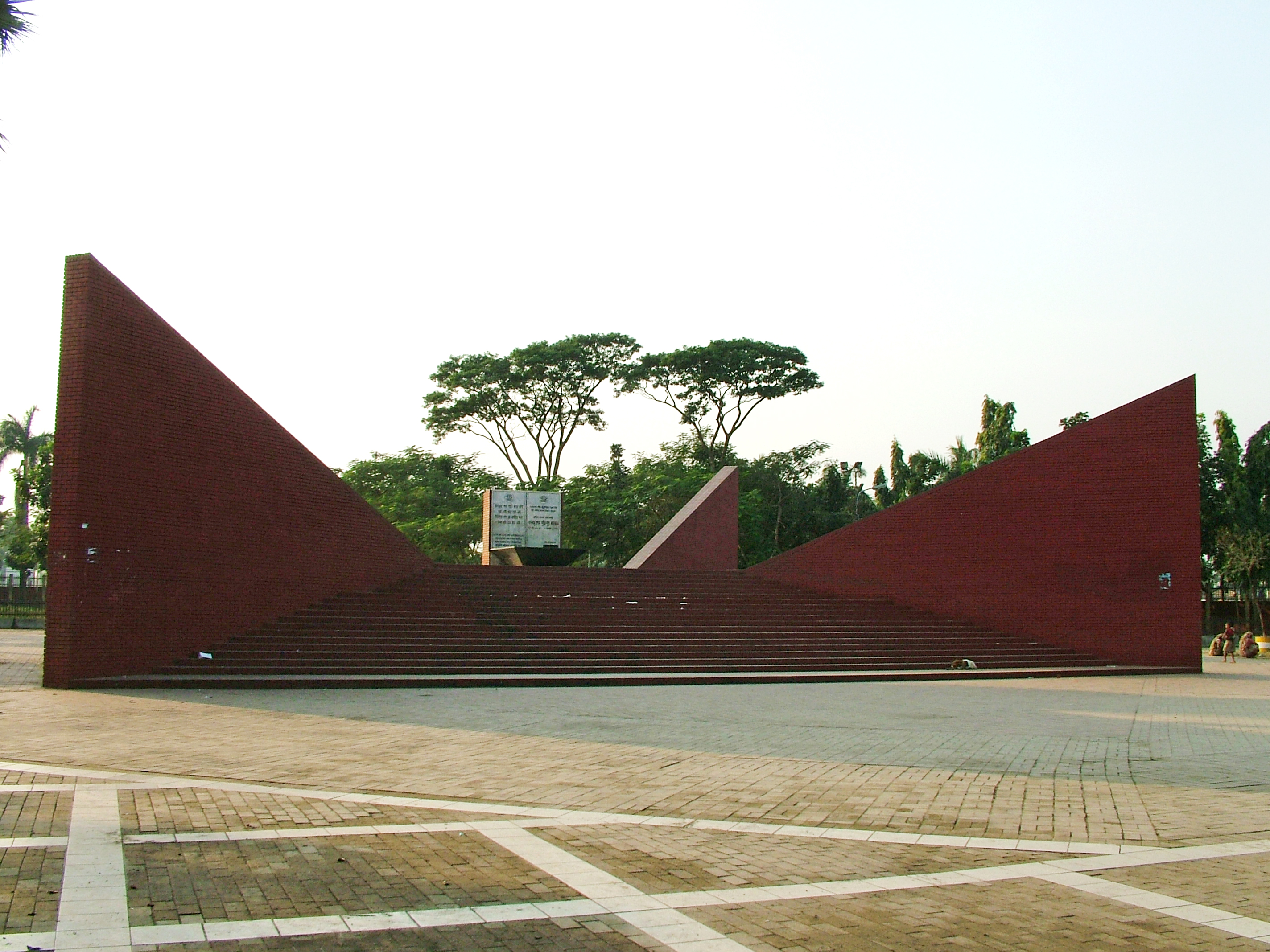

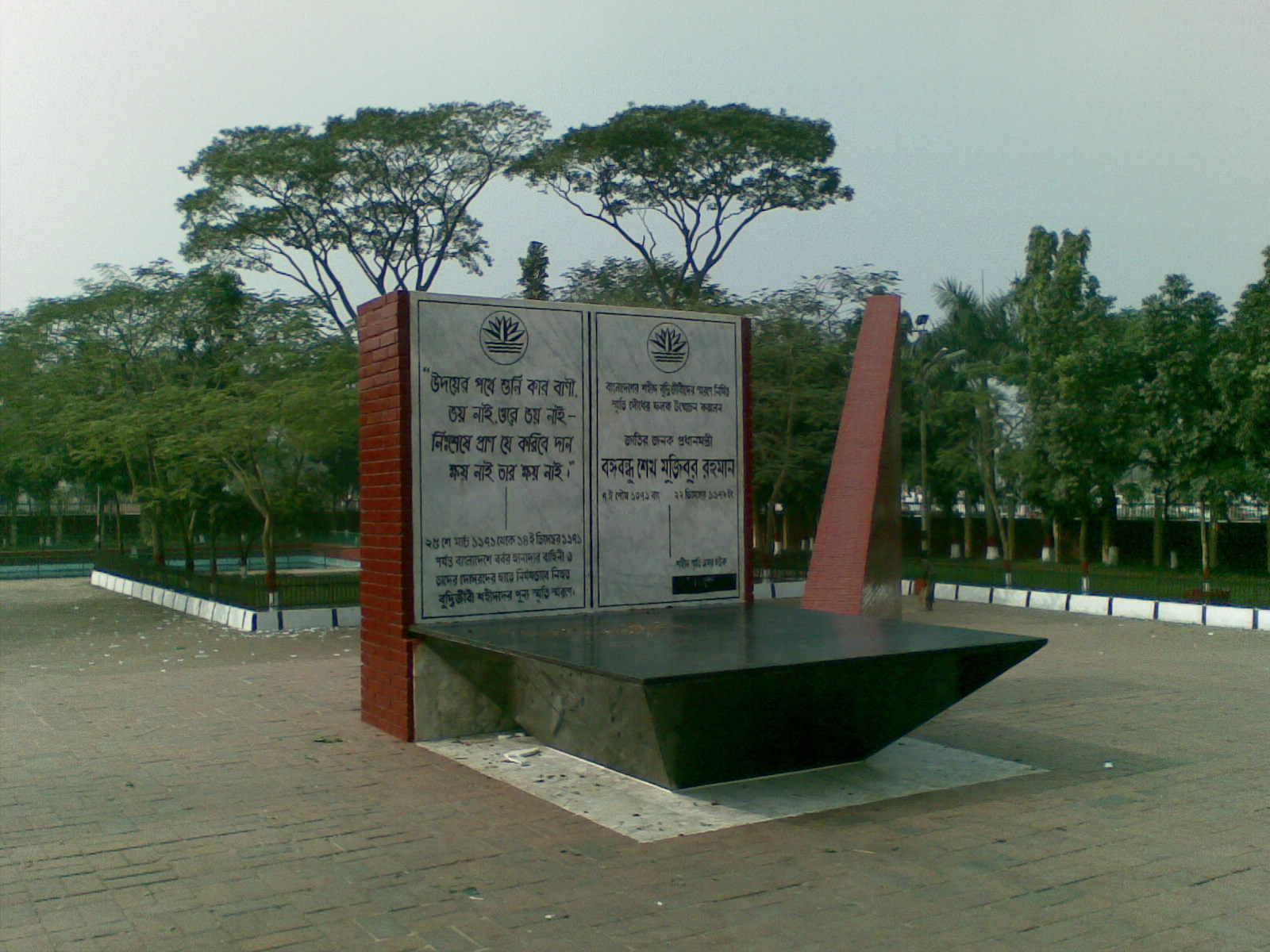

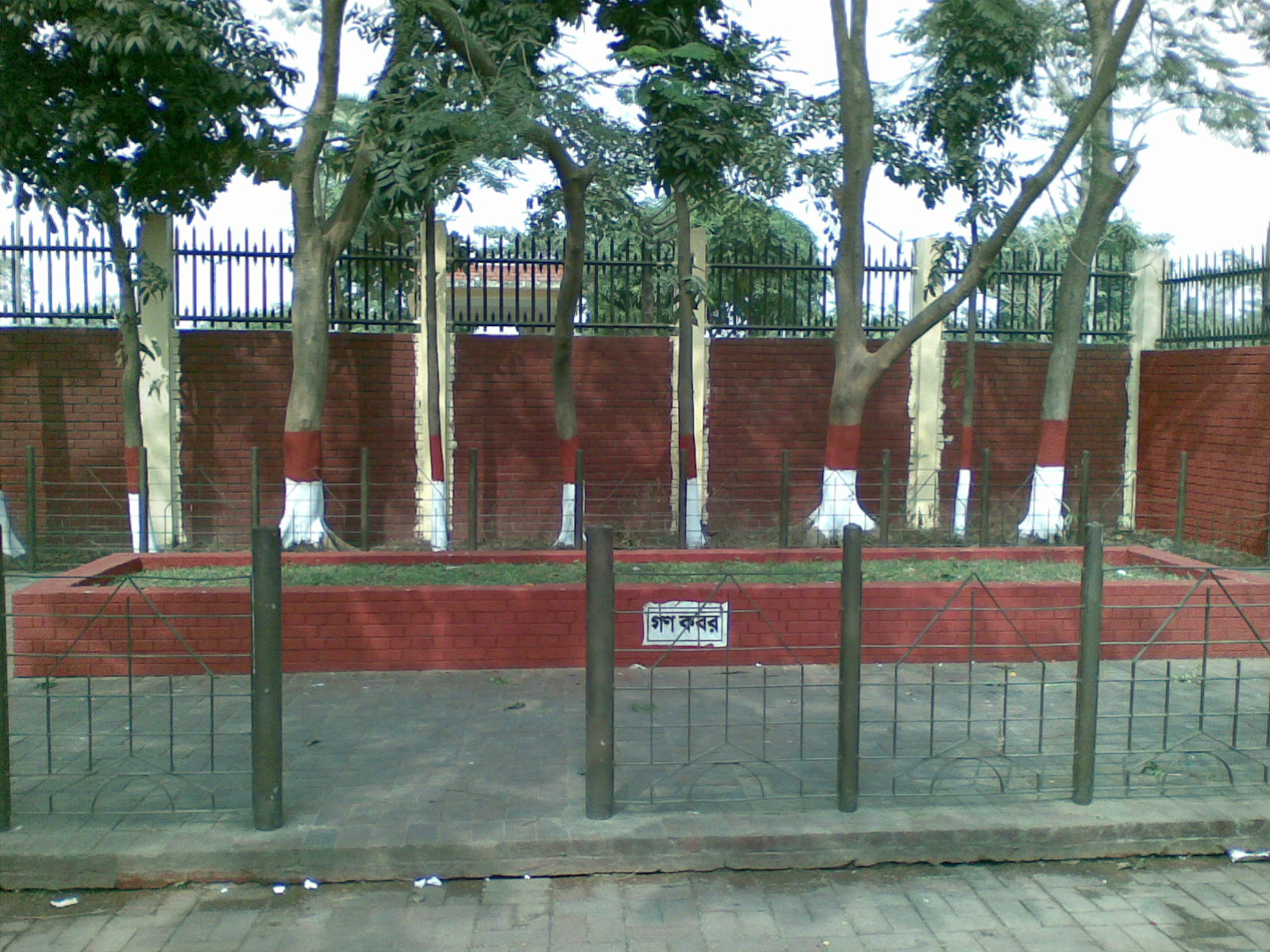

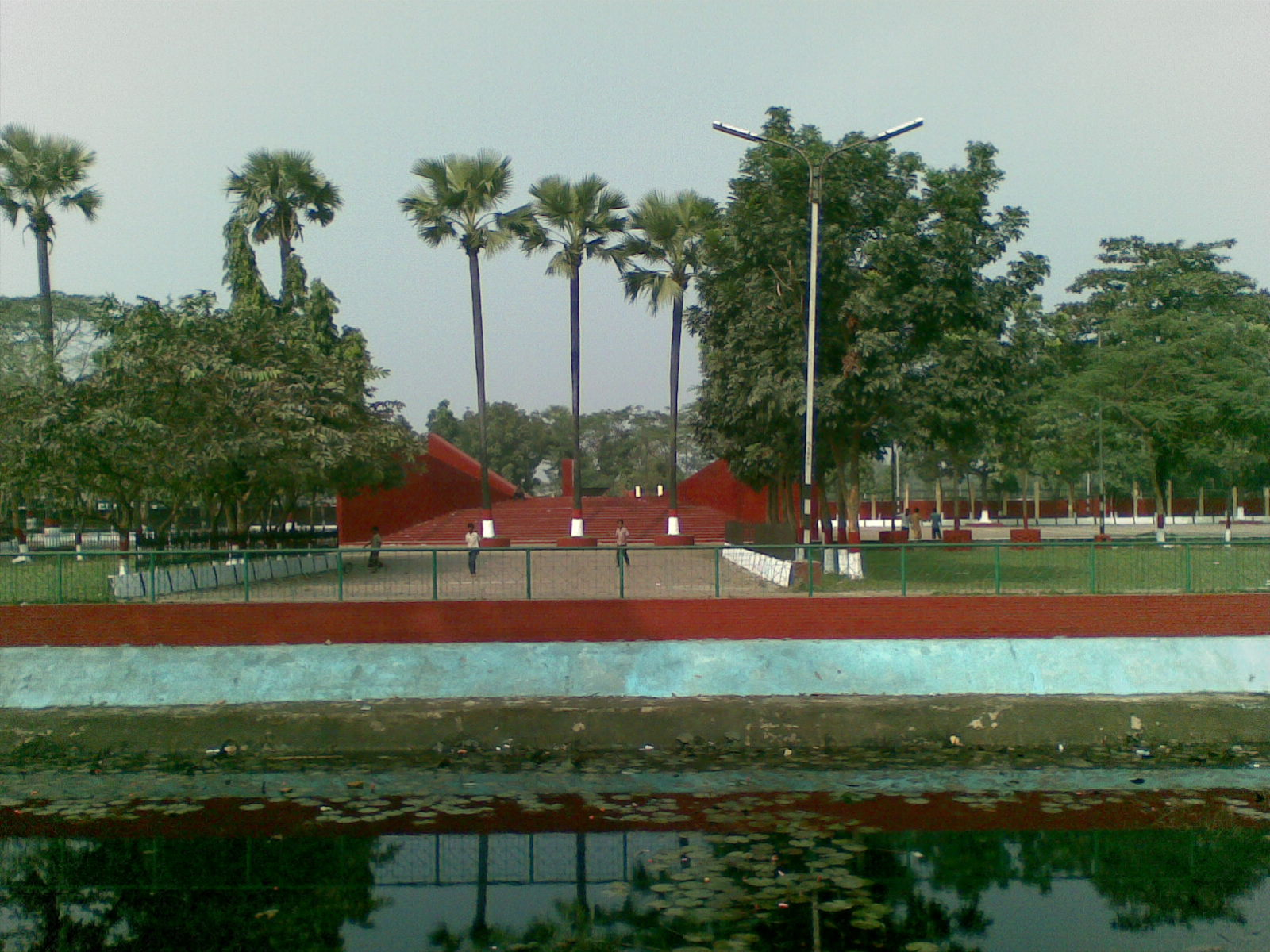

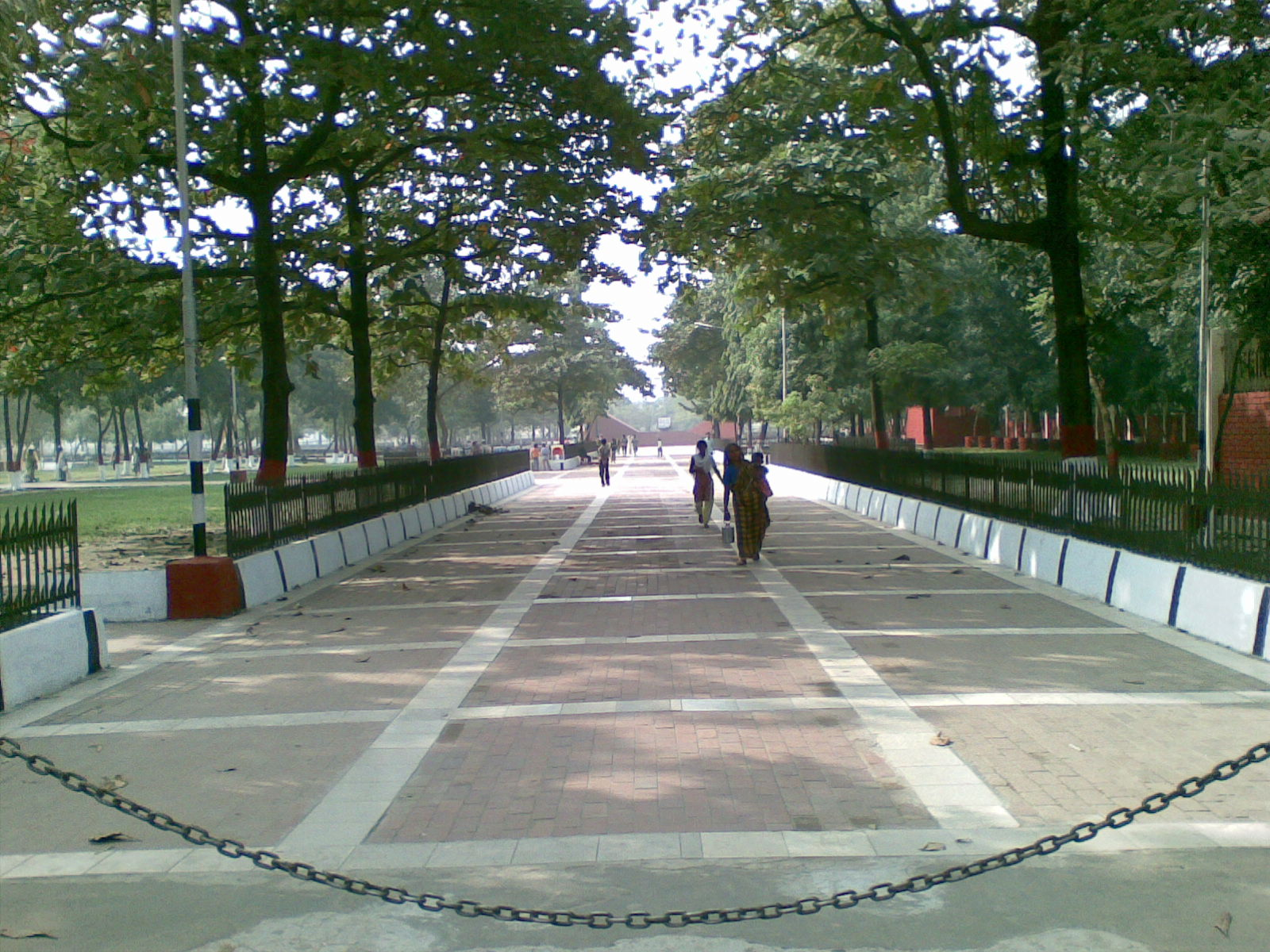

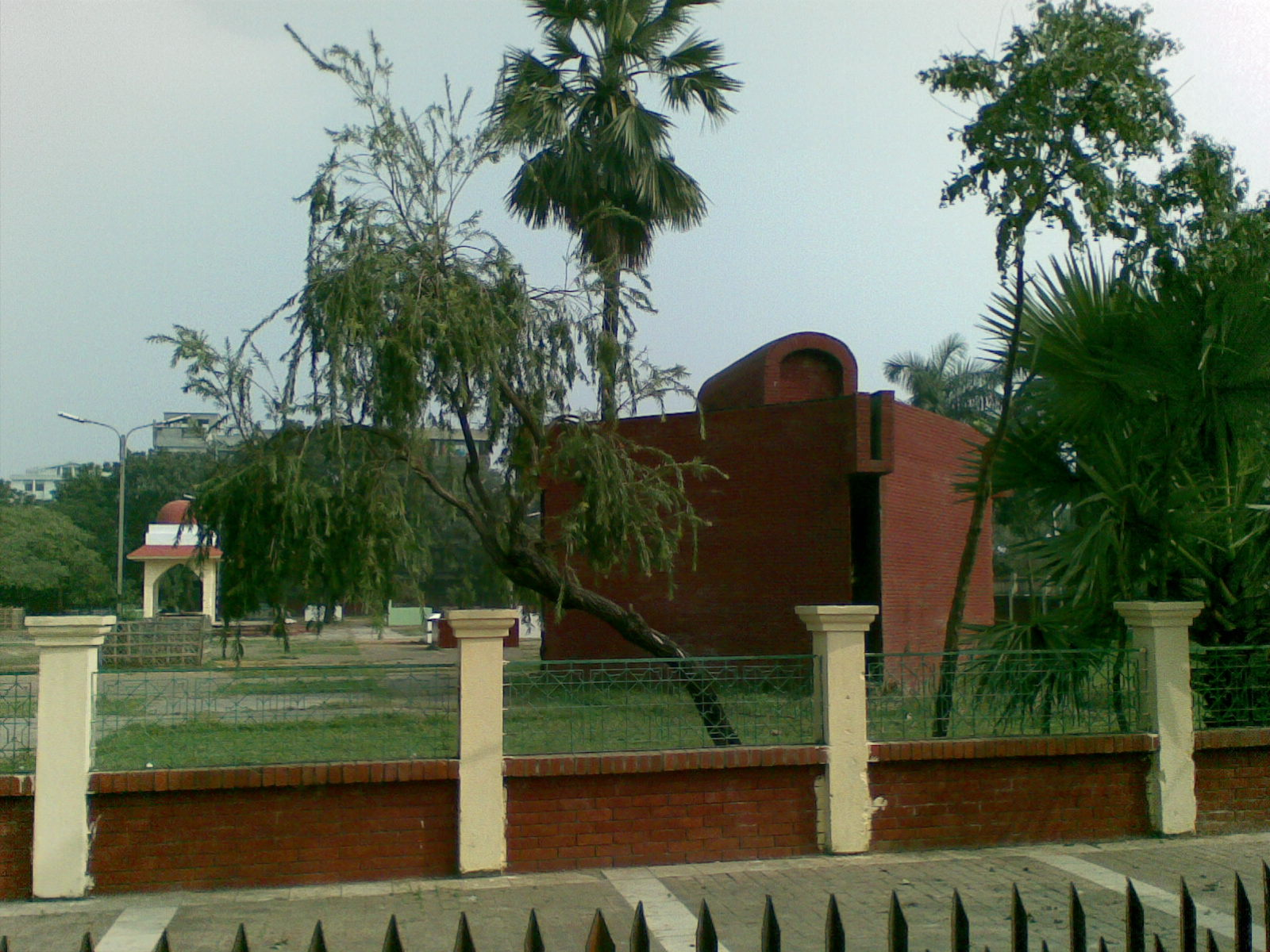
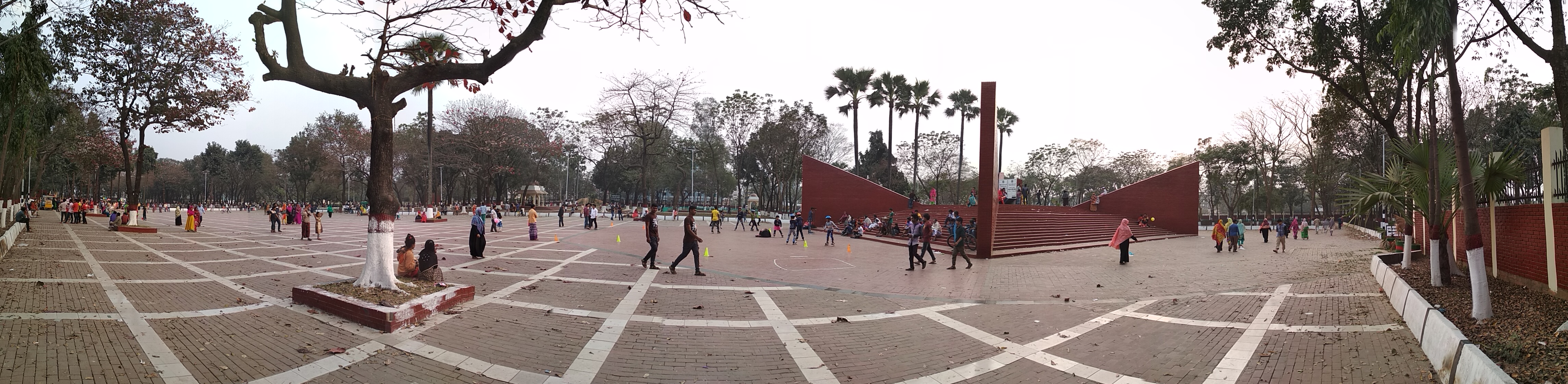
