= Selina Parvin =

Bangladeshi journalist and poet

- Born: Siddiqua Chowdhury; 31 March 1931; Ramganj, Bengal, British India
- Died: 14 December 1971 (aged 40); Rayer Bazaar, Dhaka, Bangladesh
- Cause of death: Assassination by Bayonet charge
- Burial place: Azimpur, Dhaka, Bangladesh
- Other name: Manwara Begum
- Occupations: Journalist, poet
- Years active: 1959 - 1971
- Known for: Martyred Intellectual
- Parent: Moulvi Abidur Rahman (father) Mossamat Sajeda Khatoon (mother)

Selina Parvin (31 March 1931 – 14 December 1971) was a Bangladeshi journalist and poet. She is one of the intellectual martyrs killed by Al-Badr on 14 December, immediately before the victory after the 9-month-long war of independence of Bangladesh in 1971. This day later came to be commemorated as the intellectual martyr day. As a journalist she used to work for Weekly Begum, Weekly Lalana and Shilalipi. She was buried in Azimpur Graveyard on 18 December 1971.

== Childhood ==
Selina was born in Ramganj Upazila of erstwhile Noakhali District. Her father Md Abidur Rahman was a teacher. When after World War II her father's house in Feni District was seized, the family had to settle back in village. Then 12-year-old Selina was a student in class six and skilled in writing poetry and stories. Due to the traditional conservative rural context she had to put an end to her schooling. At the age of 14 she was married against her consent and she refused to live with her husband. She wanted to study further but could not succeed in the matriculation exam. After 10 years they divorced.

== Career ==
Selina Parvin had a job for in nursing at Mitford Hospital in 1957. She worked for some time as a matron in Rokeya Hall in 1959 and joined the Azimpur Baby Home as a teacher in 1960. She worked for some time in Salimulla Orphanage in 1965 and then joined as secretary to the editor of week Begum in 1966. In 1967 Selina Parvin joined the Weekly Lalana as a journalist. She then married a politician. She used to work with various periodicals and used to publish her own pro-liberation periodical Shilalipi on an irregular basis. She used the weekly's earning to help freedom fighters. In Shailalipi, Selina Parveen used to publish articles by prominent personalities including Prof Munir Chowdhury, journalist Shahidullah Kaiser, Zahir Raihan and ANM Golam Mostafa, all of whom except Raihan became targets of Al-Badr. Zahir Raihan left his house on 30 January 1972 looking for his brother Shahidullah Kaiser, but never returned.

== Death ==
On 13 December 1971, like other intellectual martyrs, Selina Parvin was seized by members of the paramilitary force Al-Badr. Her son Sumon was only 7 years old. She was brutally killed on 14 December and her dead body was later discovered in the Rayerbazar Boddhobhumy. Delwar Hossain, the lone survivor of the killing, testified to the court that being blindfolded, he heard a woman [Selina Parvin] screaming and begging Al-Badr men for her life, appealed to spare her as she had a son and there was none to take care of him but her. But the brutal killers did not spare her. She was instantly killed by charging bayonet as narrated by the witness. The lone survivor, who managed to loosen the rope with which he was tied and escaped, had described how three prisoners were tortured before being taken out to be shot. Among the victims, Selina Parvin was [later] found with two bayonet wounds, one through the eye and one in the stomach, and two bullet wounds.

On 3 November 2013, Chowdhury Mueen-Uddin, a Muslim leader based in London, and Ashrafuz Zaman Khan, based in the US, were sentenced in absentia after the court found that they were involved in the abduction and murders of 18 people in December 1971 – nine Dhaka University teachers, six journalists including Selina Parvin, and three physicians.

== See also ==
- List of journalists killed in Bangladesh
