= Syed Nazmul Haque =

- সৈয়দ নাজমুল হক
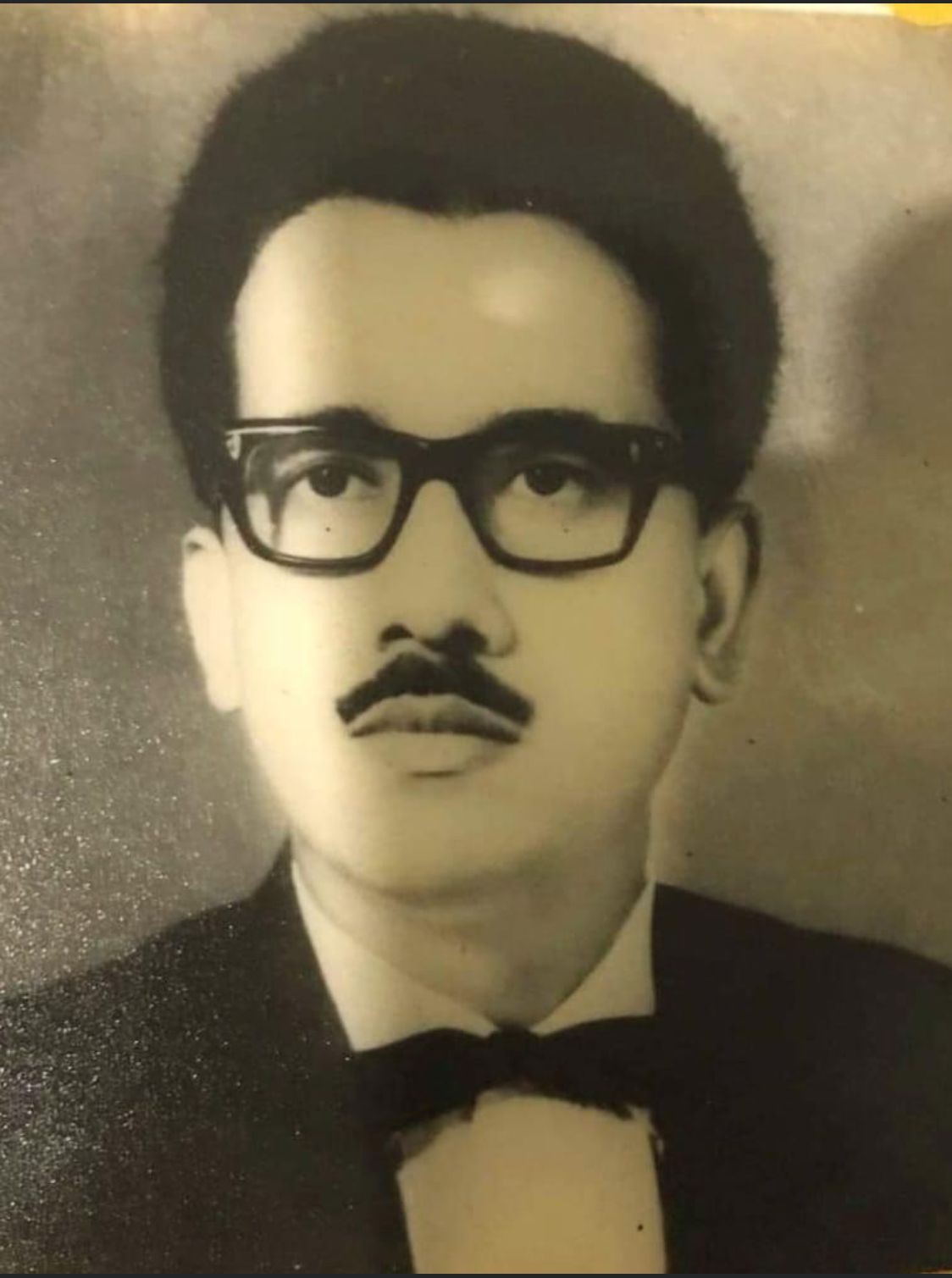
- Haque in c. 1968.
- Born: 1941; Khulna, Bengal, British India
- Died: 14 December 1971 (aged 29–30); Purana Paltan, Dhaka, East Pakistan, Pakistan
- Body discovered: Unknown

Syed Nazmul Haque, (Bengali: সৈয়দ নাজমুল হক; 1941 – 14 December 1971) born in the district of Khulna, was a martyred Bengali journalist.

== Education and career ==
Syed Nazmul Haque passed B.A. (Hons) and M.A. in political science from Dhaka University in 1963 and 1964 respectively. He took active part in the anti-martial law movement in 1962. He was arrested for disrupting the convocation program on the DU campus in 1964 where the then governor of East Pakistan Abdul Monem Khan was present. He passed the superior service examination in 1967 and was selected for the information service. But because of the police case against him for disrupting the convocation he was not allowed to join the service.

He later took up journalism as a full-time profession. He became the chief reporter of Pakistan Press International and Dhaka correspondent of Columbia Broadcasting Service. He prepared a full report on the proceedings of Agartala Conspiracy Case. He sent news items on the atrocities carried out by the Pakistani forces during the liberation war of Bangladesh. On 6 August 1971 he was arrested in Dhaka and sent to a prison in West Pakistan. He was pressured to testify against Sheikh Mujibur Rahman in a secret trial. On getting release in November 1971 he returned to Dhaka.

== Death ==
On 11 December 1971, he was picked up from his Purana Paltan house by the members of Al-Badr. His dead body was never found.

On 3 November 2013, Chowdhury Mueen-Uddin, a Muslim leader based in London, and Ashrafuz Zaman Khan, based in the US, were sentenced in absentia after the court found that they were involved in the abduction and murders of 18 people – six journalists including Syed Nazmul Haque, nine Dhaka University teachers and three physicians – in December 1971.

== See also ==
- 1971 Bangladesh atrocities
