= Rashidul Hasan =

- রাশীদুল হাসান
- Born: 1 November 1932; Birbhum, Bengal, British India
- Died: 14 December 1971 (aged 39); Nakhalpara, Dhaka, Bangladesh
- Resting place: Shahbag, Dhaka, Bangladesh
- Education: University of Dhaka
- Known for: Martyred Intellectual
- Children: 1
- Awards: Independence Day Award

SMA Rashidul Hasan (1932 – 14 December 1971) was a Bengali educationist. He was born in the district of Birbhum, British India (now in West Bengal, India). In 1949, he migrated to East Pakistan. He was awarded the Independence Day Award in 2018 posthumously by the government of Bangladesh.

== Early life and education ==
Hasan was born in 1932 to a Bengali Muslim family in the village of Barashija in Birbhum district, Bengal Presidency. He was the son of Maulvi Mohammad Abu Saeed. He studied at the Bhabta Azizia Madrasa in Murshidabad, and passed his Intermediate of Arts from the Islamic Intermediate College in Dhaka. After that, Hasan obtained his BA (Hons.) and MA in English from the University of Dhaka in 1957 and 1958, respectively.

== Career ==
He taught at various colleges including Narsingdi, Pabna Edward College, and Krishna Chandra College of Bhirbhum in West Bengal. Finally, he joined the University of Dhaka English Department in 1967. He was a liberal democrat and a lifelong fighter against fundamentalism and communism.

== Death ==
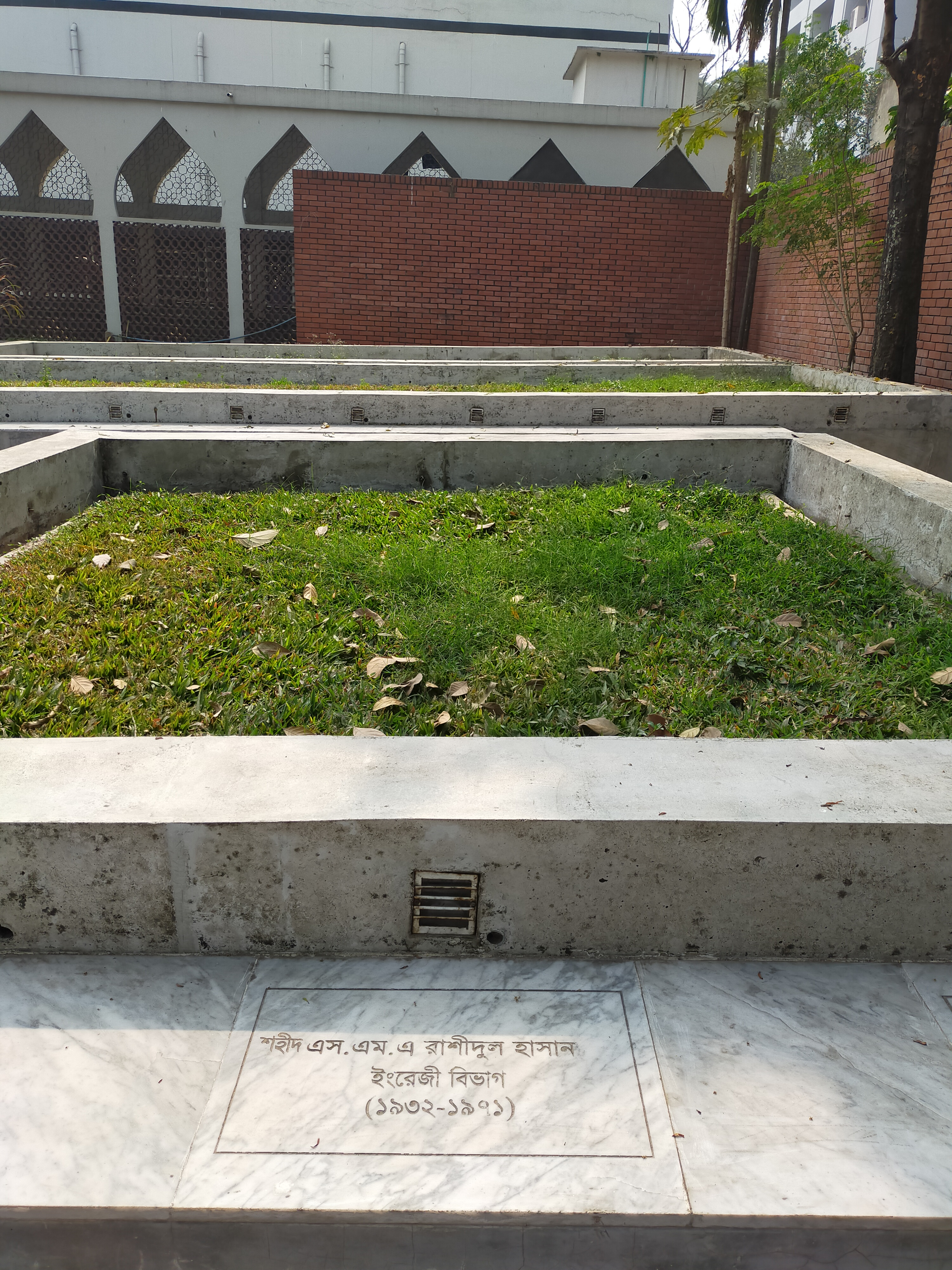
Grave of Hasan by the side of Dhaka University central mosque

On 20 September 1971, the Pakistani occupation army arrested Hasan. He was accused of encouraging students to fight for the liberation of Bangladesh. With the help of a friend of his he returned 12 days later unharmed. On the morning of 14 December, two days before independence, Hasan was taken together with his close friend Anwar Pasha from the same flat within the University of Dhaka campus by the Al Badar forces. The two families were then living together in a flat in the Isa Khan Road area. After 22 days of his disappearance, his decomposed body was found in the Mirpur killing ground and buried in the compound of the Dhaka University Central mosque.

On 3 November 2013, Chowdhury Mueen-Uddin, a Muslim leader based in London, and Ashrafuz Zaman Khan, based in the United States, were sentenced in absentia after the court found that they were involved in the abduction and murders of 18 people in December 1971 - nine University of Dhaka teachers, including Rashidul Hasan and Anwar Pasha; six journalists; and three physicians.

== See also ==
- 1971 Bangladesh atrocities
