= Institute of Education and Research, University of Dhaka =

Institution for the study of education in Bangladesh

Institute of Education and Research (IER)
- শিক্ষা ও গবেষণা ইনস্টিটিউট
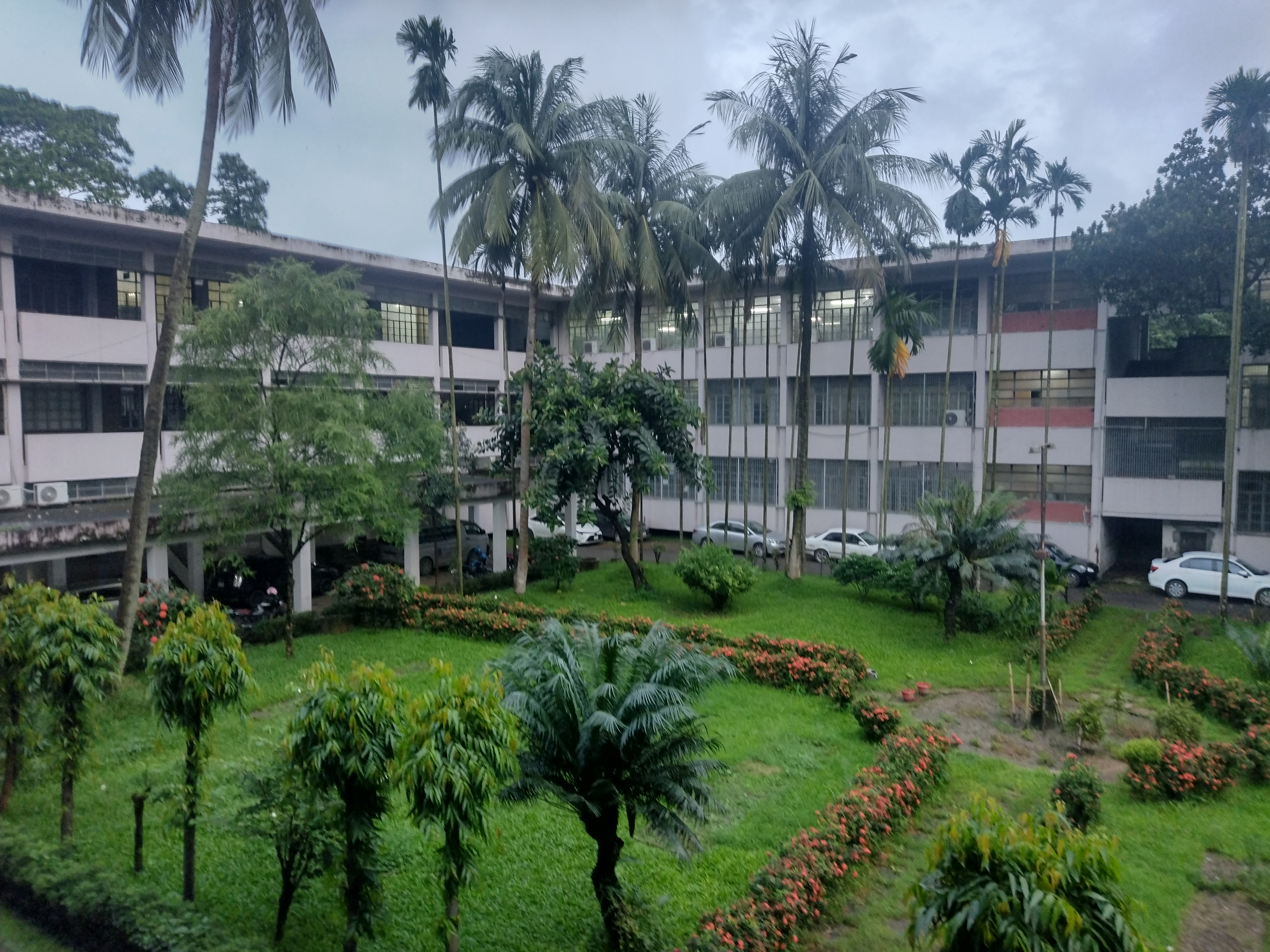
- Type: Semi-autonomous Institute under University of Dhaka
- Established: 1959
- Director: Abdul Halim
- Faculty: 52
- Undergraduates: 600
- Postgraduates: 700
- Location: Dhaka, Bangladesh; 23.7350°N 90.3936°E
- Campus: Urban, located at Shahbag

The Institute of Education and Research, University of Dhaka(Bengali: শিক্ষা ও গবেষণা ইনস্টিটিউট, ঢাকা বিশ্ববিদ্যালয়), (also known as IER, University of Dhaka or simply IER), is the oldest and biggest institution for the study of education in Bangladesh. The Institute of Education and Research was established as the first institute of the University of Dhaka with the technical and financial assistance of United States Agency for International Development (USAID). It is run by the Second Statute Under President's Order of 1973 and governed by a separate Board of Governors headed by the Vice-Chancellor of the university.

== Departments of IER ==
M.Ed., MPhil and PhD programs are offered under the following ten departments.

- Department of Pre-Primary and Primary Education (PPE)
- Department of Language Education (LE)
- Department of Social Science Education (SSE)
- Department of Science, Mathematics, and Technology Education (SMTE)
- Department of Curriculum and Instructional Technology (CIT)
- Department of Educational Administration (EA)
- Department of Educational Psychology and Guidance (EPG)
- Department of Educational Evaluation and Research (EER)
- Department of Non-formal and Continuing Education (NFCE)
- Department of Special Education (SPE)

== Offering diploma/degree ==
IER offers the following teaching programs leading to Diploma/Degree in Education

- Four-year Bachelor of Education (Honors)
- One-year Master of Education (Regular)
- (One-year and Two-year) Master of Education (Professional)
- Two-year M.Phil.
- Ph.D. in Education

== Publications ==
IER publishes a journal under the title "Teacher's World" bi-yearly. The journal provides an opportunity to publish research and creative articles by the faculty members and other professionals.

== Notable alumni ==
- Sirajul Haque Khan, educationist and martyred intellectual of 1971
- Musa Ibrahim, the first Bangladeshi to reach the summit of Mount Everest
- Abdullah Mohammad Saad, filmmaker
- Sayeda Rubina Akter, member of the Bangladesh Parliament
- Habibur Rahman (police officer), 36th commissioner of Dhaka Metropolitan Police
