= Sirajul Haque Khan =

- সিরাজুল হক খান
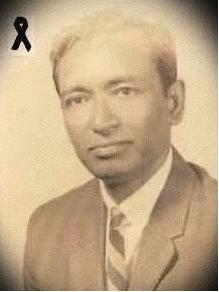
- Born: 1924
- Died: 14 December 1971 (aged 46–47)
- Education: University of Dhaka

Sirajul Haque Khan, (1924 – 14 December 1971) born in the district of Noakhali, was a Bengali educationist and martyred intellectual of 1971.

== Education ==
Khan received his bachelor's degree in 1943 from the University of Calcutta before receiving his Bachelor of Teaching and Master of Education degrees from the Institute of Education Research (IER) at Dhaka University. He received his Doctor of Education degree from University of Northern Colorado in 1967 and joined IER at Dhaka University as a senior lecturer.

== Death and legacy ==
On 14 December 1971, a group of Al-Badr members forcibly removed him from his home and murdered him. His body was found in Mirpur, Dhaka. He was buried in Dhaka University Central Mosque. On 14 November 1991, Bangladesh Post Office issued commemorative stamp with his name and picture. On 3 November 2013, two Jamaat leaders, Chowdhury Mueen-Uddin and Ashrafuz Zaman Khan, received a death sentence in absentia for his death.

== Gallery ==
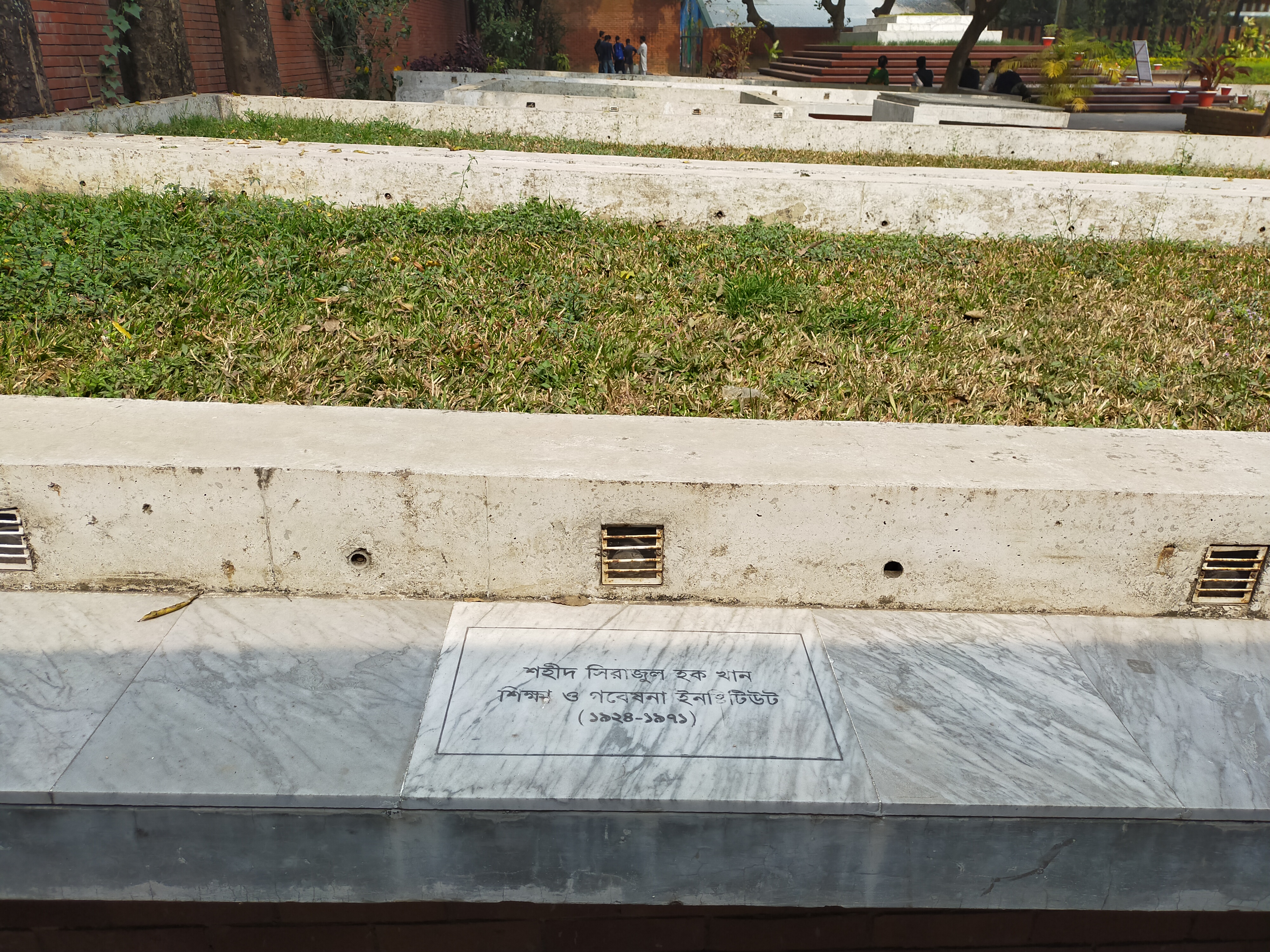
Grave of Sirajul Haque Khan by the side of Dhaka University central mosque
