= ANM Golam Mostafa =

- আনম গোলাম মোস্তফা
- Born: 1942; Nilphamari, Bengal, British India
- Died: 14 December 1971 (aged 28–29); Nakhalpara, Dhaka, Bangladesh
- Known for: Martyred Intellectual

ANM Golam Mostafa (1942 – 14 December 1971) was a martyred Bengali journalist.

== Early life and career ==
Mostofa was born in 1942 in Pangagram in Nilphamari district. He graduated from Surendranath College in 1963. He completed his master's degree from University of Dhaka in 1965.

Mostafa, a sub-editor of Dainik Purbadesh, was an outspoken person known for his secular views.

== Participation in Bengali movements ==
Mostafa suffer imprisonment for taking part anti-Ayub mass movement in 1969. According to Kamal Lohani, Mostofa started believing from late 1970 that the then East Pakistan would be independent and that Mostafa was the first to call East Pakistan, ‘Bangladesh.’

== Death ==
Mostafa's son Anirban Mostafa was only nine months old when some armed Al-Badr men abducted his father from their Gopibagh house on 11 December 1971. Golam Mostafa never returned home, neither was his body ever found.

On 3 November 2013, Chowdhury Mueen-Uddin, a Muslim leader based in London, and Ashrafuz Zaman Khan, based in the US, were sentenced in absentia after the court found that they were involved in the abduction and murders of 18 people – six journalists including Golam Mostafa, nine Dhaka University teachers and three physicians – in December 1971. Mueenuddin and Golam Mostafa were colleagues at the daily Purbadesh in 1971.

== See also ==
- 1971 Bangladesh atrocities
