= Mohammed Fazle Rabbee =

Bangladeshi cardiologist and martyr

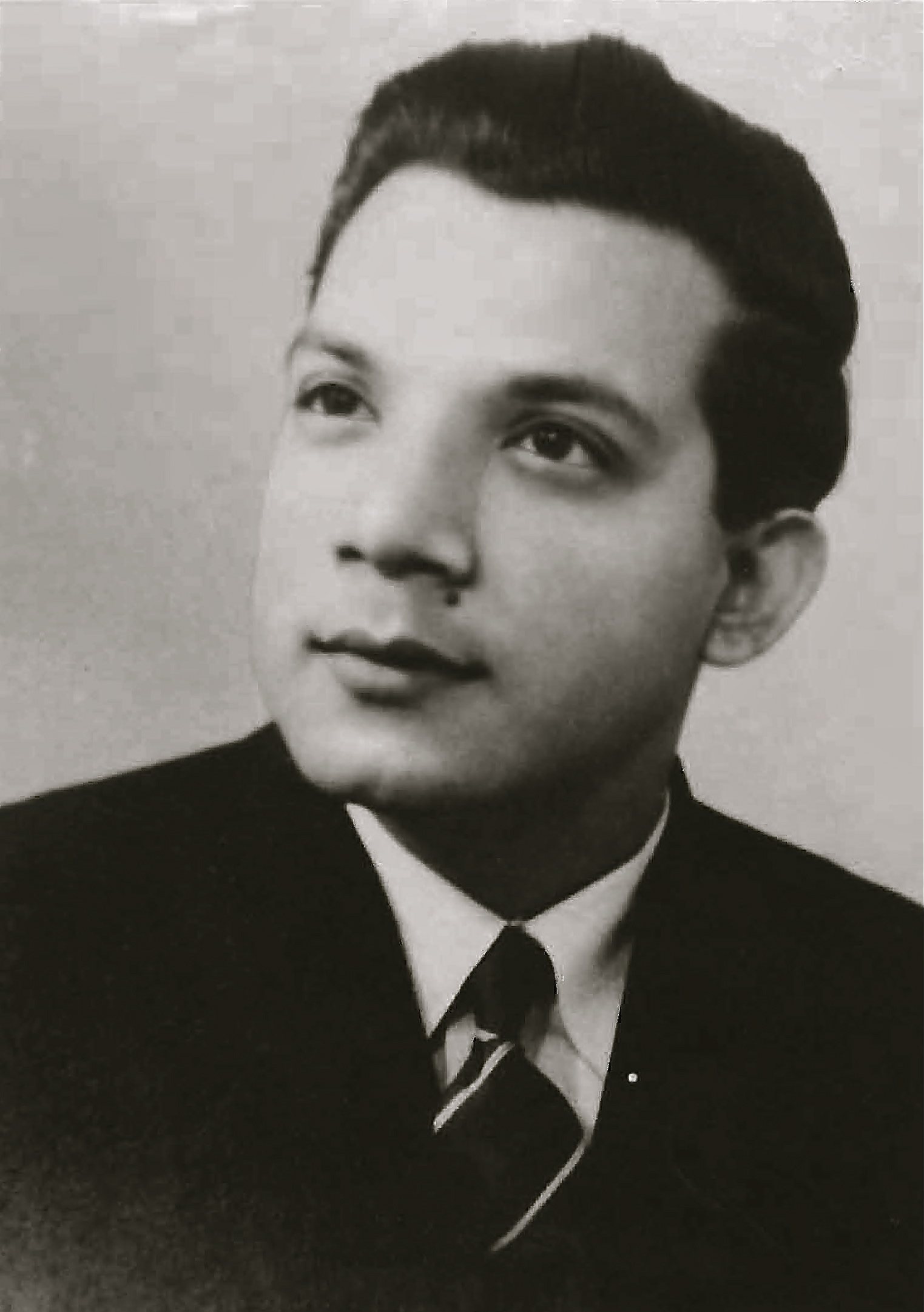
- Born: 21 September 1932; Pabna, Bengal Presidency, British India
- Died: 15 December 1971 (aged 39); Dhaka, East Pakistan, Pakistan
- Cause of death: Assassination by gunshots in the 1971 intellectual killings
- Education: Pabna Zilla School; Dhaka College; Dhaka Medical College; Royal College of Physicians
- Occupations: Cardiologist, professor
- Spouse: Jahan Ara Rabbee (m. 1957)

Mohammed Fazle Rabbee (occasionally spelled Rabbi, Bengali: মোহাম্মদ ফজলে রাব্বী; 21 September 1932 – 15 December 1971) was a renowned cardiologist and a published medical researcher. He was the joint professor of Cardiology and Internal Medicine at Dhaka Medical College and Hospital. He was noted for his progressive thinking and unconventional beliefs for a modern Bengali society. He was murdered in the intellectual killings during the 1971 genocide in Bangladesh by Pakistan army and its local collaborators, including the Al-Badr militia.

== Biography ==
Rabbee was born on 21 September 1932, in Pabna District, Bengal Presidency, British India (now Bangladesh). He was known as an exceptional student. In 1948, he passed matriculation from Pabna Zilla School and HSC from Dhaka College in 1950. Afterwards, he went to Dhaka Medical College and finished his MBBS in 1955. He was the youngest medical graduate of his time. Rabbee was awarded a gold medal for achieving highest marks on the examination in all of Pakistan. At Dhaka Medical College and Hospital, he became an assistant surgeon on 15 December 1956.

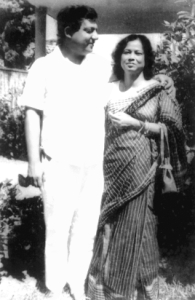
Rabbee with his wife Jahan Ara Rabbee (November 1971)

Rabbee and Dr. Jahan Ara Rabbee were married on 8 January 1957. Jahan had been a student attending Dhaka Medical College at the time. They had four children, but the youngest child died soon after his birth.

Rabbee became Registrar of Medicine in 1959 at Dhaka Medical College. In March 1960, he travelled to England to earn higher education, where he earned an MRCP in cardiology and another one in internal medicine. Rabbee received these two post-graduate degrees in record time by 1962. In lieu of obtaining his MRCP from London, he worked at the Hammersmith Hospital. Upon graduation, he worked at Middlesex Hospital with Sir Francis Avery Jones, an eminent British gastroenterologist. After Rabbee finished his studies, he returned to East Pakistan on 1 January 1963, where he became an associate professor of medicine at the Dhaka Medical College. He was soon promoted as Professor of Medicine and Cardiology in 1968 and was the youngest MRCP staff member to achieve this promotion in Dhaka Medical College at the age of 36.

== Personal beliefs and political movements ==
According to his daughter Nusrat, Rabbee was a man of science with a progressive philosophy. The Language Movement in 1952 opened his eyes to the tyranny and repression of the Pakistani government against its Bengali-speaking citizens. The Pakistani administration used to suppress opposition and used to neglect their language, culture, and secular philosophy. The Bengali were used to be deprived in every sectors regarding promotions, ranks and benefits.

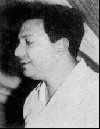
Rabbee in the 1969 speech at PG hospital

In 1969, at the post-graduate Institute of Medicine in Dhaka, he laid out his vision for a classless society. The speech by Pakistan's topmost professor in medicine evoked strong emotions from the students and colleagues. The captivating speech inspired everyone to provide good medical care for free to those who couldn't afford it. The Pakistani government took him in for questioning after the speech. The army charged that Rabbee was too popular.

In 1970 when the repression of East Pakistanis reached a peak, Rabbee received the Pakistan best professor award which he refused to accept. On 27 March 1971, he became very disturbed when he visited Dhaka medical college (his workplace) with his wife and saw the extent of the massacre committed by Pakistani army on innocent civilians and the faculty of Dhaka university. Both he and his wife provided medical care, surgery, money, shelter and transportation cost to refugee camps to families of those who were killed, as well as for survivors of torture and rape.

Early in December 1971, Rabbee cautioned poet and activist Sufia Kamal to leave Dhaka, but he himself did not leave and was caught by the Pakistani Army and its collaborators. According to Kamal, he was one of the intellectuals and other important people who "proved their patriotism to their motherland by sacrificing their lives".

== Research ==
Rabbee was a clinician and medical researcher. He became known across the Indian subcontinent for treating patients with complex medical conditions who had not received a diagnosis or successful treatment elsewhere. Rabbee combined a holistic approach to health with recent developments in medical science. For patients who could not afford treatment, he provided free medical treatment, medicine, transportation, and hospitalization costs. Child and elderly patients have been noted as responding positively to his approach, as he spent time interacting with them and addressing the underlying causes of their clinical symptoms.

Rabbee also did research on medicine, and has had his research-based articles published in the British Medical Journal and The Lancet. His publications include "A Case of Congenital Hyperbilirubinaemia (Dubin-Johnson Syndrome) in Pakistan" and "Spirometry in Tropical Pulmonary Eosinophilia".

== Death ==
On 15 December 1971, Rabbee was brutally killed when the Bangladesh War of Independence was ending. The Pakistan army and those that conspired with them took Rabbee from his home. He was taken to Mohammedpur Physical Training Institute and then to Rayer Bazar along with other intellectuals where they were martyred.

Jahan Ara Rabbee (widow of Fazle Rabbee) talked about his death:

On 15 December the curfew was relaxed for two hours. Despite his wife's objection he had gone to see a non-Bengali patient in the old part of Dhaka. He had bought plenty of vegetables on his way back. Though his wife requested him repeatedly to move out from the house at 75, Shiddeshwari, he did not agree. On that fateful day he took some rest after lunch. In the afternoon, members of Pakistan army, Al Badar and Rajakars circled his house. They came in a microbus and a jeep. About six soldiers took him towards the jeep. As his wife came out running they pointed a gun at her and stopped her from advancing any further. Rabbee walked towards the jeep with his head held high. It was known that on 15 December midnight Rabbee along with some other intellectuals were taken in a truck from the Lalmatia Physical Training Institute to the Rayerbazar brickfield and murdered in a brutal manner. His dead body was identified on 18 December.

The president of Pabna Drama Circle and a leading cultural activist, Gopal Sanyal, said, "When the occupation forces realized that Bangladesh was about to become independent, they killed off the intellectuals who were the greatest minds of the country. These great human beings never got to see the sun rise over the independent Bangladesh."

On 3 November 2013, Chowdhury Mueen-Uddin, based in London, and Ashrafuz Zaman Khan, based in the US, were sentenced in absentia after the court found that they were involved in the abduction and murders of 18 people – nine Dhaka University teachers, six journalists and three physicians including Dr Fazle Rabbee – in December 1971.

== Legacy ==
- In 1972, the boys hostel of the Dhaka Medical College was named as Dr. Fazle Rabbi Hall.
- In 2015, the Municipal corporation of Dhaka north renamed the revitalized Gulshan South Park as the Shahid Dr. Fazle Rabbi Park.
