= Abul Khair (Bengali intellectual) =

Bengali educator

- আবুল খায়ের
- Born: 1 April 1929; Gosantara, Kawkhali thana, Barisal district, British India
- Died: 14 December 1971 (aged 42); Dacca, East Pakistan
- Education: University of California, Berkeley (MA, PhD)
- Occupation: Educator
- Spouse: Sayeda Khair
- Children: 4

Abul Khair (1 April 1929 – 14 December 1971) was a Bengali educator.

== Biography ==
Khair was born on 1 April 1929 in Gosantara, Kawkhali thana, Barisal district, British India (now in Kawkhali Upazila, Pirojpur District, Bangladesh). He was the youngest son of Moulvi Mohammad Abdur Rashed. Khair matriculated from Pirojpur Government High School in 1945 and studied at Presidency College, Calcutta. He completed a BA and MA in history at the University of Dacca in 1950 and 1951, respectively.

Khair was a lecturer in history at Fazlul Huq College, Chakhar, and Jagannath College. He joined the department of history at the University of Dacca in 1955 as a junior lecturer. A fellowship from The Asia Foundation made further studies in history possible in the United States. At the University of California, Berkeley, he earned a second MA. That was followed in 1962 by a PhD for his dissertation, United States foreign policy in the Indo-Pakistan subcontinent, 1940-1955.

He returned to the University of Dacca, where he taught American and European history. An enthusiastic supporter of the independence movement of Bangladesh, he was an activist inside the university organizing movements for the autonomy of the university and the non-cooperation movement.

=== Death ===
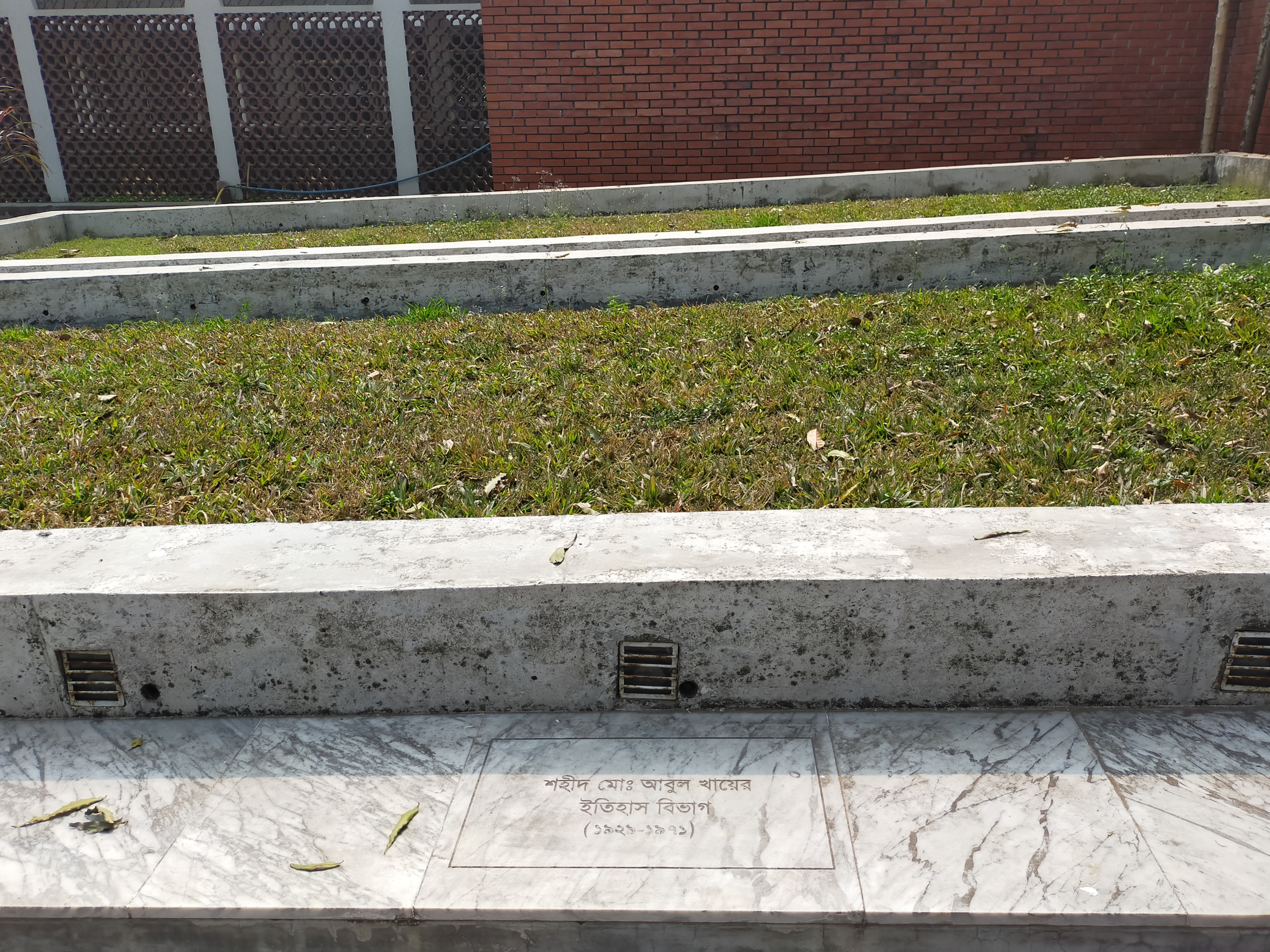
Grave of Abul Khair by the side of Dhaka University central mosque.

Khair was picked up by the Pakistani army sometime in August 1971, together with a few of the other Dacca University teachers. That time he was released after a month. He stayed back in his university flat from where he was picked up by the Al Badrs on 10 December, never to return. He was murdered. Khair's mutilated body was found gagged and blindfolded with a bedsheet 21 days later at an abandoned brick kiln at Rayer Bazar. It was his wife Sayeda's chador that led to his identity being established. He was buried in the compound of the Dacca University Central mosque.

On the same site at Rayer Bazar lay bodies of dozens of other intellectuals killed in the same way.

On 3 November 2013, Chowdhury Mueen-Uddin, a Muslim leader based in London, and Ashrafuz Zaman Khan, based in the US, were sentenced in absentia. The court found that they were involved in the abduction and murders of 18 people—nine Dacca University teachers (including Khair), six journalists, and three physicians—in December 1971.

== See also ==
- 1971 Bangladesh atrocities
