= Ghyasuddin Ahmed =

Bengali educator

Shahid Ghyasuddin Ahmed
- গিয়াসউদ্দিন আহমেদ
- Born: 1933 (Note: A brief 2006 profile in The Daily Star states that Ahmed was born in 1935, but all other sources say 1933. A. M. Chowdhury wrote in a December 1971 obituary in The Journal of the Asiatic Society of Bangladesh, and repeated later in Banglapedia, that Ahmed was born on 11 August 1933. A memorial volume published by the University of Dhaka says 12 August 1933. The local government website for Amdia Union says 11 September 1933.); Belabo, Narsinghdi sub-division, British India
- Died: 14 December 1971 (aged 37–38); Nakhalpara, Dhaka, Bangladesh
- Resting place: Shahbag, Dhaka, Bangladesh
- Other names: Bacchu Da
- Occupation: History professor
- Known for: Martyred intellectual

Ghyasuddin Ahmed (Bengali: গিয়াসউদ্দিন আহমেদ; 1933 – 14 December 1971), also known by his daak naam Bacchu Da (Bengali: বাচ্চু দা), was a Bengali educator.

== Early life ==
Ahmed was born in Belabo, Narsinghdi sub-division, British India (now in Amdia Union, Narsingdi Sadar Upazila, Bangladesh). There is ambiguity about his date of birth, but almost all sources agree that it was in 1933. His father was Abdul Gafur, a sub-deputy magistrate. His mother was Ratna Garbha Begum Shamsunnahar. He had two brothers and five sisters. His younger brother, Rashiduddin Ahmad, would become a neurosurgeon.

Ahmed passed matriculation by obtaining eighth place from St. Gregory High School, Dhaka, in 1950 and I.A. from Notre Dame College in 1952 by obtaining tenth place. He passed B.A. (Hons) and M.A. in history from Dhaka University in 1957. In his university days, he was a chess champion and captain of the basketball team of S. M. Hall.

== Career ==
Ahmed joined Jagannath College (now Jagannath University) as a lecturer in the history department and later joined Dhaka University in 1958. He went to the United Kingdom with a Commonwealth Scholarship in 1964 and obtained an Honours degree in world history from the London School of Economics (LSE).

=== Role in Liberation War ===
Ahmed collected medicine and food and delivered those to posts, such as Sufia Kamal's house, which supplied freedom fighters for their training.

== Death ==
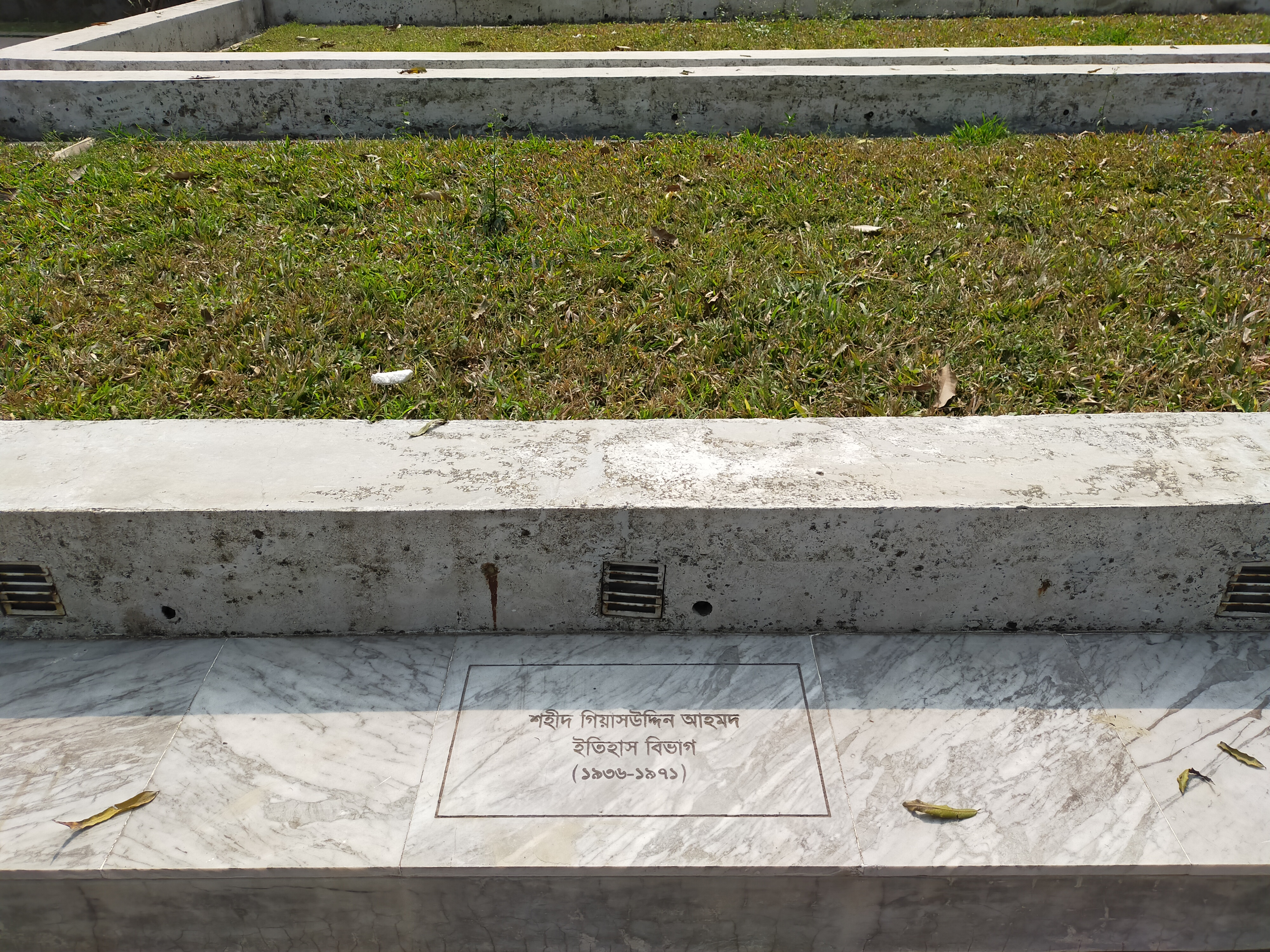
Grave of Ghyasuddin Ahmed by the side of Dhaka University central mosque

Accused of helping in the Bangladesh Liberation War, he was taken to Dhaka Cantonment in 1971 for questioning. He was released after a few days. Then again on 14 December 1971, he was picked up from Mohsin Hall by the Pakistani paramilitary Al Badar forces. On 4 January 1972, his clothes and mutilated body were identified in the Mirpur area.

On 3 November 2013, Chowdhury Mueen-Uddin, a Muslim leader based in London, and Ashrafuz Zaman Khan, based in the US, were sentenced in absentia after the court found that they were involved in the abduction and murders of 18 people - nine Dhaka University teachers, including Ahmed; six journalists; and three physicians – in December 1971.

== See also ==
- 1971 Bangladesh atrocities
