= Faizul Mahi =

Bangladeshi intellectual (1939–1971)

- ফয়জুল মাহি
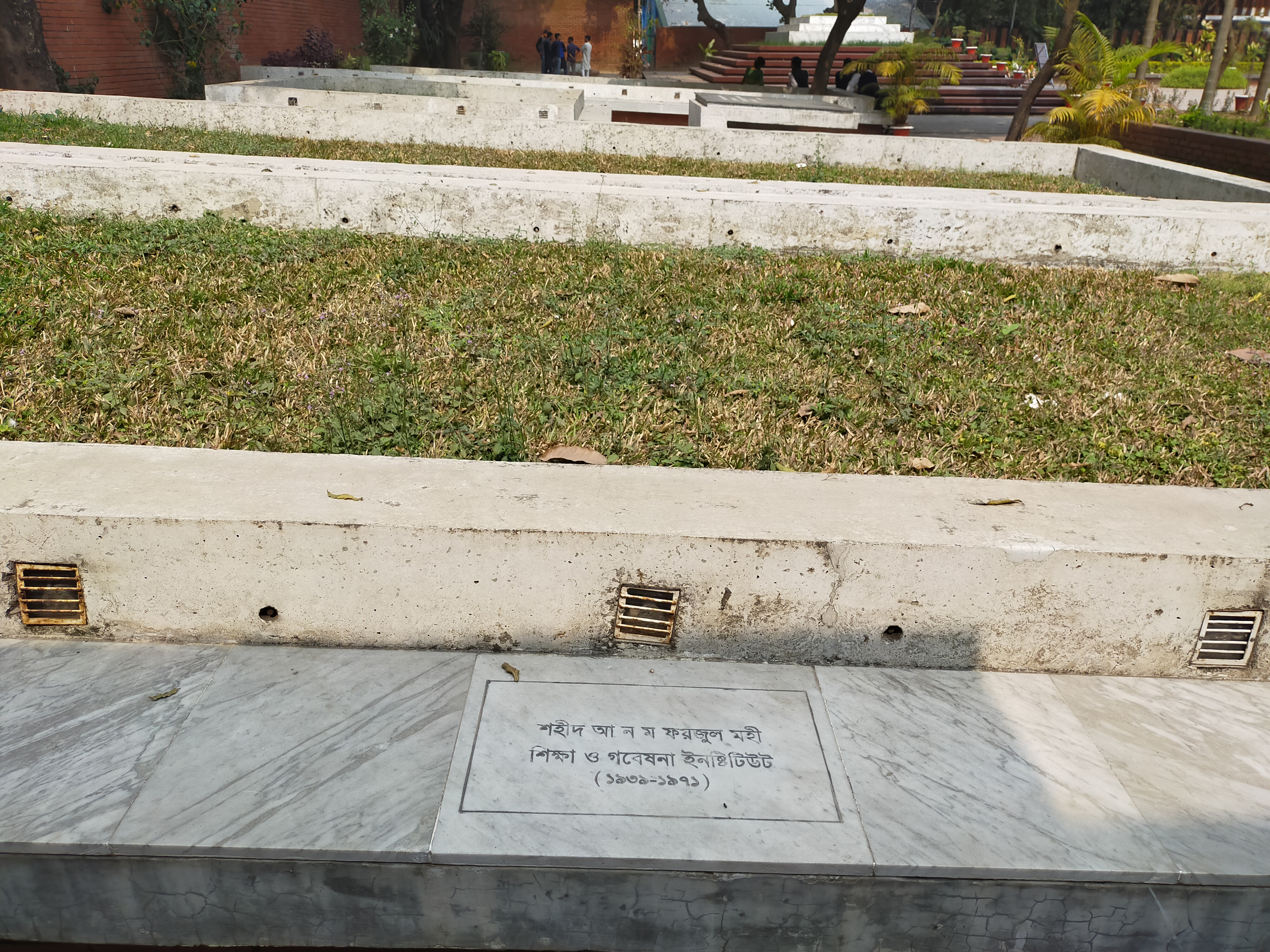
- Grave of Dr. ANM Faizul Mahi by the side of Dhaka University central mosque, a martyred intellectual.
- Pronunciation: Phaẏajula Māhi
- Born: 26 March 1939; Feni, Bengal, British India
- Died: 14 December 1971 (aged 32); Nakhalpara, Dhaka, Bangladesh
- Resting place: Shahbag, Dhaka, Bangladesh
- Known for: Martyred Intellectual

Faizul Mahi, (Bengali: ফয়জুল মহি; 1939–1971) born in the district of Feni, was a Bangladeshi educationist. He was one of eighteen victims of an abduction and murder ploy conducted by the Pakistani paramilitary, Al Badr.

Mahi joined the Institute of Education and Research in 1968 after obtaining an Ed.D. and became senior lecturer. He was dedicated to the cause of 1971 Bangladesh liberation war that was going on from March to December, helping the freedom fighters from within.

Al Badr, the paramilitary force of Pakistani military picked him up on 14 December 1971 from his home.

On 3 November 2013, Chowdhury Mueen-Uddin, a Muslim leader based in London, and Ashrafuz Zaman Khan, based in the US, were sentenced in absentia after the court found that they were involved in the abduction and murders of 18 people – nine Dhaka University teachers (including Faizul Mahi), six journalists and three physicians – in December 1971.

== See also ==
- 1971 Bangladesh atrocities
