= Nizamuddin Ahmed =

Nizamuddin Ahmad
- নিজাম উদ্দিন আহমেদ
- Photo of Nizamuddin Ahmed
- Born: 22 September 1929; Bikrampur, Bengal, British India
- Disappeared: 12 December 1971 (aged 42); Mirpur, Dhaka, Bangladesh
- Status: Declared dead in absentia
- Education: Economics (BA)
- Alma mater: University of Dhaka
- Known for: Martyred Intellectual

Nizamuddin Ahmed, (Bengali: নিজাম উদ্দিন আহমেদ; c. 1929 – 12 December 1971) was a Bangladeshi journalist. On 12 December 1971, he was abducted and killed by an Al-Badr activists team. He was awarded Ekushey Padak posthumously in 1993 by the Government of Bangladesh.

== Education and career ==
Ahmed was born in the district of Munshiganj. He passed Matriculation examination from Kazirpagla Abhoykumar Talukdar School and Intermediate examination from Haraganga College in Munshiganj. He earned a BA degree in economics from the University of Dhaka in 1952.

Ahmad served in the Civil and Military Gazette of Lahore, Daily Millat in Dhaka and Associated Press of Pakistan (APP). He joined the Pakistan Press International (PPI) in 1959. He became the general manager of PPI in 1971. Besides, he worked as the Dhaka correspondent of United Press International (UPI), BBC and Associated Press of America.

Ahmad was a member of organizations like Tuberculosis Association, Central Jute Board and Film Censor Board.

== Activities in liberation war of Bangladesh ==
Nizamuddin Ahmed was an ardent supporter of the Liberation War of Bangladesh. He used to send news items on the atrocities of the Pakistani forces to various foreign news media. He had taken New York Times journalist McBrown to a guerrilla camp to collect authentic news. He provided BBC with authentic news under strict censorship. For this reason he was taken to General Rao Forman Ali's office on two occasions.

== Death ==
On 12 December 1971, Nizamuddin was taking his lunch when members of Al-Badr picked him up from his residence. His body was never found.

On 3 November 2013, Chowdhury Mueen-Uddin, a Muslim leader based in London, and Ashrafuz Zaman Khan, based in the US, were sentenced in absentia after the court found that they were involved in the abduction and murders of 18 people – six journalists including Nizamuddin Ahmed, nine Dhaka University teachers and three physicians – in December 1971.

== See also ==
- 1971 Bangladesh atrocities
