= Santosh Chandra Bhattacharya =

History professor (1915 - 1971)

Santosh Chandra Bhattacharyya
- সন্তোষচন্দ্র ভট্টাচার্য
- Santosh Chandra Bhattacharyya
- Born: 30 August 1915; Nawabganj, Bengal, British India
- Died: 14 December 1971 (aged 56); Nakhalpara, Dhaka, Bangladesh
- Occupation: Scholar
- Known for: Martyred Intellectual
- Parent(s): Kshitish Chandra Bhattacharyya; Sarajubala Devi

Santosh Chandra Bhattacharyya (Bengali: সন্তোষচন্দ্র ভট্টাচার্য) (30 August 1915 – 14 December 1971) was a senior lecturer of the department of history at the University of Dhaka, who was killed by an Al Badr squad on 14 December 1971.

== Early life ==
Bhattacharya came from a Bengali Hindu Brahmin family known for the tradition of studying Sanskrit. He was born on 30 August 1915 in the village of Jantrail on other side of the Buriganga opposite to Dhaka. His birthplace is now under Nawabganj Upazila of Dhaka District. Bhattacharya graduated in history with honours from Dhaka University. In 1938, he completed his master's degree in history from Dhaka University.

== Career ==
In 1938, Bhattacharya started his career as a lecturer of history at the Jagannath College. In 1949, he joined the Dhaka University as lecturer in history. A few years later he was promoted to the position of senior lecturer. Bhattacharya's area of expertise was the Mauryan period of the Indian history, with special expertise on the works of Chanakya.

== Assassination ==
On 25 March 1971, when the Pakistan Army launched Operation Searchlight in Dhaka, Bhattacharya escaped to his ancestral village in Jantrail. However, he had to join the university under the directive of the army. He refused to leave Bangladesh and take refuge in India. On 14 December 1971, a squad of Al Badr militia abducted him from his Isa Khan residence in Dhaka. His dead body was discovered from Rayer Bazaar killing field.
