= Anwar Pasha =

Bangladeshi writer (1928–1971)

- আনোয়ার পাশা
- Born: 15 April 1928; Murshidabad, Bengal, British India (currently in West Bengal, India)
- Died: 14 December 1971 (aged 43); Nakhalpara, Dhaka, Bangladesh
- Resting place: Shahbag, Dhaka, Bangladesh
- Education: University of Dhaka
- Occupation: Novelist
- Known for: Martyred Intellectual
- Spouse: Masina Begam (m. 1953–1971)
- Awards: Bangla Academy Literary Award

Anwar Pasha (1928–1971) was a Bangladeshi novelist. He was killed in 1971.

== Life ==
Anwar Pasha was born in the village Dabkai in Murshidabad (currently in West Bengal, India). He passed the High Madrassah examination in 1946 then went on to do his BA and then his MA in Bengali from Calcutta University in 1953. He started his career as teacher of Manikchak High Madrasah and later on taught at Bhabta Azizia High Madrasah in 1954 and Sadikhan Diar Bohumukhi Higher Secondary School in 1957. In 1958 he joined Pabna Edward College and in 1966 he joined Department of Bengali, Dhaka University.

== Family ==
Pasha married Masina Begam in 1953. Masina was the daughter of Junab Hekmat Ali who was of Palitberia village of Nadia, West Bengal.Anwar and Masina had 2 children, Masarul Aftab, Robiul Aftab.

== Literary career ==
Pasha's literary career started when he was a student at Calcutta University. At that time, he published "Hasnahena", an anthology of several literary essays. He later moved to writing short stories, novels, essays, and poems. With Muhammad Abdul Hai, he also edited and published four medieval Bengali epics.

== Works ==
- Nadi Nihshesita Hale (1963)
- Nirupay Harini (1970)
- Rabindra Chhotagalpa Samiksa (Vol. I 1963, Vol. II 1973)
- Sahityashilpi Abul Fazal (1968)
- Samudra Sankhalata Ujjayini (1974).

=== Novels ===
- Neer Sondhani (Home Seeker, 1968)
- Nishuti Rater Gantha (Epics of the Dead of the Night, 1968)
- Rifle Roti Aorat (Rifles, Bread and Women, 1973, A legendary work )

== Awards ==
- Bangla Academy Literary Award (Posthumously 1972)
- Independence Award - 2020

== Death ==
In 1971 a few days before 16 December, he was picked up from his university flat by Pakistan Army and its collaborators (the Al-Badr militia led by Matiur Rahman Nizami), and taken to Mirpur, where he along with other intellectuals was executed. His body was recovered later and buried in the compound of the Dhaka University Central mosque.

On 3 November 2013, the International Crimes Tribunal - a special Bangladeshi court set up by the government - sentenced Chowdhury Mueen-Uddin and Ashrafuz Zaman Khan to death after the tribunal found them guilty in absentia of torture and murder of 18 intellectuals including Anwar Pasha during 1971 Liberation war of Bangladesh.

== Gallery ==
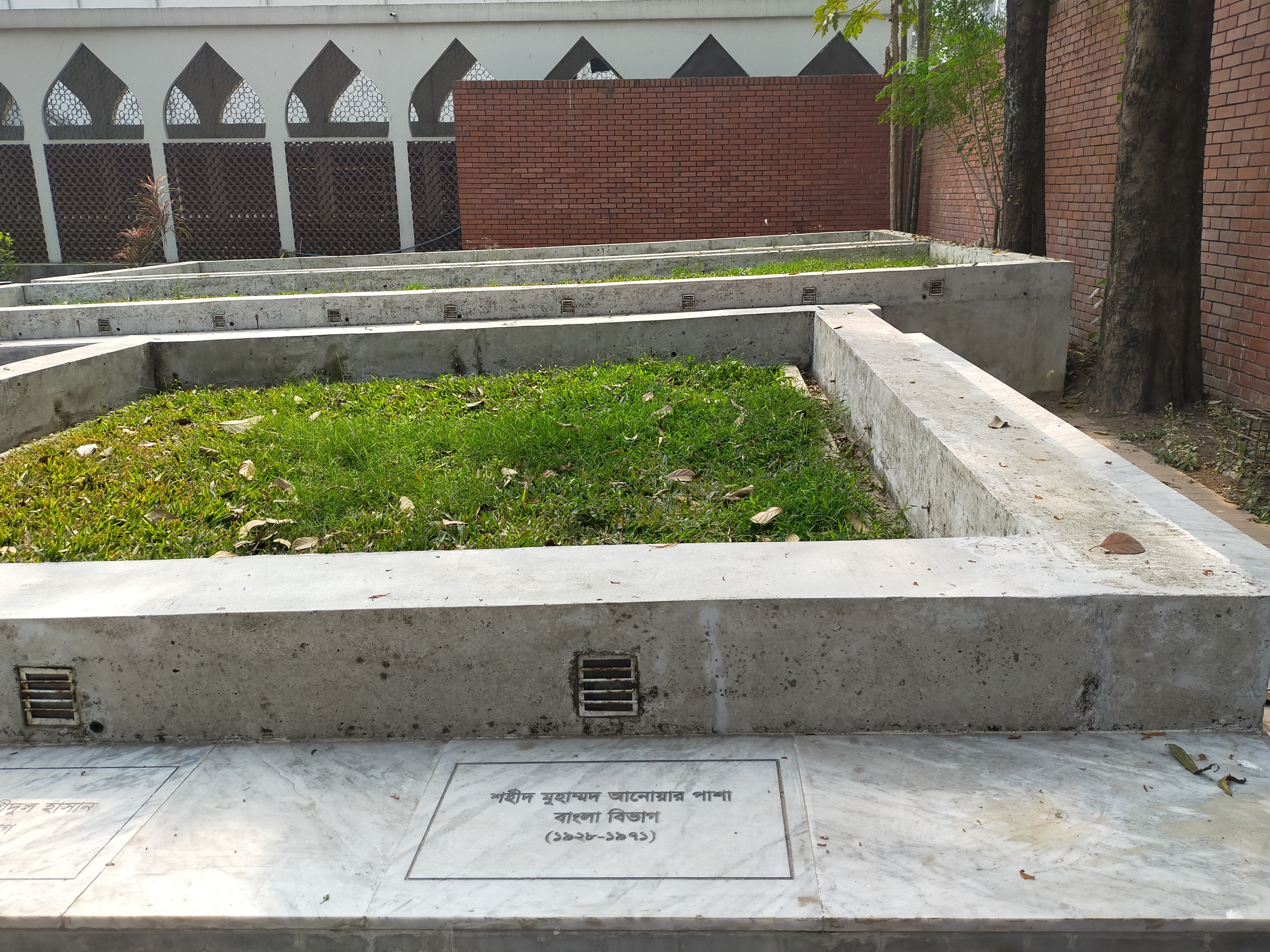
Grave of Anwar Pasha by the side of Dhaka University central mosque.
