= Al-Badr (East Pakistan) =

Paramilitary organisation

- Bengali: আল-বদর; Urdu: البدر
- Founder: Rao Farman Ali
- Leader: Muhammad Ashraf Hossain
- Founded: September 1971
- Dates active: 1971
- Dissolved: 16 December 1971; 54 years ago
- Allegiance: Pakistan
- Headquarters: East Pakistan
- Ideology: Pan-Islamism; Pakistani nationalism; Muslim nationalism; Anti-Separatism; Anti-Indian sentiment
- Political position: Far-right
- Status: Dissolved
- Part of: Islami Jamiat-e-Talaba
- Wars: Bangladesh War of Independence

The Al-Badr (Bengali: আল-বদর, romanised: āl-badara; Urdu: البدر, romanised: al-badar, lit. 'The Full moon') was an East Pakistani militia composed mainly of pro-Pakistan militants (mostly Muslim Biharis and Muhajirs), which operated in East Pakistan against the Bengali nationalist movement during the Bangladesh War of Independence, under the patronage of the Government of Pakistan.

== Etymology ==
The name 'Al-Badr' means the full moon and refers to the Battle of Badr.

== History ==
=== Organisation ===
Al-Badr and Al-Shams were formed by the Pakistan Army lead Government, Head organizer is unknown( Someone Birari) but pro Indian think tanker claimed that the head organizer was Motiur Rahman Nizami but they have no conclusive evidence. They operated in September 1971, under the auspices of General Amir Abdullah Khan Niazi, then chief of the Pakistan Army eastern command. The Pakistan army command initially planned to use locally recruited militias (Al-Badr, Razakar, Al-Shams) for policing cities of East Pakistan, and regular army units to defend the border with India. According to Brigadier Abdul Rahman Siddiqi, members of Al-Badr were mainly Biharis.

Despite their similarities in opposing the independence of Bangladesh, the Razakar and Al-Badr had differences; Razakars opposed the Mukti Bahini in general, while Al-Badr's tactics were terrorism and political killings. All three groups operated under Pakistani command.

=== Dissolution ===
After the surrender of the Pakistan Army on 16 December 1971, Al-Badr was dissolved together with the Razakar and Al-Shams. Many members were arrested. During the 1972-1975 regime of Sheikh Mujibur Rahman, all of the collaborators, including those of Al-Badr were pardoned conditionally.

== War crimes ==
Al-Badr were involved in atrocities against civilians during the war of 1971 in particular, the massacre of intellectuals, that occurred in Rayer Bazaar, Dhaka on 15 December 1971. According to journalist Azadur Rahman Chandan, Al-Badr was experimentally launched in Jamalpur, Mymensingh in April 1971 as a voluntary force with Islami Chhatra Sangha later reorganised as Islami Chhatra Shibir activists as its first recruits to wage war against the nationalist fighters.

== Leaders of Al-Badr ==
- Motiur Rahman Nizami was convicted of war crimes and executed on 11 May 2016
- Mir Quasem Ali was convicted of war crimes and executed on 3 September 2016
- Ashrafuz Zaman Khan
- Chowdhury Mueen-Uddin
- Ali Ahsan Mohammad Mojaheed was convicted of war crimes and executed on 22 November 2015.

== See also ==
- List of massacres in Bangladesh
