= 1971 in Bangladesh =

- Centuries: 20th; 21st
- Decades: 1950s; 1960s; 1970s; 1980s; 1990s
- See also: 1971 in Pakistan; 1971 in East Pakistan; Other events in 1971; List of years in Bangladesh

1971 (MCMLXXI) was a common year starting on Friday of the Gregorian calendar, the 1971st year of the Common Era (CE) and Anno Domini (AD) designations, the 971st year of the 2nd millennium, the 71st year of the 20th century, and the 2nd year of the 1970s decade.

The year 1971 was the year when Bangladesh achieved independence and emerged as a sovereign country.

== Incumbents ==
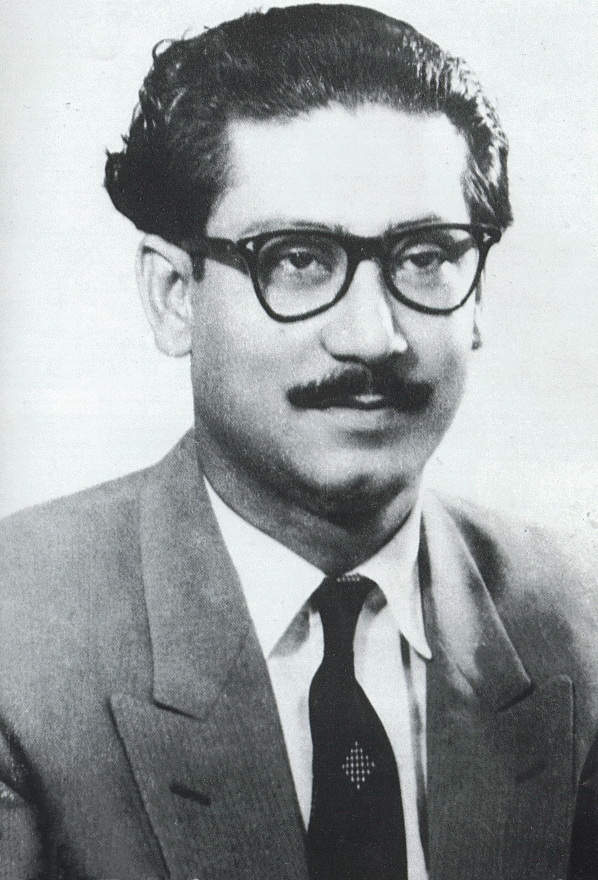
Mujibur
Rahman

- President: Sheikh Mujibur Rahman (starting 17 April)
- Prime Minister: Tajuddin Ahmad (starting 17 April)
- Vice President: Syed Nazrul Islam (starting 17 April)

== Events ==
=== March ===
- 2 March – First hoisting of the National flag of Bangladesh (1971) at the Dhaka University by Vice President of Dhaka University Students' Union (DUCSU) leader, A. S. M. Abdur Rab.
- 7 March – Sheikh Mujibur Rahman makes his historic freedom speech.
- 25 March – Pakistan Army launches Operation Searchlight at midnight on the 25th, marking the start of the 1971 Bangladesh atrocities. Sheikh Mujibur Rahman declares the independence of Bangladesh
- 26 March – Sheikh Mujibur Rahman is arrested by the Pakistan army.
- 27 March – Major Ziaur Rahman broadcasts the Bangladesh declaration of independence on his name over the radio.
- 30 March – Major Ziaur Rahman broadcasts the Bangladesh declaration of independence on behalf of Sheikh Mujibur Rahman over the radio.
- 31 March – Battle of Kushtia

=== April ===
- 2 April – Jinjira genocide, which took place at the unions Jinjira, Kalindi and Shubhadya of Keraniganj Upazila across the Buriganga River from Dhaka.
- 10 April – Formation of a provisional Bangladesh government-in-exile.
- 12 April – M. A. G. Osmani takes command of the Bangladesh Armed Forces.
- 17 April – The government-in-exile takes oath at Mujibnagar.
- 18 April – Battle of Daruin, Comilla and Battle of Rangamati-Mahalchari waterway, Chittagong Hill Tracts.

=== May ===
- 5 May – Gopalpur massacre which took place at Gopalpur municipality of Lalpur Upazila, Natore
- 20 May – Chuknagar massacre at Dumuria in Khulna.
- 24 May – Swadhin Bangla Betar Kendra radio station established in Kolkata.

=== July ===
- 11 July – Sector Commanders' Conference 1971 (to 17 July).

=== August ===
- 16 August – Operation Jackpot, Bangladesh naval commando operation.
- 20 August – Flight Lieutenant Matiur Rahman attempts to defect after hijacking a fighter plane.

=== September ===
- 5 September – Battle of Goahati, Jessore.
- 28 September – Bangladesh Air Force functional.

=== October ===
- 13 October – Dhaka guerrillas kill Abdul Monem Khan, governor of East Pakistan.
- 28 October – Battle of Dhalai Outpost, Srimongol.

=== November ===
- 9 November – Six small ships constitute the first fleet of Bangladesh Navy.
- 16 November – Battle of Ajmiriganj, an 18‑hour encounter between MB Freedom Fighters and the Pakistan army.
- 20 November – Battle of Garibpur between India and the Pakistan Army. (to 21 November)
- 21 November – Mitro Bahini, a joint force of Bangladesh and Indian troops formed.
- 22 November – Battle of Boyra, involving Pakistani and Indian air force.

=== December ===
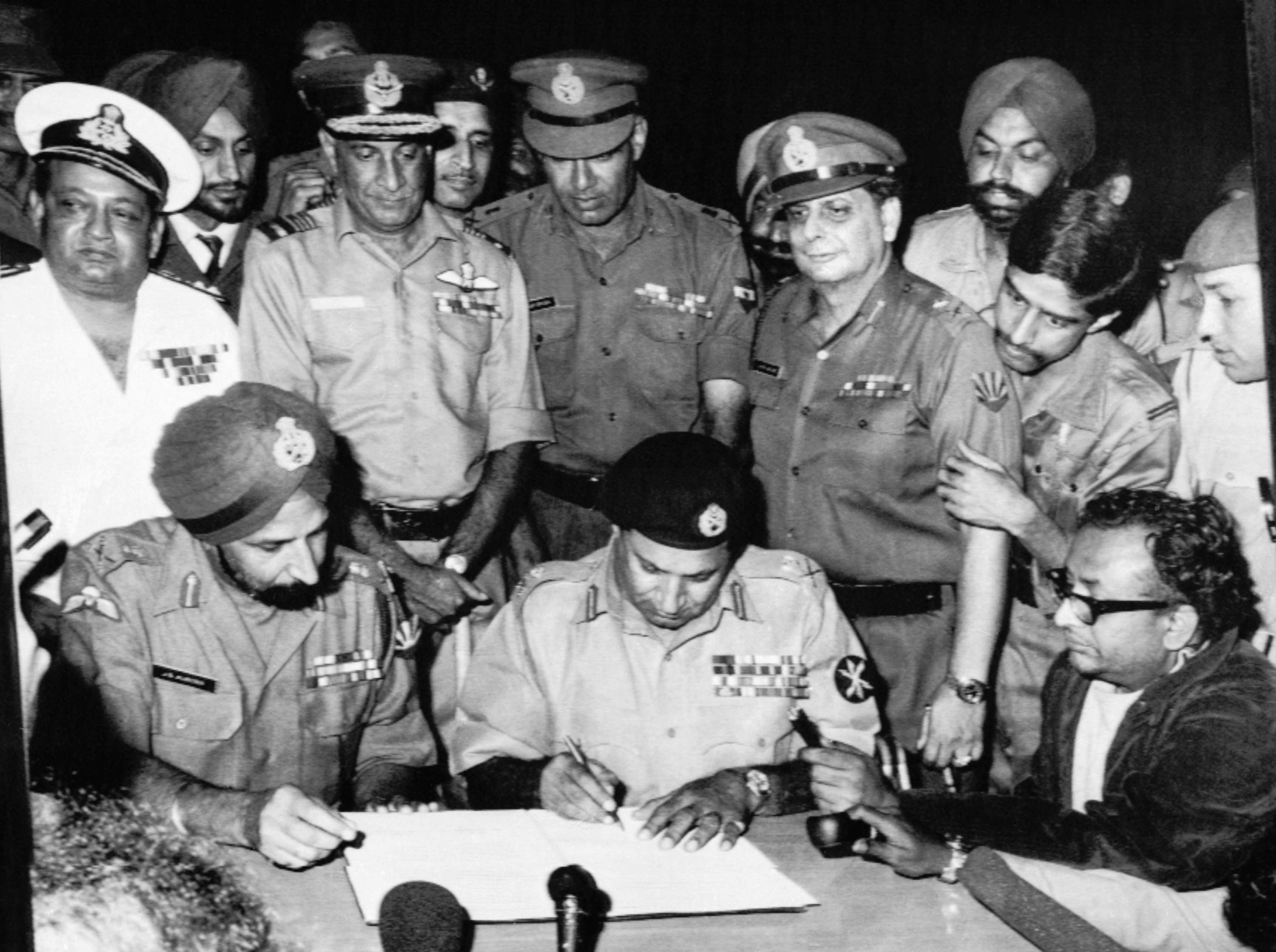
Lieutenant-General A. A. K. Niazi, the commander of Pakistan Eastern Command, signing the instrument of surrender in Dhaka on 16 Dec 1971, in the presence of India's Lt. Gen. Jagjit Singh Aurora.

- 3 December – Indo-Pakistani War of 1971 breaks out. Bangladesh Air Force destroys Pakistani oil depots.
- 4 December – India officially invades East Pakistan.
- 6 December – India becomes the first country to recognize the People’s Republic of Bangladesh. Swadhin Bangla Betar Kendra radio station becomes Bangladesh Betar
- 7 December – Liberation of Jessore, Sylhet and the Moulovi Bazar.
- 9 December – Chandpur and Daudkandi liberated.
- 10 December – Liberation of Laksham. Two Bangladeshi ships sunk mistakenly by Indian air attack.
- 11 December – Liberation of Hilli, Mymensingh, Kushtia and Noakhali.
- 14 December – 1971 Dacca University massacre, resulting in 200 deaths. Liberation of Bogra.
- 16 December – The Pakistani army’s capitulation. Liberation of the modern day Bangladeshi capital, Dhaka.
- 22 December – The provisional government of Bangladesh arrives in Dhaka from exile.

=== Sports ===
The Shadhin Bangla Football Team was formed by Bangladesh Krira Samity of the Bangladeshi government in exile shortly after the start of liberation war in 1971. This is the first instance of a Bangladesh national football team in any form. The team toured throughout India playing a total of 16 friendly matches to raise international awareness and economic support for the liberation war.

The Shadhin Bangla football team captain Zakaria Pintoo, was the first person to hoist the Bangladesh flag outside the territorial Bangladesh. By the end of the 16th match the team had contributed Tk 5 lac to Muktijuddho Fund in 1971.

== Climate ==
Climate data for Bangladesh in 1971
Month	Jan	Feb	Mar	Apr	May	Jun	Jul	Aug	Sep	Oct	Nov	Dec	Year
Daily mean °C (°F)	18.2 (64.8)	19.8 (67.6)	24.5 (76.1)	26.2 (79.2)	27.2 (81.0)	27.4 (81.3)	27.2 (81.0)	26.9 (80.4)	27.7 (81.9)	26.6 (79.9)	22.2 (72.0)	19.4 (66.9)	24.5 (76.1)
Average precipitation mm (inches)	12.5 (0.49)	7.3 (0.29)	10.6 (0.42)	47.3 (1.86)	141.8 (5.58)	335.7 (13.22)	486.4 (19.15)	469. (18.5)	283. (11.1)	162.1 (6.38)	72. (2.8)	.2 (0.01)	2,028 (79.8)
Source: Climatic Research Unit (CRU) of University of East Anglia (UEA)

== Births ==
- 9 February - Khan Asifur Rahman Agun, musician
- 23 March – Bipasha Hayat, actor and painter
- 27 July – Sajeeb Wazed Joy, businessman and politician, son of Sheikh Hasina and grandchild of Sheikh Mujibur Rahman
- 19 September - Salman Shah, actor

== Deaths ==
- 27 March - Fazlul Bari, politician (b. 1922)
- 9 September - Ghulam Sarwar Hussaini, religious leader

=== War Heroes ===
- 8 April - Bir Sreshtho Munshi Abdur Rouf, war hero (b. 1943)
- 18 April - Bir Sreshtho Mostafa Kamal, war hero (b. 1948)
- 20 August - Bir Sreshtho Matiur Rahman, war hero (b. 1930s)
- 28 October - Bir Sreshtho Hamidur Rahman, war hero (b. 1953)
- 5 September - Bir Sreshtho Nur Mohammad Sheikh, war hero (b. 1936)
- 10 December - Bir Sreshtho Mohammad Ruhul Amin, war hero (b. 1935)
- 14 December - Bir Sreshtho Mohiuddin Jahangir, war hero (b. 1949)

=== Martyred Intellectuals ===
- 25 March - Dr. AKM Asadul Haq, physician (b. 1928)
- 25 March - ANM Muniruzzaman, statistician (b. 1942)
- 25 March - Ataur Rahman Khan Khadim, physicist (b. 1933)
- 25 March - Dr. Fazlur Rahman Khan, geologist (b. 1939)
- 25 March - Dr. Govinda Chandra Dev, educationist (b. 1907)
- 25 March - Dr. Abdul Muktadir, geologist (b. 1940)
- 25 March - Nazmul Hoque Sarkar, lawyer, politician (b. 1937)
- 25 March - Sultanuddin Ahmed, engineer (b. 1935)
- 26 March - Mohammad Aminuddin, lawyer (b. 1921)
- 27 March - Meherun Nesa, poet (b. 1942)
- 29 March - Dhirendranath Datta, politician, lawyer (b. 1886)
- 29 March - Khondakar Abu Taleb, journalist (b. 1921)
- 30 March - Dr. Jyotirmoy Guhathakurta, educationist (b. 1920)
- 31 March - Shahid Saber, journalist (b. 1930)
- April - Muhammad Shafi, dentist (b. 1915)
- 8 April - Mohammad Shamshad Ali, physician (b. 1934)
- 9 April - Dr. Shamsuddin Ahmed, physician (b. 1920)
- 12 April - Dr. Jekrul Haque physician, politician (b. 1914)
- 14 April - Dr. Abul Fazal Ziaur Rahman, physician (b. 1926)
- 14 April - Sukharanjan Samaddar, educationist (b. 1938)
- 15 April - Muhammad Habibar Rahman, mathematician (b. 1940)
- 24 April - Dr. Suleman Khan, physician (b. 1939)
- 26 April - Dr. Mohammad Sadat Ali, educationist (b. 1942)
- 5 May - M Anwarul Azim, industrial administrator (b. 1931)
- 7 May - Ranadaprasad Saha, philanthropist (b. 1896)
- 13 May - Sheikh Abdus Salam, educationist (b. 1940)
- 29 May - Dr. Kosiruddin Talukder, physician (b. 1899)
- 28 August - Saroj Kumar Nath Adhikari, educationist (b. 1938)
- 30 August - Altaf Mahmud, lyricist and musician (b. 1933)
- 9 September - Khondakar Abul Kashem, educationist (b. 1944)
- 26 September - Dr. Atiqur Rahman, physician (b. 1931)
- 28 October - Mohammad Moazzem Hossain, educationist (b. 1952)
- 15 November - Dr. Azharul Haque, physician (b. 1940)
- 20 November - Dr. ABM Nurul Alam, physician (b. 1961)
- 25 November - Mir Abdul Qayyum, psychologist (b. 1939)
- December - Dr. Anwar Pasha, author (b. 1928)
- 11 December - ANM Golam Mostafa, journalist (b. 1942)
- 12 December - Nizamuddin Ahmed, journalist (b. 1929)
- 14 December - Dr. Faizul Mahi, educationist (b. 1939)
- 14 December - Dr. Ghyasuddin Ahmed, educationist (b. 1935)
- 14 December - Munier Chowdhury, educationist, author (b. 1925)
- 14 December - Dr. Mufazzal Haider Chaudhury, educationist, linguist (b. 1926)
- 14 December - Dr. M Abul Khair, educationist (b. 1929)
- 14 December - Dr. Mohammad Mortaza, physician (b. 1931)
- 14 December - Oliur Rahman, Islamic scholar (b. 1932)
- 14 December - Dr. Rashidul Hasan, educationist (b. 1932)
- 14 December - Dr. Sirajul Haque Khan, educationist (b. 1924)
- 14 December - Dr. Santosh Chandra Bhattacharyya, educationist (b. 1915)
- 14 December - Shahidullah Kaiser, journalist, author (b. 1927)
- 14 December - Selina Parvin, journalist, poet (b. 1931)
- 15 December - Dr. AFM Alim Chowdhury, ophthalmologist (b 1928)
- 15 December - Dr. Mohammed Fazle Rabbee, cardiologist (b. 1932)
- 16 December - Dr. Ayesha Bedora Choudhury, physician (b. 1935)

== See also ==
- List of Bangladeshi films of 1971
- Timeline of Bangladeshi history
