= 1971 killing of Bengali intellectuals =

War crime by the Pakistan Army during the Bangladesh War of Independence

- Part of the Bangladesh genocide
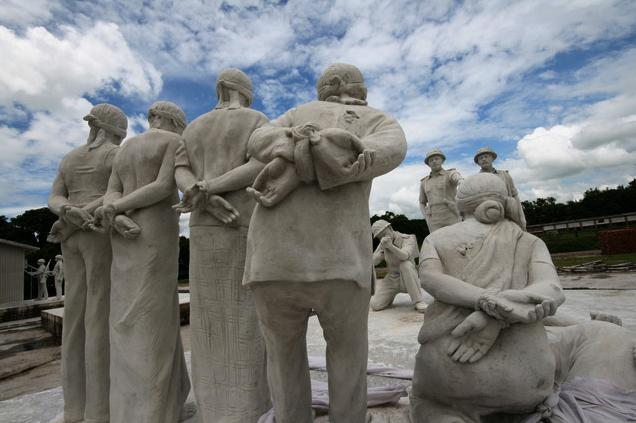
- A sculpture in Meherpur showing the execution of intellectuals by the Pakistan Army in 1971
- Location: East Pakistan
- Date: 25 March, 14 – 16 December 1971
- Target: Bengali intellectuals
- Attack type: Deportation; Ethnic cleansing; Mass murder; Genocidal massacre
- Deaths: 1,109 - 1,111
- Perpetrators: Pakistan Army; Rao Farman Ali; Shanti Committee; Razakars; Al-Badr; Al-Shams
- Motive: Anti-Bengali sentiment, destruction of Bengali Intelligentsia

In 1971, the Pakistan Army and their local collaborators, most notably far-right militia group Al-Badr, engaged in the genocidal massacre of Bengali intellectuals during the Bangladesh War of 1971. Bengali intellectuals were abducted, tortured, and killed during the entire duration of the war as part of the Bangladesh genocide. However, the largest number of systematic executions took place on 25 March and 14 December 1971, two dates that bookend the conflict. 14 December is commemorated in Bangladesh as Martyred Intellectuals Day.

== Black Night of 25 March ==
On 25 March 1971, the Pakistan army launched an extermination campaign, codenamed Operation Searchlight, against the Bengali people in East Pakistan. A number of professors, physicians, and journalists were abducted from their homes by armed Pakistani soldiers and their local collaborators, and executed during this operation and its aftermath.

== 14 December executions ==
Dead bodies of Bengali intellectuals found on 15 December 1971

As the war neared its end and Pakistani surrender became apparent, the Pakistan Army made a final effort to eliminate the intelligentsia of the new nation of Bangladesh. On 14 December 1971, over 200 Bengali intellectuals, including professors, journalists, doctors, artists, engineers, and writers, were abducted from their homes in Dhaka by the Al-Badr militia and the Pakistan Army. Novelist Shahidullah Kaiser and playwright Munier Choudhury were among the victims. They were taken blindfolded to torture cells in Mirpur, Mohammadpur, Nakhalpara, Rajarbagh, and other locations in different parts of the city. Later they were executed en masse, most notably at Rayerbazar and Mirpur. In memory of the martyred intellectuals, 14 December is mourned in Bangladesh as Shaheed Buddhijibi Dibosh, or Day of the Martyred Intellectuals.

After the independence of Bangladesh, a list of Bengali intellectuals was discovered on a page of Major General Rao Farman Ali's diary left behind at the Governor's House. The existence of such a list was confirmed by Ali himself, although he denied the motive of genocide. The same was also confirmed by Altaf Gauhar, a former Pakistani bureaucrat. He mentioned an incident in which Gauhar asked Ali to remove a friend's name from the list, and Ali did so in his presence.

== Notable victims ==
Many notable intellectuals who were killed from 25 March to 16 December 1971 in different parts of the country include:

- Abul Fazal Ziaur Rahman (physician)
- ABM Nurul Alam (physician)
- A. B. M. Abdur Rahim (labor union leader)
- AFM Alim Chowdhury (ophthalmologist)
- Ataur Rahman Khan Khadim (physicist)
- Atiqur Rahman (doctor)
- Azharul Haque (doctor)
- AKM Asadul Haq (doctor)
- Altaf Mahmud (lyricist and musician)
- ANM Golam Mostafa (journalist)
- ANM Muniruzzaman (statistician)
- Anwar Pasha (Bengali litterateur)
- Ayesha Bedora Choudhury
- Syed Nazmul Haque (journalist)
- Dhirendranath Datta (lawyer and politician)
- Faizul Mahi (educator)
- Fazlur Rahman Khan (geologist)
- Govinda Chandra Dev (philosophy)
- Ghyasuddin Ahmed (educator)
- Jyotirmoy Guhathakurta (scholar of English literature)
- Anudvaipayan Bhattacharya (physicist)
- Jekrul Haque (physician)
- Kalachand Roy (academic)
- Harinath Dey (biochemist)
- Khondakar Abu Taleb (journalist)
- Khondakar Abul Kashem (historian)
- Meherun Nesa (poet)
- Munier Chowdhury (Bengali literature)
- Mufazzal Haider Chaudhury (Bengali literature)
- Muhammad Habibar Rahman (mathematician)
- Mohammad Sadat Ali (businessperson)
- Mohammad Shamshad Ali (physician)
- Muhammad Shafi (dentist)
- Meher Ali (soil scientist, politician)
- M Abul Khair (historian)
- M Anwarul Azim (industrial administrator)
- Mir Abdul Qayyum (psychologist)
- Mohammed Fazle Rabbee (cardiologist)
- Mohammad Mortaza (doctor)
- Mohammad Moazzem Hossain (educator)
- Mohammad Aminuddin (lawyer)
- Abdul Muktadir (geologist)
- Nizamuddin Ahmed (journalist)
- Nazmul Hoque Sarkar (lawyer)
- Rashidul Hasan (English literature)
- Ranada Prasad Saha (philanthropist)
- Rakhal Chandra Das (physician)
- Sukharanjan Samaddar (Sanskrit)
- Jogesh Chandra Ghosh (scholar, Ayurveda practitioner, entrepreneur and philanthropist)
- Shahid Saber (journalist)
- Sheikh Abdus Salam (education)
- Sirajul Haque Khan
- Santosh Chandra Bhattacharya
- Shamsuddin Ahmed
- Laxman Das (wrestler, weight lifter, circus performer)
- Suleman Khan
- Sultanuddin Ahmed (engineer)
- Kosiruddin Talukder
- Shahidullah Kaiser (journalist)
- Selina Parvin (journalist)
- Bishnu Chattopadhyay (freedom fighter and leader of peasant movement)
- Saroj Kumar Nath Adhikari (economics)
- Sheikh Abdul Mannan (journalist)
- Shamsuddin Ahmed (physician)
- Oliur Rahman (Islamic scholar)

== Verdict on the killing ==
On 3 November 2013, a special court in Dhaka sentenced two former leaders of the al-Badr killing squad to death for war crimes committed in December 1971. Chowdhury Mueen-Uddin, based in London, and Ashrafuz Zaman Khan, based in the US, were sentenced in absentia after the court found that they were involved in the abduction and murders of 18 intellectuals – nine Dhaka University professors, six journalists, and three physicians – in December 1971. Prosecutors said the killings were carried out between 10 and 15 December, when Pakistan was losing the war in Bangladesh (then East Pakistan), and were part of a campaign intended to strip the new-born nation of its intellectuals.

On 2 November 2014, the International Crimes Tribunal, Bangladesh, sentenced Mir Quasem Ali to death for war crimes, which include the killings of intellectuals. It was proved in the tribunal that he was a key organiser of the Al-Badr, which planned and executed the killing of the intellectuals on 14 December 1971.

== Statistics ==
The number of intellectuals killed is estimated in Banglapedia as follows:

- Academics – 991
- Physicians – 49
- Lawyers – 42
- Journalists – 13
- Others (litterateurs, artists, and engineers) – 16

The district-wise break down of the number of martyred academics and lawyers published in 1972 was as follows –

District and division	Academics			Lawyers
District and division	Primary	Secondary	Higher secondary	Lawyers
Dhaka	37	8	10	6
Faridpur	27	12	4	3
Tangail	20	7	2	
Mymensingh	46	28	1	2
Dhaka Division	130	55	17	11
Chittagong	39	16	7	1
Chittagong Hill Tracts	9	4	1	1
Sylhet	19	7		2
Comilla	45	33	1	4
Noakhali	26	13	4	2
Chittagong Division	138	73	13	10
Khulna	48	15	2	2
Jessore	55	31	5	4
Barisal	50	21	4	
Patuakhali	3	1		
Kushtia	28	13	4	
Khulna Division	184	81	15	6
Rajshahi	39	8	3	5
Rangpur	41	22	9	4
Dinajpur	50	10	1	2
Bogra	14	12		2
Pabna	43	9	1	2
Rajshahi Division	187	61	14	15
Bangladesh	639	270	59	42
Martyred academics (not affiliated to universities) = 968
Martyred university teachers = 21
Total martyred academics = 989

Administrative districts and divisions mentioned here are as they were in 1972.

== Commemoration ==
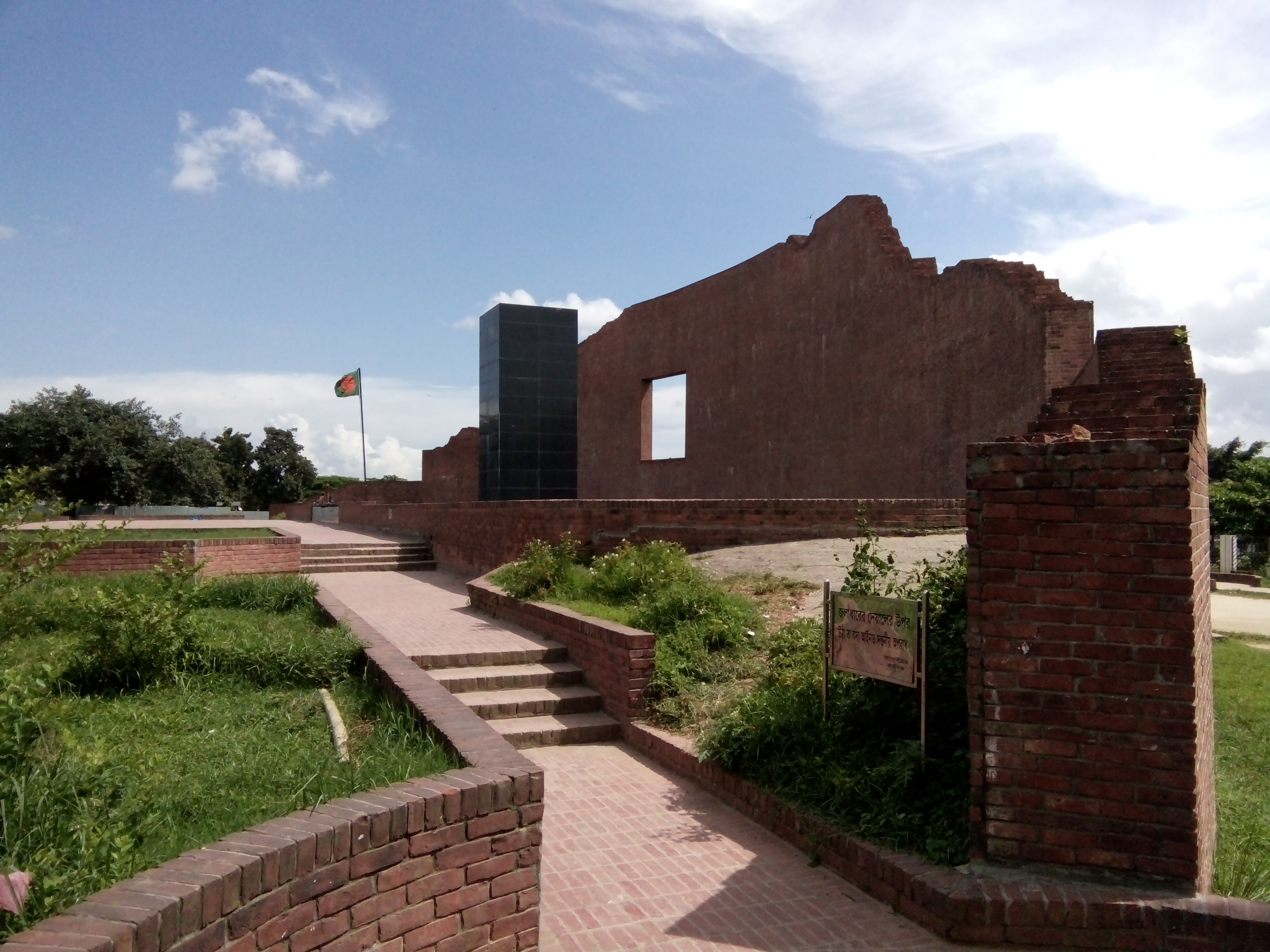
Part of the east-south side of the Martyred Intellectuals Memorial

Martyred Intellectuals Day is held annually to commemorate the victims. In Dhaka, hundreds of thousands of people walk to Mirpur to lay flowers at the Martyred Intellectuals Memorial. The president and the prime minister of Bangladesh and heads of all three wings of the Bangladesh armed forces pay homage at the memorial.

== See also ==
- Bangla College killing field
- Satanikhil massacre
- Sutrapur massacre
- 1971 Dhaka University massacre
- Katyn massacre
- Deportation of Armenian intellectuals on 24 April 1915
