= Wasim Alimuz Zaman =

Wasim Alimuz Zaman, also known as Wasim Zaman, was a Bangladeshi civil servant, population scientist and United National official who was killed in a Taliban attack in Afghanistan.

== Early life ==
Zaman was born in 1948 in Gopalganj District, East Bengal, Pakistan, to Wahiduzzaman, a politician. He completed his PhD in population sciences at Harvard University.

== Career ==
Zaman joined the Pakistan Civil Service in 1970.

Zaman joined the United Nations Population Fund in 1988. From 1995 to 1998, he was the United Nations Population Fund envoy to Bhutan and India. From 1996 to 1998, he was part of the United Nations theme group for HIV and AIDS in India and again from 2000 to 2003. He was part of the United Nations Population Fund Country Technical Services Team for South and West Asia in Kathmandu from 1998 to 2008.

In 2008, Zaman was made the special envoy of the United Nations Population Fund to Palestine.

Zaman was a member of the editorial board of the Asia Pacific Population Journal.

=== Bibliography ===
- Land Policies in Developing Countries: Select Bibliography on Agrarian Reform (1977-1983) (co-author Sein Lin, 1983)
- Public Participation in Development and Health Programs: Lessons from Rural Bangladesh (1984)
- Inter-linkages between population dynamics and development in national planning case studies from Bangladesh, India, and Malaysia
- Improving Access of Young People to Education and Services for Sexual and Reproductive Health, HIV, and Gender: Promising Practices in Indonesia, Thailand, and Vietnam (2009)

== Personal life ==
Zaman's wife lived in Malaysia while their three daughters live in the United States.

== Death ==
Zaman died in an attack by the Taliban on Serena Hotel near Arg, Kabul on 20 March 2014. He was living in Malaysia where he was the executive director of the International Council on Management of Population Programmes and had arrived in Kabul the day before the attack for a work trip.
