= Moazzem Hossain (disambiguation) =

Moazzam Hossain (Bengali: মোয়াজ্জম হোসেন) is a Bengali masculine given name of Arabic origin and may refer to:

- Sayed Moazzem Hossain (1901–1991), Islamic scholar and academic
- Mohammad Moazzem Hossain (1932–1971), educationist
- Moazzem Hossain Firozpuri (1933–1971), navy lieutenant commander
- Shah Moazzem Hossain (1939–2022), Deputy Prime Minister of Bangladesh
- Syed Moazzem Hossain Alal (born 1955), politician and lawyer
- Moazzem Hossain Ratan (born 1972), politician
- Syed Moazzam Hossain, West Bengali politician
- Moazzem Hossain Patuakhali, politician and freedom fighter
- M. Moazzam Husain, High Court justice

== See also ==
- Moazzam
- Husayn (name)
