= Martyred Intellectuals Memorial =

- শহীদ বুদ্ধিজীবী স্মৃতিসৌধ
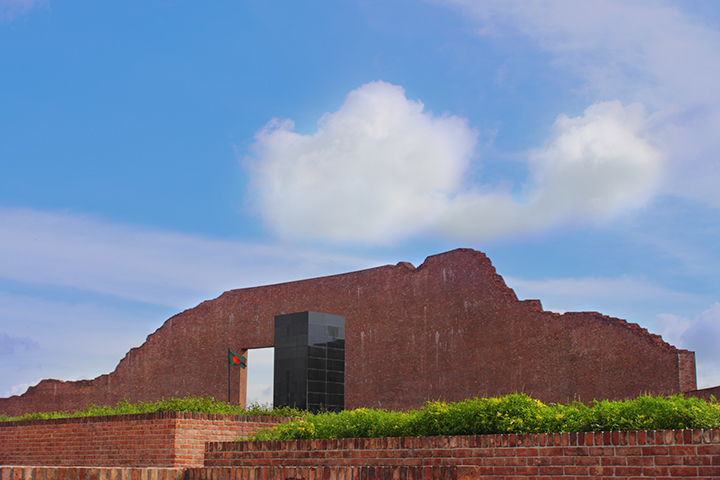
- Martyred Intellectuals Memorial
- Interactive map of the Martyred Intellectuals Memorial area

General information
- Status: Completed
- Type: Public Monument
- Location: Dhaka, Bangladesh, Rayerbazar, Mohammadpur Thana
- Construction started: 1996
- Completed: 1999

Height
- Roof: 58 feet (18 m)

Design and construction
- Architects: Farid Uddin Ahmed; Md Jami-al-Shafi

Martyred Intellectuals Memorial (Bengali: শহীদ বুদ্ধিজীবী স্মৃতিসৌধ) is a monument built in memory of the martyred intellectuals of the Bangladesh Liberation War. The memorial is located at Rayerbazar, Mohammadpur Thana in Dhaka. The memorial was designed by architect Farid U Ahmed and Jami Al Shafi. The initial proposal for a memorial at Rayer Bazar was brought forward by Projonmo 71 (organisation of the children of the martyrs of liberation war), who also laid a temporary foundation stone in 1991.

== History of intellectual massacre ==
During the entire duration of the Bangladesh Liberation War of 1971, a large number of teachers, doctors, engineers, poets and writers were systematically massacred by the Pakistan Army and their local collaborators, most notably the alleged Islamist militia groups Al-Badr and Al-Shams. The largest number of assassinations took place on 14 December 1971, only two days before the surrender of the Pakistan Army to the joint forces of the Indian Army and Mukti bahini.

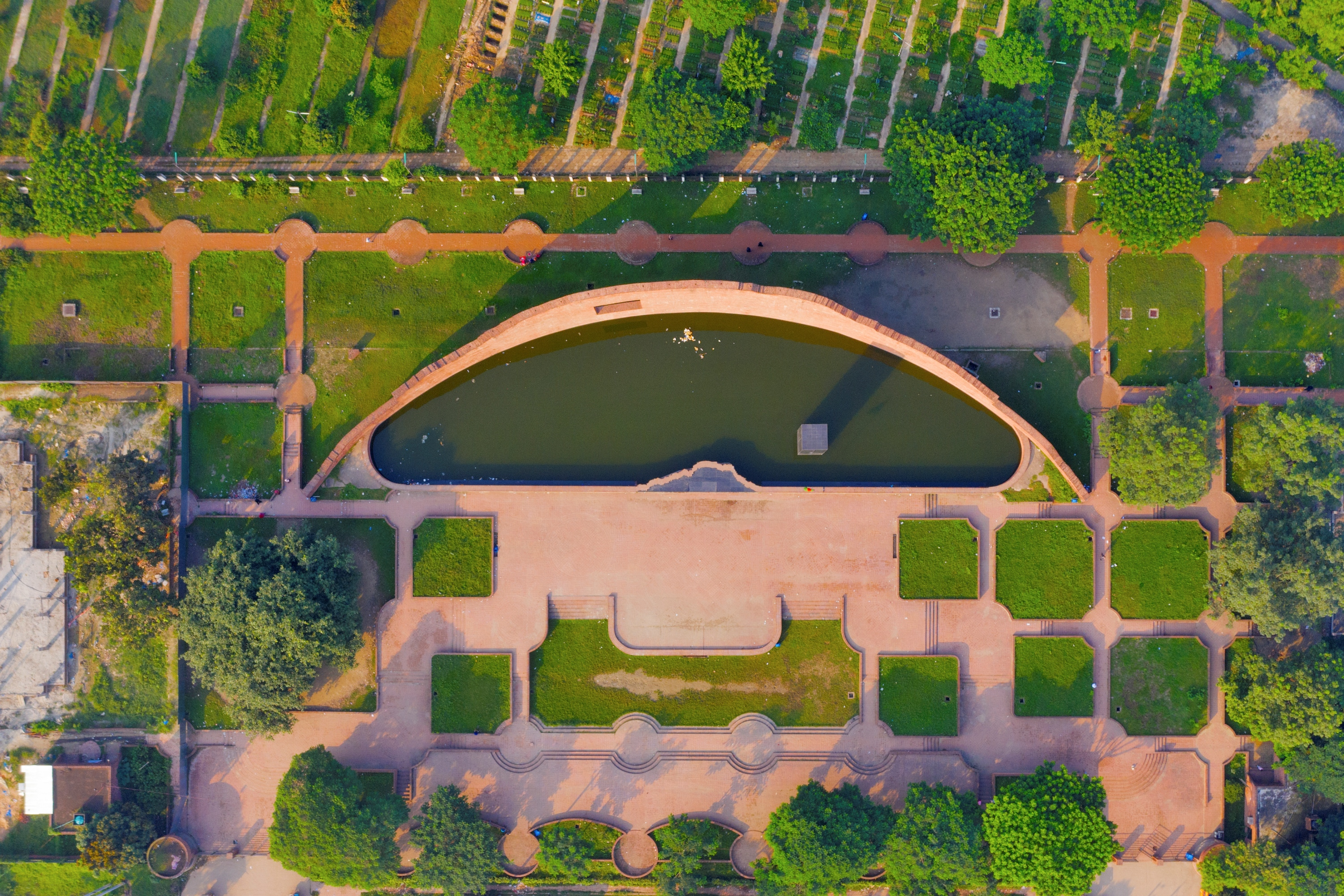
Birds-eye view of the memorial

On the night of 14 December 1971, over 200 of East Pakistan's intellectuals including professors, journalists, doctors, artists, engineers, and writers were rounded up in Dhaka. They were taken blindfolded to torture cells in Mirpur, Mohammadpur, Nakhalpara, Rajarbagh and other locations in different sections of the city. They were later executed en masse, most notably at Rayerbazar and Mirpur. In memory of the martyred intellectuals, 14 December is mourned in Bangladesh as Shaheed Buddhijibi Dibosh.

Even after the official ending of the war on 16 December, there were reports of hostile fire from the armed Pakistani soldiers and their collaborators. In one such incident, filmmaker Zahir Raihan was killed on 30 January 1972 in Mirpur, allegedly by the armed Beharis of Mirpur.

991 teachers and professors, 49 doctors, 42 lawyers, 13 journalists, and 16 others (artists, engineers, and non-journalistic writers) are estimated to have been killed.

Intellectuals who were killed between 25 March and 16 December 1971 in different parts of the country included Govinda Chandra Dev (philosopher, Professor at DU), Munier Chowdhury (litterateur, dramatist, Professor at DU), Mufazzal Haider Chaudhury (litterateur, Professor at DU), Anwar Pasha (litterateur, Professor at DU), Mohammed Fazle Rabbee (cardiologist), Alim Chowdhury (ophthalmologist), Shahidullah Kaisar (journalist), Nizamuddin Ahmed (reporter), Selina Parvin (reporter), Altaf Mahmud (lyricist and musician), Hobibur Rahman (Professor of Mathematics, RU), Sukharanjan Samaddar (Professor of Sanskrit, RU), Mir Abdul Quaiyum (Professor of Psychology, RU), Dhirendranath Datta (politician), Ranadaprasad Saha (philanthropist), Lt. Col. Moazzem Hossain (ex-soldier), Mamun Mahmood (police officer), and many others.

== Design and construction of the memorial ==
In 1993, the Government of Bangladesh decided to erect a memorial at the site. The Ministry of Housing and Works Department and the Institute of Architects Bangladesh jointly organised a national-level architectural competition for the design of the memorial "Badhya Bhumi Smriti Soudha". Out of 22 entries, the jurors selected the design proposal of architect Farid Uddin Ahmed and architect Md Jami-al-Shafi.

The Public Works Department was responsible for the implementation of the project. Its completion took about three years (1996 to 1999).

== Design significance ==
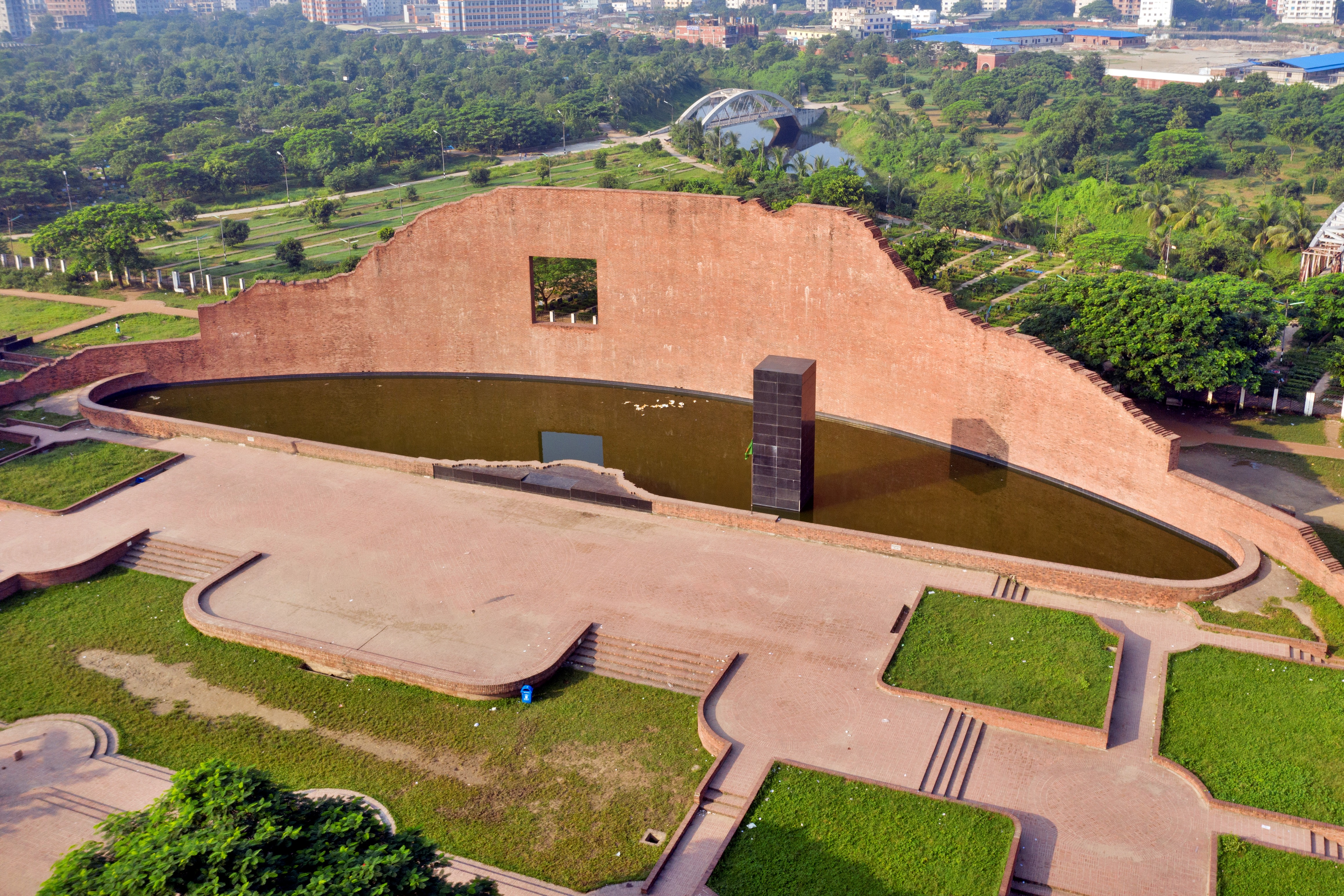
Rayerbazar Martyred Intellectuals Memorial

The main element of the monument is approximately 17.7 m high, 0.9 m thick and 115.8 m long curved brick wall, representing the original brickfield of Rayer Bazar where the dead bodies were found. The wall is broken at the two ends, representing grief and sorrow. A square window at the south-west side of the wall permits visitor's view to reach the sky behind, that also scale down the wall. In front of the curved wall is a still water body from which rises a black granite column, which represents grief.
