= Sylhet Government Alia Madrasah =

Location
- Chawhatta; Sylhet, 3100; Bangladesh; 24.8998159°N 91.8682685°E

Information
- Motto: Read by the name of your God
- Established: 1913
- Founder: Syed Abdul Majid
- Principal: Professor Muhammad Mahmudul Hasan
- Enrollment: 650+
- Language: Bengali and Arabic
- Area: 9 acres (3.6 ha)
- Campus type: Urban
- Website: sylgovaliamadrasa.edu.bd

Sylhet Government Alia Madrasa (Bengali: সিলেট সরকারী আলিয়া মাদ্রাসা; Arabic: المدرسة العالية الحكومية سلهت) is located in Chawhatta, Sylhet, Bangladesh. Founded in 1913, the madrasa currently has more than 650 students and 18 staff. The institution is located on the opposite side of Sylhet Government Women's College. It consists of 3 buildings, a dorm, a playground and 11,000-book-filled library.

== History ==
Prior to its establishment, there was a small, old, private Madrassah of the Anjuman-e-Islamia which existed in Naiyorpul. In 1913, a member of the Anjuman-e-Islamia, Syed Abdul Majid, established the Sylhet Government Alia Madrasah at the site of the old madrasa; as part of his role as the Education Minister of Assam. He gave a speech and addressed the Muslim Fisherman's Society in Kanishail to start raising funds for a high-level madrasa project in Sylhet town. In response, wealthy Mahimal businessman managed to raise the money and hand it to him. With that money, several acres of land suitable for the construction of madrasa houses, including the present government Alia Madrasa ground, located southeast of the Dargah, were purchased and the necessary construction work was also completed. Abdul Majid was questioned by some people for the reason that he approached the Mahimal community (which is generally seen as a neglected lower-class Muslim social group). He responded by saying that he did to show that this community can do big things and that they should not be neglected.

In 1933, the madrasa became one of Dacca Secondary Education Board's New Scheme High Madrasas. Two years later, Abu Nasr Wahid helped the madrasa achieve Kamil status, making it first in the country to do so.

== Notable teachers ==
Some of the notable teacher of the madrasa:

- Muhammad Abdullah
- Ismail Alam
- Mushahid Ahmad Bayampuri
- Muhammad Sahool Bhagalpuri
- Oliur Rahman

== Notable alumni ==
Some of the notable alumni of the madrasa:

- Ahmed Ali Badarpuri, Indian Islamic scholar and freedom fighter
- Abdul Jalil Choudhury, Islamic scholar and politician
- Farid Uddin Chowdhury, imam, businessman and politician
- Dewan Taimur Raja Chowdhury, politician
- Humayun Rashid Choudhury, former Speaker of the Bangladesh National Parliament
- Tajul Islam
