= Al-Mu'azzam =

Al-Mu'azzam or al-Muʿaẓẓam (المعظم, al-Muʿaẓẓam, 'exalted') may refer to:

- Al-Mu'azzam Isa, emir of Damascus as al-Mu'azzam I (1218–1227)
- Al-Muazzam Turanshah, emir of Damascus as al-Mu'azzam II (1249–1250) and sultan of Egypt (1249–1250)

== See also ==
- Moazzam (Mu'azzam)
