= Meher Ali =

Bangladeshi Politician, Liberation War Organiser and Cultural Organiser

- Born: 1 January 1941; Netrokona, Bengal, British India
- Died: 17 May 1971 (aged 30); Madhyanagar, Chittagong, Bangladesh
- Education: University of Dhaka
- Occupations: Soil scientist, businessman, politician
- Known for: Martyred Intellectual
- Political party: Bangladesh Awami League

Meher Ali (1 January 1941 – 17 May 1971) was a politician and community leader from Netrokona, East Pakistan, known for his local leadership during the Bengali nationalist movements in East Pakistan and his assassination at the onset of the Bangladesh Liberation War.

== Early life ==
Meher Ali was born on 1 January 1941 at Netrakona Sadar Upazila in Netrokona District of the then British India (now Bangladesh) to Md. Akter Ali and Musammat Tulajan Bibi.

Ali went to Anjuman Adarsha Government High School, Datta High School, and Netrakona Government College for secondary and higher secondary education, respectively. He received a Bachelor of Science (soil science) degree from the University of Dhaka.

== Political career ==
Meher Ali was the founding president of the Netrokona branches of the East Pakistan Student League and East Pakistan Labour League. Netrakona Branch. He was also elected the labour secretary of the East Pakistan Awami League, Netrakona Branch, a position he held until his death in 1971. Meher Ali led the building of the first Shaheed Minar in the Netrokona area, a monument to the martyrs of the Bengali language movement of 1952. He also founded two youth organizations—Kochikachar Mela and Jubojagoron Samiti, which played vital roles in the organization of protests in Netrokona during the 1969 East Pakistan mass uprising.

== Bangladesh Liberation War and assassination ==
At the onset of the Bangladesh Liberation War in 1971, Meher Ali helped organize a local resistance group (Muktisangram Parishad). The group set up a temporary camp at Meher Ali's father-in-law's residence at Dugnai Village, Moddhonogor Thana, which was used by Mukti Bahini for recruitment and shelter. On 17 April 1971, Meher Ali was abducted from the camp and was later executed in Maheshkhola by the collaborators of the Pakistan army.

== Legacy ==
The government of Bangladesh named "Muktijuddah Meher Ali Road" in Netrakona Sadar Upojilla in commemoration of his contribution to the Bangali nationalist movement in Pakistan and his sacrifice in the liberation war.
