= Anjuman Ara Begum =

Bangladeshi vocalist (1942–2004)

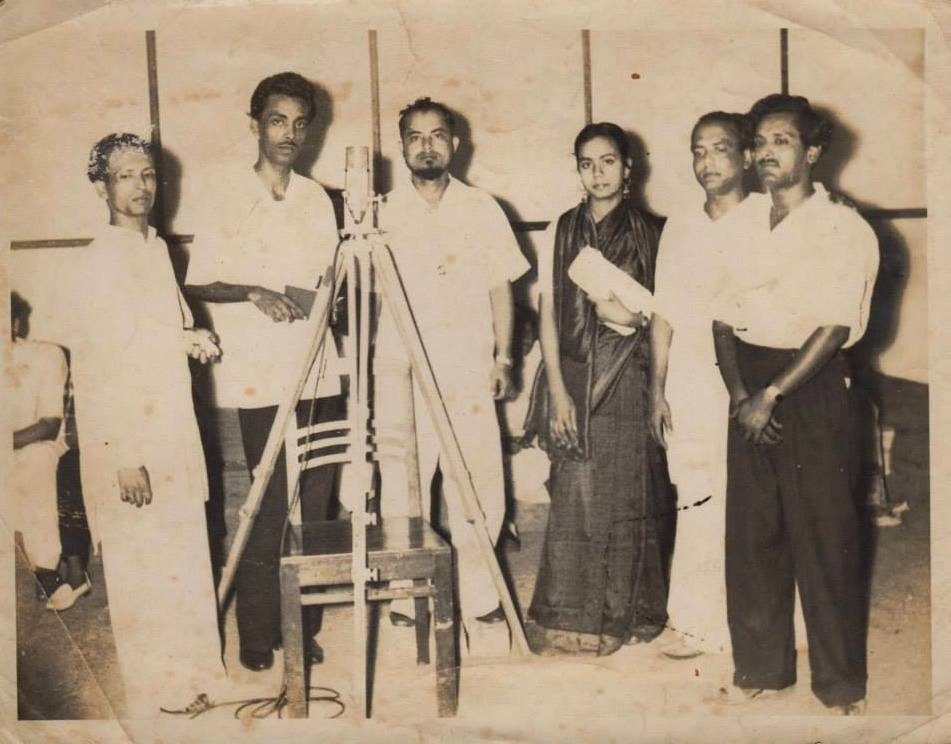
- Born: 11 January 1942; Bogra, Bengal, British India
- Died: 29 May 2004 (aged 62); Dhaka, Bangladesh
- Resting place: Banani Graveyard
- Education: University of Dhaka
- Occupation: Vocalist

Anjuman Ara Begum (11 January 1942 – 29 May 2004) was a Bangladeshi vocalist. She was awarded Ekushey Padak in 2003 by the government of Bangladesh.

== Background and career ==
Begum was born on January 11, 1942, in Bogra to Kosiruddin Talukder and Begum Ziaunnahar Talukder. She was the youngest of her two brothers and five sisters. After completing a BA (hons) and MA in sociology at the University of Dhaka, Begum started her career in playback music in 1958. Her performances spanned film, television and stage. Her notable songs include Tumi Ashbe Boley, Akasher Hatey, Key Swaraner Prantore, Khokonshona, Chadni, Brishti Johon and Shathi Ronger.

Begum rendered one of the first songs telecast on Bangladesh Television in 1964.

== Personal life ==
Begum was married to Masud Alam Siddiqui. Together they had one son Tariq Masrur, and one daughter, Umana Anjalin. Her eldest sisters were Begum Zabunnesa Jamal, a lyricist and educationist and Mahbub Ara, a singer of radio and television. Her niece, Zeenat Rahana, is a vocal artiste and Runa Laila was her cousin sister.

== Film songs ==
Year	Film	Song	Composer(s)	Songwriter(s)	Co-artist(s)
1962	Chanda (Urdu)	"Chandni Yeh Bheegi Bheegi Hawa"	Robin Ghosh	Suroor Barabankvi	solo
1964	Sutorang	"Tumi Asbe Bole"	Satya Saha	Gazi Mazharul Anwar	solo
1966	Bhawal Sanyasi	"Sokhi Amar Elo Mrigayay"	Satya Saha	Zia Haider	Shahnaz Rahmatullah
1967	Chaowa Paowa	"Ei Logoner Poth Cheye Ami Bosechhilam"	Satya Saha	Mohammad Moniruzzaman	solo
1967	Chaowa Paowa	"Ei Raat Jabe Je Chole"	Satya Saha	Mohammad Moniruzzaman	solo
1968	Momer Alo	"Ek je Chhilo Putul Raja"	Satya Saha	Gazi Mazharul Anwar	solo
1968	Rupbaner Rupkotha	"Ektu Roser Kotha Koimu"	Satya Saha	Gazi Mazharul Anwar	Nazmul Huda and chorus
1970	Chhoddobeshi	"Tumo Sokhi Sundori"	Satya Saha	Syed Shamsul Haque	Sabina Yasmin
1970	Pita Putro	"Naamer Borai Koro Nako"	Satya Saha	Gazi Mazharul Anwar	solo
1970	Rong Bodlay	"Maula Tumi, Rahim Tumi"	Satya Saha	Gazi Mazharul Anwar	solo
1971	Smritituku Thak	"Ek Je Chhilo Rajar Kumar"	Alam Khan	Gazi Mazharul Anwar	solo
1972	Anowara	"Sokhi Bol Na More"	Khandaker Nurul Alam	Abdul Latif	solo
1973	Atithi	"Ei Kothao Andhar"	Satya Saha	Gazi Mazharul Anwar	solo
1974	Dui Porbo	"Iskaponer Tekka Re"	Anwar Parvez	Gazi Mazharul Anwar	solo
1977	Pinjor	"Rani O Rani, Bhalobashar Engine"	Khandaker Nurul Alam	Shahjahan Chowdhury	Khurshid Alam
1977	Trishna	"Ghum Neme Aayre"	Satya Saha	Gazi Mazharul Anwar	Abdul Jabbar
1977	Trishna	"E Pora Chokhe Aar Nach Dekhbo Na"	Satya Saha	Gazi Mazharul Anwar	Satya Saha
1978	Maa	"Cheona Cheona"	Satya Saha	Zia Haider	Sabina Yasmin
1978	Modhumita	"Buke Chakku Maira"	Satya Saha	Gazi Mazharul Anwar, M. N. Akhtar	Tele Samad
1979	Aayna	"Lojjaboti Mukh Kholo"	Azad Rahman	Ahmed Zaman Chowdhury	Rafiqul Alam
1979	Shahzada	"Mor Ghungur Baaje Nacher Taale"	Mansur Ahmed ami	Delwar Jahan Jhontu	solo
1981	Nagin	"Jibon Tomar Haate Maula"	Deboo Bhattacharya	Mohammad Moniruzzaman	Runa Laila
1981	Swami	"Tomake Chhara Ami Bachbo Na"	Satya Saha	Gazi Mazharul Anwar	solo
1985	Shubho Ratri	"Buro Khoka Ghum Jabe, Ghum Pori Aay"	Satya Saha	Gazi Mazharul Anwar	solo

== Awards ==
- Ekushey Padak (2003)
- Tarokalok Award
- Gunijan Award from Bangladesh Shilpakala Academy
- Koloddhani Padak
