= Maulana Azad College =

Government College in Kolkata, West Bengal, India

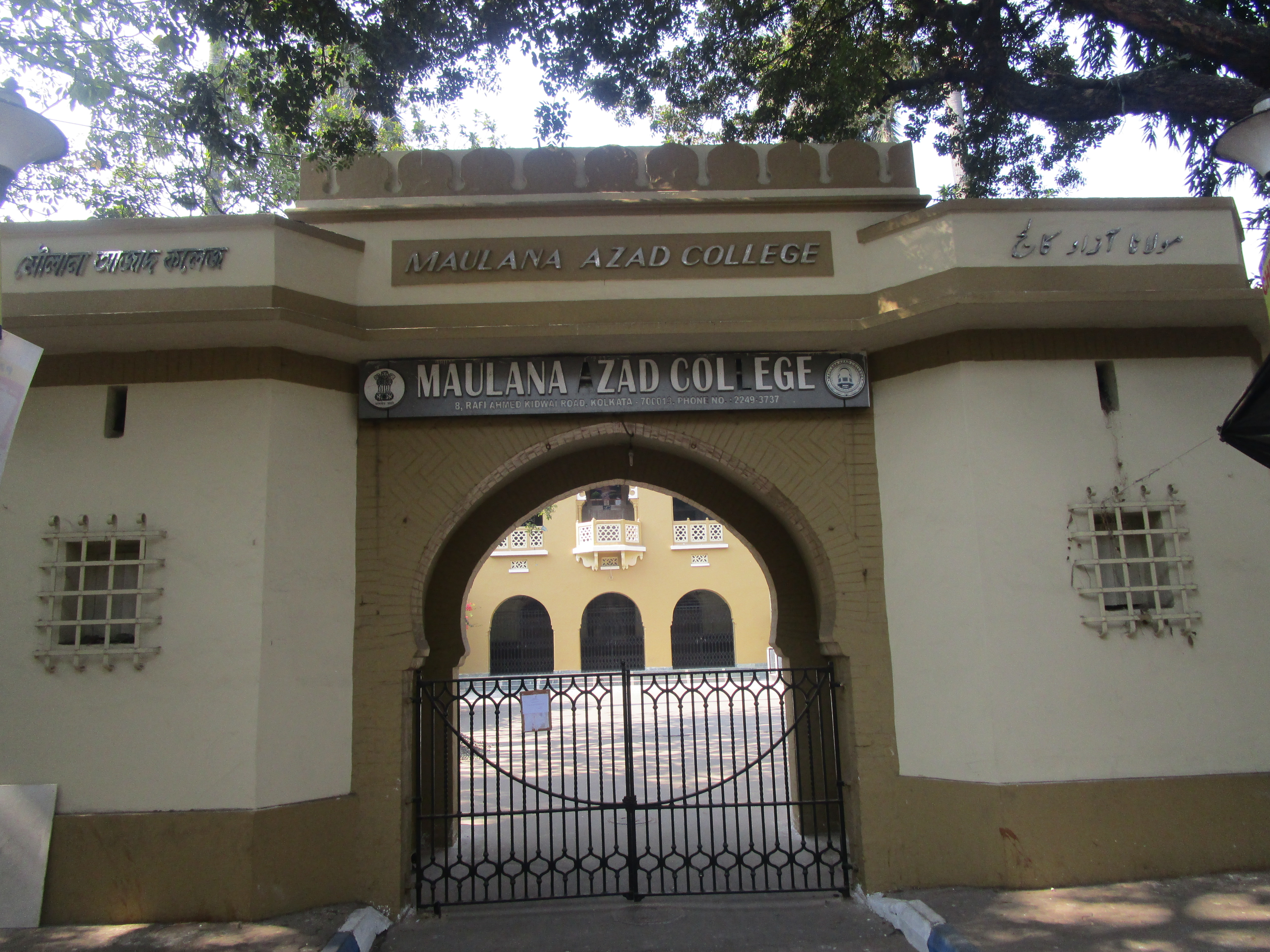
- Former names: Islamia College (1926–1947); Central Calcutta College (1947–1960)
- Type: Liberal Arts College
- Established: December 9, 1926; 99 years ago
- Founder: Victor Bulwer-Lytton, 2nd Earl of Lytton
- Accreditation: NAAC
- Academic affiliations: University of Calcutta
- Principal: Dr. Krishnendu Dutta
- Location: 8, Rafi Ahmed Kidwai Road, Kolkata, West Bengal, India; 22.5607°N 88.3574°E
- Campus: Urban
- Colours: White and olive green
- Website: maulanaazadcollegekolkata.ac.in

- Location in Kolkata Location in West Bengal Location in India

Maulana Azad College is a state government college of liberal arts (humanities, social sciences, and natural sciences) and commerce, located in central Kolkata, West Bengal, India.

The college is fully government-administered. It is located near the junction of Rafi Ahmed Kidwai Road and S.N. Banerjee Road, popularly called the 'Lotus Crossing'. It is affiliated to the University of Calcutta. The college is unique in offering numerous courses in languages associated with Islamic culture, such as Urdu, Arabic, and Persian. The college offers three post-graduate (English, Zoology, and Urdu) and 21 under-graduate courses in a number of subjects in the three streams of arts, science, and commerce. It is accredited an 'A+' grade by the National Assessment and Accreditation Council (NAAC) in the year 2025. The college has been given the status of 'College with Potential for Excellence (CPE)' by the University Grants Commission (UGC).

== History ==
Maulana Azad College was founded on 9 December 1926 by Victor Bulwer-Lytton, 2nd Earl of Lytton, then Governor of Bengal. It was originally called Islamia College. The institution was the culmination of efforts of notable Muslim leaders like A. K. Fazlul Huq, then minister of education of Bengal, Syed Nawab Ali Chowdhury and Sir Abdul Rahim. It was founded with an objective to promote Islamic learning and general education among the Muslim population in British India. The first Principal was A. H. Harley, formerly faculty of Oriental Languages at the University of Edinburgh.

In the 1940, the future founding father of Bangladesh, Sheikh Mujibur Rahman, studied at the college and stayed at the Baker Hostel.

After the Independence of India, the college was renamed to Central Calcutta College and opened admissions to students of all faith. Professor F. J. F. Pereira was made principal of the newly renamed college.

In 1960, the college received its current name Maulana Azad College in the memory of the Maulana Abul Kalam Azad. In 1990, the college became a co-educational institution. In 1999, Prime Minister Sheikh Hasina of Bangladesh visited the college and the Bangabandhu Memorial Museum at Baker Hostel.

On 23 February 2011, the governments of Bangladesh and India installed a bust of Sheikh Mujibur Rahman at the Bangabandhu Memorial Museum at room 23 and 24. The All Bengal Minority Youth Federation demanded the removal of the bust as they deemed it offensive to Islamic sensibilities. The demands were rejected by Mamata Banerjee, chief minister of West Bengal.

== Courses ==
The college offers undergraduate and postgraduate courses in arts, commerce and science in various streams. These are: B.A, B.A (Hons), B.Com. (Hons), B.Sc. (Hons) at UG level. And M.A and M.Sc. at the PG level. The fees are also nominal lying around ₹1,500/year for UG courses and around ₹4,000/year for PG courses.

== Admission procedure and cutoffs ==
The college has an online application process for all its courses. Admission into undergraduate courses are merit-based. While that of postgraduate courses is done by both merit as well as an admission test. The 12th Class Finals cutoff percentage lies around ~90%.

== Rankings ==
IndiaToday Rank in Kolkata
Ranking	Science/B.Sc.	Commerce/B.Com.
2015	1st	5th

== Notable alumni ==
- Tarapada Roy, Writer
- Sheikh Mujibur Rahman, Founding father of Bangladesh, its first President and later prime minister.
- Abdullah al Mahmood, lawyer and politician
- A. T. M. Mustafa, federal minister of Pakistan.
- Muhammad Mansur Ali, one of the Founding leader of Bangladesh and it's the 1st finance minister and also served as the prime minister of Bangladesh in 1975.
- Biman Bose, communist politician, Politburo Member and senior CPI(M) leader.
- Dewan Mahbub Ali, politician and member of East Pakistan Provincial Assembly.
- Habibullah Bahar Chowdhury, Health Minister of East Pakistan.
- Illias Uddin Ahmed, sportsperson.
- Kazi Golam Mahbub, politician.
- Khaleque Nawaz Khan language movement activist who defeated incumbent Prime Minister of the then East Bengal in 1954 Jukto Front election.
- K G Mustafa, journalist.
- Khuda Buksh, an insurance executive.
- M Osman Ali, one of the founders of Awami League.
- Mashiur Rahman, ex-minister, member of the parliament, and the highest ranking Awami League leader assassinated by the Pakistani army during the 1971 liberation movement of Bangladesh.
- Mohammed Salim, Ex Lok Sabha MP from Raiganj (Lok Sabha constituency), Politburo Member and senior CPI(M) leader.
- Muhammad Habibar Rahman, chairman of the department of mathematics at the University of Rajshahi and killed in 1971 by Pakistan Army.
- Muhammad Shamsul Huq, Vice-Chancellor of the University of Dhaka and Foreign Minister of Bangladesh.
- Nafis Ahmad, geographer.
- Serajuddin Hossain, prominent Bangladeshi journalist and was the news and executive editor of The Daily Ittefaq.
- Sultan Ahmed, Indian politician and the Union Minister of State for Tourism in the Manmohan Singh government.
- Syed Altaf Hossain, Minister of Railways of Bangladesh.
- Syed Azizul Huq, member of parliament of Bangladesh.
- Tofail Ahmed, researcher of folk arts.
- Taradas Bandyopadhyay, prominent Bengali author, son of the legendary author Bibhutibhushan Bandyopadhyay.
- Wahiduzzaman, politician and minister of commerce of Pakistan.
- Zahur Ahmad Chowdhury, Minister of Health and Family Welfare in Bangladesh

== Notable faculty ==
- Bishnu Dey, prominent Bengali poet, writer, essayist, art appreciator, Jnanpith Awardee, and former professor of English Literature.
- Itrat Husain Zuberi, former professor of English Literature and former Vice-Chancellor of the University of Rajshahi.
- Parimal Bhattacharya, prominent Bengali & English author, Ananda Puraskar awardee, and former professor of English Literature.

== See also ==
- List of colleges affiliated to the University of Calcutta
- Education in India
- Education in West Bengal
