= Moazzam =

Moazzam, Muazzam, Muazzem, and Moazzem (from Arabic المعظم, muʿaẓẓam, 'exalted') is a masculine given name and surname of Arabic origin. Notable people with the name include:

== Given name ==
=== Moazzam ===
- Moazzam Jah Ansari (born 1965), officer of the Police Service of Pakistan
- Moazzam Begg (born 1968), British Pakistani held in Guantanamo Bay detainment camp
- Moazzam Ilyas (born 1965), HI(M), SI(M), two-star rank admiral in the Pakistan Navy
- Moazzam Jah, KCIE (1907–1987), the son of the last Nizam of Hyderabad
- Moazzam Ali Khan, Pakistani politician
- Moazzam Malik (cricketer) (born 1994), Pakistani cricketer
- Moazzam Malik (diplomat) CMG is a British civil servant and diplomat
- Moazzam Pahalwan or Bholu Brothers (born 1937), Pakistani wrestlers of Kashmiri origin
- Moazzam Jahanzeb Wattoo, Pakistani politician

=== Moazzem ===
- Moazzem Ahmed Chowdhury, Pakistani politician
- Moazzem Hossain (disambiguation), multiple people

=== Muazzam ===
- Muazzam Beg (born 1978), Indian Bollywood film writer and director
- Muazzam Khan (disambiguation), multiple people

=== Muazzem ===
- Muazzem Hussein Chowdhury (1903–1967), Bengali politician

== Surname ==
- Muhammad Mu'azzam (1643–1712), eighth Mughal emperor

== See also ==
- Moazzam Jahi Market, fruit market in Hyderabad, Telangana, India
- Al-Mu'azzam (disambiguation)
