= Tarapada Roy =

Indian writer

- Born: 17 November 1936; Tangail, Bengal Presidency, British India (now in Bangladesh)
- Died: 25 August 2007 (aged 70); Kolkata, West Bengal, India
- Occupation: Writer
- Writing career
- Language: Bengali

Tarapada Ray (Bengali: তারাপদ রায়) was a Bengali writer of poems, short stories, and essays. He is especially known for his satirical sense of humour. He was born on 1 November 1936 in Tangail, then Bengal Presidency. He lived in Kolkata in the Indian state of West Bengal until his death on 25 August 2007.

== Early life ==
He had his schooling in Bengal where he passed his matriculation from Bindubasini High English School. In 1951, he came to Calcutta to attend college. He studied economics in Central Calcutta College (presently Maulana Azad College). For a time he taught in a school in Habra in North 24 Parganas.

Apart from numerous short stories and essays (mostly satirical), he wrote many poems as well. His first collection of poems, "Tomar Pratima" was published in 1960. He also wrote several short shorties commemorating his childhood days spent in then East Bengal. Among his most important works are novel like Charabari Porabari and travelogue like Neel Digante Tokhon Magic. He died on 25 August 2007. He was survived by a son and his wife. He was suffering from kidney failure for the last few months. He was so enthusiastic about writing, that it was reported that he even wrote several pieces from his hospital.

Tarapada had close friendship with Hollywood actor Wallace Shawn and famous author Deborah Eisenberg.

== Selected bibliography ==
- Kandogyan
- Bidda Buddhi
- Bhadralok(gentleman)
- Mandhata
- Buddhishuddhi
- Gyan gomyi
- Dodo tatai palakahini
- Swanirbachita Tarapada Roy
- Chilam bhalobashar neel potakatole shadhin
- Charabari Porabari
- Balish

Poem Collection

- Tomar protima - 1960
- Chhiam Bhalobasar Nil Patatae Swadhin - 1967
- Kothay Jachchhen Tarapada Babu - 1970
- Neel Digante Ekhon Magic - 1974
- Pata O Pakhider Alochana - 1975
- Bhaobasar Kabita - 1977
- Daridrarekha - 1986
- Durbhikker Kabita
- Jaler Moto Kabita - 1992
- Din Ani Din Khai - 1994
- Tubeshishur Baba - 1995
- Bhalo Achho Garib Manus - 2001
- Kobi O Parashini - 2002

== Awards ==
- Shiromani award
- Katha award (1995)
