= Muhammad Abdullah (academic) =

Bangladeshi academic

Mumtaz al-Muhadditheen Dr. Muhammad Abdullah

Personal life
- Born: 1 April 1932 Lakshmipur, Bengal Province, British India
- Died: 21 October 2008 (aged 76) Dhaka, Bangladesh
- Education: University of Dhaka (BA, MA, MPhil, PhD); Haji Mohammad Mohsin College (HSC); Calcutta Alia Madrasa (Kamil); Noakhali Karamatia Madrasa (Alim, Fazil)

Religious life
- Religion: Islam
- Denomination: Sunni
- Jurisprudence: Hanafi
- Arabic name
- Personal (Ism): Muḥammad ʿAbdullāh محمد عبد الله
- Patronymic (Nasab): ibn Mukhliṣ ar-Raḥmān بن مخلص الرحمن
- Toponymic (Nisba): an-Nawākhālawī النواخالوي

Muhammad Abdullah (1 April 1932 – 21 October 2008) was a Bangladeshi Islamic scholar and academic. He was a professor of University of Dhaka and researcher.

== Early life and education ==
Muhammad Abdullah was born on 1 April 1932 to a Bengali Muslim family in the village of Bangakhan in Lakshmipur subdivision, Noakhali District, Bengal Province, British Raj. He passed Alim and Fazil from Noakhali Karamatia Madrasa in 1943 and 1945 respectively. He was conferred "Mumtazul Muhaddisin" title from Calcutta Alia Madrasa in 1947. He passed HSC from Haji Mohammad Mohsin College in 1949. He graduated from University of Dhaka in Urdu in 1952. He received his postgraduate degree from this institution in 1953 in Urdu. He also received his postgraduate degree in Islamic Studies and Arabic from University of Dhaka in 1972 and 1973 respectively. He was conferred MPhil in 1981. He was also conferred a PhD in 1983 in Arabic from University of Dhaka.

== Career ==
Abdullah joined Sylhet Government Alia Madrasah in 1952. He joined University of Dhaka in 1972 as an assistant professor in the Urdu and Arabic departments. He became an associate professor in 1978 and a professor in 1985. He retired from his job in 1992. After retirement he worked as a supernumerary professor for ten years.

Abdullah was fluent in Arabic, Persian, Bangla, Urdu and English. He wrote 33 books. His articles were published in Bangladesh the Encyclopedia, Islamic Encyclopedia, and journals from home and abroad. He also conducted eleven research projects for the University Grant Commission.

== Awards and recognition ==
The editorial board of a magazine of Lahore titled Saiyara conferred on him "Nishan-e-Urdu" in 1966 for his contribution to Urdu language and literature. He was also awarded Ibrahim Khan Gold Medal in 1992 from University of Dhaka.

== Death ==
Abdullah died on 21 October 2008 at the age of 76 in Shaheed Suhrawardy Hospital, Dhaka.
