= A. B. M. Abdur Rahim =

Bangladeshi intellectual

- Born: 2 January 1936; Brahmanbaria, Bengal, British India
- Disappeared: May 5, 1971 (aged 35); Dacca, Bangladesh
- Status: Missing for 55 years, 6 months and 17 days
- Occupations: Union consultant of Pakistan Labour Federation and manager of Ujala Match Factory
- Known for: Martyred Intellectual
- Spouse: Jharna Rahim
- Children: ABM Sohel Rashid
- Parent(s): Abdur Rashid (Khurshed Mullah), Musammad Fatima Begum

A. B. M. Abdur Rahim (1936 – disappeared 1971) was a Bangladeshi intellectual who organised resistance during the Bangladesh Liberation War and who disappeared after being arrested by armed forces.

== Early life and career ==
Abdur Rahim was born on 2 January 1936, in the village of Ghatiyara in the Basudeb Union of Brahmanbaria District in the then British India, now under the Chittagong Division of Bangladesh.

Rahim was the then Labour Legal Consultant and served as the General Secretary of the Pakistan Labour Federation. He also was a manager at the Ujala Match Factory. He was also the joint secretary of the National Federation of Pakistan Posts and Telegraphs Employees.

During the 1971 Bangladesh war, Rahim engaged in building pro-independence movement among workers in Dhaka that included sending them secretly to India for training.

== Disappearance ==
Abdur Rahim was abducted by Pakistani troops on 5 May 1971 from his workplace (Ujala Match Factory) while preparing to travel to India for a training. He has been missing since then.

== Awards and honours ==
In January 1996, the Bangladesh Postal Department released a postage stamp in honor of Rahim.

On 25 February and March 2021, Ministry of Liberation War Affairs and the Government of Bangladesh published the names of 209 intellectuals.

== See also ==
- List of kidnappings
- List of people who disappeared
