= Oliur Rahman (homeopath) =

Pakistani homeopath and islamic scholar

Mawlana Oliur Rahman Khorasani

President of the Awami Ulama Party
- In office 1966–1969
- Preceded by: Position established
- Succeeded by: Abdur Rashid Tarkabagish
- Title: Intellectual

Personal life
- Born: Shah Oliur Rahman; 7 February 1932 Sylhet District, Assam Province, British India
- Died: 14 December 1971 (aged 39) Rayerbazar, East Pakistan, Pakistan
- Cause of death: Assassination
- Era: 20th century
- Political party: Awami League
- Main interest(s): Tafsir, Hadith, Fiqh, Politics
- Notable idea: Ministry of Religious Affairs
- Occupation: Homeopath

Religious life
- Religion: Islam
- Denomination: Sunni
- Lineage: Shah Kamal Quhafah
- Jurisprudence: Quran, Hadith
- Movement: Bangladesh independence movement
- Profession: Translator

Muslim leader
- Influenced by: Shah Habibur Rahman
- Influenced: Sheikh Mujibur Rahman
- Awards: Islamic Foundation Award (2001)

Oliur Rahman was a East Pakistani homeopath, translator, and islamic exegete. The founding president of the Awami Ulama Party, he was killed by members of the Al-Badr militia during the 1971 killing of Bengali intellectuals.

== Early life ==
Oliur Rahman was born on 7 February 1932 in Maiarchar, Sylhet District, Assam Province, British India (located in present-day Tukerbazar Union, Bangladesh). Shah Habibur Rahman Khorasani, father of thirteen children including Oliur, was a descendant of Sufi saint Shah Kamal Quhafah, a companion of Shah Jalal. Oliur's ancestors had originally migrated from Khorasan. His younger brother, Safiur Rahman Khorasani, was an instructor at the Public Administration Institute before the independence of Bangladesh and later became a professor. After passing the Alim examination in 1949 and the higher secondary examination in 1950, Oliur passed the Fazil examination in 1951. In 1953, he passed the Dawra-e-Hadith examination.

== Career ==
In the same year he passed the Dawra-e-Hadith examination, Oliur began his career as the superintendent of Ahmadia Madrasah in Barisal. From the following year, he taught for five years at the Sylhet Alia Madrasah. In 1960, he relocated to Dhaka. During the 1960s, he worked at the Bangla Academy as an Urdu and Arabic translator and researcher. Alongside this, he continued working as a commentator of the Quran. In 1965, after receiving education in homeopathic medicine in Karachi, West Pakistan, he returned to East Pakistan and established his own homeopathic clinic in Jinjira near Dhaka, where he began providing homeopathic services.

== Activism ==
In 1952, he was active in the Bengali language movement from Sylhet. In the 1960s, he joined a religious organization called Uttehadul Ulama, which at that time was affiliated with the Jamaat-e-Islami Pakistan. He became the vice-president of the East Pakistan branch and the president of its Dhaka branch of the Uttehadul Ulama. However, after conflicts arose with Jamaat-e-Islami, he left the organization. In 1966, after Sheikh Mujibur Rahman, president of the East Pakistan Awami League, presented the Six Points in Lahore, Jamaat-e-Islami's amir Abul A'la Maududi criticized it. In response, Oliur wrote letters to him and several leaders in East Pakistan, urging them to accept the Six Points. Later, Oliur came into close contact with Mujib and became the founding president of the Awami Ulama Party, formed under Mujib's instructions to build support for the Six Points. To counter the propaganda spread by Jamaat-e-Islami to suppress the Six Points, he authored several books that helped popularize the programme. He had demanded the establishment of a separate ministry for religious affairs in Pakistan. He also took part in the 1969 East Pakistan mass uprising.

== Personal life, death and legend ==
In 1971, during the Bangladesh Liberation War in East Pakistan, Oliur took shelter in Kathuria, a village near Jinjira. But people there soon recognized him. As a result, on Friday, 11 December, he moved to a friend's house in Lalbagh. When he went to offer friday prayers at a mosque there, members of the Al-Badr located him. That night he decided to stay over at his friend's house, but the Al-Badr forces abducted him and his friend from the house. Later, Oliur's friend returned and informed the locals and the family that they had been abducted and taken to Rayerbazar, where they were confined in a cell and Oliur was tortured. He was killed on 14 December. However, Oliur's body was never found. His name appears in the list of martyred intellectuals published by the government of Bangladesh in 1972. In an urgent letter sent in 1973, Sheikh Mujibur Rahman, who was prime minister of Bangladesh that time, acknowledged Oliur's contribution to the independence movement of Bangladesh and requested minister M. A. G. Osmani to provide financial assistance to his family. Before his death, Oliur left behind a wife and two children, one of whom, Mohammad Junayed Khorasani, is a teacher at Haji Abdus Sattar High School. Educationist Abul Kashem said about Oliur:

কোনো কোনো আলেম যে জীবন ও জগৎ সম্পর্কে এতো আধুনিক জ্ঞান ও চিন্তা চেতনার অধিকারী হতে পারেন এবং এত বিশুদ্ধ ও প্রাঞ্জল বাংলা ভাষায় ঘণ্টার পর ঘণ্টা বক্তৃতা দিতে পারেন তা মাওলানা অলিউর রহমানের বক্তৃতা শোনার আগে আমি কোনোদিন কল্পনাও করতে পারিনি। একাত্তরের মুক্তিযুদ্ধে ও বঙ্গবন্ধুর স্বাধীকার আন্দোলনের এক মহান নেতা হিসেবে এই মাওলানার ঐতিহাসিক অবদান তাকে অমর করে রেখেছে দেশ ও জাতির কাছে।

"I could never imagine that certain Islamic scholars could possess such modern knowledge and intellectual depth about life and the world, and could deliver hour-long speeches in such pure and fluent Bengali, until I heard Maulana Oliur Rahman speak. His historic contribution as a great leader of the Liberation War of 1971 and Bangabandhu's autonomy movement has immortalized him in the eyes of the nation."

— Abul Kashem

In 2001, he was awarded the Islamic Foundation Award. In 2024, Ministry of Liberation War Affairs recognized him as liberation war's martyred intellectual by a government gazette.

== Works ==
Oliur's notable works:

- শরীয়তের দৃষ্টিতে ছয়দফা (lit. 'Six-Point Programme in the View of Sharia')
- ৬ দফা ইসলামের বিরোধী নহে (lit. 'The Six Points Are Not Contrary to Islam')
- যুক্তি ও কষ্টি পাথরে ছয়দফা (lit. 'Six-Point Programme Tested by Logic and Touchstone')
- জয়বাংলা ও কয়েকটি স্লোগান প্রসঙ্গে (lit. 'On Joy Bangla and a Few Slogans')
- স্বতন্ত্র ধর্ম দপ্তর: একটি জাতীয় প্রয়োজন (lit. 'Separate Ministry of Religious Affairs: A National Necessity')
