= Kosiruddin Talukder =

- কসিরউদ্দিন তালুকদার
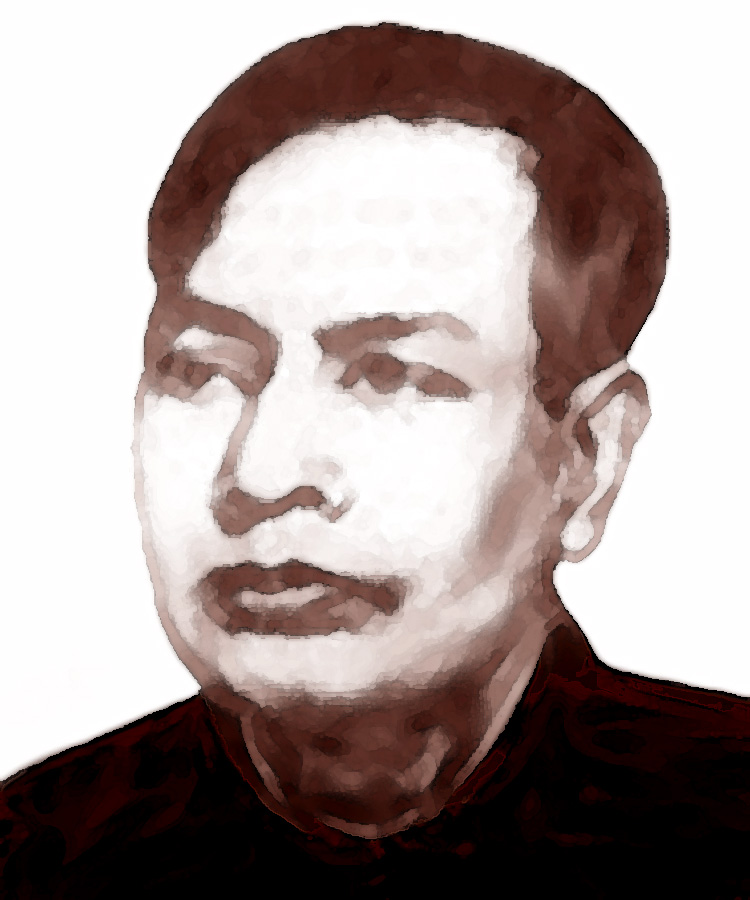
- Born: 17 July 1899; Dhupchanchia, Bengal, British India
- Died: 29 May 1971 (aged 71); Bogra Cantonment, Rajshahi, Bangladesh
- Cause of death: Execution by firing squad
- Education: MBBS
- Alma mater: Calcutta Medical College
- Known for: Martyred Intellectual
- Political party: Pakistan Muslim League
- Spouse: Zcanunhar Khafoon (m. 1923–1971)
- Children: 2 sons and 5 daughters, including Anjuman Ara Begum

Kosiruddin Talukder (1899-1971) was a Pakistani medical doctor and politician who died in the Bangladesh Liberation war and is considered as martyr intellectual of 1971.

== Early life and education ==
Talukder was born on 17 July 1899 in Mahishmunda, Dupchanchia, Bogra, Bengal Presidency, British Raj. He was born to a Zamindar family. His father was Nakibullah Talukder. He started primary education in Sonamukhi High School, completed matriculation from Bogra Zilla School and ISC from Scottish Church College, Kolkata. In 1929, he completed his MBBS from Calcutta Medical College.

== Career ==
Talukder started his medical practice in 1930 in Bogra. He ran his medical practice with a pharmacy. His pharmacy was called The United Medical Store. He provided his medical advice and medicine to the poor for free which earned him the name Hamar Gariber Doctor or Physician of the poor. He was a member of Bengal Legislative Council until 1947, president of Bogra Muslim League, Chairman of Bogra zill board, one of the founding member of Azizul Haque College, president of Bogra doctor's association.

He was active in the cultural programs in Bogra.

Talukder was involved in organizing the non-cooperation movement in March 1971 in Bogra. He led rallies in the district in support of the Independence of Bangladesh. After the start of Bangladesh Liberation war he treated members of Mukti Bahini. He and his family left Bogra town for his native Mahishmunda. There he treated injured people from Bogra town. His home and pharmacy were burned down by the Pakistan Army. He returned with his wife to Bogra town on 21 May 1971.

== Death ==
On 29 May 1971, he was taken from his home to the local police station by members of Pakistan Army. On the same day he was killed with 11 other civilian people in Majhira near Bogra Cantonment. Later native people identified his body.

The Bangladesh Post Office issued commemorative postal stamp on 14 December 1994 with his picture.
