= Sheikh Abdul Mannan =

Bangladeshi journalist

General Secretary of Mohamedan Sporting Club
- In office 1963–1965

Personal details
- Born: Kolkata, West Bengal
- Died: 1971 Dhaka, Bangladesh

Sheikh Abdul Mannan (died 1971) was a Bangladeshi journalist who died in the Bangladesh Liberation War and is considered a "martyr" in Bangladesh.

== Early life ==
Mannan was born in Kolkata, West Bengal, British Raj in the 1920s. He moved with his family to East Pakistan after the Partition of India.

== Career ==
At the beginning of his career, he worked in the Daily Azad and the Daily Sangbad. He was one of the first sports journalist writing in English in East Pakistan. He was in charge of the sports desk of Pakistan Observer for over a decade. He worked as the racing correspondent of the paper. The Pakistan Observer under his leadership took a position against the importation of football players from West Pakistan for the Dhaka Football league.

Mannan dubbed one team in Dhaka League as the "Makrani Eleven" for having an entire lineup made up of West Pakistani players, after the region in West Pakistan where most of players were from. From 1963 to 1965 he served as the General Secretary of Mohamedan Sporting Club in Dhaka. He was a member of the East Pakistan Sports federation. He championed the cause of sportsmen in East Pakistan. In 1962 he was the founding General Secretary of East Pakistan Sports Press Association (today Bangladesh Sports Press Association).

== Death and legacy ==
Mannan had kept contact with members of the Mukti Bahini and journalists who had moved to India during Bangladesh Liberation War in 1971. He was picked up from his flat in Purana Paltan by masked men and he has not been since then.
