= Muhammad Habibar Rahman =

Bengali intellectual

- মুহাম্মদ হাবিবর রহমান
- Pronunciation: Muhām'mada Hābibara Rahamāna
- Born: 1 January 1923; Noahkhali, Bengal, British India
- Disappeared: 15 April 1971 (aged 48); Rajshahi, Rajshahi, Bangladesh
- Known for: Martyred Intellectual
- Awards: Ekushey Padak

Muhammad Habibur Rahman (1 January 1923 - 15 April 1971) was a Bengali intellectual who was killed in the Bangladesh Liberation War and is considered a martyr in Bangladesh.

== Early life ==
Rahman was born in Baliadhar, Noakhali District, East Bengal, British India, on 1 January 1923. He finished his SSC from Dattapara High School in 1938 and HSC from Calcutta Islamia College in 1940. He finished his undergraduate studies in mathematics at Presidency College in Kolkata. He completed his master's degree in mathematics from Aligarh University.

== Career ==
He joined Dhaka College as a professor of mathematics in 1946. In 1951 he received government funding to study at Cambridge University in the United Kingdom. He graduated from Cambridge in 1953 after finishing the Tripos in mathematics. He worked at Presidency College in Kolkata before joining Rajshahi University in 1954. He joined as a professor of mathematics and by 1958 had been promoted to reader. In 1962 he pursued higher studies in applied mathematics in the United States. From 1964 to 1966, he served as the chairman of the Department of Mathematics at Rajshahi University. From 1967 to 1970, he served as the provost of Ameer Ali Hall of Rajshahi University, after which he returned to being the chairman of the Department of Mathematics. He was a member of the Dhaka Rationalist club.

== Death ==
The Pakistan Army on 15 April 1971 captured him from his home in front of his family, and he never came back, and is presumed to be dead. Rajshahi University named Shaheed Habibur Rahman Hall after him. The dorm has a bust of him in its entrance. He was also awarded the "Ekushey Padak", the second highest civilian award in Bangladesh.
