= Ataur Rahman Khan Khadim =

- আতাউর রহমান খান খাদিম
- Pronunciation: Ātā'ura Rahamāna Khāna Khādima
- Born: 1933; Akhaura, Bengal, British India
- Died: 25 March 1971 (aged 37–38); Shahbag, East Pakistan, Pakistan
- Other names: Atta ur Rehman Khan
- Known for: Martyred Intellectual

Atta ur Rehman Khan was an academic in the Bangladesh Liberation War and is considered a martyr in Bangladesh.

== Early life ==
Khadim was born in Kharampur, Akhaura, Brahmanbaria District, in 1933. He graduated from George H. E. School in 1948 and Dhaka College in 1950. He completed his master's degree in physics from Dhaka University in 1954.

== Career ==
After graduation, Khadim joined Philips Electric Company as an electrical engineer in 1955. From 1959 to 1960, he studied theoretical physics at the physics institute of the University of Göttingen in West Germany. After completion, he joined Dhaka University as a lecturer, where he specialized in experimental physics and electronics.

== Death and legacy ==
On 25 March 1971, Khadim was killed by the Pakistani army at the onset of Operation Searchlight and the Bangladesh Liberation War, in the teachers' quarter of Shahidullah Hall in Dhaka University.
