= Sutrapur massacre =

Massacre in South Asia on 27 March 1971

Coordinates: 23.7022°N 90.4185°E

Sutrapur massacre সূত্রাপুর গণহত্যা
- Part of Bangladesh genocide
- Location: Sutrapur, Dhaka, East Pakistan
- Date: 27 March 1971 (UTC+6:00)
- Target: Bengali Hindus
- Attack type: Massacre
- Weapon: Rifles
- Deaths: 15
- Perpetrator: Pakistani Army

The Sutrapur massacre (Bengali: সূত্রাপুর গণহত্যা) was the massacre of unarmed Bengali Hindu residents of Malakartola Lane of Sutrapur in Dhaka on 27 March 1971. The Pakistan army shot dead fourteen Bengali Hindus and one Muslim in the Loharpool bridge of Sutrapur.

== Background ==
The Sutrapur locality is part of old Dhaka. In 1971, it had a significant Hindu population, most of whom were well established. After the Partition, several non-Bengali Muslim families too began to stay in Sutrapur. In the evening of 25 March, the Pakistan army launched Operation Searchlight. They shelled different parts of the city and resorted to cold blooded killings. On the next day, the Pakistan army shelled the Sutrapur police station compound. Some of the policemen died while the rest fled. The Pakistan army converted the Sutrapur police station to an army camp.

== Killings ==
Since the army crackdown began on the evening of 25 March, curfew had been promulgated in the city. On the morning of 27 March the curfew was relaxed for a few hours. Many local residents took the opportunity to flee to the countryside across the Buriganga river. In the afternoon, eleven Bengali Hindus were rounded up from Malakartola Lane by the Pakistan Army and brought to the Biharilal Jiu's temple. Among them was Dr. Harinath Dey, research scientist and former professor of biochemistry at the University of Dhaka. In the evening they were taken to the army camp in Sutrapur police station and forced to kneel down for several hours. A few other detainees were confined in the camp in a similar manner.

At around 10 pm, a group of Pakistani soldiers descended from the upstairs and marched the detainees to the Loharpool bridge. The detainees were made to stand in a line at the end of the bridge and burst fired. The bullet ridden bodies fell on the Dholai canal. Harinath Dey was killed on the spot. Paresh Chandra Das, an engineer with the Dhaka Electricity Development Board, miraculously survived. The Hindu residences of Malakartola were looted. The image and the marble floors of the Biharilal Jiu temple was looted.

== Memorial ==
In 2010, a mural was painted at the Malakartola crossing in memory of the victims.
