= Battle of Kushtia =

Battle fought during Bangladesh War of Independence

- Part of Bangladesh Liberation War
Date	March–April 1971
Location	Kushtia, Khulna, Bangladesh
Result	Bangladeshi victory
Territorial changes	Kushtia was captured in April; Provisional Government established base at Mujibnagar

Belligerents
Mukti Bahini	Pakistan; Pakistan Army

Commanders and leaders
Abu Osman Chowdhury	Mohammad Ayub (POW); Major Shoeb

Units involved
Sector – VIII	27th Baluch Regiment

Strength
5,000 militiamen and policemen	147 troops

Casualties and losses
50–70 killed, 500 captured or disarmed	73 killed and dozens captured

The Battle of Kushtia (Bengali: কুষ্টিয়ার যুদ্ধ) was a battle between the Bengali guerrillas including policemen against the Pakistan Army in March and April 1971, The battle was fought by the Mukti Fauj and the 27th Baluch Regiment of the Pakistan Army.

The battle started in late March after the Pakistan Army began Operation Searchlight, when Pakistanis took Kushtia, and later Bengalis started a mass campaign to capture Kushtia.

== Battle ==
13 jeeps and trucks came to a halt outside Kushtia's police station. It was 10:30 on the night, the war broke out. Delta Company of the 27th Baluch Regiment had arrived from its base at Jessore cantonment 60 miles to the south. The 147 men of the company, quickly disarmed some 500 Bengali policemen without meeting any resistance and then occupied four additional key points, the district police headquarters, the government office building, the VHP radio transmitter and the Zilla School for boys. Most of the sleeping townspeople did not realize what had happened until 5:30 a.m., when Jeeploads of soldiers with bullhorns drove through the empty streets announcing that a total curfew was to begin 30 minutes later.

Kushtia remained calm for 48 hours while the curfew was in effect, although seven persons—mostly peasants who arrived in town unaware of what had happened—were shot to death for being found in the streets. The curfew was lifted on the morning of 28 March, and the people of the town began to organize a resistance immediately.

That night, 53 East Pakistani policemen easily overpowered a handful of soldiers at the police station. Then, fanning out to nearby villages with all the .303 Enfield Rifles and ammunition they could carry, the policemen joined forces with 100 college students. The students were teaching guerrilla warfare to local peasants, who were armed only with hatchets, farm tools and bamboo staves. Within two days, the police and students had organized several thousand volunteers and militiamen of the East Pakistan Rifles and laid plans for simultaneous attacks on the five Pakistan Army Positions in Kushtia.

on 31 March, a force of some 5,000 peasants, guerrillas and policemen launched a campaign to capture Kushtia. Thousands of townspeople thronged the streets shouting “Joy Bangla [Hail Bengal]!” The Pakistani soldiers panicked at the thought of being engulfed by so many thousands of furious Bengalis. “We were very surprised” lamented Naik Subhedar (Senior Sergeant) Mohammed Ayub later, following his capture. “We thought the Bengali forces were about the size of one company like ourselves. We didn’t know everybody was against us.” The Bengali fighters made no suicidal, human-wave assaults at Kushtia as they had in some places. But the steady drumfire of hundreds of rifles had a relentless effect on the soldiers of Delta Company. By noon, the government building and district headquarters all fell. Shortly before dawn the next day, about 75 soldiers made a dash for their jeeps and trucks and roared away in a blaze of gunfire. Two Jeeps were halted almost immediately by surging mobs. The Bengalis pulled out the dozen soldiers and killed them on the spot.

The other vehicles were blocked outside town by fallen-tree barricades and 4-ft ditches dug across the blacktop road. The soldiers shot down about 50 Bengalis before they were overwhelmed and killed by peasants. A few soldiers escaped but were later captured and killed.

Before dawn the next day, the last 13 soldiers in Kushtia went out of the radio building and covered 14 miles on foot, before two Bengali militiamen took them as prisoners and brought them back to the Kushtia District Jail. The 13 were the only known survivors of Delta Company's 147 men. Among the West Pakistani dead was Nassim Waquer, a 29-year-old Punjabi who last January had been appointed assistant deputy commissioner at Kushtia. When a mob found his body, they brought it through the streets of the town for half a mile. The next day, the Pakistan Army dispatched another infantry company from Jessore to stage a counterattack on Kushtia. At Bishakali village, halfway to Kushtia, the new company fell into a booby trap set by Bengali guerrillas. two Jeeps in the nine-vehicle army convoy plunged into a deep pit covered with bamboo and vines.

Seventy-three soldiers were killed on the spot, and dozens of others were chased down and killed.

== See also ==
- Battle of Kamalpur
- Tank Ambush at Kushtia
