= ABM Nurul Alam =

Bangladeshi physician & activist

- আবু বারেক মোহাম্মদ নুরুল আলম
- Born: Abu Barek Mohammad Nurul Alam; 12 February 1929; Dhantala, Bengal, British India
- Died: 20 November 1971 (aged 42); Rangpur City, Rajshahi, Bangladesh
- Occupation: Physician
- Known for: Martyred Intellectual

ABM Nurul Alam or Abu Barek Mohammad Nurul Alam was a Bangladesh physician who was killed in the Bangladesh Liberation war. He is considered a martyr in Bangladesh.

== Early life ==
Alam was born in Dhantala, Bochaganj, Dinajpur, British India (now Rangpur, Bangladesh) in 1929. He was involved in the Bengali language movement. He graduated from Dhaka Medical College in 1961 after completing his MBBS.

== Career ==
Alam joined the Santahar Railway Hospital as an assistant surgeon. On 25 March 1971, the Bangladesh Liberation war started with the start of Operation Searchlight. Communal riots broke out between the Bengali and non-Bengali (Bihari) residents of Santahar. He provided medical aid to the injured. On 26 March 1971, he and his family sought refuge in the hospital after the Pakistan Army with the help of non-Bengali people attacked the Bengali people. He and his family moved Haisabari, Naogaon then Shahbazpur, Rajshahi. He moved to Rajshahi town (now city) with the aim to move to India. He was arrested by Pakistan army from a pharmacy in the city on allegations that he helped Mukti Bahini. He was taken to Zoha Hall of Rajshahi University.

== Death ==
Alam was shot and killed on 20 November 1971 while in Pakistan Army custody.
