= Wahiduzzaman =

- অহিদুজ্জামান

Minister of Commerce
- In office June 1962 – 1965

Personal details
- Born: 1912 Faridpur District, Eastern Bengal and Assam, British India
- Died: 21 October 1976 (aged 63–64) Dacca, Bangladesh
- Party: QML (1970–1971)
- Other political affiliations: PMLC (1962–1970); PML (1947–1958); AIML (pre-1947)

Wahiduzzaman also known as Thanda Mia, was a Bangladeshi, politician from Faridpur.

== Early life ==
Wahiduzzaman was born in 1912 at Sitarampur, Gopalganj Subdivision, Faridpur District, Eastern Bengal and Assam, British India. He graduated from Calcutta Islamia College in 1932 and earned a B.L. degree from Calcutta University in 1935. He was part of the Student Union.

== Career ==
Wahiduzzaman became a councilor of All India Muslim League. He was a member of the Bengal Provincial Muslim League working committee. In 1942, he was elected to the Bengal Constituent Assembly. He was an active member of the Pakistan Movement. From 1947 to 1958, he was a member of the working committee of East Pakistan Convention Muslim League and from 1962 to 1969, he was a member of the Convention Muslim League. During fractional disputes in the Muslim League he supported the Qayyum group.

In 1951, Wahiduzzaman was elected to the Constituent Assembly of Pakistan. In 1954, he lost his election to Sheikh Mujibur Rahman, the future President of Bangladesh. In 1962, he was elected to the Pakistan National Assembly from Faridpur-3. He served as the Minister of Commerce in the cabinet of Ayub Khan from 1962 to 1965. He was re-elected from Faridpur in 1965. He lost the election in 1970 from Faridpur-6. He was the Chairman of East Pakistan Cooperative Bank. He founded Zaman Industrial Corporation. He was a Director of the State Bank of Pakistan. He supported Pakistan in the Bangladesh Liberation war.

== Death ==
Wahiduzzaman died on 21 October 1976 in Dhaka, Bangladesh.
