= Satanikhil massacre =

Coordinates: 23.517°N 90.524°E

Satanikhil massacre সাতানিখিল গণহত্যা
- Part of Bangladesh genocide
- Location: Kewar, Dhaka district, East Pakistan
- Date: 14 May 1971 (UTC+6:00)
- Target: Bengali Hindus
- Attack type: Massacre
- Weapon: Light machine guns
- Deaths: 14
- Perpetrator: Pakistani army

Satanikhil massacre refers to the massacre of 14 Bengali Hindu intellectuals on 14 May 1971 on the banks of Satanikhil canal in Dhaka district by the Pakistan armed forces.

== Background ==
The village of Kewar falls under the Mahakali Union of Munshiganj Sadar Upazila in Munshiganj District. In 1971, the village was under Munshiganj police station of Dhaka district. The village was home to the renowned Chowdhury family, related to the Chowdhurys of Muktagachha in Mymensingh. The residence of the Chowdhury was spread over 7 acres and it housed a mutt, built on the tomb of Gourinath Chowdhury a scion of the family.

On 25 March 1971, the Pakistani Army launched Operation Searchlight. In Munshiganj, the army occupied the Haraganga College and set up and army camp. Some of the eminent Bengali Hindus of the region took shelter at the Chowdhury house at Kewar. Every night they used to guard the house in turns to get alerted of the enemy.

== Killings ==
On the early morning of 14 May at around 4 am, a group of around 70 consisting of military men and the collaborators surrounded the Chowdhury house. They broke into the house and took hostage 22 Bengali Hindus. The hostages were taken to the banks of Satanikhil canal, a kilometer away. Sixteen of them were made to stand in a line and burst fired from machine gun. Fourteen of them died on the spot. Two survived, one of them identified as Jitu Bhaumik.

Out of the remaining six persons, Kedareshwar Chowdhury and Dr. Surendra Chandra Saha were taken to the Haraganga College army camp. The former, popularly known as Jala Moktar, was the scion of the Chowdhury family and a pleader at the court and the latter a physician. Kedarshwar was first let off but again arrested and taken to the camp. The two were subjected to torture and finally killed. The dead bodies were dumped in a nearby beel. Two rickshaw pullers who went to see the corpses were also killed. The remaining four managed to escape by tricking their captors. One of them, Chandan Ambuli, managed to convince his captors that he was a Muslim.
