= Ayesha Bedora Choudhury =

Pakistani physician

- আয়েশা বেদোরা চৌধুরী
- Pronunciation: Āẏēśā Bēdōrā Caudhurī
- Born: 6 April 1935; Calcutta, Bengal, British India (now West Bengal, India)
- Died: 16 December 1971 (aged 36); Dacca, Bangladesh
- Education: Victoria Institution; Calcutta National Medical College
- Known for: Martyred Intellectual

Ayesha Bedora Choudhury (1935–1971) was a Bangladeshi doctor who was killed in the Bangladesh Liberation war and is considered a martyr in Bangladesh.

== Early life ==
Ayesha was born on 6 April 1935 in Kolkata, West Bengal, British Raj. Her parents were Imaduddin Choudhury and Kaniz Fatema Mahmud. She graduated from Victoria Institution of Kolkata in 1951. She studied MBBS in the Calcutta National Medical College and graduated in 1956. During her studies she received two gold medals for outstanding academic achievements. She was involved with left wing politics on campus.

== Career ==
Ayesha's first job was in Gauhati Government Hospital in Guwahati, Assam, India. She moved to Dhaka, East Pakistan, Pakistan, and joined Dhaka Medical College and Hospital. Afterwards she worked in the State Bank of Pakistan as a Medical officer. On 25 March 1971, Bangladesh Liberation war started. During the war she provided medical treatment to the Pro Independence Mukti Bahini and gave them shelter.

== Death ==
On 16 December 1971 Pakistan forces surrendered to an allied force of Indian Armed Forces and the Mukti Bahini through the Pakistani Instrument of Surrender. That day she went to Bangabandhu Bhaban in 18 Dhanmondi, the personal residence of the President of Bangladesh Sheikh Mujibur Rahman. In the Bangabandhu Bhaban, the wife of Sheikh Mujibur Rahman, Begum Fazilatunnesa, and their two daughters, Sheikh Rehana and Sheikh Hasina. When her car came near the gate, the Pakistani soldiers who were stationed there and did not know Pakistan had surrendered fired at her car. She and her chauffeur were killed in the firing.
