= Shamsuddin Ahmed (surgeon) =

Medical doctor killed during the Bangladesh Liberation war (1920-1971)

Dr. Shamsuddin Ahmed
- শামসুদ্দিন আহমদ
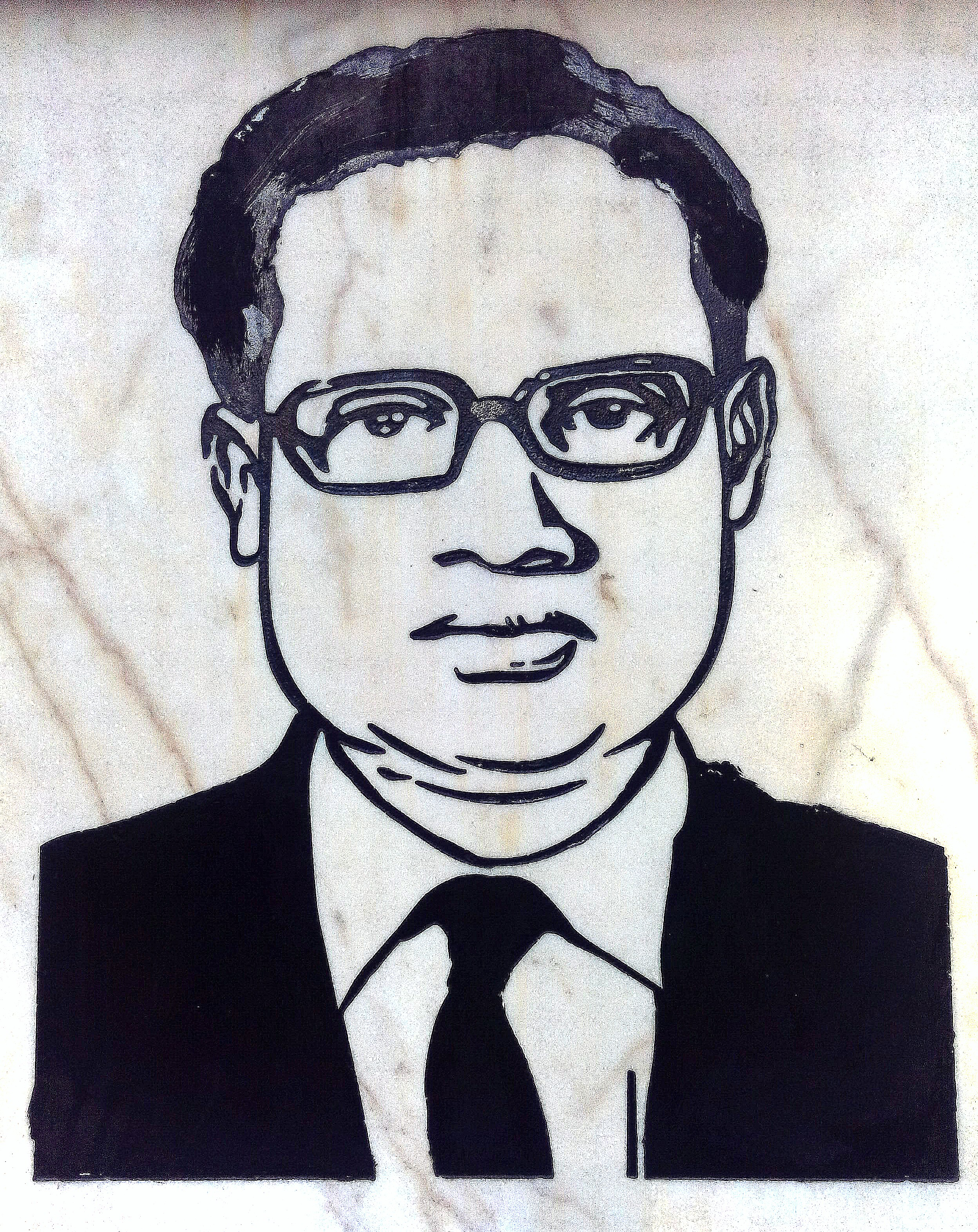

Personal details
- Born: 1 August 1920 Sylhet, Assam, British India
- Died: 9 April 1971 (aged 50) Sylhet, Chittagong, Bangladesh
- Parents: Imanuddin Ahmed (father); Rasheda Begum (mother)
- Education: Murari Chand College; Calcutta Medical College
- Known for: Martyred Intellectual

Shamsuddin Ahmed (Bengali: শামসুদ্দিন আহমদ; 1 August 1920 – 9 April 1971) was an East Pakistan medical doctor who was killed in the Bangladesh Liberation war and considered a martyr in Bangladesh.

== Early life ==
Ahmed was born on 1 August 1920 to a Bengali Muslim family in Ambarkhana, Sylhet, British Raj. His father, Imanuddin Ahmed, worked in the Ministry of Railways, and his mother's name was Rasheda Begum. He completed his matriculation from Sylhet Government High School in 1939, and his Intermediate of Arts from the Murari Chand College in 1941. He graduated with an MBBS from Calcutta Medical College in 1946, and gained his FRCS from the Royal College of Physicians and Surgeons in the United Kingdom.

== Career ==
Ahmed joined the Dhaka Medical College in 1947 as the house surgeon. The following year, he moved to Comilla Hospital as the chief and then Narayan Nagar School Hospital in 1952. In 1953, he started teaching at Sir Salimullah Medical College. From 1954 to 1955, he was the resident surgeon of Dhaka Medical College. He was the founding President of Pakistan Ambulance Corps. From 1955 to 1957 he was teaching the department of surgery in Chittagong Medical College. In 1962 he completed his Fellowship of the Royal Colleges of Surgeons from the Royal College of Physicians and Surgeons in London, after which he served as an assistant professor in the Department of Surgery in Rajshahi Medical College from 1962 to 1964.

From 1964 to 1967 he was the Civil surgeon of Sylhet. After which, he again worked as an Associate Professor of Department of Surgery in Rajshahi Medical College from 1967 to 1969. In 1969 he joined as the head of the department of surgery in Sylhet Medical College. After the start of Operation Searchlight on 25 March 1971 and the start of Bangladesh Liberation war, he started treating people injured in the conflicts. He established a blood bank and provided medical supplies to Mukti Bahini. He testified to an Italian investigation team against the actions of Pakistan Army. Most of the staff of the hospital had left.

== Death and legacy ==
Three Pakistan Army soldiers were killed in fight with members of Mukti Bahini on 9 April 1971 near Sylhet Medical College. Pakistan army surrounded the Hospital but the members of the Mukti Bahini were able to disperse. Major Riyaz led a team of Pakistani army soldiers into the medical college. They took out Ahmed and eight other hospital staff from the hospital and executed them. They were buried inside the hospital compound. Doctor Shamsuddin Hall, a dorm of Sylhet Medical College, is named after him. On 14 December 1997, Bangladesh Post Office released commemorative stamps of him.
