= Mohammad Sadat Ali =

Bengali academic

- মোহাম্মদ সাদাত আলী
- Pronunciation: Mōhām'mada sādāta ālī
- Born: 28 January 1942; Narsingdi, Bengal, British India
- Disappeared: 26 April 1971 (aged 29); Shahbag, Dhaka, Bangladesh
- Monuments: Bangladesh Post Office Stamps
- Known for: Martyred Intellectual

Mohammad Sadat Ali was a Bengali intellectual, an academic, who was killed by the Pakistan army during the Bangladesh Liberation war and is considered a "Martyr" in Bangladesh.

== Early life ==
Ali was born in Rasulpur, Narsingdi Sadar Thana, Narsingdi District on 28 January 1942. He graduated from Gazipur Gachha High School in 1958 and from Narsingdi College in 1960. He completed Bcom in 1963 and Mcom in 1964 from Dhaka University.

== Career ==
He joined Narsingdi College as a lecturer. He joined Institute of Education and Research of Dhaka University as a lecturer in 1968. In 1969, he completed his PhD on education from Northern Colorado University. He was promoted to assistant professor in 1969. From 1969 to 1971 he was the chairman of the department of business administration at the institute. He was the house tutor of Masterda Surya Sen Hall (then Jinnah Hall) of Dhaka University.

== Death and legacy ==
He was arrested by Pakistan Army near his official residence on 26 April 1971. He was never seen again. On 14 December 1971 Bangladesh Post Office issued stamps with his name on Martyred Intellectuals Day.
