= Muhammad Shafi (dentist) =

Dentist Surgeon

Muhammad Shafi (1915–1971) was a Bangladeshi dental surgeon who was killed in the Bangladesh Liberation war. Shafi is considered a martyr in Bangladesh.

== Early life ==
Shafi was born in Dighira, Hooghly, West Bengal, British India on 5 April 1915. He graduated from Hughli Zila High School in 1930 and from Hawrah Government College in 1932. He completed a diploma degree in dentistry from Calcutta Dental College in 1936, and in 1942 he obtained a BDS from the same college.

== Career ==
Shafi joined R. Ahmed Dental Laboratory as a dental surgeon, and later worked at Calcutta Medical College. He had a private practice in Baubazar Street in Kolkata. After the Partition of India, he moved to Chittagong, East Pakistan. He established a private practice in Enayet Bazar.

In 1964, he won the National Bank Literary Award for his book Jana-samkha O Sampad.

In 1971, he supported the non-cooperation movement. He helped the Mukti Bahini in the Bangladesh Liberation war, which started on 25 March. He helped the staff of Chittagong Radio Station with the establishment of Swadhin Bangla Betar Kendra, which was opened in his residence.

== Death ==
On 7 April 1971, Shafi was detained by Pakistan Army, but was released on the recommendation of Brigadier Mirza Aslam Beg, a patient of his. His house was raided by Major Bokhari. Major Bokhari searched the residence and found weapons stored for Mukti Bahini. Shafi was arrested with his brother in law, lawyer Khondakar Ehsanul Haque. Both were never seen again and assumed to be dead. His wife, Mushtari Shafi, and his children survived.

On 14 December 1999, Bangladesh Post Office issued commemorative stamps with his name.
