= Mir Abdul Qayyum =

Bangladeshi psychologist and martyr (1939–1971)

- মীর আব্দুল কাইয়ুম
- Pronunciation: Mīra Ābdula Kā'iẏuma
- Born: 6 July 1939; Ghagra, Gaffargaon, Mymensingh
- Died: 25 November 1971 (aged 32)

Mir Abdul Qayyum was a Bangladeshi psychologist who was killed in the Bangladesh Liberation war and is considered a martyr in Bangladesh.

== Biography ==
Qayyum was born in Ghagra, Gaffargaon, Mymensingh on 6 July 1939. He graduated from Gafargaon Islamia High School in 1956 and from Gafargaon College in 1958. He graduated from Ananda Mohan College in 1960 and studied M. A. in psychology in Rajshahi University graduating in 1962.

Qayyum taught in Kandipara Asgar Ali High School and in Gafargaon College. He joined Rajshahi University as a lecturer in the Department of Psychology in 1966 and previously worked at the research centre of the department. He participated in the mass uprising in East Pakistan in 1969.

Qayyum was arrested by the Pakistan Army on 25 November 1971. He was buried alive along with others by the Pakistan Army.
