= Khondakar Abul Kashem =

- Born: 3 January 1944; Chomarpur, Santhia, Pabna
- Died: 9 September 1971 (aged 27); Pabna, Bangladesh
- Education: Rajshahi University
- Occupation: College academic

Khondakar Abul Kashem (3 January 1944 – 9 September 1971) was a Bengali educator and of the former East Pakistan, now Bangladesh. He was one of the Bengali intellectuals killed by the Pakistan Army's paramilitary Razakars during the 1971 Bangladesh Genocide.

== Early life ==
Kashem was born on 3 January 1944 in Chomarpur, Santhia, Pabna to Khondakar Nawab Ali and Sahera Khatoon. In 1960, he graduated from Rajarhat High School. In 1964, he graduated from Pabna Edward College. In 1966, he completed a Bachelor of Education from Dhaka University. In 1969, he finished an MA in history from Rajshahi University.

== Career ==
In 1966, Kashem joined Kashinathpur A L High School after graduation in Pabna. In 1970, he joined as lecturer of history in Pabna Edward College. He spent 6 months in the Pakistan Cadet Corps in Savar. At the start of the Bangladesh Liberation War in 1971, he returned to his village to encouraged the youths to join the war. He organized supplies for the Mukti Bahini.

== Assassination ==
He was returning to his village from Pabna on 9 September 1971 when he was kidnapped by Razakars near the Chhondaha bridge. He remained missing after that.
