= Rayer Bazaar =

Thoroughfare in Dhaka, Bangladesh

Coordinates: 23°N 90°E

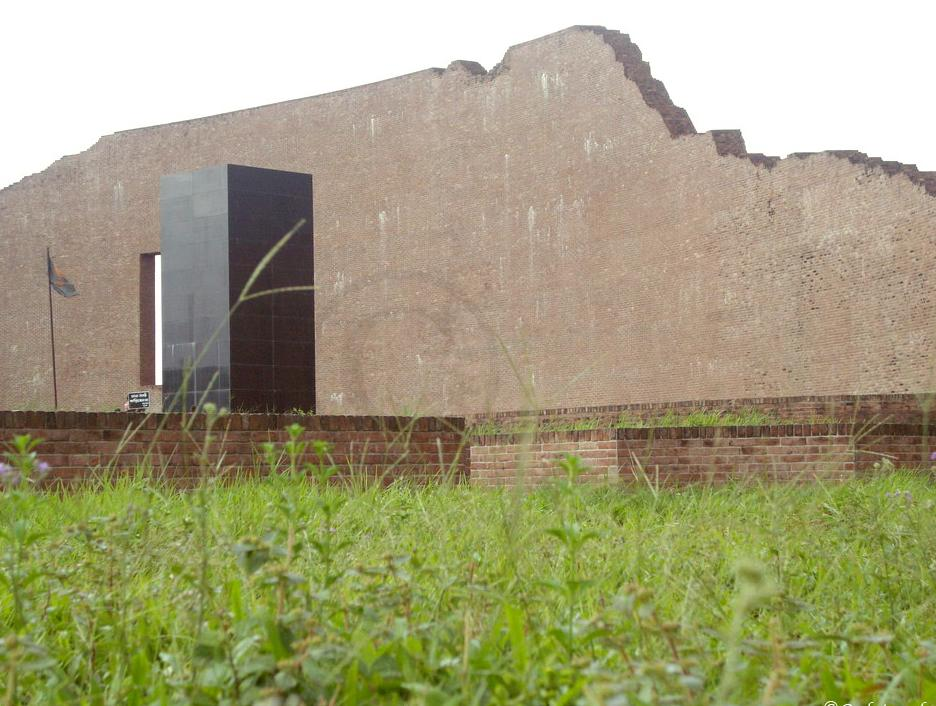
Martyred Intellectuals Memorial at Rayerbazar, Dhaka.

Rayer Bazaar is a well-known thoroughfare in Dhaka, the capital city of Bangladesh. It is generally regarded as one of the historical areas of the city. Rayer Bazaar was likely founded during the colonial period in the 19th century. The thoroughfare was likely first settled by potters beside the Turag River and was also likely named after someone titled Ray. It was easy to find the clays used to make pots in this area and spread it around by boats, as they were situated near the river.

== Address ==
Rayer Bazaar Bodhdhobhumi is located in Mohammadpur Thana, near the Beribadh area in Dhaka District. This area is mainly an extension of the originally

settled area beside the Turag River. The Martyred Intellectuals Memorial began construction there on 14 December 1996 after a groundbreaking ceremony officiated by the daughter of Prime Minister Sheikh Hasina; it was completed in 1999.

== History ==
During the Mughal Empire period, the thoroughfare was famous for pottery. Most of the potters of what is now Dhaka District used to live there because the famous laal mati (red clay) was readily available in this area. During the Mughal and British colonial periods, the red clay was unavailable in the neighbourhoods; thus, the potters of Rayer Bazaar have a long tradition of working with this red clay. According to Dr. Wise, this place was known as "Kumartoli" during the Mughal period.

On the night of 14 December 1971, many of Bangladesh's intellectuals, including professors, journalists, doctors, artists, engineers, and writers, were rounded up in Dhaka. They were blindfolded and taken to torture cells in Mirpur, Mohammadpur, Nakhalpara, Rajarbagh, and other locations in different sections of the city. Later, they were executed and thrown into the swamps of Rayer Bazaar. Dhaka.

== Martyred Intellectuals Memorial ==
In memory of the martyred intellectuals of 1971, a memorial was erected there. The 'Al-Badr' and 'Al-Shams' forces helped the West Pakistan Army locate the intellectuals and slaughtered them and many other innocent people at night. After the massacre, they brought the corpses and left them in the swamps of Rayer Bazaar. After the Liberation War, the people of Dhaka found out that all the dead bodies of many great intellectuals and innocent people were piled up there." The Martyred Intellectuals Memorial is built in memory of the martyred intellectuals of 1971. It is located in the Boddhobhumi at Rayer Bazaar.

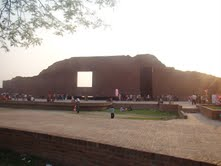
Rayer Bazaar Bodhdhobhumi Smritishoudho

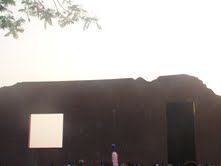
Rayer Bazaar Bodhdhobhumi Smritishoudho

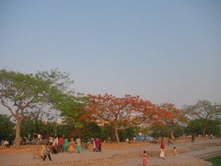
Rayer Bazaar Bodhdhobhumi Smritishoudho

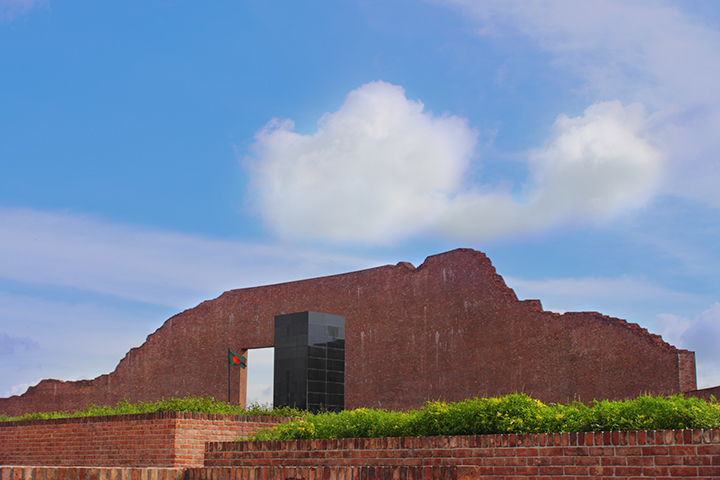
Martyr's intellectual monument rayer bazar

== Present condition ==
To this day, Rayer Bazaar has become a densely populated area. The area is heavily polluted, and the standard of living is very low there. "The old pottery tradition is almost over. We can hardly find two or three potters in here". The tannery at Hajaribaag near the Rayer Bazaar Boddhobhumi is one of the main reasons for heavy pollution in the area; overpopulation has also created severe water problems there. But day by day this area is getting a touch of modernity. Earlier there were dense slums, but now many tall buildings have been built here. The slums here are constantly being demolished, and apartments are being built. As a result, the quality of people living in this area has increased slightly compared to before.

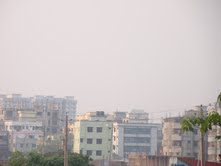
Present condition at Rayer Bazaar

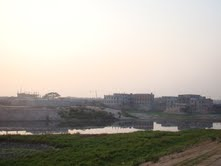
Present condition at Rayer Bazaar
