= Fazlur Rahman Khan (geologist) =

Bangladeshi intellectual and geologist

Fazlur Rahman Khan (1939–1971) was a Bangladeshi intellectual and geologist, who was killed in the Bangladesh Liberation war and is considered a martyr in Bangladesh.

== Early life ==
Khan was born in Kajiati in Mohanganj Upazila, Netrokona on 2 March 1939. He graduated from Mohanganj High School in 1954 and Ananda Mohan College in 1956. He completed his BSc with honors in soil science from Dhaka University in 1960 and MSc in 1962.

== Career ==
Khan joined Dhaka University in 1963 as a lecturer in soil science. In 1964 he went to England to pursue his PhD from the University of London. His research topic was Nutrient Metabolism in Soil at High Moisture Level. He returned to Dhaka University after completion of his PhD in 1968 and was promoted to senior lecturer.

== Death ==
On 25 March 1971, at the start of Operation Searchlight, Pakistan Army attacked his home in Nilkhet residential area. He was shot and killed as was his nephew Kanchan in the early morning of 26 March 1971. Both were buried in Azimpur graveyard.
