= Mohammad Moazzem Hossain =

Educationist killed in Bangladesh Liberation War by Razakars

Mohammad Moazzem Hossain is a Bangladeshi educationist who was killed in the Bangladesh Liberation war by Razakars. He is considered a martyr in Bangladesh.

== Early life ==
Hossain was born in Badokhali, Bagerhat sadar, Bagerhat, East Bengal, British India on 1 December 1932. He graduated from Kajdia High Madrasa in 1948, and completed his BA in 1952 from Government P.C. College, Bagerhat. In 1954, he received his M.A. in economics from University of Dhaka.

== Career ==
In 1954 Hossain joined the Chitalmari High School as its headmaster. In 1955, he joined the Government P.C. College as an economics lecturer. By 1971 he was the head of the college's economics department. On 25 March 1971, the Bangladesh Liberation war started. Hossain organised the youth in the locality to help refugees move to India, and to send youths in India for military training. He himself received training in camps in India and returned to Bangladesh on October. He was assigned in the Bagerhat sub-sector as the administrative officer under the command of Subedar Tajul Islam, and engaged in a number of battles against the Pakistan Army.

== Death and legacy ==
On 28 October 1971, on his way home, Hossain was shot and killed by Razakars, a militia raised by the Pakistan Army.

In 1995, the Shaheed Professor Moazzem Foundation was established in Bagerhat to preserve his memory. On 14 December 1997, the Bangladesh Post Office issued commemorative stamps in his honour. In 2001, he posthumously received the Visva Bangali Sammelon Award.
