= List of Ekushey Padak award recipients (2010–2019) =

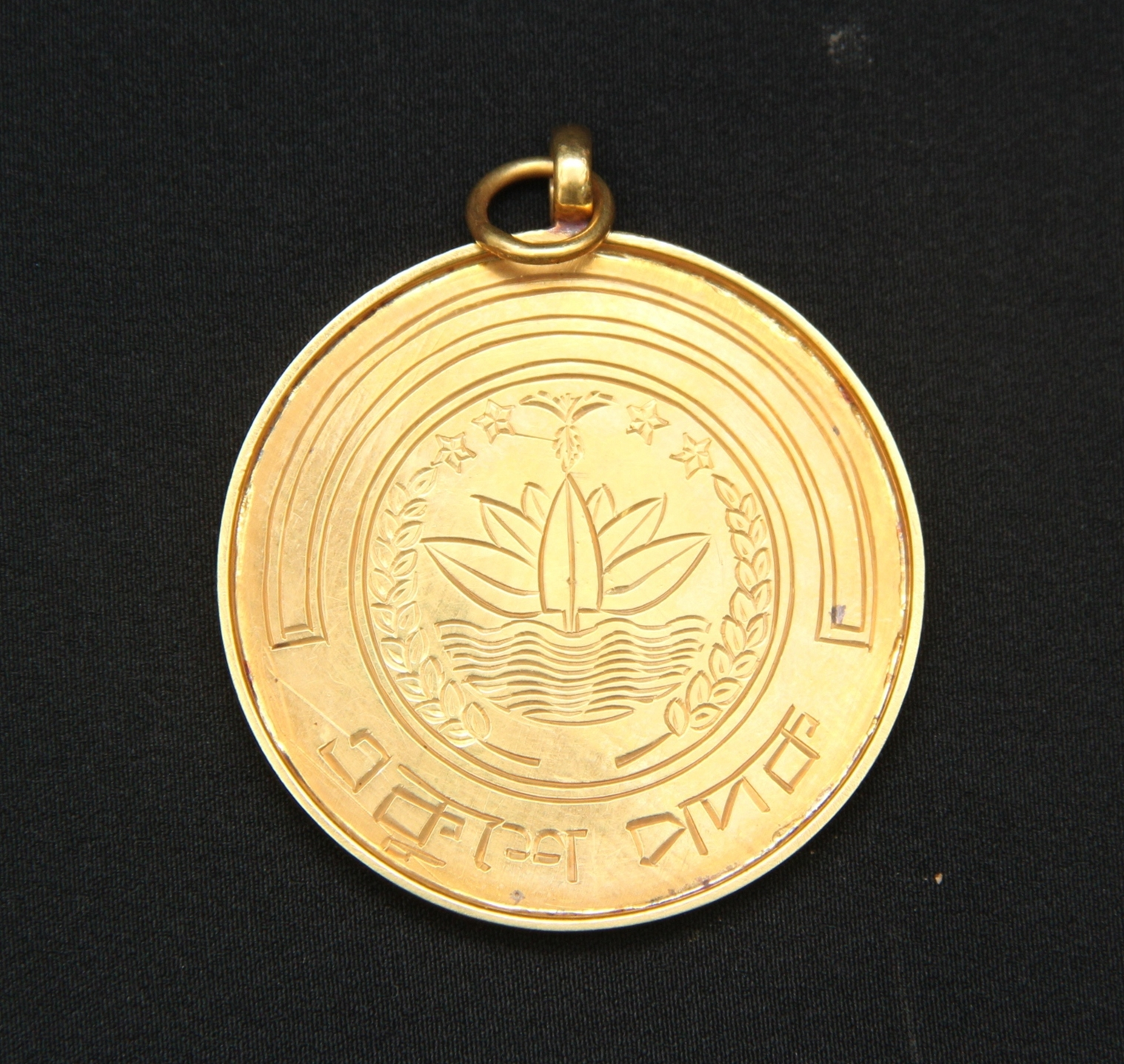
List of Ekushey Padak award recipients
- 1976–1979
- 1980–1989
- 1990–1999
- 2000–2009
- 2010–2019
- 2020–2029

Ekushey Padak (Bengali: একুশে পদক; lit: "Twentyfirst Award") is the second highest civilian award in Bangladesh, introduced in memory of the martyrs of the Bengali language movement of 1952. The award is given to recognize contributions in a number of fields, including culture, education, and economics. The Ministry of Cultural Affairs administers the award.

The award consists of an 18 carat gold medal weighing 3 tolas and a certificate of honour. The medal was designed by the artist Nitun Kundu. The amount of the cash reward was originally ৳ 25,000, but it was subsequently increased to ৳ 100,000 as of February 2015

== 2010 ==
Ekushey Padak was awarded to 15 people.

1. Sayeed Ahmed, literature (posthumous)
2. Mohammad Alam, photojournalism (posthumous)
3. Ahmed Imtiaz Bulbul, music artiste
4. Hanif Sangket, social personality
5. Laila Hasan, artiste
6. Imdad Hossain, artist
7. Helena Khan, literature
8. Partha Pratim Majumder, mime artiste
9. Muntassir Mamoon, research
10. Sangharaj Jyotipal Mohathero, social personality (posthumous)
11. Golam Moula, Language Movement (posthumous)
12. Mohammad Rafiq, literature
13. AKM Abdur Rouf, artist (posthumous)
14. ASHK Sadik, social personality (posthumous)
15. Nasiruddin Yousuff, artiste

== 2011 ==
Ekushey Padak was awarded to 13 people.

1. Mosharef Uddin Ahmed, Language Movement (posthumous)
2. Shawkat Ali, Language Movement (posthumous)
3. Nurjahan Begum, journalism
4. Jyotsna Biswas, performing arts
5. Abdul Haq Choudhury, research (posthumous)
6. Abdul Haque, language and literature
7. Amanul Haque, Language Movement
8. Md Abul Hashem, social service
9. Mohammed Delwar Hossain, social service
10. Shaheed Quaderi, language and literature
11. Ustad Akthar Sadmani, performing arts (posthumous)
12. Abdul Karim Shah, performing arts
13. Polan Sarkar, social service

== 2012 ==
Ekushey Padak was awarded to 15 people.

1. Humayun Azad, language and literature (posthumous)
2. Mubinul Azim, fine arts (posthumous)
3. Mumtaz Begum, Language Movement (posthumous)
4. Baren Chakraborthi, science and technology
5. Ehtesham Haydar Chowdhury, journalism (posthumous)
6. Karunamoy Goswami, fine arts
7. Enamul Haque, fine arts
8. A.K. Nazmul Karim, education (posthumous)
9. Monsur Alam Khan, education
10. Suddhananda Mahathero, social work
11. Tareque Masud, fine arts (posthumous)
12. Habibur Rahman Milon (journalism)
13. Ashfaque Munier, journalism (posthumous)
14. Mamunur Rashid, fine arts
15. Ajoy Kumar Roy, education

== 2013 ==
Ekushey Padak was awarded to 13 people.

1. Rafiq Azad, language and literature
2. Asad Chowdhury, language and literature
3. Samson H. Chowdhury, social service (posthumous)
4. Udichi Shilpi Gosthi (arts)
5. Ajit Kumar Guha, Language Movement (posthumous)
6. Jamaluddin Hossain, arts
7. Mohammad Kamruzzaman, Language Movement (posthumous)
8. Kaderi Kibria, arts
9. Tofazzal Hossain, Language Movement
10. Nurjahan Murshid, social service (posthumous)
11. Bijoy Sarkar, arts (posthumous)
12. Enamul Haque Mostafa Shahid, Liberation War.
13. MA Wadud, Language Movement (posthumous)

== 2014 ==
Ekushey Padak was awarded to 15 people.

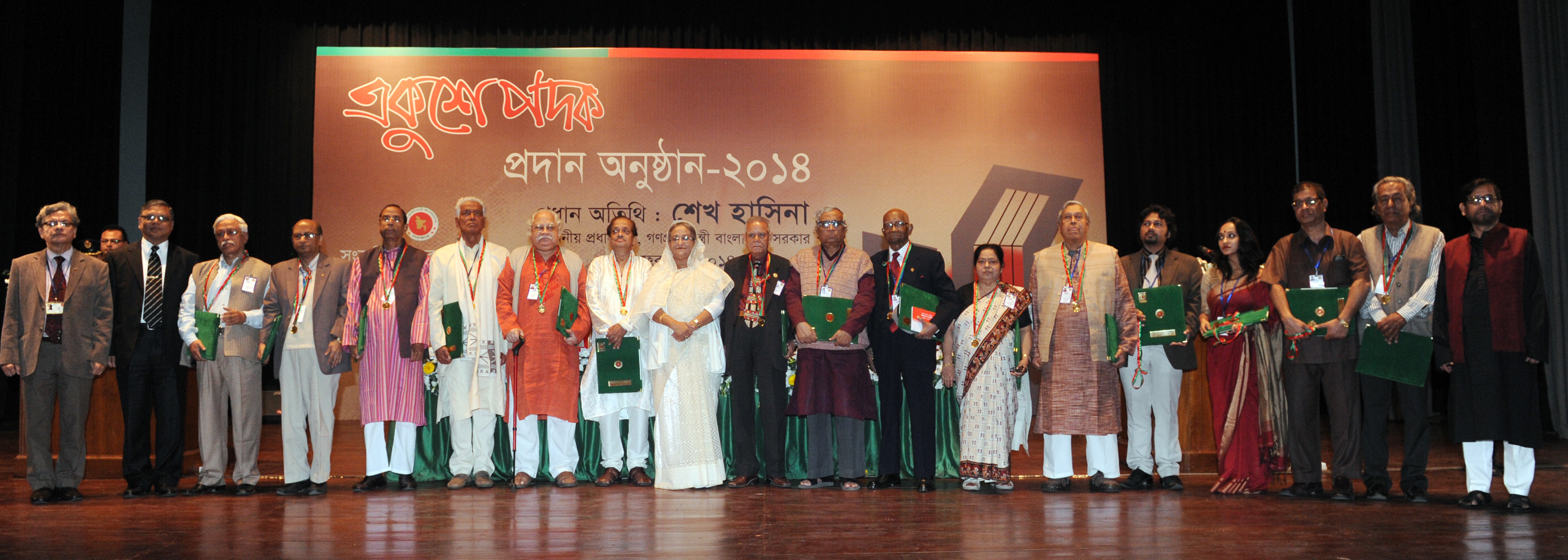
Winners of Ekushey Padak 2014

1. Badrul Alam, Language Movement (posthumous)
2. Biprodas Barua, language and literature
3. Belal Chowdhury, language and literature
4. Jamil Chowdhury, language and literature
5. Samarjit Roy Chowdhury, arts
6. Ramkanai Das, arts
7. Rashid Haider, language and literature
8. Shamsul Huda, Language Movement
9. Enamul Huq, research
10. Keramat Moula, arts
11. Mujibur Rahman, social service
12. Golam Sarwar, journalism
13. Anupam Sen, education
14. Abdus Shakur, language and literature (posthumous)
15. SM Solaiman, arts (posthumous)

== 2015 ==
Ekushey Padak was awarded to 15 people.

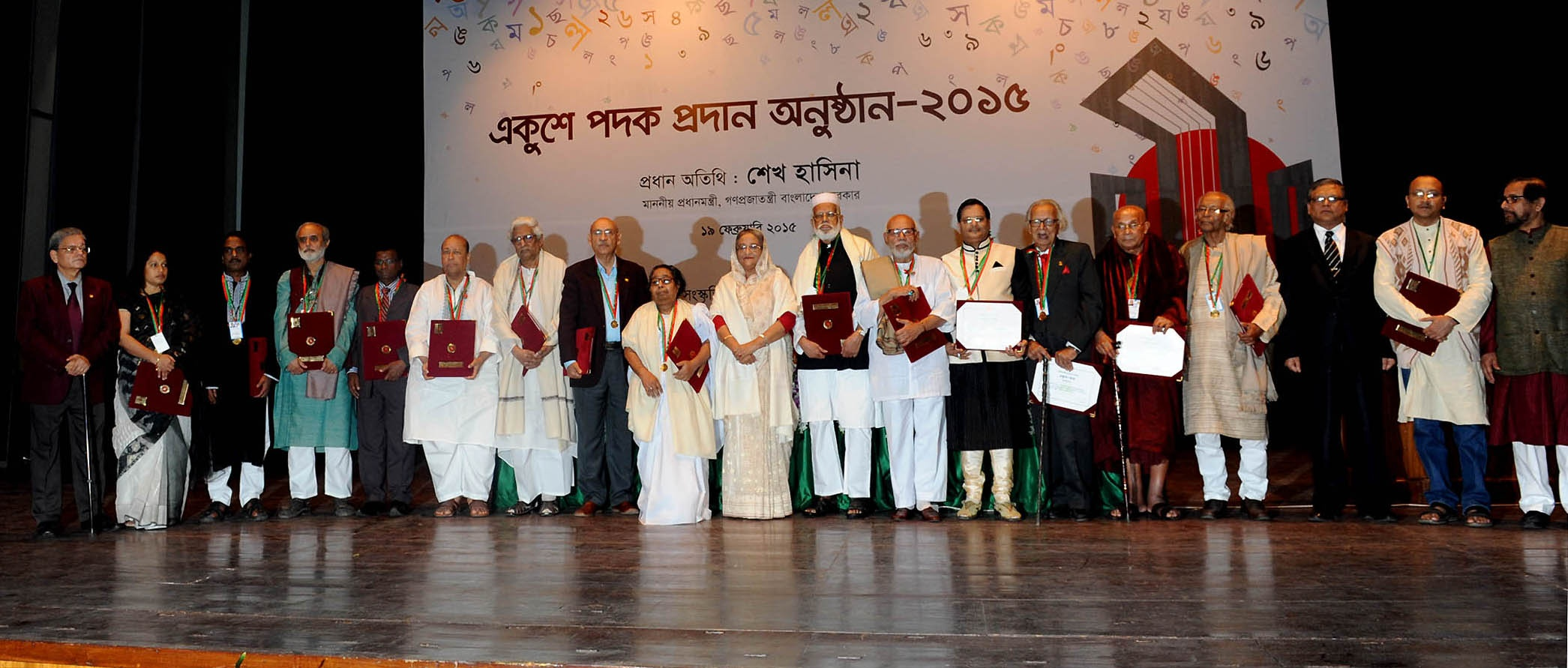

1. Abdur Rahman Boyati, arts (posthumous)
2. Arup Ratan Choudhury, social service
3. Jharna Dhara Chowdhury, social service
4. SA Abul Hayat, arts
5. Mohammad Nurul Huda, language and literature
6. Kamal Lohani, journalism
7. MA Mannan, education
8. Satya Priya Mahathero, social service
9. Mujibur Rahman Devdas, Liberation War
10. Faridur Reza Sagar, mass media
11. Sanat Kumar Saha, education
12. Pearu Sardar, Language Movement (posthumous)
13. ATM Shamsuzzaman, arts
14. Dwijen Sharma, language and literature
15. Abul Kalam Mohammed Zakaria, research

== 2016 ==
Ekushey Padak was awarded to 16 people.

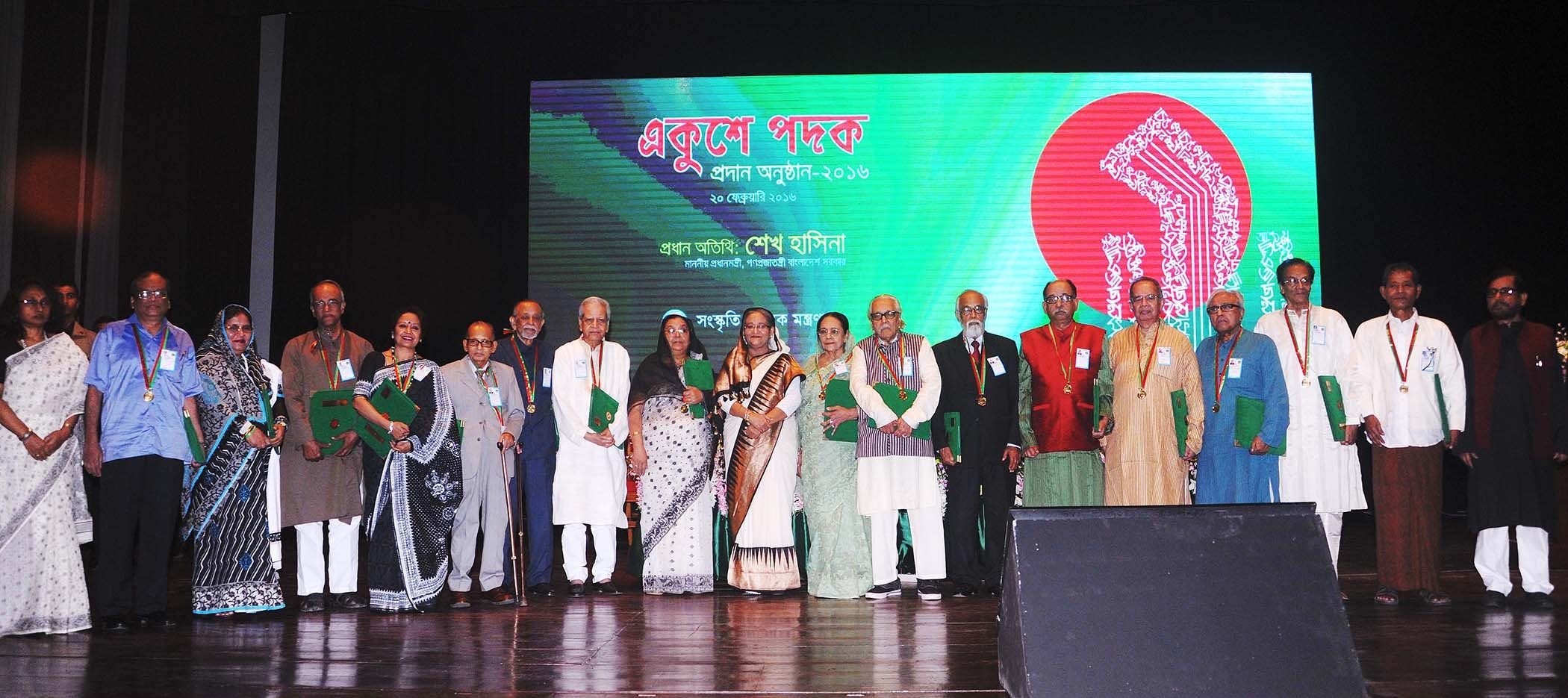

1. Kazi Ebadul Haque, language movement
2. Sayed Haider, language movement
3. Syed Golam Kibria, language movement (posthumous)
4. Jasim Uddin Ahmed, language movement
5. Jahanara Ahmed, arts (television and film)
6. Pandit Amaresh Roy Chowdhury, arts (classical music)
7. Shaheen Samad, arts (music)
8. Amanul Haque, arts (dance)
9. Kazi Anowar Hossain, arts (painting) (posthumous)
10. Mofidul Hoque, Liberation War
11. Toab Khan, journalism
12. ABM Abdullah, research
13. Mongsen Ching Monsin, research
14. Jyoti Prakash Dutta, language and literature
15. Hayat Mamud, language and literature
16. Habibullah Siraji, language and literature

== 2017 ==
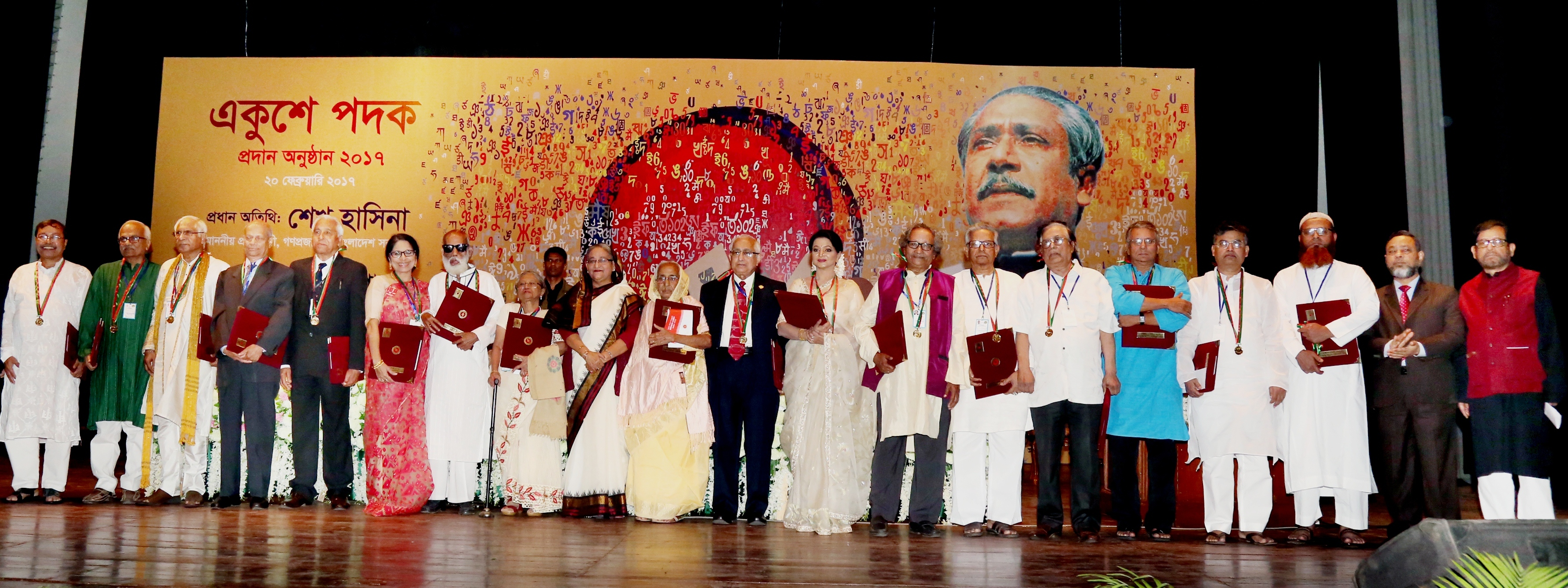

The award was given to 17 persons.

1. Sharifa Khatun, language movement
2. Shushama Das, music
3. Julhas Uddin Ahmed, music
4. Ustad Azizul Islam, music
5. Tanvir Mokammel, film
6. Syed Abdullah Khalid, sculpture
7. Sara Zaker, acting
8. Abul Momen, journalism
9. Syed Akram Hossain, research
10. Alamgir Muhammad Serajuddin, education
11. Jamilur Reza Choudhury, science and technology
12. Mahmud Hassan, social welfare
13. Omar Ali, language and literature
14. Sukumar Barua, language and literature
15. Swadesh Roy, journalism
16. Shamim Ara Nipa, choreography
17. Rahmatullah Al Mahmud Selim, music

== 2018 ==
The award was given to 21 persons.

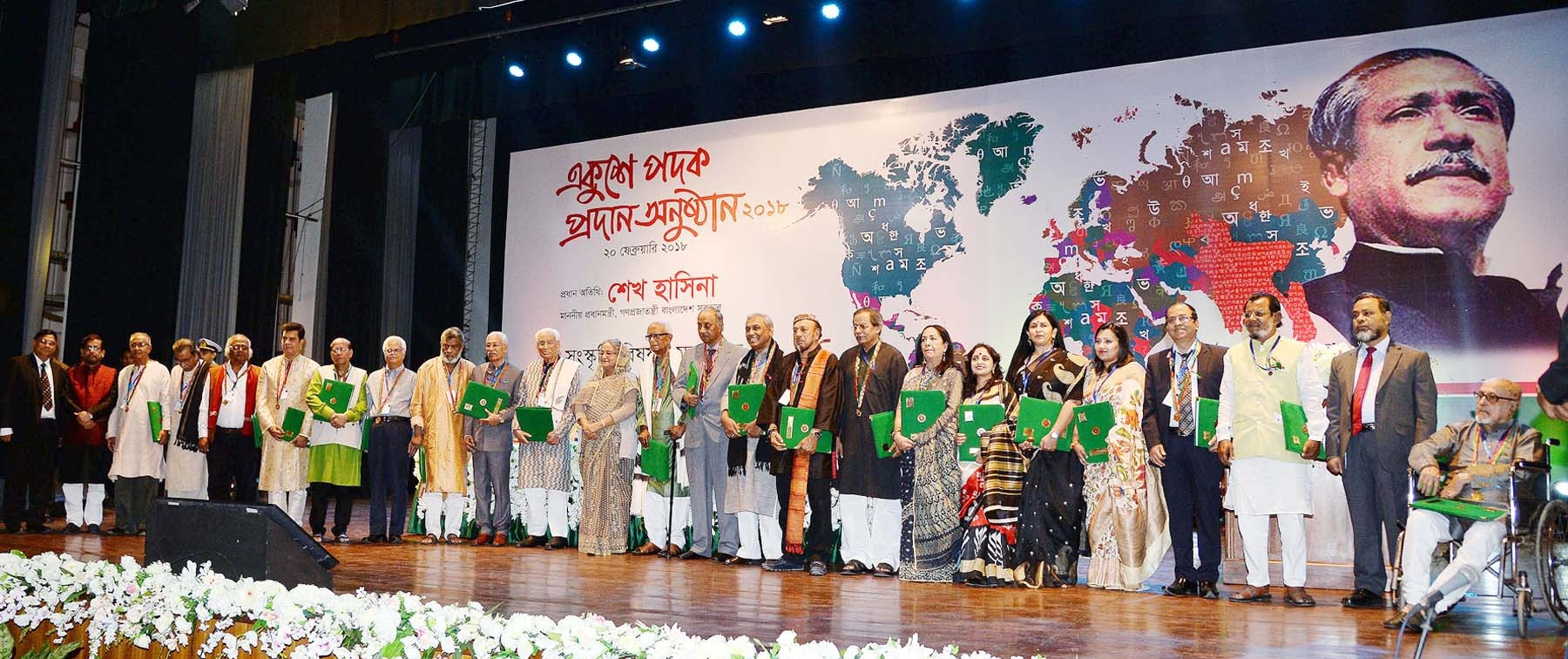

1. AZM Takiullah (language movement)
2. Mirza Mazharul Islam (language movement)
3. Sheikh Sadi Khan (music)
4. Shujeo Shyam (music)
5. Indra Mohan Rajbongshi (music)
6. Khurshid Alam (music)
7. Motiul Haque Khan (music)
8. Minu Haque (dance)
9. Humayun Faridi (acting)
10. Nikhil Sen (drama)
11. Kalidas Karmakar (fine arts)
12. Golam Mustofa (photography)
13. Ranesh Maitra (journalism)
14. Zulekha Haque (research)
15. Muinul Islam (economics)
16. Ilias Kanchan (social service)
17. Syed Manzoorul Islam (language and literature)
18. Saiful Islam Khan (poet Hayat Saef) (language and literature)
19. Subrata Barua (language and literature)
20. Rabiul Hussain (language and literature)
21. Khalekdad Chowdhury (language and literature)

== 2019 ==
The award was given to 21 persons.

1. Halima Khatun (posthumous - Language Movement)
2. Ghulam Arieff Tipoo (language Movement)
3. Monowara Islam (Language Movement)
4. Azam Khan (posthumous - music)
5. Subir Nandi (music)
6. Khairul Anam Shakil (music)
7. Liaquat Ali Lucky (art)
8. Suborna Mustafa (art)
9. Lucky Enam (art)
10. Sayeeda Khanam (photography)
11. Jamal Uddin Ahmed (fine art)
12. Khitindra Chandra Baishya (War of Liberation)
13. Biswajit Ghosh (research)
14. Mahbubul Haque (research)
15. Pranab Kumar Barua (education)
16. Harishankar Jaladas (language and literature)
17. Moinul Ahsan Saber (language and literature)
18. Anwara Syed Haq (language and literature)
19. Ashim Saha (language and literature)
20. Imdadul Haq Milan (language and literature)
21. Rizia Rahman (language and literature)
