= Photography in Bangladesh =

Photography in Bangladesh began with the creation of Bangladesh through the liberation war of 1971, against Pakistan. At the time, inevitably, war time photography was of utmost prominence, which has also largely helped document history. Since the war, photography and photojournalism have come to include and cover a large array of subjects including landscape, politics, wildlife, fashion etc.

Photography was introduced and developed as an institutional and academic discipline through personal efforts, without any significant assistance or support from the government.

== History ==
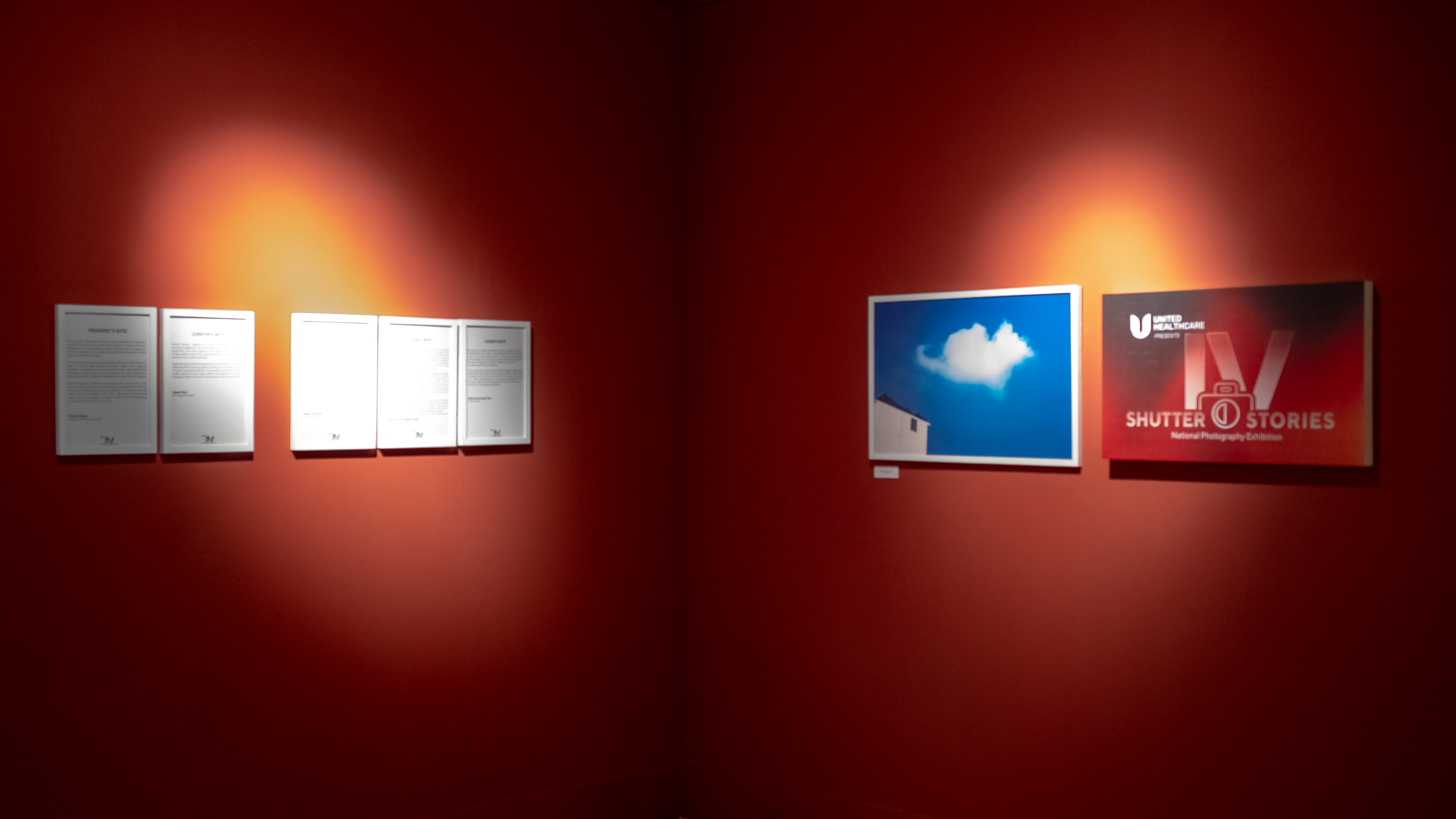
Shutter Stories photo exhibition organized by the photography club of United International University

=== Early Phase and Colonial Period ===
Photography was introduced in this region during British colonial rule, coinciding with the widespread adoption of camera technology across the Indian subcontinent. According to historical records, Darogah Abbas Ali is considered among the early photographers of the region. His work was documented in the Lucknow Album, which is an important historical record of early photography in the Bengal region.

First National Street Photography Festival in La Galerie, Alliance Française de Dhaka

== Post-independence ==
Since the liberation of Bangladesh in 1971, the socio-economic, political, cultural, educational, and technical aspects of photography have gradually transformed. This transformation is distinctive in terms of chronology, theme, and genre, alongside the strengthening of individual styles among photographers.

During the 1971 Bangladesh Liberation War, photography played a crucial role in documenting the conflict and its human dimensions, bringing these realities to international attention. It primarily captured two major aspects: the tyranny, abuse, and genocide carried out by the Pakistani army, and the preparation, training, and struggle of the people—largely civilians—for freedom. Notable photographers of that time include Aftab Ahmed, Naib Uddin Ahmed, Manzoor Alam Beg, Amanul Haque, Anwar Hossain, and Rashid Talukder, among others.

Immediately after independence, photographers documented the country's reconstruction, social conditions, and societal changes, primarily through documentary approaches. Photographic organizations that were active or established during the post-independence period include Camera Recreation Club (CRC), Bangladesh Photographic Society (BPS), Alok Chitra Shilpi Sansad (ASS), Chittagong Photographic Society (CPS), Bangladesh Alokchitra Federation (BAF), Drik Picture Library Limited, MAP Agency of Photography (MAP), Aalok Group of Photographers, Bangladesh Photographic Council (BPC), Bangladesh Photographic Association (BPA), and Photographers Welfare Association of Bangladesh (PWAB). These organizations contributed to the growth and development of photography by supporting local photographers through competitions, exhibitions, national contests, as well as training, workshops, libraries, and darkroom facilities.

=== Development as an Organized Practice (1980s–1990s) ===
In the 1980s and 1990s, photography became established as a formal art and professional practice. A notable figure of this period was photographer and educator Shahidul Alam, who founded institutions that elevated Bangladeshi photography to international standards.

Notable institutions that emerged during this period include:

- Drik Picture Library (founded by Shahidul Alam) – an archive and gallery supporting documentary and fine art photography.
- Pathshala South Asian Media Institute – an educational institution providing professional training and international opportunities for emerging photographers.

These institutions provided professional training and international exposure for the next generation of photographers. The establishment of the international photography festival Chobi Mela created a platform for Bangladeshi and international photographers to exchange work and ideas, positioning Bangladesh within global photographic discourse.

=== Digital Era (2000–present) ===
Since the 2000s, the expansion of digital technology has increased the accessibility and adoption of photography. Its use has expanded across news media, online platforms, and social media. Contemporary Bangladeshi photography encompasses multiple genres, including photojournalism, fashion, street, landscape, wildlife, and conceptual photography.

Bangladeshi photographers have achieved international recognition through major awards and exhibitions. The field is now established as both a professional practice and a significant cultural medium.

== Gallery ==
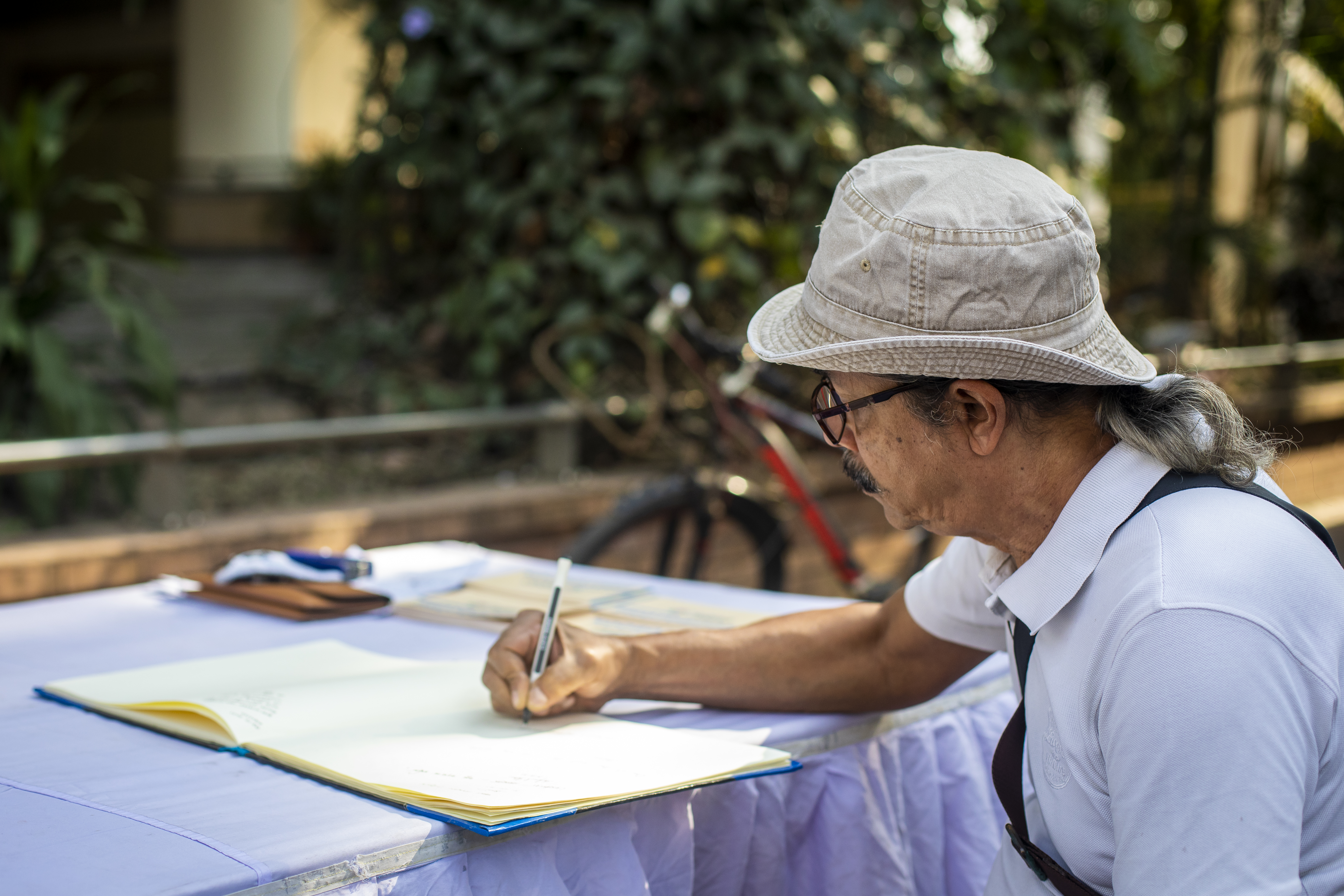
Hasan Saifuddin Chandan

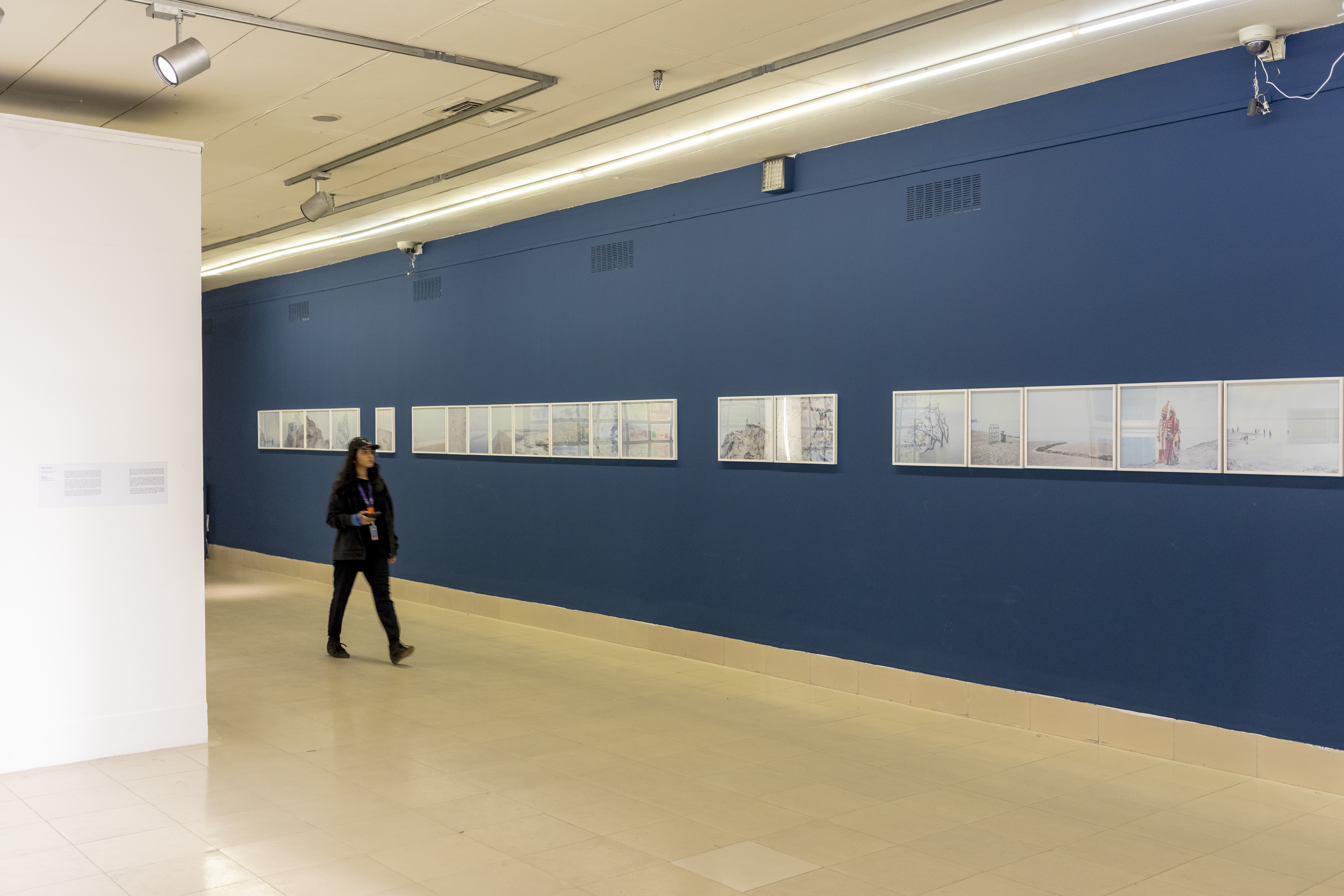
"To Enter the Sky" To Enter the Sky - Protick Sarker

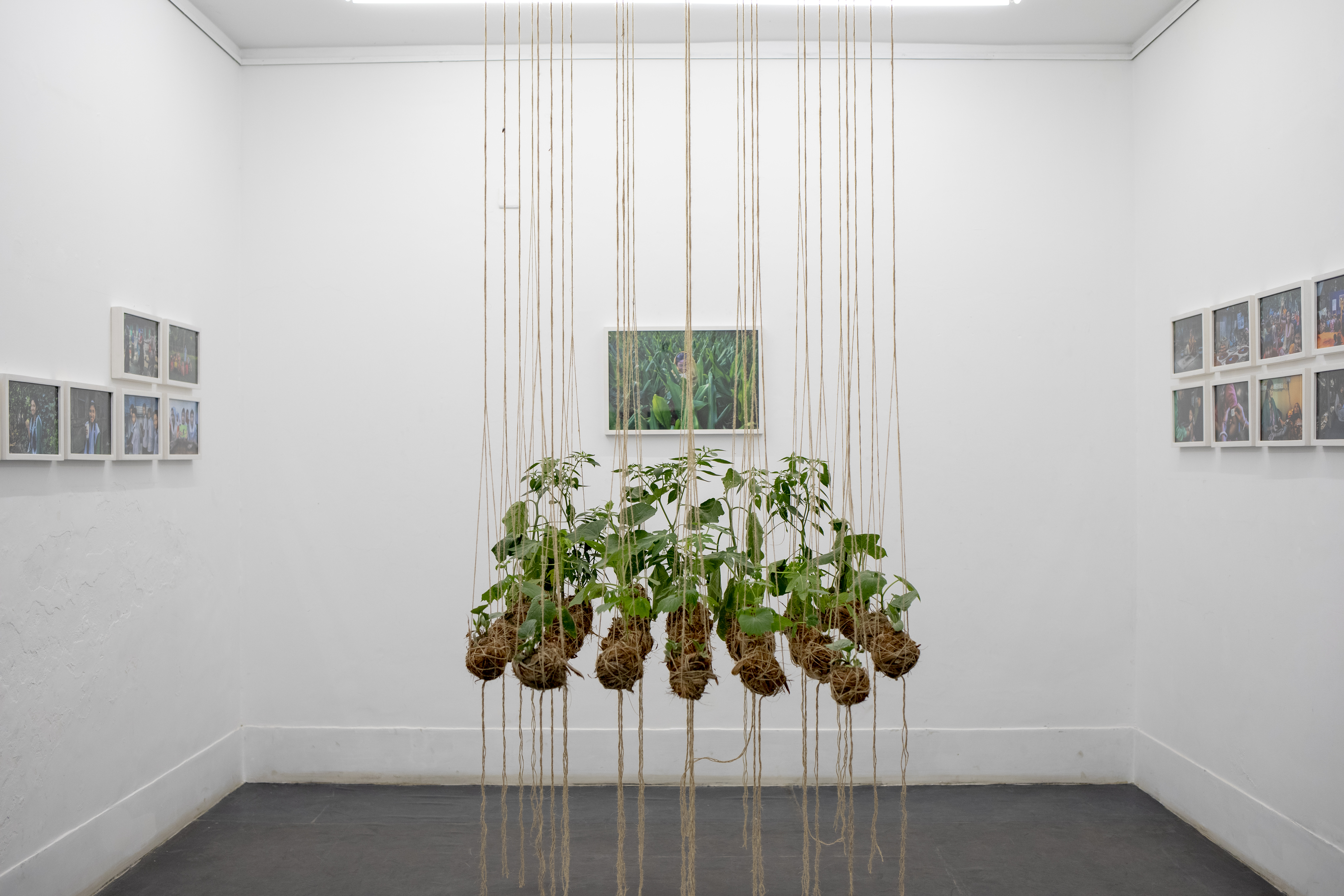
"Nutrition Stories - Collaborative Responsibility for Change"

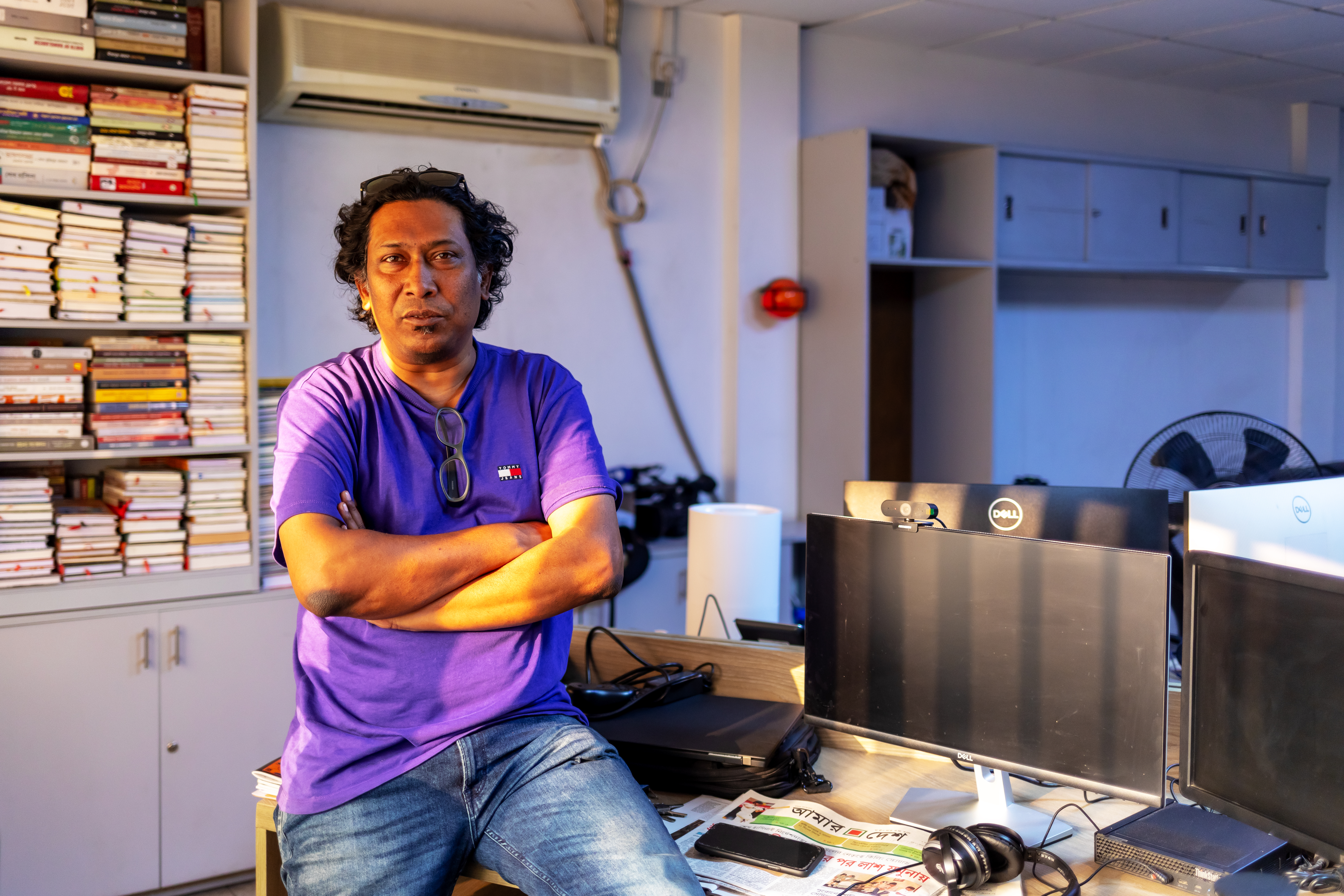
Munir Uz Zaman

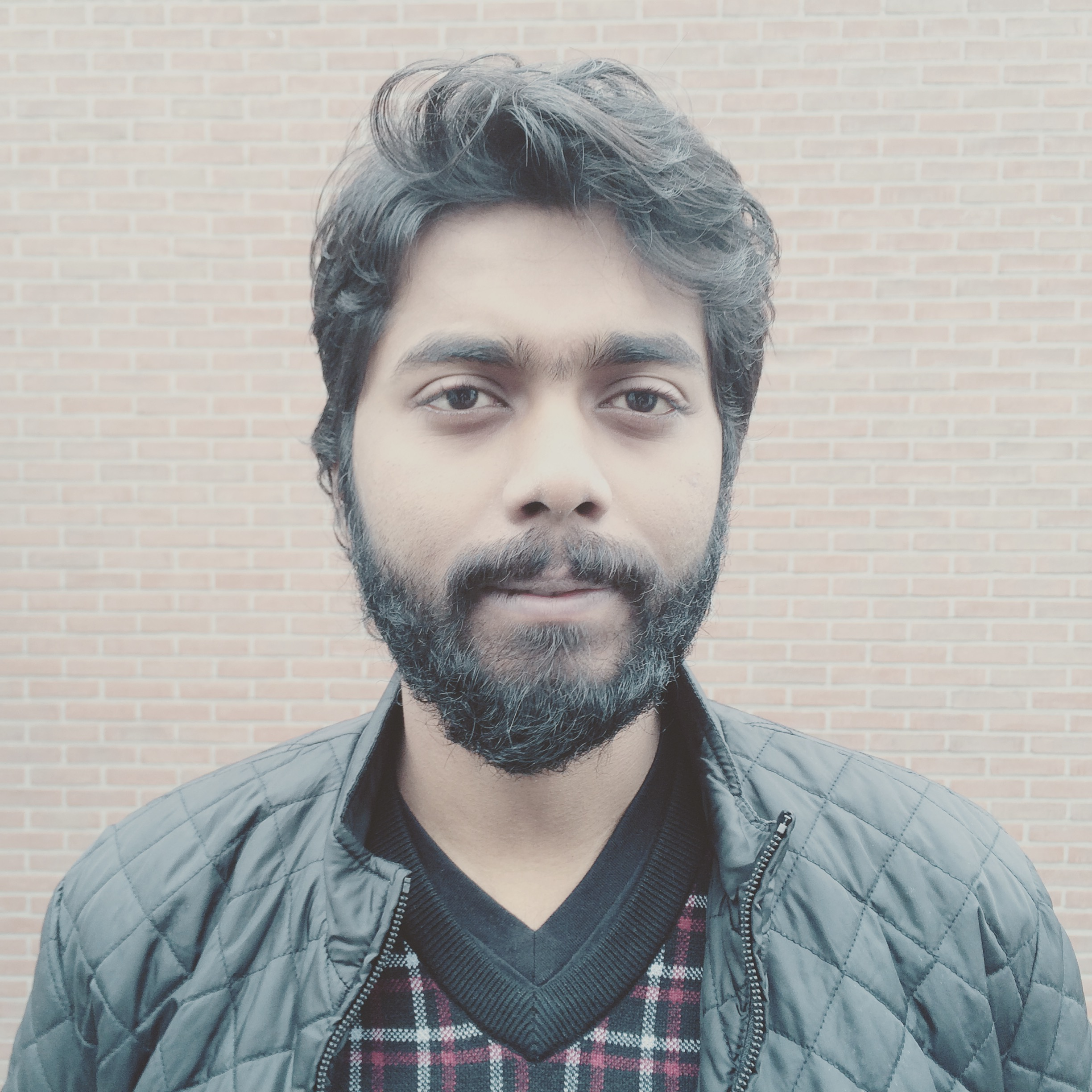
Sarker Protick

Ahmed Rasel

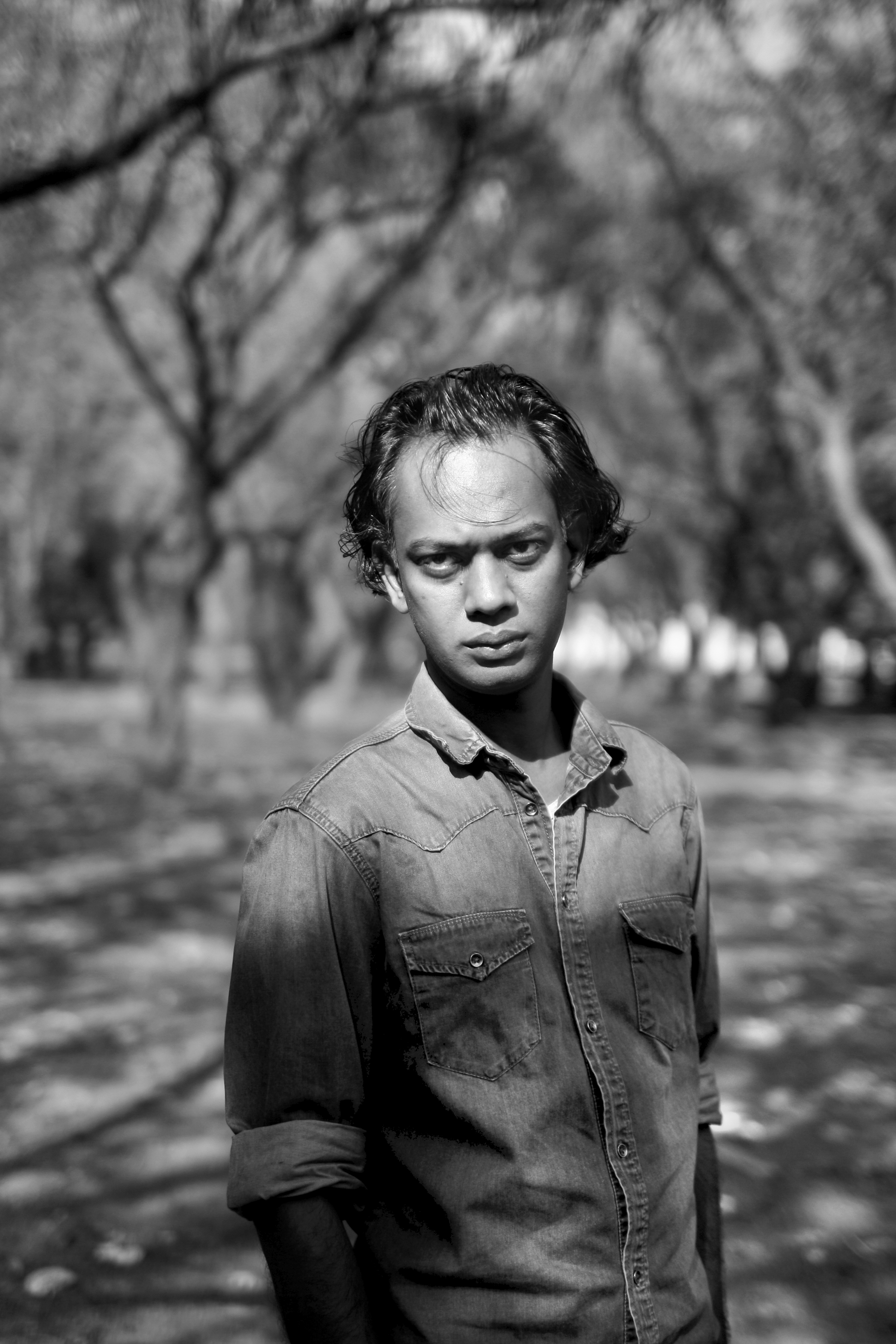
Mohammad Rakibul Hasan

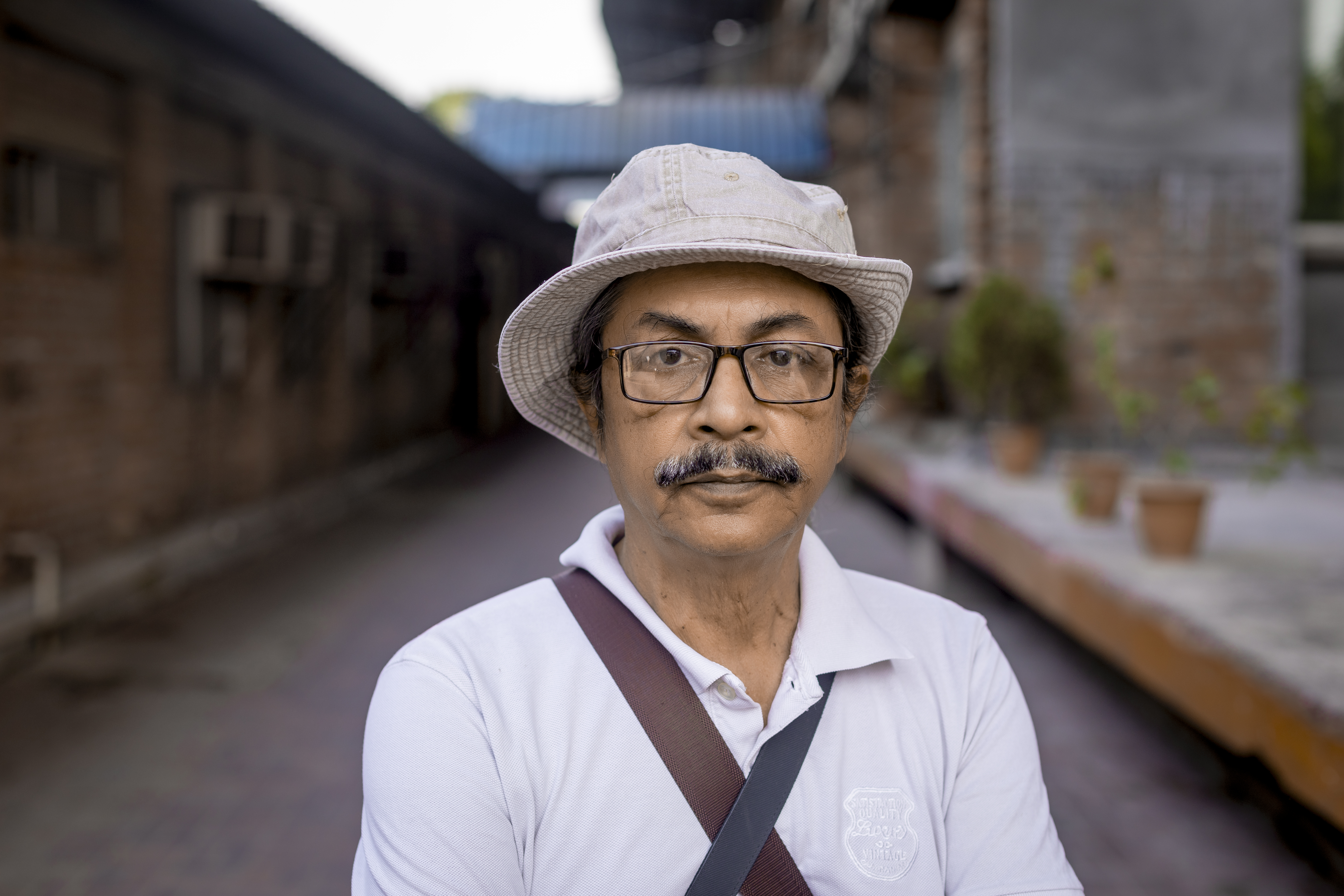
Hasan Saifuddin Chandan

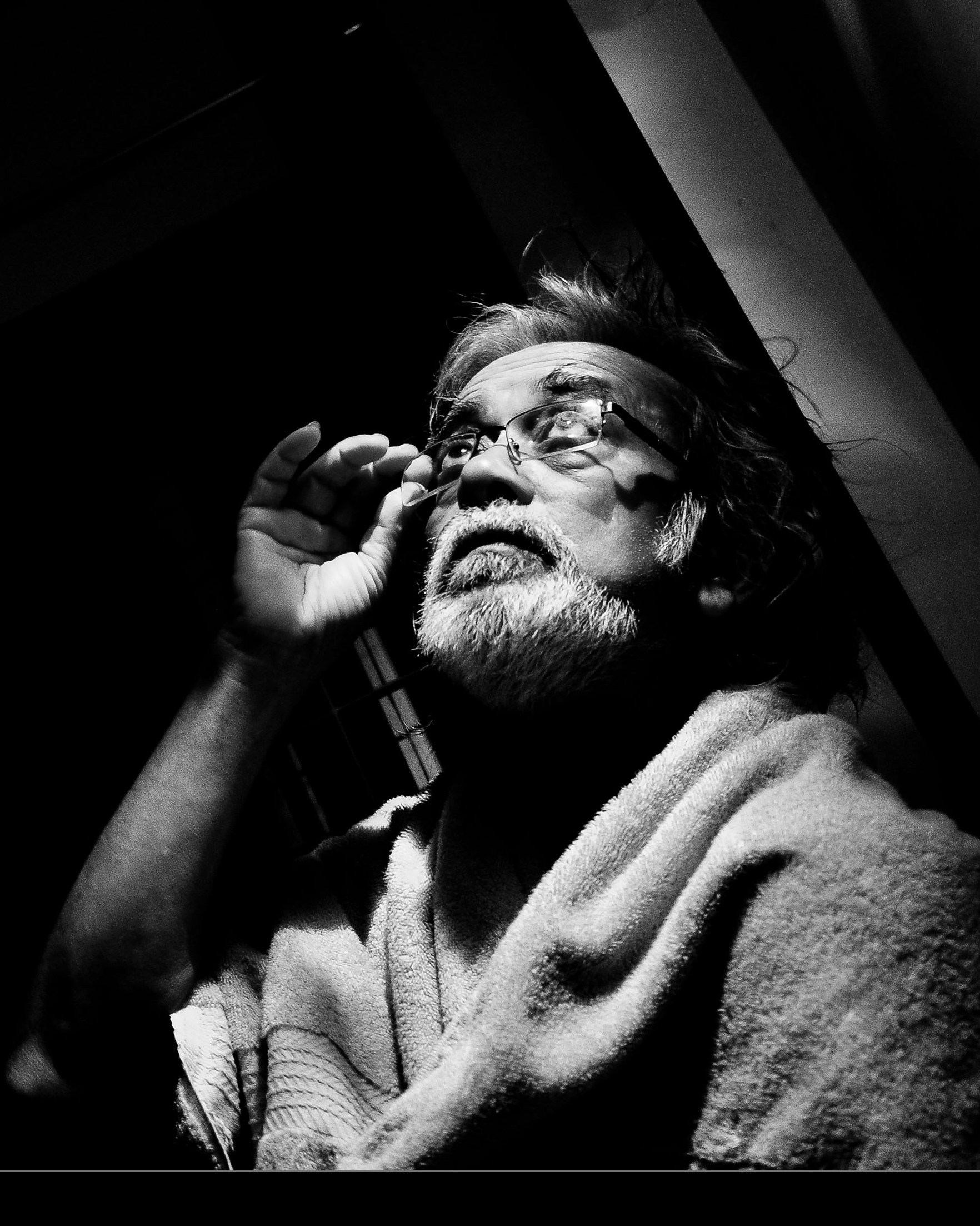
Anwar Hossain
