= Shilpakala Padak =

- Sponsored by: Shilpakala Academy
- Location: Dhaka, Bangladesh
- Country: Bangladesh
- Presented by: Ministry of Cultural Affairs
- First award: 2013
- Website: shilpakalaacademy.org

Shilpakala Padak is an award instituted by Bangladesh Shilpakala Academy (BSA) to recognize ten established artists for their contributions to the fields of Bangladeshi arts, theater, music, dance, instrumental music, folk music and film and others. The academy is the principal state-sponsored national cultural center of Bangladesh as a statutory organization under the Ministry of Cultural Affairs. The award is presented annually by the President of Bangladesh at National Theatre Hall Auditorium of Shilpakala Academy. First awarded in 2013, the Shilpakala Padak award includes ৳100,000, a certificate and an uttorio.

== Winners ==
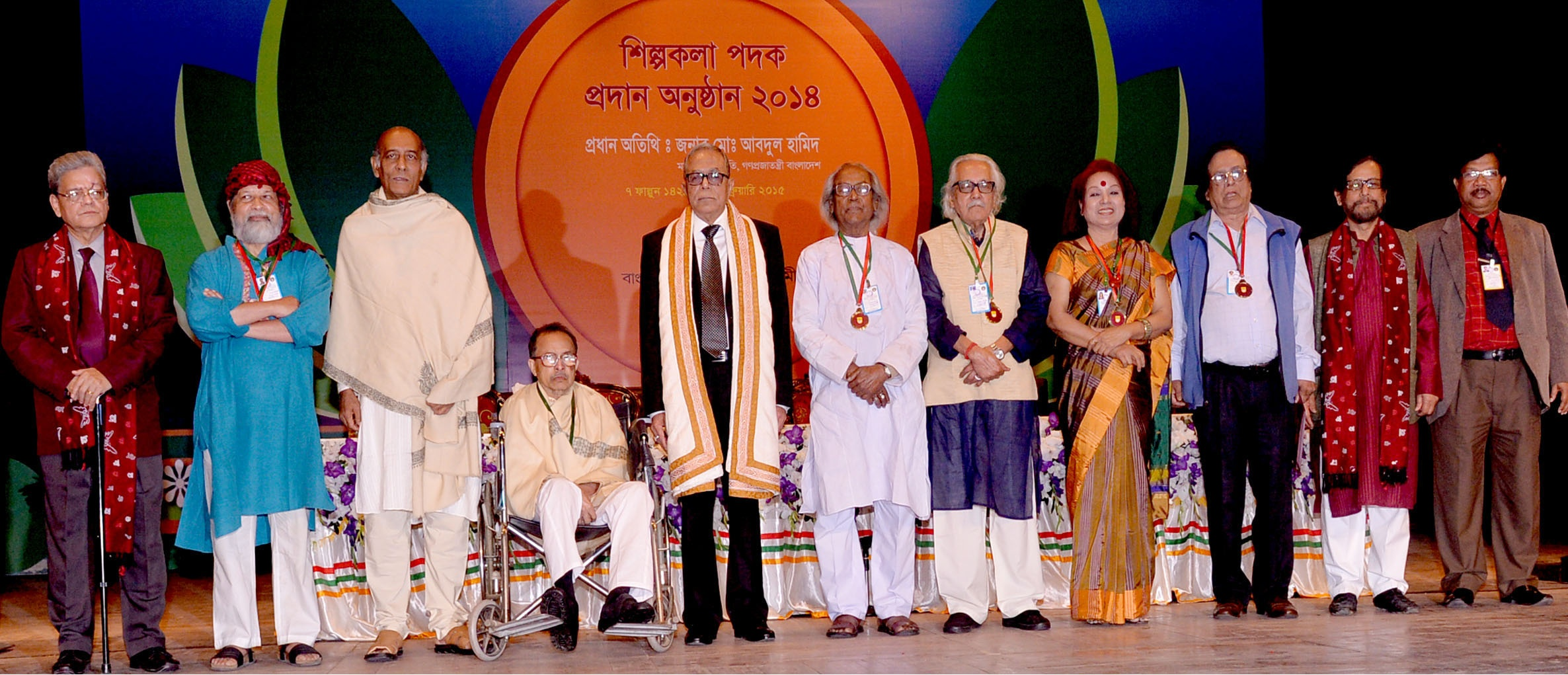
2014 winners

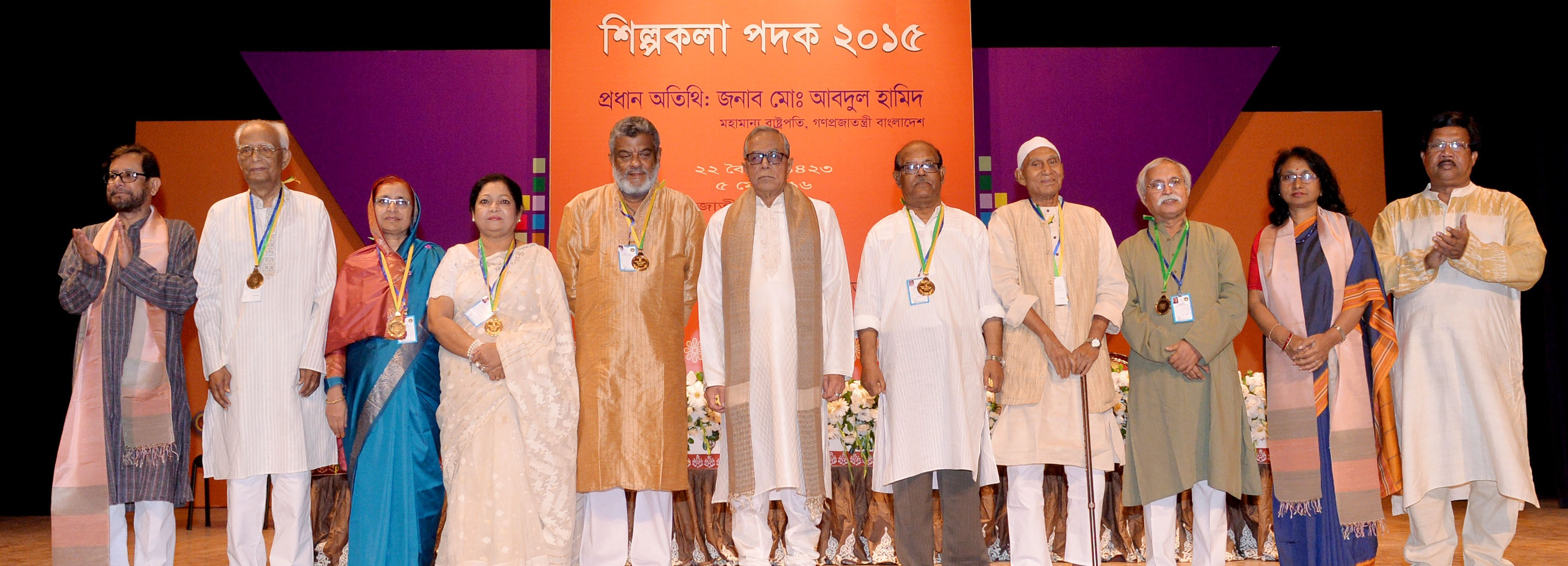
2015 winners

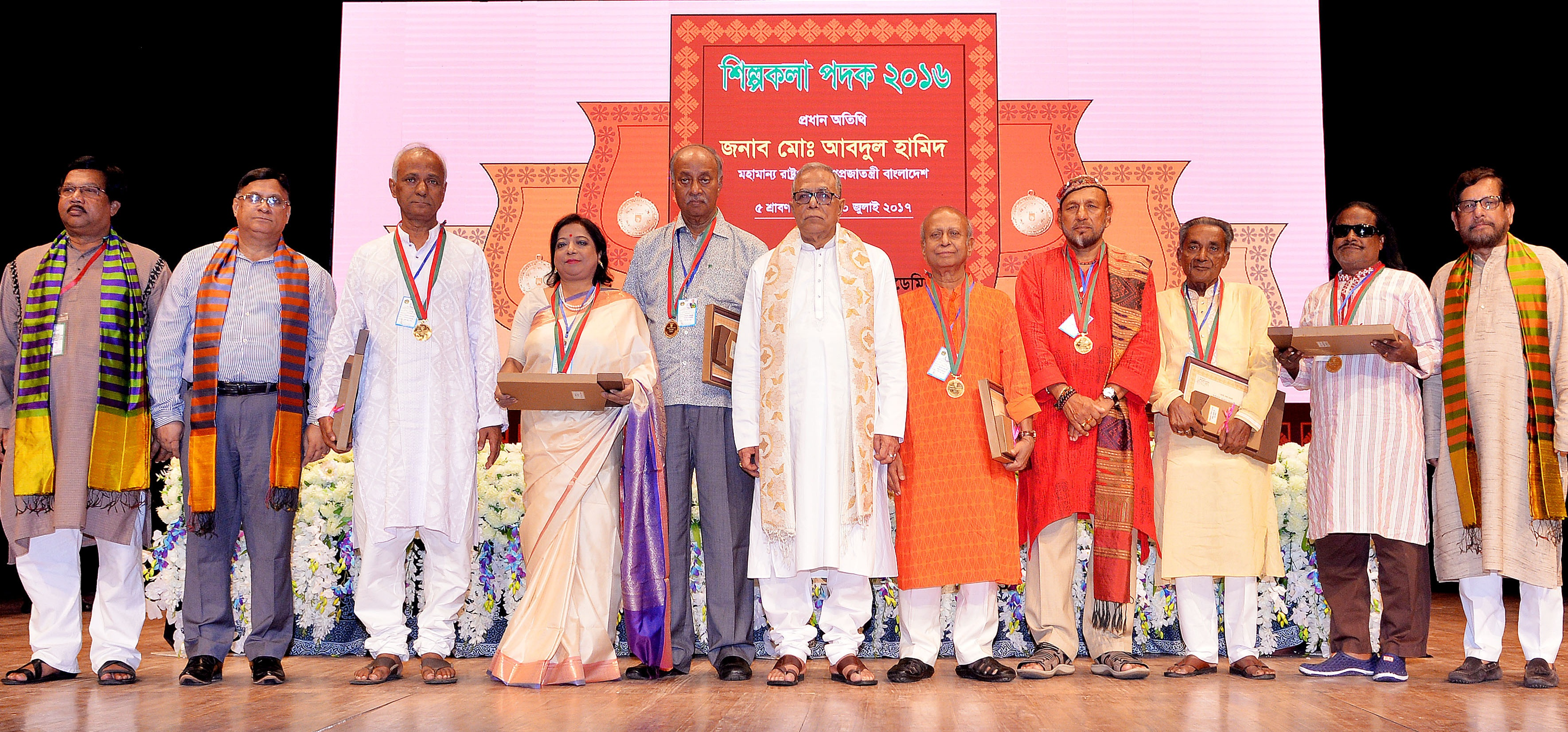
2016 winners

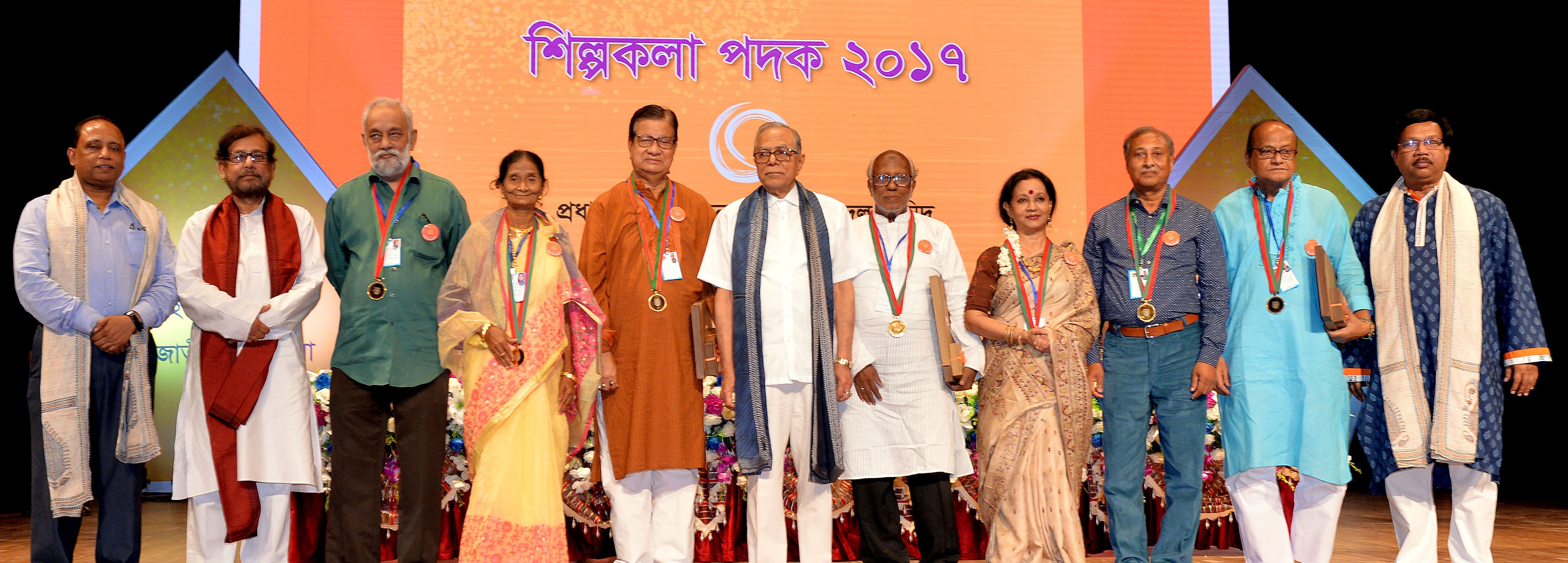
2017 winners

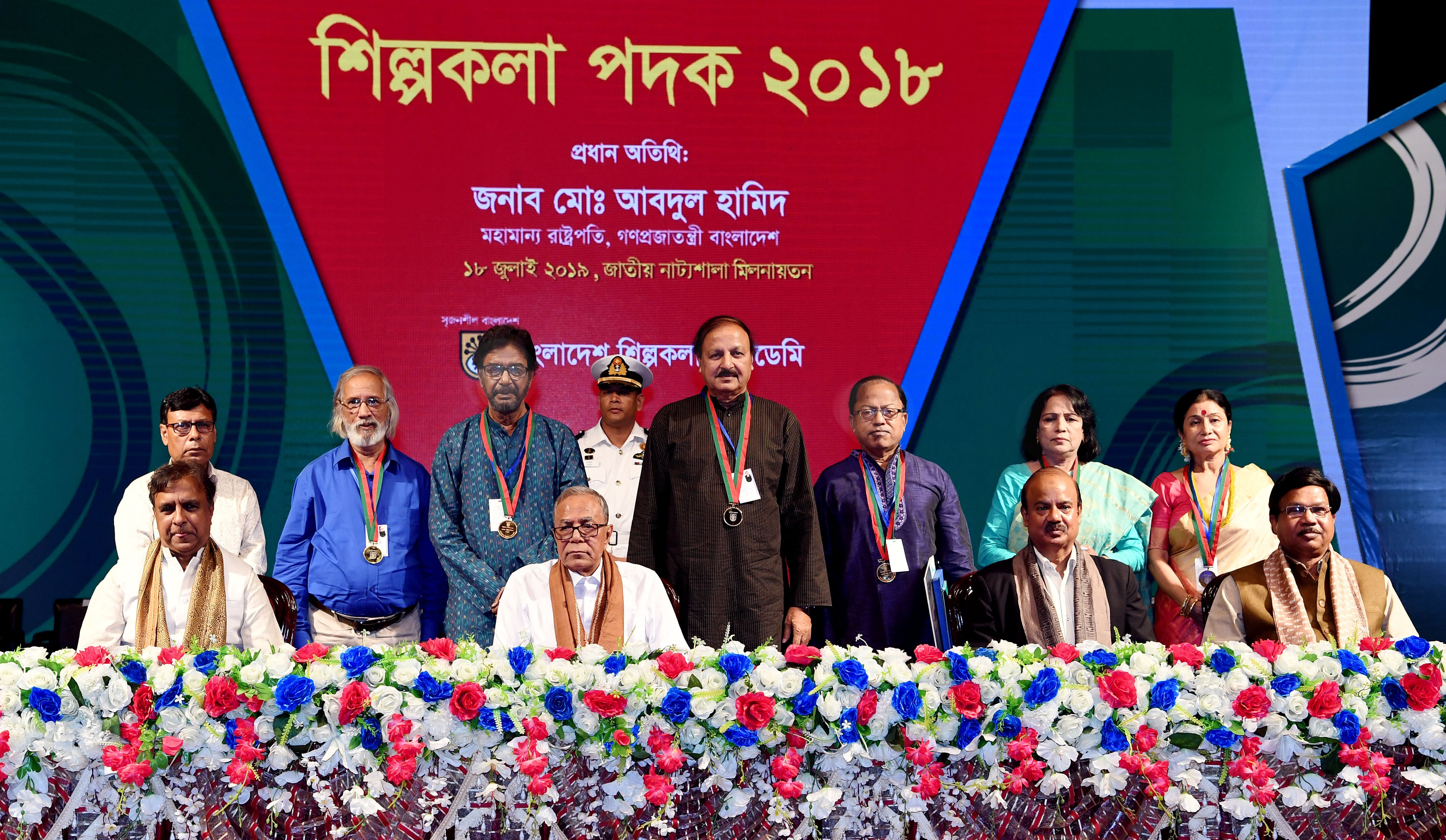
2018 winners

Year	Winners	Area	Ref(s)
2013	Amanul Haque	Dance	
2013	Motiul Haque Khan	Sitar music	
2013	Saidur Rahman Boyati	Folk music	
2013	Samarjit Roy Chowdhury		
2013	Fahmida Khatun		
2013	Manzare Hassin Murad		
2013	Khaled Khan		
2014	Bazlur Rahman Badal	Dance	
2014	Amaresh Roy Chowdhury	Vocal music	
2014	Pandit Madan Gopal Das	Instrumental music	
2014	Syed Abdullah Khalid	Fine arts	
2014	Ashraful Alam	Recitation	
2014	Lucky Enam	Theatre	
2014	Shahidul Alam	Photography	
2015	Saleha Chowdhury	Dance	
2015	Nadira Begum	Traditional music	
2015	Kazi Borhanuddin	Theater	
2015	Shujeo Shyam	Instrumental music	
2015	Mihir Kumar Nandi	Vocal music	
2015	Nikhil Sen	Recitation	
2015	Syed Abul Barak Alvi	Fine arts	
2016	Pabitra Mohan Dey	Instrumental music	
2016	Golam Mostafa Khan	Dance	
2016	Golam Mustafa	Photography	
2016	Kalidas Karmakar	Fine art	
2016	Siraj Uddin Khan Pathan	Folklore	
2016	Syed Jamil Ahmed	Theatre	
2016	Mita Haque	Vocal music	
2017	Alauddin Mia	Instrumental music	
2017	Sharmila Bandyopadhyay	Dance	
2017	Nasir Ali Mamun	Photography	
2017	Chandra Shekhar Dey	Fine art	
2017	Kangalini Sufia	Folklore	
2017	SM Mohsin	Drama	
2017	Mihir Lala	Vocal music	
2018	Sunil Chandra Das	Instrumental music	
2018	Shukla Sarkar	Dance	
2018	Jayanta Chattopadhyay	Recitation	
2018	Alakesh Ghosh	Fine art	
2018	Mina Barua	Folklore	
2018	M Hamid	Drama	
2018	Gaur Gopal Haldar	Vocal music	
2019	Mohammad Moniruzzaman	Instrumental Music (Flute)	
2019	Lubna Marium	Dance	
2019	Hasina Mumtaz	Vocal	
2019	Abdul Mannan	Fine Arts	
2019	Masud Ali Khan	Dramatics	
2019	M A Taher	Photography	
2019	Shamvu Acharaya	Folklore	
2019	Hasan Arif	Recitation	
2019	Anupam Hayat	Film	
2019	Chhayanaut	Creative Cultural Unit	
2020	Shamsur Rahman	Instrumental Music (Shehnai)	
2020	Shibli Mohammad	Dance	
2020	Mahmudur Rahman Benu	Vocal	
2020	Shahid Kabir	Fine Arts	
2020	Malay Bhowmick	Dramatics	
2020	Shafiqul Islam Swapan	Photography	
2020	Shah Alam Sarkar	Folklore	
2020	Dahlia Ahmed	Recitation	
2020	Shameem Akhtar	Film	
2020	Dinajpur Nattya Samity	Creative Cultural Unit	
