= Nasir Ali Mamun =

Bangladeshi photographer (born 1953)

- নাসির আলী মামুন
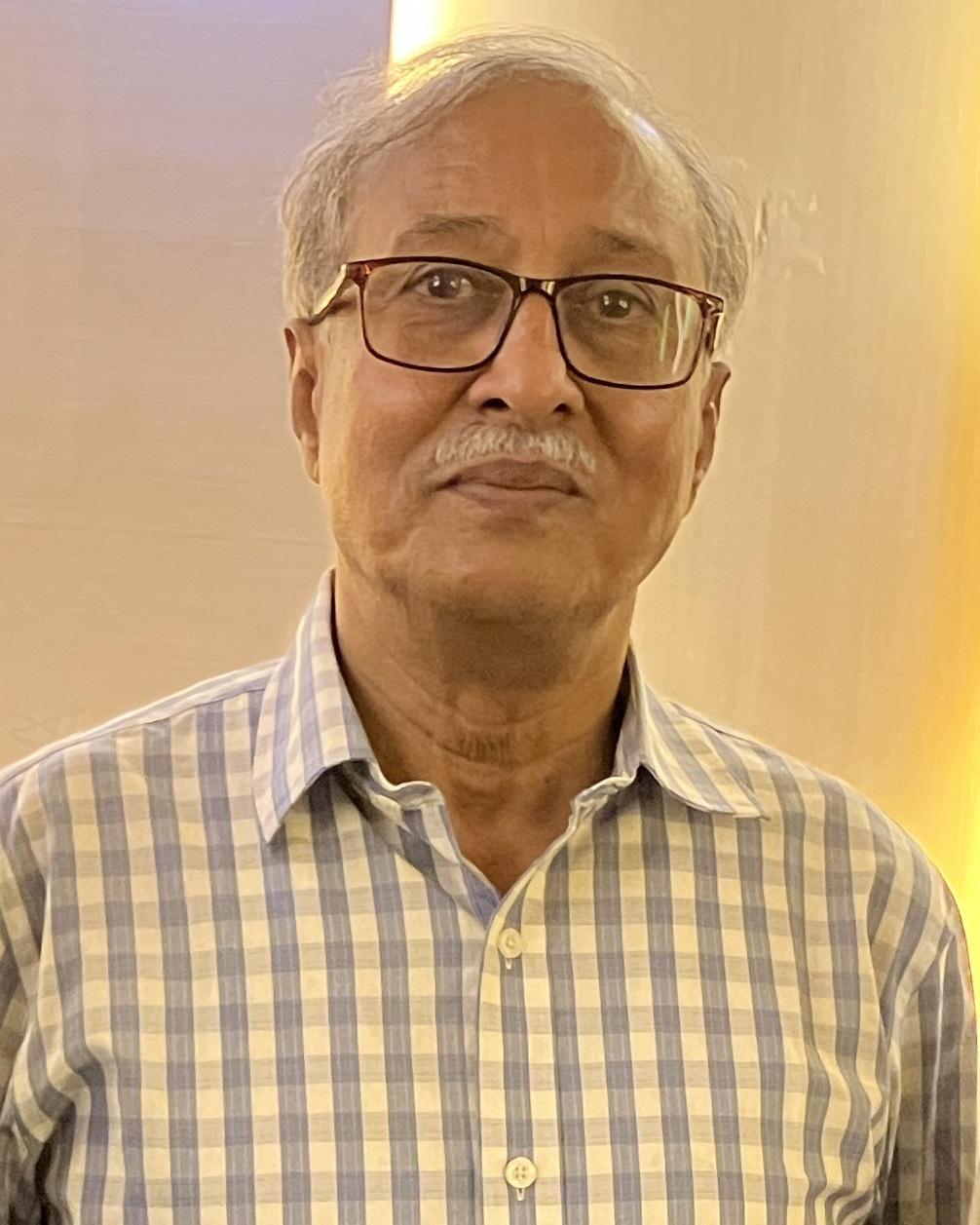
- Nasir Ali Mamun at Wikimedia meetup (February, 2025)
- Born: 1 July 1953 (age 73); Dhaka, East Bengal, Dominion of Pakistan
- Occupations: Portrait Photographer, Writer
- Known for: Portrait photography
- Notable work: Legendary Faces (photography book, 2001); S M Sultan – The Cosmic Journey of a Fugitive (photography book, 2018); Günter Grass: Discovers Dhaka (book, 2001); Shamsur Rahman o Al Mahmud: Tofath o Sakhhat (book, 2009)
- Spouse: Nazmun Nessa (married 1984–present)
- Children: 1
- Awards: Ekushey Padak (2025); Shilpakala Padak (2017); Bangla Academy Fellowship (2022); Chobi Mela Lifetime Achievement Award (2017); M.A. Beg Lifetime Achievement Award (2020); Counter Foto Lifetime Achievement Award (2016)

Nasir Ali Mamun (born 1 July 1953) is a Bangladeshi portrait photographer and author. He has been awarded the Ekushey Padak, the second highest civilian award in Bangladesh. He is popularly known as Camerar Kobi ("The Poet with the Camera"). In 2017, he received the Celebrating Life Lifetime Achievement Award in photography from The Daily Star and Standard Chartered Bank.

In 2016, Mamun released a photo album titled Ananta Jibon Jodi featuring photographs of writer Humayun Ahmed.

== Personal life ==
Nasir Ali Mamun was born on 1 July 1953, in the Moulovi Bazar area of Old Dhaka. His father, Mojibar Rahman Khan, was an advocate at the High Court of Bangladesh, and his mother's name was Rizia Khanom. Mamun is married to Nazmun Nessa. The couple has one son, Nawshad Khan.

Mamun studied in a kindergarten school in Ajimpur, Dhaka. Then he moved to Dhanmondi Government Boyes High School and later admitted to Dhaka College.

== Photography career ==
Mamun started photography from his teenage. At that time he did not have any camera of his own, rather he borrowed cameras from nearby photo-studio. He started portrait photography in 1972. At that time portrait photography genre was not that familiar and nature, landscape and city scapes were more popular genre.

== Awards and recognition ==
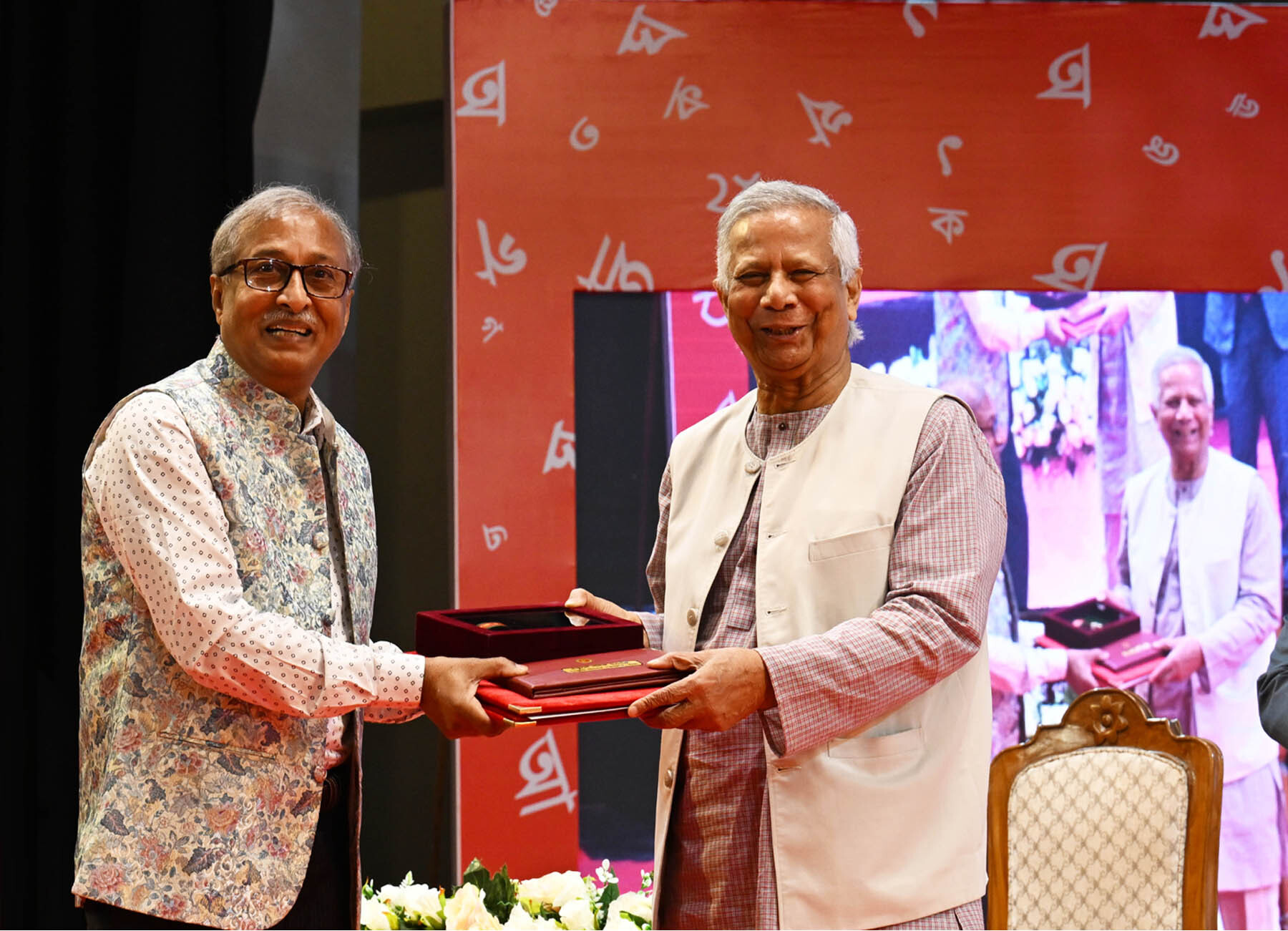
Muhammad Yunus giving Ekushey Padak 2025 to Nasir Ali Mamun.

Over the years, Nasir Ali Mamun has received several awards in recognition of his contributions to photography. Below is a list of some of his most recent and prominent honors:

- Lifetime Achievement Award (2016) – Awarded by Counter Foto
- Chobi Mela Lifetime Achievement Award (2017) – Awarded by Drik
- Shilpakala Padak (2017) – Conferred by the Ministry of Cultural Affairs, Government of Bangladesh
- Celebrating Life Lifetime Achievement Award (2017) – Presented by The Daily Star and Standard Chartered Bank
- M. A. Beg Lifetime Achievement Award (2020) – Presented by Begart Institute of Photography
- Bangla Academy Honorary Fellowship (2022) – Awarded for his contributions to photography
- Ekushey Padak (2025) – The second-highest civilian award in Bangladesh, awarded by the Government of Bangladesh

A feature length documentary titled Mamun: In Praise of Shadows by Makbul Chowdhury was released in 2024. It was produced by Kolakar Productions in Bengali, and features a musical score by Jack Bloor.

== Bibliography ==
- Ahmed Sofar Samay (Era of Ahmed Sofa)
- Charalnama (Story of the Untouchable)
- Mati o Manush (Earth and Human)
