= Golam Mustafa (photographer) =

Bangladeshi photographer (1941–2021)

- গোলাম মুস্তাফা
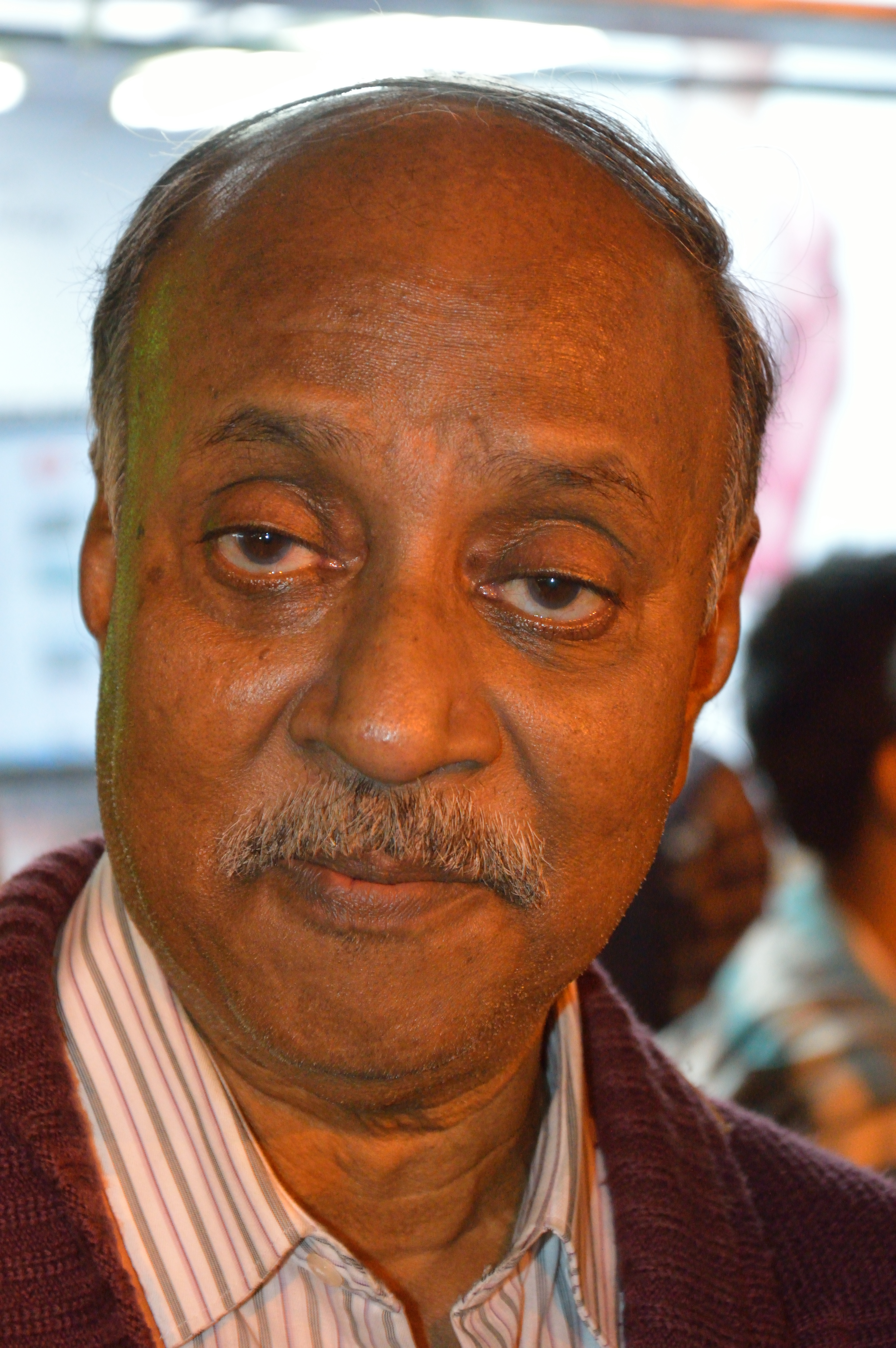
- Mustafa in 2014
- Born: 30 November 1941; Kidderpore, Calcutta, Bengal Presidency, British India
- Died: 9 July 2021 (aged 79); Dhaka, Bangladesh

Golam Mustafa (30 November 1941 – 9 July 2021) was a Bangladeshi photographer. He was awarded Ekushey Padak in 2018 and Shilpakala Padak in 2016 in the photography category by the government of Bangladesh.

== Background ==
Mustafa was born on 30 November 1941 in Kidderpore neighborhood in Calcutta in the then Bengal Presidency, British India. After the 1947 partition of India, his family moved to his paternal grandfather's house in Mirsharai, Chittagong in East Bengal. He then studied in Bar Academy School in Narayanganj and in Jagannath College in Dhaka. Afterward, he got acquainted with the notable photographer Manzoor Alam Beg.

== Career ==
Mustafa was one of the first few photographers of Bangladesh Television (BTV) when it commenced in 1964. He later served as the director of photography in BTV and retired in 1998. BTV initially began its broadcasting operations with three newly appointed photographers, Mustafa being one of them; he served the national broadcaster for more than three decades until his retirement. In photography education, Mustafa served as a guest lecturer in the Department of Architecture at North South University, teaching courses on architectural photography to undergraduate students.

Mustafa was the Head of the Standing Council of Bangladesh Photographic Society (BPS). He was also the member of the editorial board of the magazine named Photography.

== Awards ==
- Beauty Boarding Addabaj Sammanana
