= Kazi Zinat Hoque =

Bangladeshi judge

Justice of the High Court Division of Bangladesh

Personal details
- Profession: Judge

Kazi Zinat Hoque is a Judge on the High Court Division of Bangladesh Supreme Court.

== Early life ==
Hoque was born to Justice Kazi Ebadul Haque and Dr. Sharifa Khatun on 14 October 1974. Hoque completed her bachelor's degree and Masters in law from the University of Dhaka. She completed her post graduate studies from London South Bank University.

== Career ==
Hoque started working as an advocate on the District Court on 6 August 1997.

On 18 June 2000, Hoque became an advocate in the High Court Division of the Bangladesh Supreme Court.

Hoque started her legal practice in the Appellate Division of the Bangladesh Supreme Court on 20 December 2015.

On 21 October 2019, Hoque was appointed a temporary Judge in the High Court Division of Bangladesh Supreme Court.

On 10 January 2021, Hoque and Justice Zubayer Rahman Chowdhury issued an order upheld the law that bans women from becoming Muslim marriage registrars.

Hoque became a permanent Judge of the High Court Division on 19 October 2021. She was a member of a committee formed by the Supreme Court to investigate sexual harassments in November 2021.
