= Bazlur Rahman Badal =

Bangladeshi dancer

- বজলুর রহমান বাদল
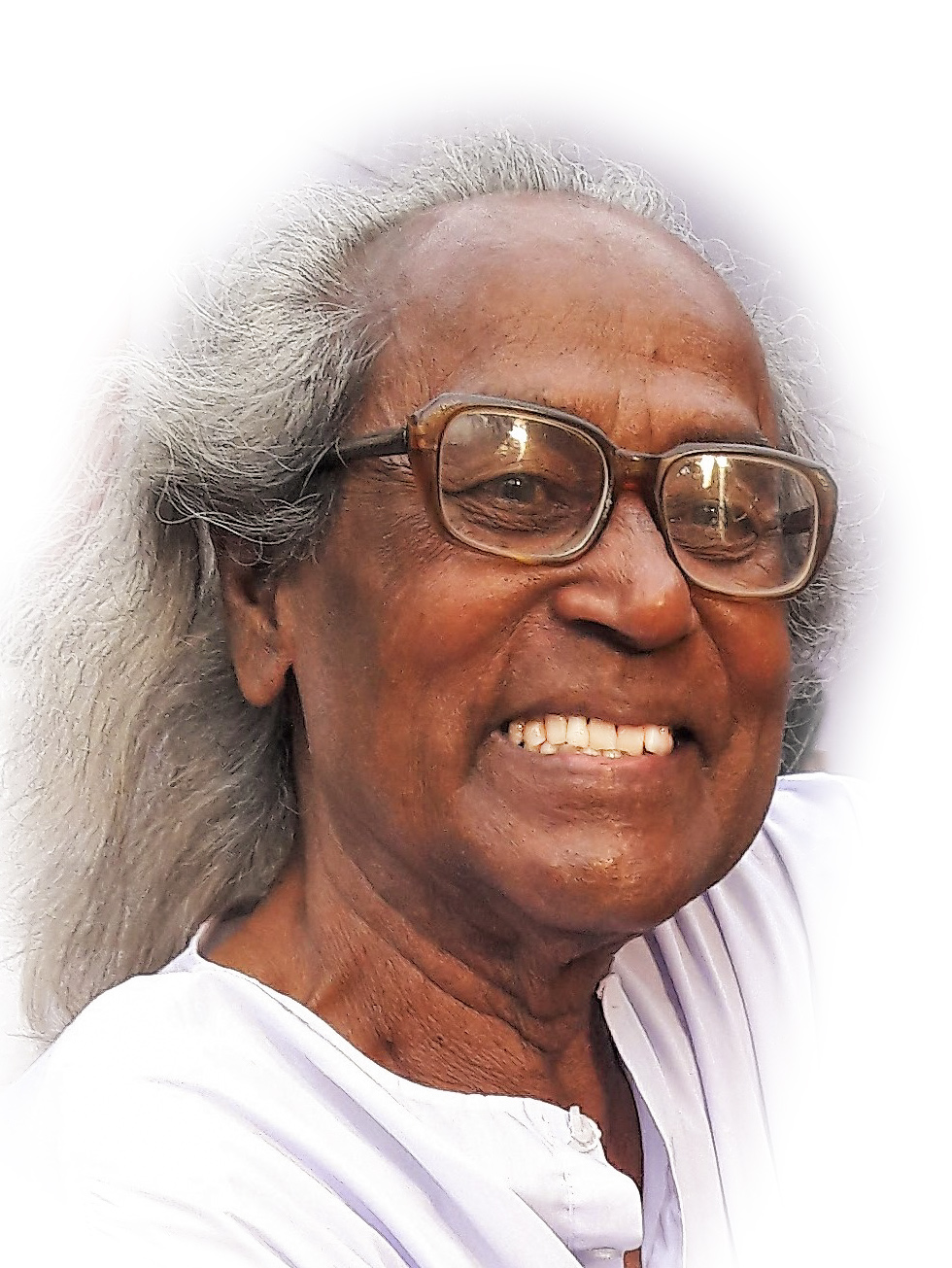
- Badal at Rajshahi College (2017)
- Born: 1921/1922; Jalpaiguri district, Bengal Presidency, British India
- Died: 19 August 2018 (aged 96–97); Rajshahi, Bangladesh
- Occupation: Dancer
- Awards: Independence Day Award (2017)

Bazlur Rahman Badal (1921/1922 – 19 August 2018) was a Bangladeshi dancer. He was awarded Shilpakala Padak in 2014 and Independence Day Award in 2017 in the dance category by the Government of Bangladesh.

== Career ==
After the partition of India in 1947, Badal migrated to Rangpur and eventually to Rajshahi where he began his dance training under the guidance of his first teacher, known as Dukhu Master. He provided dance lessons to the students in Rajshahi's Shilpakala Academy.

Badal specialized in folk dance. He became notable for his dance composition of the poem Bidrohi of Kazi Nazrul Islam. He served as the president of Bangladesh Nritya Shilpi Sangstha (Rajshahi).
