= Manzare Hassin Murad =

Bangladeshi documentary filmmaker

- মানজারে হাসীন মুরাদ
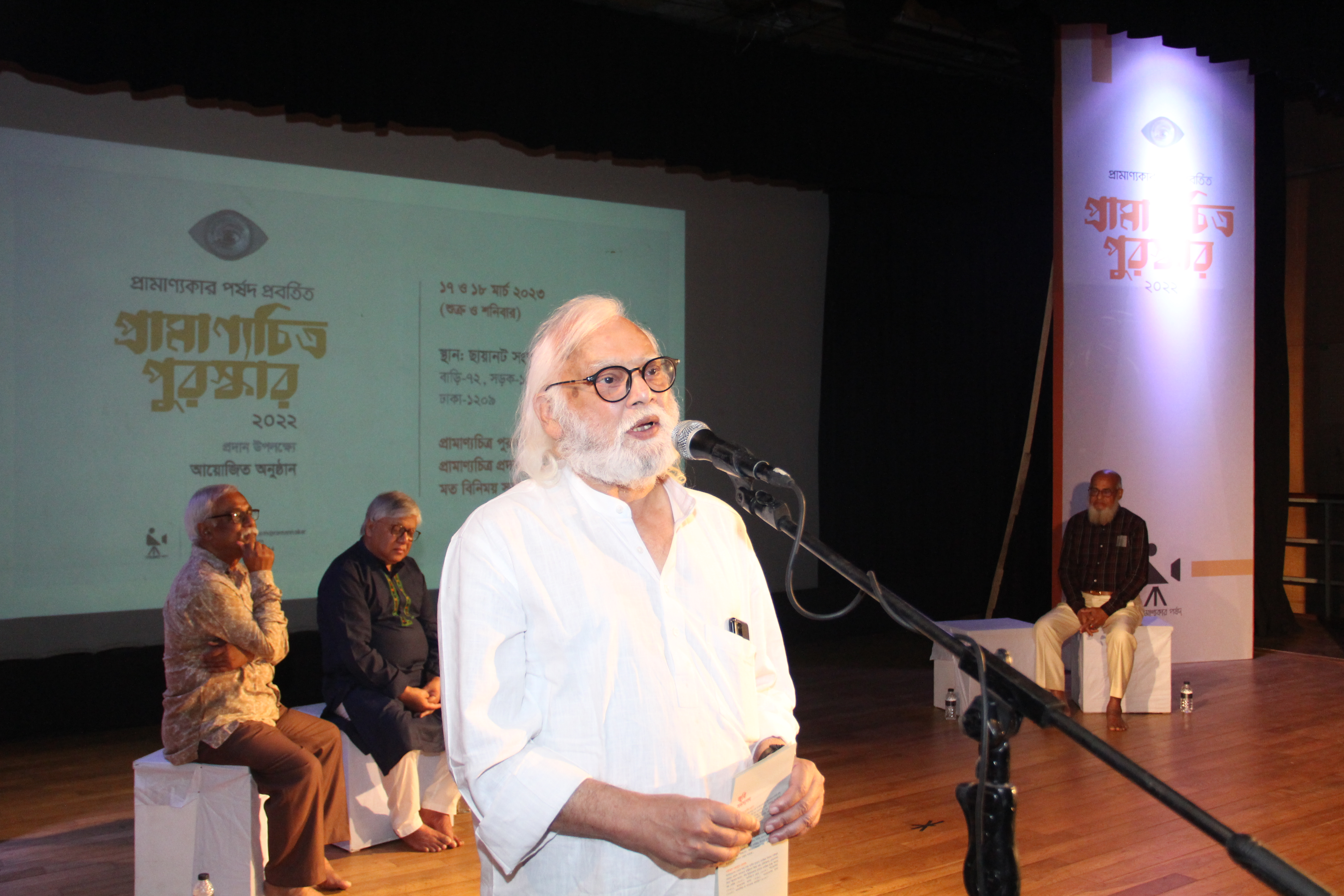
- Murad at the Documentary Award program 2022 by Pramannakar Parshad
- Born: October 21, 1954 (age 71); Rangpur
- Education: Film and TV School of the Academy of Performing Arts in Prague (FAMU), Czechoslovakia
- Occupation: Documentary Filmmaker
- Organization(s): Federation of Film Societies of Bangladesh, Bangladesh Short Film Forum, Pramannakar Parshad
- Notable work: Rokeya, Our Boys, Aparajita, 71, Still Now
- Spouse: Ruchira Tabassum Naved
- Father: Abdul Haque Khondker
- Family: Prof. Khondker Manzare Shamim
- Awards: Shilpakala Padak
- Website: pramannokar.org

Manzare Hassin Murad is a Bangladeshi documentary filmmaker, independent producer, activist, and educator. He is known for his contributions to Bangladesh's documentary movement and service as President of the Federation of Film Societies of Bangladesh. His documentary works, often focusing on themes of gender, justice, and socio-political issues in Bangladesh, include the documentaries Aparajita, Our Boys, Rokeya, and 71, Still Now. In 2013, Bangladesh Government awarded him the Shilpakala Padak.

== Early life and family ==
Manzare Hassin Murad was born in 1954 in Rangpur. His father, Abdul Haque Khondker, was a teacher at Rangpur Carmichael College. The family's ancestral home was in Cooch Behar, West Bengal, and they moved to East Bengal in 1948.

In 1963, Murad moved to Dhaka when his father joined the East Pakistan Scientific Research Center (now BCSIR). He attended West End School near Lalbagh before becoming a student in the first batch of Dhanmondi Boys High School in 1964.

== Education ==
Murad initially admitted to Notre Dame College for Higher Secondary education, but later attended Dhaka College, where he became actively involved in student politics. He eventually enrolled in the Department of Economics at the University of Dhaka in late 1972. His interest in cinema grew through the Bangladesh Film Society. After the independence of Bangladesh, he joined Chhayanaut as a student. In 1976, he completed the 2nd Film Appreciation course conducted by Satish Bahadur, then head of the Film Appreciation department at the Film and Television Institute of India (FTII). In 1988, he graduated from the internationally renowned film school, the Film and TV School of the Academy of Performing Arts in Prague (FAMU), Czechoslovakia (now Czech Republic).

== Career ==
Murad joined the Bangladesh Film Society Movement in 1972, and became involved in the country's Alternative Film Movement, joining Bangladesh Short Film Forum (BSFF) in 1986 as a founding member. After returning from Prague, he established himself as an independent documentary filmmaker. He made his first film, One Day in Krishnanagar, in 1993. His subsequent body of work has been screened widely in Bangladesh and at international film festivals.

=== Film activism and leadership ===
Murad has been a highly active figure in promoting the independent documentary film movement and film culture in Bangladesh. He served as the President of Bangladesh Short Film Forum in 1990 and 2002. In 2003, he with other notable documentary filmmakers founded Bangladesh Documentary Council. Council has supported many of Murad’s initiatives and has recognized his contributions to ethical documentary practices and creative innovation.

In 2010, Manzare Hasin Murad was appointed acting president of the Federation of Film Societies of Bangladesh (FFSB), succeeding Badal Rahman after his death. Murad committed to continuing Rahman's unfinished initiatives, including the revisions to the Film Society Regulation Act, the proposal for a National Film Policy, and the establishment of a National Film Institute, which led to the foundation of Bangladesh Cinema & Television Institute (BCTI) later. He also advocated for state-run institutions such as the Bangladesh Shilpakala Academy and Bangladesh Film Archive.

=== Mentorship and consultancy ===
Murad dedicated time to fostering the next generation of documentary filmmakers. As the audio-visual consultant for Steps Towards Development, a prominent NGO in Bangladesh, he guided the production of several important documentaries. This work is credited with shaping the subsequent history of documentary film in Bangladesh by producing promising new filmmakers.

=== Academic roles ===
Murad has also contributed significantly to film education in Bangladesh. In October 2008, Murad was appointed chair of the Department of Film and Media at Stamford University Bangladesh. He later joined the Bangladesh Cinema & Television Institute (BCTI), the first state-run film school, as a Course Director.

=== Current initiatives ===
In 2022, Manzare Hassin Murad has founded Pramannakar Parshad and Documentary School of Bangladesh (DSB), the two initiative focused on the education and development of documentary filmmaking in the country. Pramannakar Parshad has introduced dedicated screening and award programs for documentary and Documentary School of Bangladesh (DSB) runs educational courses in Bangladesh to encourage new generation into documentary filmmaking.

== Awards and recognition ==
In 2013, Murad received the Shilpakala Padak in the category of film. The award was presented by the President of Bangladesh, Abdul Hamid.

In 2014, Murad received the Golden Jubilee Commemorative Award for his significant contributions to the film society movement in Bangladesh.

In October 2019, he played a central role in the day-long event "Documenting Me" held at EMK Center in Dhaka, which featured a self-reflective photography exhibition and a masterclass led by Murad, highlighting his contributions to ethical and independent documentary practice.

== Filmography ==
- One Day in Krishnanagar (1993)
- Rokeya (1996)
- Charushilpe Muktijhuddho (1997)
- Our Boys (2000)
- Ovijatree (2003)
- Aparajita (2005)
- 71, still now (2016)
