= Anupam Hayat =

Bangladeshi film critic

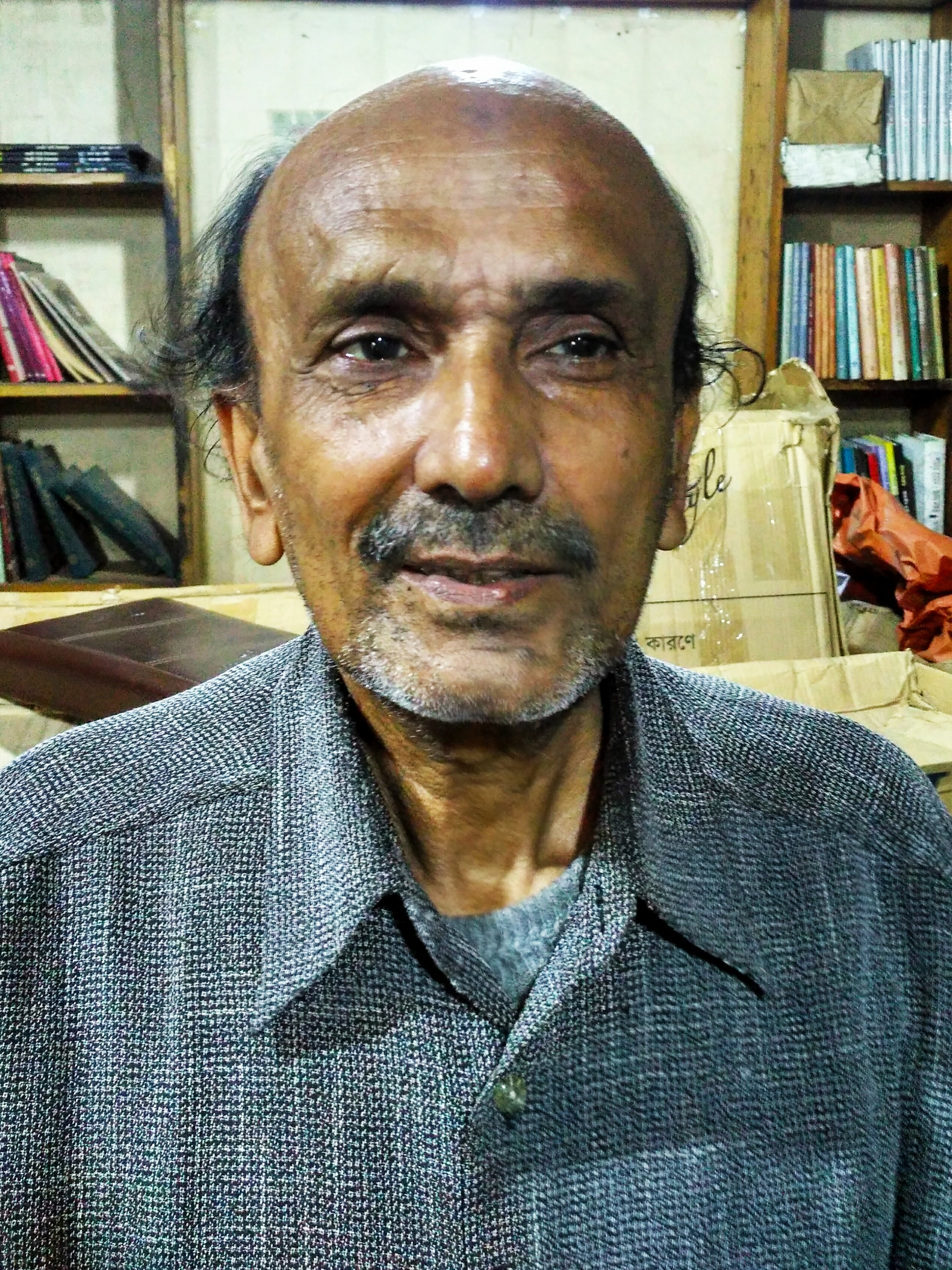
- Hayat at Aziz Super Market, Shahbagh, Dhaka (2019)
- Education: University of Dhaka

Anupam Hayat is a Bangladeshi author and film critic. The author of the first textbook on film in Bangladesh titled Cholochitra Bidya, published by Bangladesh Film Study Centre in 2004, Hayat is also credited with another textbook on cinema as an art titled Chalachitra Kala, published by University Grants Commission in 2007.

== Early life ==
Hayat became interested in writing film criticism by reading articles by late film director Alamgir Kabir in the late 1960s. While he was a student of Journalism and Mass Communication at University of Dhaka, he took the course "Mass communication and motion picture". But, he enriched his writing skill, contributing to various newspapers and magazines on film.

== Publications ==
Hayat's book on the country's film history Bangladesher Chalochitrer Etihash (1896-1987), published by the Bangladesh Film Development Corporation, features a chronological history of movies, film activists, and historical incidents took place during the period with pictures.

Other books by Hayat such as Nazrul-er Chalochitra O Natok, Zahir Raihan-er Cholochitrer Patobhumi, Bishoy O Boishistha, Muktijuddha Bishoyok Cholochitra, Rabindranath O Cholochitra and Fateh Lohani-er Jiboni have nourished film apprentices and connoisseurs for the past three decades.

== Awards ==
- As recognition of his contribution in film criticism, Anupam Hayat was awarded Fazlul Haq Memorial Award in 2011.
- Nazrul Award (2012) for his significant contribution to the research and practice of Kazi Nazrul Islam's literature.
- Shilpakala Padak in 2019 (Film).

== Works ==
Hayat has a commendable contribution in establishing Film Study Centre in 1994 and in 2004 he joined as a teacher at the Film and Media Study Department of Stamford University. Finding scarcity in texts on film study in Bangladesh, he initiated to write texts on film study, Anupam Hayat said.
