= Pearu Sardar =

- Born: Pearu; February 7, 1911; Hussaini Dalan, Dhaka
- Died: October 5, 1961 (aged 50)
- Spouse: Hussain Banu

Pearu Sardar (1911–1961) was an area leader of Dhaka, Pakistan. At the beginning of the 20th century, the area leader of Dhaka was known as Sardar; he was known for his involvement in the Language Movement of 1952. The first Shaheed Minar to commemorate the Language Martyrs of February 21, 1952, was built immediately after the events of that day, with his sponsorship.

== Role in 1952 ==
According to Dr. Sayeed Haider, a main planner and the designer of the first Shaheed Minar, the decision to build it was first made by the students of Dhaka Medical College. The planning started at midnight on February 22, 1952, and work started the next day. It was sponsored by Sardar, one of the old Dhaka panchayet sardars. Although a curfew was in place, students started building the Minar on the afternoon of February 23 and worked through the night to finish it by dawn. A handwritten paper was attached to the Minar with "Shaheed Smritistombho" written on it. It was demolished within a few days by the police and Pakistani Army.

== Awards ==
In 2015, the government of Bangladesh announced the nominees for the Ekushey Padak Award, one of the country's highest civilian awards. Sardar received the award posthumously in recognition for his role during the language movement.
