= Mihir Kumar Nandi =

Bangladeshi singer (1945–2017)

- Born: 14 December 1945; Keuchia, Satkania, Chittagong, Bengal Presidency, British India
- Died: 6 May 2017 (aged 71); Chittagong, Bangladesh
- Parents: Fanindra Lal Nandi (father); Mallika Rani Nandi (mother)

Mihir Kumar Nandi (14 December 1945 – 6 May 2017) was a Bangladeshi Rabindra Sangeet singer and classical vocalist. He was a singer at the Swadhin Bangla Betar Kendra during the 1971 Liberation War. In 2015, he was awarded Shilpakala Padak in the vocal music category by the Government of Bangladesh.

== Early life ==
Nandi was born in Chittagong to Fanindra Lal Nandi and Mallika Rani Nandi. He got his early music lessons from his father. Later he was trained by Waheedul Haq, Shailada Ranjan Majumder, Nirod Baran Barua, Ashok Dasgupta, Soumitra Lal Dasgupta and Aditya Narayan Das.

== Career ==
In 1964, Nandi's musical career began by enlisting as a singer with Chittagong Betar.

Nandi was an artist of special class at Bangladesh Betar and Bangladesh Television. He founded Ananda Dhwani, a music organization. He served as the vice-president of Bangladesh Udichi Shilpigoshthi and Rabindra Sangeet Sommilon Parishad. He was a part-time lecturer at the Department of Music of the University of Chittagong.

Nandi died on 6 May 2017 at Chittagong Medical College Hospital (CMCH). He was cremated at Bolua Dighir Par.
