= Pabitra Mohan Dey =

Pabitra Mohan Dey পবিত্র মোহন দে
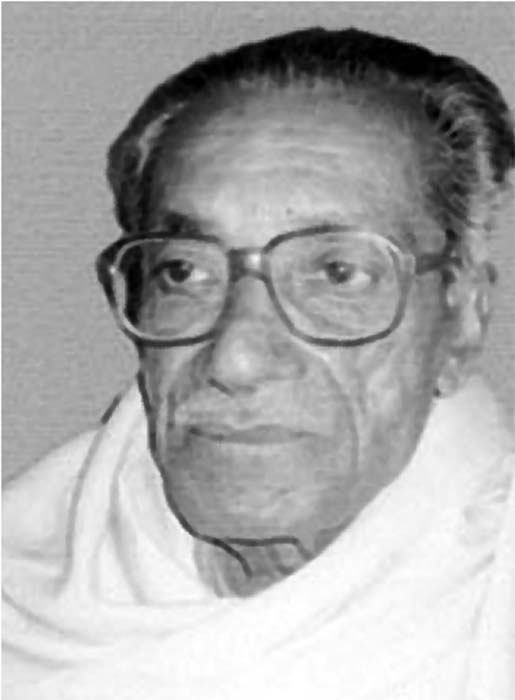

Background information
- Born: 1 May 1937 (age 88); Mymensingh, Bengal Province, British India
- Origin: Mymensingh
- Instrument: Tabla

Pabitra Mohan Dey (born 1 May 1937) is a Bangladeshi tabla (a percussion instrument in the form of a drum) player. He was awarded 2016 Shilpakala Padak by the Government of Bangladesh for his contribution to instrumental music and won the Independence Award in 2023 for his contribution to the field of cultural.

== Early life and career ==
Dey was born on 1 May 1937 in Chukaitola, Akua, Mymensingh. He took tabla lessons from his elder brother Mithun Dey.

Dey is serving as a tabla teacher at Bangladesh Agricultural University (BAU) Sangeet Bidhalaya.

== Awards ==
- "Rabindra Padak"" by Jatiya Rabindra Sangeet Sammilan Parishad (2009)
- Shilpakala Padak by Bangladesh Shilpakala Academy (2016)
