= Golam Mostafa Khan =

Bangladeshi dance artist (1940–2022)

- গোলাম মোস্তফা খান
- Born: c. 1940
- Died: 13 November 2022 (aged 82); Dhaka, Bangladesh
- Awards: Full list

Golam Mostafa Khan (c. 1940 – 13 November 2022) was a Bangladeshi dance artist. He was awarded Ekushey Padak in 2020 and Shilpakala Padak in 2016 by the Government of Bangladesh.

Khan died in Dhaka on 13 November 2022, at the age of 82.

== Awards ==
- Shilpakala Padak (2016)
- Ekushey Padak (2020)
