= Nadira Begum =

Bangladeshi folk singer (died 2023)

Nadira Begum নাদিরা বেগম
- Died: 6 November 2023 Dhaka, Bangladesh
- Genres: Bhawaiya

Nadira Begum (died 6 November 2023) was a Bangladeshi folk singer. She was awarded Shilpakala Padak by the Government of Bangladesh in 2015. She was notable for songs like Kolo Kolo Cholo Cholo Nodi Kore Tolmolo.

== Life and career ==
Nadira Begum was born to A.K.M. Abdul Aziz, a classical and folk singer. She was enlisted as a radio artiste in 1960s.

Begum served as the president of the Bhawaiya Academy.

Begum died in Dhaka on 6 November 2023. She was buried in Joypurhat District.
