= Motiul Haque Khan =

Bangladeshi musician

- Born: 12 March 1933 (age 93); Brahmanbaria District, Bengal Presidency, British India
- Occupation: Musician

Motiul Haque Khan (born 12 March 1933) is a Bangladeshi sitar player. He is the recipient of Shilpakala Padak in 2013 and Ekushey Padak in 2018.

== Career ==
Khan started teaching music at Bulbul Lalitkala Academy in 1957. He played sitar in the inaugural day of Bangladesh Television in 1964.
