= Kalidas Karmakar =

Bangladeshi artist (1946–2019)

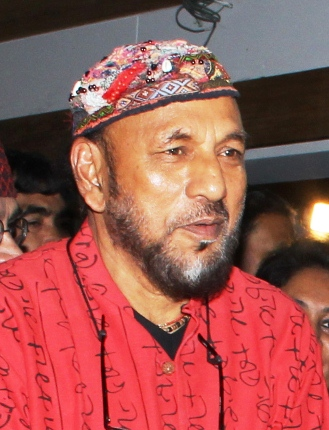
- Karmakar in 2016
- Born: 10 January 1946; Faridpur, Bengal Presidency, British India
- Died: 18 October 2019 (aged 73)
- Education: Government College of Art & Craft
- Known for: printmaking, painting

Kalidas Karmakar (10 January 1946 – 18 October 2019) was a Bangladeshi artist. He specialized in viscosity printing. He was awarded Shilpakala Padak (2016) and the Ekushey Padak (2018) by the government of Bangladesh for his contribution to fine arts.

== Early life ==
Karmakar completed a two-year pre-degree course at Institute of Fine Arts at the University of Dhaka. In 1969, he later graduated from Government College of Art & Craft in Kolkata. His first ever-major solo exhibition was held at Bangladesh Shilpakala Academy Gallery in August 1976. He worked with the English painter Stanley William Hayter.

He died on 18 October 2019 at the age of 73.

== Awards ==
- Sultan Gold Award (2015)
- Shilpakala Padak (2016)
- Ekushey Padak (2018)
