= Amanul Haque =

- আমানুল হক
- Occupation: Dancer

Amanul Haque is a Bangladeshi dancer. He was awarded Ekushey Padak award in 2016 by the Government of Bangladesh in the category of arts (dance).

== Career ==
Haq took dance lessons of Bharatanatyam, Kuchipudi and Manipuri dance from Ghanashyam Das Lakshman Bijoy and his wife Nileema. In 1959, he started his career as a dancer in Ghanashyam Anjariya in Karachi, Pakistan. He is the convenor of Bangladesh Nrityashilpi Sangstha (BNSS).

In 1963, Haque joined the Industrial Development Bank of Pakistan while continuing his practice of music and dance.

In 1964, Haque became the first person from East Pakistan to appear as a dancer on Karachi Television. He became the dance director of his debut film titled Neela Parbat. In 1966, he joined Barin Mazumder's music college. Later, he joined a cultural organization Kranti.

== Works ==
- Jolche Agun Khete Khamare (1967)
- Mukhi Matara
- Kaberi Teere
- Kushumer Shopno
- Bikhubdho 7 June
- Battle of Bangladesh
- Ei Desh Ei Mati Amar

== Awards ==
- Ekushey Padak (2016)
- Shilpakala Padak (2013)
- Bulbul Chowdhury Memorial Award (2013)
- BACHSHASH Award for music composition of Dahan and Annyajibon
- Shanta Marium University Award
- Nrittyadhara Award
- Benuka Sangeet Academy Award
