= Amaresh Roy Chowdhury =

Amaresh Roy Chowdhury অমরেশ রায় চৌধুরী
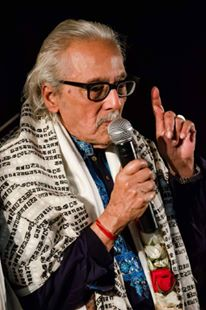
- Chowdhury speaking at an award ceremony

Background information
- Born: 18 September 1928; Faridpur, Bengal Presidency, British India
- Died: 12 August 2025 (aged 96) Rajshahi, Bangladesh
- Instrument: Vocalist
- Spouse: Sonali Roy Chowdhury

Amaresh Roy Chowdhury (18 September 1928 – 12 August 2025) was a Bangladeshi classical vocalist of the Indian subcontinent. He was awarded the Ekushey Padak in 2016 by the Government of Bangladesh for his contribution to classical music.

== Early life ==
Amaresh Roy Chowdhury was born in the village of Chouddoroshi in the district of Faridpur, Bengal Presidency, British India on 18 September 1928, to Avinash Roy Chowdhury and Rajlakshmi Roy Chowdhury. They belonged to the family of Roy Bahadur Mahendra Narayan Roy Chowdhury of Faridpur. He moved to Rajshahi after the liberation war of Bangladesh in 1971, and has been living there with his wife Sonali Roy Chowdhury and family since then.

When he was in fifth grade, he started learning classical music. He started training from Pandit Sudhir Lal Chakrabarty, a famous music composer from the subcontinent. After his sudden death, Amaresh went to Harihar Shukla, another famous musician from Sirajganj, father of the famous Indian singer Haimanti Sukla, for vocal training. Afterward, he received training Dhrupada, Khayal and Thumri from Sangeetacharya Tarapada Chakraborty. He also learned modern songs and raagas from composer Nikhil Chandra Sen, and received vocal training from Manas Chakroborty. After passing his matriculation in 1945, he continued learning and practicing classical music.

== Career ==
Chowdhury taught music at Shilpashram Lalitkala Academy in Rajshahi.

Chowdhury noted down the tunes of the songs by Kazi Nazrul Islam from their original records and preserved them in notations.

== Personal life and death ==
Chowdhury was married to Sonali Roy Chowdhury, who died in 2022. He died on 12 August 2025, at the age of 96.

== Awards ==
- Sanket Sangskritik Goshthi Award (1981)
- Ustad Gul Mohammad Memorial Award by Sangeet Academy (1982)
- Gunijan Sammanona by Bangladesh Shilpakala Academy (1997)
- "Pandit" Title given by Noborupi, Dinajpur (2000).
- National Leader Shaheed “AHM Kamaruzzaman Sammanona Smarok” (2010)
- "Rabindra Padak"” by Jatiya Rabindra Sangeet Sammilan Parishad (2014)
- Shilpakala Padak by Bangladesh Shilpakala Academy (2014)
- Ekushey Padak (2016)
