= Kazi Ebadul Haque =

Bangladeshi judge (1936–2022)

Kazi Ebadul Hoque
- Born: 1 January 1936; Feni, Bengal Province, British India
- Died: 14 July 2022 (aged 86); Dhaka, Bangladesh
- Occupation: Judge
- Known for: Language activist
- Spouse: Sharifa Khatun
- Children: Kazi Zinat Hoque

Kazi Ebadul Hoque (1 January 1936 – 14 July 2022) was a Bangladeshi judge who served in the appellate division of the Supreme Court of Bangladesh. He was awarded Ekushey Padak in 2016 by the government of Bangladesh for his contribution to Bengali language movement. His daughter, Kazi Zinat Hoque, is a judge on the High Court Division of the Bangladesh Supreme Court.

== Life and career ==
Hoque originated from Feni District. He served as the president of the United Nations Association of Bangladesh until his death.

Hoque died in Dhaka, Bangladesh on 14 July 2022, at the age of 86.
