= Nikhil Sen =

Bangladeshi dramatist (1931–2019)

- নিখিল সেন
- Born: 16 April 1931; Barishal District, Bengal Presidency, British India
- Died: 25 February 2019 (aged 87); Barishal, Bangladesh
- Awards: full list

Nikhil Sen (16 April 1931 – 25 February 2019) was a Bangladeshi dramatist, educator and political activist. He was awarded Ekushey Padak in 2018 by the Government of Bangladesh.

== Early life ==
Sen was born on 16 April 1931 at Kalash village of Barishal District to Jatish Chandra Sengupta and Shorojini Sengupta. After completing his secondary education, he went to Kolkata for higher education and was admitted to Kolkata City College. After his graduation, he came back to Barishal.

== Career ==
Sen participated in cultural activities, especially theatre and recitation in Barisal since 1941. He was the founder member of the Barisal Shilpi Sangsad, formed in 1951. In 1953, he formed a theater troupe named Barisal Theatre. As of 2005, he had directed 28 stage plays including Manoj Mitra's Shajano Bagan, Momtazuddin Ahmed's Nildarpan and Mamunur Rashid's Ora Kadam Ali.

== Awards and honors ==
- District Shilpakala Academy Reception (1996)
- Bangladesh Group Theatre Federation Reception (1999)
- Martyr Muneir Chowdhury Award (2005)
- Shilpakala Padak (2015)
- Ekushey Padak (2018)
