= Sharifa Khatun =

- শরিফা খাতুন
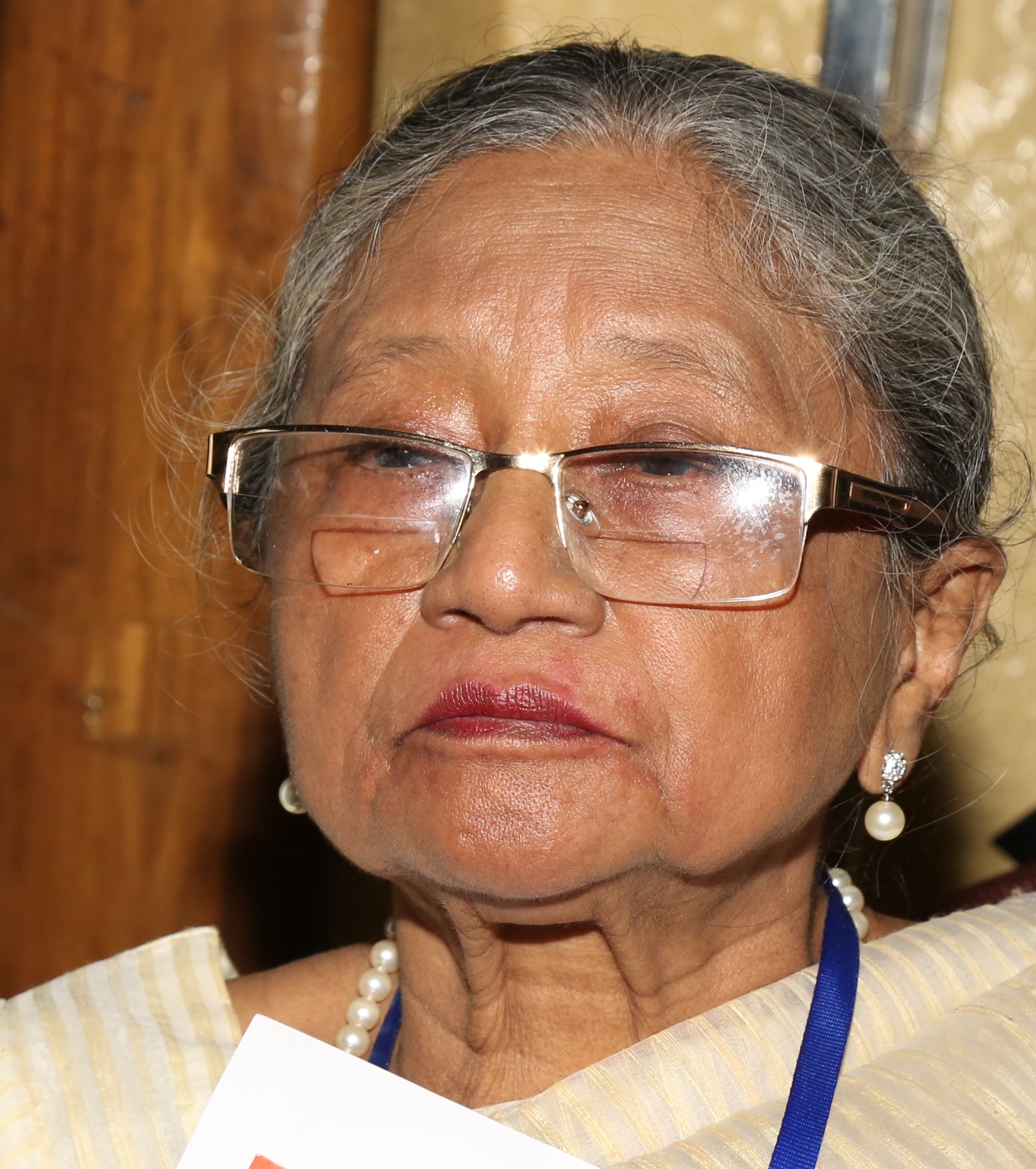
- Khatun receiving Ekushey Padak (Feb 2017)
- Occupations: university academic, activist
- Spouse: Justice Kazi Ebadul Haque
- Children: Justice Kazi Zinat Hoque

Sharifa Khatun is a Bangladeshi academic. She served as the director of Institute of Education and Research at the University of Dhaka during May 1993 to May 1996. She was a language movement activist in 1952. In 2017, she was awarded Ekushey Padak by the Government of Bangladesh for her contribution to the language movement. She also serves as an editor of Banglapedia, the national encyclopedia of Bangladesh.
