= Samarjit Roy Chowdhury =

Bangladeshi painter (1937–2022)

- সমরজিৎ রায় চৌধুরী
- Born: 10 February 1937; Comilla District, Bengal Presidency, British India
- Died: 9 October 2022 (aged 85); Dhaka, Bangladesh
- Education: University of Dhaka
- Awards: Ekushey Padak

Samarjit Roy Chowdhury (10 February 1937 – 9 October 2022) was a Bangladeshi painter. He was awarded Ekushey Padak in 2014 by the Government of Bangladesh. He was one of the artists among with Zainul Abedin and Abul Barak Alvi who contributed to the first ever hand-crafted constitution of Bangladesh.

== Early life and education ==
Chowdhury was born on 10 February 1937 in Comilla District. In 1960 he graduated in Graphic Design from the Government Art Institute (later Faculty of Fine Art, Dhaka University). There he was guided by Zainul Abedin, Quamrul Hassan and others.

== Career ==
Chowdhury joined the faculty of Dhaka University and worked for 43 years and retired as Professor in 2003. Then he served as Dean of the Department of Fine and Performing Arts of the Shanto-Mariam University of Creative Technology until 2010. As of 2014, he was serving as supernumerary professor at the University of Dhaka.

== Personal life and death ==
Chowdhury died in Dhaka on 9 October 2022, at the age of 85.

== Awards ==
- 1st Prize in the Pakistan Textile Design Competition (1960)
- East Pakistan Railway Timetable Cover Design Prize (1960)
- Ekushey Padak (2014)
