= Bangladesh Photographic Society =

Learned society

- Formation: December 21, 1975; 50 years ago
- Type: Nonprofit
- Headquarters: Dhaka, Bangladesh
- Region served: Bangladesh
- Official language: Bengali
- Website: bpsbd.org

Bangladesh Photographic Society is a national photographic society located in Dhaka, Bangladesh. It had the first photography gallery in Bangladesh with its own dark room. It is a member of the International Federation of Photographic Art.

== History ==
Bangladesh Photographic Society was established on 1 January 1976 by photographers based in Bangladesh. The society owns and operates the Bangladesh Photographic Institute where photography training is provided. The society also organises annual national and biannual international photography competitions. The institute organises symposiums and seminars in Bangladesh.

On 18 November 2012, a workshop on "Light in Portrait Photography" was jointly organized by Bangladesh Photographic Society and Shilpakala Academy. In 2019 the society held an international contest.
