= Manzoor Alam Beg =

Bangladeshi photographer

- মনজুর আলম বেগ
- Manzoor Alam Beg
- Born: 1 October 1931; Nawabganj, Malda district, Bengal Presidency
- Died: 26 July 1998 (aged 66)
- Occupation: Photographer
- Known for: Fine art photography and fine-art photographic movements in Bangladesh

Manzoor Alam Beg (Bengali: মনজুর আলম বেগ; 1 October 1931 – 26 July 1998) was a Bangladeshi photographer. He was awarded the Ekushey Padak in 2007 by the government of Bangladesh.

== Early life and family ==
Beg was born on 1 October 1931 in his maternal home in Shyampur, Nawabganj, Malda district, Bengal Presidency. He belonged to a Bengali Muslim family of Begs from Murshidabad. He was the third child of Professor Husam Uddin Beg of Murshidabad and Zaheda Chowdhury of Nawabganj. His father was a former principal of Brojomohun College in Barisal.

Beg married Walida Chowdhury on 17 March 1963. They had three children: photographer Iftekhar Alam Beg, photographer Imtiaz Alam Beg, and Ishtiaque Alam Beg. Beg's eldest brother, Mahmood Alam Beg, was the deputy governor of Bangladesh Bank, which is the country's central bank. His younger brother, Captain Mahfuz Alam Beg, was the sub-sector commander of Sector 9 in the independence war of Bangladesh in 1971.

== Training and education ==
Beg received photographic training at the Technical Training Centre of the Pakistan Air Force in Karachi in 1949. UNESCO training on microfilming in Karachi (1957). British government training on document reproduction at Hatfield College of Technology in the UK (1968). Kodak Colour Film course at Kodak Photographic School at Harrow in London (1968). Diploma in photography from the British Institute of Reprographic Technology (1976). A training course for information centre managers organised by UNESCO and the Government of India in New Delhi (1980).

== Career ==
Beg set up of the Begart Institute of Photography in 1960, the nation's first training facility for photography. In 1976, he founded the Bangladesh Photographic Society. He was well known for organising photographers and photographic activities in a place that had practically no recent history of institutional or professional photography. Manzoor Alam Beg was honoured as ESFIAP at the FIAP (the distinction "Excellence for Services Rendered" is awarded to those persons who have accomplished exceptional services over a long period for the benefit of the International Federation of Photographic Art) 19th Congress in Germany, 1987. He was honored with the title Aalokchitracharjo (The Chancellor of Photography) by BPS on behalf of the Bangladeshi photographers community. He is considered the father of fine art photography movements in Bangladesh. Manzoor Alam Beg has been awarded the most prestigious Ekushey Podak given by the Bangladesh government in 2007, besides 200 more national and international awards and honors.

== Death ==
Beg died on 26 July 1998.

== Professional careers ==
Beg served in the following organizations.

- United States Information Services (USIS), Dhaka 1955 – 1957.
- PANSDOC National Documentation Centre, Karachi 1957 – 1960.
- Bangladesh National Scientific and Technical Documentation Centre BANSDOC Dhaka 1963 – 1988.

== Books on photography ==
1. Report on Photography, published in UK, 1968.
2. Adhunik Photography, published in India, 1974.
3. Photography Formula, 1974.
4. Photography Digest, 1981.
5. Rangin Photo Printing, 1985.
6. Microfilm ki o kano, 1991.
7. Alokchitron shadakalo o Rangin, 1993.
8. Darkroom Solution, 1994.

== Honours ==
- Honorary Fellow of the Bangladesh Photographic Society, 1983.
- Honorary life membership of WIF (Worldview International Foundations), 1982.
- Hon FPAD (the highest honour in photography) India, 1982.
- CINE-SEEK PODAK by the Cine – Seek Audio- visual club Dhaka, 1986.
- Awarded ASIIPC by the India International Photographic Council, 1991.
- FSIPC by the India International Photographic Council (IIPC), 1997.
- Photography Charcha honour at Calcutta Book Fair 1997.
- Alokchitracharjo (Chancellor of Photography) by the Bangladesh Photographic Society, 1998 .

== Awards ==
- The Cento Photo Contest Prize (Bronze) Ankara, 1968
- ACCU UNESCO Prize, Japan, 1976
- Hon Diploma, USSR, 1977
- ACCU Rotary Prize, Japan, 1977
- Two Hon Mention Prizes, Canada, 1977
- First Prize Photo kina, Germany, 1978
- First Prize, Pentax, UK, 1986
- First prize World and I, US, 1986
- First prize World and I, US, 1987
- Ekushey Padak (2007)
