= Maliha Khatun =

Bangladeshi academic

- Born: Pabna
- Died: 24 May 2002; Dhaka, Bangladesh
- Education: University of Dhaka; Bethune College

Maliha Khatun (died 24 May 2002) was a Bangladeshi educationist, writer and social worker. She was awarded Begum Rokeya Padak in 2001 by the Government of Bangladesh. She served as the first woman principal of Dhaka Teachers' Training College.

== Early life ==
Khatun's father, Kazi Sanaullah, was a professor of Arabic and Persian at the Presidency College, Calcutta. She completed her BA honors from Bethune College, Calcutta, after securing a first division in matriculation from Sakhawat Memorial School. She got her master's in Bengali and philosophy. She did her diploma and post-graduation in education and psychology respectively from the University of Edinburgh in 1957. In 1987, she obtained her Ph.D. degree in educational psychology from the University of Dhaka.

== Career ==
After teaching for a few years, Khatun was appointed assistant inspector of schools in Rajshahi Division and subsequently, became the inspector, where she spent a major portion of her career.

Khatun retired from the position of principal of Government Teachers' Training College, Dhaka, in 1982.

== Awards ==
- Dewan Abdul Hamid Literary Award
- Nazrul National Award
- Sher-e-Bangla National Award

== Personal life and legacy ==
Khatun was married to S. M. Shamsul Haque, an academic. Together they had three children Shamima Nargis, Humayun Kamal, Nishat and Khurshid Anwar. Shamima died in the Moorgate tube crash incident in 1975. Humayun served as the Ambassador of Bangladesh to China, Korea and Poland.

"Dr Maliha Khatun Scholarship Fund" was created at the University of Dhaka in 2009.

Her sister Ms Razia khatun was also a renowned educationist who worked in khulna, mymensingh and Dhaka.
