= Halida Hanum Akhter =

Reproductive health epidemiologist

- হালিদা হানুম আখতার
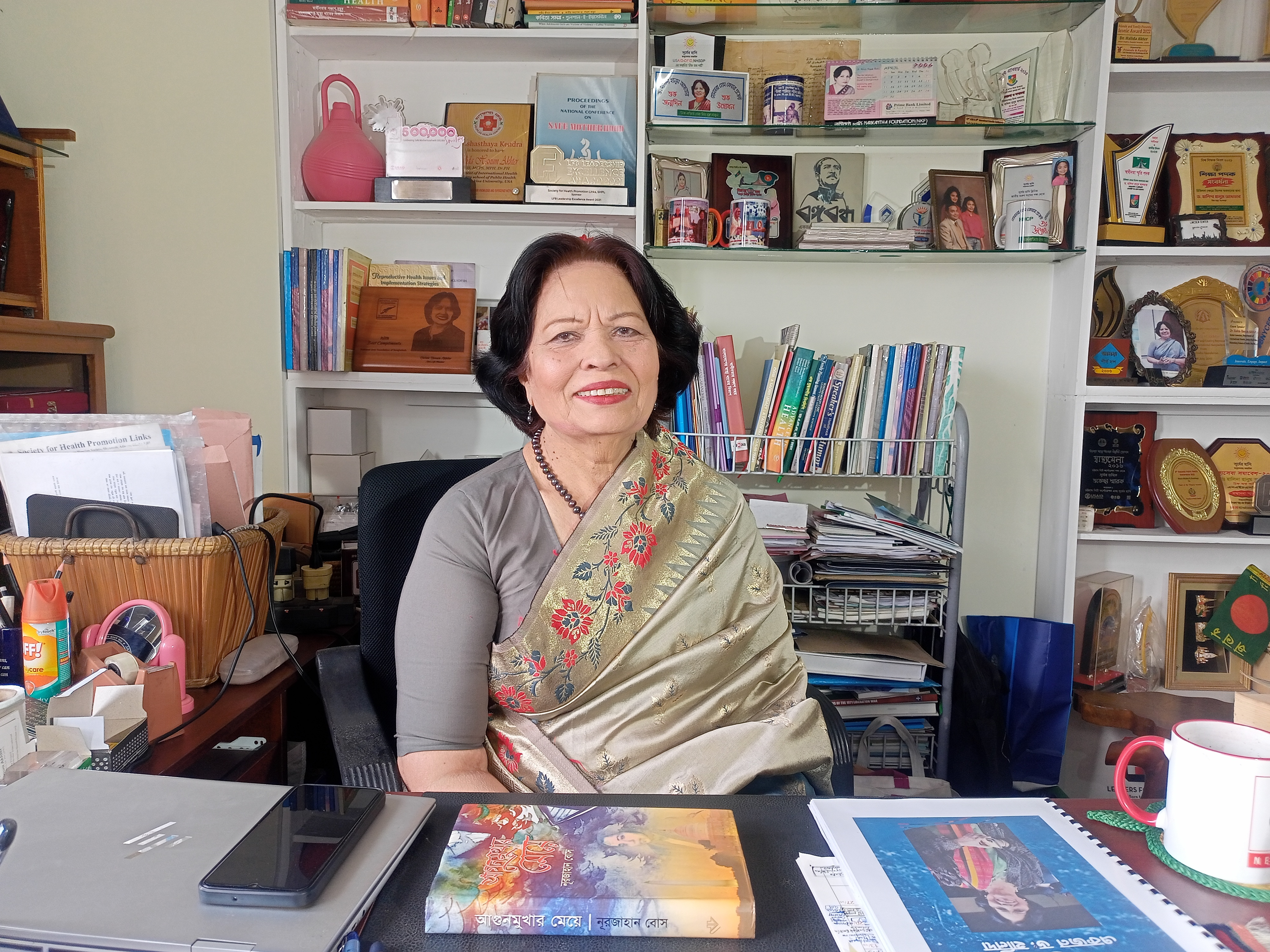
- Akhter in Dhaka (2023)
- Born: 18 January 1945 (age 81); Rajshahi, British India
- Occupation: Public Health Expert
- Awards: Bangla Academy Fellowship (2023), Begum Rokeya Padak (2020)

Halida Hanum Akhter is a Bangladeshi reproductive health doctor and public health expert. In 2023, she received the Begum Rokeya Padak of the government of Bangladesh for her special contribution to the establishment of women's rights. She received the Bangla Academy Fellowship in 2023. She received the 'Developing Countries Award 1995' from the Justus-Liebig University Giessen, Germany in recognition of her contribution to improving health status of women and children. As a Director-General, Family Planning Association of Bangladesh, with Haiti's Foundation for Reproductive Health and Family Education (FOSREF) has won the 2006's United Nations Population Award. Akhter received the award for her outstanding contribution to raising awareness on family planning and population issues.

== Career ==
Akhtar is the founder and director of the Reproductive Health Research Institute of Bangladesh. She served as the Director General of the largest family planning organization in Bangladesh. She worked as a senior fellow in the Department of International Health at the Johns Hopkins Bloomberg School of Public Health on women's reproductive health. Also served as Head of USAID-DFID's NGO Health Care Project, as Head of Pathfinder International. She created a 'soil bank' for pregnant women for pregnant woman. She has played an influential role in Surjer Hashi Clinics in Bangladesh.

== Awards ==
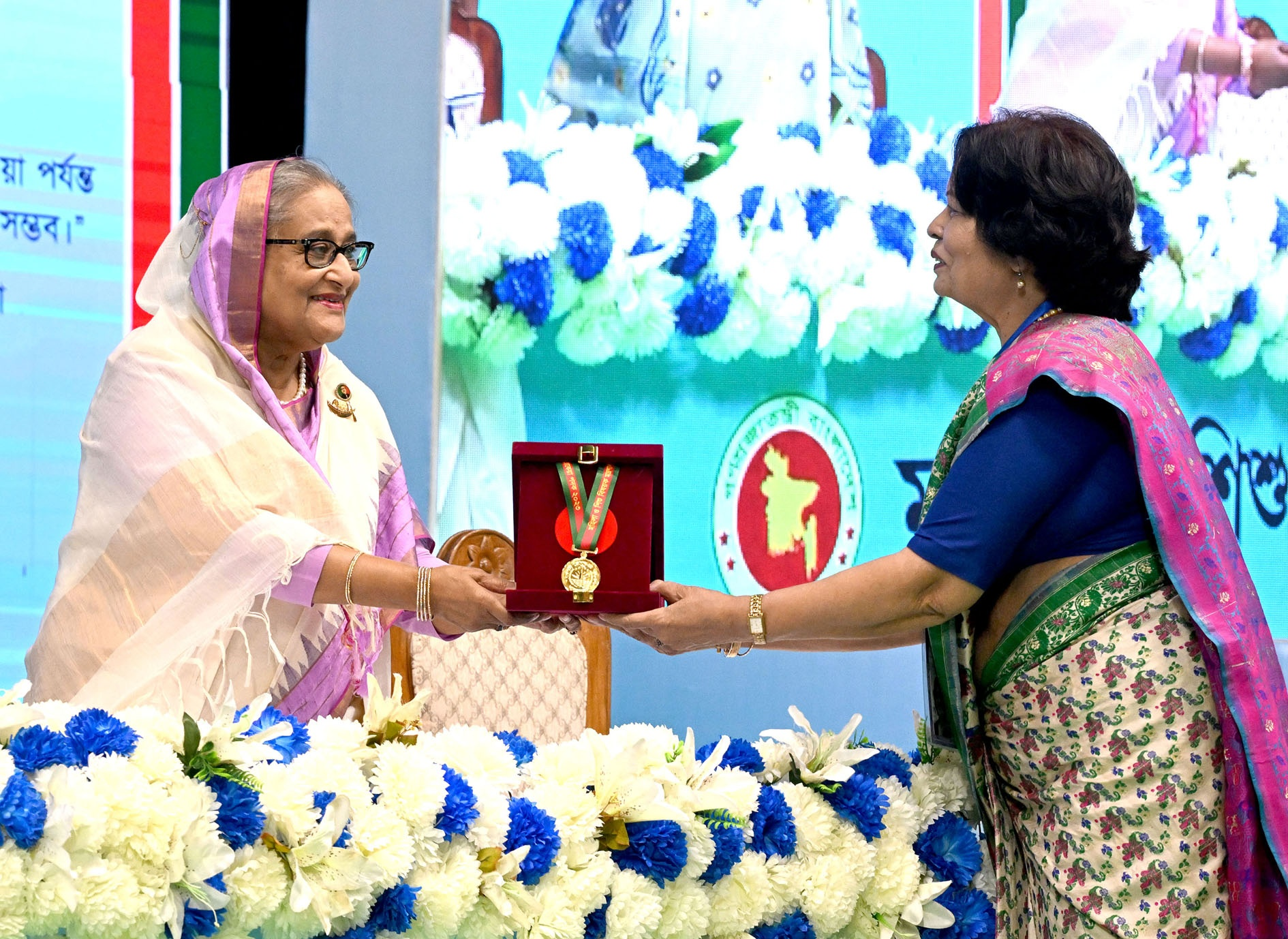
Akhter receiving 2023 Begum Rokeya Padak

- 'Developing Countries Award 1995' from the Justus-Liebig University Giessen, Germany
- United Nations Population Award 2006
- Begum Rokeya Padak of the Government of Bangladesh 2023
