= Quran translations into Bengali =

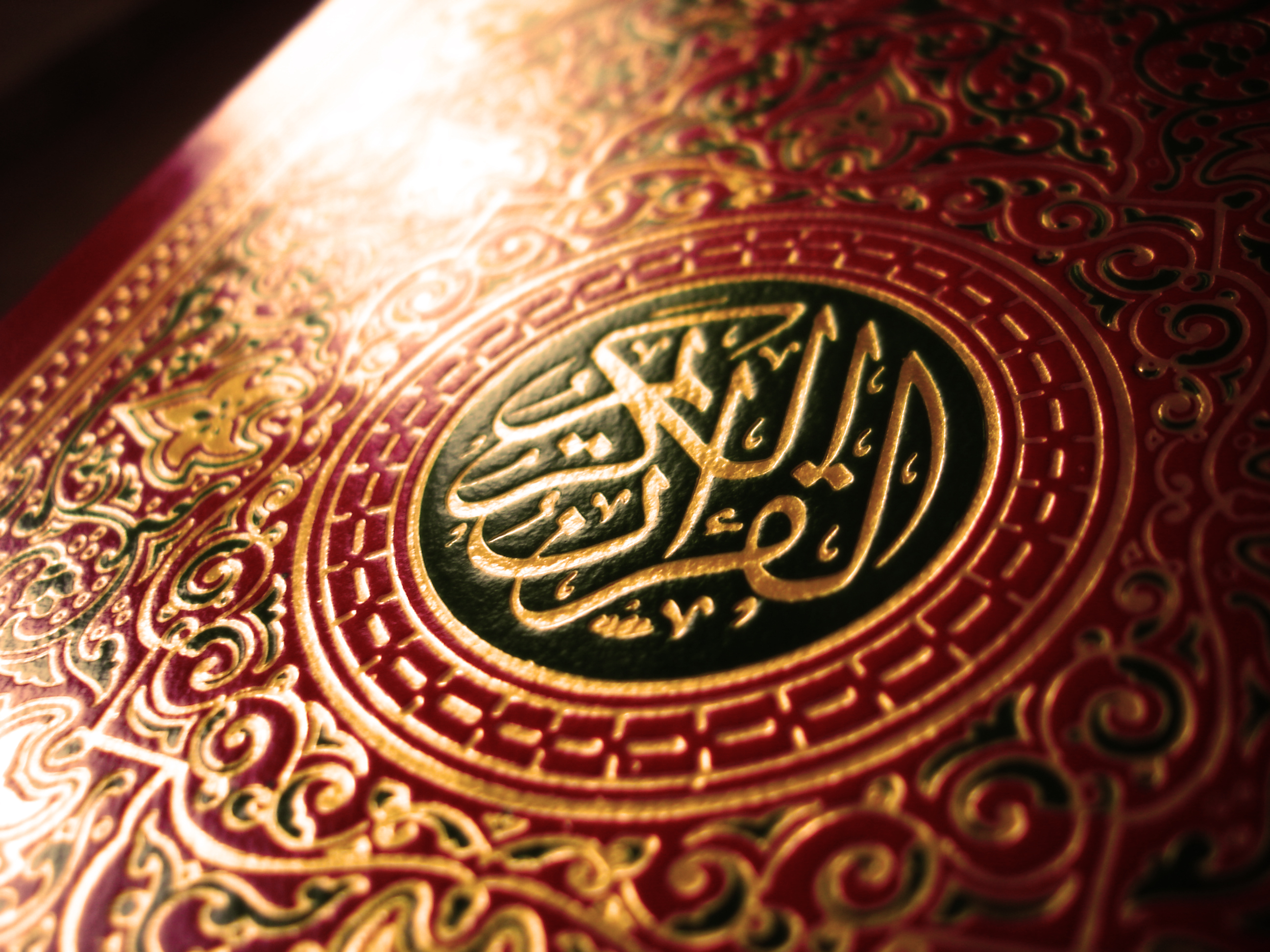
Quran, the holy book of Islam

The earliest Quran translations into Bengali language occurred in 1389, when Shah Muhammad Sagir (one of the oldest poets of Bengali literature) translated surahs of the Quran into the old Bengali language. However, full translation of the Quran from Arabic to Bengali began in the early nineteenth century.

== Timeline ==
Multiple translations of the Quran were published in the nineteenth, twentieth and twenty-first centuries. Though many people have done partial translations, such as Maulana Amir Uddin Basuniya, Girish Chandra Sen was the first to translate and publish the entire Quran.

=== In the 19th century ===
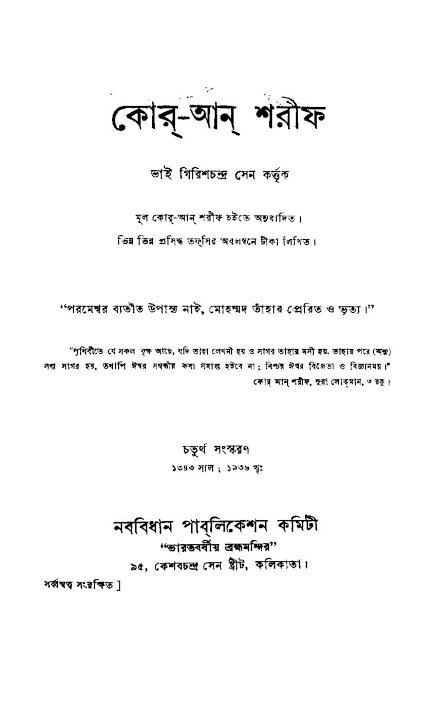
Quran translation of Girish Chandra Sen

At the beginning of the nineteenth century, in 1808 or 1809, Maulana Amir Uddin Basunia, a resident of Matukpur, Rangpur, completed a Bengali translation of Ampara. Although it was a partial translation, it was printed via lithography and had 168 pages.

Many leaders such as Haji Shariyat Ullah, Maulana Karamat and Ali Jaunpuri made great efforts in Bengal for Bengali Muslims but none of them tried to translate the Quran into Bengali.

Girish Chandra Sen (c. 1834-1910), a Brahmo missionary, was the first to translate the entire Quran into Bengali. He published it gradually between 1881 and 1883. It was a literal translation with a clear and smooth linguistic style. The translation had been hugely praised by various Muslim scholars and writers as an early literary work.

After this, Akbar Ali of Patwar Bagan, Calcutta came forward to translate the Quran into Bengali. Then, during the British-Indian period, Khan Bahadur Maulvi Taslimuddin Ahmad CIE of Jalpaiguri, Rajendranath Mitra, Pastor Taracharan Bandyopadhyay, Maulana Muhammad Naimuddin of Tangail (1832-1907), Akbar Uddin of Dinajpur, and a native Christian Philip Biswas also made partial translations.

=== In the 20th century ===
==== During British Raj ====
- 1905: Maulana Akram Khan (1868-1968). He translated the Quran into Bengali and Urdu.
- 1905: Sri Kiran Gopal Singha (1885-1942). He was first Hindu to translate the Quran into Bengali.
- 1907: Translation of Maulavi Abbas Ali of 24 Pargana.
- 1911: Muhammad Meherullah Sani (1856-1918) 'বাংলা কোরআন শরিফ'
- 1913: Alauddin Ahmad (1851-1915) and Hafez Mahmud Shah. His translation was published at Kolkata.
- 1914: Maulana Khondkar Abul Fazl Abdul Karim (1876-1947) কোরআন, Tangail.
- 1916: Munshi Karim Bakhsh, from Kolkata.
- 1917: Abdul Sattar Sufi, from Kolkata.
- 1917: Maulana Muhammad Ruhul Amin (1875-1945).
- 1920: Maulana Yar Ahmad (died 1944). 'আমপারা বাঙ্গালা তফসির', Dhaka.
- 1922: Mohammod Abdul Hakim (1887-1957) and Mohammod Ali Hasan of Gopalganj. কোরআন শরিফ, from Kolkata.
- 1923: Maulana Sheikh Idris Ahmad. কোরআনের মহাশিক্ষা.
- 1924: Maulana Fazel Maqimi. Two parts of the Quran.
- 1925: Faizuddin Ahmed (1899-1935). from Dhaka.
- 1925: Khan Bahadur Maulvi Taslimuddin Ahmad CIE (1852–1927) of Jalpaiguri. Three volumes with tafsir, published from Calcutta.
- 1926: Maulana Khondkar Golam Rosul of Jhenaidah বাঙ্গালা পাঞ্জ সুরাহ.
- 1927: M. Abdur Rashid Siddiki of Cox's Bazar 'মহা কোরআন কাব্য' from Kolkata.
- 1928: Maulana Osman Goni of Bardwaman পঞ্চমণি from Kolkata.
- 1928: Maulana Ahmod Ali of Jessore (1898-1959).
- 1929: Maulana Kafil Uddin Siddiki তরজমা পাঞ্জে সুরা from Kolkata.
- 1930: Fazlur Rahim Chowdhury কোরআন শরিফ, Kolkata.
- 1930: Morshed Ali কোরআন দর্পণ, Dhaka.
- 1930: Mir Fazle Ali (1898-1939). কোরআন কণিকা, from Kolkata.
- 1931: Muhammod Azhar Uddin of Rajbari. কোরআনের আলো from Kolkata.
- 1932: Abdul Aziz Hindi (1867-1926) of Kumilla. কোরআন শরিফ from Noakhali.
- 1933: Kazi Nazrul Islam কাব্য আমপারা in poetic Bangla from Kolkata.
- 1934: Saiyed Abul Khair Tajul Awliya বাংলা কোরআন শরিফ, from Tangail.
- 1935: Saiyed Abul Mansur কোরআন কুসুমাঞ্জলি.
- 1936: Ayub Ali Chowdhury (1877-1936) স্বর্গীয় কানন from Kolkata.
- 1936: Maulana Muhammad Golam Akbar আমপারার তফসির from Jessore.
- 1937: Basanta Kumar Mukhopadyaya was first Kulin Brahmin to translate Quran. পবিত্র কোরআন প্রবেশ. Dhaka.
- 1939: Muhammad Ismail of Chandpur আমপারার তরজমা from Tripura.
- 1940: Muhamnad Shamsul Huda of Narshindi নেয়ামুল কোরআন from Dhaka.
- 1941: Khan Bahadur Ahsan Ullah (1873-1965). from.Kolkata
- 1944: Mezanur Rahman of Brahman Baria নূরের ঝলক or কোরআনের আলো from Kolkata.
- 1945: Maulana Zulfikar Ali of Feni from Chattagram.
- 1946: D. Muhamnad Shahid Ullah (1885-1969). মহাবাণী from Bogura.
- 1947: Maulana Muneer Uddin Ahmod of Rangpur হাফিজিল কাদেরী from Rangpur.

==== During 1947-1971 ====
- 1962: Ashraf Ali Thanwi {{lang|bn|তাফসিরে আশরাফী}}
- 1963: Khondkar Mohammod Hucain সহজ পাক তফসির, from Tangail.
- 1966-67: Kazi Abdul Wadud পবিত্র কোরান, from Faridpur and Kolkata.
- 1967: Ali Haidar Chowdhury কোরআন শরিফ
- 1967: Maulana Belayet Hossain and others. কোরআনুল করিম from Dhaka.
- 1968: Mohammod Sayid Ibrahimpuri কোরআনের মুক্তাহার, from Chandpur.
- 1969: Hakim Abdul Mannan কোরআন শরিফ, from Dhaka.
- 1970: M. Nurul Islam তাফাসরুল কোরআন from Bogura.

==== From 1971 to 2000 ====
- 1970-72: Maulana M. Taher আল-কোরআন : তরজমা ও তাফসির.
- 1974: Maulana Nurur Rahman of 1909 তাফসিরে বয়ানুল কোরান, from Dhaka.
- 1974: Mobarak Karim Jauhar কোরআন শরিফ, from Kolkata.
- 1977: A K M Fazlur Rahman Munshi পবিত্র কোরআন শরিফ' from Kumilla.
- 1978-79: তাফহিমুল কোরআন : কোরআন মজিদের বাংলা তাফসির
- 1980: Maulana Muhidden Khan তাফসিরে মা'রেফুল কোরআন
- 1982: M. Khurshid Uddin তাফসিরে জালালাইন
- 1988: D.M.Mujibur Rahman and Akter Faruk তাফসিরে ইবনে কাছির, অধ্যাপক আখতার ফারুক
- 1992: D. Osman Goni কোরআন শরিফ Mallik Brothers, Kolkata.
- 1993: Farid Uddin Masud তাফসির-ই জালালাইন, Islamic foundation.
- 1994: Saudi Embassy বাংলা অনুপবিত্র কোরআনুল করিম বাদ ও সংক্ষিপ্ত তাফসির from Dhaka.
- 1994: Maulana M. Aminul Islam তাফসিরে নূরুল কোরআন, Al Balagh Publications.
- 1994: M. Obayedur Rahman Mallik তাফসিরে মাজেদি শরিফ, Islamic foundation.
- 1991-95: Malana M. Sakhawat Ullah তাফসিরে তাবারি শরিফ, Islamic foundation.
- 1995: Hafiz Muneer Uddin Ahmod তাফসির ফি যিলালিল কোরআন, Al Koran Academy.
- 1995: Maulana M A Bashir Uddin ছহীহ বঙ্গানুবাদ কোরআন শরিফ, Dhaka.
- 1996-97: Mahmud Hasan Deobandi and Shabbir Ahmad Usmani তাফসিরে উসমানী, Islamic foundation.
- 1997: D. Muhammad Mustafizur Rahman কোরান শরিফ, from Khosroz kitab mohol.
- 1998: Maulana Abul Bashar Muhammad Saiful Islam and Maulana Mazhar Uddin Ahmad of Charchina.
- 1999: Sadar Uddin Chisti তাফসিরে কোরআন,
- 2000: Justice Habibur Rahman. কোরআন শরিফ : সরল বঙ্গানুবাদ, from Dhaka.

=== In the 21st Century ===
- 2002: Koran Sharif সহজ সরল বাংলা অনুবাদ, Hafez Munir Uddin Ahmed, Al Koran Academy.
- 2006: ছন্দোবদ্ধ বাংলা কোরআন, Panna Chowdhury, Gontobyo Prokashani, Dhaka.
- 2006: পবিত্র আল কোরআনের পুঁথি অনুবাদ, Maulana Abdul Hameid Qasemi, aus New Hamidia Prokashan.
- 2007: কুর'আনুল কারীম by D. Mujibur Rahman, 3rd edition, Darussalam Publications, Kingdom of Saudi Arabia.
- 2010: কোরআন শরিফ, Abdullah Yusuf Ali, Maulana Mufti Muhammad Zakaria, Meena Book House.
- 2011: নূর নূরানি বাংলা উচ্চারণ, Bangla Translation and commentary on revelation. Maulana Osman Gani, Solemania Book House.
- 2012: বঙ্গানুবাদ কোরআন শরিফ, Maulana Muhammad Abdur Rahim (Rah), Khairun Prokashani.
- 2013: Tafsir of Abu Bakr Zakaria.
- 2017: তাফসিরে তাওযিহুল কোরআন, Origin: Taqi Usmani's translation: Maulana Abul Bashar Muhammad Saiful Islam. Maktabatul Ashraf.
- 2018: সহজ কোরআন, Asif Shibgat Bhuiyan, from Adarsha Library.
- 2020: Maulana Muhibur Rahman Khan আল কুরআনের কাব্যানুবাদ, from Rahnuma Prokashani, Dhaka.
- 2021: Mufti Abu Umama Qutubuddin Mahmud und Mufti Abdullah Shihab. আল কুরআন শব্দে শব্দে অর্থ, from Dhaka.

(ISBN 978-984-8046-62-3)

- 2023: Shohoj Bangla Quran সহজ বাংলা কুরআন, ইঞ্জিনিয়ার লে. কর্নেল এম আলাউদ্দীন, Mowla Brothers, Dhaka, Bangladesh.

== Comparison ==
| Translators | Quran 2:79 | English translation (by Google Translate) |
|---|---|---|
| Girish Chandra Sen (1886) | অনন্তর যাহারা স্বহস্তে পুস্তক লিখে, তৎপর সামান্য মূল্য গ্রহণ করিবার উদ্দেশ্যে বলে যে, ইহা ঈশ্বরের নিকট হইতে (সমাগত), ধিক্ তাহাদিগকে; অবশেষে তাহাদের হস্ত যা লিপি করিয়াছে তজ্জন্য তাহাদিগকে ধিক্, তাহাদের ব্যবসায় অবলম্বনের জন্য তাহাদিগকে ধিক্৷ | Then woe to those who write the book with their own hands, then say, "This is from God," in order to take a small price. Then woe to them for what their hands have written, and woe to them for their business. |
| Munir Uddin Ahmed (1995) | অতএব সেসব লোকেদের জন্য ধ্বংস (অনিবার্য), যারা হাত দিয়ে কিতাব লেখে নেয়, তারপর (দুনিয়ার সামনে) বলে, এগুলো হচ্ছে আল্লাহ তায়ালার পক্ষ থেকে (অবতীর্ণ শরীয়তের বিধান), তাদের উদ্দেশ্য হচ্ছে, যেন তা দিয়ে (দুনিয়ার) কিছু (স্বার্থ) তারা কিনে নিতে পারে; অতঃপর তাদের হাত যা কিছু রচনা করেছে তার জন্য তাদের ধ্বংস ও দুর্ভোগ, যা কিছু তারা উপার্জন করেছে তার জন্যেও তাদের দুর্ভোগ৷ | So woe to those who write the Book with their hands, then say, "This is from Allah," that they may purchase some (worldly) gain with it; then woe to them for what their hands have written, and woe to them for what they have earned. |
| Muhammad Habibur Rahman (2000) | সুতরাং দুর্ভোগ তাদের জন্য, যারা নিজ হাতে কিতাব রচনা করে আর সামান্য মুল্য পাবার জন্য বলে, ‘এটা আল্লাহ্‌র কাছ থেকে এসেছে!’ তাদের হাত যা রচনা করেছে তার জন্য তাদের শাস্তি, আর যা তারা উপার্জন করেছে তার জন্যেও তাদের শাস্তি। | So woe to those who write the book with their own hands and say, "This is from Allah," for a small price. Their punishment is for what their hands have written, and their punishment is for what they have earned. |

== See also ==
- Quran translations
- List of translations of the Quran
