= Nurun Nahar Faizannesa =

Bangladeshi feminist and social activist

- নুরুন নাহার ফয়জননেসা
- Born: 21 May 1932; Nadia district, Bengal Presidency, British India
- Died: 31 March 2004 (aged 71); Dhaka, Bangladesh
- Education: Lady Brabourne College; University of Dhaka; Colorado State University
- Spouse: Syed Moqsud Ali
- Children: Sadya Afreen Mallick
- Father: Khan Shahib Quazi Sadrul Ola

Nurun Nahar Faizannesa (21 May 1932 – 31 March 2004) was a Bangladeshi feminist and social activist. She was the first elected female member of the syndicate of the University of Dhaka and the National Pay Commission of Bangladesh.

== Early life and education ==
Faizannesa was born on 21 May 1932 at Chakda, Nadia district in West Bengal, British India. Through her mother, she was a descendant of the Murshidabad noble family. She attended the famous Sakhawat Memorial Govt. Girls' High School and Victoria Institution in Calcutta, went to Lady Brabourne College Calcutta. She graduated from Chittagong Govt. College in 1949. She then attended the University of Dhaka, obtained a master's in political science in 1952. She took a bachelor in education degree from Dhaka Teachers' Training college and was appointed a lecturer there. She was sent abroad on a Fulbright scholarship to the US in 1960. In 1966 she completed a PhD in education from Colorado State University.

== Career ==
Faizannesa joined the Siddheswari Girls' School in 1953. She taught at Viqarunnisa Noon School and College. In the 1950s, she helped establish the Azimpur Ladies Club and the related Agrani School and College. In 1959, she joined the Dhaka Teachers' Training College as a lecturer. In 1960, she joined the Institute of Education and Research under the University of Dhaka. She then joined Dhaka University Laboratory School in 1969 as the principal and served for five years. She was the treasurer of Women for Women from 1980 to 1981, and the vice-president from 1983 to 1985. From 1985 to 1986, she served as the first elected female member of the Dhaka University Syndicate. In 1986, she became a member of the board of governors of Bangladesh Public Administration Training Centre. She established a day care centre, Chhaya Nahar, in Dhaka University. From 1980 to 1990, she served as the provost of Rokeya Hall at the University of Dhaka. She helped establish 'Women studies' as a subject at the University of Dhaka. In 1996, she was elected as a member of the Bangladesh Public Administration Training Centre and the Bangladesh Government Wage Commission.

== Personal life ==
Faizannesa married Syed Maqsud Ali, a lecturer at the University of Dhaka, in 1950. In 1952 she finished an M. A. from the University of Dhaka in political science.

== Death ==
Faizannesa died on 31 March 2004 in Dhaka, Bangladesh.
