= Mongsen Ching Monsin =

Bangladeshi journalist, researcher, and writer (1961–2019)

- Born: 16 July 1961; Chalhatta, Cox's Bazar, Bangladesh
- Died: 7 September 2019 (aged 58); Majherbosti, Tobolchhori, Matiranga, Rangamati, Bangladesh
- Occupations: Journalist; Researcher; Writer
- Spouse: Shobha Rani Tripura
- Children: 2
- Awards: Ekushey Padak 2016

Mongsen Ching Monsin (16 July 1961 – 7 September 2019) was a Bangladeshi journalist, researcher and writer. He was awarded Ekushey Padak in 2016 for his contribution in research.

== Biography ==
Mongsen Ching Monsin was born in a Rakhine family of Chalhatta, Cox's Bazar on 16 July 1961. He wrote and researched about the people of Chittagong Hill Tracts. His first book Cox's Bazar Rakhine Somaj was published in 1980. He wrote more than 20 books. He wrote regularly on local dailies like Giridarpan and Oronnobarta too.

Mongsen Ching Monsin married Shobha Rani Tripura in 1984. She is a teacher and writer. She was awarded Begum Rokeya Padak in 2017. They had two daughters.

Mongsen Ching Monsin was awarded Ekushey Padak in 2016 for his contribution in research.

Mongsen Ching Monsin died on 7 September 2019 at the age of 58.
