= Begum Rokeya Padak =

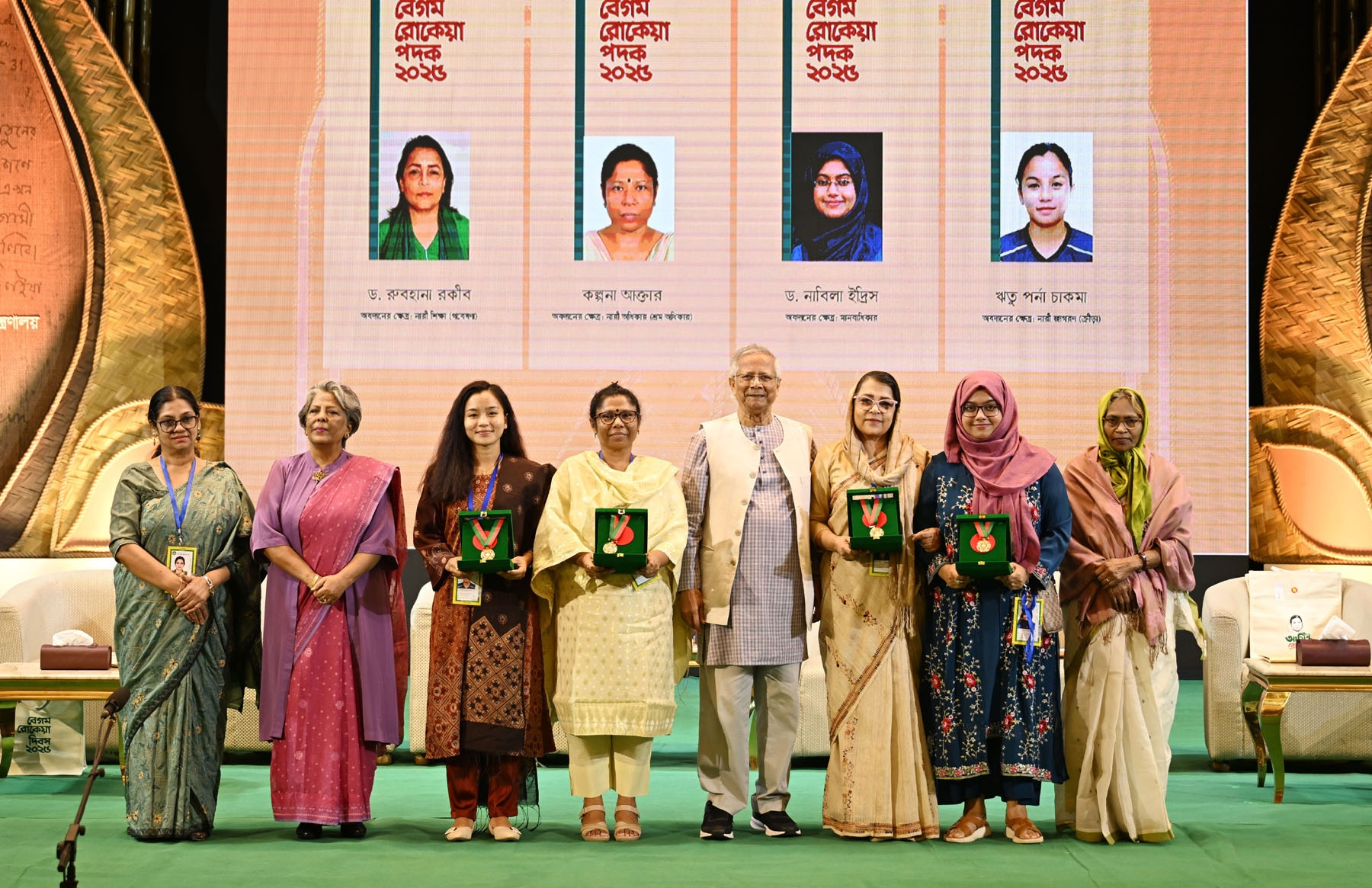
- 2025 winners
- Native name: বেগম রোকেয়া পদক
- Awarded for: Women's activism
- Location: Dhaka, Bangladesh
- Country: Bangladesh
- Presented by: Government of Bangladesh
- First award: 1995
- Final award: 2025

The Begum Rokeya Padak, named after Begum Rokeya, is a Bangladeshi national honour conferred on individual women for their exceptional achievement. The award is given by the Ministry of Women and Children Affairs of the Government of Bangladesh. First awarded in 1995, the Rokeya Padak recognises the pioneering contribution of an individual in empowering women and raising women's issues.

Each recipient receives a gold medal weighing 25 grams of 18-karat gold, a certificate of honour, and a cash reward. The cash reward was tk 2,00,000 from May 2017. It was increased to tk 4,00,000 from November 2019.

== Award winners ==
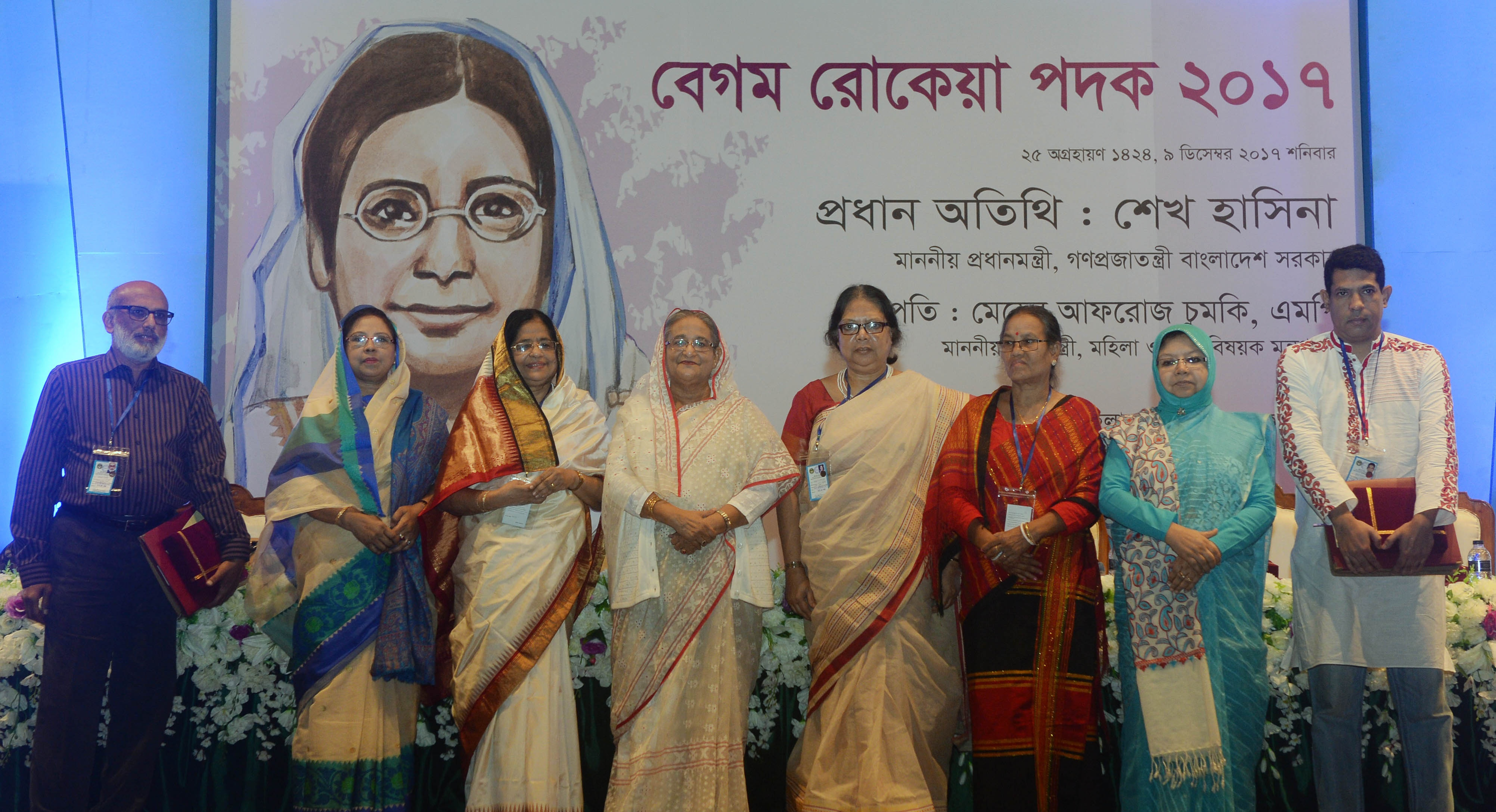
2017 winners

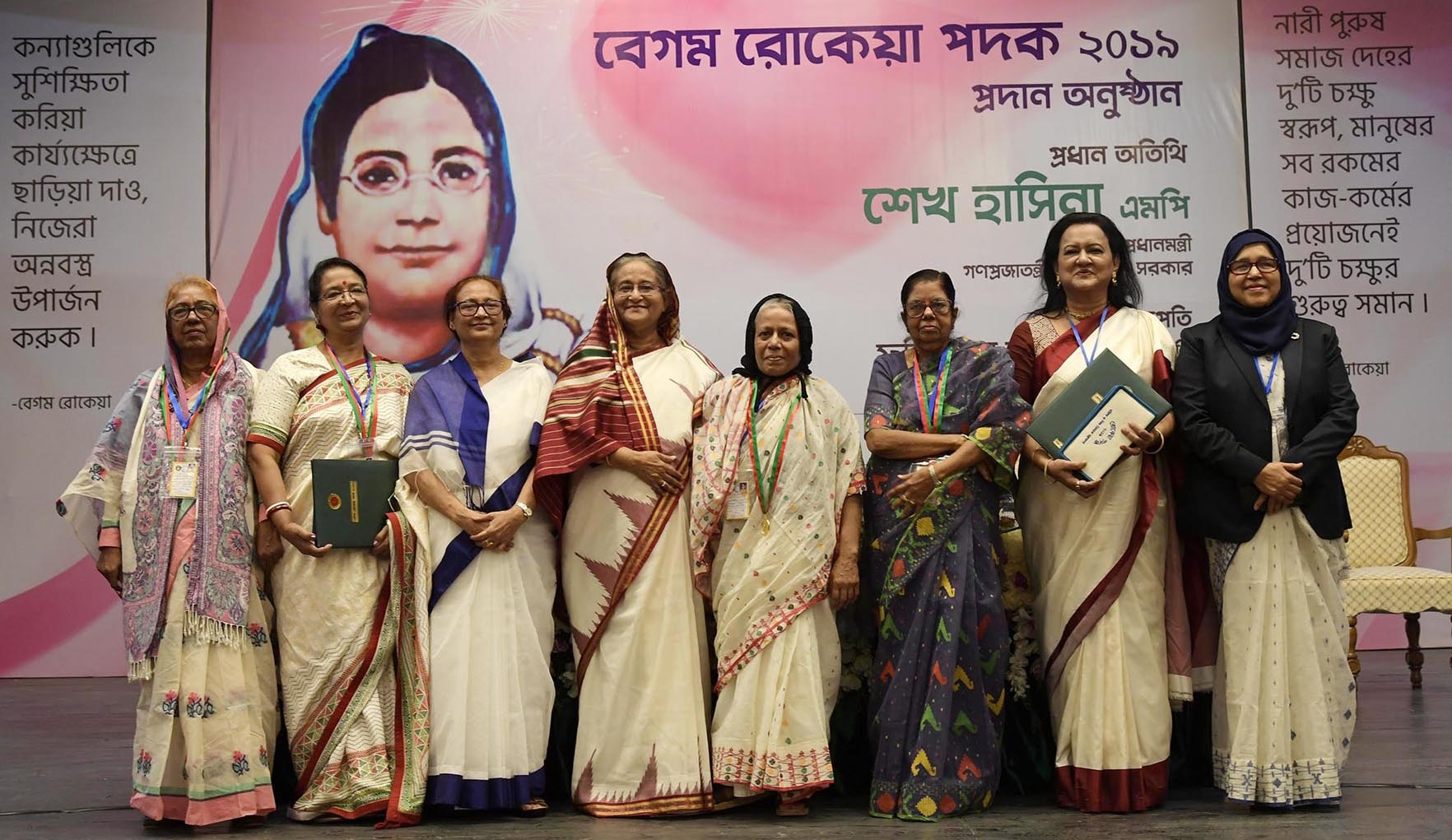
2019 winners

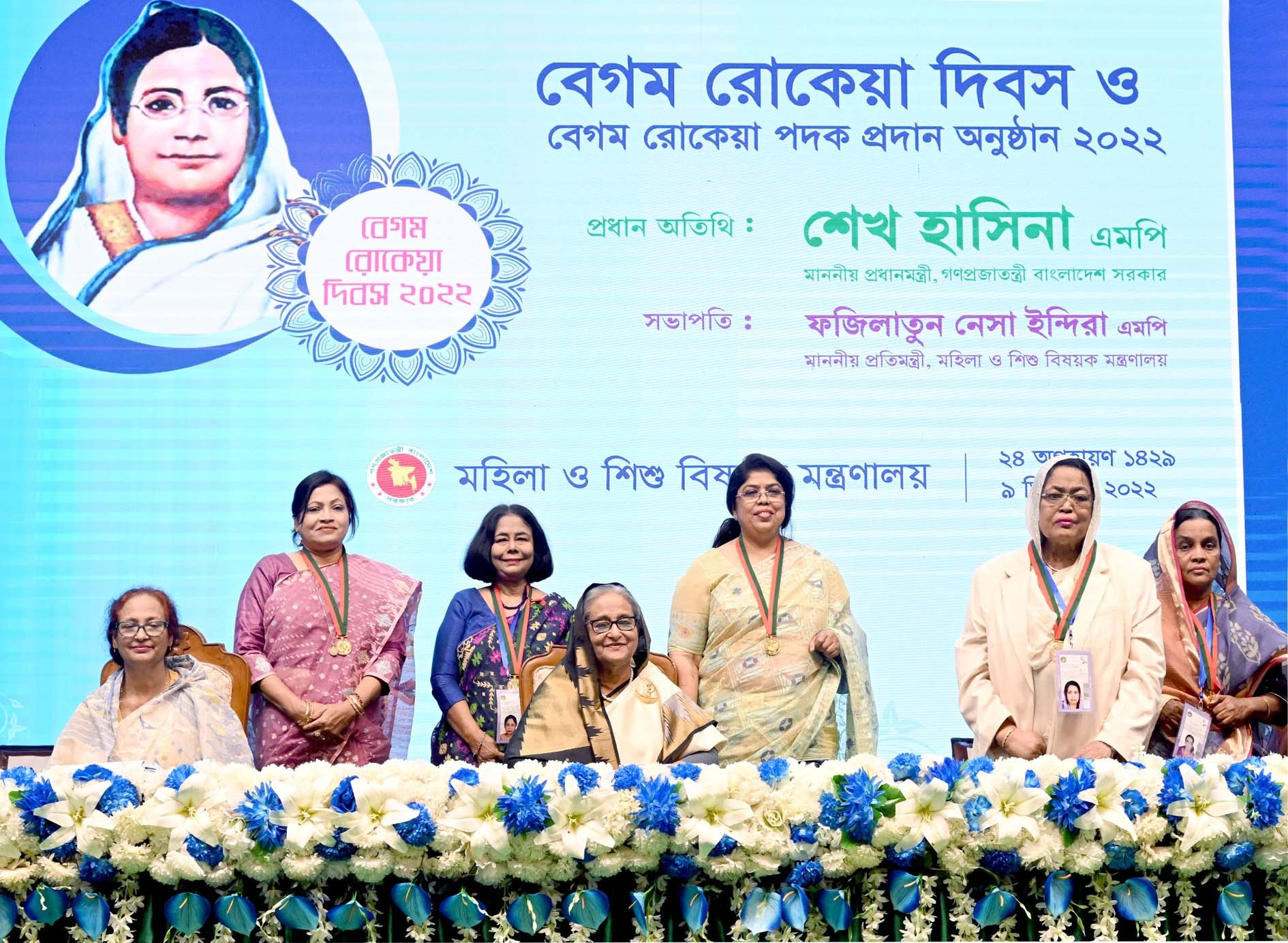
2022 winners

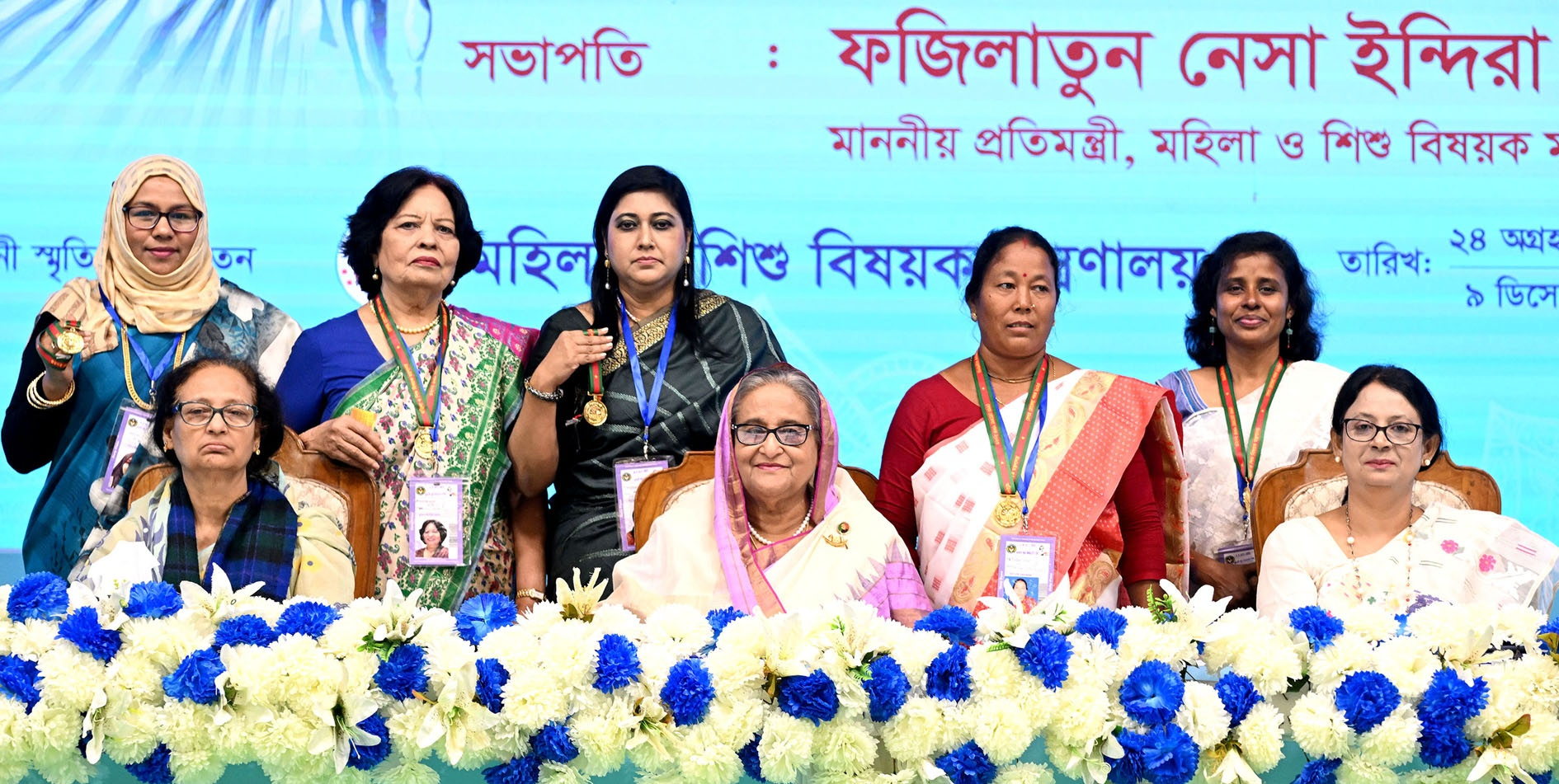
2023 winners

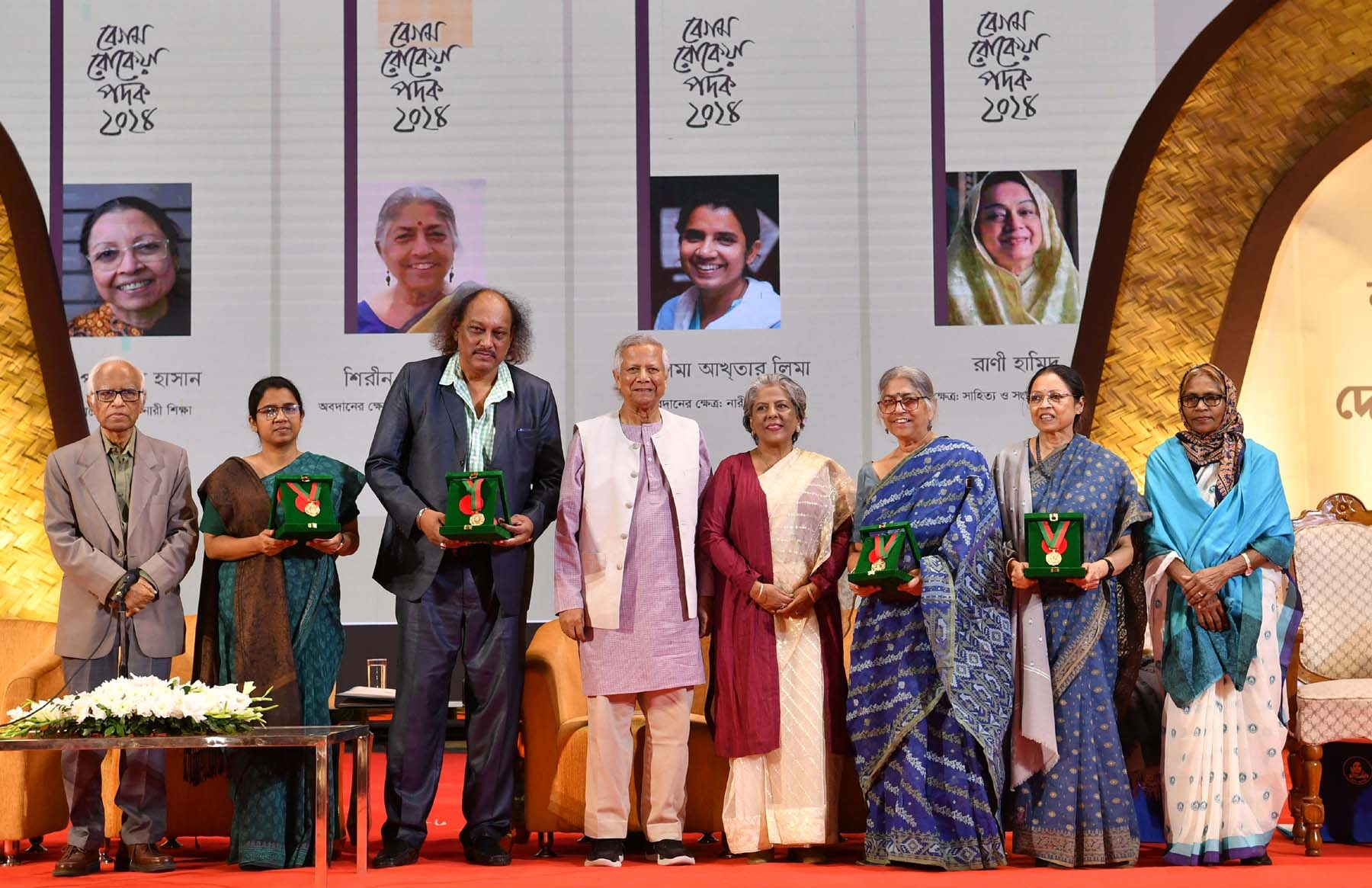
2024 winners

As of December 2020, 61 awards had been presented:

- 1995 – Shamsunnahar Mahmud
- 1996 – Sufia Kamal and Nilima Ibrahim
- 1997 – Nurjahan Begum
- 1999 – Angela Gomes, Setara Begum (Rahman), and Quazi Anwara Monsur
- 2001 – Hena Das, Maliha Khatun and Beggzadi Mahmuda Nasir
- 2002 – Akhtar Imam and Zohra Begum Kazi
- 2003 – Taiyaba Majumder and Maleka Ashraf
- 2004 – Begum Husna Banu Khanam and Dilara Chowdhury
- 2005 – Rokeya Mannan and Srimati Shaha
- 2007 – Latifa Akand and Hosne Ara Begum
- 2008 – Sultana Sarwat Ara Zaman and Nasrin Parvin Huq (posthumous)
- 2009 – Razia Hossain and Mamtaz Hossen
- 2010 – Meher Kabir and Ayesha Zafar
- 2011 – Begum Meherunnesa Khatun and Hamida Khanam
- 2012 – Mahfuza Khanam and Syeda Jebunnesa Haque
- 2013 – Hamida Banu and Jharna Dhara Chowdhury
- 2014 – Mamtaz Begum and Golap Banu
- 2015 – Bibi Russell and Taibun Nahar Rashid (posthumous)
- 2016 – Aroma Dutta and Begum Noorjahan
- 2017 – Mazeda Shawkat Ali, Baby Maudud (posthumous), Suraiya Rahman, Shobha Rani Tripura and Masuda Faruk Ratna
- 2018 – Zinnatunnessa Talukdar, Zohra Anis, Shila Roy, Rama Chowdhury (posthumous) and Rokeya Begum (posthumous)
- 2019 – Begum Selina Khalek, Shamsun Nahar, Papri Basu, Begum Akhtar Jahan and Nurun Nahar Faizannesa (posthumously).
- 2020 – Shireen Akhter, Brig Gen Nazma Begum, Monjulika Chakma, Begum Mushtari Shafi, and Farida Akter
- 2021 – Hasina Zakaria Bela, Archana Biswas, Shamsunnahar Rahman Paran (posthumous), Zinat Huda and Saria Sultana
- 2022 – Rahima Khatun, Kamrun Nahar Begum, Farida Yasmin, Afroza Parveen, and Nasima Begum.
- 2023 – Khaleda Ekram (posthumous), Halida Hanum Akhter, Kamrunnesa Ashraf Dina (posthumous), Ronita Bala, and Nishat Majumdar.
- 2024 – Rani Hamid, Perween Hasan, Shireen Huq, and Taslima Akhter.
- 2025 – Rubhana Rakib, Kalpona Akter, Nabila Idris, and Ritu Porna Chakma.

== See also ==
- List of awards for contributions to society
- List of awards honoring women
