= Nazma Begum =

Bangladesh Army Brigadier General

- Military career
- Allegiance: Bangladesh
- Branch: Bangladesh Army
- Service years: 1988-2025
- Rank: Brigadier General
- Unit: Army Medical Corps
- Commands: Head(Health Management) of CMH, Dhaka; Commandant of CMH, Savar; Commandant of Army Medical Corps Centre and School
- Conflicts: MINUSCA; UNOCI
- Awards: full list

Nazma Begum is a retired brigadier general of the Bangladesh Army. She is the first Bangladeshi woman Brigadier General (Health Care Management) from Army medical Corps (GDMO). She was awarded Begum Rokeya Padak by the Government of Bangladesh in 2020.

== Career ==
Begum started her career in Bangladesh Army. Later, she worked in United Nations' Peacekeeping Army and served as a medical professional in Central African Republic. She holds several records in Bangladesh Army as well as UN Peacekeeping Army. She became the first female assistant director of medical services in UN Peacekeeping Army's history. She is also the only woman in the history who was the country head twice. She is also the first woman in the history of the Bangladesh Air force who commanded the medical squadron twice.

Begum served the United Nations Operation in Côte d'Ivoire (UNOCI) from February 2016 until August 2016 as the first female contingent commander in UNOCI's history.

== Awards ==
- Military Gender Advocate Award (2016, 2019)
- Begum Rokeya Padak (2020)
