= Papri Basu =

Bangladeshi freedom fighter, teacher, social worker and women rights activist

- Born: 2 March 1956 (age 70); Comilla, Bangladesh
- Education: Chittagong University
- Awards: Begum Rokeya Padak (2019)

Papri Basu is a Bangladeshi freedom fighter, teacher, social worker and women's rights activist. She was awarded Begum Rokeya Padak in 2019.

== Biography ==
Basu was born on 2 March 1956 in Comilla to Pramath Chandra Dhar and Maya Dhar. When she was in class 8 she led a protest to remove a textbook from the curriculum against the Pakistan government. She also went on a hunger strike in front of the Comilla Education Board which was part of their protest.

When the Liberation War of Bangladesh started, Basu crossed the border and went to Tripura. She and others formed a cultural organization. They performed and earned money, which was donated for the treatment of injured freedom fighters.

Basu's uncle Neetish Roy Chowdhury was a correspondent for Akashvani. She helped her uncle to edit news and also wrote articles. Her article Manobikotar Proshne Indiraji was published in Anandabazar Patrika.

After liberation, Basu came back to Bangladesh. She passed her matriculation examination in 1972. After that she passed her higher secondary examination in 1974 from Comilla Government Women's College. She was then admitted into Chittagong University. She completed her graduate and postgraduate studies there. After that she joined Ispahani Public School & College, Comilla as a teacher. Later, she quit her job and began to work for the welfare of the society. She served as the vice president of Family Planning Association Bangladesh. She also worked for women's rights.

Basu received Begum Rokeya Padak in 2019 for her contribution to establish women's rights.
