= Amalendu De =

Guru Nanak Professor of History at Jadavpur University

- অমলেন্দু দে
- Born: 12 March 1929; Madaripur, Bengal Presidency, British India
- Died: 16 May 2014 (aged 85); Kolkata, India
- Education: Calcutta University
- Occupations: teacher, writer, historian
- Organizations: Jadavpur University; Asiatic Society (General secretary); Indian History Congress (president in 1982)
- Spouse: Naseema Banu
- Parents: Gopal Chandra De (father); Phoolkumari Devi (mother)
- Awards: Annadashankar Puraskar

Amalendu De (1929–16 May 2014) was Guru Nanak Professor of History at Jadavpur University, where he specialised in the history of the Indian independence movement. He served for some time as president and as secretary of the Asiatic Society and in 1982 was president of the Indian History Congress at its meeting in Aligarh.

== Early life ==
De was the son of a lawyer, born at Madaripur, Faridpur district, Bengal British India (now in Bangladesh) in 1929. From the age of 16 he was educated in Calcutta, ultimately studying at post-graduate level at the Calcutta University. He taught at Uluberia College and Murlidhar College before joining the faculty at Jadavpur University.

== Career ==
De was appalled that his country had been divided on religious lines. He was a Marxist historian and a humanist, promoting the ideals of a society without communal divisions. He supported closer ties between India and China, and was general-secretary of the West Bengal branch of the Indo-China Friendship Society. A Hindu, he married Nasima Banu, a Muslim and the granddaughter of A. K. Fazlul Huq, after completing his post-graduate studies. The inter-religious nature of the marriage made it difficult for them to obtain accommodation at that time.

De served for some time as president and as secretary of the Asiatic Society and in 1982 was President of the Indian History Congress at its meeting in Aligarh, Uttar Pradesh.

Awarded a D. Litt. by Jadavpur University, De was involved with Calcutta University National Integration Centre, the Dara Sikoh-Ram-mohan Society, and other organisations through which he voiced his desire for communal harmony. He was also involved with the state heritage commission, the road renaming committee and some other bodies. His work led to the discovery in Sodepur of the grave of Rokeya Sakhawat Hossain, a pioneering Indian rationalist thinker and human rights activist.

A festschrift in honour of De was published in 2009, titled Reflections in History: Essays in Honour of Professor Amalendu De. He died on 16 May 2014; his wife died a few weeks later, on 3 June. His remains were donated to R. G. Kar Medical College.

== Works ==
De wrote the first book documenting the 1938 visit of an Indian medical team to China. Among his other writings were books about the Anushilan Samiti, the origins of separatism in 19th-century Bengal, and a history of the Khaksar movement titled History of the Khaksar Movement in India, 1931–1947 (2009).

Aside from his books, De contributed to scholarly journals. His 1994 monograph on the subject of the growth of Islamic fundamentalism in India, titled Prasanga Anuprabesh (Essays on Infiltration), was subject to much criticism from supporters of Communism and other left-wing ideologies, as well as from Islamic radicals. He argued that the rise of small pockets of jihadists around the border with Bangladesh might eventually lead to major security problems and he was in particular critical of the rise of unregistered madrassas. He had to settle for publication by a small publisher and was accused by his opponents of facilitating the Hindutva agenda of the Bharatiya Janata Party in West Bengal. He continued to speak on the topic.
