= Sayeda Motahera Banu =

Bangladeshi academic

Sayeda Motahera Banu is a Bangladesh writer and winner of the Independence Day Award in 2001, the highest civilian award in Bangladesh, for her contribution to literature in Bangladesh. In 2020, she was appointed to the Board of Trustees of Nazrul Institute.
