= Sadya Afreen Mallick =

Bangladeshi singer and journalist

- সাদিয়া আফরীন মল্লিক
- Occupations: Singer, journalist
- Mother: Nurun Nahar Faizannesa

Sadya Afreen Mallick is a Bangladeshi singer and journalist. She is an exhibitor of Nazrul Sangeet. She is editor of the Arts and Entertainment section of The Daily Star.

== Background and career ==
Mallick was born to Syed Moqsud Ali and Nurun Nahar Faizannesa, both professors of the University of Dhaka. She was a child artiste to perform live when Bangladesh Television was launched 1964. She was one of the early women entrepreneurs in block printing. Mallick accompanied singer Firoza Begum as a performer on a three-month tour of the US in 1990. Begum had also directed Mallick's Nazrul Sangeet album at His Master's Voice, India in 1992.

== Awards ==
- Chhayanaut Gold Medal (1974)
- Anandadhara Gold Medal (1986)
- Nazrul Award (2015)
