= Mushtari Shafi =

Bangladeshi writer (1938–2021)

- মুশতারী শফী
- Born: 15 January 1938; West Bengal, Bengal Presidency, British India
- Died: 20 December 2021 (aged 83); Dhaka, Bangladesh
- Occupation: Writer

Begum Mushtari Shafi (15 January 1938 – 20 December 2021) was a Bangladeshi writer, entrepreneur, women's leader and social organiser.

== Life and career ==
Shafi was born on 15 January 1938 in West Bengal of the then British India. Her ancestral home is in Faridpur District. Her father's workplace was in Kolkata during the time of her birth. She worked as a Shobdo Sainik at the Swadhin Bangla Betar Kendra during the Bangladesh Liberation War.

Shafi was selected an honorary fellow of Bangla Academy in 2016 for her contribution to the Bangladesh Liberation War.

Shafi died on 20 December 2021, at the age of 83 in Dhaka.

== Awards ==
- Anannya Literature Award (2017)
- Begum Rokeya Padak (2020)
