= Monjulika Chakma =

Manjulika Chakma
- মঞ্জুলিকা চাকমা
- Born: 26 October 1944 (age 81); Rangamati, Bengal Presidency, British India
- Awards: full list

Manjulika Chakma (born 26 October 1944) is a Bangladeshi crafts and weaving entrepreneur. She was awarded Begum Rokeya Padak in 2020 for her contribution to the socio-economic development.

== Background and career ==
Chakma was born on 26 October 1944 to Kali Ratan Khisha and Panchalata Khisha. She has 3 sisters and 3 brothers. She learnt weaving in her childhood from her mother.

In 1961, Chakma joined Shah Boys High School as a lecturer. She purchased two traditional looms in 1965 and started applying new weaving techniques. She founded Bain Textile, which has outlets in Rangamati, Cox's Bazar and Dhaka.

== Awards ==
- Begum Rokeya Padak (2020)
- Honorary Fellowship of Bangla Academy for crafts (2018)
- Bangladesh Buddhist Women's Foundation Award (2013)
- Anannya Top Ten Award (2005)
- Outstanding Woman in Business of the Year 2003
- Best Successful Woman Entrepreneur Award (2002)
- Shilu Abed Award (2001)
