= Kabi Nazrul Institute =

Bangladeshi institute for Nazrul Islam studies

Jatiya Kabi Nazrul Institute
- জাতীয় কবি নজরুল ইনস্টিটিউট
- Crest of Jatiya Kabi Nazrul Institute
- Formation: February 1985; 41 years ago
- Type: GO
- Headquarters: Kabi Bhaban
- Location: Dhanmondi, Dhaka, Bangladesh
- Coordinates: 23.754076°N 90.373390°E
- Executive Director: Latiful Islam Shibli
- Parent organization: Ministry of Cultural Affairs
- Website: nazrulinstitute.gov.bd

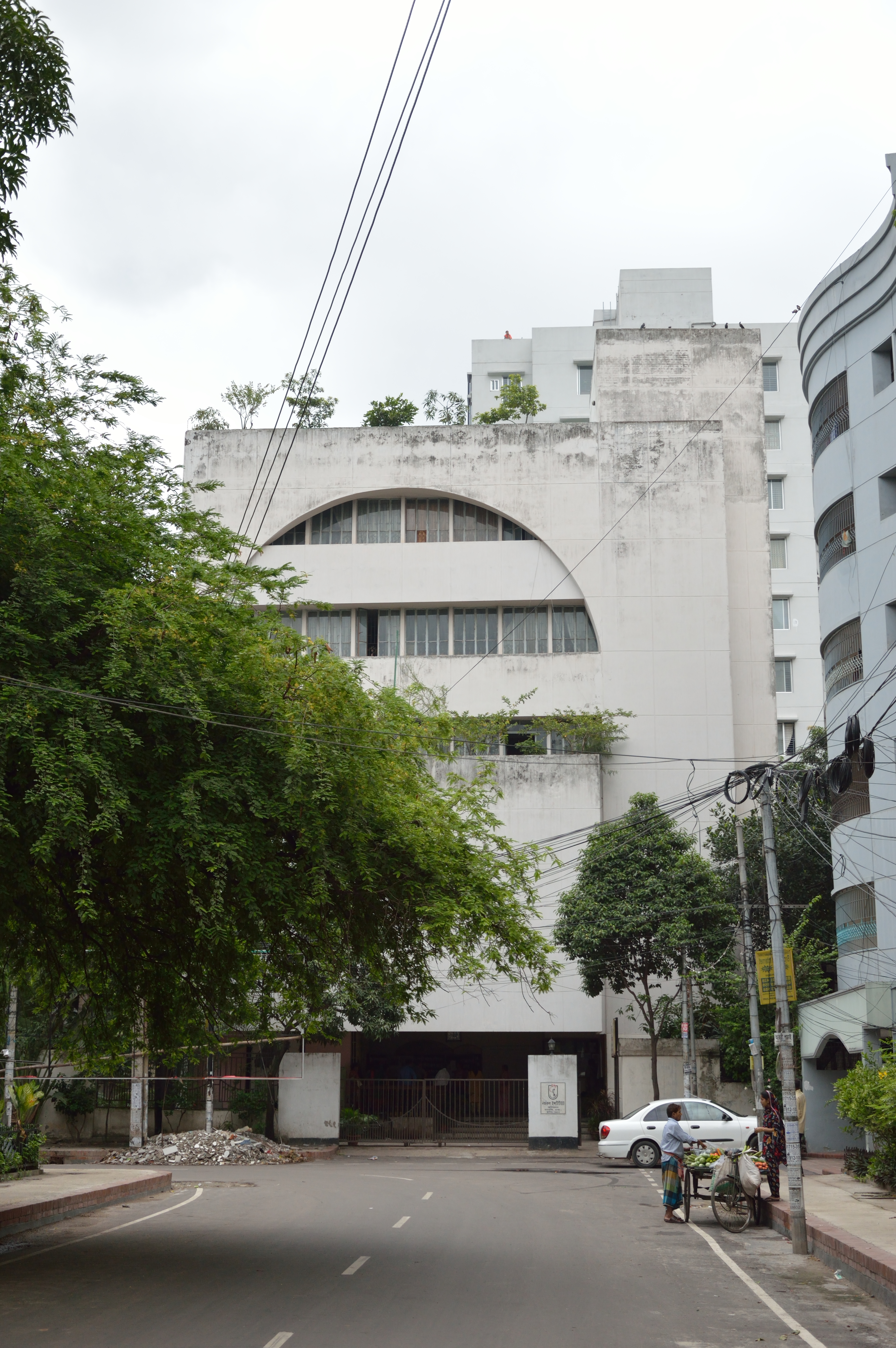
The headquarters of Nazrul Institute at Kabi Bhaban, Dhanmondi, Dhaka.

The Jatiya Kabi Nazrul Institute is Bangladesh's national institute, established in February 1985. Its headquarters are located in Kabi Bhaban in Dhanmondi, Dhaka, Bangladesh. It fulfills a number of roles; promoting the literary work of the poet Kazi Nazrul Islam, recognising excellence in literature research by conferring awards, and public engagement. In January 2025, it changed its name to Jatiya Kabi Nazrul Institute from Kabi Nazrul Institute.

== Structure and governance ==
The institute is headed by an executive director who has a trustee board to advise them. The first executive director of the institute was Mohammad Mahfuzullah and the first chairman of the trustee board was Mohammad Nasiruddin.

== Functions and activities ==
According to the Nazrul Institute Ordinance of 12 June 1984, the functions and objectives of the institute regarding the poet are:

1. Conduct study and research on the writings
2. Compile, preserve, edit and publish poems and songs
3. Organise discussion meetings, lectures, seminars, conferences
4. Run a library containing books on the poet's life, literature, music, records of his songs, tapes, films
5. Prepare musical notations and make gramophone records, tape records, films
6. Impart training in singing and reciting songs
7. Confer awards to scholars for outstanding research

The institute has preserved around 1,500 authentic Nazrul Geeti songs.

== Awards ==
Since 1985, the institute has been conferring two awards each year to dedicated Nazrul artistes and researchers.

=== Nazrul-Smriti Padak (1985–1988) ===
- 1985 – Zulfikar Haidar and Ataur Rahman
- 1986 – Rafiqul Islam
- 1987 – Karunamaya Goswami
- 1988 – Mohammad Nasiruddin

=== Nazrul Padak (1998–2006) ===
- 1998 – Firoza Begum
- 1999 – Sohrab Hossain and Sudhin Das
- 2000 – Khalid Hossain and Abdul Mannan Syed
- 2002 – Julhas Uddin Ahmed
- 2003 – Nilufar Yasmin
- 2004 – Ferdausi Rahman and Mohammad Mahfuzullah
- 2005 – Mohammad Rafikul Islam and Asadul Hoque
- 2006 – Rawshan Ara Mustafiz and Abdus Sattar

=== Nazrul Award (2007–present) ===
- 2007 – Ismat Ara and Mohammad Abdul Quayum
- 2008 – Nurjahan Begum and S. M. Ahsan Murshed
- 2009 – Razia Sultana and Shaheen Samad
- 2010 – Kabir Chowdhury and Nilima Das
- 2011 – Bedaruddin Ahmad and Jahangir Tareque
- 2012 – Anupam Hayat and MA Mannan
- 2013 – Khilkhil Kazi and Nashid Kamal
- 2014 – Serajul Islam Choudhury and Shabnam Mustari
- 2015 – Sadya Afreen Mallick and Abu Hena Abdul Awal
- 2016 – Fatema Tuz Zohra, Ferdous Ara and Leena Taposh Khan
- 2017 – Khairul Anam Shakil and Rashidun Nabi
- 2018 – Selina Hossain and Joseph Komol Rodrigues
- 2019 – Sayeda Motahera Banu and Dalia Nausheen
- 2020 – Gulshan Ara Kazi and Yakub Ali Khan
- 2021 – Kazi Mozammel Hossain and Yasmin Mustari
- 2022 – Idris Ali and Salahuddin Ahmed
- 2023 – Irshad Ahmed Shaheen and Rumi Ajnabi
- 2024 – Abdul Hye Sikder and Nasim Ahmed
