= Alokbortika =

Begum Rokeya Memorial Sculpture

- আলোকবর্তিকা (Bengali)
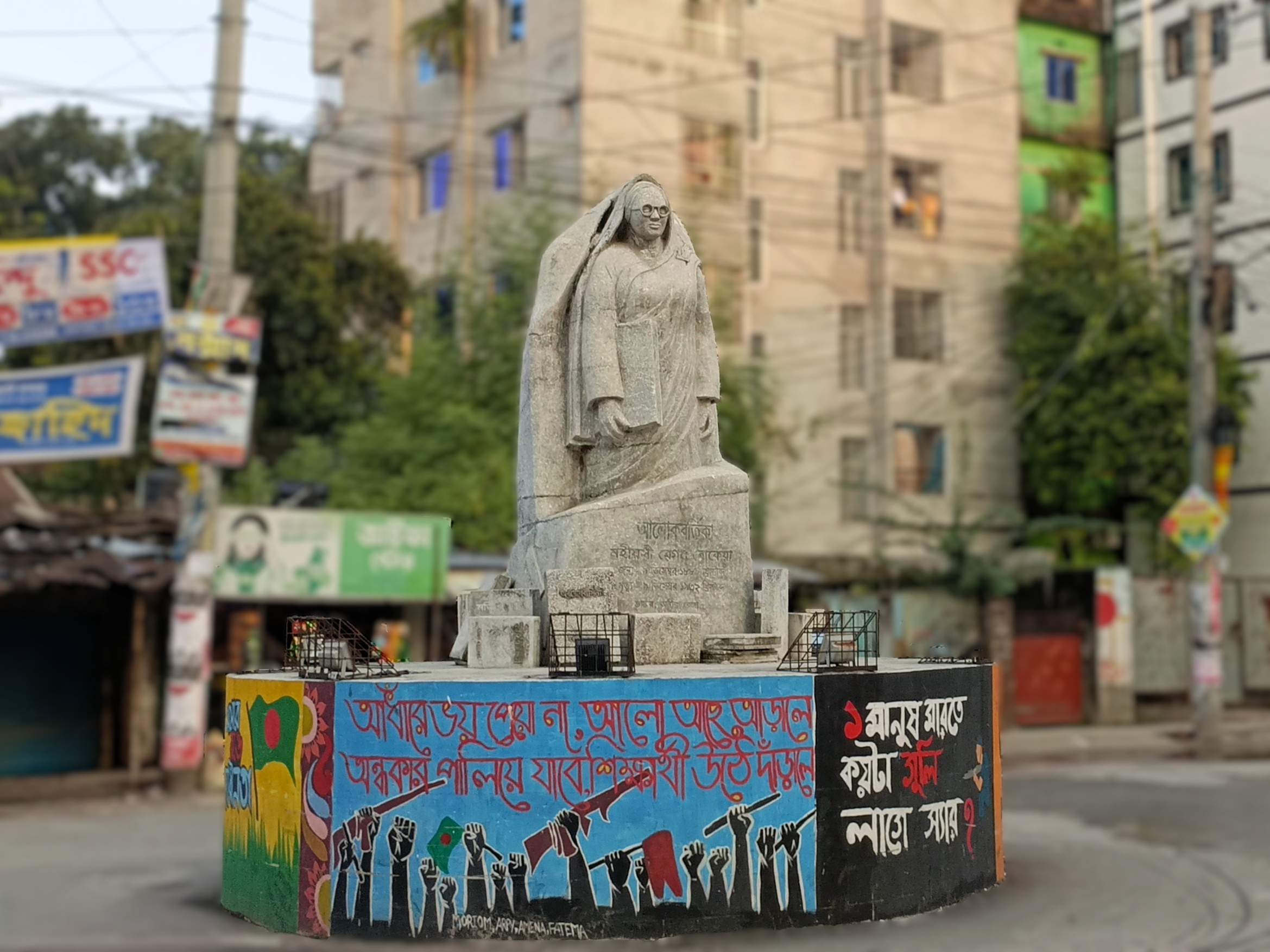
- 'Alokbortika' in 2025
- Artist: Aneek Reza
- Year: December 9, 2020; 5 years ago
- Medium: concrete
- Subject: Begum Rokeya
- Dimensions: 6.1 m (20 feet)
- Location: Rangpur
- 25°44′57.2″N 89°15′39.5″E
- Owner: Rangpur City Corporation

Alokbortika (Bengali: আলোকবর্তিকা, lit. 'torch bearer') is a commemorative sculpture of Begum Rokeya. It is located at Shalbon Indra crossing, next to Begum Rokeya Government College in Rangpur city. The sculpture was officially unveiled on December 9, 2020, on Rokeya Day. Created by Aneek Reza, the sculpture primarily depicts life-size statue Begum Rokeya. Constructed with independent funding, the sculpture is maintained by the Rangpur City Corporation. It serves as one of the main venues for various programs celebrating Rokeya Day.

== History ==
November 7 in 2016, the construction work of the statue at Indra's crossing officially began. After building the pedestal and a few brick columns, there was a long pause in the work. After a three-year hiatus, Aneek Reza completed the statue in 2020. In the same year, it was officially inaugurated on Rokeya Day. The construction cost amounted to 1.5 million Taka.

== Description ==
Alokbortika is a 50-square-foot sculpture. Made of brick and concrete, the height of the statue is 20 feet from the ground. The sculpture depicts Begum Rokeya emerging from within the stone with a book in hand in a standing posture. Her emerging from the solid stone symbolizes Begum Rokeya's rise with the power of education to transform society. On the pedestal, Rokeya's figure is 12 feet in height. At the front of the pedestal, there is an inscription with her birth and death years along with a quote. At the base of the circular pedestal, surrounding Rokeya, are the names of her various books and periodicals.
