= Syeda Jebunnesa Haque =

Bangladeshi politician

Member of Parliament for Reserved Women's Seat–35
- In office 25 January 2009 – 24 January 2014

Personal details
- Born: 1 February 1944 (age 82)
- Party: Bangladesh Awami League

Syeda Jebunnesa Haque (born 1 February 1944) is a Bangladesh Awami League politician. She served as a Jatiya Sangsad member representing the Reserved Women's Seat–35 during 2009–2014.

Haque was awarded Begum Rokeya Padak by the Government of Bangladesh in 2012.

== Attack ==
On 24 December 2004, a grenade attack was launched at the residence of Haque, the then president of District Mohila Awami League, while a meeting of the committee was being conducted. The house was in Sylhet City's Tantipara area. Eight leaders and activists were injured.

== Personal life ==
Haque is married to Enamul Haque, also a leader of the district Awami League.
