= Baby Maudud =

Bangladeshi politician

- বেবী মওদুদ

Member of the Bangladesh Parliament for Reserved Women's Seat–50
- In office 9 December 2011 – 24 January 2014
- Preceded by: Position created

Personal details
- Born: Mahfuza Khatun Baby Maudud; 23 June 1948 Kolkata, West Bengal, India
- Died: 25 July 2014 (aged 66) Dhaka, Bangladesh
- Party: Bangladesh Awami League
- Spouse: Md Hasan Ali (m. 1972; died 1984)
- Education: University of Dhaka
- Occupation: Journalist, politician

AN Mahfuza Khatun (known as Baby Maudud; 23 June 1948 – 25 July 2014) was a Bangladeshi journalist, politician, and writer. She was selected as a member of Jatiya Sangsad from the Reserved Women's Seat-30 in December 2011 and served until January 2014.

== Biography ==
Maudud was born on 23 June 1948 in Kolkata, India to Hedayet-un-Nisa and Abdul Maudud, a justice. She was the third among six brothers and three sisters.

Maudud started working as a journalist in 1967, while a student at the University of Dhaka. Maudud took part in the 1969 mass upsurge and was engaged in political activities with Begum Sufia Kamal in 1971. She graduated with a degree in Bangla in 1971.

She married advocate Md Hasan Ali in 1972. Together they had two sons, Rabiul Hasan Avi and Shafiul Hassan Dipto. Her husband died in 1984.

During her career as a journalist, she worked for The Daily Ittefaq, the BBC, The Sangbad, and Weekly Bichitra. She was the chief news editor of the state-run news agency, Bangladesh Sangbad Sangstha (BSS). She served as the social affairs editor at bdnews24.com.

When, in 2011, the 15th amendment to the Bangladesh Constitution increased the number of seats in the Bangladesh Parliament by five additional seats reserved for women, Madud was one of the five women elected.

Maudud won Anannya Bishesh Shommanona in 2012. For her contributions to the advancement of women, she was posthumously awarded the Begum Rokeya Padak in 2017.

== Works ==
- Mone Mone
- Sheikh Mujiber Chhotobela
- Pabitro Rokeya Path
- Gonotanter Manoshkonna Sheikh Hasina
- Muktijoddhah Manik
- Bangabandhu Sheikh Mujib O Tar Paribar
