= Shobha Rani Tripura =

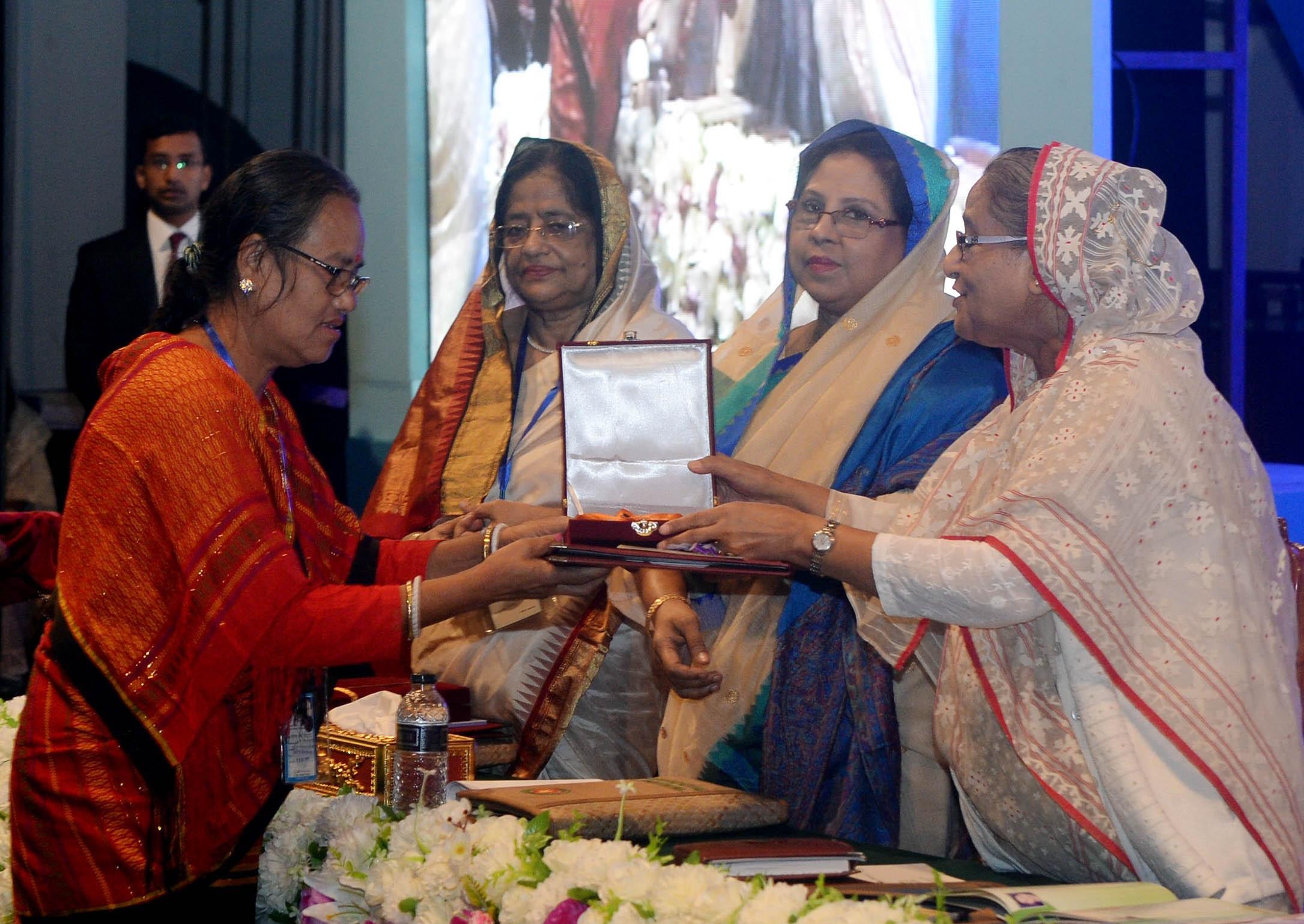
- Tripura receiving 2017 Begum Rokeya Padak
- Born: 2 February 1959 (age 67); Rangamati, Bangladesh
- Spouse: Mongsen Ching Monsin (m. 1984; died 2019)
- Children: 2
- Writing career
- Notable awards: Begum Rokeya Padak 2017

Shobha Rani Tripura (born 2 February 1959) is a Bangladeshi writer and teacher. She belongs to the Tripura community. She received Begum Rokeya Padak in 2017 from the Government of Bangladesh.

== Biography ==
Shobha Rani Tripura was born on 2 February 1959 in Rangamati. She lived in Mahalchari Khagrachari due to her father's employment. From the childhood, she fond of writing and she started writing. She is one of the intellectual person from her community, Tripura Race. Apart from indigenous lifestyle, She has written short stories, poems, plays, essays, travel stories, songs, novels etc. Writing has become the passion for her. In her various writings, she wrote about both hill people and plain people. In 1966, while studying in the first year of Khagrachhari Government College, she got a job as a teacher. She used to engage in teaching

She has written numerous books on hill people. She has written short stories, novels and plays too. She was the headmistress of Choungrachharhi Government Primary School. Shobha Rani Tripura is one of the Reang bloodline.

Shobha Rani Tripura married Mongsen Ching Monsin in 1984. He received Ekushey Padak in 2016. They had two daughters.

Shobha Rani Tripura received Begum Rokeya Padak in 2017.

== Awards ==
Awards
Bengali title	Transliterated title	Translated title	Year	Award Given By
শ্রেষ্ঠ শিক্ষিকা	Shresto Sikkhika	Best Female Teacher	1985, 1986, 2000	Government of Bangladesh
রাঙামাটি বনভূমি সাহিত্য পুরস্কার	Rangamati Bonobhumi Sahitto Puroshkar	Rangamati Forest Literature Award	1985	Rangamati Hill District
উপজাতীয় রূপকথা	Upajatio Rupkotha	Tribal Folkare	1980,1985	Rangamati Tribal Cultural Institute
সৈয়দ ইসমাইল হোসেন সিরাজী পদক	Syed Ismail Hossain Siraji Padak	Syed Ismail Hossain Siraji Award	2013	Sirajganj World Bangla Literature Festival
সম্মাননা সনদ	Sommanona Sonod	Certificate of Honor	2013	Bangladesh Indigenous Forum
ছায়ানীড় স্মারক সম্মাননা	Chayanir Sarok Sommanona	Shady Memorial Honors	2014	Khagrachhari District
রাহিলা সাহিত্য পুরস্কার	Rahila Sahitya Puraskar	Rahila Literature Award	2014	Murshidabad Rahila Sanskriti Sangha, West Bengal
কবি নজরুল স্মারক সম্মাননা	Kabi Nazrul Sommanona Sarok	Poet Nazrul Memorial Award	2014	Paschimbanga Bangla Akademi, West Bengal
শ্রেষ্ঠ জয়িতা	Shresto Jayita	Best Winner	2016	Ministry of Women and Children Affairs, Bangladesh
শ্রেষ্ঠ জয়িতা	Shresto Jayita	Best Winner	2016	Ministry of Women and Children Affairs, Bangladesh
বেগম রোকেয়া পদক	Begum Rokeya Padak	Begum Rokeya Padak	2017	Prime Minister of Bangladesh

== Books ==
Original Works in Bengali
Bengali title	Transliterated title	Translated title	Year
ঝরাপাতা	Jhora Pata	Fallen leaves	1996
ত্রিপুরা জাতির ইতিকথা	Tripura Jatir Kotha	Story of Tripura Race	2001
ত্রিপুরা জাতির রূপকথা	Tripura Jatir Rupkotha	Tale of Tripura Race	2002
জাতক (বুদ্ধ)	Jatok(Buddha)	Horosscope Buddha	2004
ত্রিপুরা জাতি	Triprua Jati	Tripura Race	2007
ত্রিপুরা জাতির ইতিবৃত্ত	Tripuraa Jatir Itibritto	History of Triprua Race	2012
আলোময়ীমা ত্রিপুরেশ্বরী	Alomioma Tripureshari	Alomayima Tripureshwari	2012
শুভ বাংলা নববর্ষ	Shuvo Bangla Noborborsho	Happy Bangla New Year	2012
বপ্নের ধূসর ছায়া	Shopner Dhushor Chaya	The gray shadow of the dream	2013
রাখাইন ও ত্রিপুরা জাতিসত্তা	Raikhaine o Tripura Jatisotta	Raikhaine and Tripura Race	2014
ধূসর পাহাড়ে সবুজ তারুণ্	Dhushor pahare Sobuj Tarun	Green youth in gray hills	2014
ত্রিপুরা জাতির কিংবদন্তী	Tripura Jatir Kingbodonti	The legend of the Tripura Nation	2014
একুশের অপরাজিত কথামালা	Ekushey Oparajita Kothamala	Ekushey's unbeaten story	2014
গিরি নন্দিনী	Giri Nondini		2014
