= Sultana Zaman (psychologist) =

Bangladeshi psychologist (1932–2020)

- সুলতানা জামান
- Born: 9 June 1932; Paksey, Bangladesh
- Died: 22 March 2020 (aged 87); Dhaka, Bangladesh
- Education: Ph.D.
- Alma mater: University of Dhaka; Emory University
- Occupations: Academic, psychologist, philanthropist
- Spouse: Kazi Nuruzzaman
- Relatives: Jamal Nazrul Islam (brother)

Sultana Zaman (9 June 1932 – 22 March 2020) was a Bangladeshi psychologist, academic, and philanthropist. She was the founder of Bangladesh Protibandhi Foundation (BPF), an organization for mentally disabled people. She was awarded the Begum Rokeya Padak in 2008 by the government of Bangladesh.

== Education and career ==
Zaman started her college education late in life, specializing in psychology, and started working with the intellectually disabled in 1973. She completed her B.A. and M.A. degrees at the University of Dhaka. She earned her Ph.D. from Emory University in 1975. She was a faculty member in the psychology department of the University of Dhaka for 33 years and a professor from 1975 to 2000. She was a visiting professor in the Department of Special Education at the University of Manchester for four months from April 1992. She was made professor emeritus in September 2008 at the University of Dhaka.

== Working with the disabled ==
In 1972, Zaman established a school, Deepshikha Vidyalaya, for disadvantaged children and women. She founded an organization for mentally disabled people, Bangladesh Protibandhi Foundation, and a school, Kalyani, in 1984. She helped establish the Department of Special Education at the Institute of Education and Research (IER) and the University of Dhaka in 1993 — the first of its kind at the university level in Bangladesh and the first of its kind to offer B.S.Ed. and M.S.Ed. degrees in special education.

== Awards ==
- Henry H. Kessler Award (1996)
- Rotary International Award "Women for Women,"
- Anannya
- Bangladesh Scouts
- Autism Welfare Foundation (2000)
- IER Award (2003)
- Agradoot Award (2008)
- Begum Rokeya Padak (2008)

== Personal life ==
Zaman was married to Bir Uttom Lieutenant colonel Kazi Nuruzzaman, the sector commander at the sector 7 of Bangladesh Liberation War. Her brother Jamal Nazrul Islam was a physicist.

== Death ==
Zaman died on 22 March 2020.
