= Nabanoor =

Bengali literary magazine

Nabanoor was a monthly Bengali literary magazine published from Kolkata. It was a progressive magazine that encouraged contribution by both male and female authors.

== History ==
Nabanoor was a monthly magazine which started publication in 1903 in Kolkata, Bengal Presidency, British India. The first editor of the magazine was Syed Emdad Ali. The magazine wanted to encourage literary traditions in the Bengali Muslim community. Notable contributors to the magazine included Qazi Imdadul Haq and Taslimuddin Ahmad. It continued to publish till December 1906 when it was closed down. The magazine wrote on issues affecting the Muslim community. It also included articles by Muslim women and Bengali Hindus. Begum Rokeya started her literary career by writing for this magazine.

According to Leela Fernandes in the book Routledge Handbook of Gender in South Asia, articles published in the Nabanoor showed a growing divide between the Muslim Bengali and Hindu Bengali community. The two communities accused each other of being against women empowerment. Begum Rokeya published a number of articles on women empowerment in the magazine. Her article Amader Oboniti (our downfall) in 1904 which described jewelry as symbols of enslavement. Her article drew widespread criticism of Muslim men and women.
