= Ferdous Ara =

Bangladeshi singer

Ferdous Ara ফেরদৌস আরা
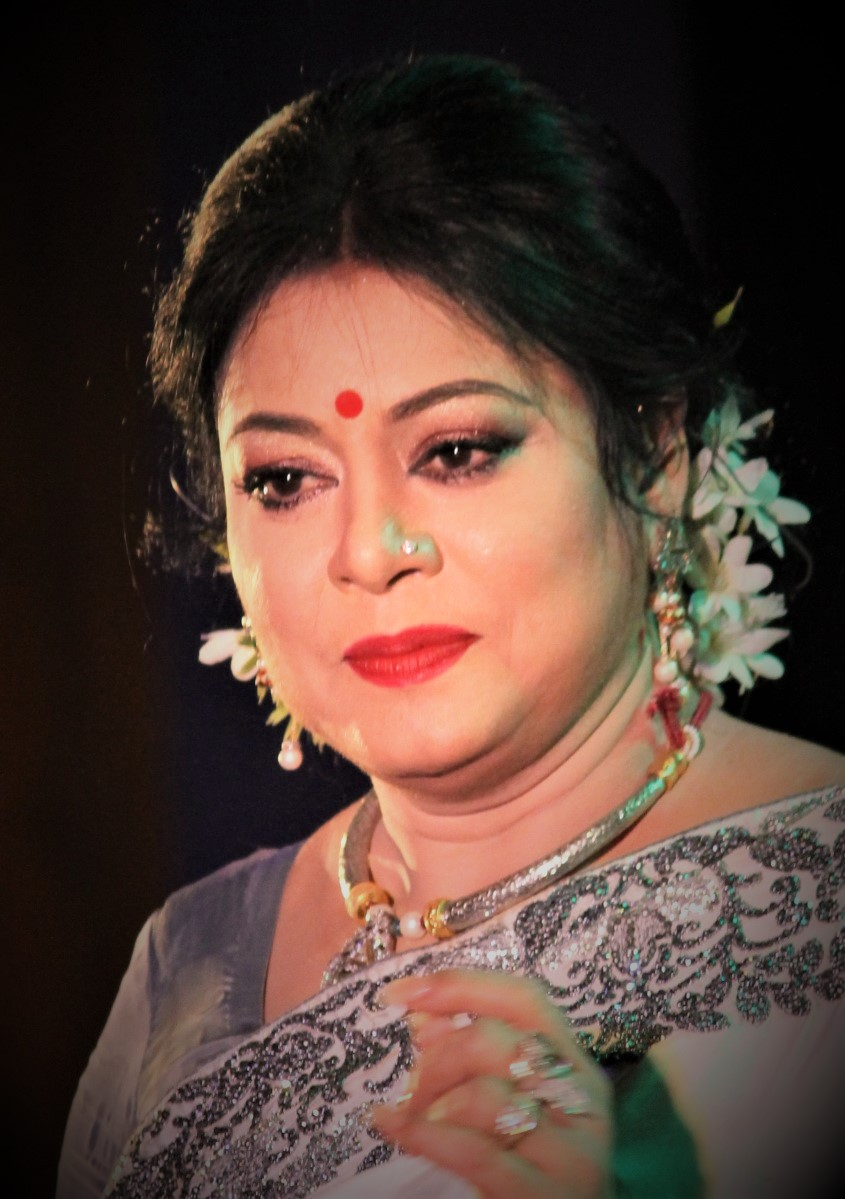
- Ara in 2017

Background information
- Born: Brahmanbaria
- Genres: Nazrul Geeti; Patriotic; Adhunik
- Instrument: Vocals
- Years active: 1973–present

Ferdous Ara is a Bangladeshi Nazrul Sangeet singer and winner of the Ekushey Padak, the second highest civilian award in Bangladesh.

== Early life and education ==
Ara, nicknamed Marine, was born in Brahmanbaria District to A.H.M. Abdul Hai, a classical singer of the early 1950s, and Mosharrefa Begum. She has three sisters, Jannat Ara, Nur-e-Jannat and Hur-e-Jannat. She completed her bachelor's and master's in History from the University of Dhaka.

== Career ==
In 1973, Ara started her career as a regular vocal artist in Bangladesh Radio and afterward in Bangladesh Television. She has released numerous albums of Nazrul Sangeet, contemporary and patriotic songs. In 1985, her first album was released by SARGAM. She became the first person in Bangladesh whose music video of Nazrul Sangeet was released.

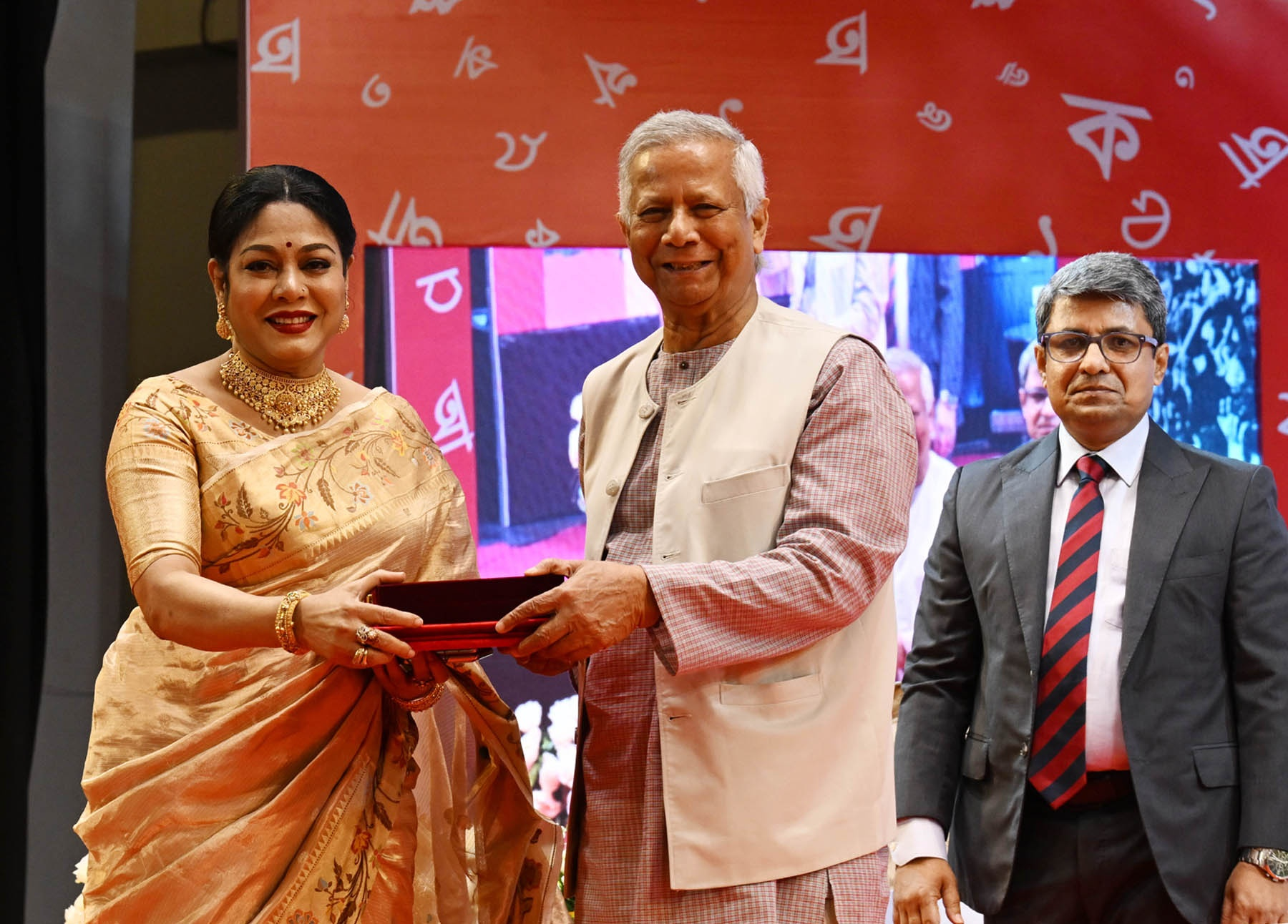
Ferdous Ara accepting the Ekushay Padak in 2025 from Chief Advisor Muhammad Yunus.

Ara teaches Nazrul songs at the Nazrul Institute, University of Dhaka and Dhaka Music College. She founded a music school, Sur Saptak in 2000. She contributed as a background vocal in films, documentaries, and drama. She sang in a movie titled Meher Nigar by Impress Telefilm.

Ara sang at the Gala Concert at Royal Albert Hall, London on an invitation of Inner London Education Authority in 1986. She also performed in Bangladesh Shilpakala Academy.

Ara authored the books Sangeet Bhubaney Nazrul (Nazrul in Music World) and Sanchitar Katha Barta (Conversation of Sanchita). She also hosts Sanchita on Channel i and Ei Shomoy on nTV, both are television programs about Nazrul.

== Albums ==
- First tape with 12 Nazrul songs, Sargam (1985)
- Long play and tape, Nazrul Institute (1986) (Nazrul geeti)
- Shaon-A-Rathe, His Master's Voice (Nazrul geeti) (1999)
- Tumi Ashley Jey Ki Bhalo Lagey, Saregama (Nazrul and Modern songs mixed album)
- Tumi Ki Dokhina Pobon, Saregama (2005)

== Personal life ==
Ara is married to Rafiqul Mohammed, a government officer(retired 2018). Together they have a son, Faisal Mohammed who was designated as one of the first Bangladeshi Sexton Scholar in the field of Electrical Engineering from Dalhousie University, Canada (2016/2017) and a daughter, Fahmi Ferdous.

== Awards ==
- Bachsas Award
- TRAB Award
- Shilpacharya Zainul Abedin Gold Medal
- Channel I Lifetime Achievement Award
- Nazrul Award (2017)
- Channel i Music Lifetime Achievement Awards 2024
