= Hosne Ara Begum =

Bangladeshi politician

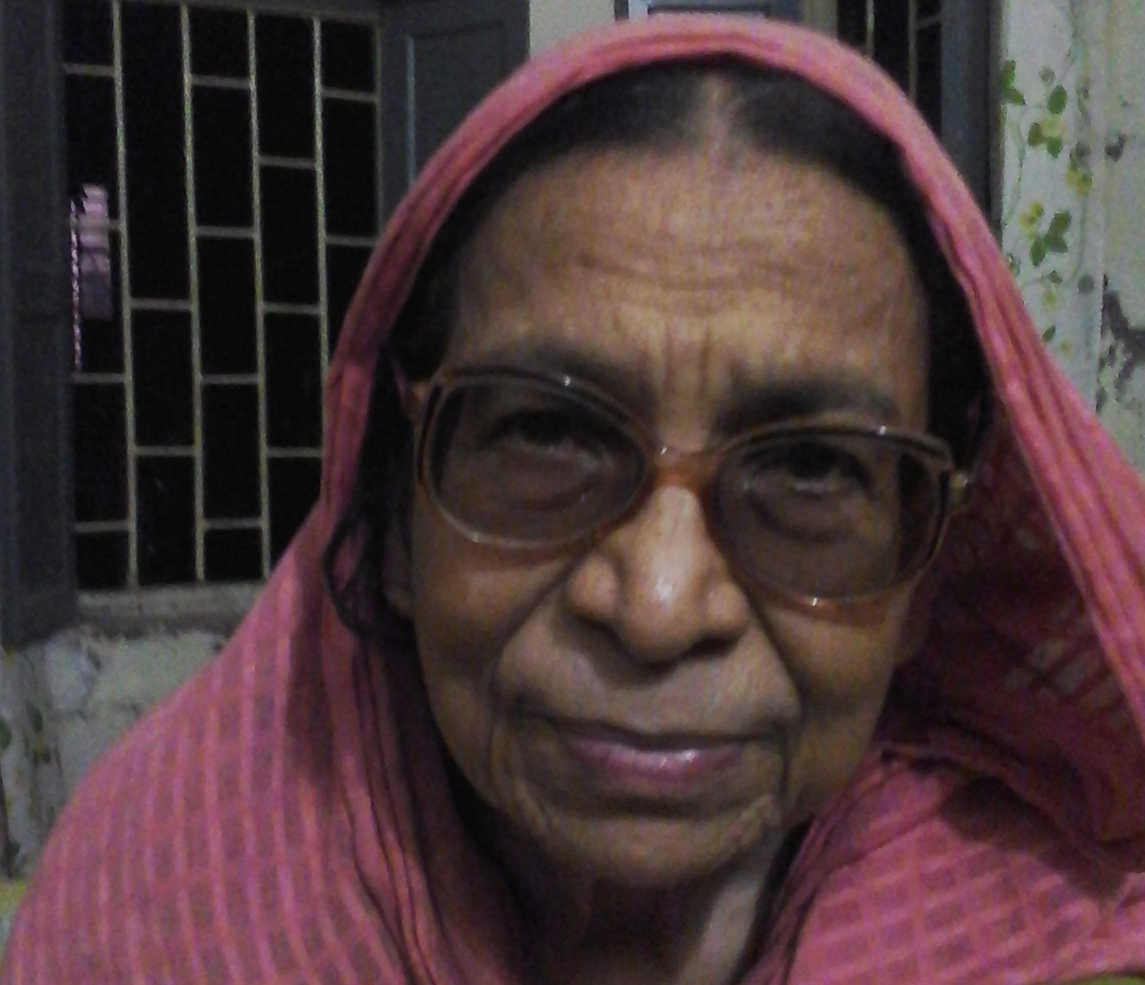

Member of Bangladesh Parliament
- In office 10 April 2014 – 30 December 2018

Personal details
- Born: 31 December 1965 (age 59)
- Political party: Bangladesh Awami League

Hosne Ara Begum (Bengali: হোসনে আরা বেগম) is a Bangladesh Awami League politician and a former member of the Bangladesh Parliament from reserved seat no.-37.

== Career ==
Begum was elected to parliament from a reserved seat as a Bangladesh Awami League candidate in 2014.
