= Taslimuddin Ahmad =

Khan Bahadur Taslimuddin Ahmad
- তসলীমুদ্দীন আহমদ

Personal details
- Born: 30 April 1852 Darjeeling, Bengal Presidency
- Died: 24 March 1927 (aged 74) Munshipara, Rangpur district, Bengal Presidency
- Relatives: Mir Jumla II

Khan Bahadur Maulvi Taslimuddin Ahmad CIE (Bengali: তসলীমুদ্দীন আহমদ; 30 April 1852 – 24 March 1927) was a Bengali lawyer, littérateur, politician and philanthropist. He is best known for translating the Qur'an into Bengali.

== Early life and education ==
Ahmad was born on 30 April 1852 in the city of Darjeeling, Bengal Presidency. He belonged to the Bengali Muslim Tea family from the village of Chandanbari in Jalpaiguri district (now in Panchagarh District, Bangladesh). He was the third child of revenue officer Monshi Mohamed Tarickoollah and the brother of prosaist Taherunnesa. His grandfather, Qazi Tajuddin Ahmad, was a judge, who traced his ancestry to Muhammad Daniyal, brother of Mughal general Mir Jumla II who settled in the village after power transferred from Cooch Behar to Mughal rule during the invasion of Cooch Behar and Assam. Ahmad married Naeemunnesa, with whom he had four sons including the renowned littérateur Talimuddin Ahmad alias Tareequl Islam (1889–1925).

Ahmad was educated at the Chandanbari Model School, and then received a scholarship to study at the Rangpur Zilla School where he completed his Entrance examination in 1873. He graduated from the University of Calcutta with a Bachelor of Arts in 1877 and Bachelor of Laws in 1882.

== Career ==
From 1883, Ahmed served as an attorney in the districts of Purnea, Darjeeling and Jalpaiguri. In 1889, he transferred to Rangpur. While in Calcutta for higher education, he became interested in literature. He and his friends published a monthly magazine called Islam. He also published Bengali translations of some Chapters of the Qur'an, including exegesis, in the magazine called Nabanoor. The objectives of the formation of the Rangpur Literary Society were the discovery of archaeological finds, research on language, culture and art, etc. The 3-volume translation of the Qur'an (1922–1925) was the greatest work of his life. Apart from this, his other books are:

- Tabarakallazi Surar Onubad - translation of Surah Al-Mulk (1906)
- Amparar Onubad - translation of 30th Juz' (1908)
- Priyo Poygomborer Priyo Kotha - Beloved Words of the Beloved Messenger - translation of Hadith (1915)
- Jonmotshob (Mawlud Nafisa) - Birthday Celebration (1925)
- Sahabiya - Companions (1926)
- Somrat Poygombor - Emperor Prophet (1928)
- Al-Hamra Ba Lohito Prasad - translation of the Tales of the Alhambra
- Jononur (translation of English book Genie)
- Sham Ba Siriya Bijoy - Conquest of the Levant or Syria
- Arobi Bekoron - Arabic grammar
- Moroner Pore - After death
- And many more

In addition to his literary work, Taslimuddin also gained fame as a social worker. He was a member of the old representative organizations of Rangpur, the "Rangpur Mohammedan Association" (1885), the "Rangpur Nur-al-Iman Jamaat" (1891) and the "Rangapur Sahitya Parisad" (1905).

The British government awarded him the title of Khan Bahadur in 1912 for his special contribution to social service.

== Death ==
Ahmad died on 24 March 1927 at his home in Munshipara, Rangpur, Bengal Presidency.
