= Begum Rokeya =

Bengali feminist writer and social reformer (1880–1932)

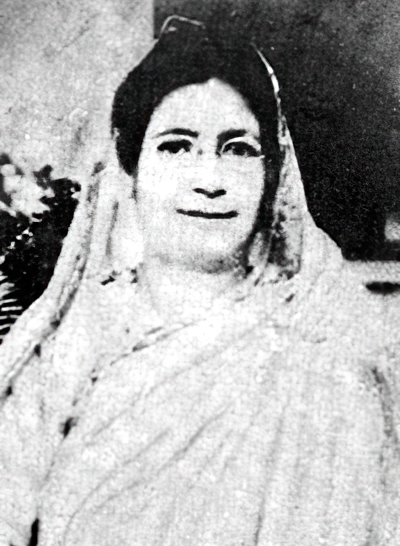
- Born: Rokeya Khatun; 9 December 1880; Pairaband, Bengal Presidency, British India
- Died: 9 December 1932 (aged 52); Calcutta, Bengal Presidency, British India
- Resting place: Kolkata, West Bengal, India
- Other names: Rokeya Sakhawat Hossain; R. S. Hossain; Rokeya Khatoon
- Occupations: Writer, feminist thinker, educator, activist
- Spouse: Khan Bahadur Sakhawat Hossain (m. 1898; died 1909)
- Relatives: Karimunnesa Khanam Chaudhurani (sister); Abdul Karim Ghaznavi (nephew); Abdul Halim Ghaznavi (nephew)

Rokeya Sakhawat Hossain (Note: Though "Rokeya Sakhawat Hossain" (a romanised form of her married name in Bengali: রোকেয়া সাখাওয়াত হোসেন") is the commonly used spelling of Rokeya's full married name, Rokeya herself is never seen to use her full married name in this English spelling. In much of her correspondence in English, she used just her initials: 'R. S. Hossein' (also used on the cover of the 1st edition of Sultana's Dream). In some other correspondences in English, she used "Rokeya Khatun", or "Khatoon". In most of her correspondence in Bengali, she used just her first name "রোকেয়া" (would be "Rokeya" if romanized).) (9 December 1880 (Note: Though Rokeya's birthday is celebrated along with her death anniversary on 9 December, her birthday is more conjecture than a fact as it was not documented.) – 9 December 1932), commonly known as Begum Rokeya, (Note: The honorific "Begum" is not a part of Hossain's name; it is added as a feminine title of respect, primarily in the Indian subcontinent.) was a prominent Bengali feminist thinker, writer, educator and political activist from British India. She is widely regarded as a pioneer of feminism in Bangladesh and India.

She advocated for men and women to be treated equally as rational beings, noting that the lack of education for women was responsible for their inferior economic position. Her major works include Matichur (A String of Sweet Pearls, 1904 and 1922), a two-volume collection of essays articulating her feminist ideas; Sultana's Dream (1905), a feminist science fiction novella set in Ladyland, a realm governed by women; Padmarag (Essence of the Lotus, 1924), portraying the struggles of Bengali wives; and Abarodhbasini (The Confined Women, 1931), a bold critique of the extreme purdah system that imperiled women's freedom and self-worth.

Rokeya held education to be the central precondition of women's liberation, establishing the first school aimed primarily at Muslim girls in Kolkata. She is said to have gone from house to house persuading the parents to send their girls to her school in Nisha. Until her death, she ran the school despite facing hostile criticism and social obstacles.

In 1916, she founded the Muslim Women's Association, an organization that fought for women's education and employment. In 1926, Rokeya presided over the Bengal Women's Education Conference convened in Kolkata, the first significant attempt to bring women together in support of women's education rights. She was engaged in debates and conferences regarding the advancement of women until her death on 9 December 1932, shortly after presiding over a session during the Indian Women's Conference.

Bangladesh observes Rokeya Day on 9 December every year to commemorate her works and legacy. On that day, the Bangladesh government also confers the Begum Rokeya Padak on individual women for their exceptional achievement. In 2004, Rokeya was ranked number 6 in the BBC's poll of the Greatest Bengali of all time.

== Background and family ==
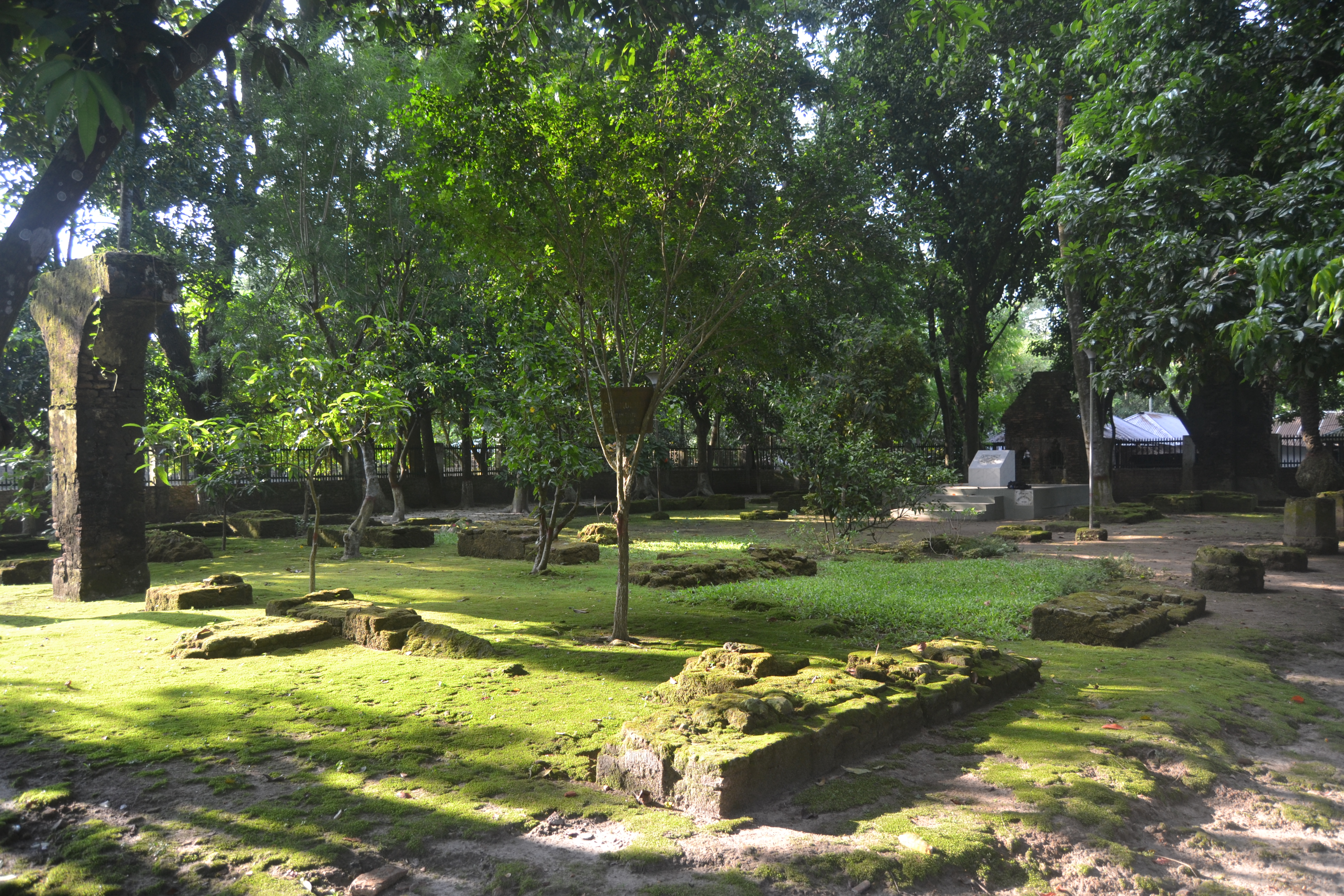
The remains of Rokeya's childhood house in Pairaband, Rangpur, pictured in 2012.

Rokeya was born in 1880 during the British Raj, to an aristocratic mixed Persian-Bengali Muslim family in the village of Pairaband, Rangpur, Bengal Presidency (now Rangpur, Bangladesh). Her ancestors had migrated from Tabriz in Iran to make their fortune in India and had established a zamindari in Rangpur, they had served in the military and judiciary during the Mughal regime. Her father, Zahiruddin Muhammad Abu Ali Haidar Saber, was a zamindar and a multilingual intellectual. He married four times; his marriage to Rahatunnessa Sabera Chaudhurani resulted in the birth of Rokeya, who had two sisters and three brothers, one of whom died in childhood. Rokeya's eldest brother Ibrahim Saber, and second brother Khalilur Rahman, her immediate elder sister Karimunnesa Khanam Chaudhurani, and Humaira Khatun (youngest sister). Saber and Karimunnesa both had a major influence on her life. Karimunnesa wanted to study Bengali, the language of the majority of Bengali people, against her family's wish, who preferred to use Arabic and Persian as the media of education and communication. Ibrahim taught English and Bengali to Rokeya and Karimunnesa. Karimunnesa married at the age of fourteen and later became a poetess. Both of her sons, Abdul Karim Ghaznavi and Abdul Halim Ghaznavi, became politicians and occupied ministerial portfolios under British authorities.

== Marriage ==
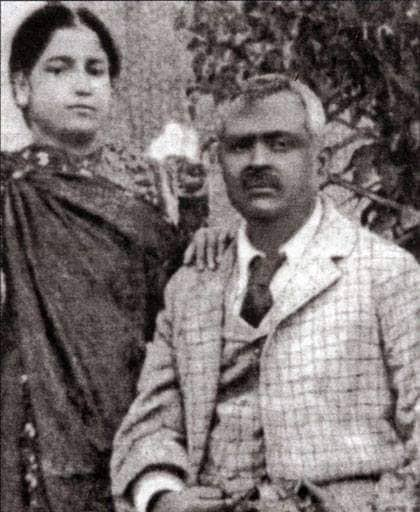
Rokeya with her husband, Sakhawat Hossain (1898)

Rokeya married at the age of 16, in 1898, to 38-year-old Khan Bahadur Sakhawat Hossain. He was an Urdu-speaking deputy magistrate of Bhagalpur (a present-day district of Bihar state). He earned his bachelor of agriculture degree from England and was a member of the Royal Agricultural Society of England. He married Rokeya after the death of his first wife. As a liberal, he encouraged Rokeya to continue learning Bengali and English. He also encouraged her to write, and on his advice, she adopted Bengali as the principal language for her literary works.

Rokeya wrote Sultana's Dream (1908) before her husband died in 1909. In Sultana's Dream, Rokeya reversed the roles of men and women in which women were the dominant sex and the men were subordinate and confined to the mardana (the male equivalent of the zenana). She also depicts an alternative, feminist vision of science, in which inventions such as solar ovens, flying cars, and cloud condensers are used to benefit the whole of society. It is regarded as a notable and influential satire. She wrote regularly for the Saogat, Mahammadi, Nabaprabha, Mahila, Bharatmahila, Al-Islam, Nawroz, Mahe Nao, Bangiya Musalman Sahitya Patrika, The Mussalman, Indian Ladies Magazine and others.

Five months after Rokeya's husband's death, she established a high school, naming it Sakhawat Memorial Girls' High School. It started in Bhagalpur, a traditionally Urdu-speaking area, with five students. A dispute with her husband's family over property forced her to move the school in 1911 to Calcutta, a Bengali-speaking area. She ran the school for 24 years.

Rokeya founded the Anjuman-e-Khawateen-e-Islam (Islamic Women's Association), which was active in holding debates and conferences regarding the status of women and education. She advocated reform, particularly for women, and believed that parochialism and excessive conservatism were principally responsible for the relatively slow development of Muslims in British India. Anjuman-e-Khawateen-e-Islam organised events for social reforms based on the original teachings of Islam that, according to her, were lost.

=== Literary style ===
Rokeya wrote in a number of genres: short stories, poems, essays, novels and satirical writings. She developed a distinctive literary style, characterised by creativity, logic and a wry sense of humour. She started writing in the Nabanoor from about 1903, under the name of Mrs R S Hossain. However, there is an opinion that her first published writing, Pipasa, appeared in the Nabaprabha in 1902. Her writings called upon women to protest against injustices and break the social barriers that discriminated against them.

== Novels written by Begum Rokeya ==
Whenever any woman tries to raise her head, weapons in the form of religions or holy scriptures strike her head. ... Men propagate those scriptures as God's commandments to subdue us in darkness. ... Those scriptures are nothing but systems constructed by men. The words we listen from male saints would be different if they were spoken by female saints. ... Religions only tighten the yoke of servitude around women and justify male domination over women.

— Rokeya in 1904
- Pipasha ("Thirst") (1902)
- Matichur 1st Vol. (Essays) (1904)
- Matichur 2nd Vol. (Essays) (1922)

The second volume includes stories and fairy tales:

- Saurajagat (The Solar System),
  - Delicia Hatya (translation of the Murder of Delicia – Marie Corelli)
  - Jnan-phal (The Fruit of Knowledge)
  - Nari-Srishti (Creation of Women)
  - Nurse Nelly
  - Mukti-phal (The Fruit of Emancipation)
- Sultana's Dream (1905)
- Padmarag ("Essence of the Lotus") (novel) (1924)
- Abarodhbasini ("The Secluded Women") (1931)
- Boligarto (short story)
- Narir Adhikar ("The Rights of Women"), an unfinished essay for the Islamic Women's Association
- God Gives, Man Robs (1927)
- Education Ideals for the Modern Indian Girl (1931)

== Death and legacy ==
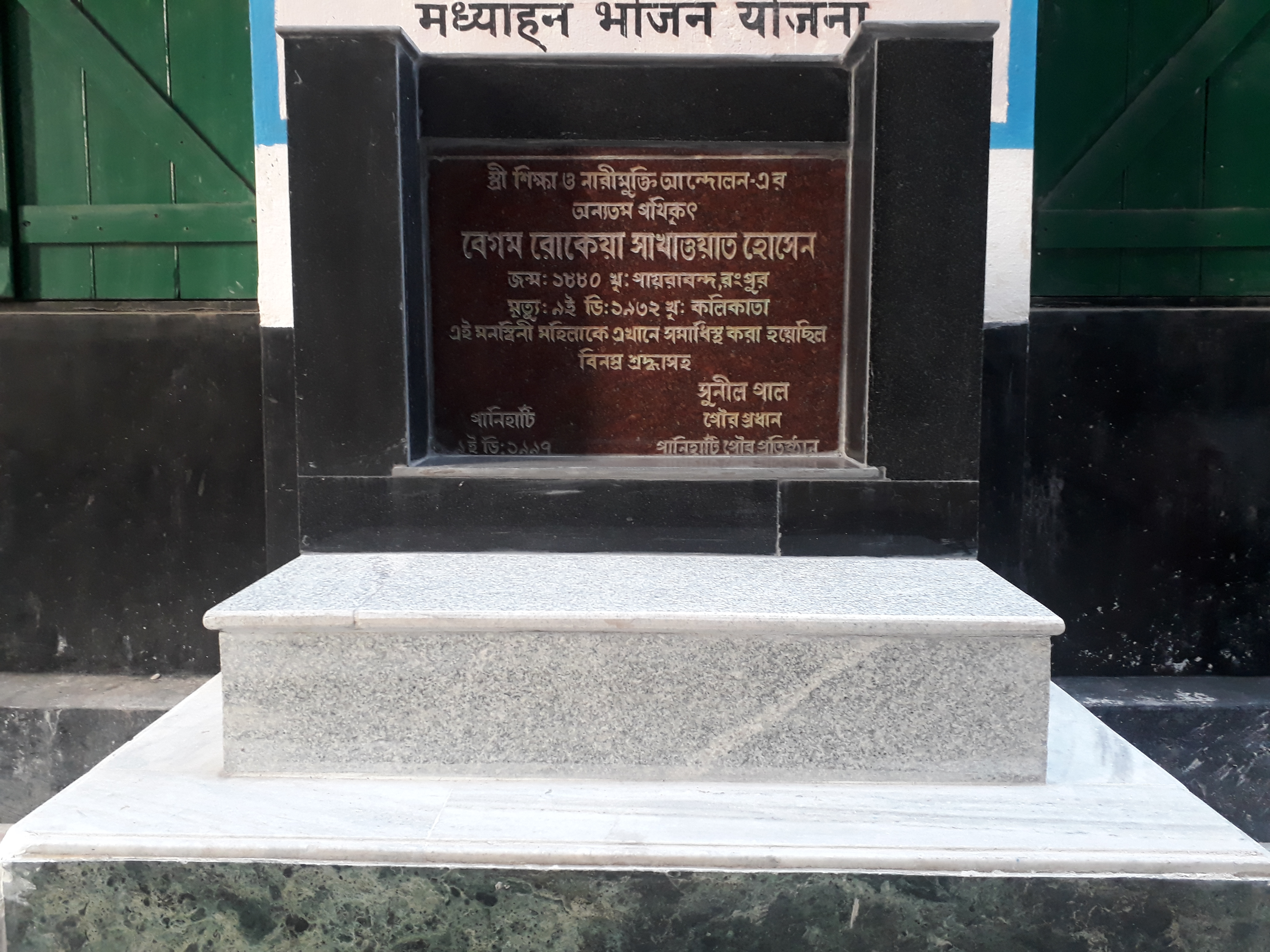
Tomb of Rokeya in the campus of Panihati Girls' High School, Sodepur.

Rokeya died of heart problems on 9 December 1932, on her 52nd birthday.

9 December is celebrated as the Rokeya Day in Bangladesh. On 9 December 2017, Google celebrated her 137th birthday, honoring her with a Google Doodle.

Rokeya's grave in Sodepur was rediscovered due to the efforts of the historian Amalendu De. It is located inside the campus of Panihati Girls' High School, Panihati, Sodepur.

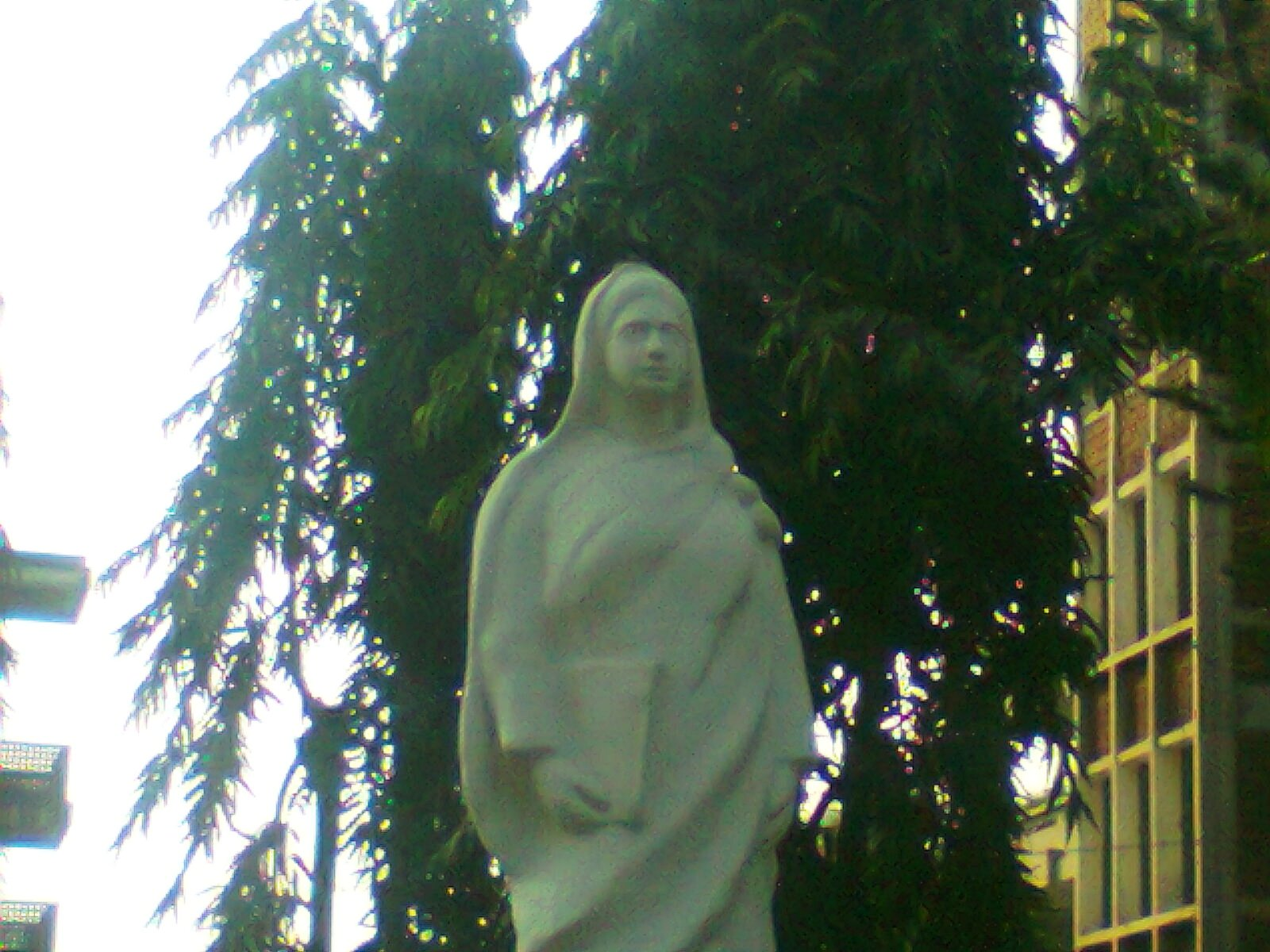
Statue of Rokeya on the premises of Rokeya Hall, University of Dhaka

Rokeya is considered the pioneer feminist of Bengal. Universities, public buildings and a National Award has been named after her in Bangladesh. She was an inspiration for many later generation female authors, including Sufia Kamal, Tahmima Anam, and others.

=== Eponyms ===
- Begum Rokeya Day, a commemoration of the birth and death anniversary of Rokeya, is observed annually on 9 December in Bangladesh.
- Begum Rokeya Padak, a Bangladeshi national honour conferred on individual women for their exceptional achievements.
- Begum Rokeya Memorial Center, an academic and cultural hub in Pairaband, Bangladesh.
- Begum Rokeya Avenue, a street in Dhaka.
- Begum Rokeya University, a public state university in Bangladesh.
- Rokeya Hall, the largest female residential hall of the University of Dhaka. Khulna University of Engineering and Technology, Bangladesh Agricultural University, and Rajshahi University also have a female residential hall named after Begum Rokeya.
- Sakhawat Memorial Govt. Girls' High School, Kolkata, West Bengal.
- Begum Rokeya Smriti Balika Vidalaya in Saltlake, West Bengal.
- Alokbortika (Bengali: আলোকবর্তিকা, lit. 'torch bearer') is a commemorative statue of Begum Rokeya, in Rangpur City, unveiled in 2020.
