= Sakhawat Memorial Govt. Girls' High School =

Location
- 17, Lord Sinha Road, Elgin; Kolkata, West Bengal, 700071; India
- 22.5447°N 88.3490°E

Information
- Established: 1911
- Campus type: Urban

Sakhawat Memorial Govt. Girls' High School is located on Lord Sinha Road in Kolkata, India.

It is a girls' school affiliated with the West Bengal Board of Secondary Education for the Madhyamik Pariksha (10th Board exams) and with the West Bengal Council of Higher Secondary Education for the Higher Secondary Examination. The school was established in 1911 by Begum Rokeya. As of January 2025, Papia Nag serves as the headmistress of the school.

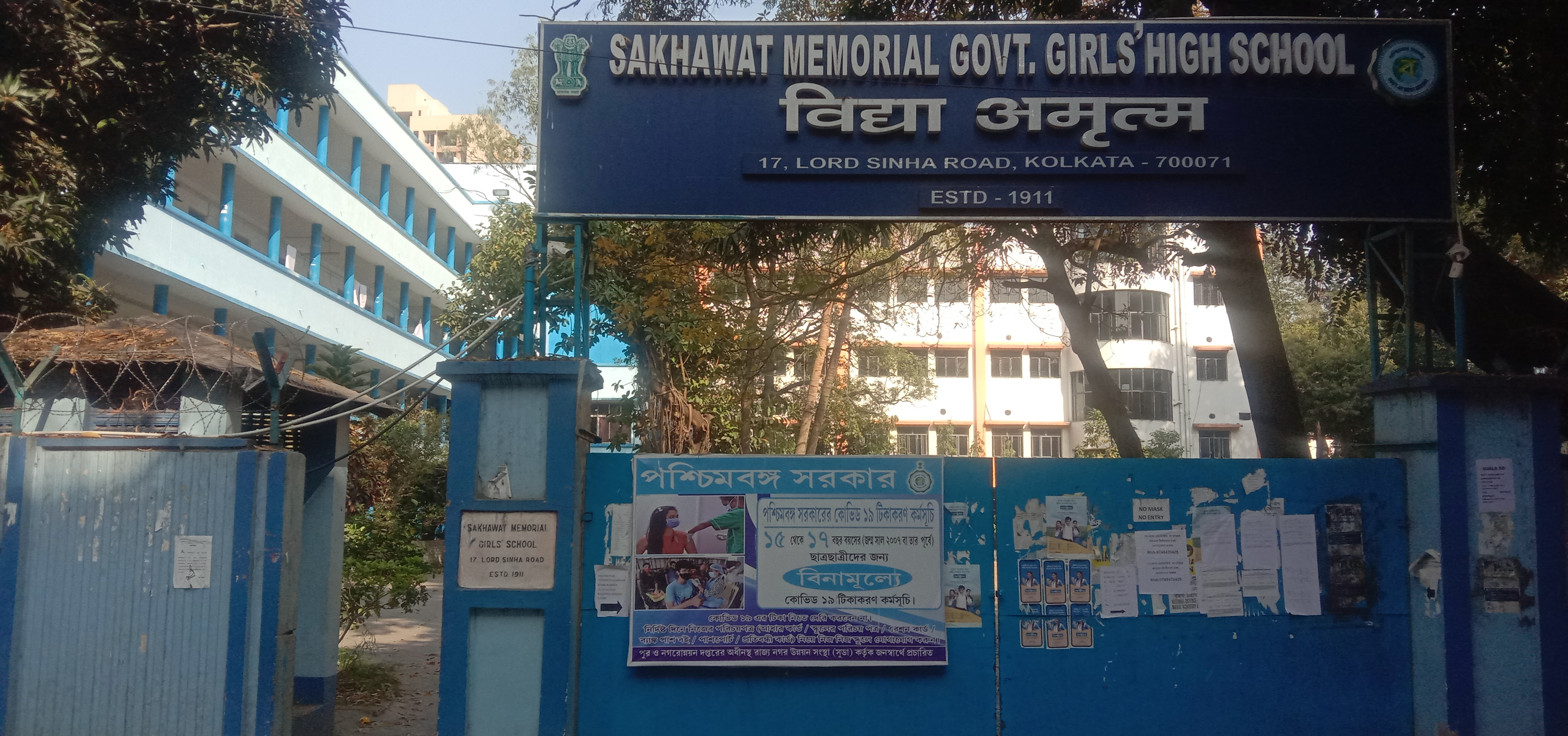
Sakhawat Memorial Govt. Girls' High School

== See also ==
- Education in India
- List of schools in India
- Education in West Bengal
