= Government Teachers' Training College, Dhaka =

- সরকারি টিচার্স ট্রেনিং কলেজ, ঢাকা
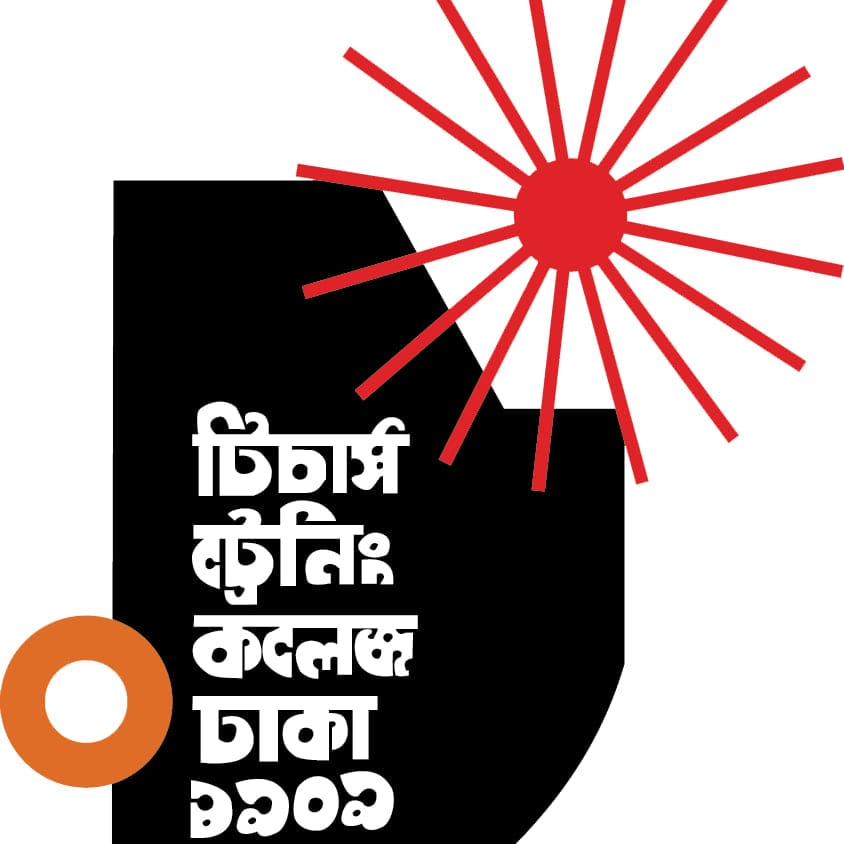
- Other names: TT College, Dhaka TTC, TTCD, DTTC, TTC Dhaka, TTC
- Type: Teachers' Training College, University College, Undergraduate College, Post-graduation College
- Established: January 6, 1909
- Affiliations: National University, Bangladesh
- Principal: Md. Golam Faruque
- Location: Dhanmondi, Mirpur Road, Dhaka-1205, Bangladesh; 23.7367°N 90.3828°E
- Mascot: Sun and Soul
- Website: ttc.dhaka.gov.bd

Government Teachers' Training College, Dhaka is a public college for training government teachers in Dhaka, Bangladesh.

It offers four-year (eight-semester) integrated Bachelor of Education, one-year professional Bachelor of Education (B.Ed) and Master of Education (M.Ed). Some teaching-learning related training programs by different projects are run in the college.

It is situated at the heart of the city in the New Market area.
