= New Dhaka =

New Dhaka নতুন ঢাকা
- Region
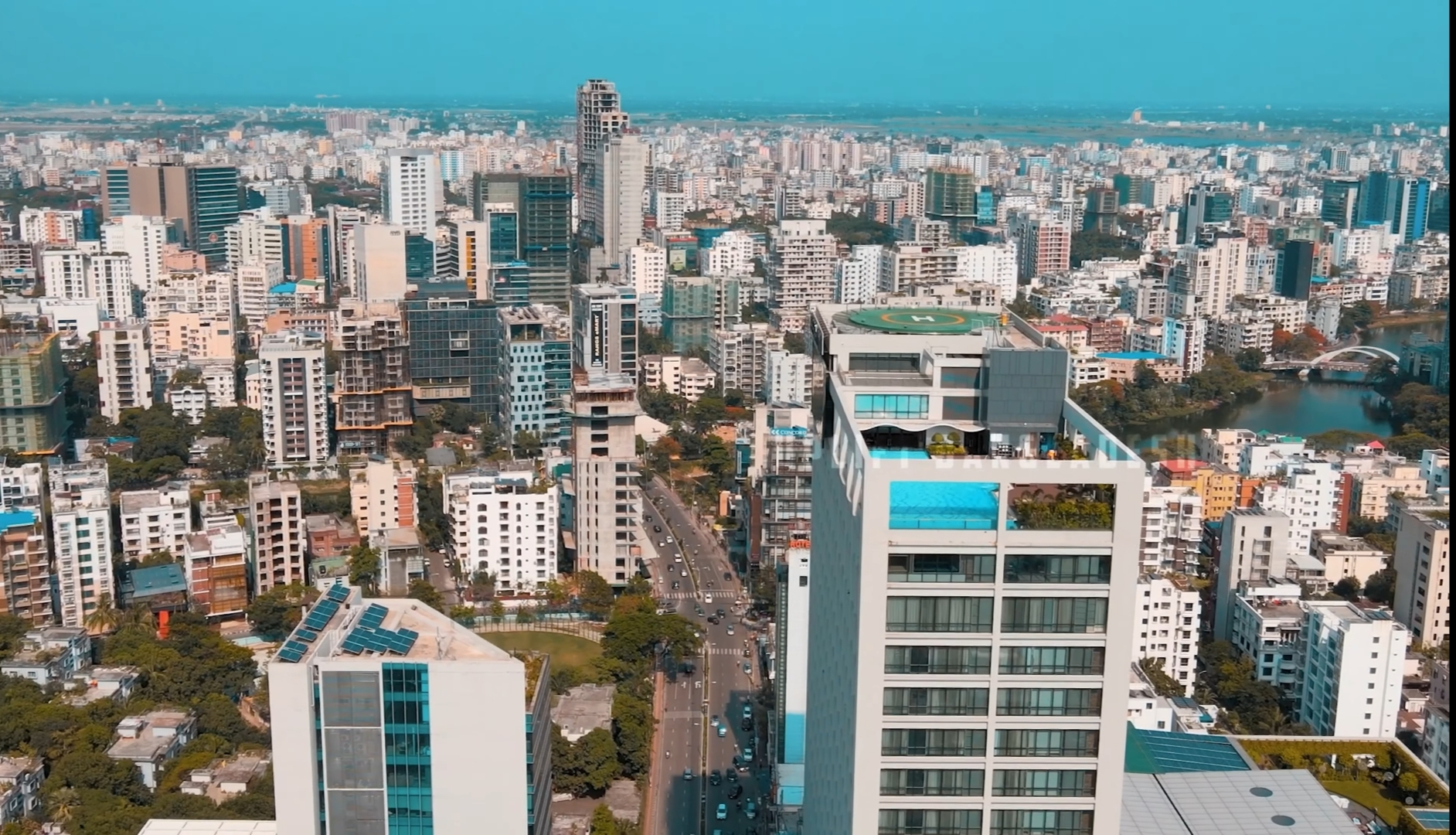
- Skyline of Gulshan - Banani
- Interactive map of New Dhaka
- Coordinates: 23.8161°N 90.4056°E
- Country: Bangladesh
- District: Dhaka District
- City Corporation: Dhaka North City Corporation; Dhaka South City Corporation

New Dhaka (Bengali: নতুন ঢাকা, romanized: Notun Dhaka or Bengali: নয়া ঢাকা, romanized: Noya Dhaka) is an unofficial term used to describe the area located north of Old Dhaka that has been incorporated in the city of Dhaka, the capital and largest city of Bangladesh over time. The term is ambiguous, as it may refer either to upscale and/or planned neighbourhoods with wider streets, modern buildings, and improved facilities, or to the city of Dhaka excluding the Old Dhaka region.

== History ==
After the independence of Bangladesh, Dhaka became the capital of the new country. As immigrants from the other regions of the country started to visit the city more, the city expanded from the south to the northern region of Tongi–Gazipur. The expended part became known as "New Dhaka", and Dhakaiyas, natives of the Old Dhaka, started to call the residents of the new city "New Dhakaiyas". In 2021, the fourth Hasina ministry expressed the desire to expand New Dhaka beyond Turag River towards west.

== Society ==
As of researcher M Mamun Hossain, most people of New Dhaka live under a Single-family detached home.

== Neighbourhoods ==
=== Aftab Nagar ===
Aftab Nagar (originally known as Jahurul Islam City) is a neighbourhood in Dhaka that is initiated by Eastern Housing Limited. Aftabnagar sits in the heart of Dhaka at Rampura. It is believed that the area still holds the lush green environment of Dhaka. In the seasons of Autumn, there are fields of Catkin flowers or 'Kaashbon'.

=== Bailey Road ===
Bailey Road is a well-known thoroughfare and an upscale area in Ramna, Dhaka, the capital city of Bangladesh. It is a classic road in Dhaka which runs through Shiddheswari, connecting Hare Road with Shantinagar junction. It is regarded as one of the busiest areas of the city, constructed during the colonial era, now serving both as a residential area for civil servants, high court judges as well as government offices and shopping malls and food courts. The Bailey Road is considered as two distinct roads, one after another, they are the new Bailey Road and the Bailey Road. The new Bailey Road is well recognised for its famous theatres, numerous boutiques, shops, schools, fast foods, restaurants and various hangout places. The old Bailey Road is reputable because of the officers club, Foreign Service academy and homes of ministers, officers and government officials.

=== Banani ===
Banani is an upscale residential and commercial neighbourhood and a thana of Dhaka. It hosts five-star hotels, upscale restaurants, luxury apartments, international schools, and the offices of many local and multinational companies. Banani is considered an important central business district, and its commercial landscape is among the most important in Dhaka, coming after the likes of the nearby financial district of Gulshan Avenue, Karwan Bazar, Tejgaon Industrial Area and downtown Motijheel CBD, the nation's largest and most important CBD.

==== Banani DOHS ====
Banani DOHS, also known as "Old DOHS", is a neighborhood of Dhaka, located in Banani. It was created under the Defense Officers Housing Scheme (DOHS) of the Government of Bangladesh.

=== Banasree ===
Banasree is a residential area of Dhaka in Bangladesh which has been developed by Eastern Housing Limited (EHL).

=== Baridhara ===
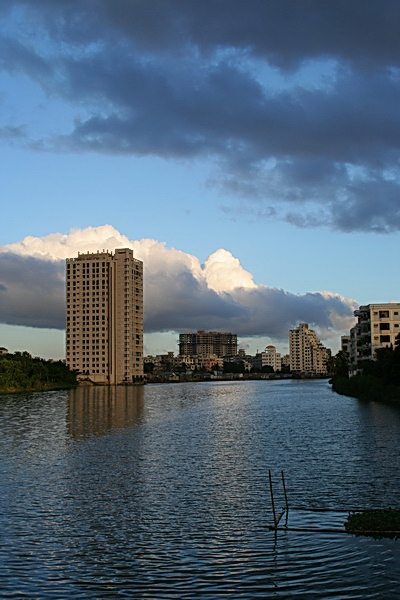
Lake on Baridhara

Baridhara (Bengali: বারিধারা) is an upscale residential area in Dhaka, Bangladesh. It is located on the east of and northeast of Gulshan across Gulshan-Baridhara Lake. It has special zones designated for diplomats, and many of the city's foreign embassies and high commissions are situated here. There are mainly three areas: a diplomatic zone in the southwest portion, a general residential area in the eastern portion, and an adjacent DOHS area in the northeast portion.

==== Baridhara DOHS ====
Baridhara DOHS is a neighborhood in Baridhara, Dhaka, Bangladesh.

=== Bashundhara ===
Bashundhara Residential Area, or simply Bashundhara, is an upscale residential and semi-business neighbourhood in Dhaka, Bangladesh. Described as a "city inside a city," the area is the largest private real estate project in Greater Dhaka. It is owned and operated by East West Property Development Pvt. Ltd., a subsidiary of Bashundhara Group.

=== Dhaka Cantonment area ===
Cantonment Thana (Bengali: ক্যান্টনমেন্ট) is a Thana of Dhaka district in Dhaka Division, Bangladesh. It includes the Army Headquarters, Naval Headquarters and the Air Force Headquarters. Cantonment Thana was formed in 1976.

=== Dhanmondi ===
Dhanmondi is an upscale residential and commercial neighbourhood and a thana (police jurisdiction) in Dhaka, Bangladesh, known for its central location, cultural vibrancy and being home to the country's founder, Sheikh Mujibur Rahman. Dhanmondi Thana falls within the administrative areas of both the Dhaka North and Dhaka South city corporations.

=== Green Model Town ===
Green Model Town is a private housing project straddling the boundary between Demra and Khilgaon Thanas of Dhaka District, Bangladesh. It is being developed by Amin Mohammad Lands Development Limited (AMLDL), a subsidiary of Amin Mohammad Group.

=== Gulshan ===
Gulshan is a thana situated in Dhaka, Bangladesh. It is an affluent residential and business neighbourhood and is now home to a number of the city's restaurants, five star hotels, shopping centers, schools, banks, offices and members' clubs; it also hosts the majority of embassies and high commissions in Bangladesh. Many Bangladeshi and international companies have their offices in Gulshan.

=== Jolshiri Abashon ===
Jolshiri Abashon is an under construction residential area developed by Jolshiri Abashon corporation, a sister corporation of the Army Officers Housing Scheme, in Rupganj Upazila, Narayanganj District. It is being built for Bangladesh Army officers with residential plot purchase available for cilvilians at sectors 1 and 2. It was referred to by the name Army Housing Scheme in the past. Spread over 2133.349 acres and 17 sectors, the area will have various facilities including educational institutes, hospitals, mosques, parks, lakes, lakeside walkway and cycle track, amusement park, stadium, golf course, bus stand, taxi stand, filling stations, fire service, bridges, apartments, and commercial spaces. There will be provision for underground utility facilities. 48% of total area will be open space and 28.73% will be roads. Estimated project cost is $2 billion.

=== Kakrail ===
Kakrail (Bengali: কাকরাইল) is a neighbourhood in Dhaka. It is under Ramna Thana and falls under the jurisdiction of Dhaka South City Corporation. Over time, Kakrail has grown into a mostly residential area, with apartment plots and schools, but subsequently, several NGOs and government offices have been set up there.

=== Khilgaon ===
Khilgaon (Bengali: খিলগাঁও) is a thana (police jurisdiction) and neighbourhood in the city of Dhaka, Bangladesh. The thana encompasses Dhaka South City Corporation wards 24, 25, and 26.

=== Lalmatia ===
Lalmatia is a small residential area located in Dhaka, Bangladesh. It is a part of Mohammadpur Thana and is located at the south side of Mohammadpur, bordering with Dhanmondi and Sher-e-Bangla Nagar. Known for its narrow streets and red-bricked houses, the area has undergone a modernisation process with bungalows being replaced by high-rise buildings having flats as well as some commercial spaces. Four busy roads namely the Satmasjid Road, Road No. 27 of Dhanmondi (renamed to Road No. 16), Mirpur Road, and the Asad Avenue surrounds the mahallah from all four sides. The neighbourhood is undergoing huge development works.

=== Mirpur ===
Mirpur is a thana of Dhaka city, Bangladesh. It is bounded by Pallabi Thana to the north, Mohammadpur Thana to the south, Kafrul to the east, and Savar Upazila to the west. For administrative convenience three new thanas, namely Shah Ali, Pallabi Thana and Kafrul Thana have been carved out of old Mirpur Thana.

==== Mirpur DOHS ====
Mirpur DOHS is a neighbourhood of Dhaka North, situated in Dhaka City.

=== Mohakhali ===
Mohakhali (Bengali: মহাখালী) is a neighborhood of Dhaka city, the capital of Bangladesh. Mohakhali is one of the busiest places in Dhaka city. Mohakhali is bounded by Banani in the north and Tejgoan area in the south while Gulshan and Niketan is in the east and Mohakhali DOHS to the west.

==== Mohakhali DOHS ====
Mohakhali DOHS is a neighborhood of Dhaka for Armed Forces Officers. The neighborhoods belong in the Dhaka North City Corporation.

=== Niketan ===
Niketan also known as Niketan Residential Area, Gulshan or Niketan Housing Society is an upscale residential neighbourhood in Dhaka, Bangladesh. Niketan is also a part of Gulshan Thana and Ward No. 20 of Dhaka North City Corporation.

=== Pallabi ===
Pallabi (Bengali: পল্লবী) is a thana of Dhaka District in the Division of Dhaka, Bangladesh.

=== Purbachal ===
Purbachal New Town Project or formerly Purbachal Residential Model Town is the biggest planned township in Bangladesh. The project area consists of about 6,213 acres (25.14 km^{2}) land located in between the Shitalakshya and the Balu rivers at Rupganj thana of Narayanganj district and at Kaliganj thana of Gazipur district, in the northeastern side of Dhaka. The township is linked with a fourteen-lane expressway from the Airport Road-Progati Sarani intersection in Dhaka. The plan includes the provision of approximately 26,000 residential plots of various sizes and 62,000 apartments, complete with essential infrastructure and urban amenities.

=== Segunbagicha ===
Segunbagicha (Bengali: সেগুনবাগিচা, romanised: Shegunbagicha) is an upscale residential, administrative, commercial, and institutional neighbourhood in south-central Dhaka. The neighbourhood is one of the important areas of Dhaka featuring a large number of government and residential complexes. It acts as a bridge between the major thanas of Ramna, Shahbagh, Dhanmondi, Paltan and Motijheel, and is located at the crossroads of Ramna, Shahbag and Paltan thanas.

Segunbagicha is a centre of government office building and institutions including the headquarters of The Directorate General of National Security Intelligence, Anti-Corruption Commission (commonly known as duduk; দুদক), Motsho Bhobon (building of Department of Fisheries), Bangladesh Secretariat, the International Mother Language Institute, Bangladesh Shilpakala Academy, the Public Works Department, the Bangladesh Department of Architecture, the Ministry of Foreign Affairs as well as several tax zones.

=== Sher-e-Bangla Nagar ===
Sher-e-Bangla Nagar (Bengali: শেরেবাংলা নগর; lit. City of the Lion of Bengal) is a neighborhood and a thana of Dhaka, the capital of Bangladesh. It is also known as the 'capitol within the capital' due to it being the home to the National Parliament and Ganabhaban. The area was named after A. K. Fazlul Huq, a Bangladeshi statesman and political figure who was known as "Sher-e-Bangla" (Tiger of Bengal). The thana was formed in 2009 from parts of Tejgaon, Kafrul and Mohammadpur thanas. Sher-e-Bangla Nagar is a commercial and central neighborhood in the city, home to offices of government and public institutions, educational institutions, banks and financial institutions and shops.

==== Agargaon ====
Agargaon is an administrative neighbourhood in the Bangladeshi city of Dhaka.

=== Tejgaon ===
Tejgaon (Bengali: তেজগাঁও) is a thana of Dhaka District in the Division of Dhaka, Bangladesh. It is in the centre of Dhaka, the capital. In 2006, the boundaries of the thana were redrawn when Tejgaon Industrial Area Thana was created out of the former larger area and again in 2009 when Sher-e-Bangla Nagar Thana was created.

=== Tejgaon Industrial Area ===
Tejgaon Industrial Area Thana is a Thana of Dhaka District in the Division of Dhaka, Bangladesh that was formed in 2006.

=== Uttara ===
Uttara Model Town or simply Uttara is a neighbourhood of Dhaka, the capital of Bangladesh. The name derives from the Bengali word uttor meaning "north". It lies on the road to Gazipur, and adjoins Hazrat Shahjalal International Airport. In 1966, Dhaka Improvement Trust planned to build a satellite town under North Satellite Town project in Dhaka District. In 1980, DIT changed the project name into Uttara Residential Model Town Project.
