= Syed Jamil Ahmed =

Bangladeshi scholar and theatre designer

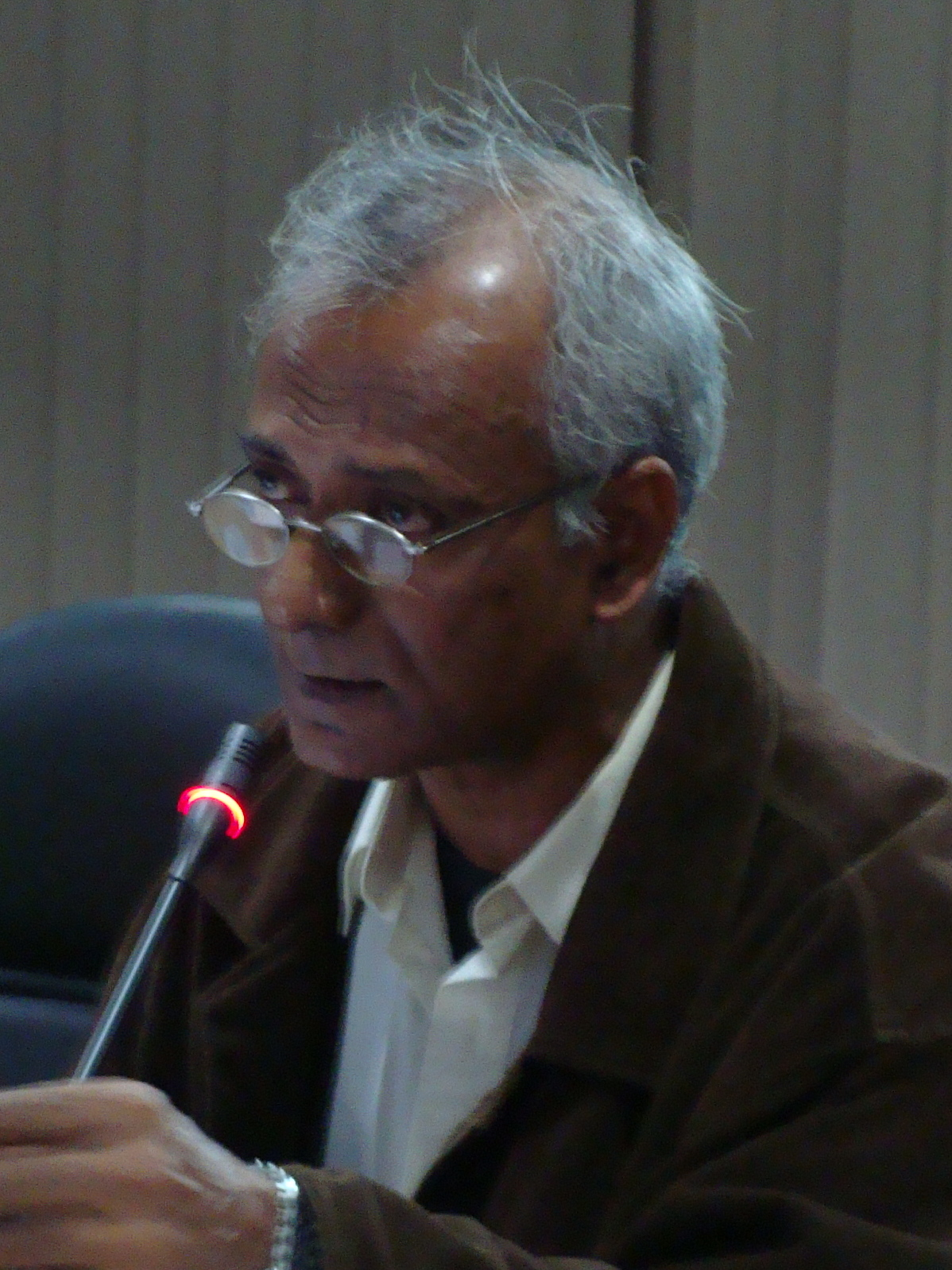
- Ahmed in 2009

Director General of Shilpakala Academy
- In office 9 September 2024 – 28 February 2025
- Preceded by: Liaquat Ali Lucky
- Succeeded by: Rezauddin Stalin

Personal details
- Born: 7 April 1955 (age 71)
- Education: National School of Drama; University of Warwick

Syed Jamil Ahmed (born 7 April 1955) is a Bangladeshi scholar, theatre director, and founding chair of the Department of Theatre and Music at the University of Dhaka. He served as the Director General of Shilpakala Academy during 2024–2025. His most notable theatre productions include Kamala Ranir Sagar Dighi (1997), Ek Hazar Aur Ek Thi Rate (1998), Behular Bhasan (2004), Pahiye (2006) and Shong Bhong Chong (2009). He won Nandikar National Theatre Award of Calcutta and the B.V. Karanth Award of India's National School of Drama (NSD).

Ahmed announced his resignation from Shilpakala Academy on 28 February 2025 citing bureaucratic challenges and restrictions on artistic expression.

== Early life and education ==
Ahmed was born in Dhaka on 7 April 1955. He joined the Liberation War in 1971 as a freedom fighter. The violence of the war impacted him, "having seen dead bodies rotting with gaping holes and the charred remains of abandoned homes, [for] having walked the streets of Dhaka city, clasping the clip of an unpinned grenade in [his] trousers pocket." Ahmed came in touch with an amateur theatre group named Dhaka Theatre in 1974 and began to consider theatre as a career. In 1975, Ahmed received a scholarship from the Indian Council for Cultural Relations (ICCR), and dropped out of English Literature BA (Hons) programme at the University of Dhaka to join the National School of Drama in New Delhi. Here, from 1975 to 1978, he studied for three years and worked as an apprentice fellow for another year, under Ebrahim Alkazi and B. V. Karanth. Alkazi guided him through 'Western' theatre, and Karanth through traditional theatre of South Asia. He received his Diploma in Dramatic Arts with distinction from the National School of Drama in 1978. In 1989, he received his Master of Arts degree in theatre from University of Warwick. "Indigenous theatrical forms" was the subject of his thesis, which earned him a PhD degree from the University of Dhaka.

== Stage design and applied theatre ==
After his return from the National School of Drama to Bangladesh in 1979, Ahmed began working as a stage and light designer, achieving critical acclaim for plays such as Achalayantan (the Immovable), Raktakarabi (Red Oleanders) and Chitrangada by Rabindranath Tagore in Calcutta, India. He was part of the shift from the painted scene design of the 1970s to the realist, symbolic and surrealist design in the 1980s. He was awarded the Munir Chowdhury Samman in 1993 for his influence in the realist design. After eight years of free-lance theatre practice, Ahmed studied under Clive Barker at the University of Warwick in England, in 1987–88. Barker introduced him to Theatre-for-Development (Applied Theatre today) and in Latin America and Africa. Upon his return home, he engaged with a left-leaning landless farmers' political party, and then with international and national Non-Governmental Organizations working in Bangladesh. In 1992, he was elected to the Ashoka Fellowship by the Ashoka Foundation (USA). By 1995, he was disillusioned on all applied theatre fronts.

== Teaching, directing, and writing ==
Ahmed joined the University of Dhaka in 1989 and later founded the Department of Theatre and Music in 1994. He built a performance-oriented pedagogy, which led to its recognition as a major centre of experimental and innovative productions. His major contribution to the pedagogy of the department, now grown into the Department of Theatre and Performance Studies, has been the introduction of theatre-for-development, theatre-in-education, performance studies, sociology of theatre, and psychoanalysis in theatre. His academic work led him to be awarded two Fulbright Fellowships The first time, in 1990, his award took him to Antioch College as a scholar-in-residence, where he taught and directed (with Denny Patridge), The Wheel, an English translation of Salim Al Deen's Chaka. The second award took him to City College of San Francisco in 2005, as a visiting specialist under the programme "Direct Access to the Muslim World". Ahmed wrote a six-hour epic tragedy based on the Karbala legend and Mir Mosharraf Hossian's novelization of the legend.

From 1993 to 1997, he embarked on "voyages" to distant rural pockets of Bangladesh and attended numerous performances of the indigenous theatre in situ. He was awarded PhD by the University of Dhaka in 1997 for his thesis on "Indigenous Theatrical Performance in Bangladesh: Its History and Practice". Part of his PhD research was published as Achinpākhi Infinity: Indigenous Theatre of Bangladesh. Kamala Ranir Sagar Dighi (based on the indigenous form of narrative performance Pala Gan) in 1997 in Dhaka, Ek Hazar Aur Ek Thi Rate (based on The Thousand and One Nights) in 1998 in Karachi, Behular Bhasan (an adaptation of the Padma Puran) 2004 in Dhaka, Pahiye (Hindi translation of Chaka) at the National School of Drama in New Delhi in 2006, and Shong Bhong Chong (based on the indigenous theatre form of Shong Jatra), in Dhaka in 2009 all were influenced by his time in rural Bangladesh. They contributed to him winning the Nandikar National Theatre Award, in Calcutta, in 1999. Behular Bhasan participated in Bharat Rang Mahotav, New Delhi, 2006, and Leela: South Asian Women's Theatre Festival, Kolkata and New Delhi, 2010.

== Awards ==
- Bangla Academy Literary Award (2024)

== Books ==
- Hajar Bachhar: Bangladesher Natak O Natyakala, Bangladesh Shilpakala Academy, Dhaka, 1995.
- Acinpakhi Infinity: Indigenous Theatre of Bangladesh, University Press Limited, Dhaka, 2000.
- Trtiya Bishwer Bikalpa Natyadhara: Unnayan Natya: Tattwa O Prayog, Shamabesh, Dhaka, 2001.
- In Praise of Niranjan: Islam, Theatre and Bangladesh, Pathak Samabesh, Dhaka, 2001.
- Reading Against the Orientalist Grain, Anderson Printing House, Kolkata, 2008.
- Applied Theatricks: Essays in Refusal, Anderson Printing House, Kolkata, 2013.
