= Mohammed Nurul Absar =

- Born: Moheshkhali, East Pakistan, Pakistan
- Education: Royal Naval Engineering College; National University, Bangladesh; Trinity University; University of Dhaka
- Military career
- Allegiance: Bangladesh
- Branch: Bangladesh Navy
- Service years: 1980 - 2017
- Rank: Commodore
- Commands: BNS Titumir; BNS Shaheed Moazzem
- Conflicts: UNAMIR; UNMIL

Mohammed Nurul Absar is a retired commodore of the Bangladesh Navy and former chairman of the Cox's Bazar Development Authority. From 2009 to 2013, Absar served as the naval secretary of Bangladesh. He founded the think tank Central Foundation for International and Strategic Studies.

== Early life and education ==
Absar was born in Moheshkhali Upazila, Cox's Bazar District. He studied electronics engineering at the Marshal Tito Yugoslav Center for Higher Naval Studies. In 1988, he completed postgraduate studies in electronics and weapon application at the Royal Naval Engineering College in the United Kingdom.

Absar later earned a Master's in Defence Studies from National University, Bangladesh in 1997. He completed an MBA from Trinity University in 2000. He completed a postgraduate degree in disaster management from the University of Dhaka in 2014. He is currently a PhD Fellow at the Bangladesh University of Professionals.

== Military career ==
Absar served in the Bangladesh Navy for 38 years in various command and staff roles. From 1999 to 2005, he served as a faculty member of the Defence Services Command and Staff College. Absar has served in UN peacekeeping operations in Liberia and Rwanda, holding positions such as deputy chief operation officer. Absar led the Bangladesh delegation to the United Nations Permanent Forum on Indigenous Issues in 2015. From 2009 to 2013, he was the naval secretary, contributing to policy formulation and the Navy's organisational development. He was then appointed to the National Security of Intelligence.

He retired from naval service on December 29, 2017, but continued his involvement in national service through a contract appointment at the Prime Minister's Office under Prime Minister Sheikh Hasina. From 2016 onward, he was associated with the National Defence College (NDC), where he served as a faculty member overseeing MPhil thesis projects for senior military and civil officials.

Absar was a senior research fellow at the Bangladesh Institute of International and Strategic Studies. He is also recognized as an expert in cyber and nuclear security and served on the National Committee on Cyber Security and Physical Security for the Rooppur Nuclear Power Plant. He was a director of National Security Intelligence. In 2020, he established the Central Foundation for International and Strategic Studies.

In 2022, Absar was appointed chairman of the Cox's Bazar Development Authority, which operates under the Ministry of Housing and Public Works. He replaced Lieutenant Colonel Forkan Ahmad, the first chairman of the Cox's Bazar Development Authority. He worked on creating a 20 year master plan for Cox's Bazar. The government had allocated Bangladeshi Taka 20 billion for the city's development. He said plans were made for cable cars and seaplanes were being considered for tourists.
