= Department of Architecture =

Department of Architecture may refer to:

- Department of Architecture, University of Cambridge
- Department of Architecture (Bangladesh)
- Department of Architecture, Universiti Teknologi Malaysia

== See also ==
- School of Architecture, Oxford Brookes University
- MIT School of Architecture and Planning
