= Kamal Lohani =

Bangladeshi journalist (1934–2020)

- কামাল লোহানী
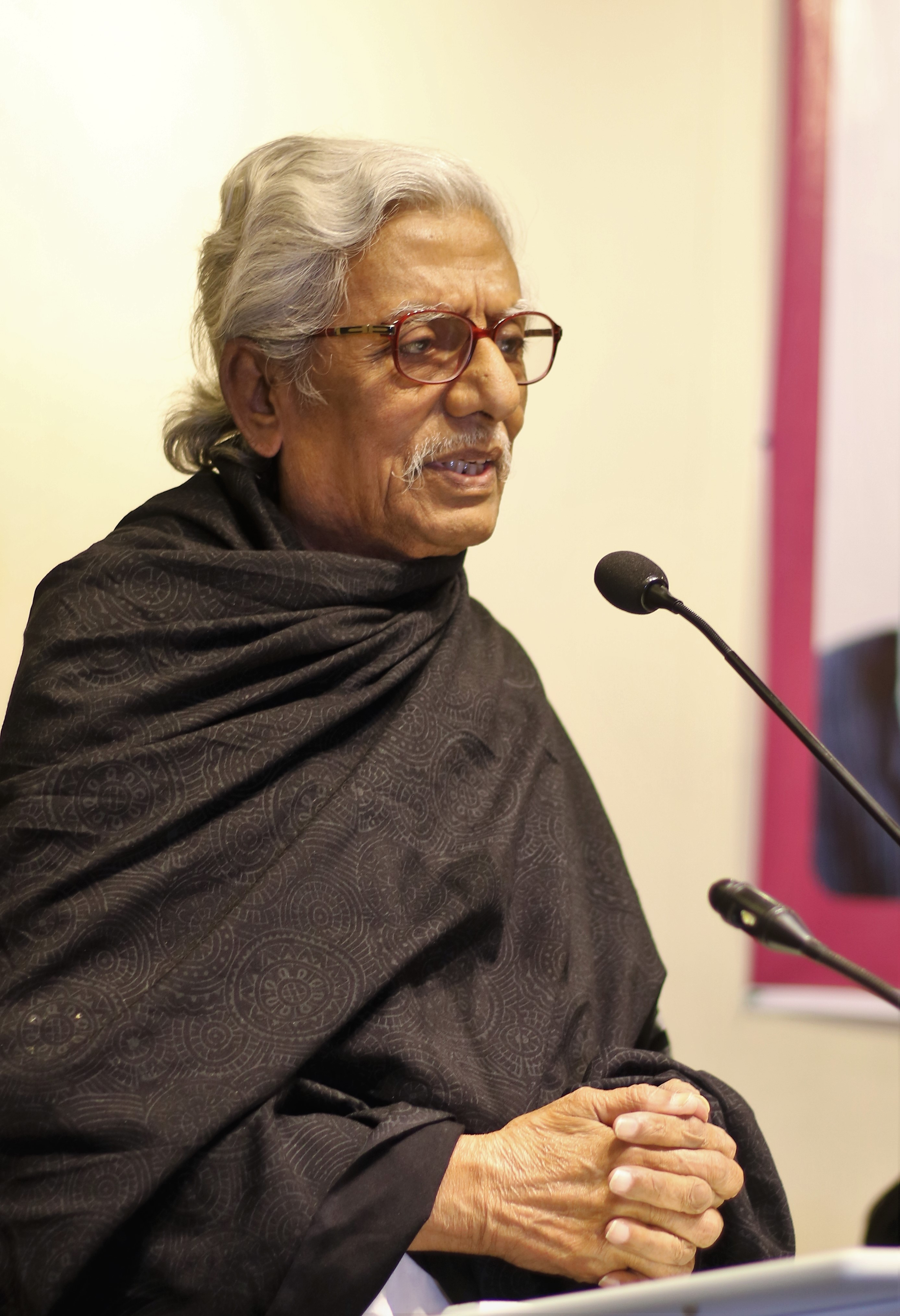
- Lohani in 2018

Director General of Shilpakala Academy
- In office 20 April 2009 – 10 April 2011
- Preceded by: Bhuiyan Shafiqul Islam
- Succeeded by: Liaquat Ali Lucky

Personal details
- Born: Abu Naeem Mohammad Mostafa Kamal Khan Lohani; 26 June 1934 British Raj
- Died: 20 June 2020 (aged 85) Dhaka, Bangladesh
- Cause of death: COVID-19
- Resting place: Sontala Central Graveyard, Sirajganj
- Party: Communist Party of Bangladesh
- Spouse: Syeda Dipti Rani (m. 1960; died 2007)
- Children: 3
- Occupation: Journalist, administrator

Kamal Lohani (26 June 1934 – 20 June 2020) was a Bangladeshi journalist. He was awarded Ekushey Padak in 2015 by the Government of Bangladesh. He served as the director general of Shilpakala Academy from April 2009 until April 2011.

== Career ==
Lohani got his first job as a journalist in the Daily Millat in 1955. He joined as a secretary at Chhayanaut, a cultural organization, in 1962. He formed a left cultural organization – Kranti in 1967.

== Early life ==
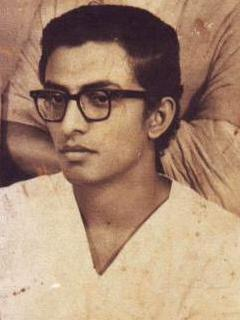
Lohani in 1960

Abu Naeem Mohammad Mostafa Kamal Khan Lohani was born on 26 June 1934, in the village of Khan Santala into a Bengali Muslim Khan Pathan family descended from the Lohani Pashtun tribe in the then Pabna District (now Ullahpara Upazila of Sirajganj District). His father's name was Abu Yusuf Mohammad Musa Khan Lohani and his mother's name was Rokeya Khanam Lohani. In 1952, he passed the secondary examination from Pabna Zilla School. He completed his higher education from Govt. Edward College, Pabna.

== Personal life ==
In 1960, Lohani married his cousin Syeda Dipti Rani. She was his fellow political party member. Together they had two daughters and a son.

== Death ==
Lohani died from COVID-19-related complications on 20 June 2020, amid the COVID-19 pandemic in Bangladesh.
