= Liaquat Ali Lucky =

Bangladeshi artist

- লিয়াকত আলী লাকী

Director General of Shilpakala Academy
- In office 10 April 2011 – 12 August 2024
- Preceded by: Kamal Lohani
- Succeeded by: Syed Jamil Ahmed

Personal details
- Born: 13 January 1957 (age 69) Nawabganj Upazila, Dhaka, East Pakistan, Pakistan
- Education: University of Dhaka

Liaquat Ali Lucky (born 13 January 1957) is a Bangladeshi actor, director, singer, composer and cultural organiser. He served as director general of Shilpakala Academy from April 2011 to August 2024. He was awarded Ekushey Padak by the Government of Bangladesh in 2019. As of 2018, he has acted in 58 theatre plays and directed 82 plays.

== Early life and career ==
Lucky was born to Sheikh Sadek Ali and Majeda Begum on 13 January 1957 in Nawabganj Upazila, Dhaka. He completed his bachelor's and master's in English literature from the University of Dhaka.

== Criticism ==
Liaquat Ali Lucky took a stand for the government during the repression of the dictatorship Awami League government on the students in the quota reform movement that took place in 2024. During the movement, a group of pro-autocracy Awami artists, including Liaquat Ali Lucky, were active against the movement in a WhatsApp group called 'Alo Ashbei' led by actor Ferdous. After the non-cooperation movement, on September 3, 2024, some screenshots related to that WhatsApp group were spread on social media.

== Awards ==
- Dhaka University Gold Medal (1984)
- The Unique Group Gold Medal (2000)
- The Face of Bengal Award (2004)
- Honorary Cultural Envoy of Japan Award (2004)
- Munier Chowdhury Medal (2013)
- Poet Mahbub ul Alam Chowdhury Award (2015)
- Journalist Bojlur Rahman Memorial Medal (2015)
- Dr Bhupen Hazarika Byatikrom International Award (2018)
