= Urban Development Directorate =

Urban Development Directorate may refer to:

- Urban Development Directorate (Bangladesh)
- Urban Development Directorate (Uttarakhand)
