= Madaripur Shilpakala Academy =

Madaripur Shilpakala Academy Zilla Shilpakala Academy
- Motto: Performing Arts
- Established: February 19, 1974
- Chair: Deputy Commissioner Madaripur
- Vice Chairman: Basher Mahmud
- Owner: Ministry of Cultural Affairs
- Address: Main Road, New Town, Madaripur 7900.
- Location: Madaripur, Madaripur, Bangladesh
- Website: shilpakala.madaripur.gov.bd

Madaripur Shilpakala Academy or Zilla Shilpakala Academy, Madaripur (Bengali: জেলা শিল্পকলা একাডেমি, মদারীপুর), is the principal state-sponsored district cultural center located at Main Road, Madaripur, Bangladesh. It is the district academy of fine and performing arts. The academy is headed by a Director General.

The academy arranged various programs such as dance, drama festival, music and art, etc. The academy is well known mostly for its various programs staged on national events. It celebrates almost all functions of Bengali culture.

== See also ==
- Shilpakala Academy
- National Art Gallery (Bangladesh)
