= Architech =

Architectural Association of Universiti Teknologi Malaysia
- Formation: January 1, 1984; 42 years ago
- Type: Student Association
- Legal status: Association
- Purpose: Educational
- Headquarters: Faculty of Built Environment, Universiti Teknologi Malaysia
- Location: Skudai, Johor, Malaysia
- Region served: South-East ASia
- Members: Students of Architecture in Universiti Teknologi Malaysia
- President: Amirul Bin Abd Hamid
- Parent organization: Department of Architecture, Universiti Teknologi Malaysia
- Website: https://www.instagram.com/architech.utm/

The Architectural Association of Universiti Teknologi Malaysia (Malay: Persatuan Senibina Universiti Teknologi Malaysia or PSUTM), more commonly known as Architech, is the official association for students of architecture in UTM. It was formed in the 70s during the Kuala Lumpur days, and one of the earliest students association to be registered under Office of Students' Affair (HEMA, previously HEP), and is acknowledged as one of the most active students association in UTM. It resides within the Department of Architecture, Universiti Teknologi Malaysia, under the Faculty of Built Environment.

== Role ==
The main role of Architech is to manage the welfare of the UTM architecture students, organize events of various forms for the benefits of its members, to become the voice of the students in the school, and ultimately to ensure the advancement of non-academic qualities amongst its members.

== Logo ==
The Architech logo was a result of a design competition held by the association in 1992, initiated by the president at the time, Zulhisham and Che Wan Ahmad Faizal. At the time, the name Architech have not come into being, and the logo competition was actually for PSUTM. The prize advertised was RM200, however the participations were poor and uninspiring (less than 20 entries), hence no winner was picked. Instead, Che Wan Ahmad Faizal then approached Fauzee Nasir to design a logo worthy for the association.

Using Aldus Freehand 2.0. on a classic Mac, Fauzee designed the logo, incorporating the name Architech for the first time. This was the first instance of the name in use. The logo and the name Architech was accepted by the general population, and remains in use until now.

=== Description ===
The logo utilizes simple and straightforward typography, using Times New Roman, beginning with a capital A and with italic type applied to the last four letters. The letters "Archi" will normally be black on white/light background, or white on black/dark background. The letters "tech" will normally be red, or gray in monochrome print.

=== Rights and Ownership ===
The Architech logo was designed and still owned by Fauzee Nasir until today. In a deal struck with the association, the association agreed not to pay the RM200 prize money to Fauzee Nasir as the design was not part of the competition. Hence, the designer retains ownership and rights to the logo. However, in a mutual agreement the designer gave right to use and reproduce the logo as long as it is not for commercial use. Any commercial use must have written permission from the designer.

== Student Composition ==
Architech members consist of the entire population of architecture students in UTM, as students enrolled in the programme are automatically registered under it unless otherwise requested. Previously it also included students of landscape architecture until they formed their own students society in the late 1990s. When the diploma programme was shifted to UTM KL campus under the Razak School, the diploma students formed their own society called ARCO, which was intended as a sister society to Architech. However, due to logistics problem, especially since both are now under two different schools, ARCO became an independent body, but maintained close relations with Architech.

== Structure ==
=== Top Committee ===
Architech is led by its president, democratically elected amongst its members for a term of one year. The president is assisted by the vice president, secretary and treasurer, all of which are democratically elected as well. Together, they will form their government, electing individuals of various skills into official positions where their skills could be harnessed for the benefit of the society. These positions evolve and vary throughout the years to meet any needs.

Some example of the positions over the years are:

- Technical - in charge of management of technical aspects, such as asset, equipment and facilities management.
- Graphics - in charge of spearheading the graphical movement and activities.
- Sports - in charge of sporting events, be it competitive or recreational.
- Insaniah - in charge of spiritual development amongst its members, normally for the Muslim community.
- Website - in charge of development and maintenance of Architech's online presence (Blog, Forum, Facebook etc.)

== Publications ==
=== Architext ===
Architext was initiated as a periodical newsletter for Architech. It started around 1997, led by Roshida Majid and advised by Dr. Mohd Tajuddin Mohd Rasdi. Copies of the first two issues were lost; #3 was the earliest remaining copy today. It was distributed free bilingually in Bahasa Malaysia and English, featured several articles relating to architectural studies, listed events and activities, as well as a cartoon sketch.

Architext was never resumed and was presumably forgotten, until recently some of its original members began discussing of bringing it back.

=== Design Folio ===
The Design Folio is a publication collecting selected students' thesis works from a particular year. It is published with the notion of showcasing works based on specific theme for each publication. Students works are then selected based on the theme, ideally spanning between three and five years of thesis works. However, in its two innumeration, the selection is limited within a group of students in a particular year.

The publication is intended for commercial publications. The editorial consists of entirely students from the thesis group, advised and consulted by the Thesis Coordinators. To date, there have been two successful publications: the first in 2005 and the second in 2007. There was another manuscript managed to be completed in 2008, however due to funding limitations, it did not get published.

=== Design Thesis Synopsis ===
1997 Architectural Design Thesis.

== Anthem ==
The association have adopted a song written by one of the students in the late 80s, Zuhairi Harun. The song was titled 'Warisan', touching on the struggle of heritage and identity of architecture in Malaysia. The song have gone through a number of renditions, including quickening of tempo and change of melody, however the spirit of the song remains.

== Activities ==
=== Architectural Workshop ===
The architectural workshop is an annual national gatherings of architectural students in Malaysia. It began in 1987 in UTM, using the format of a jamboree, organised by Persatuan Arkitek (Architech) in Kuala Lumpur. Concurrently during the workshop, the PAM-Education Liaison Meeting would also take place to take advantage of the gatherings of students from various schools in one location.

Architech was the pioneer of the architectural workshop, which exists until today. The last architectural workshop hosted by Architech was in June 2011 using the theme "Terang". It was the biggest architectural workshop ever hosted by Architech, involving over 24 schools of architecture from all over Malaysia. It was officiated by PAM Vice President Ar. Saifuddin Ahmad. One of the outcome of the module was street furnitures, which became a feature in Jalan Wong Ah Fook, Johor Bahru. Over 20 sculptures were displayed and used by the public for a period of several days.

At the moment, it is undecided on when the next hosting by Architech will be, but it is estimated around 2016.
