= Narayanganj Development Authority =

Planning Agency Of Narayanganj

- নারায়ণগঞ্জ উন্নয়ন কর্তৃপক্ষ

Agency overview
- Formed: 2026; 0 years ago
- Superseding agency: RAJUK
- Jurisdiction: Narayanganj District
- Headquarters: Narayanganj, Bangladesh
- Agency executive: Chairman
- Parent department: Ministry of Housing and Public Works
- Parent agency: Government of Bangladesh

The Narayanganj Development Authority (Bengali: নারায়ণগঞ্জ উন্নয়ন কর্তৃপক্ষ, romanized: Nārāẏaṇagañja Unnôẏôn Kôrtipôkkhô; abbreviated as NDA) is a self-governing urban development authority in Narayanganj, Bangladesh, responsible for planning, regulating, and implementing the city’s master plan. Established in 2026 by the Government of Bangladesh, the authority oversees urban growth and prepares comprehensive master plans that are periodically reviewed to guide long-term urban development. The NDA operates under the Ministry of Housing and Public Works.
