= Rajshahi Development Authority =

Planning Agency Of Rajshahi

- রাজশাহী উন্নয়ন কর্তৃপক্ষ

Agency overview
- Formed: 1976; 50 years ago
- Superseding agency: Development of Rajshahi
- Jurisdiction: Rajshahi
- Headquarters: RDA Bhaban, Rajshahi, Bangladesh
- Agency executive: Md. Abul Kalam Azad, Chairman
- Parent agency: Ministry of Housing and Public Works
- Website: rdarajshahi.gov.bd

Rajshahi Development Authority (Bengali: রাজশাহী উন্নয়ন কর্তৃপক্ষ, romanized: Rājshāhī Unnôẏôn Kôrtipôkkhô; abbreviated as RDA) is a Bangladesh government urban planning authority responsible for the planned development, regulation, and management of Rajshahi, Bangladesh. Established in 1992 by the Government of Bangladesh, the authority is responsible for preparing and implementing the city's master plans, regulating urban development activities, and guiding the expansion of the Rajshahi metropolitan area. It operates under the Ministry of Housing and Public Works.

== History ==
Established in 1825, Rajshahi became a town in 1876. In 1876 Rajshahi Pourashava was established and it was upgraded as Rajshahi City Corporation in 1987. With the demand of time, a medical college, engineering and other universities, Radio Centre, airport and many other important establishment were founded in the city. As a result, in many ways importance of the city increased and the city grew in an unplanned way. Therefore, to ensure the city growth and development in a planned and sustainable way, Rajshahi Town Development Authority was established in October 1976 by Ordinance no. 78. The authority announced a Master Plan in 2015 for Rajshahi City covering the next 20 years. In 2019, Rajshahi Development Authority announced 11 development projects with a combined budget of 107 billion taka.
