= Mymensingh Development Authority =

Planning Agency Of Mymensigh

- ময়মনসিংহ উন্নয়ন কর্তৃপক্ষ

Agency overview
- Formed: 2026; 0 years ago
- Superseding agency: Development of Mymensingh
- Jurisdiction: Mymensingh
- Headquarters: Mymensingh, Bangladesh
- Agency executive: Chairman
- Parent department: Ministry of Housing and Public Works
- Parent agency: Government of Bangladesh

The Mymensingh Development Authority (Bengali: ময়মনসিংহ উন্নয়ন কর্তৃপক্ষ, romanized: Maẏamanasinha Unnôẏôn Kôrtipôkkhô; abbreviated as MDA) is a self-governing urban development authority in Mymensingh, Bangladesh, responsible for planning, regulating, and implementing the city’s master plan. Established in 2026 by the Government of Bangladesh, the authority oversees urban growth and prepares comprehensive master plans that are periodically reviewed to guide long-term urban development. The MDA operates under the Ministry of Housing and Public Works.
