= Segunbagicha =

Neighbourhood of Dhaka

Segunbagicha সেগুনবাগিচা
- Neighbourhood
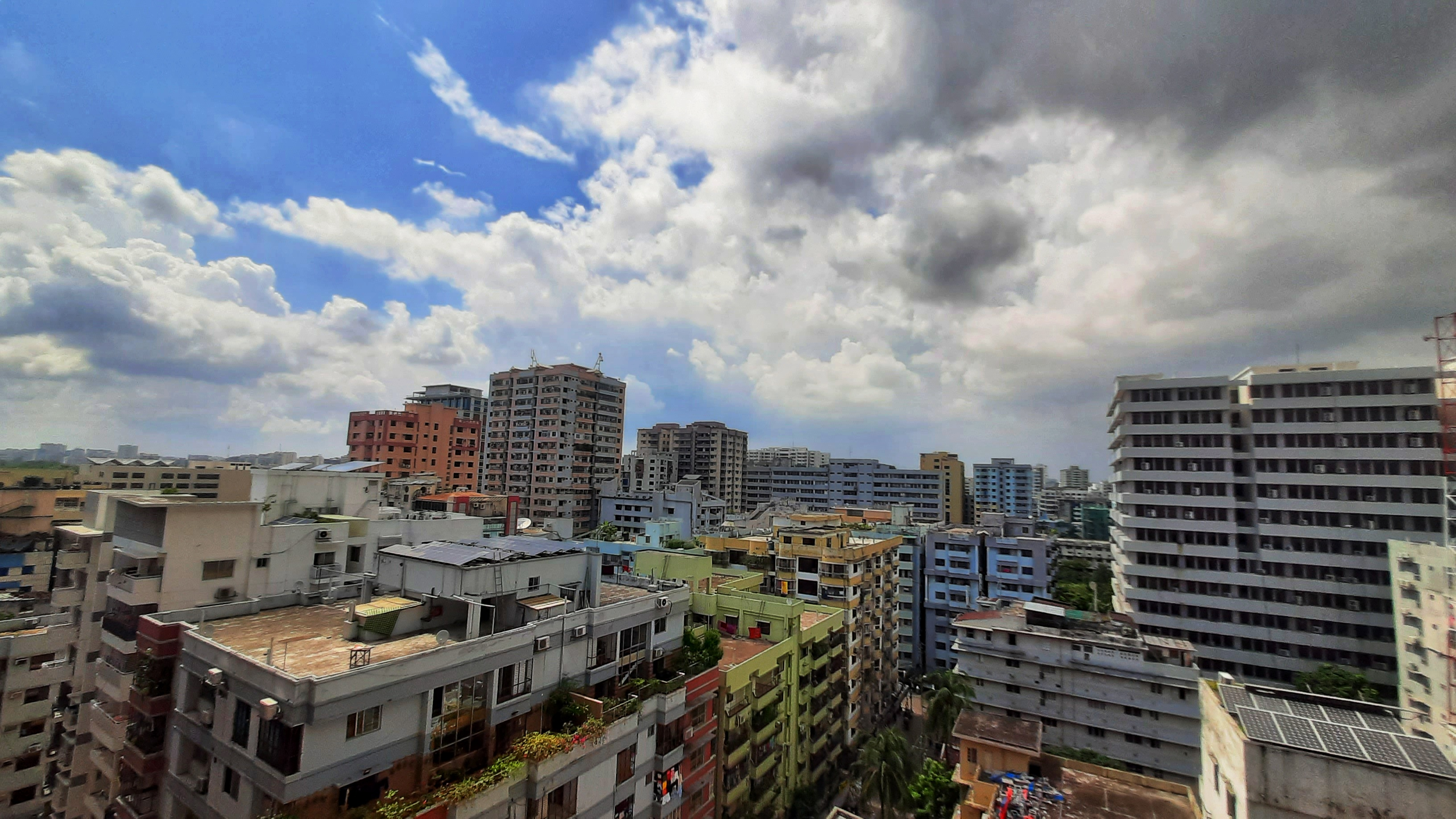
- Skyline of Segunbagicha
- Expandable map of vicinity of Segunbagicha
- Location of Segunbagicha within Dhaka Location of Segunbagicha within Dhaka Division Location of Segunbagicha within Bangladesh
- Coordinates: 23.734032°N 90.4076745°E
- Country: Bangladesh
- Division: Dhaka Division
- District: Dhaka District
- City: Dhaka
- City Government: Dhaka South City Corporation
- Thana: Shahbag
- Ward: Ward No. 20
- Time zone: UTC+6 (BST)
- Postal Code: 1000
- Area codes: +880, +880 2
- Notable sport teams: PWD Sports Club

Segunbagicha (Bengali: সেগুনবাগিচা, romanized: Shegunbagicha, lit. 'Garden of the Teaks') is an upscale residential, administrative, commercial, and institutional neighbourhood in south-central Dhaka, Bangladesh. The neighbourhood is an important area of Dhaka featuring a large number of government and residential complexes. It acts as a bridge between the major thanas of Ramna, Shahbagh, Dhanmondi, Paltan and Motijheel, and is located at the crossroads of Ramna, Shahbag and Paltan thanas.

Segunbagicha is a centre of government office building and institutions including the headquarters of National Security Intelligence, Anti-Corruption Commission (commonly known as duduk; দুদক), Motsho Bhobon (building of Department of Fisheries), Bangladesh Secretariat, the International Mother Language Institute, Bangladesh Shilpakala Academy, the Public Works Department, the Bangladesh Department of Architecture, the Ministry of Foreign Affairs as well as several tax zones.

== History ==
During the British Bengal era, two English officers, Captain Graham and Colonel Stecky built a garden in the area. Among all the plants in the garden, there were numerous teak trees, called segun (pronounced as shegun) in Bengali. The neighbourhood got its name for the teak trees it contained. The responsibility of the area was then handed over to the municipality after the officers moved to another part of Dacca. The municipality then decided to cut down the trees.

In the late 1940s, Segunbagicha was a desolate and solitary area, located on the outskirts of the Dacca city. It was sparsely populated, but it hosted mostly Hindu intellects and used to be a residential colony where many educated doctors, lawyers, teachers and other intellects resided. However, Segunbagicha quickly became occupied due to the influx of migrants. The first Chinese restaurant in Dhaka (then Dacca), "Café China", was set up in the neighbourhood.

According to Bangladeshi writer Qazi Anwar Hossain, there were only a few low-rise buildings in the sparsely populated Segunbagicha in the 1950s. The area also hosted a huge swamp.

Muhammad Ibrahim, a Bangladeshi physician, who later founded the Bangladesh Institute of Research and Rehabilitation in Diabetes, Endocrine and Metabolic Disorders at Shahbagh, set up a tin-shed out-patients clinic in Segunbagicha in the 1950s to fight diabetes.

When the country's founder Sheikh Mujibur Rahman was appointed as the first Bengali chairman of the Pakistan Tea Board, he moved to the erstwhile 115 Segunbagicha. After Mujib was arrested, his family moved to the erstwhile 76, Segunbagicha. After he was released, him and his family moved to Dhanmondi.

Bangladesh Shilpakala Academy, the primary cultural centre of Bangladesh was set up in 1974 in Segunbagicha.

== Etymology ==
Segunbagicha is a junction of two Bengali words, Segun (Bengali: সেগুন, romanised: Shegun), meaning teak (Tectona grandis), which is a species of plant native to South and Southeast Asia and Bagicha (Bengali: বাগিচা, romanised: Bagicha), meaning garden. Therefore, the name "Segunbagicha" literally translates to "The Garden of Teak" or "The Garden of Teak Trees". The naming therefore suggests that this location was once a site of teak trees. But there are still some teak trees in open spaces.

== Geography ==
The coordinates of this area are approximately 23.734032°N 90.4076745°E. To the north of Segunbagicha lies Kakrail of Ramna and to the west lies the Supreme Court of Bangladesh and the iconic Ramna Park. Paltan Thana is to the east of Segunbagicha, of which the Bijoy Nagar-Purana Paltan area borders the area. Areas like Moghbazar, Eskaton, Malibagh, Motijheel, Paltan, Shantinagar, Ramna, Bailey Road, Shahbagh neighbourhood, Siddheswari, Dhaka University campus area, New Market and New Elephant Road are also adjacent to Segunbagicha. Segunbagicha is located in the south-central part of Dhaka and falls under the jurisdiction of Dhaka South City Corporation and is located in Shahbagh Thana, and formerly in Ramna Thana. The area is a part of Word No. 20 of DSCC. It was previously a part of Ward No. 56 of DCC. Segunbagicha is within the boundaries of Dhaka-8 constituency of Bangladesh Jatiya Sangsad.

== Notable institutes ==
=== Government institutions ===
- National Security Intelligence
- Anti Corruption Commission(commonly known as ACC; দুদক)
- Department of Fisheries and Ministry of Fisheries and Livestock
- International Mother Language Institute
- Public Works Department
- Department of Architecture (Bangladesh)
- Ministry of Foreign Affairs (Bangladesh)
- Department of Narcotics Control
- National Press Club
- National Housing Authority
- Bangladesh Secretariat
- Ministry of Education
- Department of Explosives
- Bangladesh Press Council
- Geological Survey of Bangladesh
- Customs Bond Commissionerate (CBC), Dhaka
- Health Economics Unit
- Office of the Controller General of Accounts

=== Cultural centres ===
- Bangladesh Shilpakala Academy
  - National Art Gallery

=== Medical institutions ===
- BIRDEM 2

=== Corporate offices ===
- Gazi Television (GTV)
- Super Star Group
- Techno Drugs Ltd.
- Synovia Pharma, a subsidiary of BEXIMCO Pharmaceuticals
- Credit Rating Information and Services Limited
- Channel S

=== Non-Profit Organizations ===
- Bangladesh Mohila Porishod
- Dhaka Reporters Unity
- Jatiyo Press Club

== Education ==
- Ibrahim Medical College
- Segunbagicha High School
- Ideal Model Government Primary School
- Begum Rahima Ideal Girls High School
- National Academy for Autism and Neurodevelopmental Disabilities
- Dhaka Law College

== Culture ==
Segunbagicha is home to the Bangladesh Shilpakala Academy, perhaps the largest cultural centre in the country.

During Bangla New Year, Segunbagicha bustles with a variety of stalls, people with cultural attires and accessories and splashes of various cultural symbols of Bengal floats all across the neighbourhood.

The prime reason for such attraction of crowds during cultural seasons in this neighbourhood is its strategic location. The area sits on and beside the University of Dhaka, the Ramna Park, the Ramna Race Course (officially the Suhrawardy Udyan), the International Mother Language Institute and the Shilpakala Academy.

== Transportation ==
Important roads like Topkhana Road, Moulana Bhasani Road, Segun Bagicha Road, Abdul Ghani Road and the National Eidgah Street run through and around the neighbourhood.

Segunbagicha has a metro station called Bangladesh Secretariat, which lies on MRT Line 6 of Dhaka Metro Rail on the route from Uttara North towards Motijheel. The station building is located near the Bangladesh Secretariat, Press Club and the Ministry of Foreign Affairs.

== Gallery ==
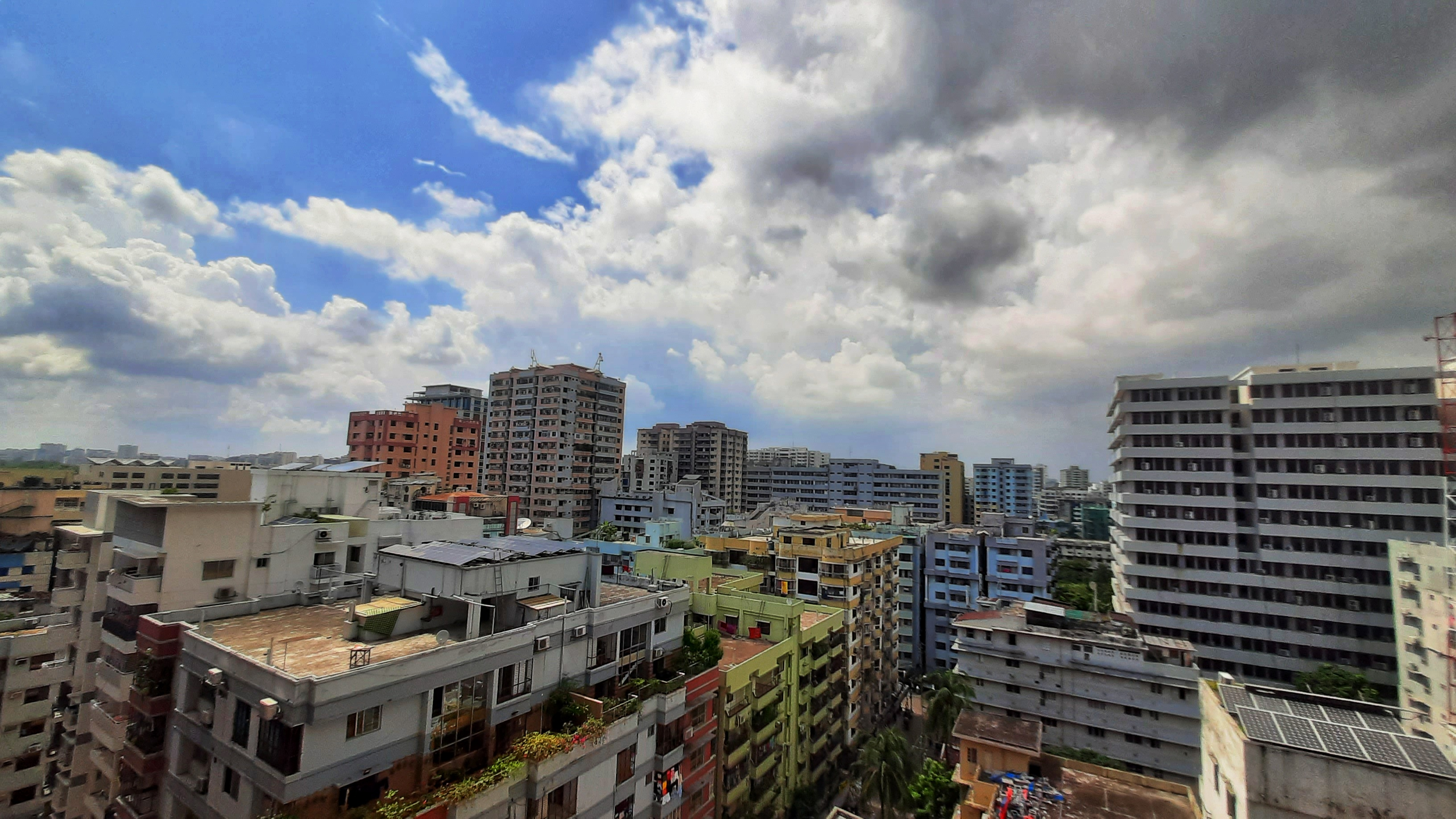
Skyline of Segunbagicha

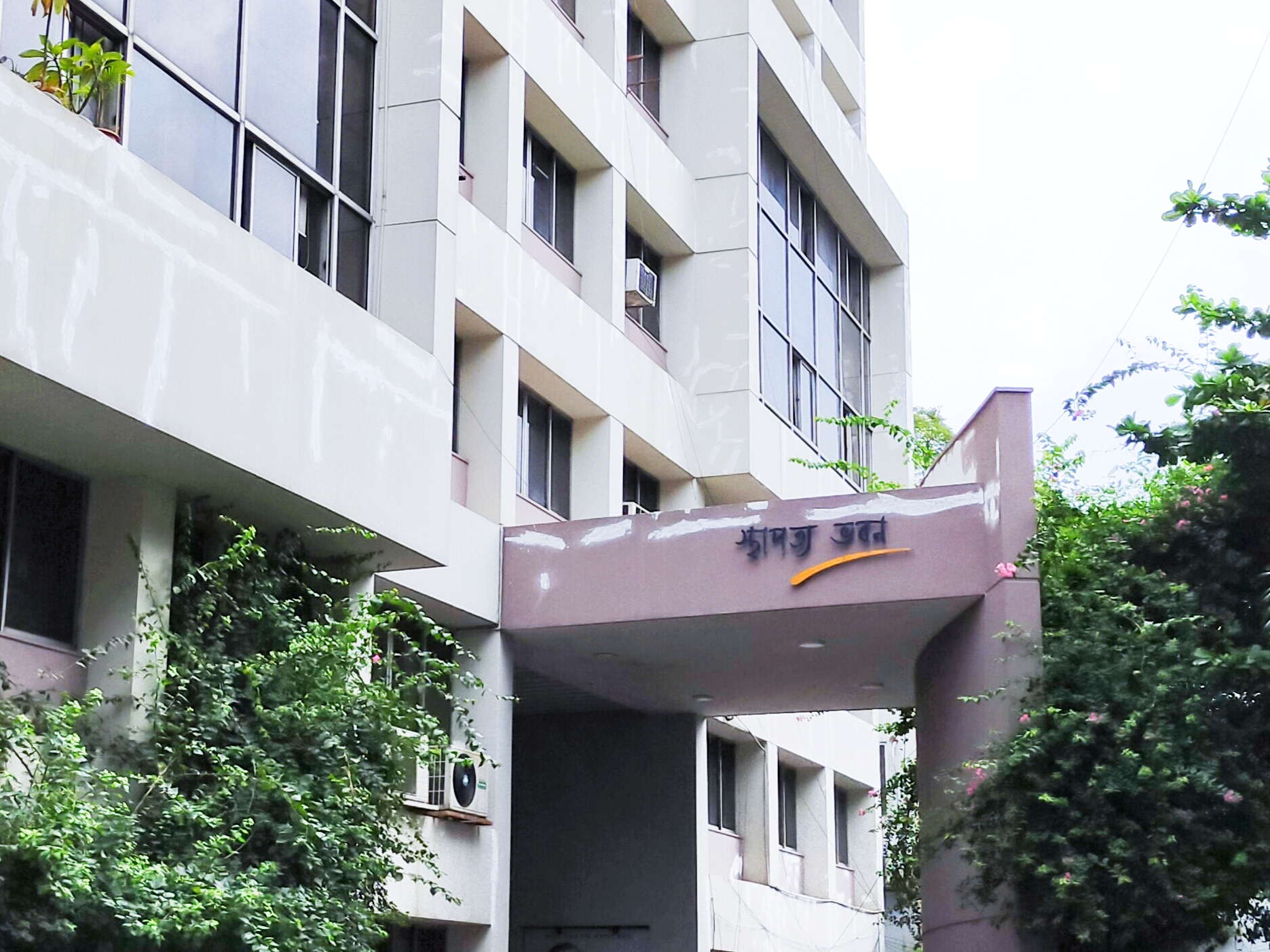
Department of Architecture, HQ

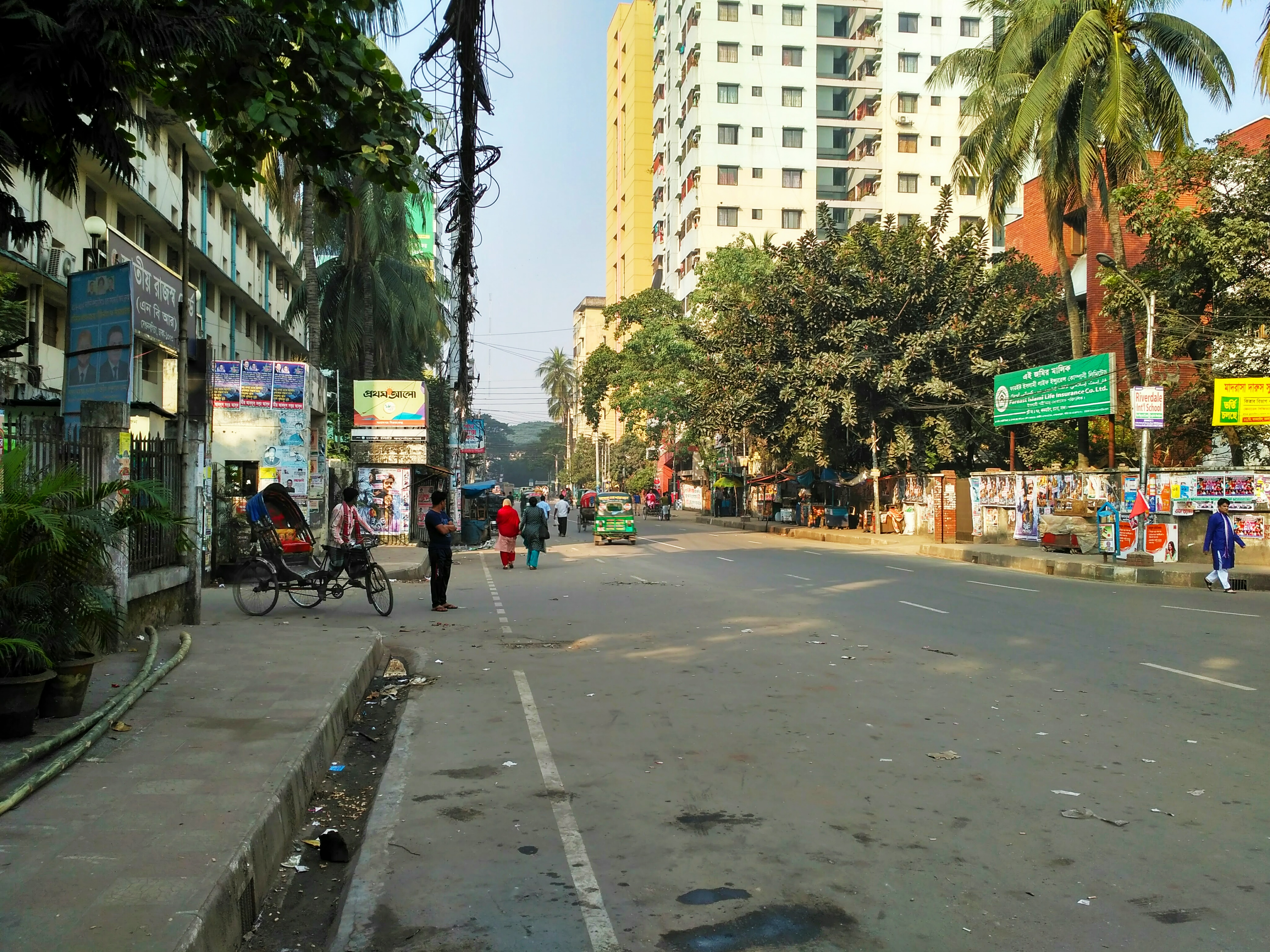
Road in the Segunbagicha-Kakrail area

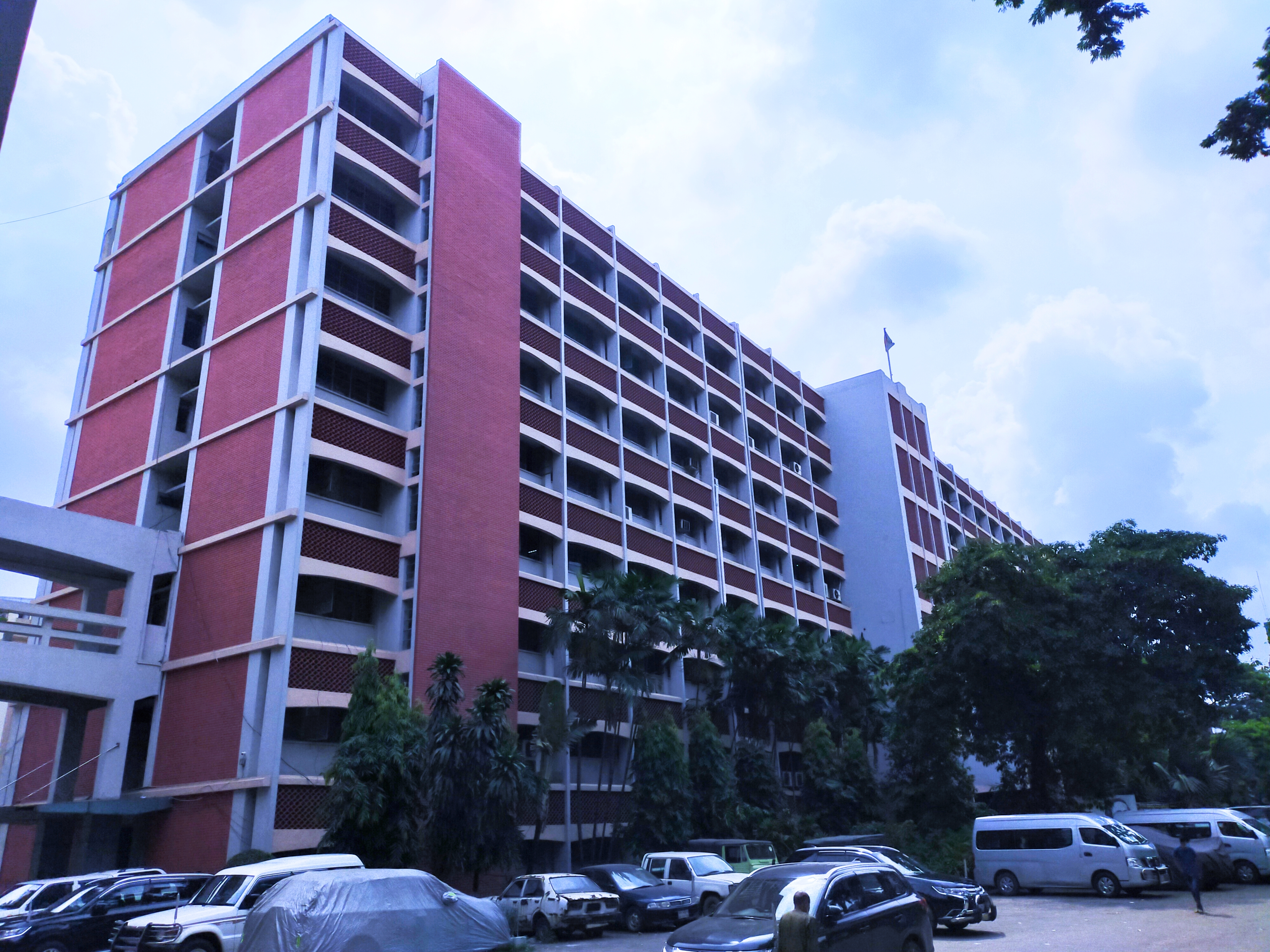
Public Works Department, HQ

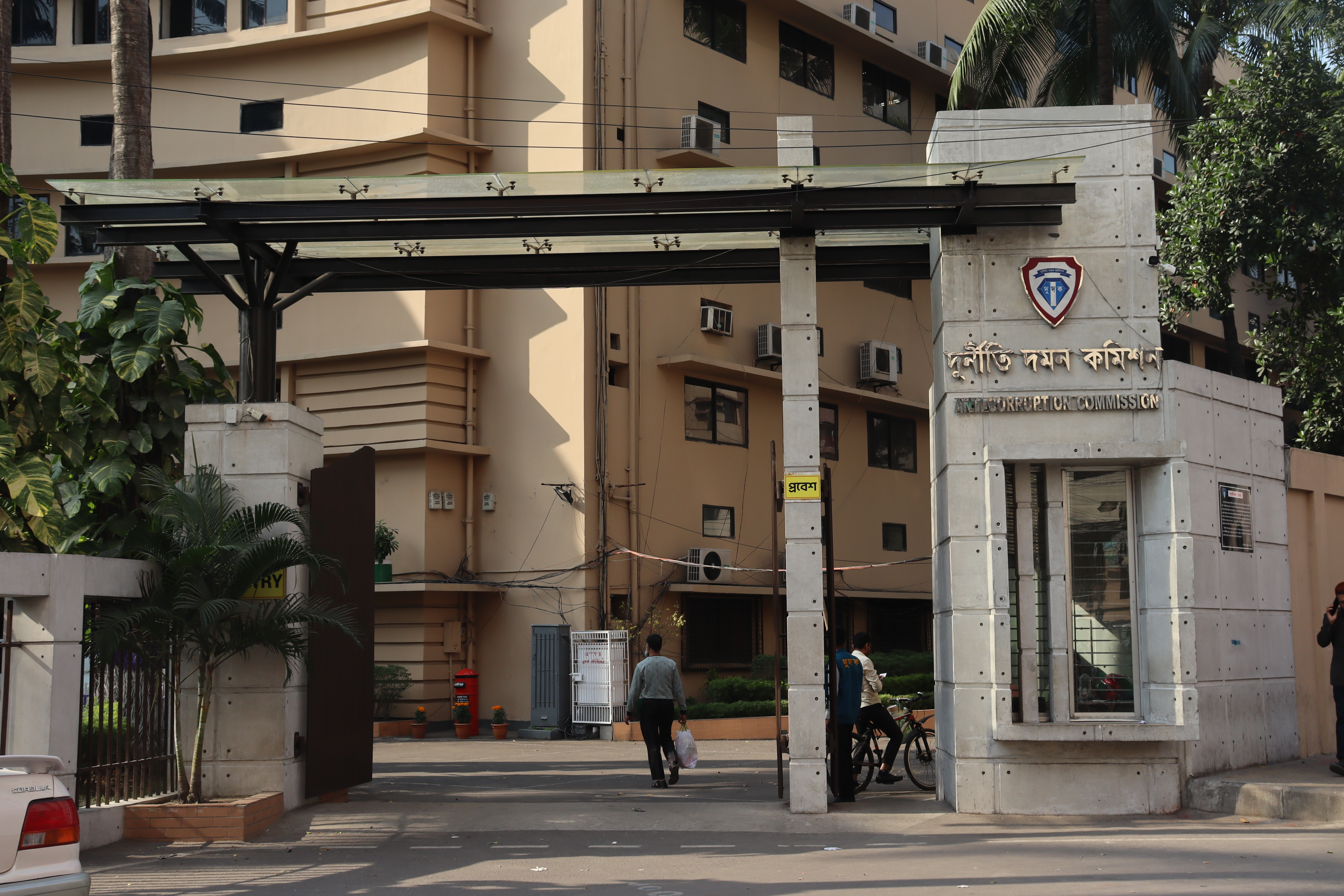
Anti Corruption Commission HQ, Segun Bagicha
