= Directorate of Government Accommodation =

Government Directorate of Bangladesh

- Formation: 1983
- Headquarters: Dhaka, Bangladesh
- Region served: Bangladesh
- Official language: Bengali
- Website: www.doga.gov.bd

Directorate of Government Accommodation (Bengali: সরকারি আবাসন পরিদপ্তর) is a government directorate responsible for looking after government accommodations and state guest houses in Bangladesh and is located in Dhaka, Bangladesh. It is under the Ministry of Housing and Public Works.

== History ==
In 1971 after the Independence of Bangladesh, the Central Estate Office in Dhaka, Estate Office in Dhaka, Regional Estate Office in Chittagong and the Rest Houses were merged to create the Directorate of Government Housing. On 9 November 1983, the four offices were separated and placed in the newly created Directorate of Government Accommodation. It manages the N.A.M. apartments which were constructed for the 2001 NAM (Non-Aligned Movement) conference in Dhaka but are now used to house members of Parliament. The Directorate manages accommodations for government officers in Dhaka and Chittagong, Bangladesh.
