= National Art Gallery (Bangladesh) =

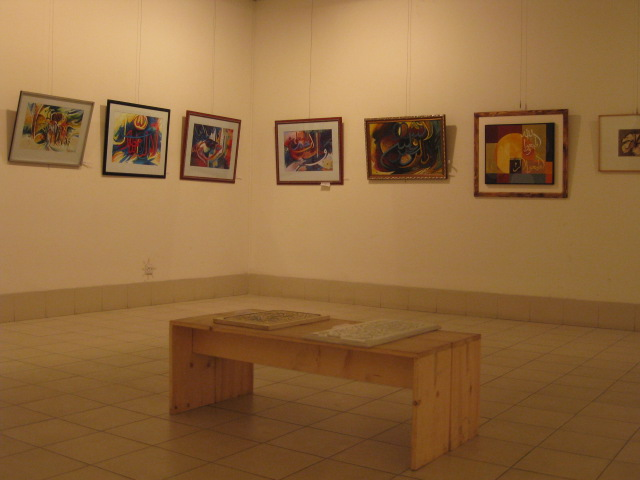
- Established: 1974
- Location: Shilpakala Academy; Segunbagicha, Dhaka, Bangladesh
- Coordinates: 23.7345°N 90.4045°E

The National Art Gallery (Bengali: জাতীয় চিত্রশালা) is a fine arts gallery of Shilpakala Academy in Segunbagicha, Dhaka, Bangladesh. It contains works of art from national artists, such as Zainul Abedin and Quamrul Hassan.

== History ==
In 1974, the Bangladesh Shilpakala Academy, now called the National Academy of Fine and Performing Arts, was established in Bangladesh. The academy became the sole conservationists and protectors of art in 2003 and founded the National Art Gallery.

== Gallery ==
The National Art Gallery's two storied building, constructed on the National Academy of Fine and Performing Art grounds, exhibits ways to prevent aging due to environmental factors and artwork from their permanent and temporary collection. There are also rooms for educational purposes, such as lectures about art preservation.

== See also ==
- List of national galleries
- Madaripur Shilpakala Academy
