= Ministry of Housing and Public Works =

Government ministry of Bangladesh

- গৃহায়ন ও গণপূর্ত মন্ত্রণালয়
- Government Seal of Bangladesh

Ministry overview
- Formed: 1972
- Jurisdiction: Government of Bangladesh
- Headquarters: Bangladesh Secretariat, Dhaka
- Minister responsible: Zakaria Taher Sumon
- Minister of State responsible: Ahammad Sohel Monzoor
- Website: mohpw.gov.bd

The Ministry of Housing and Public Works (Bengali: গৃহায়ন ও গণপূর্ত মন্ত্রণালয়; Gr̥hāẏana ō gaṇapūrta mantraṇālaẏa) is a ministry of the government of Bangladesh responsible for housing policy, urban development, and the design, construction, and maintenance of government buildings.

== Subordinate departments ==
- Public Works Department (PWD)
- Urban Development Directorate (UDD)
- Housing and Building Research Institute (HBRI)
- Department of Architecture
- Directorate of Internal Audit
- Directorate of Government Accommodation
- National Housing Authority (NHA)

=== Development authorities ===
- Rajdhani Development Authority (RAJUK)
- Chattogram Development Authority (CDA)
- Khulna Development Authority (KDA)
- Rajshahi Development Authority (RDA)
- Cox's Bazar Development Authority (CXDA)
- Barishal Development Authority ( BDA)
- Gazipur Development Authority (GDA)
- Sylhet Development Authority (SDA)
- Rangpur Development Authority (RPDA)
- Mymensingh Development Authority (MDA)
- Cumilla Development Authority (CUDA)
- Narayanganj Development Authority (NDA)
