= Department of Explosives =

- Headquarters: Segunbagicha, Dhaka, Bangladesh
- Region served: Bangladesh
- Official language: Bengali
- Website: www.explosives.gov.bd

Department of Explosives (বিস্ফোরক পরিদপ্তর) is a Bangladesh government regulatory agency responsible for regulating commercial explosives in Bangladesh and is attached to the Ministry of Power, Energy and Mineral Resources.

== History ==
Department of Explosives is a government department responsible for regulating commercial explosives and flammable material in Bangladesh. Its headquarters is in Segunbagicha, Dhaka but has regional offices in Barisal, Chittagong, Khulna, Rajshahi, and Sylhet. It establishment was based on the explosives act of 1884.
