= Cumilla Development Authority =

Planning Agency Of Cumilla

- কুমিল্লা উন্নয়ন কর্তৃপক্ষ

Agency overview
- Formed: 2026; 0 years ago
- Superseding agency: Development of Cumilla
- Jurisdiction: Cumilla
- Headquarters: Cumilla, Bangladesh
- Agency executive: Chairman
- Parent department: Ministry of Housing and Public Works
- Parent agency: Government of Bangladesh

The Cumilla Development Authority (Bengali: কুমিল্লা উন্নয়ন কর্তৃপক্ষ, romanized: Kumillā Unnôẏôn Kôrtipôkkhô; abbreviated as CLDA) is a self-governing urban development authority in Cumilla, Bangladesh, responsible for planning, regulating, and implementing the city’s master plan. Established in 2026 by the government of Bangladesh, the authority oversees urban growth and prepares comprehensive master plans that are periodically reviewed to guide long-term urban development. The CuDA operates under the Ministry of Housing and Public Works.
