= National Housing Authority (Bangladesh) =

Bangladesh regulatory agency

- Formation: 15 July 2001
- Headquarters: Segunbagicha, Dhaka, Bangladesh
- Region served: Bangladesh
- Official language: Bengali
- Website: nha.gov.bd

The National Housing Authority (Bengali: জাতীয় গৃহায়ন কর্তৃপক্ষ) is a Bangladesh government regulatory agency under the Ministry of Housing and Public Works.

== History ==
National Housing Authority traces its origins to two different organizations, the Housing and Settlement Directorate and Deputy Commissioner Settlement. After the Partition of India, millions of refugees flowed into Pakistan. The government responded by creating a Housing Wing in the Works, Power, and Irrigation Ministry to provide housing to the refugees and low-income families. In 1971, the Housing Wing was updated to the Housing and Settlement Directorate. In 2000, the Parliament of Bangladesh passed the National Housing Authority Act. The Housing and Settlement Directorate and Deputy Commissioner Settlement were merged to form the National Housing Authority on 15 July 2001.

The agency builds housing for low-income families throughout Bangladesh. The agency also carries out evictions on government land. In 2017, the NHA was constructing 34 housing projects throughout Bangladesh. On 30 January 2019, a former Joint Secretary of the National Housing Authority, Rafiqul Mohammed, was sentenced to five years in jail for forging legal deeds in February 1997 to illegally allot government land.
