= Sylhet Development Authority =

Planning Agency Of Sylhet

- সিলেট উন্নয়ন কর্তৃপক্ষ

Agency overview
- Formed: 2023; 3 years ago
- Superseding agency: Development of Sylhet
- Jurisdiction: Sylhet
- Headquarters: Sylhet, Bangladesh
- Agency executive: Chairman
- Parent department: Ministry of Housing and Public Works
- Parent agency: Government of Bangladesh

The Sylhet Development Authority (Bengali: সিলেট উন্নয়ন কর্তৃপক্ষ, romanized: Silēṭ Unnôẏôn Kôrtipôkkhô; abbreviated as SDA) is a self-governing urban development authority in Sylhet, Bangladesh, responsible for planning, regulating, and implementing the city’s master plan. Established in 2023 by the Government of Bangladesh, the authority oversees urban growth and prepares comprehensive master plans that are periodically reviewed to guide long-term urban development. The SDA operates under the Ministry of Housing and Public Works.

== History ==
The unplanned construction of buildings and structures in and around Sylhet city, which affected its natural beauty and contributed to traffic and urban management problems, prompted the Ministry of Housing and Public Works to draft legislation in 2022 to establish the Sylhet Development Authority, aimed at promoting the planned development of the city. On 22 August of the same year, the fourth Hasina Cabinet, led by then Prime Minister Sheikh Hasina, gave in-principle approval to the draft legislation. The approval was confirmed by then Cabinet Secretary Khandker Anwarul Islam. The Sylhet Development Authority Act, 2023 was passed by the Jatiya Sangsad on 26 October 2023. The Act was published in the official gazette on 23 November of the same year.

Although the Sylhet Development Authority Act was passed in 2023, the authority remained largely inactive, as its organizational structure had not been established and no budget had been allocated. As a result, the authority was effectively non-functional.

On 17 November 2025, the Ministry of Public Works appointed Md. Sadi Ur Rahim Jadid as Executive Director of the Sylhet Development Authority. Earlier, on 8 September of the same year, Md. Ilias Ahmmed, Superintending Engineer of the Sylhet Public Works Circle, had been assigned additional duties as Executive Director.

In June 2026, Rezaul Hasan Kayes Lodi, a former panel mayor of Sylhet, was appointed on a contractual basis as the first chairman of the Sylhet Development Authority.
