= Cox's Bazar Development Authority =

Planning Agency Of Cox's Bazar

- কক্সবাজার উন্নয়ন কর্তৃপক্ষ

Agency overview
- Formed: 2016; 10 years ago
- Superseding agency: Development of Cox's Bazar
- Jurisdiction: Cox's Bazar
- Headquarters: COXDA Bhaban, Cox's Bazar, Bangladesh
- Agency executive: Mohammad Jasim Uddin, Chairman
- Parent agency: Ministry of Housing and Public Works
- Website: www.coxda.gov.bd

Cox's Bazar Development Authority (Bengali: কক্সবাজার উন্নয়ন কর্তৃপক্ষ, romanized: Kôksbājār Unnôẏôn Kôrtipôkkhô; abbreviated as CBDA) is a Government of Bangladesh urban planning authority responsible for the planned development, regulation, and management of Cox's Bazar, Bangladesh. Established in 2016 by the Government of Bangladesh, the authority is responsible for preparing and implementing the city's master plans, regulating urban development activities, and guiding the sustainable development and expansion of the Cox's Bazar urban area. It operates under the Ministry of Housing and Public Works.

== History ==
Cox's Bazar Development Authority was established in 2016 following the passage of an act in the Parliament. Lieutenant Colonel Forkan Ahmad was appointed the first chairman of the authority. The authority is responsible for developing the plans to turn Cox's Bazar into a major tourist city. In 2019, Prime Minister Sheikh Hasina directed the authority to develop a master plan for the development of Cox's Bazar.

In August 2020, Lieutenant Colonel Forkan Ahmad was re-appointed chairman of Cox’s Bazar Development Authority in August 2020 for his third term.

Commodore Mohammed Nurul Absar was appointed chairman of Cox’s Bazar Development Authority in August 2023.

In February 2025, retired additional secretary Mohammad Salahuddin was appointed chairman of the Cox's Bazar Development Authority.
