= Public Works Department (Bangladesh) =

Bangladeshi government department

- Formation: 1948
- Headquarters: Segunbagicha, Dhaka, Bangladesh
- Region served: Bangladesh
- Parent organization: Ministry of Housing and Public Works
- Website: pwd.gov.bd

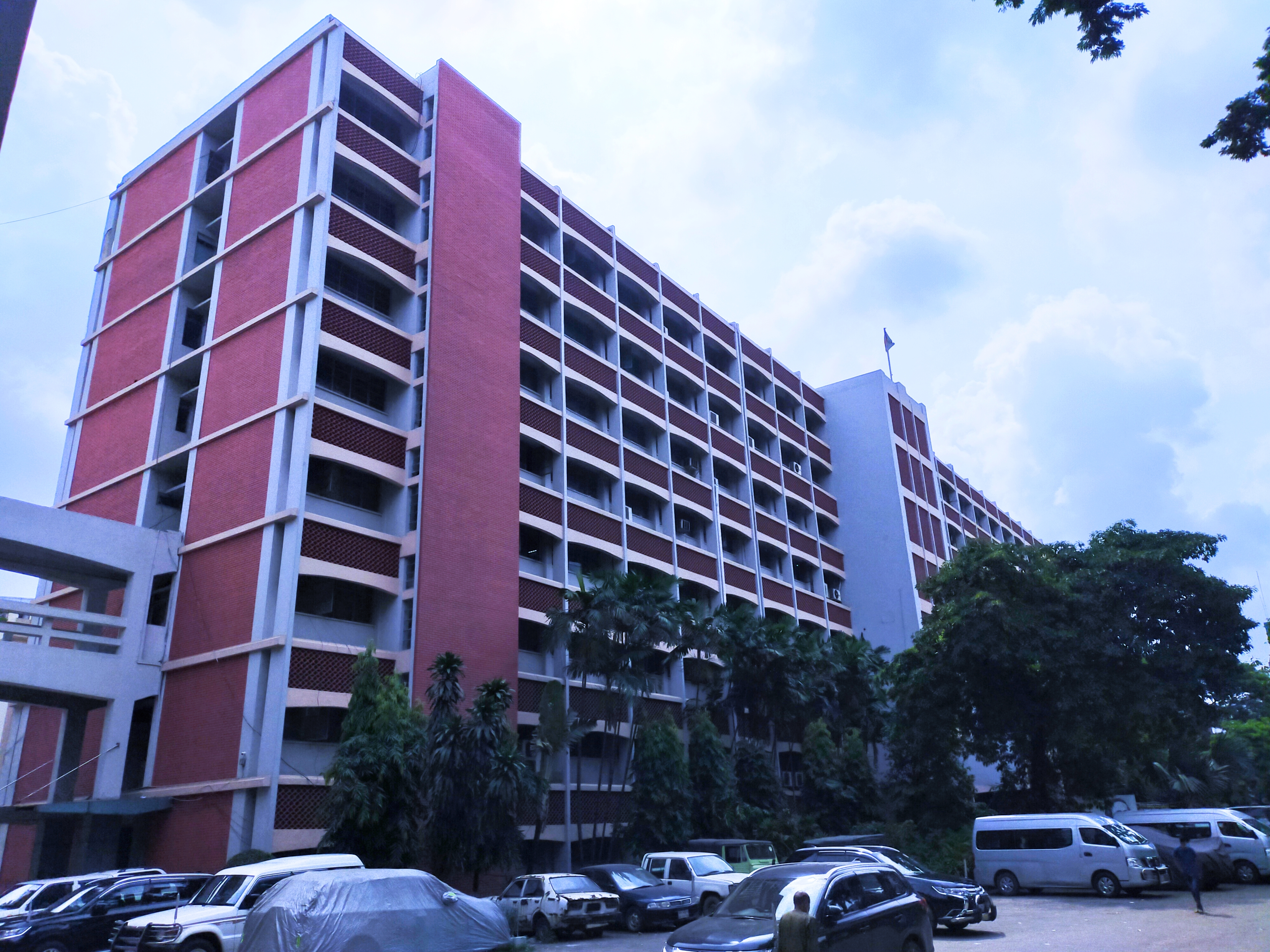
Public Works Department, HQ, Segunbagicha, Dhaka

The Public Works Department (Bengali: গণপূর্ত অধিদপ্তর), also known as PWD, is a government department responsible for the construction of buildings and structures of government organisation and agencies in Bangladesh and is located in Dhaka, Bangladesh. It is under the Ministry of Housing and Public Works. Most of the works done by the department are designed by the Department of Architecture.

== History ==
The Public Works Department was established in 1948 when Bangladesh was a part of Pakistan. It is led by a chief engineer.

== Working area ==
1. Construction and maintenance of government buildings and establishments
2. Ensure proper maintenance and management of government quarantined properties.
3. Maintain the standard and quality of construction materials.
4. Construction and maintenance of other government structures including key point installations.
5. Prepare structural and electromechanical design of government installations.
6. Reconstruction, maintenance and renovation of various monuments and historical buildings.
7. Maintenance and development of public parks.
8. Determining the rate of rent of government offices and residential buildings.
9. Collection of non-tax revenue.
10. Prepare the rate of schedule of civil and electrical/mechanical work.

== See also ==
- PWD Sports Club
