= Rangpur Development Authority =

Planning Agency Of Rangpur

- রংপুর উন্নয়ন কর্তৃপক্ষ

Agency overview
- Formed: 2026; 0 years ago
- Superseding agency: Development of Rangpur
- Jurisdiction: Rangpur
- Headquarters: Rangpur, Bangladesh
- Agency executive: Chairman
- Parent department: Ministry of Housing and Public Works
- Parent agency: Government of Bangladesh

The Rangpur Development Authority (Bengali: রংপুর উন্নয়ন কর্তৃপক্ষ, romanized: Ranpura Unnôẏôn Kôrtipôkkhô; abbreviated as RPDA) is a self-governing urban development authority in Rangpur, Bangladesh, responsible for planning, regulating, and implementing the city’s master plan. Established in 2026 by the Government of Bangladesh, the authority oversees urban growth and prepares comprehensive master plans that are periodically reviewed to guide long-term urban development. The BDA operates under the Ministry of Housing and Public Works.
