= Directorate of Internal Audit (Bangladesh) =

Bangladeshi government directorate

- Formation: 1973
- Headquarters: Dhaka, Bangladesh
- Region served: Bangladesh
- Official language: Bengali
- Website: Directorate of Internal Audit

Directorate of Internal Audit (Bangladesh) (অভ্যন্তরীণ নিরীক্ষা পরিদপ্তর) is a government directorate under the Ministry of Housing and Public Works. It is located in Dhaka, Bangladesh.

The directorate is meant to ensure administrative and financial transparency and accountability of agencies and departments under the Ministry of Housing and Public Works as well as optimal utilization of public funds and resources by preventing misappropriation and misuse.

== History ==
On 9 July 1975 the "Office of the Officer in Charge (Accounts), Ministry of Public Works and Urban Development, Department of Public Works" was formed. Subsequently, the Institutional Format of the Enam Committee of December, 1972 and the Institutional Format of the Martial Law Committee of 15 March 1973 were renamed as "Directorate of Internal Audit".

On 23rd June 2019, the Annual Performance Agreement (APA) for the fiscal year 2019-2020 was signed between the Ministry of Housing and Public Works and various departments and agencies under the ministry. The secretary of the ministry Md. Shahid Ullah Khandaker signed the agreement on behalf of the ministry and the head of the Directorate of Internal Audit on behalf of his directorate.

On 30th June 2021, the Annual Performance Agreement (APA) was signed between the Ministry of Housing and Public Works and various departments and agencies under it. Directorate of Internal Audit also signed APA with the Ministry for all the activities to be carried out in the fiscal year 2021-2022. The head of the Directorate of Internal Audit signed the agreement on behalf of his directorate and the secretary of the ministry Md. Shahid Ullah Khandaker on behalf of the ministry.
