= Barishal Development Authority =

Planning Agency Of Barishal

- বরিশাল উন্নয়ন কর্তৃপক্ষ

Agency overview
- Formed: 2023; 3 years ago
- Superseding agency: Development of Barishal
- Jurisdiction: Barishal
- Headquarters: Barishal, Bangladesh
- Agency executive: Chairman
- Parent agency: Ministry of Housing and Public Works

Barishal Development Authority (Bengali: বরিশাল উন্নয়ন কর্তৃপক্ষ, romanized: Bôriśāl Unnôẏôn Kôrtipôkkhô; abbreviated as BDA) is a Bangladesh government urban planning authority responsible for the planned development, regulation, and management of Barishal, Bangladesh. Established in 2023 by the Government of Bangladesh, the authority is responsible for preparing and implementing the city's master plans, regulating urban development activities, and guiding the sustainable development and expansion of the Barishal urban area. It operates under the Ministry of Housing and Public Works.

== History ==
In 2022, Ministry of Housing and Public Works created a draft act to create Barishal Development Authority. The Barishal Development Authority act 2022 is now hold for the approval. The act passed by the Jatiya Sansad on 12 March 2026.
