= International Mother Language Institute =

Research institute in Bangladesh

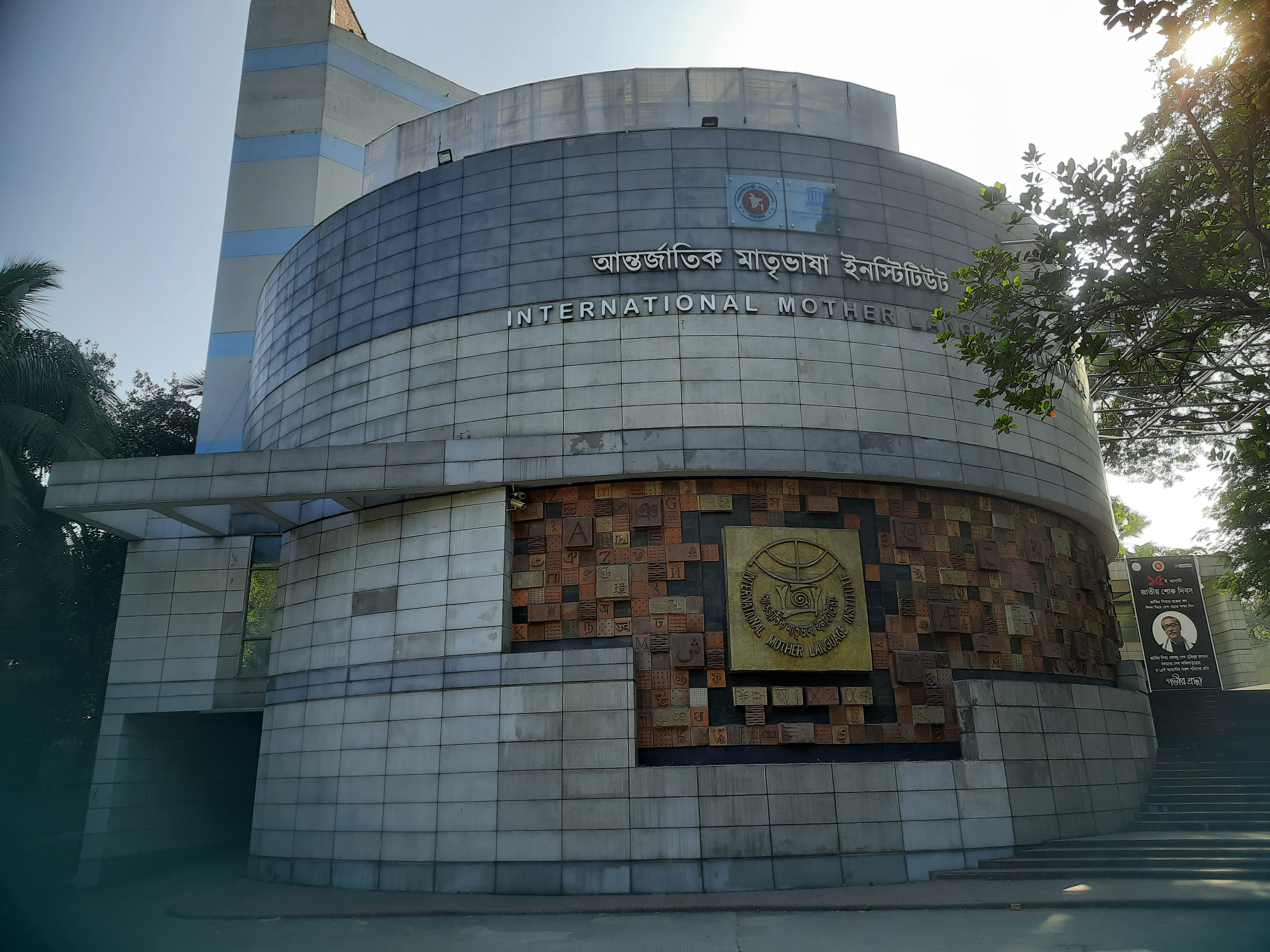
- International Mother Language Institute in Bangladesh
- Founder: Government of Bangladesh
- Established: 21 February 2010
- Mission: Preservation of languages
- Key people: Professor Dr. Mohammad Ashaduzzaman (Director)
- Address: ‍Shaheed captain mansur ali road, 1/Ka, Segun bagicha, Dhaka-1000
- Location: Segun Bagicha, Dhaka, Bangladesh
- Coordinates: 23.7355°N 90.4044°E
- Interactive map of International Mother Language Institute
- Website: imli.portal.gov.bd

The International Mother Language Institute (IMLI, Bengali: আন্তর্জাতিক মাতৃভাষা ইনস্টিটিউট) is a statutory body in Bangladesh whose function is the preservation of languages.

== History ==
Planning for the International Mother Language Institute (IMLI), intended to promote Bangla and preserve endangered languages, began in 1999. It was inaugurated at Segunbagicha, Dhaka, Bangladesh on 15 March 2001.

Construction started on 6 April 2003, stopped with the next change of government, and resumed on 11 February 2008. Six stories of the proposed twelve has been built. It was officially completed on 21 February 2010. In 2015 UNESCO applied Category II Institute status to IMLI.

== Background ==
The Bengali language movement of 1952 and International Mother Language Day are the main inspiration behind the institute.

== Structure ==
There are 40 employees including researchers, officials and employees. Professor Hakim Arif is the present director general.
