= Department of Fisheries (Bangladesh) =

- Formation: 1976
- Headquarters: Segunbagicha, Shahbagh, Dhaka, Bangladesh
- Region served: Bangladesh
- Official language: Bengali
- Website: fisheries.gov.bd

Department of Fisheries (Bengali: মৎস্য অধিদপ্তর) is a Bangladesh government department under the Ministry of Fisheries and Livestock responsible for regulating the fisheries industry in Bangladesh. Kh. Mahbubul Haque is the Director General of the Department of Fisheries.

== History ==
The Department of Fisheries traces its origin to the Department of Fisheries that existed when Bangladesh was part of Pakistan. Following the independence of Bangladesh in 1971, the current Department of Fisheries was established. In April 1975, the Central Fisheries Department was merged with Department of Fisheries. The Central Marine Fisheries Department was merged with the Department of Fisheries in 1984 and became its Marine Fisheries wing.
