= Urban Development Directorate (Bangladesh) =

- Government Seal of Bangladesh

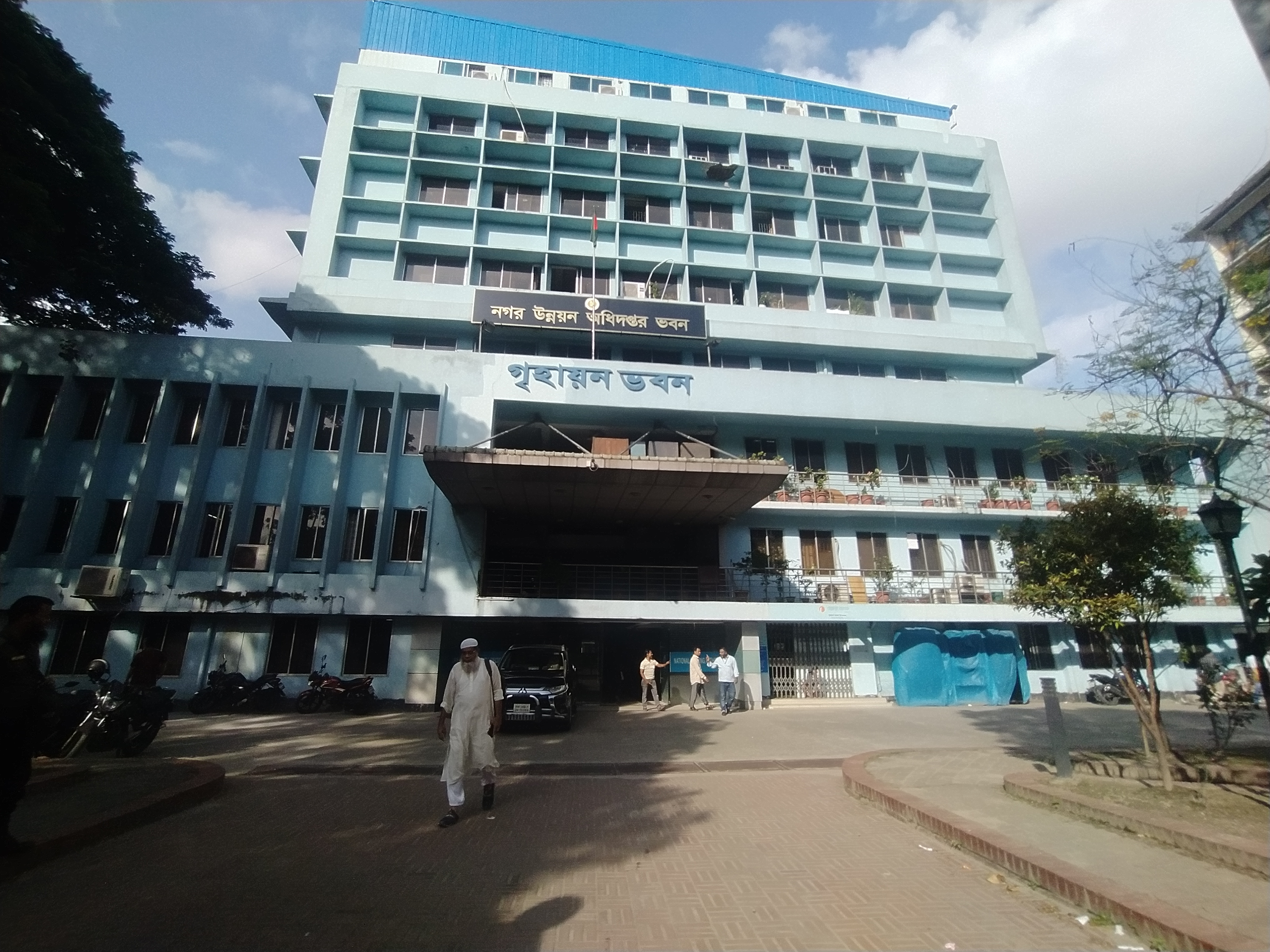
- Urban Development Directorate Building
- Formation: 17 July 1965
- Headquarters: Dhaka, Bangladesh
- Region served: Bangladesh
- Official language: Bengali
- Website: www.udd.gov.bd

The Urban Development Directorate is a Bangladesh government regulatory agency under the Ministry of Housing and Public Works responsible for urban planning. M. Mahmud Ali is the Director of Urban Development Directorate.

== History ==
Urban Development Directorate was established on 17 July 1965 to develop urban areas. In 1983, Brigadier General Enamul Haque Khan led Martial Law Committee on Organizational set up recommended upgrading the department and increasing its responsibilities. It was approved by a review committee led by Major General Atiqur Rahman.
