= Department of Architecture, Universiti Teknologi Malaysia =

Architecture school in Skudai, Malaysia

- Jabatan Senibina, Universiti Teknologi Malaysia
- Other name: Sekolah Senibina Skudai
- Type: Public Institution of Higher Learning
- Established: 1904 - Kuala Lumpur Technical School
- Head of Department: Mahmud b Jusan
- Faculty: 40
- Administrative staff: 5
- Students: 419 fulltime
- Undergraduates: 379 (2011-2012)
- Postgraduates: 30 (2011-2012)
- Doctoral students: 10 (2011-2012)
- Location: Skudai, Johor Bahru, Johor, Malaysia
- Website: sss.utm.my

The Department of Architecture (Malay: Jabatan Senibina), Universiti Teknologi Malaysia (UTM) is the oldest school of architecture in Malaysia. It is one of the five schools under the Faculty of Built Environment. The origin of the school could be traced back to the early days of Kuala Lumpur Technical School, Brickfields Drive, Kuala Lumpur which was established in 1904. Its current reiteration was founded in 1975 in Jalan Gurney, Kuala Lumpur. The school later was moved to its current location in Skudai Campus, Johor during the mass migration into the larger, eventually the main campus of UTM, in 1987.

== Terminology ==
The Department of Architecture is the current, most used term when referring to the entity in its entirety. It is also referred to as the School for short. Previously, the School was the only department under the Faculty of Architecture. As more departments opened under its wings (Department of Town & Regional Planning, Department of Quantity Surveying, Department of Landscape Architecture), the name of the Faculty was changed to the Faculty of Built Environment.

== Academic ==
=== Research center and areas of specialization ===
The School is home to the Center of Built Environment in the Malay World (Malay: Pusat Kajian Alam Bina Melayu) or KALAM. The center was set up in June 1996 on the foundation of numerous intricate measured drawing works done by the students of the Department of Architecture out of concern for the rapid disintegration and elimination of Malaysia's architectural heritage. With the accumulation of these works since 1975 (over 350 buildings documented), the research towards the identification, classification and analysis of the architectural heritage was established through undergraduate and post-graduate studies.

=== Degrees offered ===
At the moment, the School is in the middle of a transition between the current 5 year Bachelor of Architecture (Part 2) programme to the new 3+2 programme. Until the next 3–4 years, it would seem as if the school is offering three different degrees: the Bachelor of Architecture, Bachelor of Science in architecture (3 years Part 1) and Masters of Architecture (2 years Part 2). In fact, the Bachelor of Architecture is being phased out, and not taking anymore students.

All intakes beginning 2012 are as follows:

Degree Title	Duration	Intake Requirement	Accreditation
Bachelor of Science in Architecture	3 Years	STPM, A-levels, International Baccalaureate, Matriculation or equivalent	LAM Part 1
Masters of Architecture	2 Years	LAM Part 1 degree	LAM Part 2

=== Accreditation ===
The Bachelor of Architecture (Hons) (5 Years) Programme in UTM have continued being accredited by the Lembaga Akitek Malaysia (LAM). The latest accreditation visit was successfully received in May 2011, where LAM have granted accreditation of Part 1 and Part 2 to the programme which expires 2015.

The next accreditation visit will review the new 3+2 programme (3 Years Bachelor of Science in Architecture + 2 Years Masters of Architecture). The current 5-year programme will be discontinued and currently no longer offered to new students.

== Competitions and awards ==
The School encourages its students and members to participate actively in various competitions. Below is a list of notable winnings and awards throughout the years.

=== Design competitions ===
==== 2012 ====
- 2nd Prize, PAM Part 1 Design Competition, 24th Architectural Workshop UPM 2012 "PADI".
- 3rd Prize, Exhibition Competition, 24th Architectural Workshop UPM 2012 "PADI".

=== Awards ===
1.Best Institute For Architecture in Malaysia 2016-17 2.Dr.Md Enamul Haque Enan Peace Prize In Architecture

== Student body ==
The Architectural Society of Universiti Teknologi Malaysia (PSUTM), more commonly known as Architech, is the official association of students of architecture in UTM. It was formed in 1984 during the Kuala Lumpur days, and one of the earliest students association to be registered under Office of Students' Affair (HEMA, previously HEP), and is acknowledged as one of the most active students association in UTM.

Its members consist of the entire architecture students population in UTM, where students enrolled in the programme are automatically registered under it unless otherwise requested. Previously it also included students of landscape architecture until they formed their own students society in late 1990s.

The main role of Architech is to manage the welfare of the UTM architecture students, organize events of various forms for the benefits of its members, to become the voice of the students in the school, and ultimately to ensure the advancement of non-academic qualities amongst its members.

Architech is led by its president, democratically elected amongst its members for a term of one year. The president is assisted by the vice president, secretary and treasurer, all of which are democratically elected as well. Together, they will form their government, electing individuals of various skills into official positions where their skills could be harnessed for the benefit of the society. These positions evolve and vary throughout the years as it is needed.
