= Forkan Ahmad =

Retired lieutenant colonel of the Bangladesh Army (born 1959)

Forkan Ahmad (born 21 February 1959) is a retired lieutenant colonel of the Bangladesh Army and former chairman of the Cox's Bazar Development Authority.

== Early life ==
Ahmad was born on 21 February 1959.

== Career ==
The Government of Bangladesh established the Cox's Bazar Development Authority on 6 July 2015 and appointed Ahmed its first chairman. In 2017, he worked on rehabilitation efforts following floods that left half a million people marooned in Cox's Bazar.

Ahmad was re-elected chairman of the Cox's Bazar Development Authority in August 2020 for a third consecutive term. He returned 43 million BDT in surplus funds to the government after completing the construction of the 10-story headquarters of the Cox's Bazar Development Authority. Justices J. B. M. Hasan and Razik-Al-Jalil of the High Court Division summoned Ahmad over not removing illegal structures from the beach per a 2011 High Court verdict following a contempt of court petition filed by Manzil Morshed, president of Human Rights and Peace for Bangladesh. The court removed the contempt of court verdict against him and other officials after accepting a report on the demolition of illegal structures. Mohammed Nurul Absar replaced him as chairman of the Cox's Bazar Development Authority.

Ahmad is a member of the Bhatiary Golf & Country Club.
