= Rezauddin Stalin =

- রেজাউদ্দিন স্টালিন
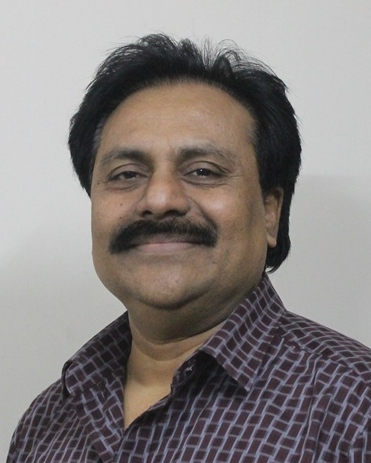
- Stalin in 2015

Director General of Bangladesh Shilpakala Academy
- Incumbent
- Assumed office 21 September 2025
- Prime Minister: Muhammad Yunus (as Chief Adviser); Tarique Rahman
- Preceded by: Abul Foyez Md Alauddin Khan

Personal details
- Born: 1962 (age 63–64) Jessore, East Pakistan, Pakistan
- Education: University of Dhaka
- Occupation: Poet, television personality

Rezauddin Ahmed Stalin (born 22 November 1962) is a Bangladeshi poet and a television personality. He is the current Director General of Bangladesh Shilpakala Academy since September 2025.

Stalin was awarded 2005 Bangla Academy Literary Award in the poetry category.

== Background ==
Rezauddin Stalin was born in 1962 in Nalbhanga village of Jhenaidah in the then East Pakistan (now Bangladesh). He published his first poem, "Shapath", at the age of eight. He graduated from the University of Dhaka.

== Career ==
Stalin started his career in journalism and cultural activities.

Stalin served as a deputy director of the Nazrul Institute in 2009. He also served as a member of the National Poetry Council.

Stalin's poetry has been translated into English, Hindi, Russian, German, Chinese, Japanese, and French.

== Literary works ==
Stalin's book, "Selected Poems”, a compilation of selected poetry translated into English, was launched on 24 May 2017.
