= Department of Architecture (Bangladesh) =

Bangladesh governmental department

Department of Architecture; স্থাপত্য অধিদপ্তর
- Formation: 1952
- Headquarters: Segunbagicha, Dhaka, Bangladesh
- Region served: Bangladesh
- Official language: Bengali
- Website: architecture.gov.bd/

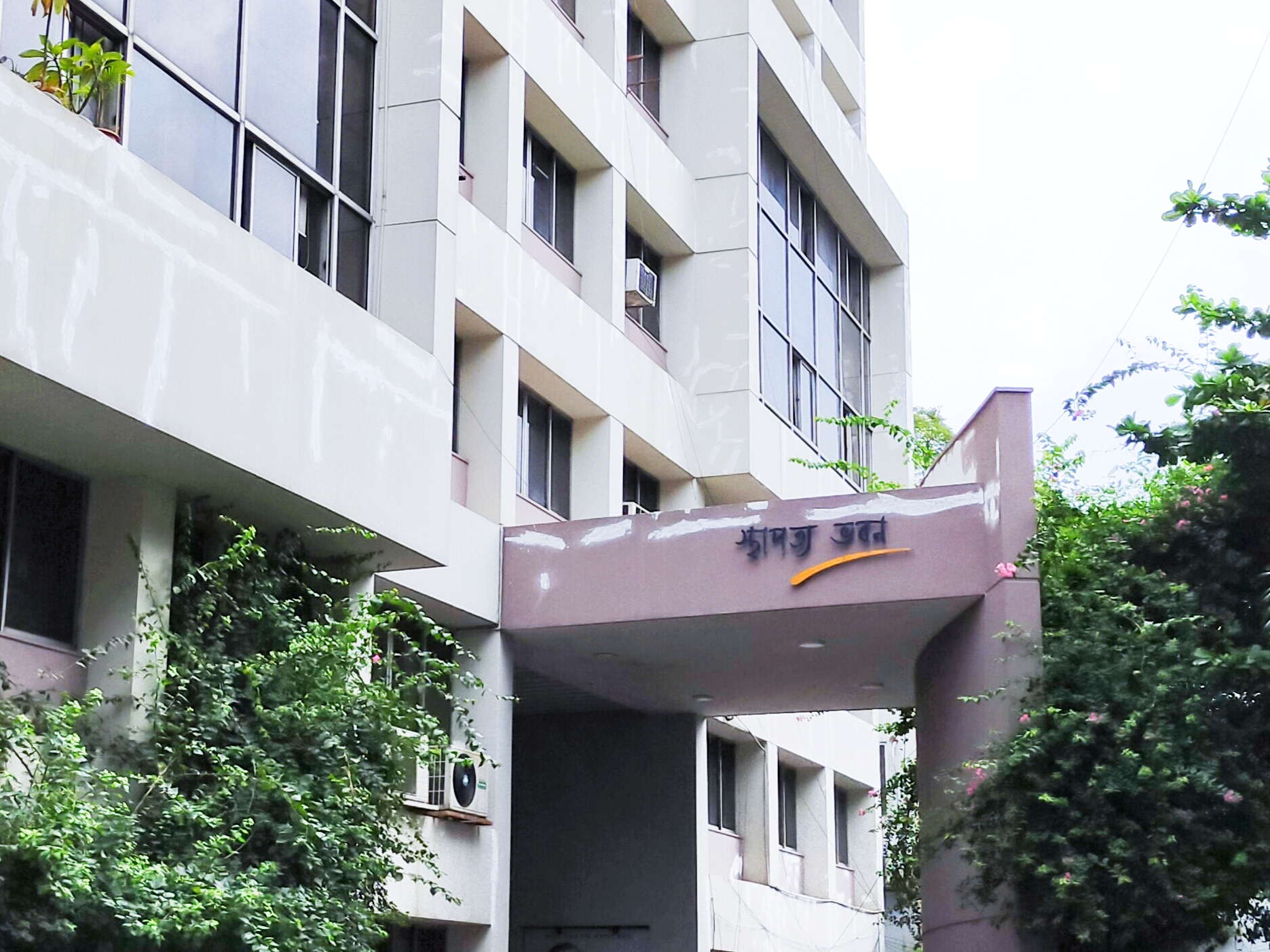
Department of Architecture, HQ, Segunbagicha, Dhaka

Department of Architecture (Bengali: স্থাপত্য অধিদপ্তর) is a government department under the Ministry of Housing and Public Works in Bangladesh. The Department of Architecture is the only Government organization to impart architectural services under the Ministry of Housing and Public Works and responsible for designing all government buildings and public housing schemes across the country. The Department not only prepares architectural designs and layout plans for public building and housing projects but also advises the Government on policy matters relating to human settlement and land use planning. It also offers advice/ recommendation/assistance with respect to master plans, architectural plans, environmental conservation work, general architectural services, etc., related to different projects as per the requirements of different government ministries, departments, directorates, and corporations, etc.

It is located in Segunbagicha, Dhaka, Bangladesh. Manzurur Rahman is the chief architect of the department.

== History ==
Department of Architecture was established in 1952 through the Principal Architect Construction Act of 1952. It is led by a chief architect. In 2013, following the Rana Plaza disaster the department was given the responsibility to improve safety.
