= Bangladesh Shilpakala Academy =

Bangladesh cultural center

- বাংলাদেশ শিল্পকলা একাডেমি
- Seal of Bangladesh Shilpakala Academy
- Formation: 19 February 1974; 52 years ago
- Founder: Sheikh Mujibur Rahman
- Type: Governmental organization
- Location: Segunbagicha, Shahbagh Thana, Dhaka
- Director General: Rezauddin Stalin
- Parent organization: Ministry of Cultural Affairs
- Website: shilpakala.gov.bd

Bangladesh Shilpakala Academy, known as Shilpakala Academy, is the principal state-sponsored national cultural centre of Bangladesh. It is an academy of fine and performing arts, established on 19 February 1974 under the Bangladesh Shilpakala Academy Act. The academy has branches in all 64 districts of Bangladesh to promote cultural activities and foster artistic development at the regional level.

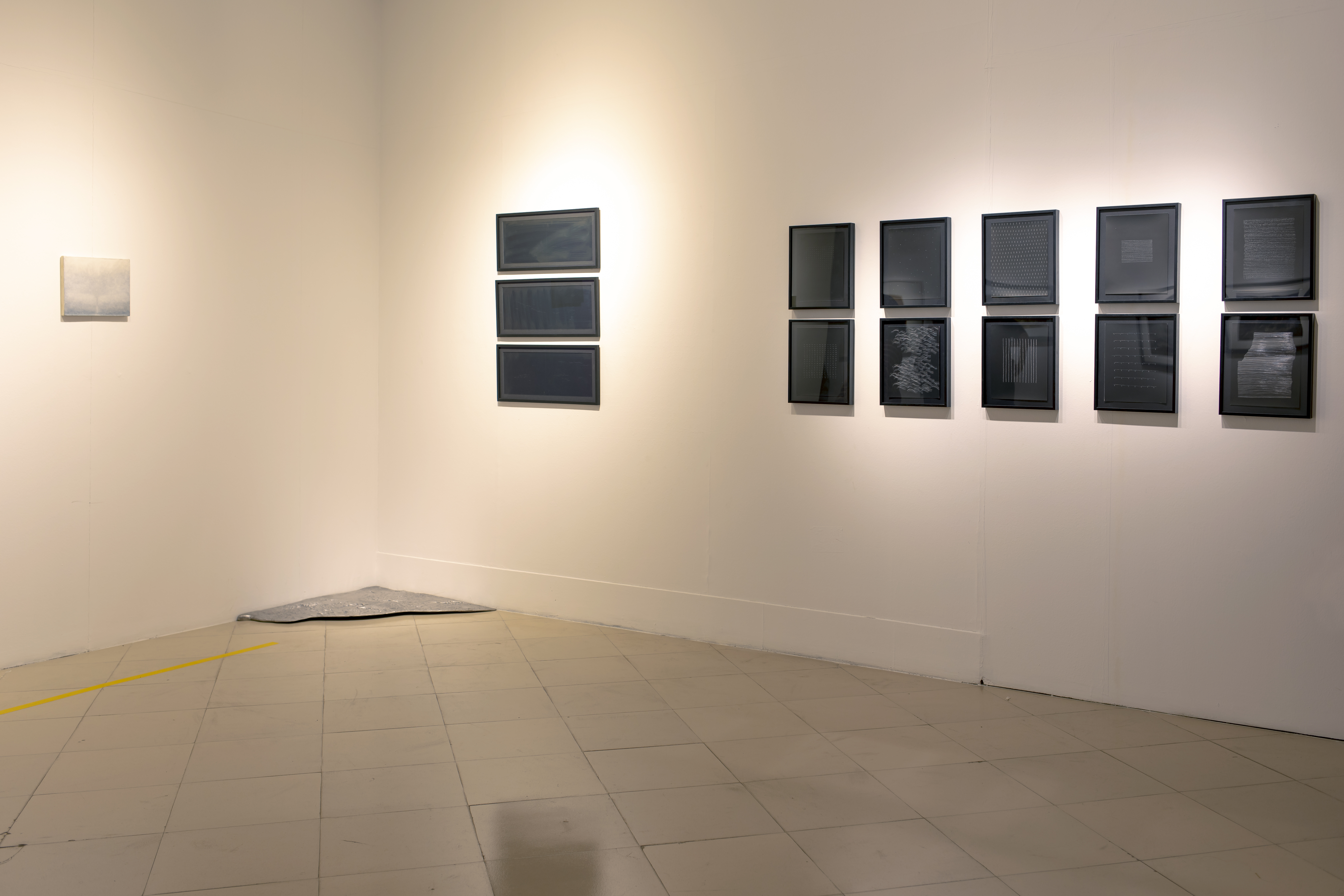
Dhaka Art Summit 2023, Bangladesh Shilpakala Academy

== History ==
It is the national academy of fine and performing arts. The academy was established through an act of Parliament in 1974 as a statutory organization under the Ministry of Cultural Affairs. But subsequently the Act of 1974 of Bangladesh Shilpakala Academy was amended through a new act of parliament in 1989. The academy is headed by a director general.

The overall direction for the functioning of the academy is provided by an Executive Council (Shilpakala Academy Parishad) headed by the minister in charge of the Ministry of Cultural Affairs. The director general of the academy, Liaquat Ali, is responsible for its administration. He is also responsible for the implementation of decisions taken by the council. He is assisted in his work by an executive committee that is elected by the council. Mini Karim is the director for arts, appointed in 2020. The duties and responsibilities of the academy include promotion of the arts and national culture and creation of necessary facilities for their development. The activities of the academy also include organizing workshops, seminars, discussion meetings, and short-term specialized trainings; providing scholarships and financial grants for talented artists; and organizing competitions in the various fields of fine and performing arts.

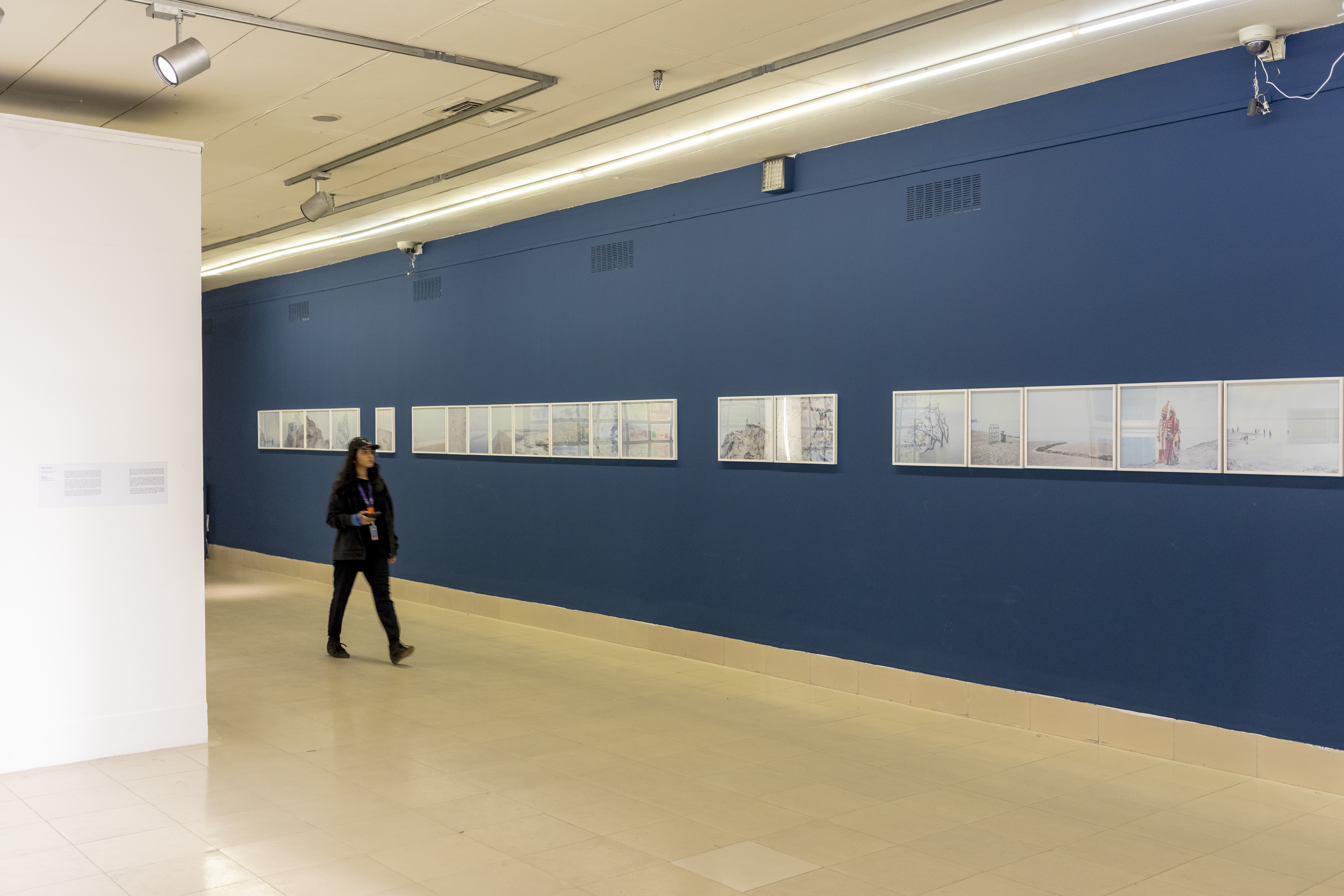
To Enter the Sky - Protick Sarker, Dhaka Art Summit 2023, Bangladesh Shilpakala Academy, Dhaka

== District branches ==
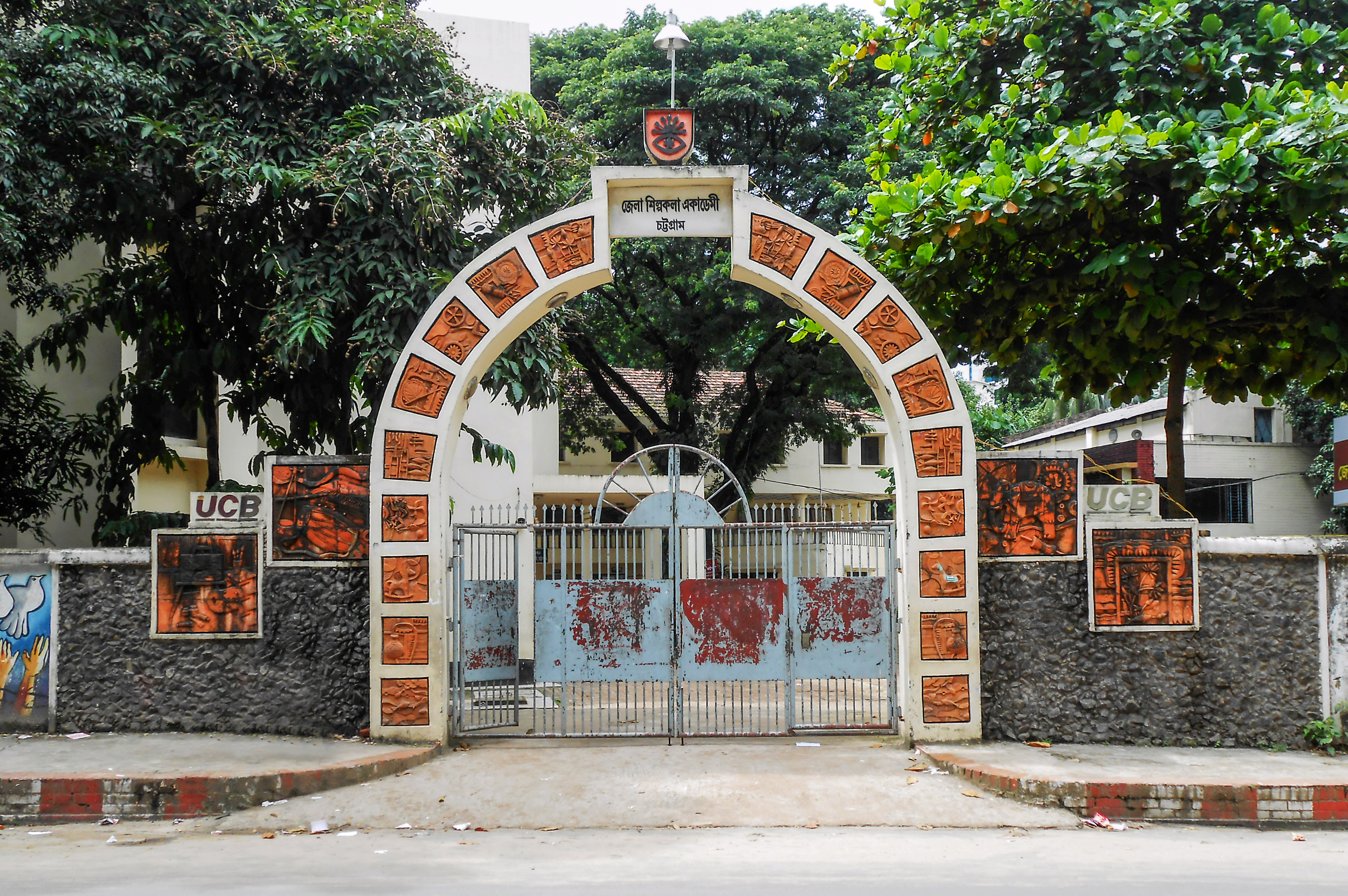
Chittagong Shilpakala Academy main entrance

To extend its reach throughout the country, the academy has set up branches in most districts. The branches arrange district-level festivals, programs, and training in various fine and performing arts.

The branch in Chittagong, Bangladesh's second largest city and headquarters of the eponymous district, grew out of the private-sector art gallery Chattagram Kalabhaban. The gallery was founded by artist and professor Rashid Choudhury in 1972, two years before the national academy came into being.

== See also ==
- National Art Gallery (Bangladesh), founded by the academy
