= List of Bangladeshi photographers =

This is a list of Bangladeshi photographers, people from or associated with Bangladesh and are notable for their excellence in the field of photography:

== A ==
- Aftab Ahmed
- Gazi Nafis Ahmed
- Naib Uddin Ahmed
- GMB Akash
- Taslima Akhter
- Shahidul Alam
- Abdul Momin

== B ==
- Manzoor Alam Beg
- Andrew Biraj

== G ==
- Hasan Saifuddin Chandan

== H ==
- Amanul Haque
- Mohammad Rakibul Hasan
- Anwar Hossain
- Mohammad Ponir Hossain

== K ==
- Sayeeda Khanam

== M ==
- Nasir Ali Mamun

== P ==
- Sarker Protick

== R ==
- Probal Rashid

== S ==
- Jashim Salam
- Bijon Sarkar

== T ==
- Rashid Talukder

== W ==
- Munem Wasif

== Z ==
- Munir Uz Zaman
