= Bangladeshi art =

Bangladeshi art is a form of visual arts that has been practiced throughout the land of what is now known as Bangladesh. Bangladeshi art has a perennial history that originated more than two thousand years ago and is practiced even to this date. Among the various forms of Bangladeshi art, photography, architecture, sculpture, and painting are the most notable.

== History ==
The recent excavations of the artifacts in the archaeological site of Wari-Bateshwar indicate that the history of Bangladeshi art dates back to 450 BC. However, more research is being carried out in this regard as these excavations conflict with the earlier notions about the existence of early urban civilization in Bangladesh. Proper evidence about the earliest development of Bangladeshi art refers to the Mauryan age. A number of sculptures have been discovered in Bangladesh, which reflect the rich heritage of Mauryan art.

The most significant development of Bangladeshi art took place during the Pala rule, which existed from 750 to 1174 CE. The Palas created a distinctive form of Buddhist art in Bangladesh, which even influenced the Chinese, Japanese, Eastern Asian, and Tibetan art. This progress of Bangladeshi art continued to some extent during the Sena rule through the 11th and 12th centuries.

Bangladeshi art witnessed the influence of Islamic art through the arrival of Muslims in Bengal beginning in the 11th century. This influence started through the establishment of the Sultanate of Bengal, which covered most of the area of present-day Bangladesh. However, Islamic art in Bangladesh mostly flourished during the Mughal rule. The Muslim dynasties mainly contributed to the architectural field. A huge influence of Islamic architecture can be seen in numerous mosques, shrines, and mazars located throughout Bangladesh.

A new wave of evolution was introduced in Bangladeshi art through the pervading of British rule. The British left their impact in almost every field of visual arts in Bangladesh. Bangladeshi art was bolstered through the introduction of modern art. This period also gave birth to many famous artists in Bangladesh, including the great artist Zainul Abedin.

== Photography ==
Photography is the contemporary art form where Bangladesh has really made its mark. The early work was done by the pioneers like Golam Kasem Daddy, Manzoor Alam Beg, Nowazesh Ahmed, and Naibuddin Ahmed. Sayeeda Khanom was one of the first women photographers. Anwar Hossain brought about a shift through strong humanistic work in the late 1970s. Documentary photography practice was pioneered by Shahidul Alam, who went on to set up the Drik Picture Library, Pathshala, the South Asian Media Institute; now considered one of the finest schools of photography in the world, Chobi Mela; the highly regarded biannual festival of photography and the Majority World Agency. Mohammad Rakibul Hasan has a great contribution in contemporary photo media.

Women photographers have also taken up the profession, with Taslima Akhter and Jannatul Mawa working on sustained personal projects. However, while Bangladeshi photography is celebrated worldwide, within Bangladesh it has not been sufficiently recognised. It is taught neither at the Faculty of Fine Arts (Charukala Institute) nor at the Department of Fine and Performing Arts (Shilpakala Academy). The entry rules of the Asian Art Biennale do not allow the submission of photography or video, though international artists have submitted photography and have been awarded for it.

Shahidul Alam's book My journey as a witness was the first of a set of 40 books on Bangladeshi fine art to be brought out by the Italian publisher Skira jointly with the Bengal Foundation. Books by Kazi Ghiasuddin, Shafiuddin Ahmed, and the great artist Zainul Abedin have since been published.

== Architecture ==
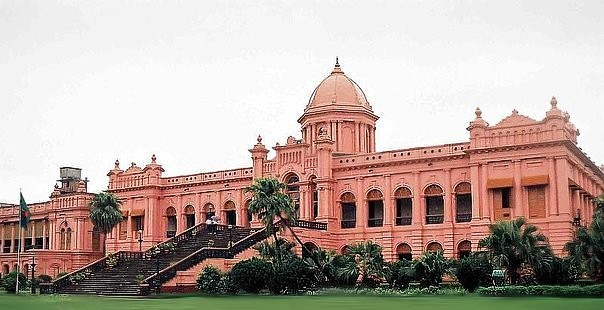
Ahsan Manzil, influenced by Indo-Saracenic architecture

The remains of the ancient archaeological sites bear ample testimony to the fact that the art of architecture was practiced in Bangladesh from the very early period of her history. The Somapura Mahavihara, a creation of the Pala ruler Dharmapala, at Paharpur, Bangladesh, is the largest Buddhist Vihara in the Indian subcontinent, and has been described as a "pleasure to the eyes of the world."

The Kantajew Temple in Dinajpur, built in navaratna style, contains one of the finest examples of terracotta ornamentation of the late period of the art.

The Sixty Dome Mosque in Bagerhat has been described as "the most impressive Muslim monument in the whole of the Indian subcontinent." The Lalbagh Fort is considered one of the greatest examples of Mughal architecture.

The influence of European architecture is also noticeable in several colonial monuments and churches in the country. The most significant one is Ahsan Manzil, the former residence of the Nawabs of Dhaka, later turned into a museum.

In a modern context, Bangladeshi architecture has become more diversified, comprising reflections of contemporary architectural attributes, aesthetic artistry, and technologically advanced forms. Since the inception of Bangladesh, economic advancement has boosted the architecture from its traditional forms to contemporary context. With the growing urbanization and modernization, the architectural form is becoming modern, covering a wide range of its heritage and tradition.

== Sculpture ==
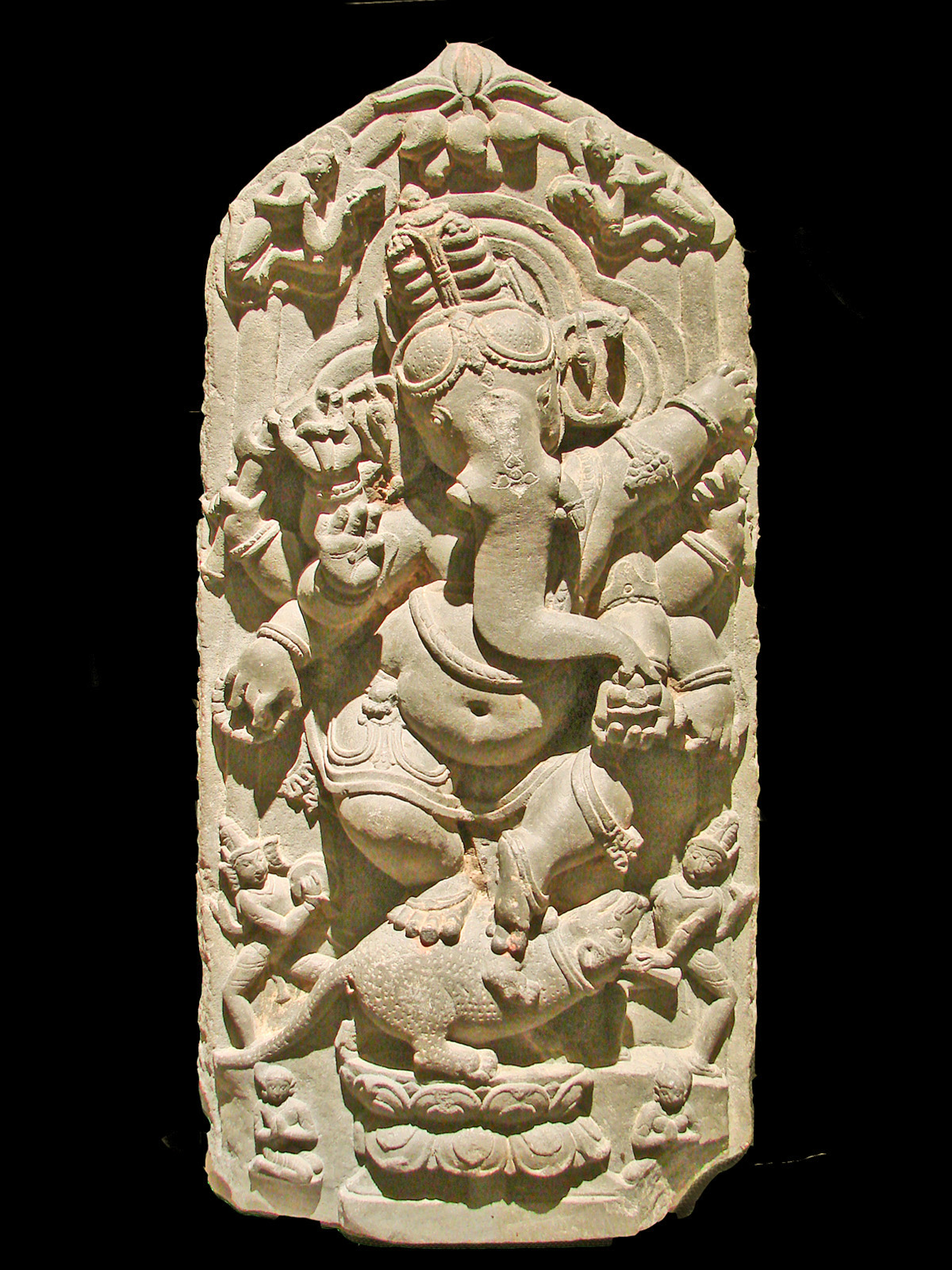
Dancing Ganesha sculpture from Northern Bangladesh, 11th century CE

Unlike other parts of the Indian subcontinent, the art of sculpture in Bangladesh started through the molding of terracotta because of the dearth of stone relief and abundance of the soft alluvial clay. This dates back to the 3rd/2nd century BC.

In the course of time, the influence of north and central India began to grow in the sculptural art of Bangladesh, and the introduction of stone sculpting started. From the early three centuries of the common era, the local sculptors started to make black stone sculptures in the Kusana style, native to northern India. These sculptures were the images of the deities worshiped by the followers of the three major religions of the time, namely, Brahmanism, Buddhism, and Jainism.

Bronze sculptures began to be assimilated in the 7th century AD, primarily from the Chittagong region. The earliest sculptures of this kind were depictions of Buddhist beliefs, but the art was later integrated into the Hindu art as well.

In modern times, the theme of sculptural art has been dominated by some historical events, mainly the Bangladesh liberation war. Aparajeyo Bangla and Shabash Bangladesh are some of the noteworthy examples of this trend.

== Folk art ==
As in other countries of the world, the people of rustic and primitive ideas developed folk art in Bangladesh. Because of this, the structure and growth of the folk-art of Bangladesh are filled with pure and simple vigor and the symbolic representations of hope, aspiration, and sense of beauty of the rural Bangladeshi folk. The environment and the agricultural activities greatly helped to enrich the traditional folk-art of Bangladesh. It uses traditional motifs reflecting the land and its people. Different forms of folk art tend to repeat these common motifs. For instance, the lotus, the sun, the tree-of-life, flowery creepers, etc., are seen in paintings, embroidery, weaving, carving, and engraving. Other common motifs are fish, elephants, horses, peacocks, circles, waves, temples, mosques, etc. Many of these motifs have symbolic meanings. For example, the fish represents fertility, the sheaf of paddy prosperity, and the lotus likewise. Another important factor that has influenced the art and culture of this land is the six seasons.

The folk art of Bangladesh has been largely contributed by the rural women because of the aesthetic value as well as the quality of their work. A key reason behind it was that in most cases their art has been non-commercial, whereas the folk art produced by men has a commercial value attached to it. Thus, artists like blacksmiths, potters, cobblers, painters, goldsmiths, brass-smiths, and weavers earn their livelihood from what they produce, while traditionally, in the past, Alpana artists or Nakshi kantha needlewomen were working within their homes and received no monetary recompense for their labour. Both Alpana and Nakshi kantha are some of the most attractive forms of Bangladeshi folk art. Pottery and ivory are also some popular forms of the art.

== Performing arts ==
Performing arts in Bangladesh has a rich tradition. From ancient times, Jatra, Baulsong, Gombhira, etc. were presented through singing, dancing, and play-acting.

In the 1990s, performance art was introduced as a medium to Bangladesh.

== Modern art ==
The movement of modern art in Bangladesh has its roots in the early 20th century. Back then there was no training or educational institution for arts in Bangladesh. In the late 19th century, the British started to establish art schools in Calcutta, then the provincial capital of Bengal, which inspired the local art admirers to pursue a particular form of art. The art lovers of Bangladesh, or erstwhile East Bengal, were also induced by this. This phenomenon gave birth to many preeminent figures of arts in Bangladesh whose fame not only spread through Bangladesh but also the whole world. Zainul Abedin was from this generation of artists. He is considered the pioneer of the art movement in Bangladesh.

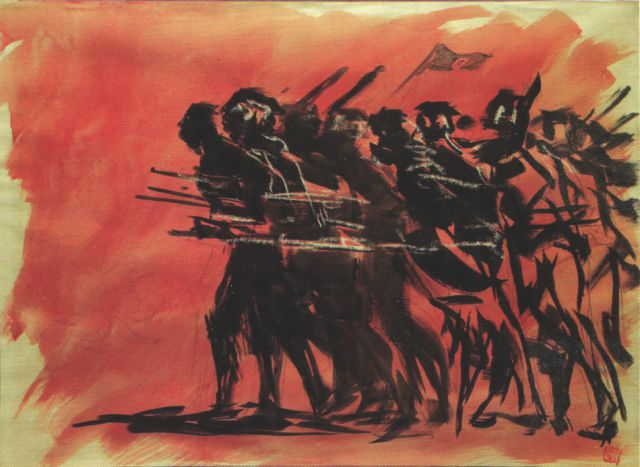
Liberation War by Zainul Abedin

After the partition of India, Calcutta became a part of West Bengal in India, while the current geographical area of Bangladesh formed the East Pakistan province of Pakistan. Hence, the local artists felt a dire need of an art institution in Bangladesh. In 1948, Zainul Abedin, along with other leading local artists like Quamrul Hassan, Safiuddin Ahmed, Anwarul Huq, Khawaja Shafique, established the Government Institute of Arts and Crafts to evolve the art tradition in Bangladesh.

Since the establishment of the art institute, the artists in Bangladesh started to gain the much required professionalism and also started to attach commercial value to it. This prompted them to organise art exhibitions to showcase their work to the audiences. By the 1960s the artists started to link with the art traditions of other parts of the world, which gained them a pretty clear understanding of contemporary art in those countries. Many artists went to Europe and Japan for training and came back with new ideas and latest techniques, but they were also steeped in the traditions of indigenous art forms.

After the independence of Bangladesh, Bangladesh Shilpakala Academy was set up in 1974, which later started to organise regular art exhibitions and festivals involving both national and international artists. By this time, Bangladeshi art also began to get international recognitions and appreciations.

== Contemporary art ==
Several art movements arose in Bangladesh as well, artists exhibited internationally and few groups of artists formed in the Bangladeshi contemporary art scene. Few institutions were established to be involved with contemporary creation. Several artists left the country and practiced on interdisciplinary media in Europe, America and Japan. Bangladeshi born Tayeba Begum Lipi, Runa Islam, Hasan Elahi, Naeem Mohaiemen, Firoz Mahmud, Professor Mohd. Jashim Uddin (Printmaker, Professor, Institute of Fine Arts, University of Chittagong.)Rana Begum and Mohammad Rakibul Hasan practiced on various media including video, installation, photography, text, sound, painting and other new media of art and got recognition exhibiting internationally. Britto Arts Trust is the first non-profit artist run art organisation who organised several art events on contemporary media. The 1990s saw greater connections between artists and their audience through increasing art venues and art sales. Samdani Art Foundation was established in early 2010s and massively changing the scenario of contemporary art and culture via events such as the Dhaka Art Summit where "international, non-commercial research and exhibition platform for art and architecture" of South Asia is organized.

== Bibliography ==
- Glassie, Henry (1997). Art and Life in Bangladesh. Indianapolis: University Press Unit. pp. 511. ISBN 9780253332912.
