= Sarker Protick =

Bangladeshi photographer and visual artist

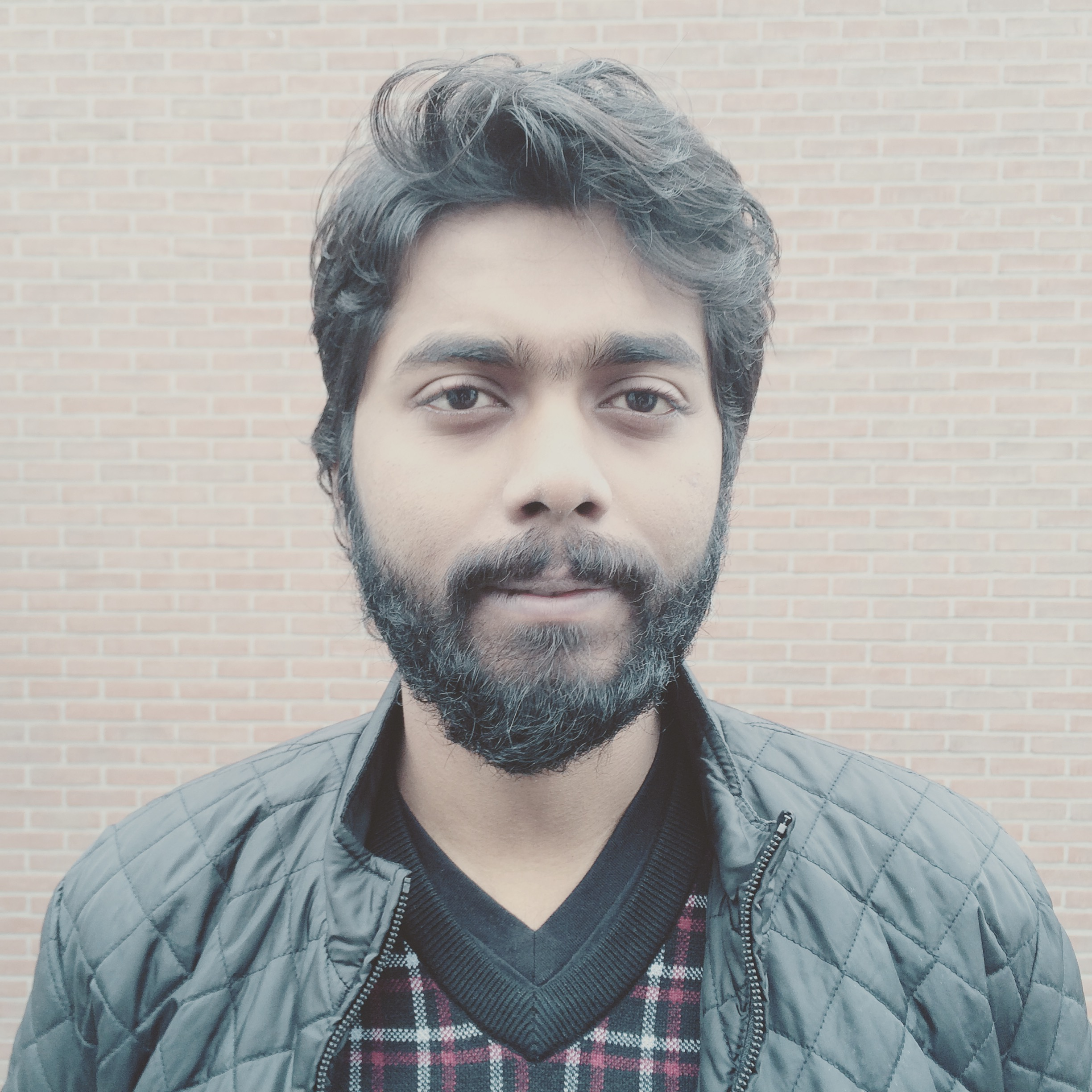
- Protick in 2014
- Born: 1986 (age 39–40); Dhaka, Bangladesh
- Occupations: Photojournalist, teacher
- Years active: 2011–present
- Known for: Photography
- Website: www.sarkerprotick.com

Sarker Protick (Bengali: সরকার প্রতিক) is a Bangladeshi photographer and visual artist.

== Life and work ==
Protick is a lecturer at Pathshala-South Asian Media Institute and co-curator at Chobi Mela International Photography Festival. He is a former member of the VII Photo Agency and is represented by East Wing Gallery.

He was chosen by the British Journal of Photography as 'One to watch' in 2014.

== Publications ==
=== Joint publication ===
- Astres Noirs. Chose Commune, 2016. With Katrin Koenning. ISBN 978-2-9548777-2-3. Edition of 1500 copies.
  - Second, augmented edition with different cover. Chose Commune, 2017. ISBN 979-10-96383-03-0. Edition of 1500 copies.

=== Contributions to publications ===
- Under the Banyan Tree. South Asian Media Academy, 2011. Catalogue of images by 15 photographers from Pathshala in Bangladesh. ISBN 9789843334442. Includes In Midnight Black by Protick.

== Reception ==
The book Astres Noirs was the result of Protick distributing his work using social media. On Instagram, Protick in Bangladesh and Koenning in Australia shared hundreds of photographs. Co-directors of publishers Chose Commune, Cécile Poimboeuf-Koizumi and Vasantha Yogananthan, following the two artists on social networks, noticed artistic affinities in dialogue that banished distance. In their studio in Paris, far removed from Bangladesh and Australia, they developed a book concept that replicated the illumination of the mobile phone screen and its constant flow of imagery;

On black paper the pages [are] printed in silver ink with traces of a harsh and blinding light originally generated by the smartphone. Thus, the light of the images is not white, but a metallic gray, paradoxically evoking the essential material of film photography: silver salt. From an all-digital universe, the photographs of Protick and Koenning retain the luminance of the screen thanks to the unusual printing process that transforms them into a malleable material from which the photographic narrative is constructed. Bound in a sort of Japanese fold (each of the pages is double, folded on itself from the top), the book is punctuated with "hidden" images, printed on the inside of the fold.

As José Alberto Caro Díaz expresses it;

German photographer Katrin Koenning and Bangladesh-based photographer Sarker Protick collaborate despite distance. This work represents photographs taken with a mobile phone camera, capturing the ordinary like a drop of water or a ray of light, and transforming it, discovering an unexplored world [and] show a passion for the world that surrounds them.

The New Yorker reviewed Protick's What Remains, noting that it was made over a year of return visits "to learn how his grandparents felt as they confronted old age," and for which he developed a overexposed high key technique. The British Journal of Photography identifies the photographer's "emptiness of his compositions and their minimalist colour palette alluding to loss," in discussing the series in their 2014 issue "Ones to Watch";

What Remains is a touching portrait of a Bangladeshi couple, shot in the last weeks of the woman's life by her grandson, Sarker Protick, who brings a subtle hand and economy of style to a difficult and very personal subject; the emptiness of his compositions and their minimalist colour palette alluding to loss in place of a strict narrative.

Manik Katyal, founder of Emaho Magazine, describes Protick's adaptability and intuitive approach when intending to photograph Bangladesh's largest waterway, the Padma, but on discovering how erosion of the river's shore disadvantaged the communities that live beside and depend on the river for their livelihoods, he made that his subject;

Of River and Lost Lands deals with an important subject to present to a wider audience, as it lacks visibility in Bangladesh. He uses photography in a decidedly unsettling manner [in dealing with loss]

== Exhibitions ==
- Dhaka Art Summit 2023
- Chobi Mela VII International Photography Festival, 2013
- Festival of Promenades Photographiques Vendome 2012 & 2013, France
- Noorderlicht Photo festival 2012, Netherlands
- Tokyo Month of Photography 2013
- Of River and Lost Lands, Photography Oxford festival, 2014

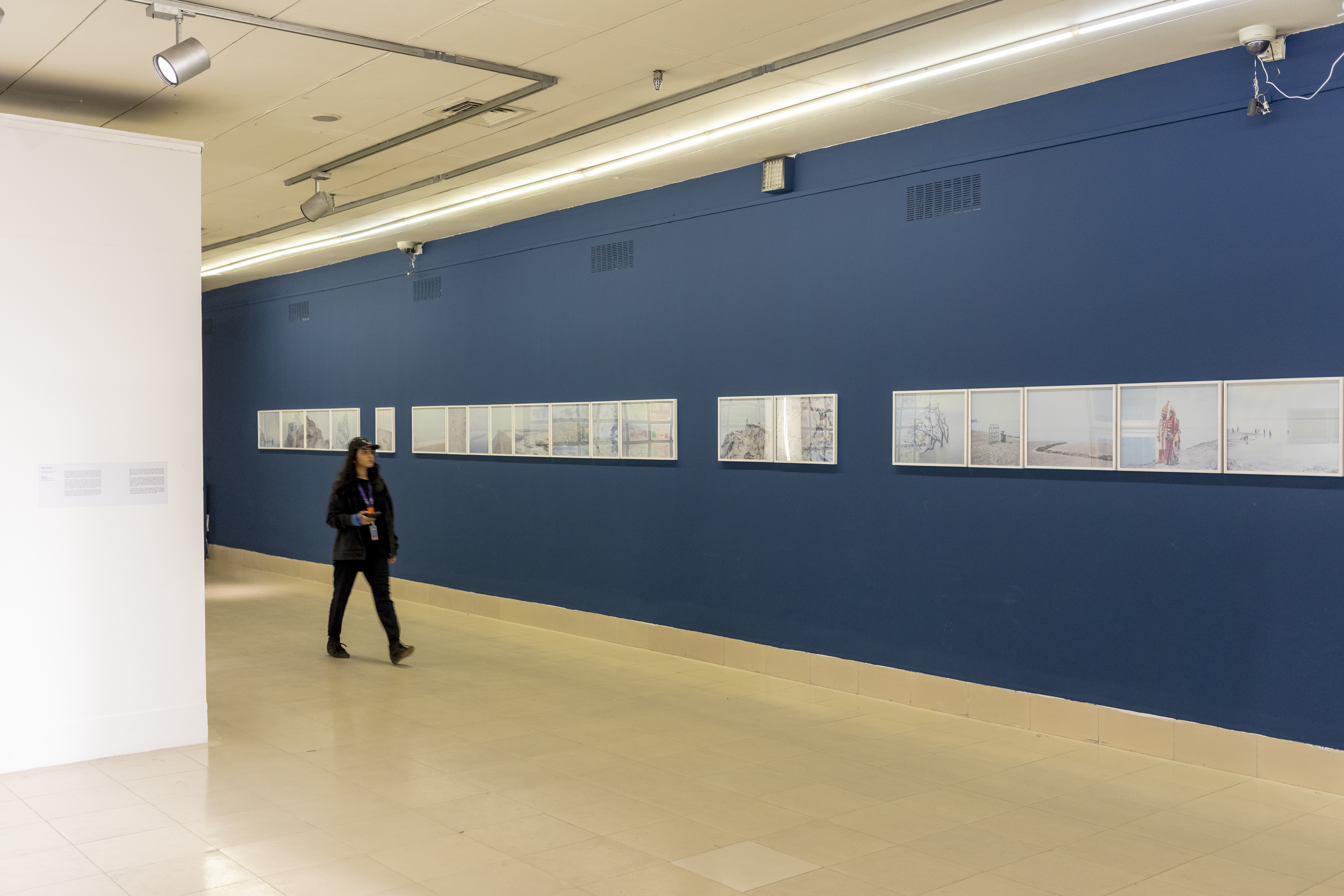
To Enter the Sky - Protick Sarker, Dhaka Art Summit 2023, Shilpokola Academy, Dhaka, Bangladesh

== Awards ==
- 2012: Prix Mark Grosset pour les écoles internationales de photographie, France
- 2012: Winner of World Bank Art Program, US
- 2014: 'Ones to Watch' – (featured), British Journal of Photography, UK
- 2014: Selected to participate in World Press Photo Joop Swart Master class, Netherlands
- 2015: Photo District News's 30 Emerging Photographers
- 2015: World Press Photo Award (for the story "What Remains")
- 2019: Light Work Artist Residency, Syracuse NY.

== See also ==
- List of Bangladeshi photographers
