= Biraj =

Biraj is an Indian and Nepalese Hindu male given name. Notable people with this name include:

- Biraj Bhatta, a Nepalese actor
- Biraj Maharjan, a Nepalese footballer
- Andrew Biraj, a Bangladeshi photojournalist
- Biraj Timilsina,from Pokhara(Studied in Sagarmatha Secondary school)

== See also ==
- Biraj Bahu, Bollywood film
