= Bijon =

Bijon may refer to:

== People ==
- Bijon Bhattacharya (1915–1978), Indian actor
- Bijon Dasgupta (born 1951), art director of Indian film industry
- Bijon Dey (born 1994), Indian cricketer
- Bijon Sarkar (1935–2012), Bangladeshi photographer

== Other uses ==
- Bíjon, the entree rice vermicelli, in the Filipino language
- Bijon Setu, a bridge in Kolkata

== See also ==
- Bichon, a family of dogs
