= Hasan Saifuddin Chandan =

Bangladeshi photographer

- হাসান সাইফুদ্দিন চন্দন
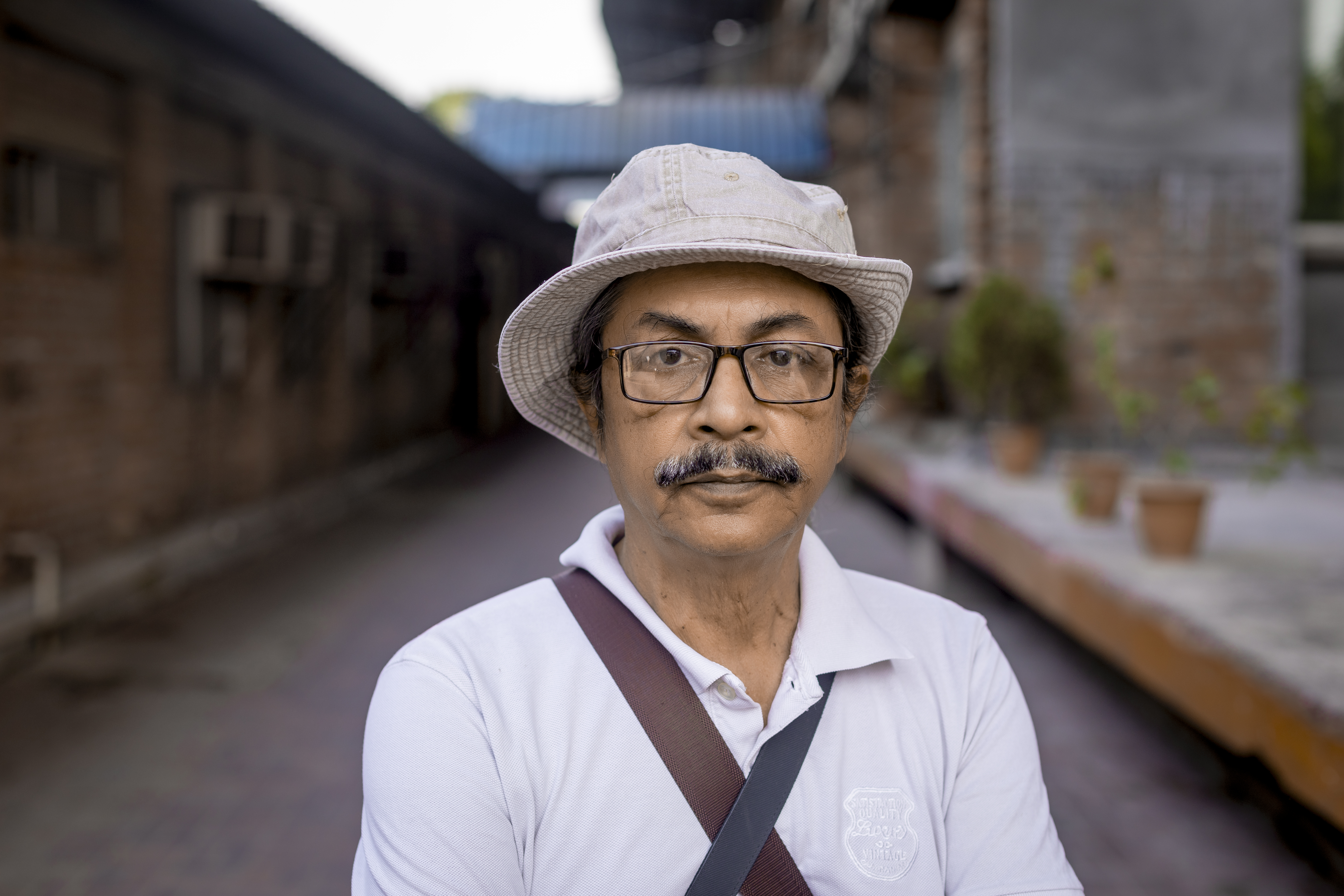
- Born: Chandan Bangladesh
- Occupation: Photographer
- Years active: 1960–present
- Agent: MAP
- Known for: Street photography
- Notable credit: People of kamlapur
- Website: www.map.com

Hasan Saifuddin Chandan is a Bangladeshi street photographer. He has been working with different concerns in Bangladesh since 1985. He is a member of the MAP Photo Agency. He has received more than 100 awards. He is also teaching photography in BUET Architect Department. He is the first FIAP Gold Medalist of Bangladesh.

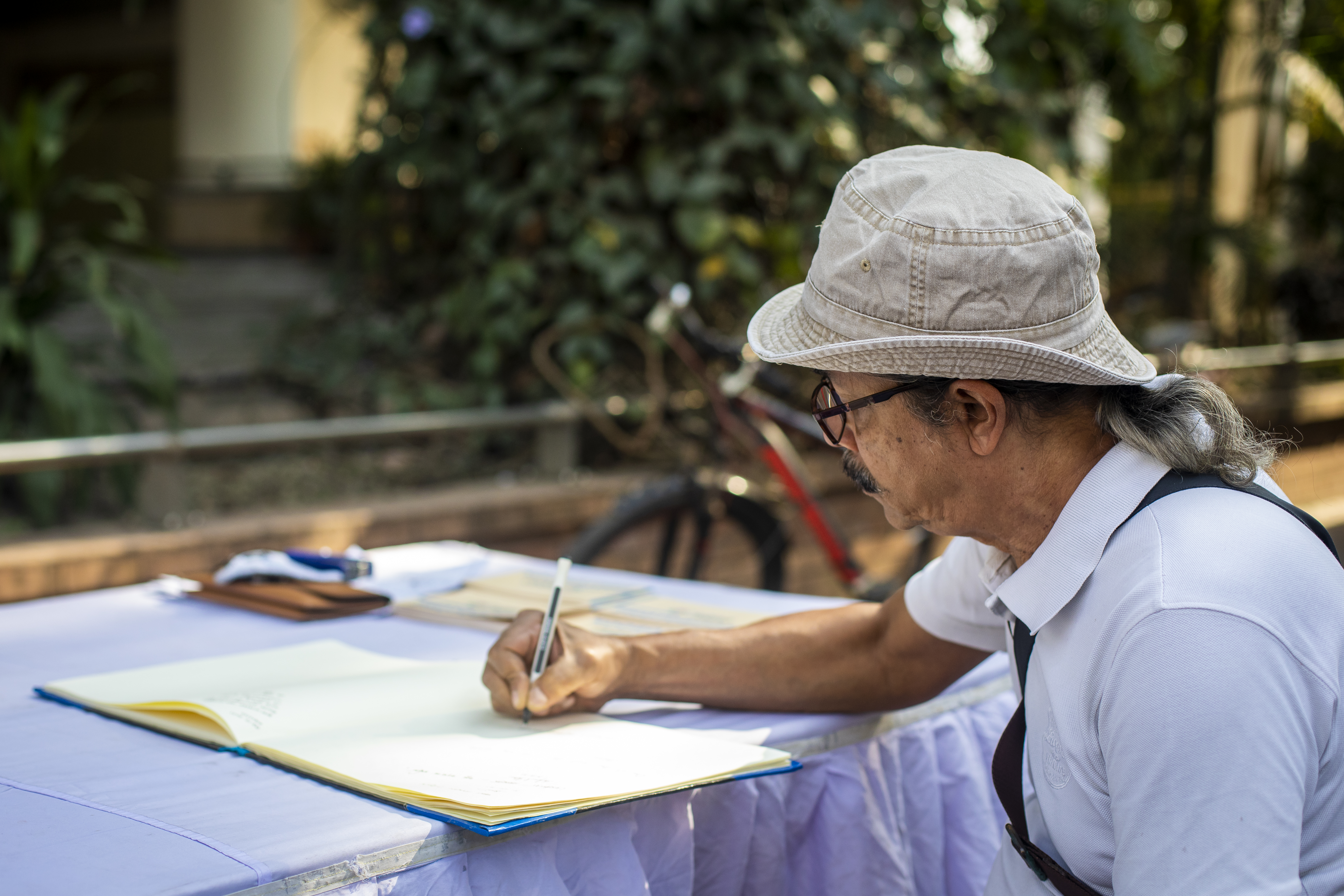
Hasan Saifuddin Chandan is writing his comment at Wellness of Bangladesh Photography exhibition at Bangladesh University of Health Sciences.

== Education ==
Chandan passed his matriculation from Government Laboratory High School & Collage, Dhaka, Bangladesh; intermediate from Notre Dame College, Dhaka.

== Jobs ==
- 1987–1988: staff photographer, Bangladesh National Museum
- 1990–1991: staff photographer, Weekly Dialogue and Sanglap

== Awards ==
- Fédération Internationale de l'Art Photographique (FIAP) Gold Medal in Europa 85, Spain
- Grand Prize in "Street And People", Asian Cultural Center For UNESCO, Japan, 1986
- Honorable Mention in NIKON Photo Contest International, Japan, 1986
- FIAP Honorable Mention in photojournalism competition, Australia, 1987
- FIAP Honorable Mention in International Competition, Chittagong, 1989
- 3rd Prize in NINON Photo Contest International, Japan, 1991
- FIAP Silver Medal in the International Photo Competition Celebrating 150th Anniversary of Photography in France, 1996

== Exhibitions ==
- 1985: Group exhibition organized by the International Youth Year Festival Committee at Alliance Française de Dhaka
- 1985–1997: More than 60 photographs were exhibited in various international exhibitions worldwide, including ten photographs in an Author's Exhibition on the eve of the 150th Anniversary Authors' Exhibition of Photography in Pablo Picasso and Victor Hugo Museum in France

== Publications ==
=== Publications by Chandan ===
- The People at Kamalapur Railway Station. MAP, 1994. ISBN 978-9844650619. Contains 63 photographs, published during an exhibition in Switzerland.
  - The People at Kamalapur Railway Station. Second edition, 2008. Contains 71 photographs.

=== Publications with contributions by Chandan ===
- Britto: Images of Map. Dhaka: Matri, 2003. OCLC 56095617. Catalogue of an "exhibition by Map Photo Agency in associassion [sic] with Chhinnamukul Bangladesh, held at La Galerie, Dhaka, Bangladesh from December 10–20, 2003."

== See also ==
- GMB Akash
- Munir Uz Zaman
- Mohammad Rakibul Hasan
- Rashid Talukder
