= Santi Palacios =

Spanish photojournalist (born 1985)

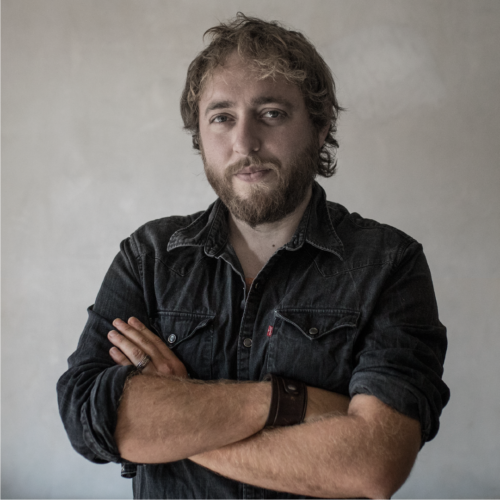
Santi Palacios

Santi Palacios (born 1985, Madrid, Spain) is a Spanish photojournalist.

He works mainly outside of his country contributing to international news agencies and media outlets such as The Associated Press and El Pais among others, and has won multiple international and national awards for his work such as the "Premio Nacional de Fotoperiodismo de España" (Spanish National Prize in Photojournalism) in 2015.

Also a trained sociologist, during the past years he has focused much of his work on immigrants and where they come from as well as their journeys and final destinations. In 2018 he was selected as one of six talents in Europe by the World Press Photo Foundation's 6x6 program.

== Awards ==
- 2016: National Headliners Awards, Best of Show in Photography - Winner.
- 2016: Istanbul Photo Awards, Story News - 1st place.
- 2016: China International Press Photo Contest (CHIPP), General News Single - Award of Excellence.
- 2016: Sigma Delta Chi Awards, Feature Photography - Winner.
- 2016: Pictures of the Year International, News Picture Story - Award of Excellence.
- 2016: Overseas Press Club of America, The John Faber Award - Honorable Mention.
- 2016: Associated Press Media Editors for Journalism Excellence, News Story Photo - Winner.
- 2015: Photojournalism National Award, Spain - Winner.
- 2015: Atlanta Photojournalism Seminar, News Picture Story - 1st Place.
- 2015: China International Press Photo Contest, General News Single - Award of Excellence.
- 2015: Pictures of the Year International, General News Single - Award of Excellence.
- 2014: Revela International Photography Award for the Social Rights Holders - Winner.
