= Rokeya Mannan =

Bangladeshi social activist (1935–2012)

- রোকেয়া মান্নান
- Born: 6 January 1935
- Died: 29 March 2012 (aged 77); Dhaka, Bangladesh
- Education: Lady Brabourne College
- Spouses: Sadrul Islam Mohammand Golam Mannan
- Relatives: Quazi Anwara Monsur (sister)

Rokeya Mannan (6 January 1935 – 29 March 2012) was a Bangladeshi social activist and educator. She served as the headmistress of Agrani School and College. She was awarded Begum Rokeya Padak in 2005 by the government of Bangladesh and Anannya Top Ten Awards in 2012 for her contribution to education and social work.

== Career ==
Mannan studied at Lady Brabourne College.

Mannan wrote an autobiography, A Long Way: The Story of My Life.

== Background ==
Mannan had an elder sister, Quazi Anwara Monsur, also a Begum Rokeya Padak winning educator and founder of Agrani School and College.

Rokeya Mannan was married to Sadrul Islam Mohammand Golam Mannan (1918–2010), who served as the president of the Pakistan Medical Association and the Commonwealth Medical Association and a professor of anatomy at Dhaka Medical College and Hospital. Together they had a son, Shubho, and a daughter, Shagota.
