= Bijon Sarkar =

Bangladeshi photographer

- বিজন সরকার
- Born: 11 April 1935; Gaibandha, Bangladesh
- Died: 29 November 2012 (aged 77); City Hospital, Lalmatia, Dhaka
- Known for: Documentary photographer, art photographer
- Notable work: Photographs without camera
- Style: Photogram
- Movement: Bangladesh Photographic Society (BPS)

Bijon Sarkar (Bengali: বিজন সরকার) (11 April 1935 – 29 November 2012) was a Bangladeshi photographer.

== Life and work ==
He was born on 11 April 1935, in Gaibandha, Bangladesh, the son of Gouranath Sarkar. Bijon Sarkar left home for Dhaka after his parents died and his ancestral land was lost in river erosion. Bijon had his first lessons in photography from his elder brother Tarapodo Sarkar, who was a self-taught sculptor but pursued photography at leisure. His first professional training in photography was while he participated in the workshop conducted by photographer Manzoor Alam Beg in 1961. Sarkar's career in photography took off after his appointment at the Pakistan's Geological Survey in 1962. Seven years later, he joined Pakistan Television as a cameraman. The television authority sacked him after the War of Independence began in 1971, forcing Sarkar to take refuge in India. He later joined Bangladesh Parjatan Corporation as its Chief Photographer in 1972 and retired from there in 1995. A founding member of the Bangladesh Photographic Society (BPS), he became its president in the 1990s. He was also one of the founding members of the Bangladesh Film Society. Bijon believed photography had every potential to become a form of art like painting. And his first photography exhibition exhibited his belief very well. Bijon Sarker died on 29 December 2012. He sustained head injuries in a road accident on the night of 21 November 2012. He was in a coma and never regained consciousness.

== Photography career ==
Sarker took his first photography lessons from his elder brother Tarapodo Sarker, who was a self-taught sculptor. Sarker then participated in the workshop conducted by the photographer Golam Kashem Daddy. In 1962 Sarkar was appointed to the Pakistan's Geological Survey as a photographer. After liberation Bijon Sarkar joined Bangladesh Parjatan Corporation as a Chief Photographer in 1972. In 1995 he retired from Parjatan Corporation and became the founding member of the Bangladesh Photographic Society (BPS). He became its president in 1990s.

== Photogram ==
He experimented in the darkroom and created some remarkable artworks, known as photograms, doing photography without a camera. He believed photography had every potential to become a form of art like painting. He put up an exhibition of photographs at Rawalpindi in 1970, his last solo photo exhibition. The nature and life of rural Bengal was always his favorite subject.

== Cinematography career ==
In 1969 Sarkar joined Pakistan Television as a cinematographer; he also worked as Assistant Cinematographer in the film Nodi o Nari. He was one of the founding members of the Bangladesh Film Society.

== Awards ==
- 1st Prize in the Second ACCU contest in 1977
- Commonwealth Award in 1978
- Honourable mentions in the first and second CPE in Canada and Cyprus in 1978 and 1980 respectively
- ACCU in 1996
- 'Grameen Bangladesh', a poster that won the Bangladesh Parjatan Corporation 'PAT Gold Award', was a photograph taken by Bijon Sarkar

== Exhibitions ==
- Solo exhibition at Dhaka in 1967
- Solo exhibition at Islamabad in 1970

== Lifetime achievement ==
Bijon Sarkar remains one of the unsung heroes of the Bangladesh photographic movement. With a penchant for experimentation, Sarkar's photograms of the sixties were remarkable not only for the nature of the work, but because it happened in Pakistan, in complete isolation. Experimentation remained his passion even into the digital age, where he took abstract motifs from found objects to digitally synthesise human and other conventional forms. Bijon Sarkar received the Chobi Mela International Photography Festival VII lifetime achievement award in 2013.

== Death ==
On 29 December 2012, Bijon Sarkar died. He sustained head injuries in a road accident on the night of 21 November 2012. He had been undergoing treatment at the intensive care unit (ICU) of City Hospital in Dhaka. He had received injuries in his head, and bled profusely. He was in a coma and never regained consciousness.

== Interviews ==
ফটোগ্রাফি উইদাউট ক্যামেরা! কামরা খন্ড-১

== See also ==
- List of Bangladeshi photographers
