= Munem Wasif =

Bangladeshi photographer

- Born: 11 April 1983; Dhaka, Bangladesh
- Occupations: Photographer, teacher, writer
- Known for: Documentary photography
- Website: munemwasif.com

Munem Wasif (Bengali: মুনেম ওয়াসিফ) (born 11 April 1983) is a photographer from Bangladesh.

== Biography ==
Munem Wasif is a documentary photographer in Bangladesh. He has been represented by Agence Vu since 2008, and is now teaching documentary photography at Pathshala South Asian Media Academy.

He was selected for the World Press Photo Joop Swart Masterclass in 2007. In 2008, he won the City of Perpignan Young Reporter's Award at Visa pour l'image. That year, he also won the International Award for concerned photography, the F25 for under-25's in the Fabrica awards. The following year, he was awarded the Prix Pictet commission for his work on the water crisis of the north-west region of Bangladesh.

His work has been exhibited worldwide, including at the Musée de l'Élysée, and the Fotomuseum Winterthur in Switzerland, the International Photography Biennial of the Islamic World in Iran, Tokyo Metropolitan Museum of Photography in Japan, the Kunsthal Museum and the Noorderlicht festival in the Netherlands, Angkor photo festival in Cambodia, London's Whitechapel Gallery, Palais de Tokyo, Visa pour l'image in France, and at Chobi Mela, Bangladesh.

Wasif's photographs have been published in Le Monde 2, the Sunday Times Magazine, The Guardian, Politiken, Io Donna, Mare, Du, Days Japan, L'espresso, Libération, Courier International, Photo, British Journal of Photography, LensCulture, Photo District News and Zonezero. Wasif began his career as a feature photographer for The Daily Star newspaper, Bangladesh, after graduating from Pathshala.

During his residency he told the Centre for Contemporary Art Singapore about his film "Goom" which literary translates in English to "Forced Disappearance" It says "Prompted by recent shifts in the political climate of his own country, Munem Wasif is currently working on a film project titled Goom (forced disappearance, kidnapping in Bangla.)". The work revolves around the increasing phenomenon of people gone missing, disappearances that often remain unexplained and unaccounted for.

== Family ==
Munem Wasif is the son of Bangladeshi politician and lawyer Abdul Matin Khasru.

== Publications ==
=== Books by Wasif ===
- Bangladesh Standing on the Edge. Paris: CDP, 2008. ISBN 978-2351300220. With texts by Agnès de Gouvion Saint-Cyr and Christian Caujolle in French and English.
- Salt Water Tears: Lives Left behind in Satkhira, Bangladesh. London: Prix Pictet, 2009. ISBN 9780955866135.
- Larmes salées = Salty Tears. Marseille: Images Plurielles, 2011. ISBN 978-2-919436-01-9. With texts by Pavel Partha and Francis Hodgson in French and English.
- Belonging. Paris: Clémentine de la Féronnière, 2013. ISBN 9782954226613. With text by Christian Caujolle in French and English.

=== Books with contributions by Wasif ===
- Under the Banyan Tree. Dhaka: Pathshala, 2010. ISBN 978-984-33-3444-2.
- Street Photography Now. London: Thames & Hudson, 2010. ISBN 9780500289075.

== Grants and awards ==
- Sagamihara photo Asian Prize by Sagamihara photo festival, Japan. 2010
- Prix Pictet commission on water, France, 2009
- City of Perpignan Young Reporter's Award, Visa pour l'Image, France, 2008
- F25, International Award for concerned photography, Italy, 2008
- 30 emerging photographers by Photo District News, USA, 2008
- Young reporter award by Festival du Scoop of Angers, France, 2008
- Joop Swart Masterclass by World Press Photo, Netherland, 2007
