= Kazi Abul Monsur =

Bangladeshi physician and microbiologist (1918–1996)

- Born: 8 March 1918; Rajapur, Faridpur district, Bengal Presidency
- Died: February 20, 1996 (aged 77); Bangladesh
- Education: Calcutta Medical College
- Occupations: Professor, Microbiologist
- Spouse: Quazi Anwara Monsur
- Children: Shahidul Alam
- Relatives: Kazi Salahuddin (nephew); Nawab Abdul Latif; Nassakh
- Awards: Independence Day Award, 1996

Kazi Abul Monsur (1918 – 20 February 1996) was a physician and microbiologist of Bangladesh. He was awarded Independence Day Award posthumously in 1996 by the Government of Bangladesh for his contribution in the field of medical science.

== Early life and education ==
He was born on 4 March 1918 to the aristocratic Kazi family of Rajapur in Boalmari, Faridpur district, Bengal Presidency. His father, Kazi Abdur Rashid, was a moulvi and his mother, Begum Syedunnesa, was a housewife. The family was founded by Kazi Abdur Rasool, son of Shah Azimuddin, who was purported have descended from the Arab Muslim general Khalid ibn al-Walid despite the fact the consensus of Arab genealogists that Khalid ibn al-Walid's lineage in the paternal line had died out during the Plague of Amwas. Nonetheless, this Kazi Abdur Rasool is said to have been appointed as Kazi in Mughal Bengal.

Abul Mansur graduated with a gold medal from Calcutta Medical College in 1943.

== Career ==
He was the professor of Pathology and Bacteriology at Dhaka Medical College and Hospital. He received international acclaim for developing Monsur's Media for the isolation of cholera and the President's "Pride of Performance" medal (Science) in 1966. He set up the first intravenous fluid plant in Bangladesh while Director of the Institute of Public Health, 1961–1972. He stepped down from the board of trustees of ICDDR’B in protest against the sidelining of Bangladesh's national interests.

== Awards ==
- Independence Day Award, 1996
