= Agrani School and College =

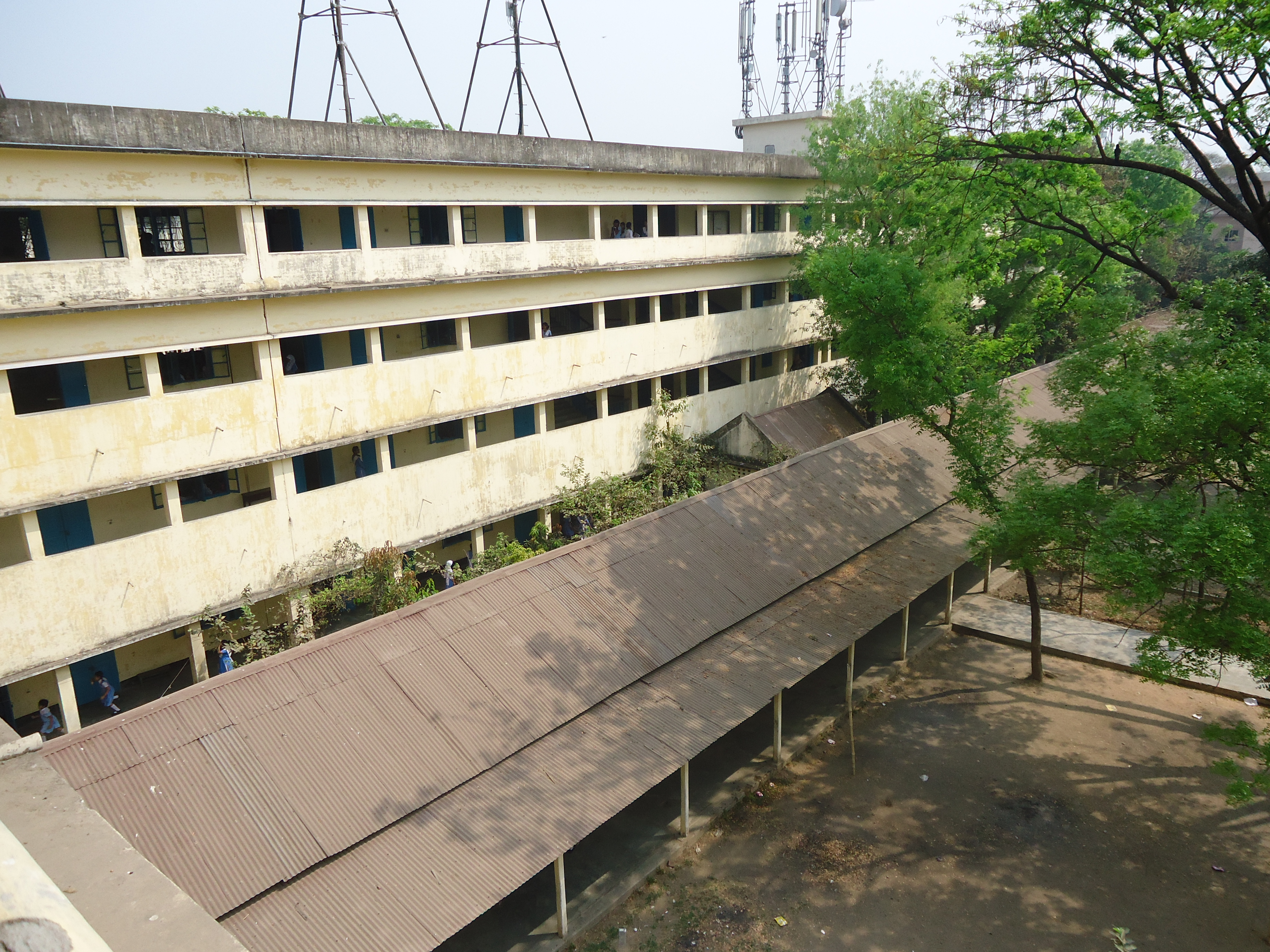

Location
- Azimpur, Dhaka; Bangladesh; 23.7290°N 90.3835°E

Information
- Established: 1957
- Founder: Quazi Anwara Monsur
- Headmaster: Md Rezauzzaman Bhuiyan
- Language: Bengali

Agrani School and College was established at Azimpur, Dhaka, Bangladesh, in 1957 as a kindergarten. From the inception, the medium of instruction was English, although vernacular was also taught in all classes. It was upgraded into a secondary school for girls in 1967. It introduced higher secondary courses in 1994, when it got a new status of school cum college. It offers courses in humanities, commerce and science. There are approximately 4,500 students.

== History ==
Quazi Anwara Monsur of Asia, Margaret Bradley of Europe and Bani Shatter worked at an education-related group: Women's Voluntary Association of Dhaka in 1954. While there, they realized that female education was not widespread in this region of south Asia. Monsur took the responsibility to turn their dream into reality and, as a result of her determination and hard work, "Azimpur kindergarten" was established on the area considered as a park for children and girls.

Some other people also came to help her in the cause, notably, Naimunnesa Chaudhuri, Rabeya Khatun, Amena Bahar, Hosne Ara Begam and engineer M. A. Jabbar. Mansoor took the responsibility of the school head mistress. Monsoor, mostly known as 'Boro Appa' to the students, taught the first batch of students under the tent.

Azimpur Kindergarten began in 1957 with 14 students under a tent.

In 1966 it was named Azimpur Agrani Balika Bidyalay and then Agrani Balika Bidyalay. The college section was established on 1 November 1994 and then it was given the name Agrani School and College.

Rokeya Mannan (students called her Tulu Appa) was headmistress of Agrani School for a long time, and she possesses a special place in the heart and mind of the students of Agrani. She is the co-chairperson of "Breaking the Silence". For her contribution to education in Bangladesh she received the Begum Rokeya Padak in 2006. The award carries a gold medal embossed with Begum Rokeya's image, Tk 10,000 and a certificate to honor the contribution of Begum Rokeya to the awakening of women.

Every year, on 21 January, a Milad Mahfil (group prayer session) is held in the school ground to pray for brighter future and celebrate the birthday of Agrani School and College.

== Staff ==
- Chairman: Mohammad Solaiman Salim
- Principal: Md Rezauzzaman Bhuiyan

== Notable alumni ==
- Samina Chowdhury
