= Quazi Anwara Monsur =

Bangladeshi educator

- কাজী আনোয়ারা মনসুর
- Died: 14 June 2007 (aged 83); Dhaka, Bangladesh
- Education: Lady Brabourne College
- Spouses: Kazi Abul Monsur
- Children: 3, including Shahidul Alam
- Relatives: Rokeya Mannan (sister)

Quazi Anwara Monsur (died on 14 June 2007) was a Bangladeshi educationist. She was the founder of Agrani School and College. She was awarded Begum Rokeya Padak in 1999 by the government of Bangladesh for her work contribution on child education.

== Background ==
Quazi Anwara Monsur studied in Lady Brabourne College. She completed her PhD in 1980.

== Career ==
On 21 January 1957, Monsur founded Azimpur Kindergarten School; renamed to Agrani Girls' School in 1966 and then to Agrani School and College in 1994. She held the headmistress position of the school until 1987.

== Personal life ==
Quazi Anwara Monsur was married to Kazi Abul Monsur, an Independence Day Award winning microbiologist. Their son, Shahidul Alam, is a Ekushey Padak winning photojournalist. They had another son, Khaled Monsur and a daughter, Nazma Karim Dipu. Anwara had a younger sister, Rokeya Mannan (1935–2012), a social activist who won Begum Rokeya Padak in 2005.

Monsur died on 14 June 2007 in Dhaka and buried at New Azimpur Graveyard.
