= Bangladeshi Photographers =

Online Flickr group

- Abbreviation: BP
- Formation: September 2005
- Type: Non-profit organization
- Purpose: Photography
- Headquarters: Dhaka, Bangladesh
- Region served: Worldwide
- Members: 2,000 (2010)
- Administrator: Mohammad Rakibul Hasan, Mohammad Moniruzzaman, Kazi Tahsin Agaz, Aftabuzzaman
- Website: www.flickr.com/groups/bangladeshiphotographers

Bangladeshi Photographers (BP) is a community of photographers from Bangladesh living at home and abroad. It was founded in September 2005 as an online group in Flickr.

== Background ==
Although the primary goal was to provide a worldwide online platform for all the Bangladeshi photo artists, the group gradually evolved and adopted a cross-platform approach, providing support both as an online and a real world photography community. BP has actively organized and participated in real world exhibitions, competitions and community meet-ups. As of 2010, approximately 2,000 members have joined the group online. A large number of these members eventually meet during various events related to photography hosted by BP. The motto of BP is "We share, we care, we inspire!". BP regularly organizes photo outings (popularly known as photowalks), workshops, exhibitions and knowledge sharing sessions.

== Annual events ==
BP has two regular annual events. '60 Shots' is an exhibition where young photographers have an opportunity to showcase their work. 'BP Challenge' is an exhibition cum competition where photographers of all ages can participate in three different age categories to win several cash prizes.

=== 60 Shots ===
The name '60 Shots' has been coined based on the fact that sixty photographs are curated for this exhibition from the images submitted by young Bangladeshi Photographers. An age limit of 28–30 is usually set.

In September 2009, the first season of 60 shots was organized in 'Chhobir Haat' premises of Fine Arts Institute in the University of Dhaka. Fifty young photographers participated in the exhibition with their images depicting different aspects of their homeland.

The second season of '60 Shots' took place in February 2011 in DRIK picture gallery, Dhaka. Again, this exhibition featured sixty images from sixty young photographers. This exhibition ran for five days and was inaugurated on February 25 by Bangladeshi artists Shishir Bhattacharjee and Ferdousi Priyobhashini.

=== BP Challenge ===
Bangladeshi Photographers (BP) Challenge challenges photographers to compete with their best images. This juried competition is usually held in three age categories encompassing both newbies and veterans in the field of photography. The best photographs are exhibited and three photographers from different age categories are awarded with cash prizes.

The first season of BP Challenge was announced in February 2010. From over 275 submissions, judges chose 50 photographs and declared three winners in different age categories. The exhibition was inaugurated on August 10, 2011, in the Dhaka Art Center. Photographers Mr. David Barikder and Mr. GMB Akash along with photojournalist Mr. Kawser Mahmud were special guests in the opening ceremony. Thirty more photographs from the veteran photographers were also exhibited along with the competing entries.

BP Challenge – season II opened on May 25, 2012, in Dhaka Art Center. The challenge presented around ninety frames which consisted of competing shots and works from prominent photographers of Bangladesh.

== Regular online events ==
BP continues several online events in its Flickr platform. Among these BP Photo Marathon, BP Photo Olympiad and Feature Photographer of the month are the most significant ones.

== Photowalks and member meet-ups ==
‘Photowalk’ is a popular term for the event where photographers in groups go to different places to capture variegated aspects of life. Although organized frequently, such walks don't have any specific schedule. Sometimes a moderator of BP can call upon the interested photographers in an interesting location, or members can themselves organize such walks under the banner of BP.

== Other exhibitions ==
While holding regular photography related activities, BP also arranges special exhibitions for good causes. For example, in January 2008, an exhibition was organized in Russian Cultural Center to support the victims of Cyclone Sidr in remote parts of the country. The exhibition was inaugurated by poet and novelist Syed Shamsul Haque. The revenue generated from the exhibition print sales was donated to the Sidr victims. In February, the same exhibition was continued in Fine Arts Institute of Dhaka University to aid in the treatment of poet Samudra Gupta.

'Globalization: A Bipolar Story', an exhibition bringing photographers from Bangladesh and United States was a project of BP. This was a collaborative venture with Massachusetts Institute of Technology (MIT) which consisted of two exhibitions of the same set of photographs in both Bangladesh and USA. The project was funded by Council for the Arts, MIT. The exhibition presented a distinct yet broad picture of globalization as a phenomenon influencing the local cultures and lifestyles of two completely different countries. Young Bangladeshi photographers studying in local universities and MIT participated in this exhibition.
