= Naib Uddin Ahmed =

Bangladeshi photographer

Naib Uddin Ahmed (1925 – 14 December 2009) was a Bangladeshi photographer best known for his work during the Bangladesh Liberation War. In 2009, an exhibition of his work was held which also featured a documentary on his life.
