= Munir Uz Zaman =

Bangladeshi photojournalist

- মুনির উজ জামান
- Born: 1978 or 1979 (age 47–48)
- Occupation: Photographer
- Organization: AFP
- Known for: Documentary photography

Munir Uz Zaman is a Bangladeshi photographer.

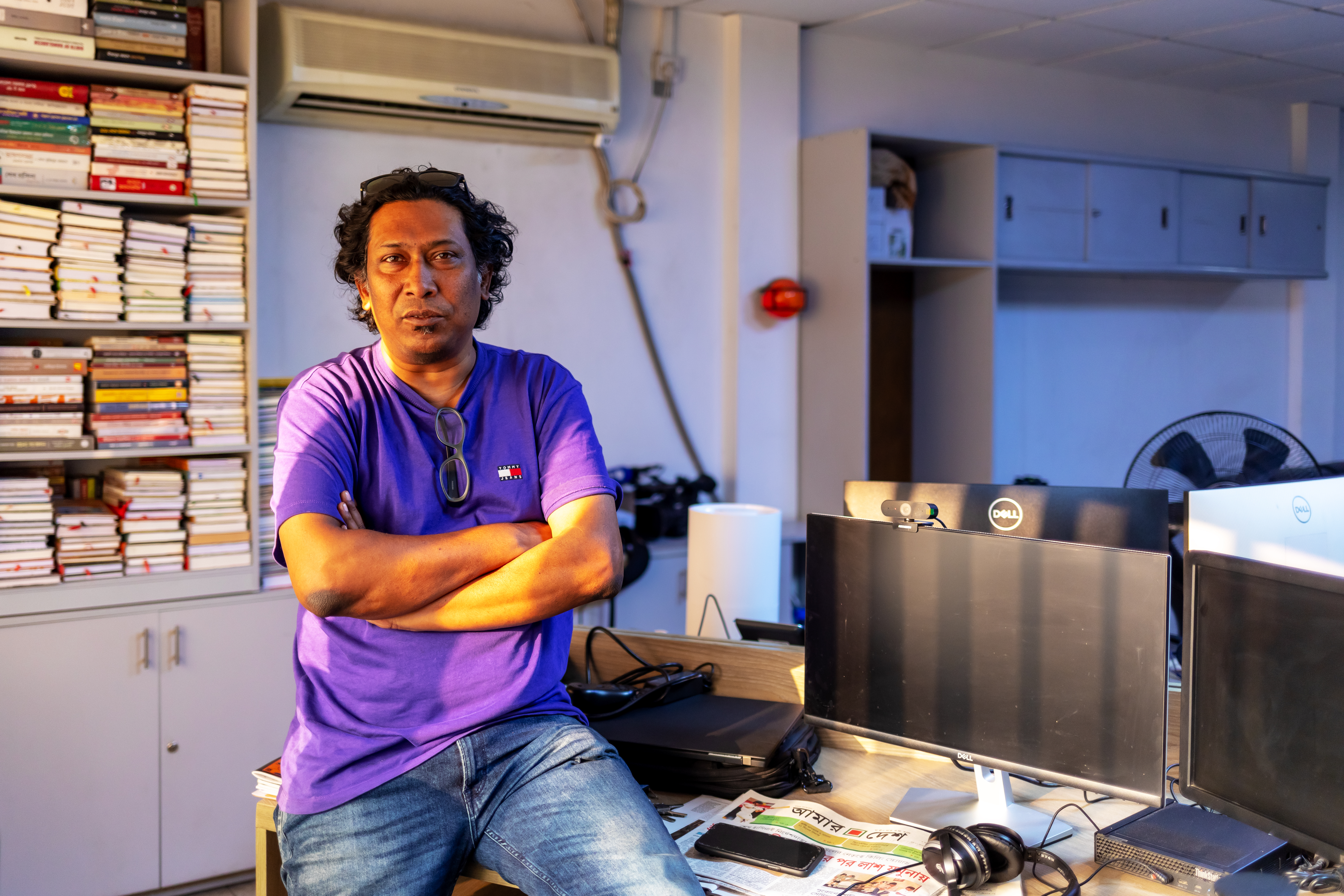

== Biography ==
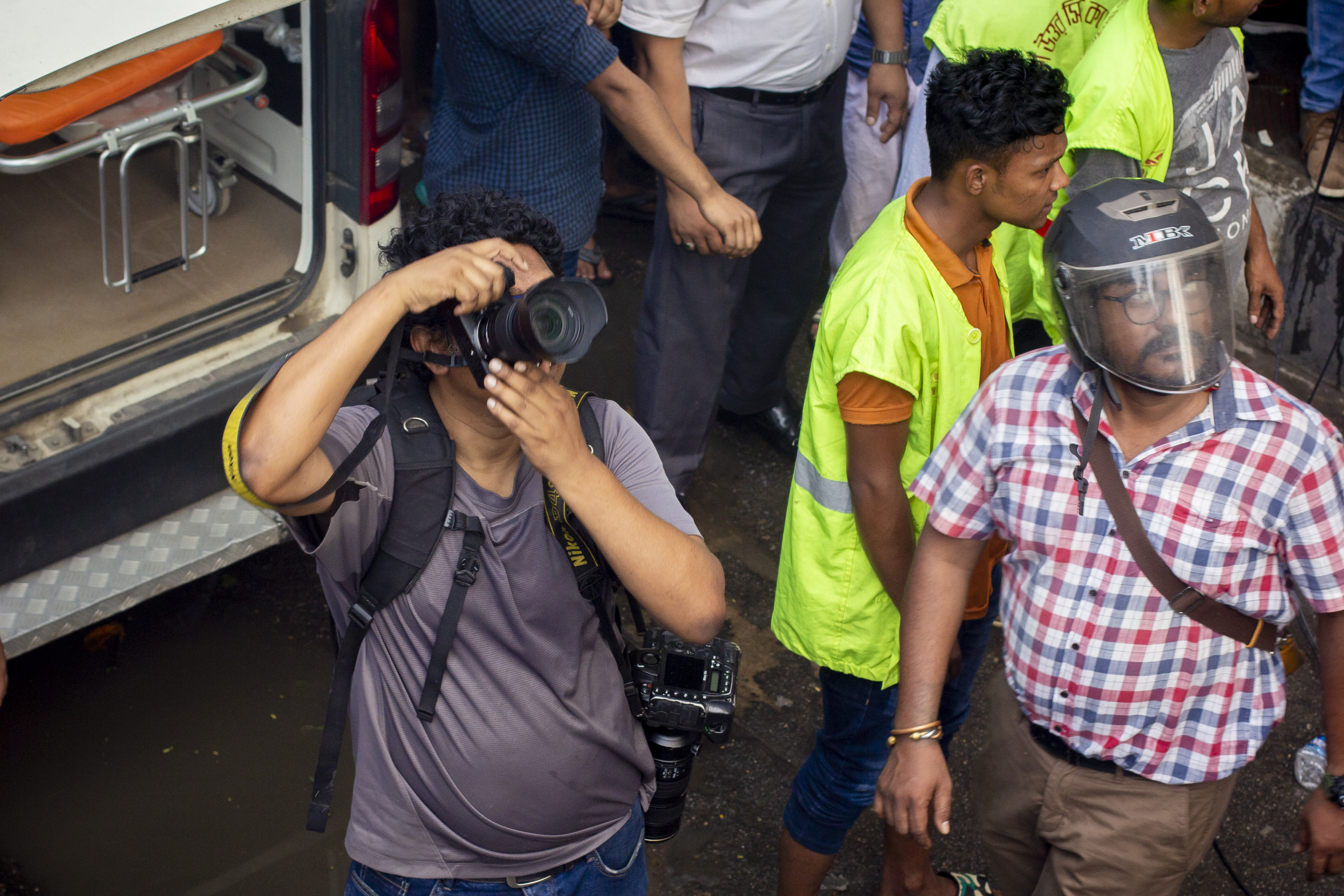
Munir Uz Zaman, AFP photographer, taking a photo at the FR Tower fire.

Munir Uz Zaman works for the Paris-based international news agency Agence France-Presse (AFP). He has received recognition and awards for his works documenting the Rohingya refugee crisis. He has also published photos depicting daily life in Bangladesh. His photo of Tashnuva Anan Shishir, Bangladesh's first transgender news anchor, seated in the Boishakhi Television newsroom, flanked by her colleagues, was selected as one of Time's top 100 photos of 2021.

In 2023, he participated in a group exhibition at Drik Gallery in Dhaka to mark the ten year anniversary of the Rana Plaza collapse.

== Awards ==
- (2009) Pictures of the Year International: honorary mention, spot news
- (2012) FCCT/OnAsia: first place, spot news
- (2013) Human Rights Press Awards: first prize, feature photojournalism, for pictures of Rohingya refugees
- (2013) Atlanta Photojournalism Seminar: second place, spot news
