= Gazi Nafis Ahmed =

Bangladeshi photographer

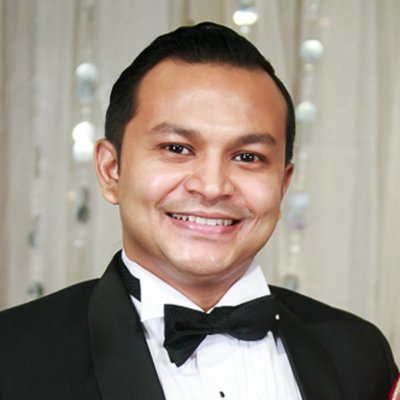
- Born: Nafis Ahmed; 21 November 1982 (age 43); Dhaka, Bangladesh
- Occupation: Artist
- Years active: 2012–present
- Website: gazinafis.com

Gazi Nafis Ahmed is a Bangladeshi scholar and artist working with photography and video.

== Early life and education ==
Ahmed was born in November 1982 in Dhaka, Bangladesh. He attended the Bangladesh International Tutorial school. He studied art and design at the Sir John Cass Department of Art, Media & Design of London Guildhall University in London and photography at the Danish School of Media and Journalism in Denmark. Ahmed was awarded full scholarship by Istituto Europeo di Design in Madrid to do Masters of Fine Arts in photography. In 2016, Ahmed was invited as a scholar at The Center for Social Difference at Columbia University.

== Photography career ==
From 2012 to 2014, he worked at VII Photo Agency, working with John Stanmeyer.

Ahmed was awarded at the Pride Photo Award 2015, held at the historic Oude Kerk, Amsterdam. Pride Photo Award is about gender diversity. Ahmed won in the "Stories of Love and Pride" category for his series "Inner Face". In 2013, Ahmed received the Blub Award from Format International Photography Festival in the United Kingdom. He had a solo show at Bengal Gallery of Fine Arts. Ahmed participated at the Mining Warm Data exhibition. It was curated by Diana Campbell Betancourt, artistic director of DAS. In 2014, his artworks were featured in the show B/Desh at Dhaka Art Summit, curated by Deepak Ananth. Some of the organizations he has worked with are International Finance Corporation of World Bank Group, Medicins Sans Frontieres, UNAIDS, UNDP, WFP, Save The Children. His photographs have been published in The New York Times, The New Yorker, and The Guardian.

In 2013, Ahmed organized a photography forum for photographers of Bangladesh called "Evolution of Photography" at the Edward M Kennedy Center in Dhaka, which gave a platform to share experiences and discuss the history of photography in the country.

One of his series, "Inner Face", addresses the sensitive and precarious issues of human rights of the LGBT community. The work conveys the subtle sense of challenge in the expressions of the community in a traditional and conservative culture like Bangladesh. The photographs carry that sense of "conquering" social taboos, of trying to become free of the manacles that tie the inborn or acquired identity to social norms.

Ahmed was one of five artists that represented Bangladesh at the 58th Venice Biennale in 2019. The venue of the Bangladesh Pavilion was Palazzo Zenobio and its theme was "Thirst". Ahmed displayed "Inner Face", as a reminder for the thirst for love, acceptance and knowledge.

== Family ==
Ahmed comes from the Gazi family, who were one of the Baro Bhuyan (Twelve Zaminders of Bengal) in sixteenth century, from the Bhawal Estate now known as Gazipur in Bangladesh.

His uncle was Gazi Shahabuddin Ahmed.
