= Shahidul Alam =

Bangladeshi photojournalist

- শহিদুল আলম
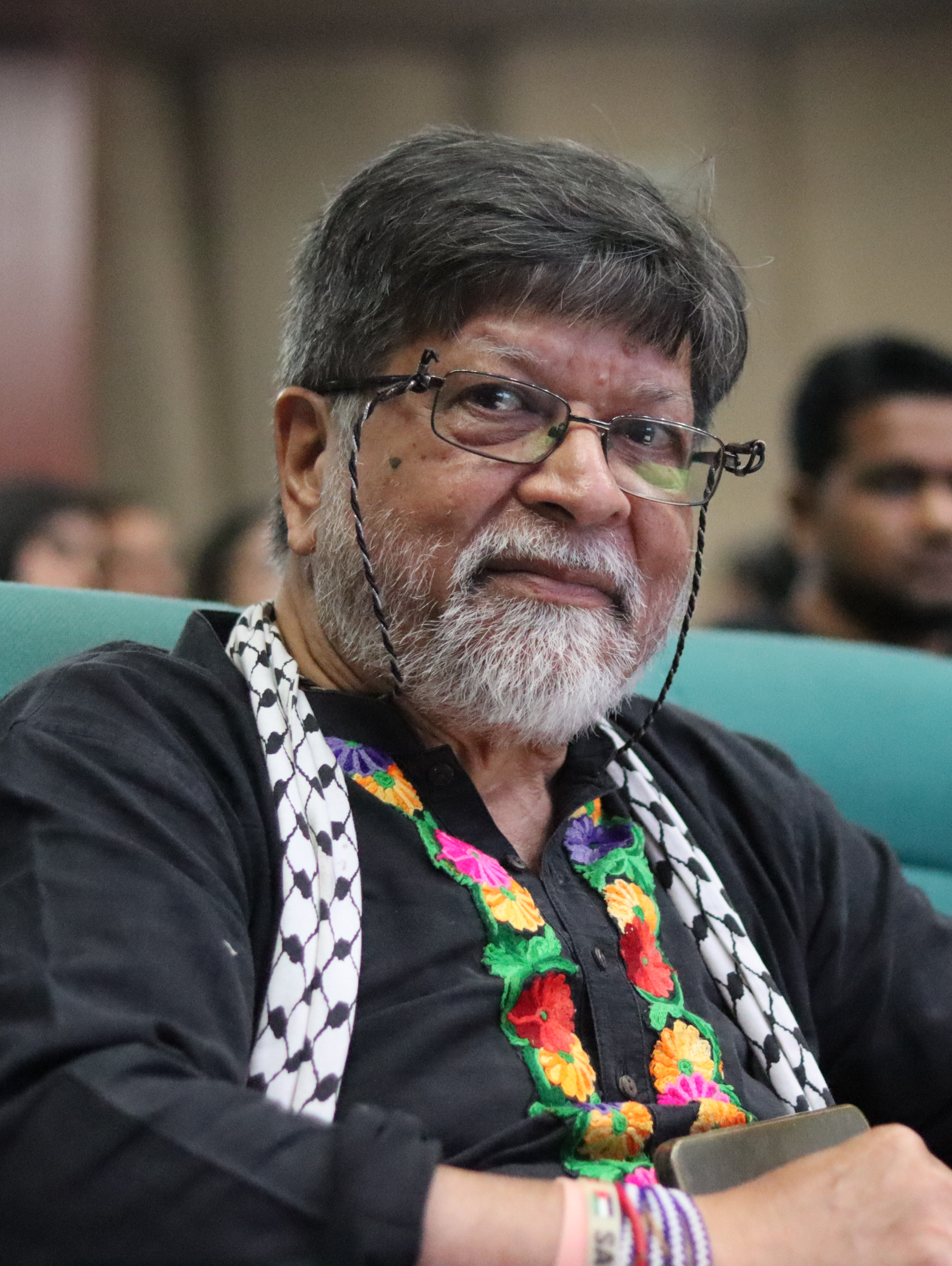
- Shahidul Alam in 2024
- Born: 1955 (age 70–71); Boalmari Upazila, Faridpur, Dacca, Pakistan
- Education: Jhenidah Cadet College, University of Liverpool
- Alma mater: University of Liverpool (BSc); Royal Holloway, University of London (PhD)
- Occupations: Photojournalism, teaching, social rights activism
- Known for: Drik Picture Library; Pathshala South Asian Media Institute; Chobi Mela International Photography Festival
- Spouse: Rahnuma Ahmed
- Parents: Kazi Abul Monsur (father); Quazi Anwara Monsur (mother)
- Awards: Ekushey Padak (2025)
- Shahidul Alam' voice Recorded January 2023

Shahidul Alam (born 1955) is a Bangladeshi media institution builder, photojournalist, public speaker, storyteller, writer, blogger, curator, and educationist.

Alam founded Drik Picture Library in 1989, Pathshala South Asian Media Institute in 1998, the Chobi Mela International Photography Festival in 1999, and Majority World in 2004. In the early 1990s, Drik's work as an internet provider introduced email to Bangladesh. It also developed the country's first Bangla font for the internet, its first webzine, and its first web portal.

Alam's books include Nature's Fury (2007) and My Journey as a Witness (2011). A photographer for over forty years, his work has been featured in publications worldwide and exhibited at the Museum of Modern Art (MOMA), Centre Pompidou, Tate Modern, Tehran Museum of Contemporary Art, the Royal Albert Hall, and the Kuala Lumpur National Art Gallery. He was also the first Asian to chair World Press Photo's International Jury.

Alam has spoken at Oxford, Cambridge, Harvard, and Stanford universities. In 2001, he was awarded an Honorary Fellowship of the Royal Photographic Society. He received the Shilpakala Padak from the president of Bangladesh in 2014, the Humanitarian Award from the Lucie Awards in 2018, and was named one ofTime magazine's Persons of the Year that same year. In 2021, he was the recognised as the CASE Humanitarian of the Year. He was awarded the Ekushey Padak (culture and education) in 2025.

Alam serves as an advisory board member of the National Geographic Society and is a National Geographic Explorer at Large.

== Early life and education ==
Shahidul Alam was born in Dacca, East Pakistan (modern-day Dhaka, Bangladesh), in 1955, and grew up in Dhanmondi. He is one of three children of physician Kazi Abul Monsur and child psychologist Quazi Anwara Monsur, and belongs to the Kazi family of Rajapur in Faridpur District.

As a child, Alam was known for navigating Dhaka's congested streets on his small fold-up bicycle. He attended Jhenaidah Cadet College, a military boarding school in western Bangladesh.

Alam pursued his undergraduate studies at the University of Liverpool, where he earned a BSc in biochemistry and genetics in 1976. During his time in Liverpool, he often wore a lungi—a traditional South Asian garment—while walking through the streets. His political awareness deepened during this period through his involvement with the Socialist Workers Party.

He later moved to London to pursue a PhD in organic chemistry at Bedford College, University of London. It was during his time in London that Alam began to take an active interest in photography. Alongside his doctoral research, he worked as a research chemist, developing alternative photographic printing processes. In 1983, he won the Harvey Harris Trophy from the London Arts Council for one of his photographs—a recognition that boosted his confidence in pursuing a career in photography. He completed his PhD the same year.

== Career ==
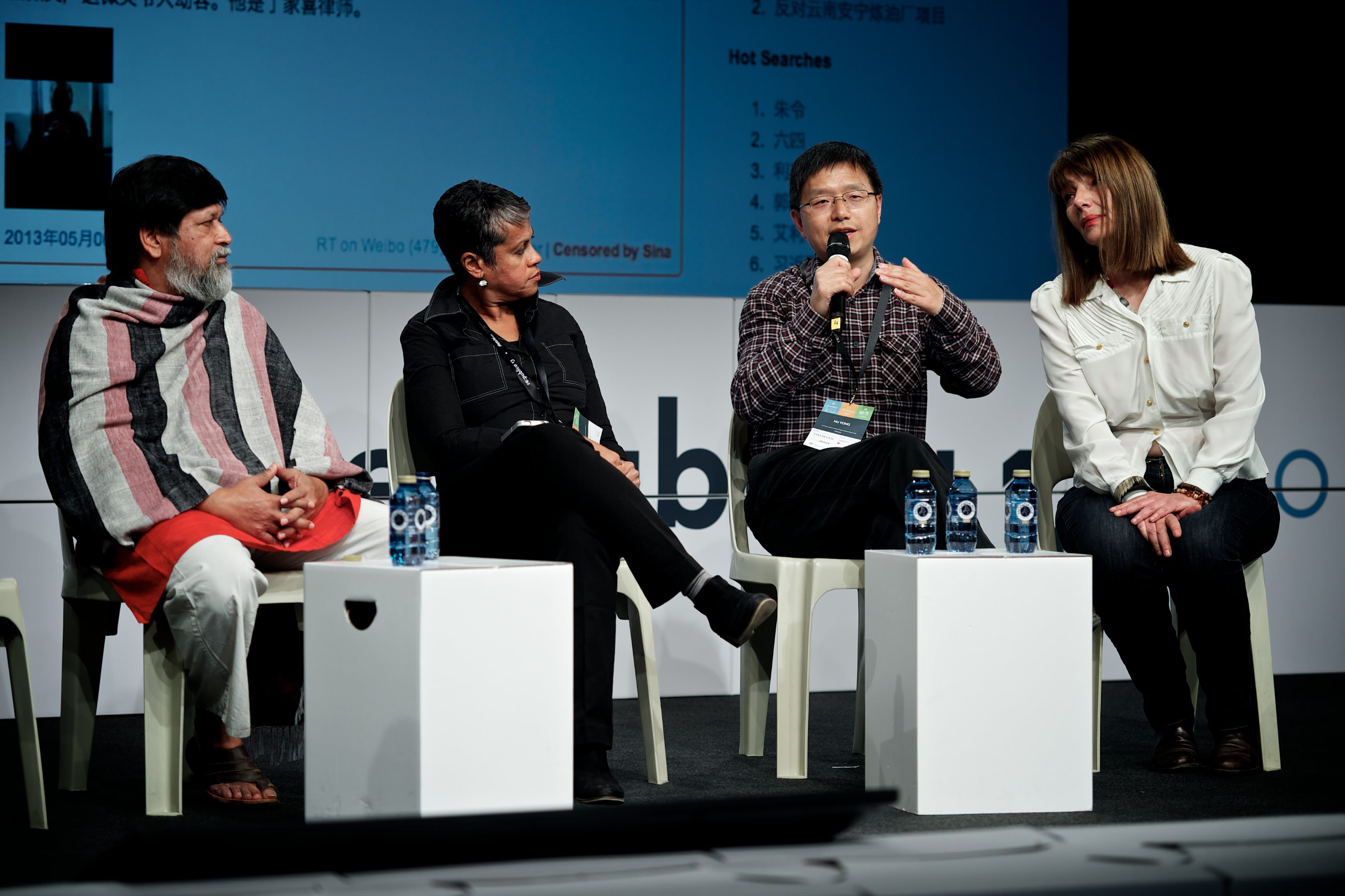
Alam with the winners of the 2013 BOBs awards.

In 1989, he set up Drik Picture Library, and in 1998, Pathshala South Asian Institute of Photography (later Pathshala South Asian Media Institute) in Dhaka. Pathshala "has trained hundreds of photographers". Alam founded the Chobi Mela International Photography Festival in 1999, the most important and prestigious photography festival in Asia, of which he remains a director. Alam set up the South Asian Media Academy.

Alam is among the last to have photographed Nelson Mandela. This was during a meeting between Professor Muhammad Yunus and Madiba on 10 July 2009, at the Nelson Mandela Foundation in Johannesburg.

Alam has covered news events including natural disasters, governmental upheavals, the deaths of garment factory workers, human rights abuses, the Bangladeshi government and military's repression and the "disappearances" of political opponents.

He was a member of the jury board of The BOBs' award.

== Repression Awami League government ==
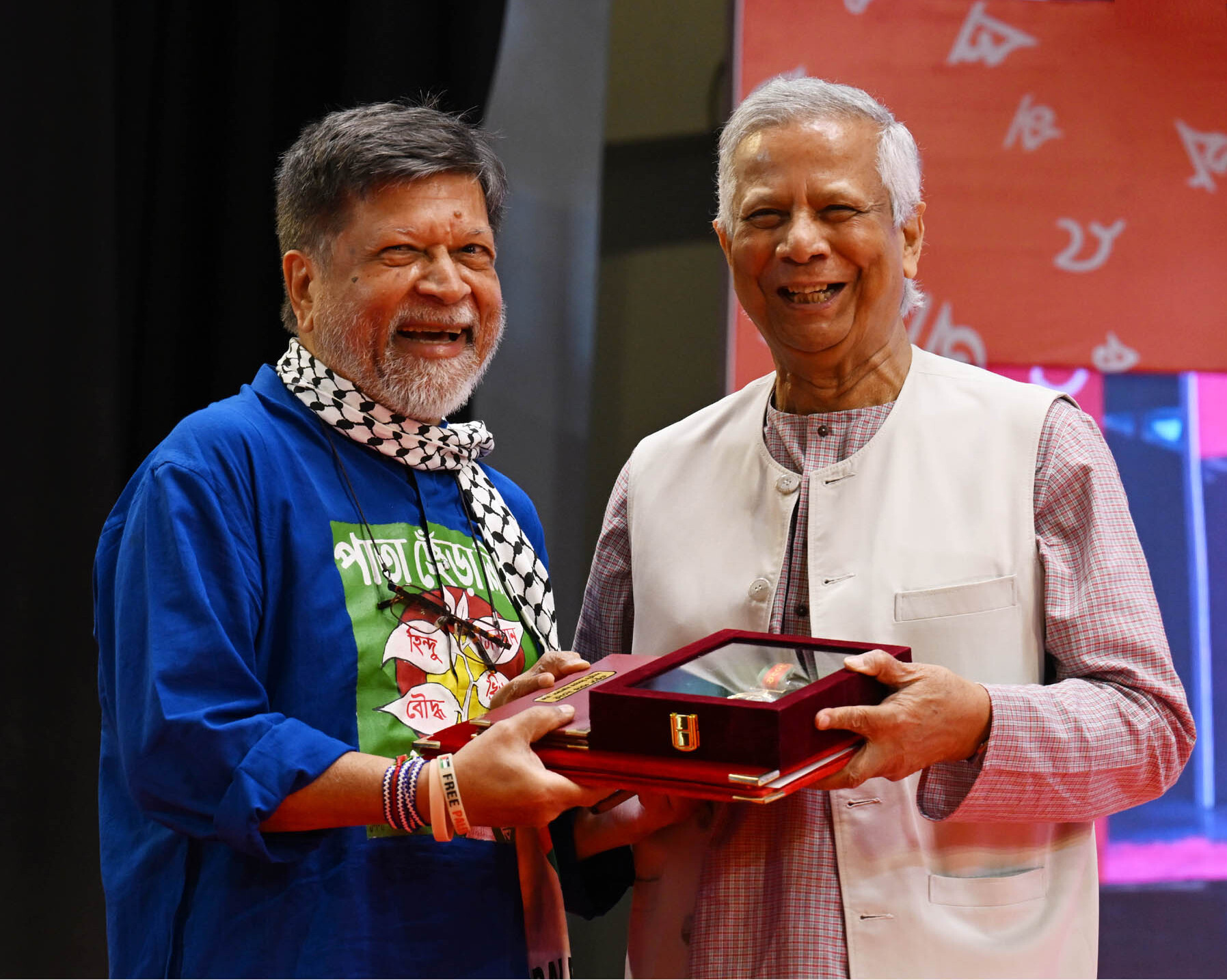
Alam receiving Ekushey Padak from Muhammad Yunus in 2025

=== Crossfire Exhibition (2010) ===
Crossfire is a series of photographs taken by Shahidul Alam. The exhibition was curated by Jorge Villacorta, a Peruvian art critic, curator, and Alam's colleague. Completed in 2010, it was displayed at Drik Gallery in Dhaka. The photographs are scenographies of extrajudicial killings, widely attributed to Bangladesh's Rapid Action Battalion (RAB).

Human Rights Watch has described RAB as a "death squad" due to these reported killings. Established in 2004 as a paramilitary force to combat gangsters and street violence, by late 2007, RAB had already been accused of over 350 extrajudicial killings and the torture of hundreds more.

Citing concerns that the exhibition's focus on extrajudicial killings would "create anarchy," RAB, along with local police, forcibly shut down Drik Gallery before the opening and barricaded the venue, sparking nationwide protests.

After Drik's lawyers served legal notice on the government, the police barricade was removed. The court's response and subsequent events allowed Drik to open the exhibition for public viewing on 31 March.

=== Bangladesh Road-Safety Protests (2018) ===
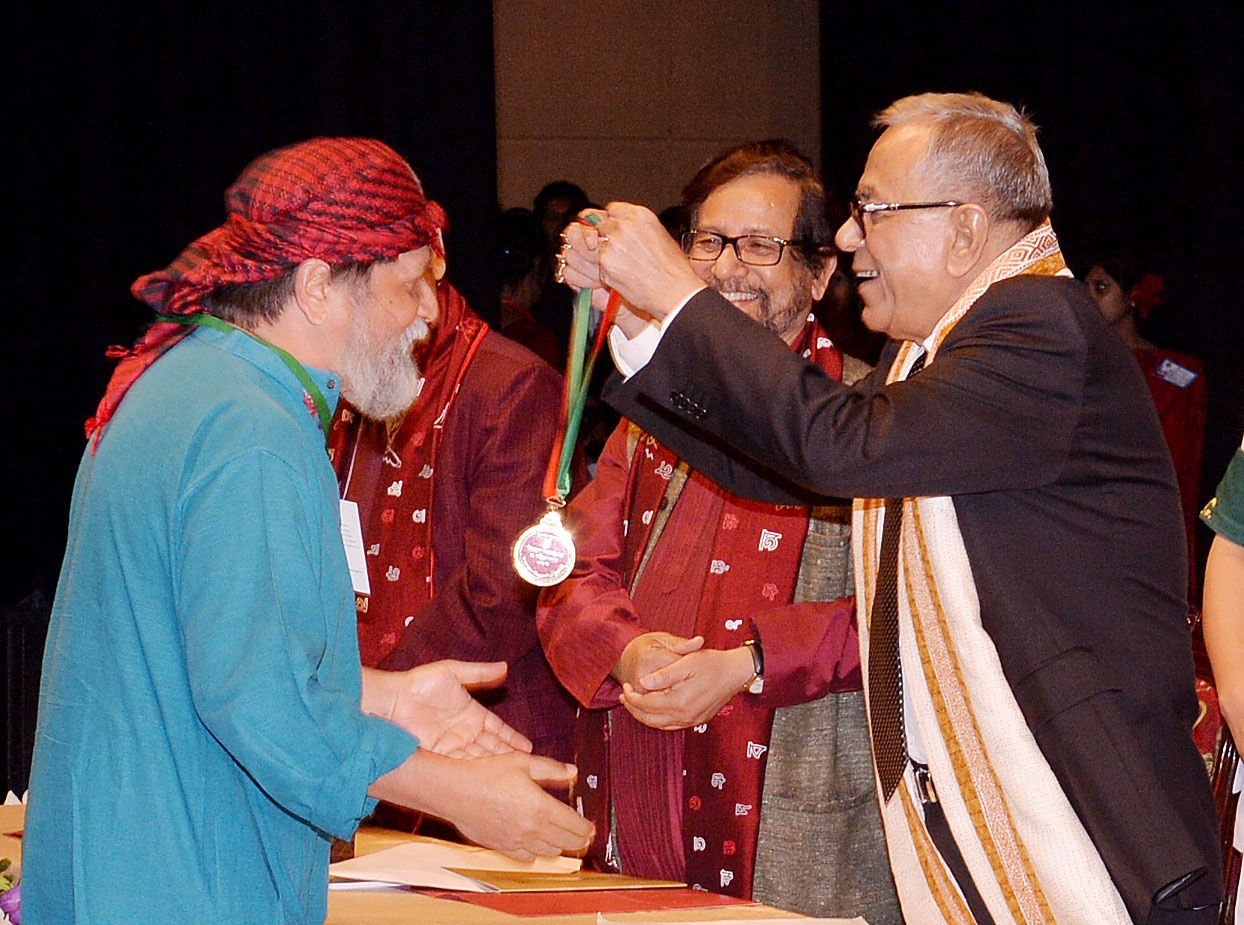
Alam receiving Shilpakala Padak from Mohammad Abdul Hamid (2014)

On 5 August 2018, journalist David Bergman tweeted that Shahidul Alam had been taken from his home in Dhanmondi by 30 to 35 plainclothes police officers. This occurred shortly after Alam gave a live interview with Al Jazeera, where he criticized the government's violent response to the 2018 Bangladesh road-safety protests, which he had also been documenting through live videos on Facebook.

Alam was believed to have been arrested for saying that the protests "stemmed from anger about widespread government corruption, and not just the bus accident that initially sparked them."

The following morning, Alam was shown arrested by the Dhaka Metropolitan Police. Furthermore, he was charged under Section 57 of the Information and Communication Technology Act and remanded for seven days. Alam told the court that he had been tortured while in police custody.

On 7 August, the Supreme Court halted the seven-day remand, and after observing his physical condition, ordered authorities to admit him to a hospital. Alam was taken to a hospital on 8 August at 9 am. However, he was taken back to the office of the Detective Branch of police again at 2 pm on the same day. Alam's lawyer, Sara Hossain, said the case would not stand in court.

After 107 days of imprisonment, Alam was granted bail by the Bangladesh High Court and released on 20 November 2018.

Since then, he has challenged the legality of Section 57 of the ICT Act with the Bangladesh Supreme Court after his challenge was rejected by the Bangladesh High Court.

Shahidul Alam has recounted some of his experiences of imprisonment in a response to Arundhati Roy's open letter to him while he was in jail.

The push for Alam's release was global. Amnesty International and the Committee to Protect Journalists urged the Bangladeshi government to immediately release Alam without filing charges, as did the Mumbai Press Club, Bombay News Photographer Association, Reporters Without Borders, PEN International, Pulitzer Center on Crisis Reporting, Prince Claus Fund and its network partners, Free Press Unlimited, World Press Photo Foundation, United Nations human rights experts, and the European Parliament.

Hollywood star Sharon Stone posted a letter on Twitter demanding his unconditional release, with signatories including Jimmy Wales. Many of those who signed her letter also endorsed a revised statement issued the following day by the Robert F. Kennedy Human Rights organisation. Signatories to that statement included Archbishop Desmond Tutu, Shirin Ebadi, Tawakkol Karman, Richard Branson, Richard Curtis, Professor Muhammad Yunus, Óscar Arias Sánchez, José Manuel Ramos-Horta, and Gro Harlem Brundtland, amongst others.

A joint statement from leading British artists and curators included signatories such as Anish Kapoor, Akram Khan, and Steve McQueen. A statement released by World Press Photo 100 days into Alam's detention was signed by Romila Thapar and Salima Hashmi. Separate statements of support came from Urvashi Butalia, Faisal Edhi (son of Abdul Sattar Edhi), Angela Y. Davis, Vijay Prashad, Arundhati Roy, and Noam Chomsky. Additionally, 426 academics from various universities in Australia called on the government of Bangladesh to release him immediately.

In Dhaka, on 16 October, around 100 photographers formed a human chain at the base of Raju Memorial Sculpture under the banner of "Shahidul Alam Er Muktir Dabitey Alokchitribrindo".

On the other hand, Sajeeb Wazed, the son of Bangladeshi former Prime Minister Sheikh Hasina, questioned those defending and demanding freedom for Alam in a controversial Facebook post.

=== Arundhati Roy at Chobi Mela X (2019) ===
On 4 March 2019, the Dhaka Metropolitan Police revoked an invitation for Arundhati Roy's talk with Shahidul Alam, programmed during the 10th edition of Chobi Mela International Photography Festival. After 24 hours of uncertainty, the organizers of Chobi Mela finally held her talk at an alternative venue.

== Free Palestine Movement ==
=== Biennale für aktuelle Fotografie (2024) ===
On 21 November 2023, authorities from the German cities of Mannheim, Ludwigshafen, and Heidelberg canceled the 10th edition of the Biennale für aktuelle Fotografie, scheduled for March 2024. The decision followed criticism by Shahidul Alam via his social media platforms of Israeli attacks on Palestinians in Gaza following 7 October 2023. The Biennale's board and cultural affairs departments of the three cities labeled his posts as "antisemitic". In agreement with its longstanding sponsor BASF, the Biennale was officially canceled, citing Alam's online activity.

In response, Alam stated that the Biennale had "incorrectly equated" criticism of the project of Israel with antisemitism: "We feel that the failure to draw a distinction between criticism of a government and of a people is irresponsible and damaging to the honesty of public discourse."

In an interview with Al Jazeera, he added, "I am an anti-Zionist, which means I am against colonialism, settler colonialism, racism, apartheid, and genocide. I am not an anti-Semite, and it's most unfortunate that Germany chooses to conflate the two, [as this] serves and furthers the white supremacist agenda."

=== Return honorary doctorate UAL (2024) ===
In 2024, Alam returned an honorary doctorate that had been awarded to him by the University of the Arts London in 2022. The reason for his decision is the university's ongoing complicity in Israel's occupation of Palestine.

=== Freedom Flotilla Coalition (2025) ===
On 27 September 2025, Shahidul Alam became the first Bangladeshi to join the Freedom Flotilla Coalition, an international civil society initiative aimed at challenging the Gaza blockade and expressing solidarity with the Palestinian people. The "Media Flotilla"s vessel, Conscience, departed from Italy on 30 September 2025. During the voyage, Alam released video messages reaffirming his commitment to reach Gaza despite potential risks. On 8 October 2025, he was detained by Israeli forces in international waters. He was released two days later, on 10 October, and subsequently traveled to Turkey. Shahidul Alam returned to Bangladesh on 11 October 2025.

== Publications ==
=== Author ===
- Shahidul Alam: Singed but not burned. Edited by Ina Puri. Kolkota: Emami Art, 2023.
- The Tide Will Turn. Göttingen, Germany: Steidl, 2019. ISBN 978-3-95829-693-0.
- My Journey as a Witness. Skira, 2011. Edited by Rosa Maria Falvo. ISBN 978-88-572-0966-1.
- Portraits of Commitment. UNAIDS, 2009.
- Nature's Fury. Hibrida; London: Concern Worldwide, 2007. ISBN 978-0955029974. Text in English and Urdu.

=== Editor ===
- Ways of Life. Dhaka, Bangladesh: Drik Picture Library, 2014. Edited by Alam. ISBN 9789843383099. With an introduction by Rubana Huq.
- Under the Banyan Tree. Dhaka, Bangladesh: Pathshala, South Asian Media Academy, 2011. Edited by Alam. ISBN 9789843334442.
- Blink: 100 photographers, 10 curators, 10 writers. New York: Phaidon, 2002. 2004, ISBN 978-0714844589. Alam was a joint curator.

=== Published works ===
- "What One Person Can Do: The Amazing Life of Abdul Sattar Edhi". Written by Richard Covington, photographs by Shahidul Alam. In: What Matters: The World's Preeminent Photojournalists and Thinkers Depict Essential Issues of Our Time (2008) edited by David Elliot Cohen.
- "Humanitarian to a Nation: Abdul Sattar Edhi". Published in: Aramco World (2004). Written by Richard Covington, photographs by Shahidul Alam.

== Exhibitions ==
=== Own work ===
- 2024. Singed but not burned. Sakshi Art Gallery, Mumbai, 25 April – 22 May 2024.
- 2019–2021. Shahidul Alam: Truth to Power. Rubin Museum of Art, New York City.
- 2012, Kochi-Muziris Biennale, Kerala, India.

=== Curator ===
- 2010, Where Three Dreams Cross at Whitechapel Gallery, London. (co-curator)

== Professorships ==
- Royal Melbourne Institute of Technology (RMIT)
- University of Sunderland

== Awards ==
- 2014: Shilpakala Padak, Shilpakala Academy, Dhaka, Bangladesh
- 2018: Humanitarian Award, Lucie Awards
- 2018: Tribute Award, Frontline Club, UK for his contribution to journalism
- 2019: Special Presentation Award 2019, International Center of Photography (ICP)
- 2020: CPJ International Press Freedom Awards 2020
- 2025: Ekushey Padak
