= Andrew Biraj =

Bangladeshi photojournalist

- Born: 1982 (age 43–44); Dhaka
- Education: University of Bolton
- Occupation: Photojournalist
- Writing career
- Notable awards: World Press Photo, Joop Swart Masterclass, POY(i), BOP (NPPA), Atlanta Photojournalism Seminar Contest, China International Press Photo Contest (CHIPP)
- Website: www.andrew-biraj.com

Andrew Biraj (Bengali: এন্ড্রু বিরাজ; born 1982) is a Bangladeshi photojournalist.

== Biography ==
Andrew Biraj is a Bangladeshi photojournalist currently based in Washington DC. Biraj has worked for the international news agencies Reuters, AFP, The New York Times, Sipa Press and Getty Images.

He holds an advanced diploma in photography from Pathshala, the South Asian Institute Media Academy in Bangladesh, and a B.A (honors) in photography & video from the University of Bolton, UK. Biraj is a winner of the prestigious 2008 World Press Photo Joop Swart Masterclass grant. He has won numerous national and international awards including Best Portfolio (in 2013) and a second prize (in 2013) in The Atlanta Photojournalism Seminar Contest in the US, an Honorable Mention (in 2013) in the National Geographic Photo Contest, a third prize (in 2011) World Press Photo award in the Netherlands, a second prize (in 2013) in Pictures of the Year International by Missouri School of Journalism, a third prize (in 2010) and a first prize (in 2008) in the National Press Photographers Association of America's Best of Photojournalism awards; a gold award (in 2013) a silver award (in 2011) and a bronze (in 2007) in the China International Press Photo Contest; the 2010 Award of Excellence in Feature Photography, from the Society of Publishers in Asia, and the 2010 South Asian Journalists Association award for an outstanding photograph about South Asia. Biraj has been published in National Geographic magazine, Time magazine, The New York Times, International Herald Tribune, Wall Street Journal, Los Angeles Times, The Guardian, The Observer, The Times, Paris Photo, Le Monde, Sydney Morning Herald, Newsweek, Stern, Asian Geo, Hindustan Times and many other international publications. His work has been featured in exhibitions and screenings worldwide, including Visa Pour l'Image, in Perpignan, France, the Angkor Photo Festival in Cambodia, Yangon Photo Festival in Myanmar, the International Photography Biennial of the Islamic World in Iran, Noorderlicht Photo Festival in The Netherlands, the Kiyosato Museum of Photographic Arts in Japan, the Church of Santa Maria della Pietà in Venice, Italy, the National Art Gallery in Malaysia, Drik Gallery and in The University of Dhaka, Bangladesh. Biraj exhibited his long-term project Bonded Stitches & Struggle; Testimony of Life In Bangladesh’s Garment Industry, on the one year anniversary of the collapse of Rana Plaza, which has been attended by more than 10,000 visitors in Bangladesh. The exhibition took place from April 22- May 1, 2014, simultaneously in three different venues including an open-air show near the collapsed building site in Savar, Bangladesh.

Biraj has been invited to nominate candidates from more than 65 countries of Asia and Africa for the 2017 Prince Claus Fund Awards in The Netherlands. He was also a nominator of 2017 UNICEF Photographer of the Year competition and a professional portfolio reviewer for the graduate student in Corcoran School of the Arts and Design in George Washington University in Washington DC. He has also been in the jury panel in numerous photography competitions and exhibitions in Bangladesh arranged by Dhaka University Photography Society, BUET Photography Society, Bangladesh in Frames by Through The Lens Bangladesh, Rabi Telecom and many others. Biraj is the co founder and a lifetime member of Counter Foto Photography Department in Bangladesh, which was established in 2012. Biraj is a co-editor and co-author of the book Under the Banyon Tree! He self-published his first book Insight in 2011. Counter Foto published his second book Bonded Stitches & Struggle; Testimony of Life In Bangladesh’s Garment Industry (Bengali Version) in April, 2014.

== Exhibitions and screenings ==
- Visa Pour l'Image, Perpignan, France
- Open exhibition near collapsed Rana Plaza building site and University of Dhaka campus
- Angkor photo festival in Cambodia
- Yangon Photo Festival in Myanmar
- International Photography Biennial of the Islamic World in Iran
- Noorderlicht photo festival 'Act of Faith' in The Netherlands
- Kiyosato Museum of Photographic Arts in Japan
- National Art Gallery in Malaysia
- Drik Gallery in Bangladesh and University of Bolton in UK

== Bibliography ==
- Insight, 2011
- Bonded Stitches & Struggle; Testimony of Life In Bangladesh’s Garment Industry by Counter Foto, 2014
- Under the Banyan Tree by Pathshala 2010
- Our world Now by Reuters, 2010,2011, 2013
- Balance by World Press Photo

== Awards ==
- World Press Photo JoopSwart Masterclass grant in 2008.
- World Press Photo award, Third prize in 2011.
- Best Portfolio award in The Atlanta Photojournalism Seminar Contest in 2013.
- Pictures of the Year International, Second prize (in 2013).
- National Press Photographers Association of America's Best of Photojournalism awards, Third prize (in 2010) and a first prize (in 2008).
- National Geographic Photo award, Honorable Mention in 2013.
- China International Press Photo Contest, Gold award (in 2013), silver award (in 2011) and bronze (in 2007).
- Society of Publishers in Asia award, Award of Excellence in Feature Photography in 2011.
- South Asian Journalists Association award for an outstanding photograph about South Asia in 2010.
- FotoVisura Grant for Outstanding Personal Photography Project in 2015.
- PX3 Prix De La Photographie Paris, Honorable Mention in 2010.
- International Photography Awards, Honorable Mention in 2010.
- Venice International Photo Contest, Second Prize (in 2007)

== General references ==
- "Andrew Biraj | Visual Stories". Visura.
- "Counter Foto".
- Reuters Wider Image
- Boston Globe - The Big Picture
- New AgeAndrew Biraj in New Age
- Bangladesh Dreams- Vogue Italy
- Salam, Upashana (May 9, 2014). "His Pictures Speak a Thousand Words". The Daily Star.
- "Judge Panel". Bangladesh Youth Environmental Initiative. Archived from the original on 12 August 2013.
- "Andrew Biraj". The Daily Star. Archived from the original on 2014-09-03.
- "Andrew Biraj". THE FUNAMBULIST MAGAZINE. January 4, 2016.
- Vancouver Sun
