= China International Press Photo Contest =

Annual photography award

The China International Press Photo Contest (CHIPP) is an annual photography award organized by China Photojournalists Society launched in 2005 in Shenzhen. It is open to photojournalists and photographers from around the world.

Awards are divided between eight categories. One gold, one silver, one bronze prizes and 2 awards of excellence are selected in each of the categories and for both single images as well as photo stories. One photo is selected as the Photo of the Year from all of the gold prize winning photos.
