= Mohammad Rakibul Hasan =

Bangladeshi documentary photographer

- মোহাম্মদ রকিবুল হাসান
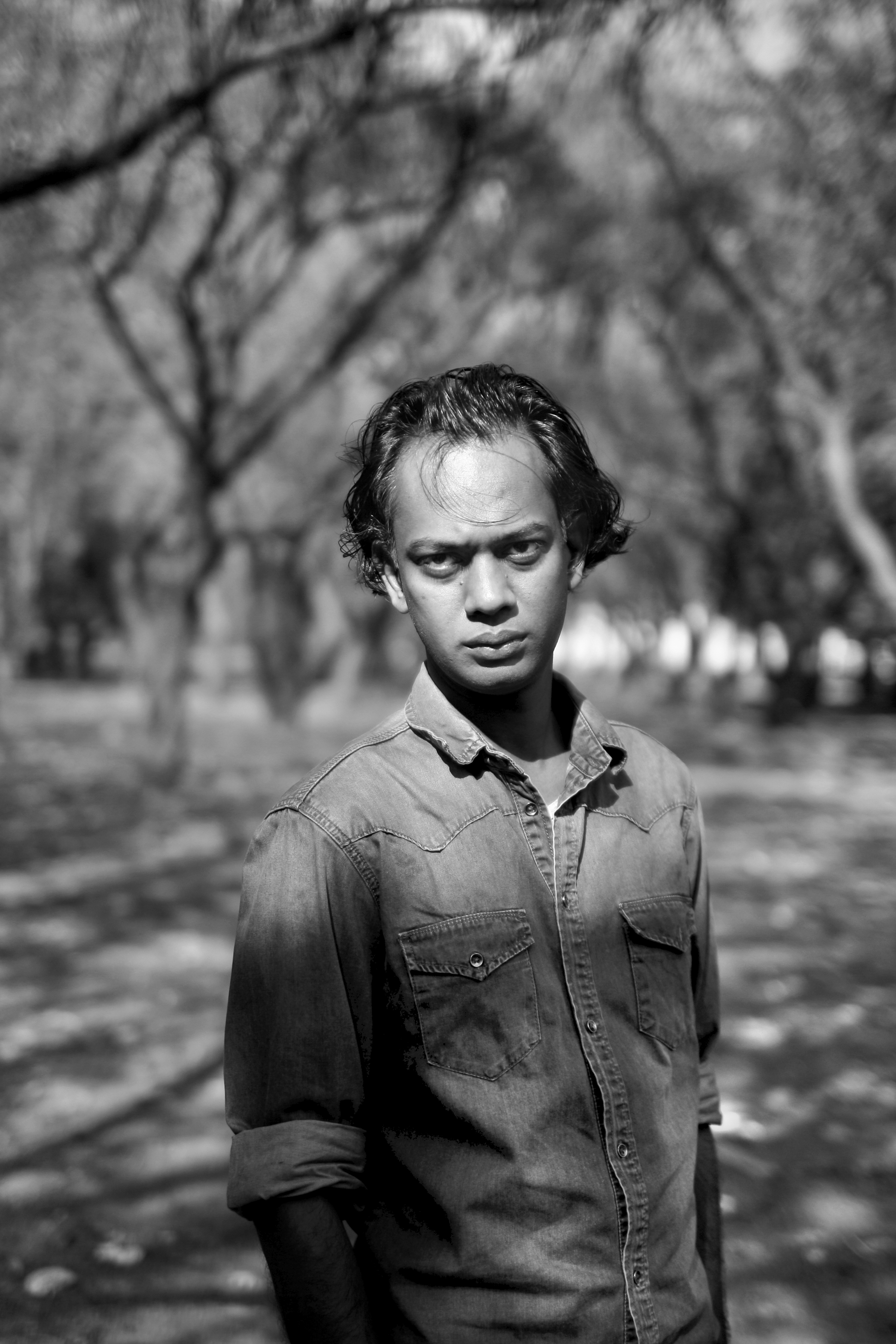
- Born: 29 September 1977 (age 48); Dhaka, Bangladesh
- Education: University of Oxford, Undergraduate Certificate: International Center of Photography; Falmouth University, BA (Hons): Ateneo de Manila University, Postgraduate Diploma: The University of Sydney
- Occupations: Photojournalist, Documentary Photographer, Filmmaker, Visual Artist
- Years active: 2002–present
- Known for: Documentary photography/film, photojournalism and visual art
- Notable credit(s): One World Media Awards 2022, Lucie Award, Human Rights Press Award, Allard Prize, Best New Talent 2020 in Prix de la Photographie - Paris (PX3), Joop Swart Masterclass, UNICEF photo of the year
- Spouse: Fabeha Monir
- Website: mohammadrakibulhasan.com

Mohammad Rakibul Hasan (Bengali: মোহাম্মাদ রকিবুল হাসান; born 29 September 1977), also known as M R Hasan, is a Bangladeshi journalist, documentary photographer, photojournalist, filmmaker and visual artist. He has made black and white photographs about climate change, political violence and the Rohingya refugee crisis. He has also been practicing fine art photography and digital art for many years.

Hasan was awarded the One World Media Awards 2022, and Lucie Awards Discovery of the Year 2018. He also received the 23rd Human Rights Press Awards for his series "The Looted Honor" on rape survivors of Rohingya Refugee from The Foreign Correspondents’ Club Hong Kong, Amnesty International and the Hong Kong Journalists Association that recognizes top reporting on Asian news.

== Early life and education ==
Hasan was born in a small town in Sherpur, Bangladesh; he was the youngest of five children. Hasan was brought up in a middle-class Muslim family. He had a rich library in his home where he spent a long time reading literature and looking at art. He was passionate about painting from early childhood and practised writing Bengali poetry.

Hasan was introduced to photography while studying Film & Video Production at UBS Film School (Sydney Film School) at the University of Sydney. His interest in photography led him to become a professional photographer when he returned to Bangladesh. Hasan was granted a full scholarship from the World Press Photo (WPP) in the Netherlands to study for a Postgraduate Diploma in Photojournalism at Ateneo de Manila University, Philippines. He studied for a Certificate of Higher Education in History of Art at the University of Oxford and studied for a One-Year Certificate in Creative Practices receiving a Director's Fellowship at the International Center of Photography (ICP). He also earned a BA (Hons) in Photography from Falmouth University.

== Work ==
Hasan's work has been used by the BBC and elsewhere in newspapers, magazines, online media, and books. His photo stories include Park Life, Salt, Wave, and I am Rohingya. He is the admin of Bangladeshi Photographers (BP) photography community, which he created in 2005.

== Exhibitions ==
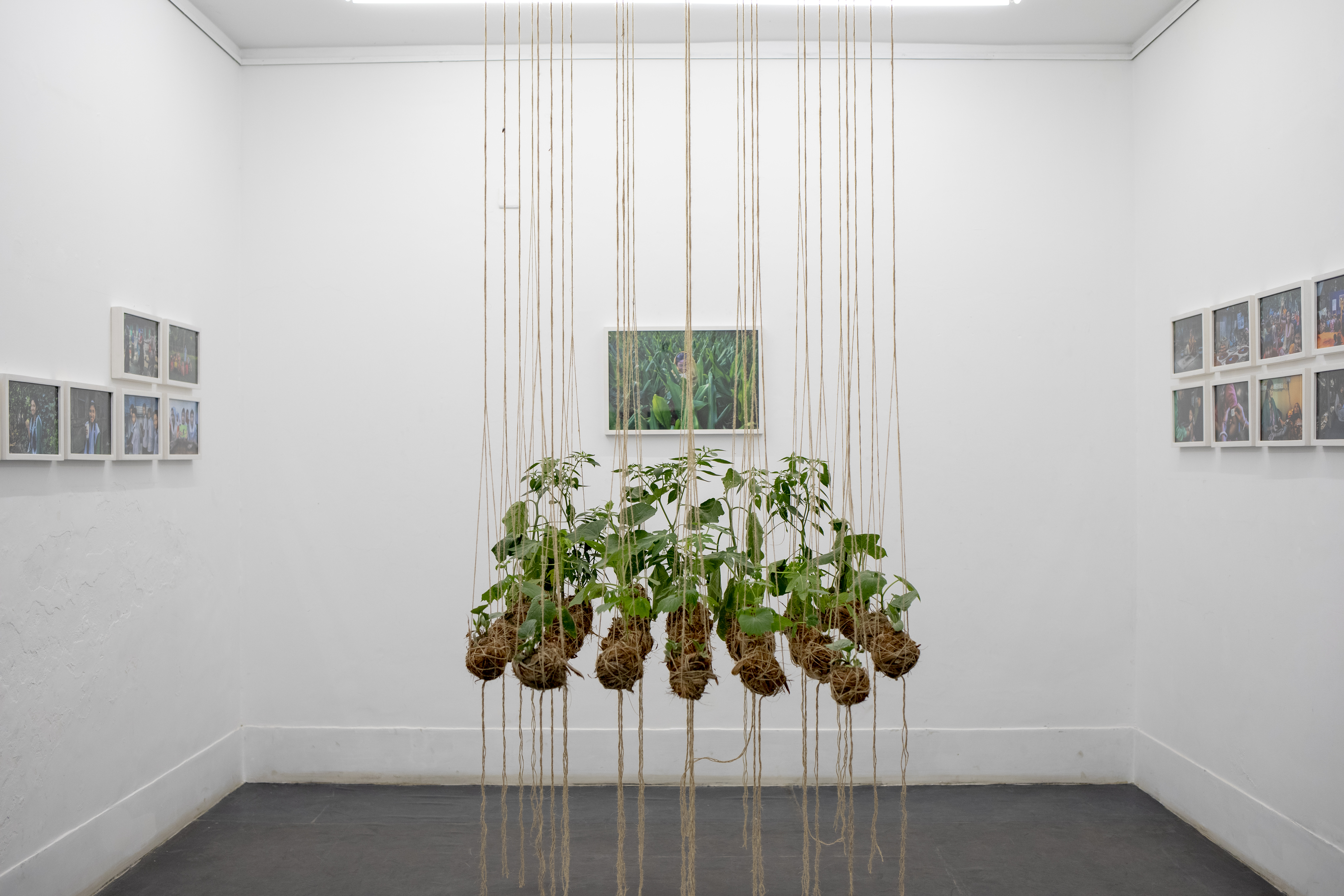
Nutrition Stories - Collaborative Responsibility for Change by M R Hasan and Kala Kendra, Dhaka

- Nutrition Stories - Collaborative Responsibility for Change
- Photo Basal Festival 2020, Switzerland, "The Last Savings", a photo series presented by Clair Gallery
- Belgrade Photo Month Festival 2018, Serbia, a solo exhibition of "I am Rohingya" photo essay
- Transcendence through images, a solo digital and appropriation art exhibition at Hotel La Meridian Dhaka, Bangladesh, 2018
- Solo Exhibition selection for the "I am Rohingya" series at Belgrade Photo Month 2018, Serbia
- 10th Anniversary of Social Documentary Photography (SDN), at Bronx Documentary Center, USA 2018
- ArtèFoto Exhibition 2011, Italy
- Ian Parry Scholarship Exhibition 2011, Getty Image Gallery, London
- People & Planet International Photo Exhibition 2010, Fitzroy, Melbourne, Australia
- Environmental Photographer of the Year 2010 Exhibition, Air Gallery, Mayfair, England
- Food Security Photo Exhibition 2010, Alliance Francaise Gallery, Dhaka, Bangladesh
- The Marginal Lives duet Photo Exhibition 2009, Impressions Gallery, Gulshan, Dhaka, Bangladesh
- Microfinance Photo Exhibition at Crédit Agricole, Paris, 2008 (inaugurated by Muhammad Yunus)

== Awards ==
- 2016: Grand Prize Winner, L.B. Brown Memorial Prize 2015, APAN, Japan
- 2017: 2nd Prize in Fine Art category, The 4th Global Student Photography Contest 2017, China
- 2017: Award of Excellence, United Nations Information Center (UNIC) and Sophia University, Japan 2017
- 2017: 2nd Runner-up, International Photo Competition on Sustainable Lifestyle 2017, CIDSE Together for Global Justice,
- 2017: Bronze Prize under Single Image Daily life Category, Life Press Photo Award 2017, Ukraine
- 2018: Lucie Awards Discovery of the Year
- Grant Recipient from The Global Research Programme on Inequality (GRIP) on the Imaging Inequality Photography Project partnership with the Bergen University, 2022, Norway
- 3rd Prize, "The Hunter", GEF Biodiversity Video Contest 2010, Global Environmental Facility (GEF), USA
- 2nd Runner Up, "The Effects of Climate Change", My View on Asia Pacific Climate Change Short Film Contest 2010, Asian Development Bank (ADB), Philippines
- The Best Talent Award 2020 for the series of "The Last Savings", Px3, Paris
- One of the Winners among three from Thomson Reuters Foundation (TRF) and Omidyar Network's 'COVID-19: The Bigger Picture' photo competition 2020, UK
- Student Winner of Bar-Tur Photo Award 2020 for the series "Salt" under the contest theme of "Climate Change."
- Gold Winner for the two photo series "I am Rohingya" and "The Last Savings" under the Professional Category of Editorial Photography, 2020 Budapest International Foto Awards 2020
- Winner of COVID-19 Reflections, Bar-Tur Photo Award 2020 for the series "The Last Savings."
- Winner for the project "I am Rohingya", 100 Best Art, Design & Photography Competition and Book Publication 2019 by Creative Quarterly, New York
- 2nd Place in the Deeper Perspective category at International Photography Awards (IPA) 2020, USA
- 5th Place in the Humanitarian category for the long-term project "I am Rohingya" at Imagely Documentary Project Fund & Fellowship 2019–2020, USA
