= Drik Picture Library =

Bangladeshi photography agency and school

- দৃক
- Type: Private
- Headquarters: Dhaka, Bangladesh
- Fields: Photography
- Owner: Shahidul Alam
- Website: drik.net

Drik Picture Library is a photography agency and picture library based in Dhaka, Bangladesh.

== Background ==
Drik Picture Library was established in 1989 by Bangladeshi writer and photographer Shahidul Alam and Bangladeshi writer and anthropologist Rahnuma Ahmed. The name is Sanskrit for 'vision'. It was set up to provide a platform for local photographers to publish internationally and provides various media services.

Drik is associated with Alam's other large project: Majority World which aims to promote photographers from the global south and ensure fair compensation for their work. Drik is headquartered in Dhaka and has branch offices in India and the UK.

== Pathshala South Asian Media Institute ==
Pathshala, the South Asian Media Institute, was set up in 1998 by the Bangladeshi photographer, writer, and activist Shahidul Alam, as "Pathshala South Asian Institute of Photography". It is affiliated with Sunderland University and Bolton University in the UK; Oslo University College in Norway; Edith Cowan University in Australia; and The Danish School of Media and Journalism.

In 2019, Pathshala introduced a four-year Bachelor of Social Science in photography program in affiliation with the University of Dhaka. Prior to that, the certificates awarded by Pathshala for completion of its educational programs were not recognized by Bangladeshi universities. Its students engage in social movements with their work. The school has received death threats in response to their work.

=== Students ===
Student awards have included first prize in World Press Photo Contest, The National Geographic All Roads Awards, and the Prix Pictet. Several students have made it to the Photo District News' 'PDN's 30 2008' Alumna Taslima Akhter has won several awards, including the Best Photographer Award from the 5th Dali International Photography Exhibition in China.

Other alumni include: GMB Akash, Munem Wasif, Andrew Biraj, Prito Reza, Sarker Protick, Saiful Huq Omi, and Khaled Hasan.
