= Chobi Mela International Photography Festival =

Photography festival held in Dhaka, Bangladesh

Chobi Mela
- Status: Active
- Genre: Photography
- Frequency: Biennial
- Locations: Dhaka, Bangladesh
- Years active: 2000–present
- Inaugurated: 30 November 2000
- Most recent: 5 March 2021 (Shunno edition)
- Next event: 2025 (XI edition)
- Participants: Photographers, artists, educators
- Organizer: Drik Picture Library. and Pathshala South Asian Media Institute
- Website: chobimela.org

Chobi Mela is a biennial international festival of photography held in Dhaka, Bangladesh. It is the largest festival of photography held in Asia.

Chobi Mela has had ten editions by 2019 and adapting to digital formats with a special "Shunno" edition in 2021 due to the COVID-19 pandemic.

== Impact and significance ==
Chobi Mela's thematic focus—addressing issues like exclusion, resistance, and transition—encourages dialogue on social and cultural challenges.
