= Zamindars of Bengal =

Hereditary landlords in Bengal

- বাংলার জমিদার
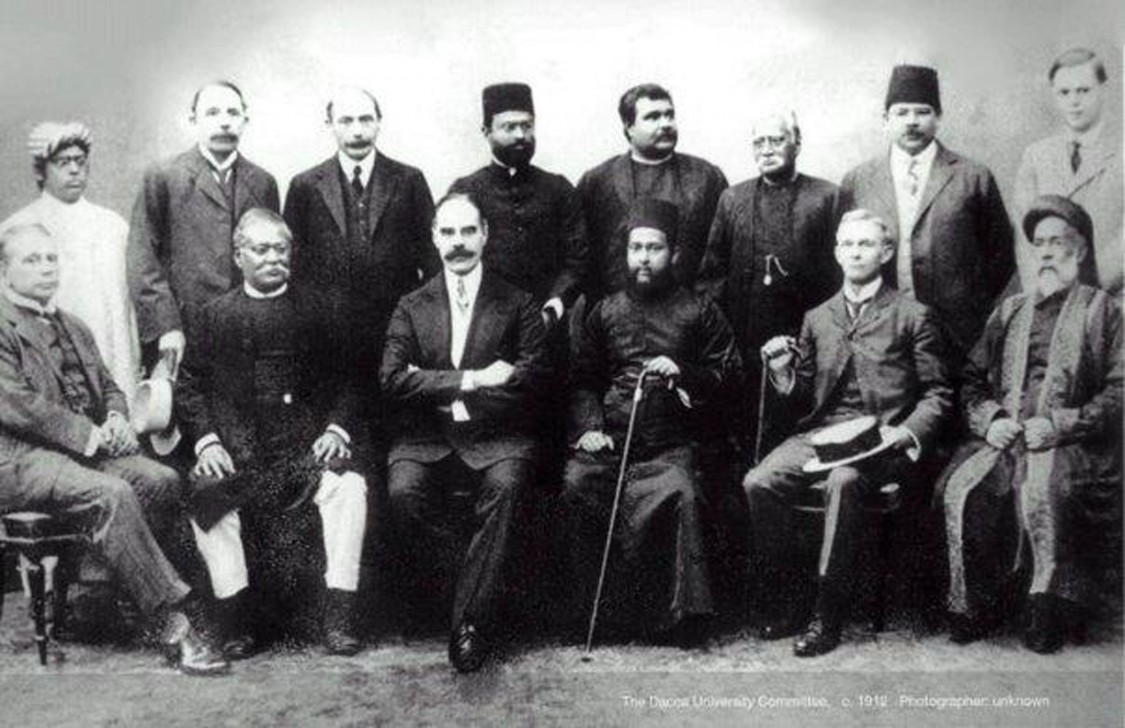
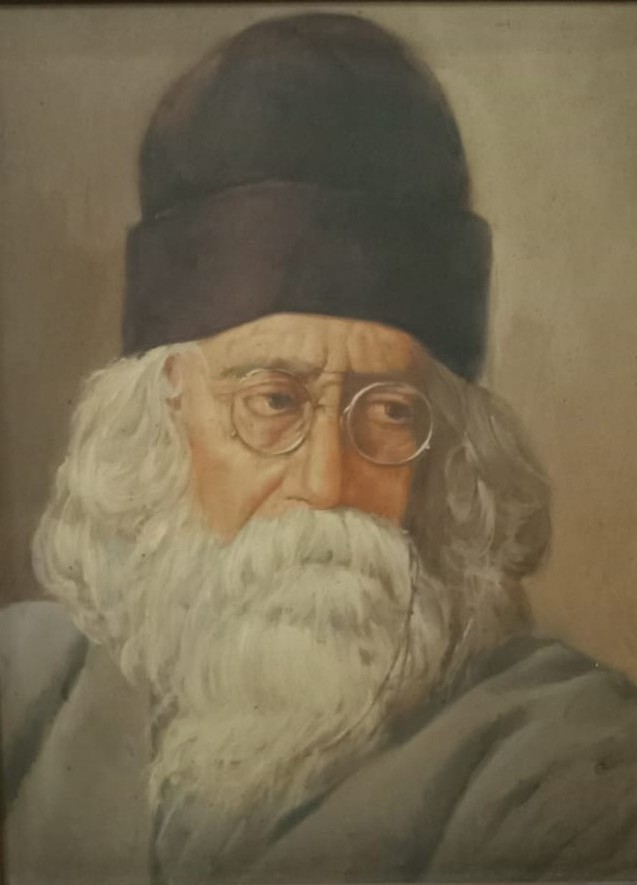
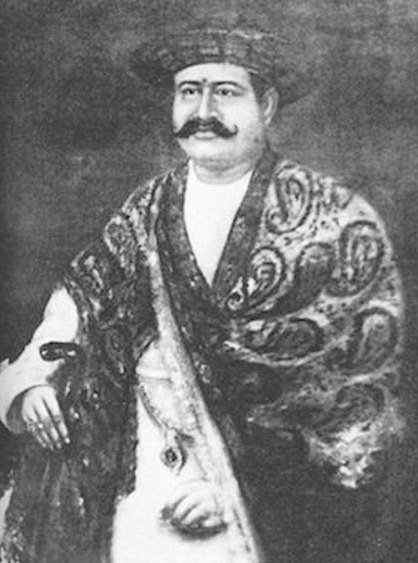
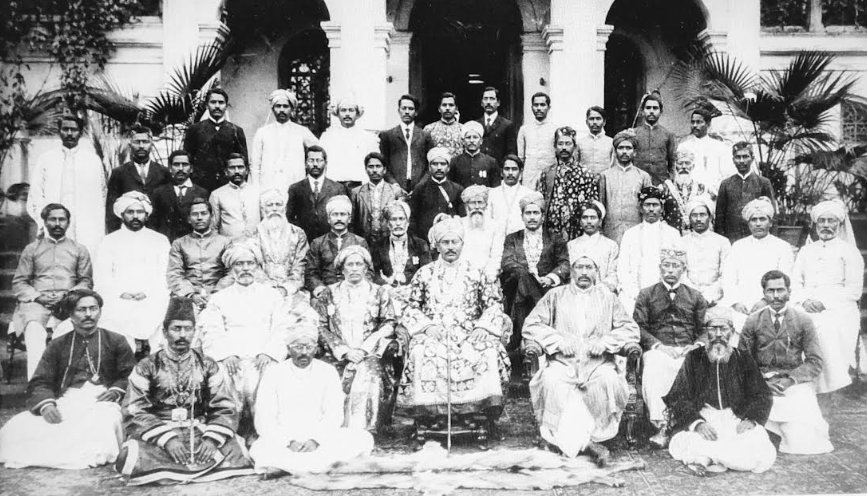
- Top: Nathan Committee. Middle: Tagore at Ahsan Manzil, Rajchandra Das of Janbazar Raj. Bottom: Dhar Zamindars of Dhar Raj.
- Dissolved: 1951
- Official languages: Bengali, Persian, English

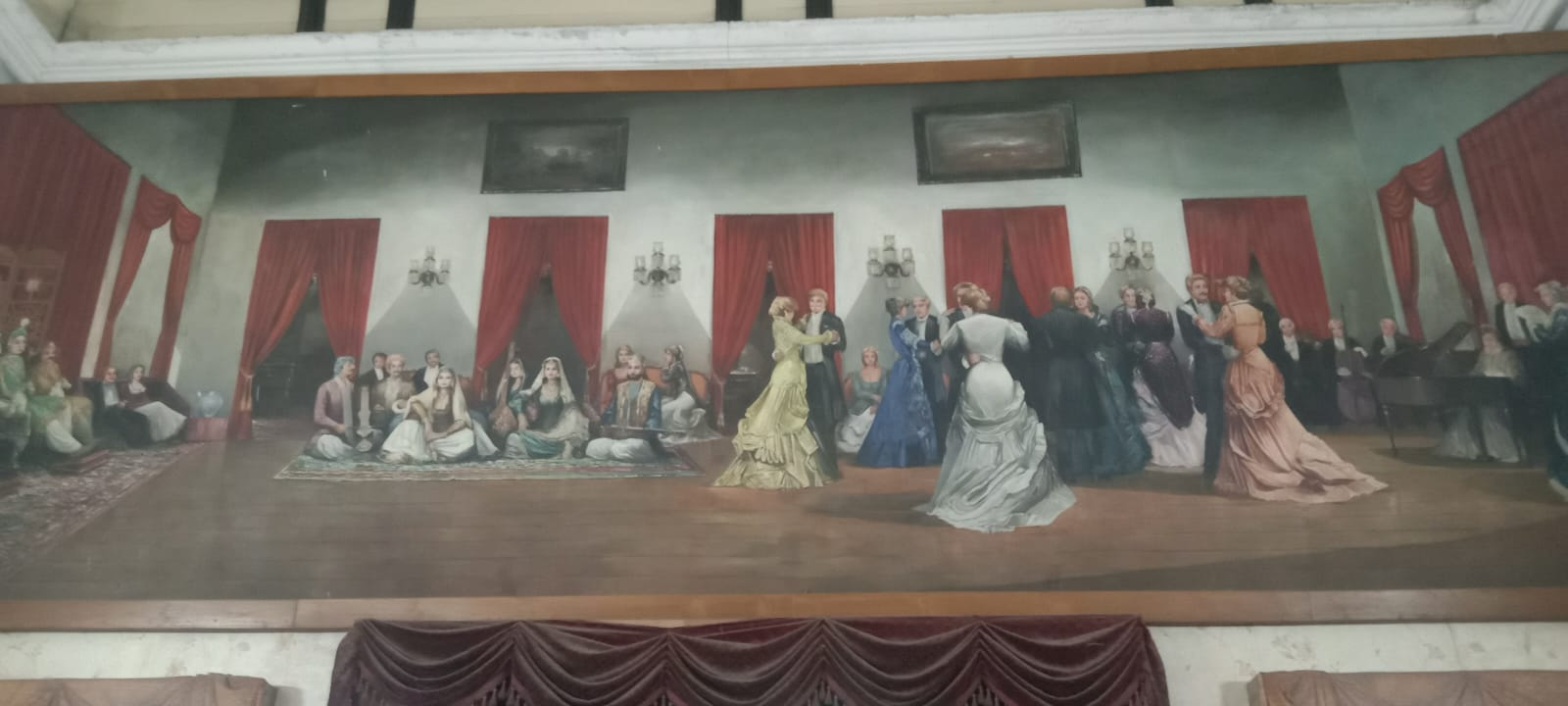
An evening of Indian classical music and European ballroom dance hosted by the Urdu-speaking Nawab of Dhaka at Ahsan Manzil in Dhaka in the 19th century

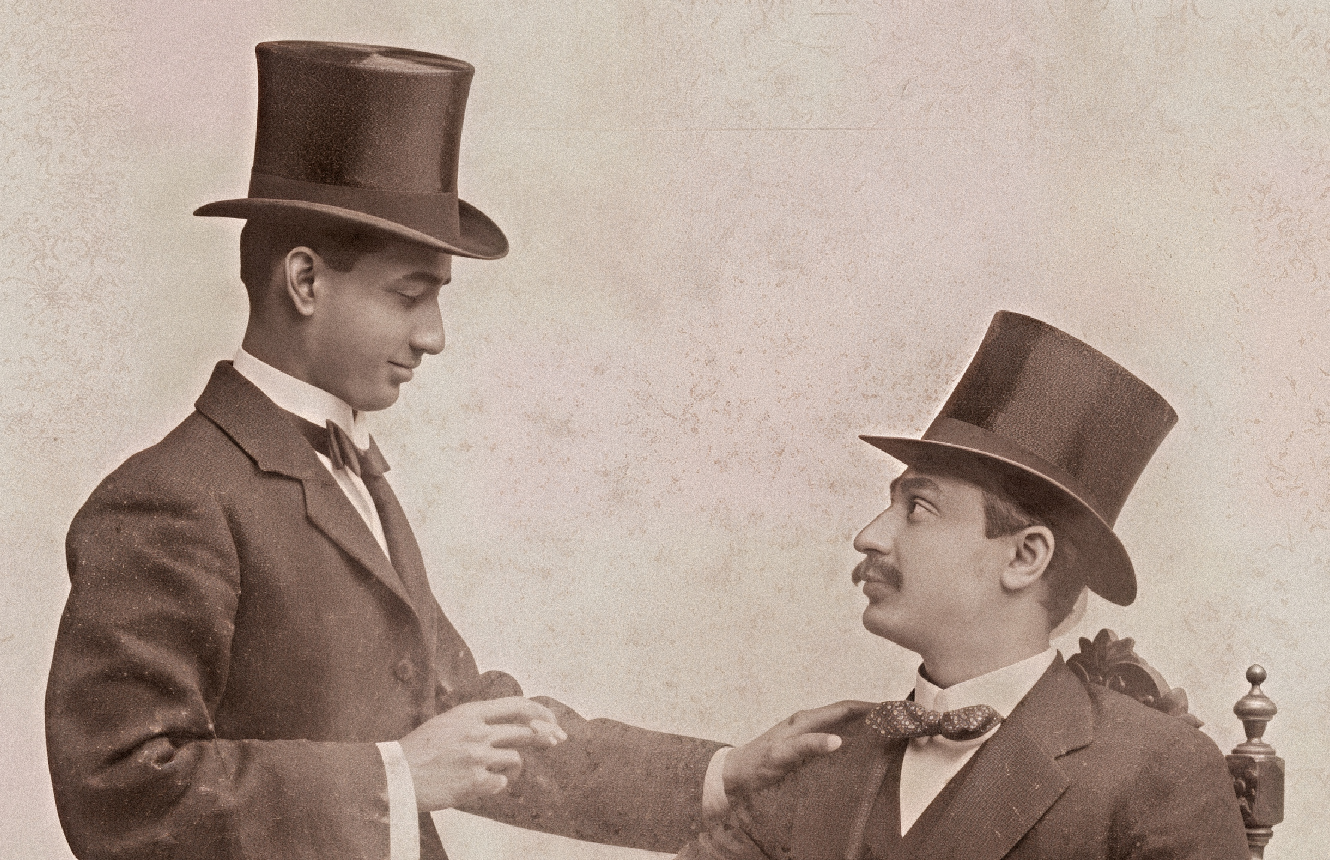
Barristers A. S. M. Latifur Rahman (1892–1964) of Faridpur and Ashraf Ali Khan Chowdhury (1878–1941) of Natore at the Inns of Court

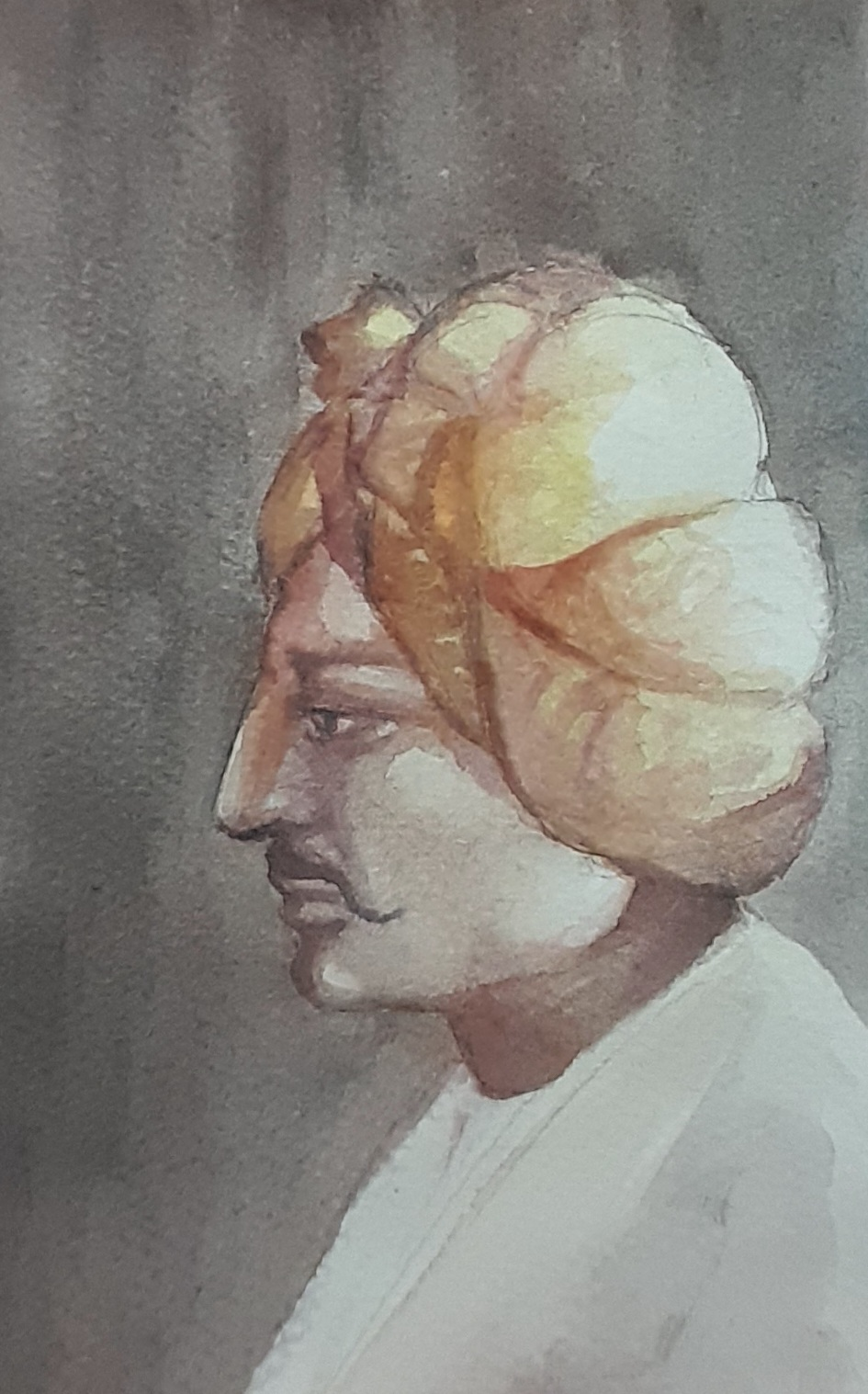
Munshi Balaram Das of Kadirpara Estate

The zamindars of Bengal were zamindars (hereditary landlords) of the Bengal region of the Indian subcontinent (now divided between Bangladesh and the Indian state of West Bengal). They governed an ancient system of land ownership.

The Bengali zamindars managed a plantation economy in the Bengal Presidency that produced cotton, jute, indigo, rice, wheat, tea, spices, and other commodities. Like the British landed gentry, they were bestowed with titles; their plantation economy has been studied by many scholars and can be compared with historic plantation complexes in the Southern United States. The land was cultivated by tenant farmers who paid rent to the zamindars. A big portion of the rent was in turn paid to the imperial government as taxes. The zamindars were the principal revenue collectors for the imperial administration under Mughal and British rule. The system was abolished by 1951.

The British entrenched the precolonial zamindari system through the Permanent Settlement. The zamindars dominated most of the villages in Bengal by collecting rent from tenant cultivators. The zamindari system mirrored the European system of serfdom. Bengali zamindars were often recognised with titles like Maharaja, Nawab, and Khan Bahadur, but they never ruled over princely states. With Bengal being the most populous and politically influential province in British India, Bengali zamindars were the most politically influential landed gentry in British India.

== Etymology ==
Grandeur of Durga Puja in Nabakrishna Deb's palace in 18th century Calcutta

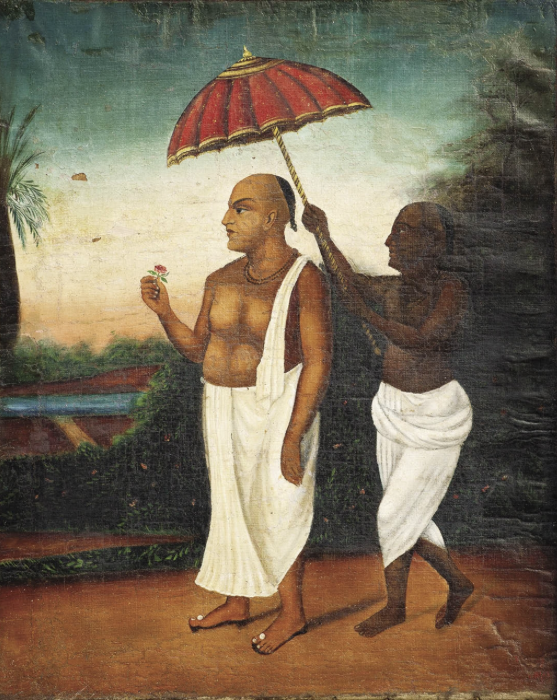
Maharaja Nabakrishna Deb of Sovabazar Raj

According to Encyclopedia Britannica, "zamindar, in India, a holder or occupier (dār) of land (zamīn). The root words are Persian, and the resulting name was widely used wherever Persian influence was spread by the Mughals or other Indian Muslim dynasties. The meanings attached to it were various. In Bengal the word denoted a hereditary tax collector who could retain 10 percent of the revenue he collected. In the late 18th century, the British government made these zamindars landowners, thus creating a landed aristocracy in Bengal and Bihar that lasted until Indian independence (1947). In parts of north India (e.g., Uttar Pradesh), a zamindar denoted a large landowner with full proprietary rights. More generally in north India, zamindar denoted the cultivator of the soil or joint proprietors holding village lands in common as joint heirs. In Maratha territories, the name was generally applied to all local hereditary revenue officers".

== History ==
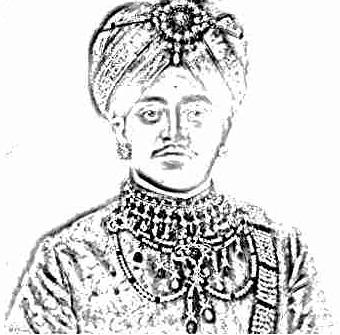
A sketch of the 15th-century zamindar Raja Ganesha

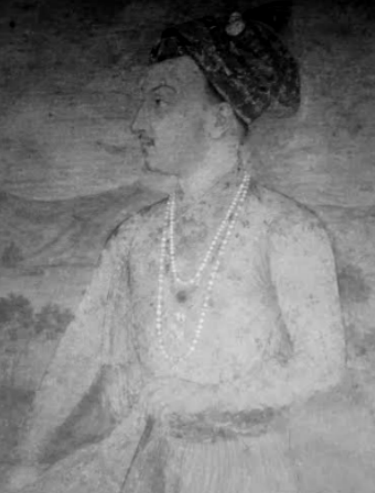
Virendra Mohan Dar the Zamindar of Dar, Nannar and Dhamrai

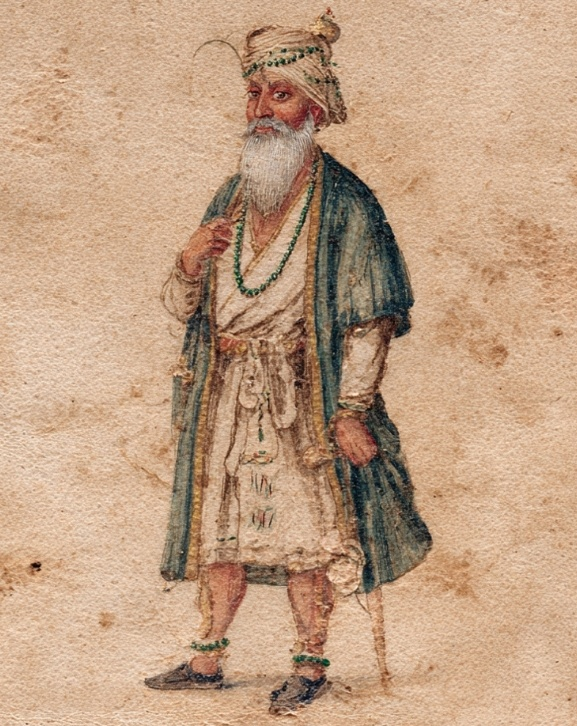
Manik Ram Basu, the first Maharaja of Manikganj and Hatkhola

During the 14th century, the Hindu zamindar Raja Ganesha overthrew the Ilyas Shahi dynasty and placed his son on the throne. In Richard Eaton's The Rise of Islam and the Bengal Frontier, there is mention of Khan Jahan Ali as the zamindar of Bagerhat. According to records collected in 1870, Khan Jahan Ali settled in the area "to reclaim and cultivate the lands in the Sundarbans, which were at that time waste and covered with forest. He obtained from the emperor, or from the king of Gaur, a jaghir [revenue assignment] of these lands, and in accordance with it established himself on them. The tradition of his cutcherry site [court] in both places corresponds with this view of his position, and the fact of his undertaking such large works—works which involve the necessity of supporting quite an army of laborers—also points to his position as receiver of the rents, or chief of the cultivation of the soil....After he had lived a long time as a great zamindar, he withdrew himself from worldly affairs and dwelt as a faqir".

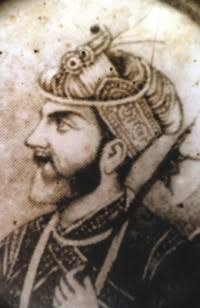
The 16th-century zamindar Isa Khan

Between the late 16th and early 17th centuries, a confederation of twelve zamindar families existed in the Bhati region of eastern Bengal. They included twelve Muslim and Hindu zamindar families. They were led by Isa Khan, a former prime minister of the Bengal Sultanate. When the sultanate disintegrated due to Mughal invasions, these twelve families retained control of eastern Bengal. They resisted Mughal expansion until the early 17th century. Ralph Fitch, an English traveler to Bengal in 1580, wrote about the twelve zamindars. According to Fitch, "for here are so many Rivers and Lands, that they (Mughals) flee from one to another, whereby his Akbar the Great horsemen cannot prevail against them. Great store of cotton cloth is made here. Sinnergan (Sonargaon) is a towne sixe leagues from Serrepore, where there is the best and finest cloth made of cotton that is in all India. The chief king of all these countries is called Isacan (Isa Khan), and he is chief of all the other kings, and is a great friend to all Christians". In Bengal, for the year(s) 1880/1881, there were 150,420 estates, of which 140,007 were permanently settled, 7,670 were temporarily settled, 2,720 were under the government, and 23 were ryotwari tracts. The land tax on all these was 37,541,188 rupees, with arrears being nearly 4 million pounds sterling. Of the above 150,420 estates, some 500 had an area of 20,000 acres (31.25 qq. miles or 80.93 km2), and upwards of 15,000 with from 500 to 20,000 acres. The rest, or about 89 per cent, were under 500 acres each.

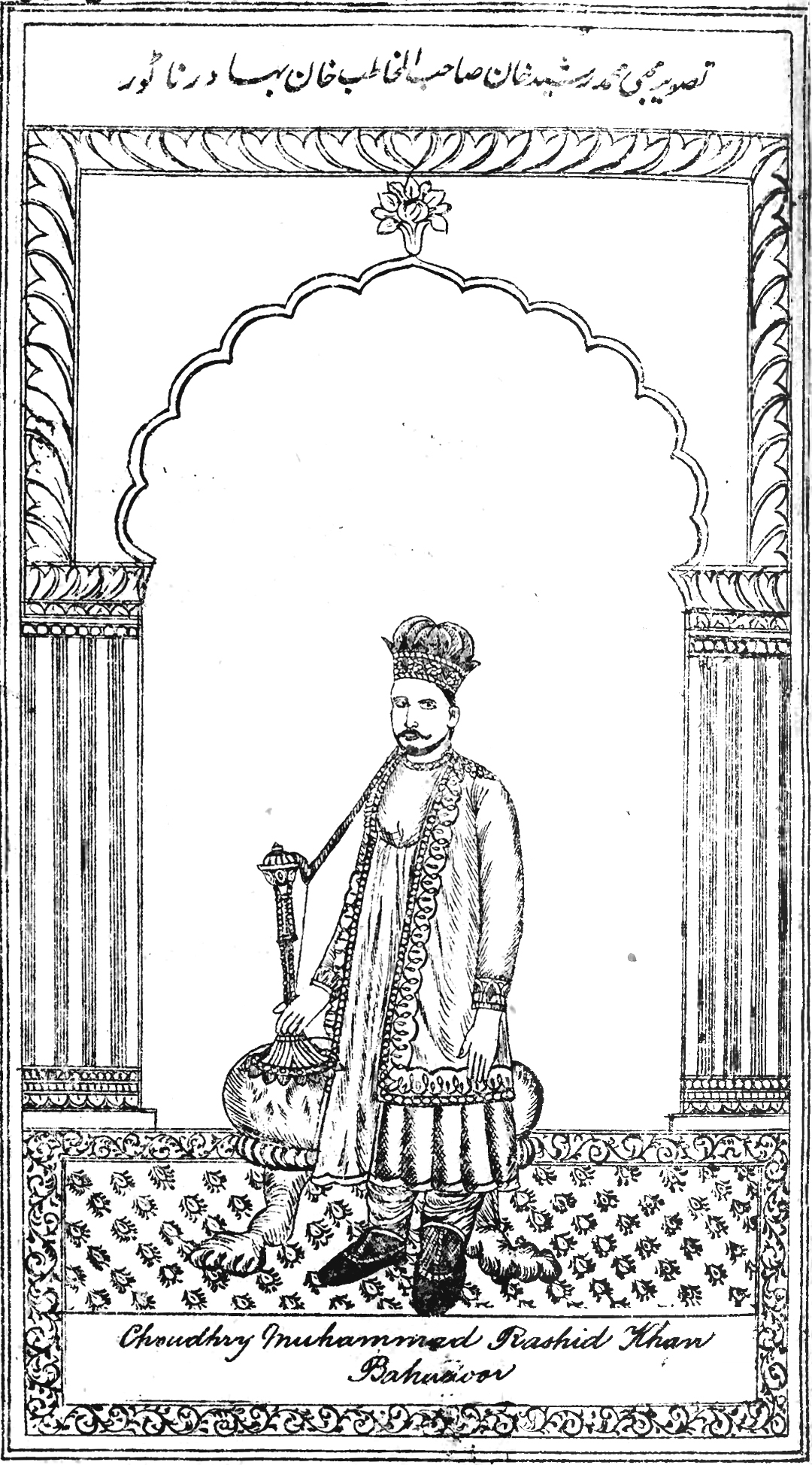
Illustration of Rashid Ali Khan Chowdhury, one of the Chowdhuries of Natore, from Mauj-i-Sultani (1884).

In the words of a Jesuit mission in 1600, "Twelve princes, however, called Boyones [bhūyān] who governed twelve provinces in the late King's name, escaped from this massacre. These united against the Mongols [sic], and hitherto, thanks to their alliance, each maintains himself in his dominions. Very rich and disposing of strong forces, they bear themselves as Kings, chiefly he of Sripur, also called Cadaray or Kedar Ray, and he of Chandecan, Pratapaditya of Jessore, but most of all the Mansondolin ["Masnad-i 'ālī," title of Isa Khan]. The Pathane s [Afghans], being scattered above, are subject to the Boyones". The capital of the confederation was Sonargaon.

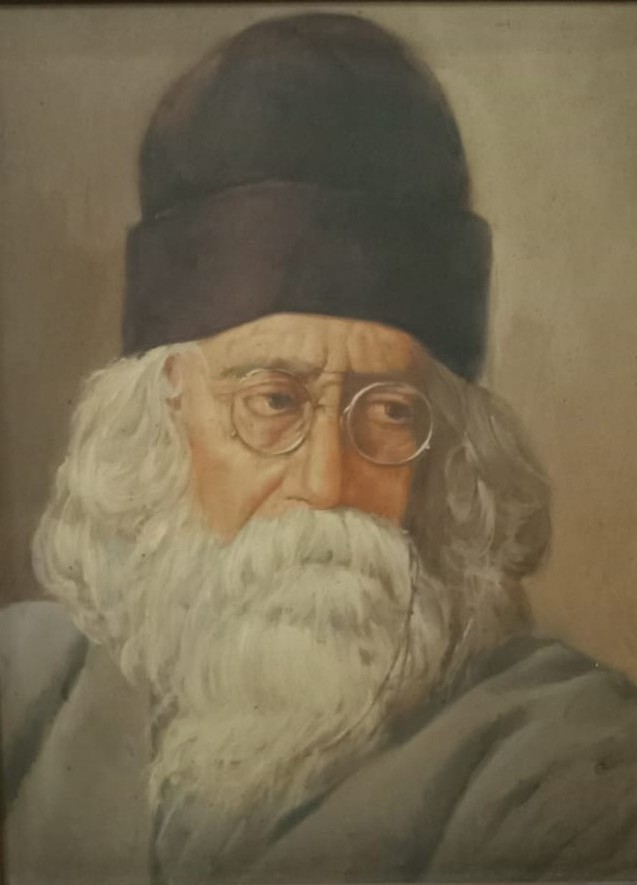
Rabindranath Tagore from the influential Tagore family

Emperor Akbar's Land Regulation System of 1582 could not be implemented in Bengal. Instead, the Mughals relied on zamindars to consolidate the expansion of farmland, religion, and administration. Zamindars were responsible for collecting taxes. The zamindars also had policing, judicial, and administrative functions. The zamindars were integral to Mughal government in Bengal. They were also known as jagirdars.

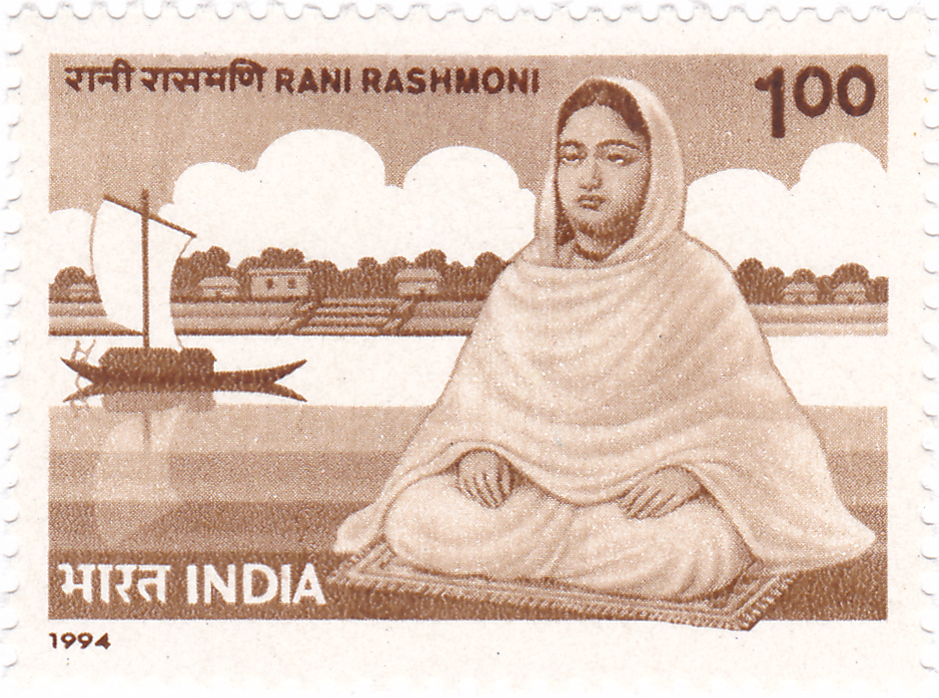
Rani Rashmoni, a leading zamindar of Bengal, on a postal stamp by the Government of India

The Naib Nazims were the chief zamindars of Dhaka under the Nawabs of Bengal. They were heavily influenced by English culture, spoke fluent English and collected Western art. The 19th-century office holder Nusrat Jung was described as an anglophile. Dhaka's status as a major commercial center of Mughal India made the Naib Nazim highly wealthy and influential. The Naib Nazims initially resided in Islam Khan's Fort, then the Bara Katra, and finally at Nimtali Kuthi. Under Company rule in India, the Cornwallis Code introduced the Permanent Settlement. Zamindars were made responsible for collecting taxes on behalf of the colonial government. The zamindari system became further entrenched under British rule. In 1950, the East Bengal Legislative Assembly enacted the East Bengal State Acquisition and Tenancy Act of 1950, which abolished the zamindari system as part of land reforms. In West Bengal, the zamindari system was abolished under federal laws enacted by the Indian government in 1951.

== Duties ==
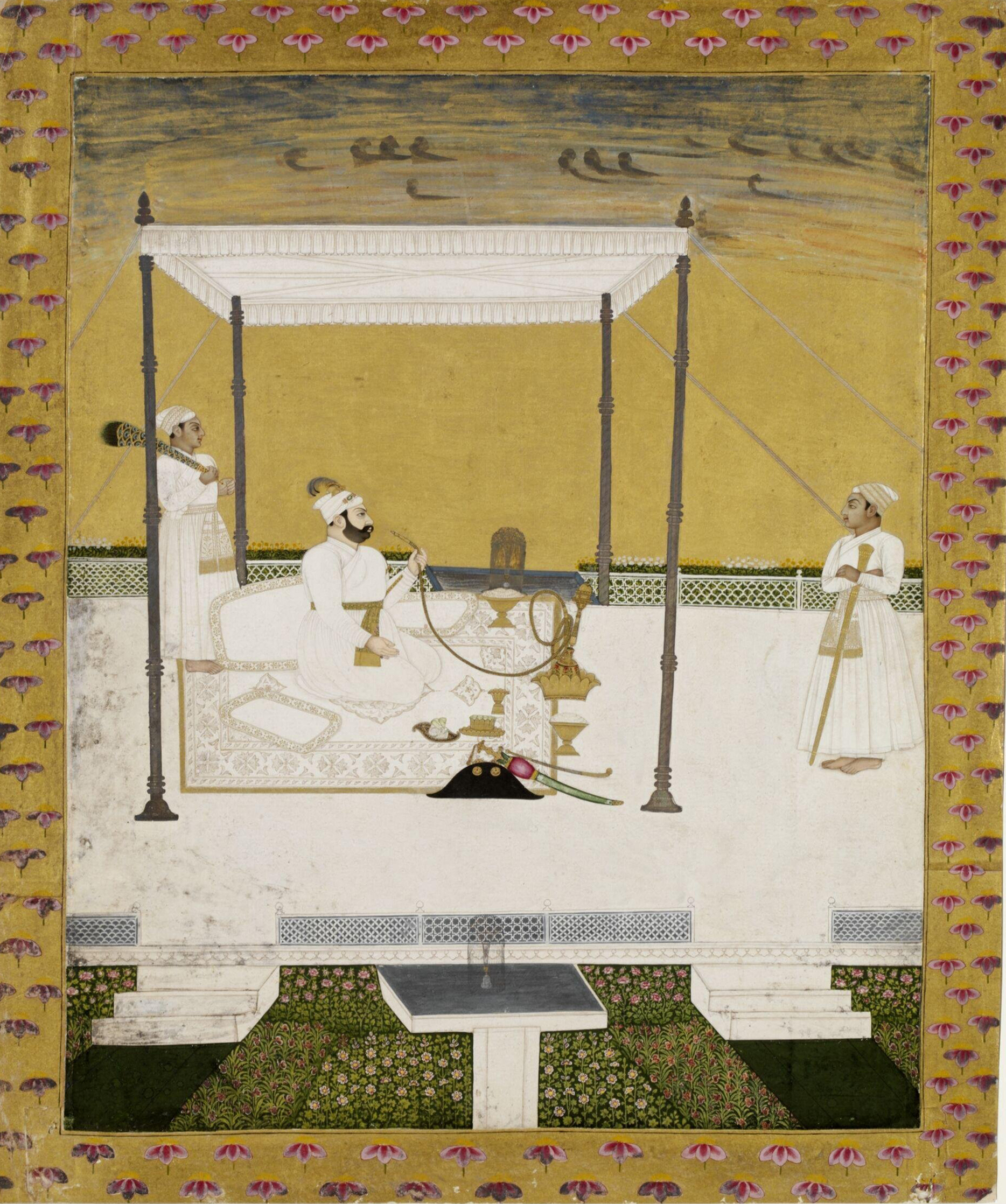
Husain Quli Khan, Naib Nazim of Dhaka, smoking a hookah, which was common among zamindars

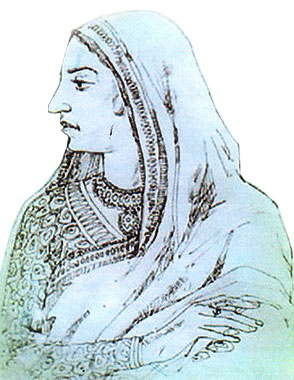
Faizunnesa Chowdhurani

According to Banglapedia, "All categories of zamindars under the Mughals were required to perform certain police, judicial and military duties. With elements of both fiscal and political power at their disposal, zamindars exercised enormous local influence that made them the most undisputed potentates within the bounds of their territories. However, a full-fledged police system did not develop in rural Bengal during the period and hence some revenue staff were simultaneously entrusted with police duties. For instance, the gram-saranjami paiks who were employed primarily to assist zamindars in the collection of rents and guard the crops on the fields, were also made responsible for apprehension of thieves and robbers and preservation of peace, law and order in public places such as haats (fairs) and bazaars, and fairgrounds. The regular police forces of big zamindars were organised and controlled within a system of thanas which were the largest police units, and under these came the smaller posts known as chaukies or pharies. In the heyday of the Mughals, the faujdar retained supreme authority over the thanas, nominally placed under the zamindari control. In nawabi Bengal (under the Nawabs of Bengal), the thanas gradually fell under the control of the monopolistic zamindari estates. Territorial zamindars had judicial powers. The encyclopedia further states that "Since the Mughals did not maintain a large standing army, they had to depend heavily on the indirect recruits of soldiers drafted from the territorial chiefs, clan or caste leaders.

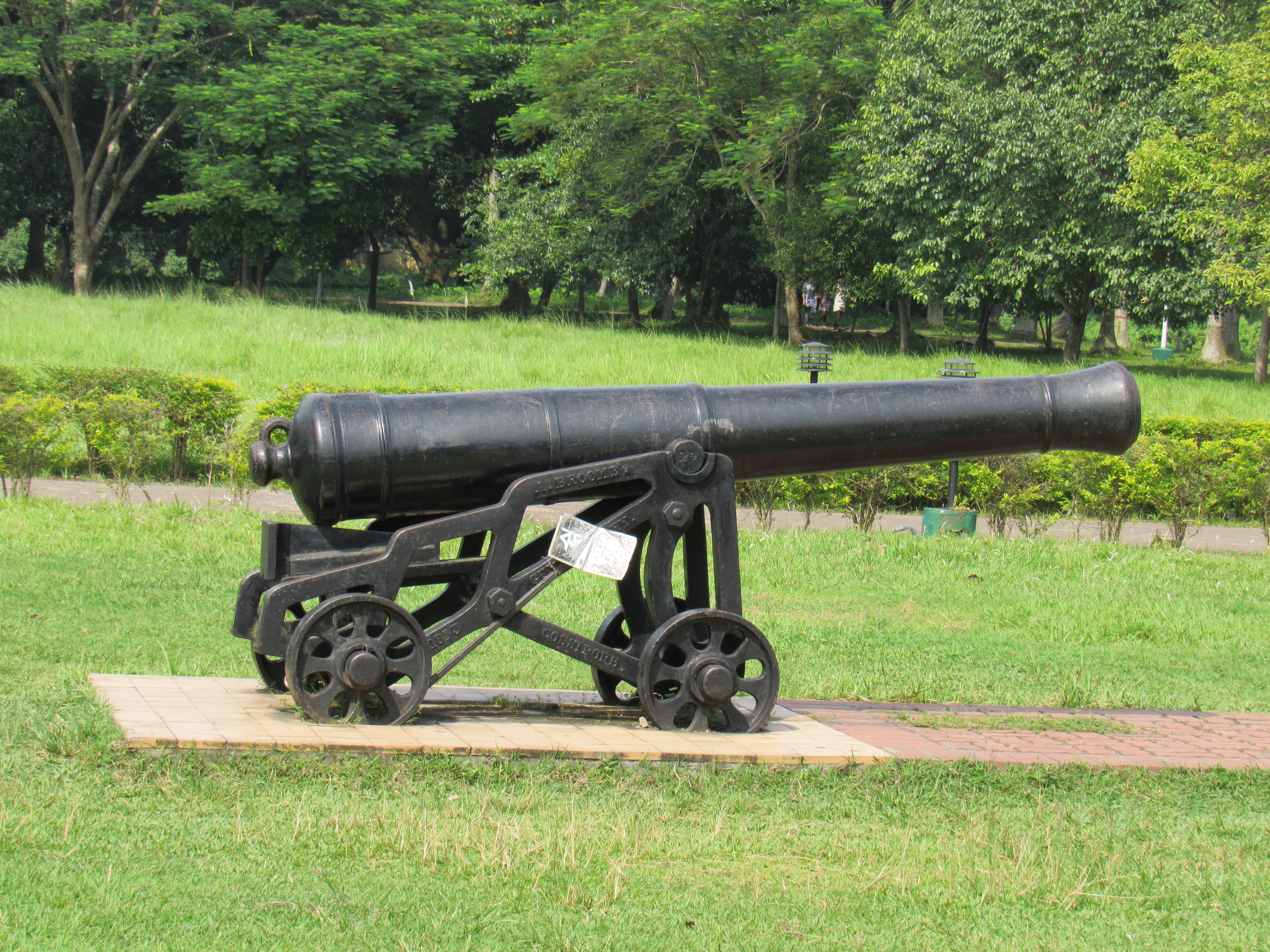
A cannon belonging to the Dighapatia Raj

Some zamindars were even enrolled personally into the imperial service as mansabdars (nobles, holding military titles or ranks) and were remunerated in grants of jagirs, proportionate to their status. Moreover, torrential monsoon rain in the flat and riverine Bengal rendered the cavalry and artillery almost useless except in the dry season. In such a situation, to fight against the rebellious chiefs, the Magh and Feringi pirates who had been intermittently raiding the southern and eastern frontiers of Bengal, the Mughals had to depend greatly on the military assistance of the zamindars who were obliged to provide the troops with victuals and other daily necessaries and to cut off supplies to the enemies of the government. The great territorial zamindars were empowered to keep armed establishments and construct forts with a view to defending their territories, protecting agriculture, trade and commerce, ensuring the safe despatch of the revenues and keeping the raiyats under control. But the erosion of the imperial authority and the subsequent unsettled condition of the subah considerably weakened the Nawab's hold on the landed gentry, who changed their loyalties as the tide of conflicts between the Nawab and the Marathas or the nawab and the English East India Company flowed and ebbed". Under British rule, members of zamindar families often served in the Bengal Civil Service, the Bengal Judicial Service, and the Bengal Army.

== Change in composition ==
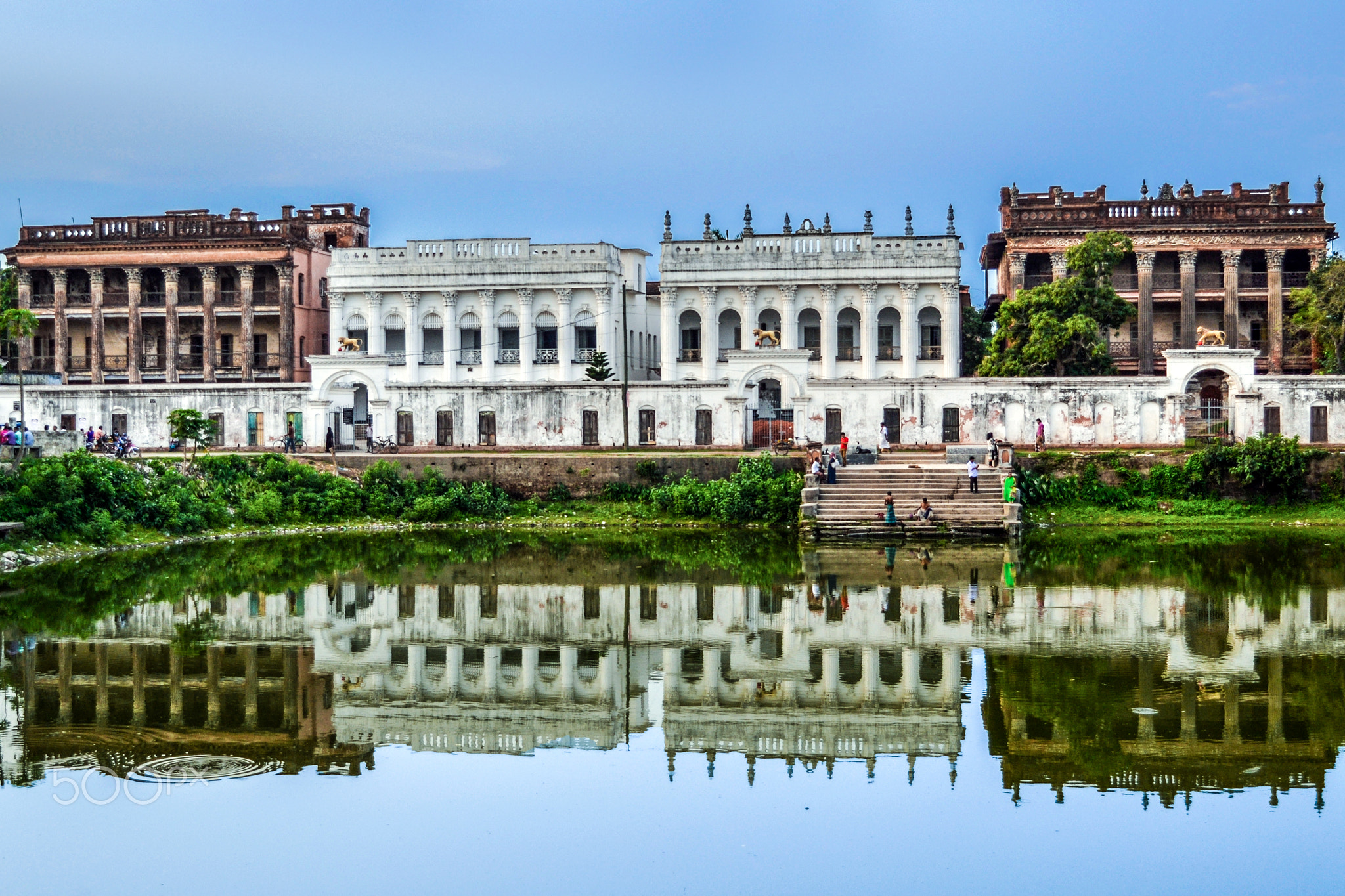
Zamindar houses of Baliati

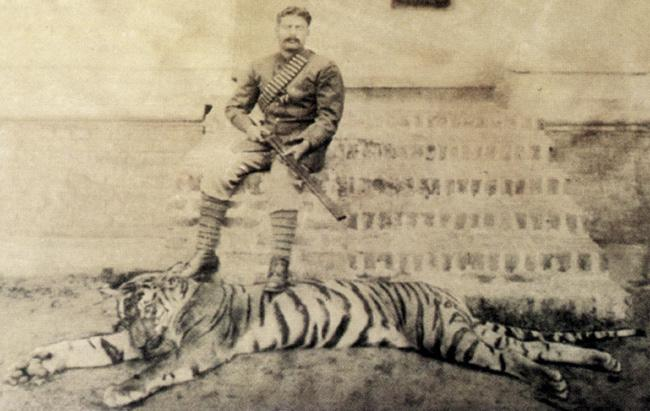
Ramendra Narayan Roy of the Bhawal Estate after hunting a Royal Bengal Tiger. The Bhawal case was argued before the Privy Council. Hunting was a favorite pastime of the zamindars.

According to the Ain-i-Akbari, the zamindars of Bengal Subah were mostly from the Kayastha caste. The British displaced the wealthy, landed and aristocratic elites of Bengal, including both Muslims and Hindus who were loyal to the Mughals and Nawabs. Precolonial Bengal was home to a wealthy landed gentry and merchant families like the Jagat Seth. According to the Indian politician Shashi Tharoor, the British adopted a policy of divide et impera which played Hindus and Muslims against each other. In Bengal, this policy promoted new Hindu estates and zamindars, at the expense of the Muslim peasantry and landed gentry. A wealthy upper caste Hindu zamindar community thrived. Although, most of the estates belonged to the three traditional uppercastes of Bengal, the intermediate castes like the Mahishyas and the Sadgops and some others also, had significant land holdings. Hindus were given jobs in the colonial government, initially as clerks, and later as judges, magistrates, and junior bureaucrats. Muslims also fell behind by shunning access to Western education which was documented by Nawab Abdul Latif. Raja Ram Mohun Roy sowed the seeds of a Hindu-led Bengal Renaissance. The power of the Hindu landed gentry caused deep resentment among the Bengali Muslim masses. The influence of the Hindu zamindars provoked peasant uprisings, including the rebellion of Titumir and the Faraizi movement led by Haji Shariatullah. The dynamic between Hindu zamindars (landlords) and Muslim peasants in historical Bengal is one of the region's defining socio-economic fault lines. Rooted in the 1793 British Permanent Settlement, this structure placed high-caste Hindu landlords over a predominantly Muslim peasantry in East Bengal. This economic exploitation often took on communal overtones, fueling major agrarian uprisings. Between 1937 and 1943, a coalition government of the secular Krishak Praja Party and the Hindu Mahasabha headed by Prime Minister of Bengal A. K. Fazlul Huq enacted several reforms, including the Bengal Agricultural Debtors' Act (1938), the Money Lenders' Act (1938) and the Bengal Tenancy (Amendment) Act (1938). Debt Settlement Boards were created in all districts. The Tebhaga movement was a peasant uprising supported by the Communist Party of India against the Muslim League government of Prime Minister Huseyn Shaheed Suhrawardy, which resulted in legal reforms for sharecropping.

== Politics ==
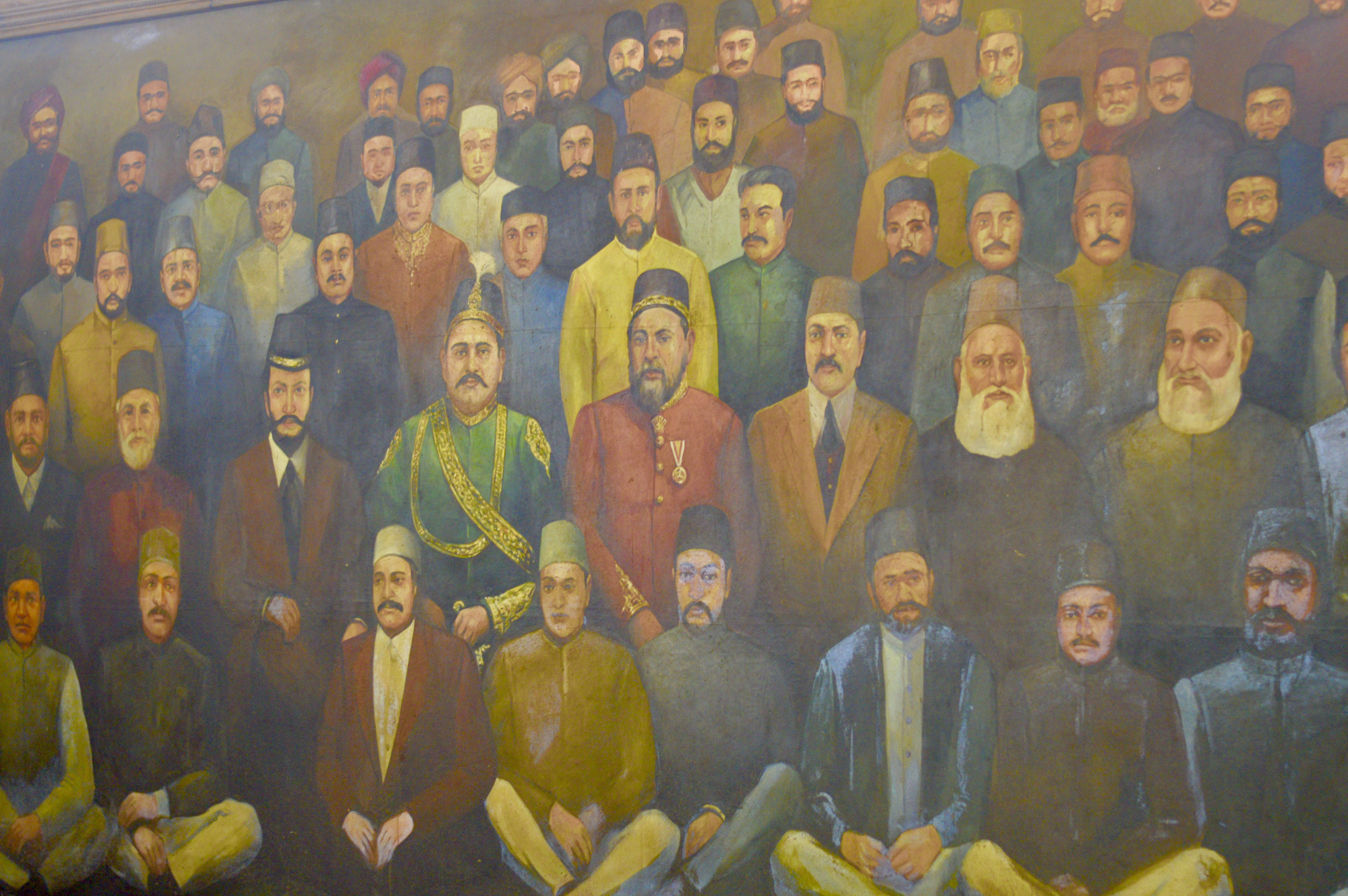
Many of Bengal's Muslim zamindars led by the Nawab of Dhaka played a key role in establishing the All India Muslim League in Dhaka in 1906

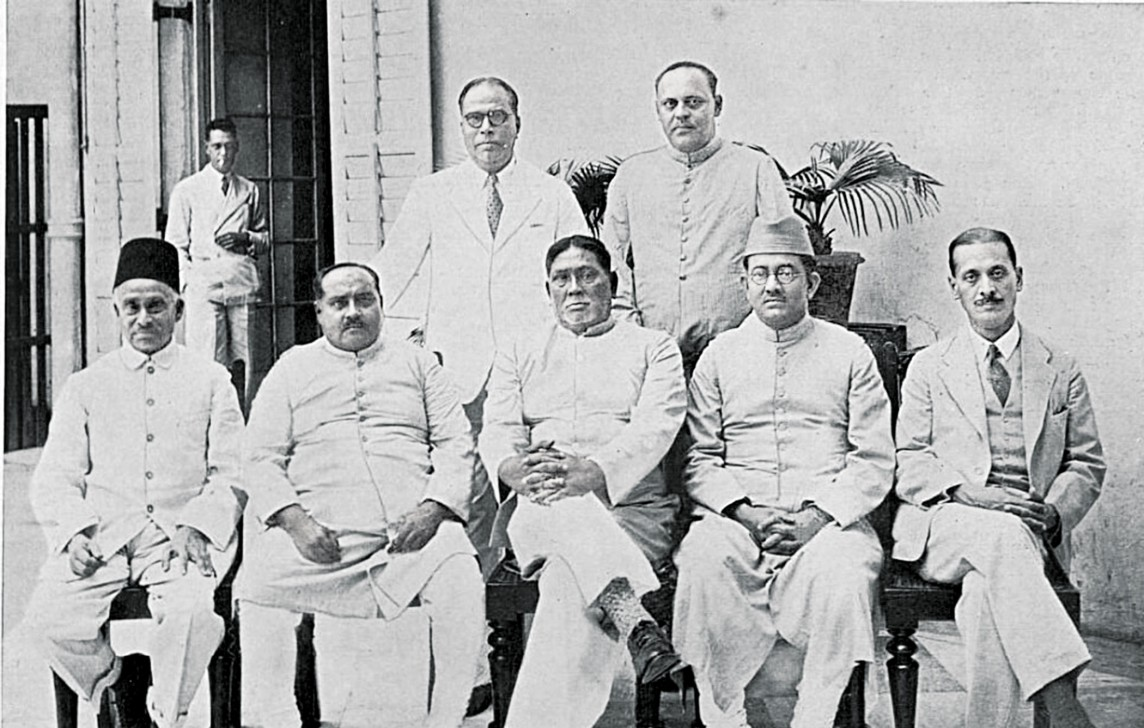
The first elected cabinet of Bengal in 1937 included many zamindars

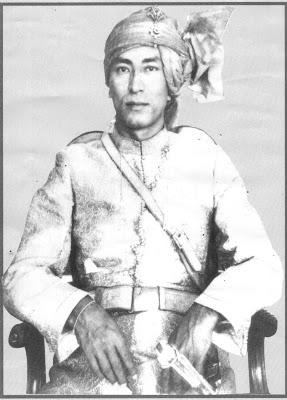
Raja Tridiv Roy from the Chittagong Hill Tracts

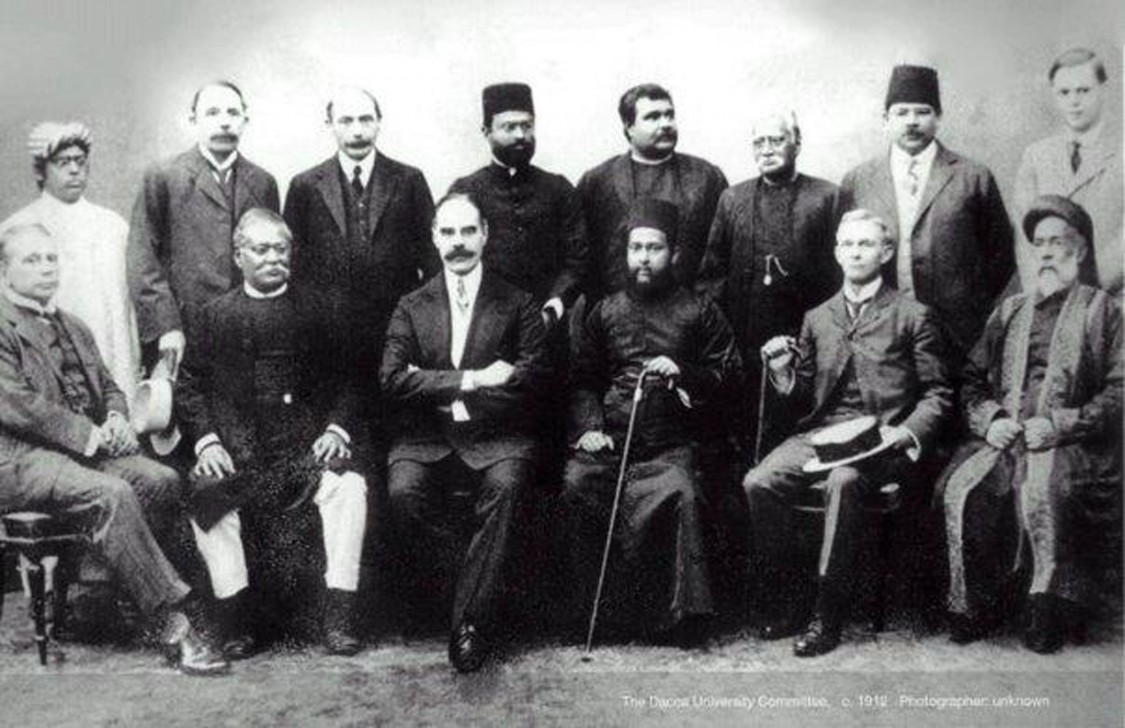
Zamindars were part of the Nathan Committee, which founded the University of Dhaka in 1921

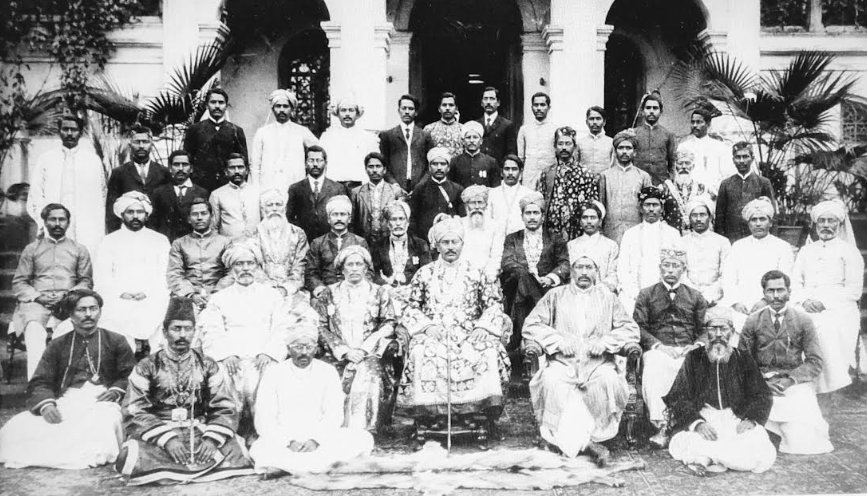
Zamindars of Dar Raj, Dacca (c. 1879) in front of the Dhar Zamindar Palace, Nannar, Dacca.

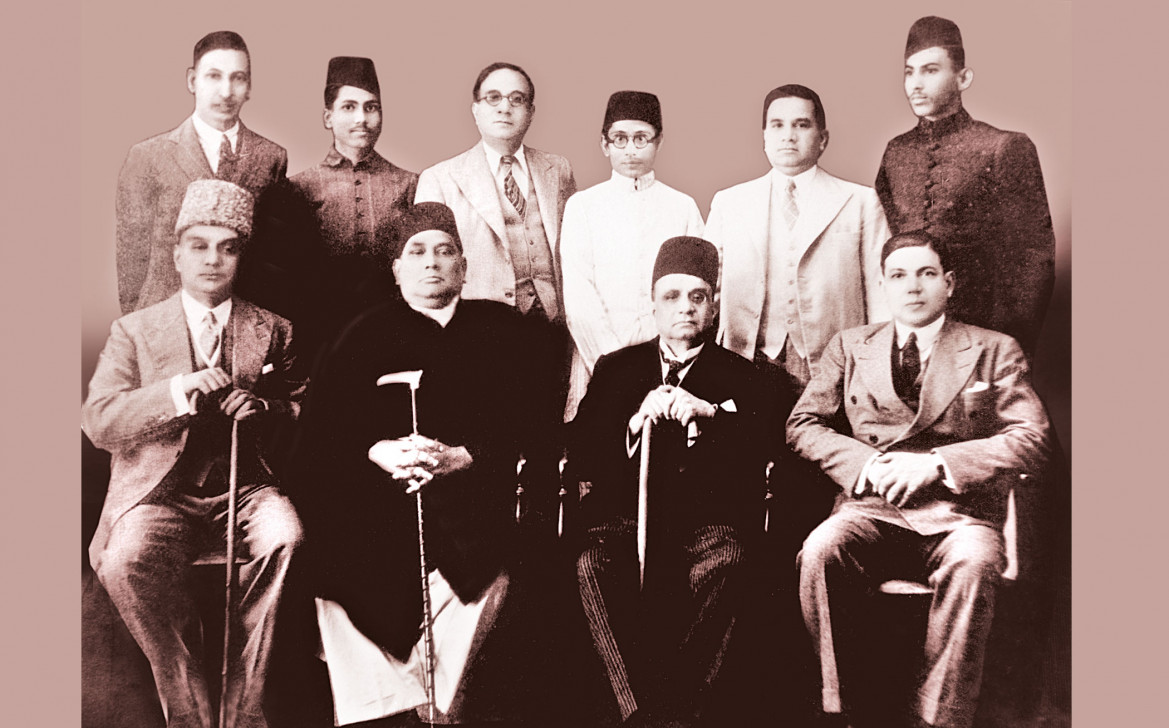
Urdu-speaking and Bengali-speaking Muslim aristocrats of Bengal gathered together for a picture, including members of the Suhrawardy family, Syed Hossain, and A. K. Fazlul Huq. Some are wearing a Fez cap in line with Ottoman fashion.

The zamindars of Bengal were involved in the creation and leadership of the Indian National Congress and All India Muslim League. Many zamindar families produced leading politicians and members of the Bengal Legislative Council and Bengal Legislative Assembly. Opposition to Bengali Hindu zamindars was a major factor in the rise of the Bengal Provincial Muslim League and the All Bengal Tenants Association. Debt relief for tenants was pursued by the government of Prime Minister A. K. Fazlul Huq. Huq's first cabinet in 1937 included several Bengali zamindars, including Maharaja Srish Chandra Nandy, Sir Khwaja Nazimuddin, Nawab Khwaja Habibullah, and Nawab Musharraf Hussain.

The Moyez Manzil of the Amirabad Estate, Faridpur hosted gatherings of the All India Literary Conference, All India Motion Pictures Conference, Bengal Education Policy Conference, All India Nationalist Muslim Conference, All India Muslim League and All India Congress Committee. Yusuf Ali Chowdhury campaigned for Bengali Muslim civil rights. Despite being a zamindar himself, Chowdhury represented the grievances and aspirations of Muslim peasants, tenants, farmers and workers. His father Chowdhury Moyezuddin Biwshash, along with Ambica Charan Mazumdar, had founded the People's Association of Faridpur in 1881. Yusuf promoted the land redistribution policies of A. K. Fazlul Huq and the Krishak Praja Party, which resulted in sweeping land reforms.

== Cultural contributions ==
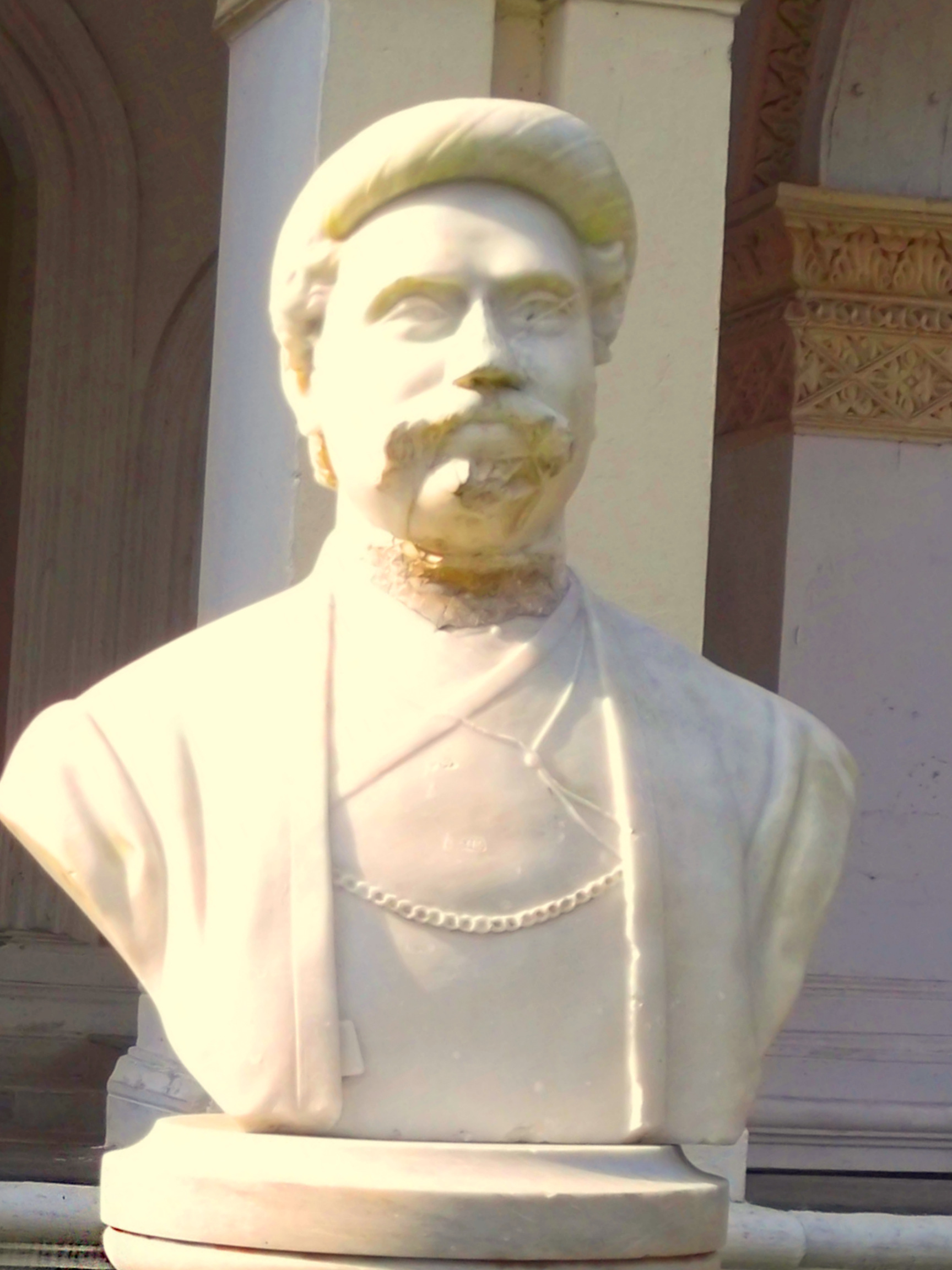
Bust of a Maharaja in Natore

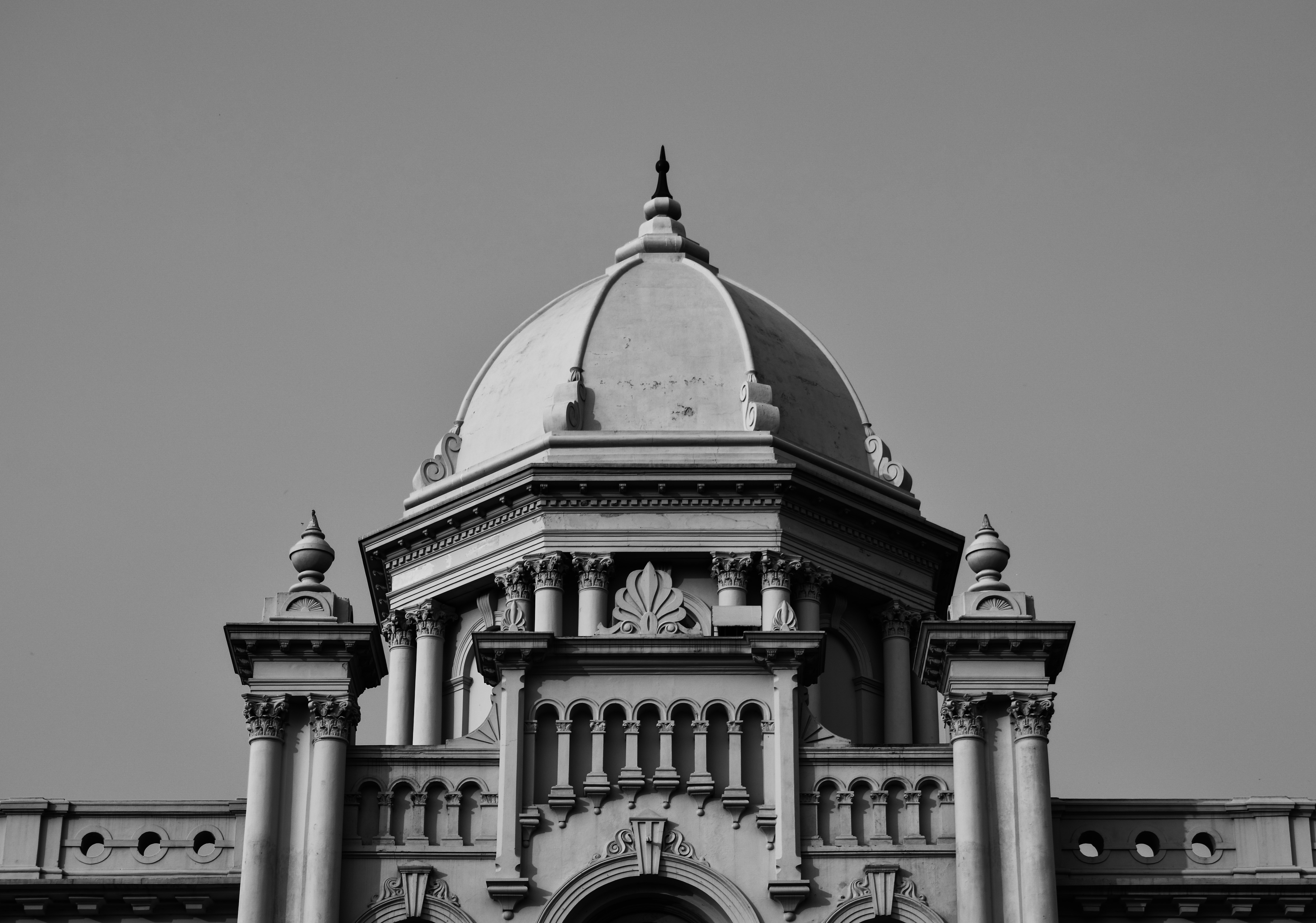
The Florentine-inspired dome of the palace of the Nawabs of Dhaka

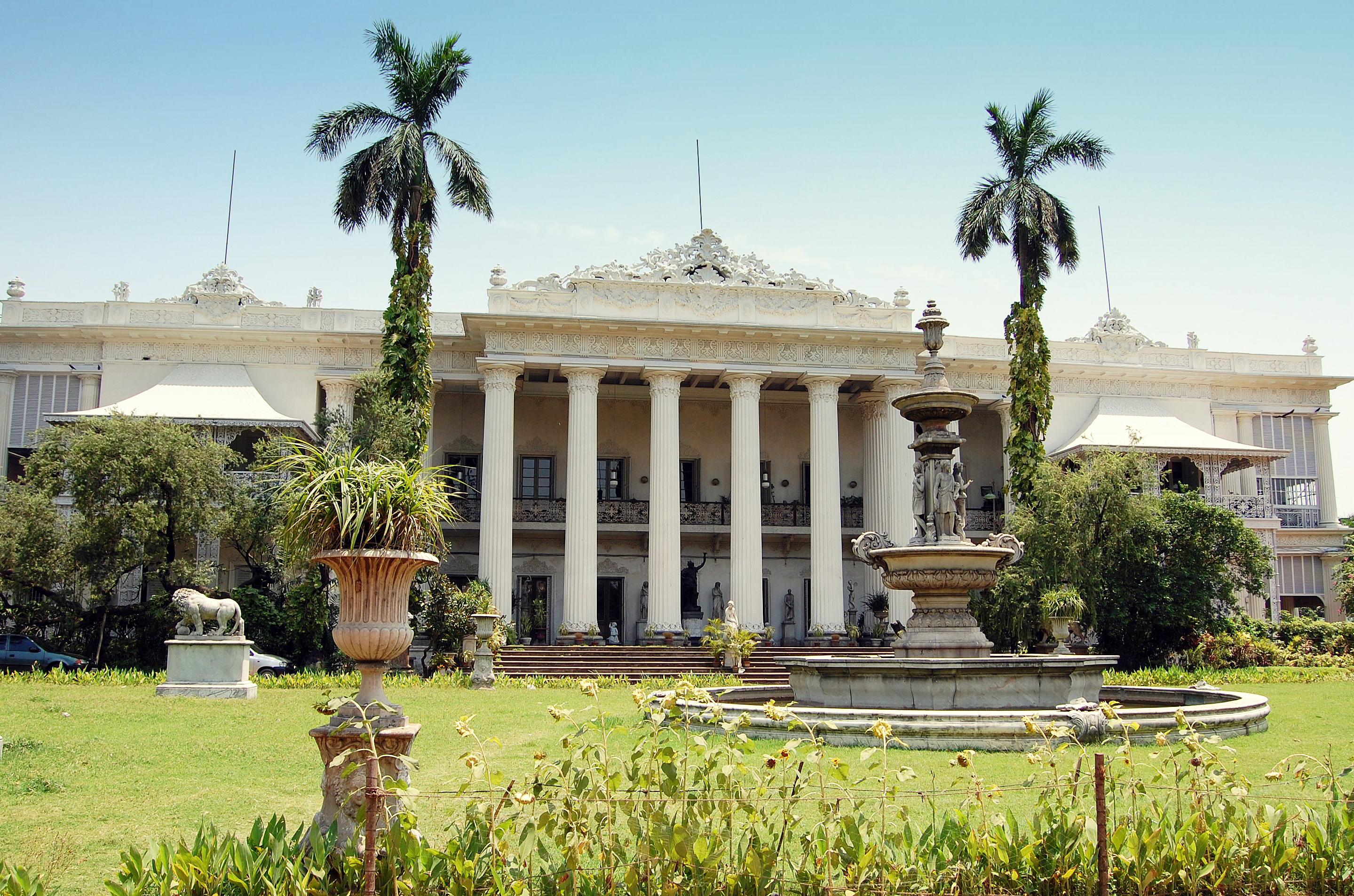
The Marble Palace of Calcutta belongs the Mullick zamindar family

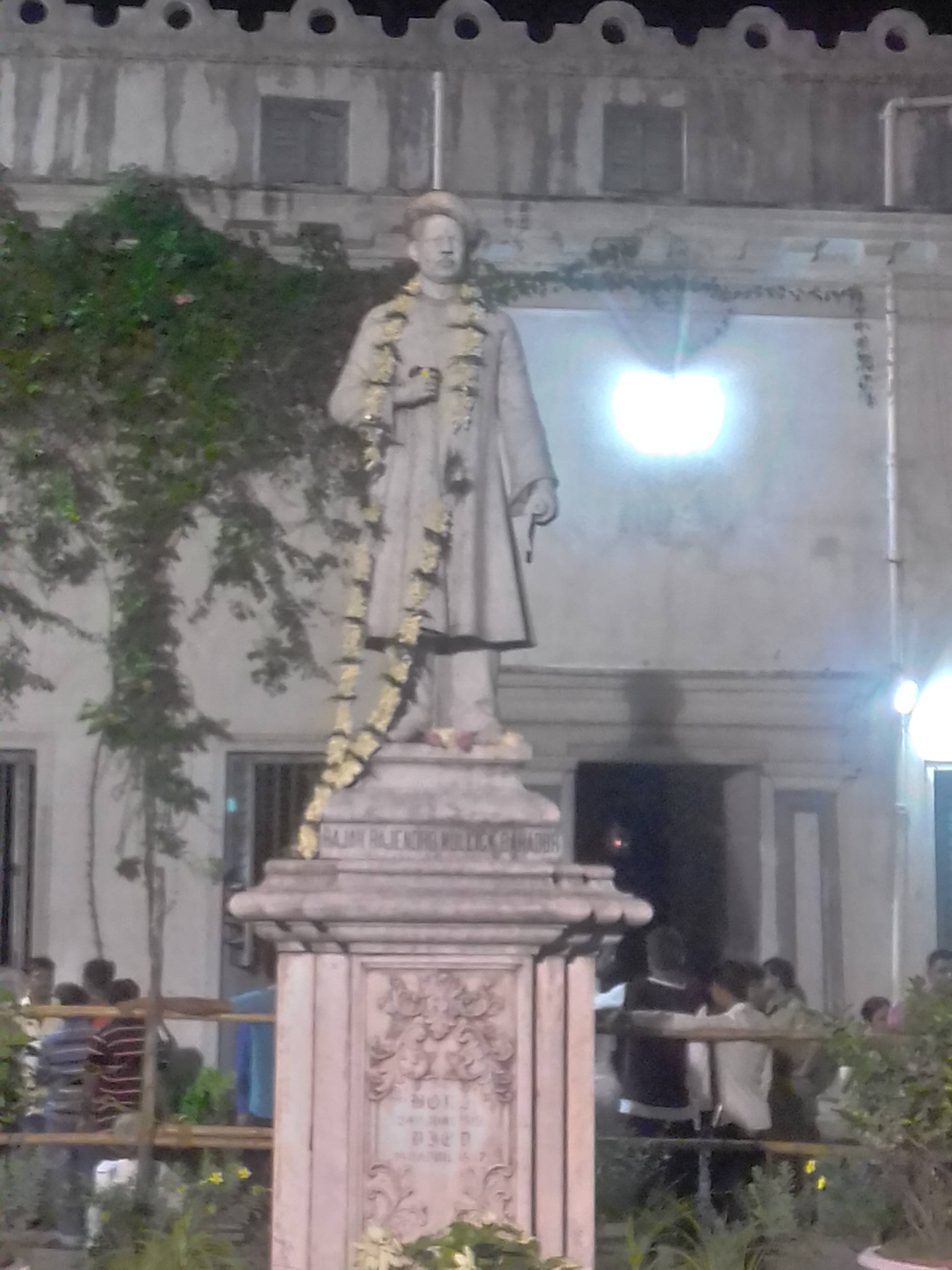
Rajendra Mullick, who built the Marble Palace (Kolkata)

Anukul Munshi of Chougachi Estate, a pioneer of the Mother-of-Pearl art in India

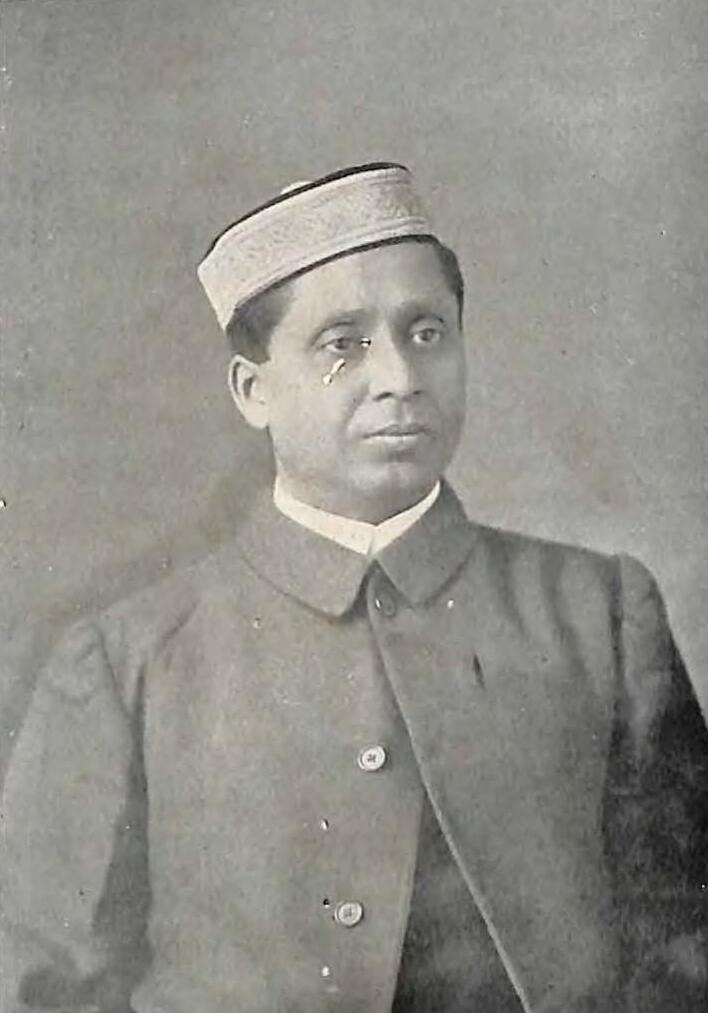
Sarat Kumar Ray of Dighapatia Raj and co-founder of Varendra Research Museum

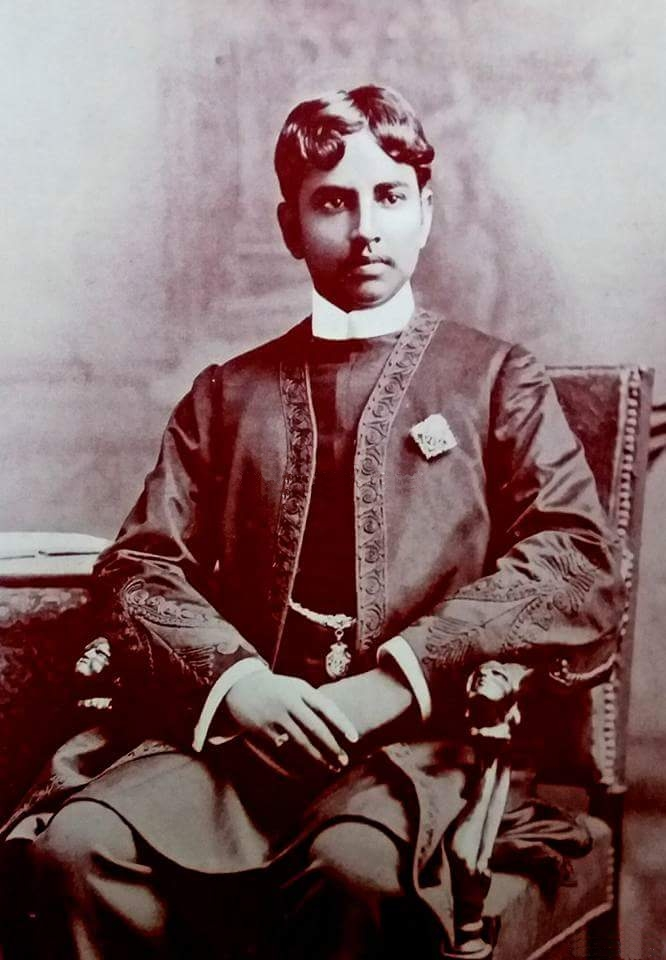
Manmatha Nath Roy Chowdhury of Santosh, Bangladesh, and former president of Indian Football Association

According to Banglapedia, "Zamindars developed a system of zamindari management of their own through their privileged hereditary position and built up their courts and a style of private life, vying with each other in pomp and grandeur. The landed aristocracy of the pre-British period included few absentee zamindars. Those who retained their official position as qanungos or chowdhuris were zamindars of the same locality. Consequently, the social life and public activities of the landed class were usually confined within the bound of their 'little kingdoms'. Their luxurious lifestyle boosted local crafts and small-scale industries like fine quality cotton textiles, exquisite silks, jewellery, decorative swords and weapons. Again, the extravagance of the prime zamindars in socio-religious festivities helped in no less degree the circulation of wealth in the society. Their darbars (courts) were modelled after the nawabs', and the Mughal dress, food, art and architecture were emulated which paved the way for a synthesis between the Turko-Persian and the indigenous cultures". The chieftains of the Chittagong Hill Tracts also engaged in elaborate ritual ceremonies.

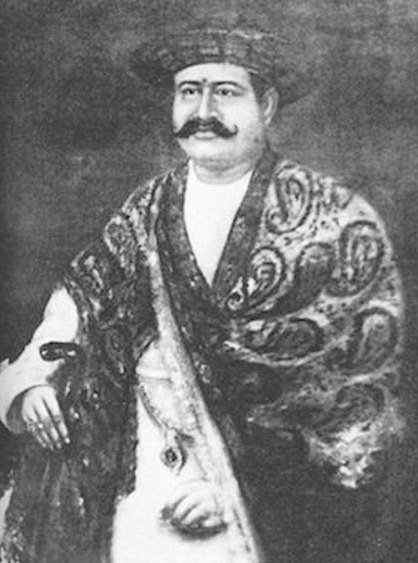
Portrait of Babu Mathur Mohan Biswas of the Janbazar Raj family

The zamindars of Bengal were great patrons of the arts. Many libraries were established by zamindars under British rule. The Great Bengal Library Association was formed in 1925. Zamindars established museums like the Varendra Research Museum and the Dacca Museum (which later became the Bangladesh National Museum). They set up numerous educational institutions like the Ahansullah School of Engineering. The Tagore family, the Janbazar Raj and Naldanga Zamindari Bari became pioneers of the Bengali Renaissance among the Hindu population. Writers like Mir Mosharraf Hossain, Begum Rokeya, Annada Munshi, and Michael Madhusudan Dutt were born and brought up on zamindar estates.

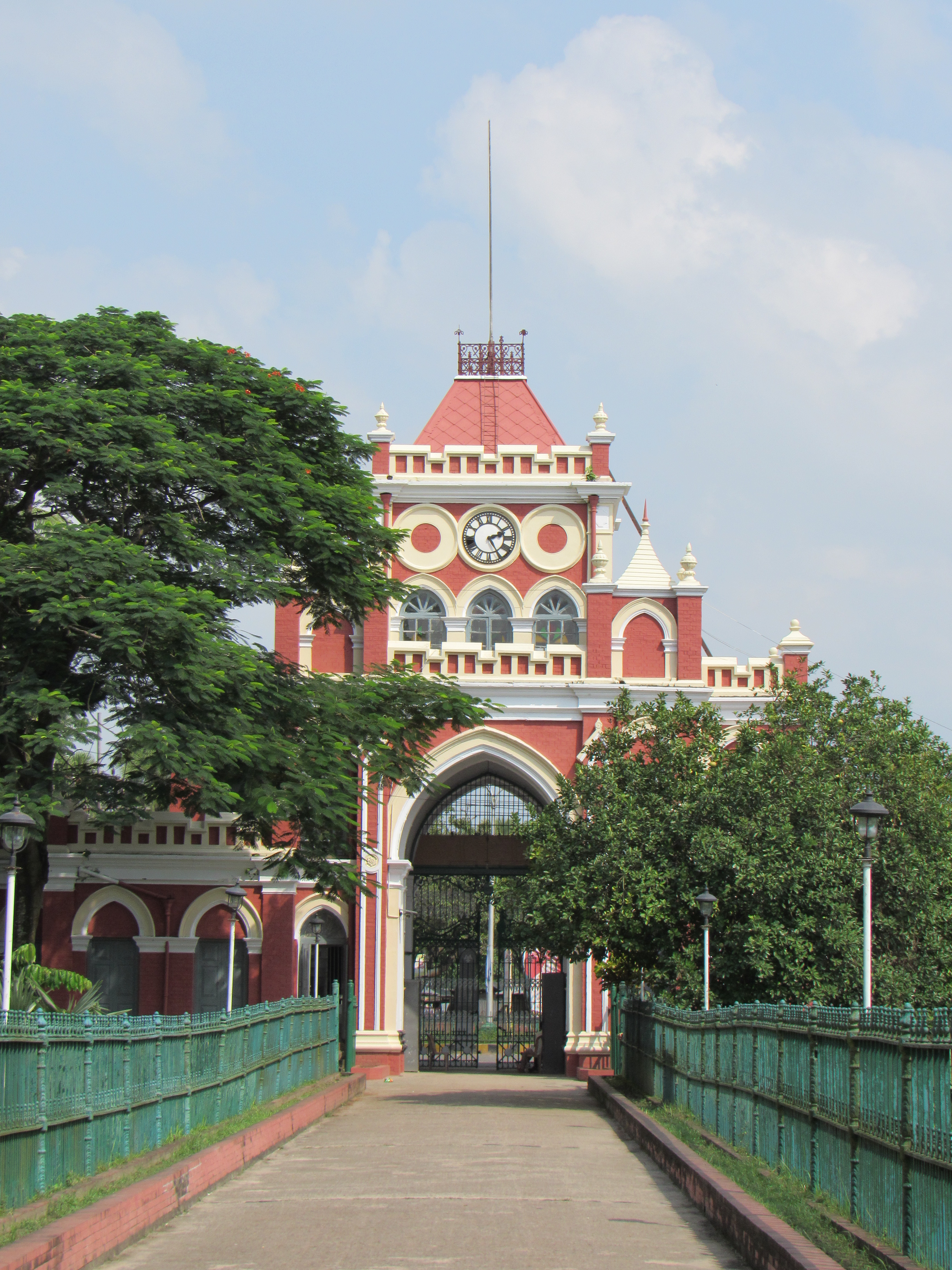
Clocktower at the entrance of Uttara Ganabhaban, the official residence of the Prime Minister of Bangladesh in North Bengal and formerly a palace of the Dighapatia Raj

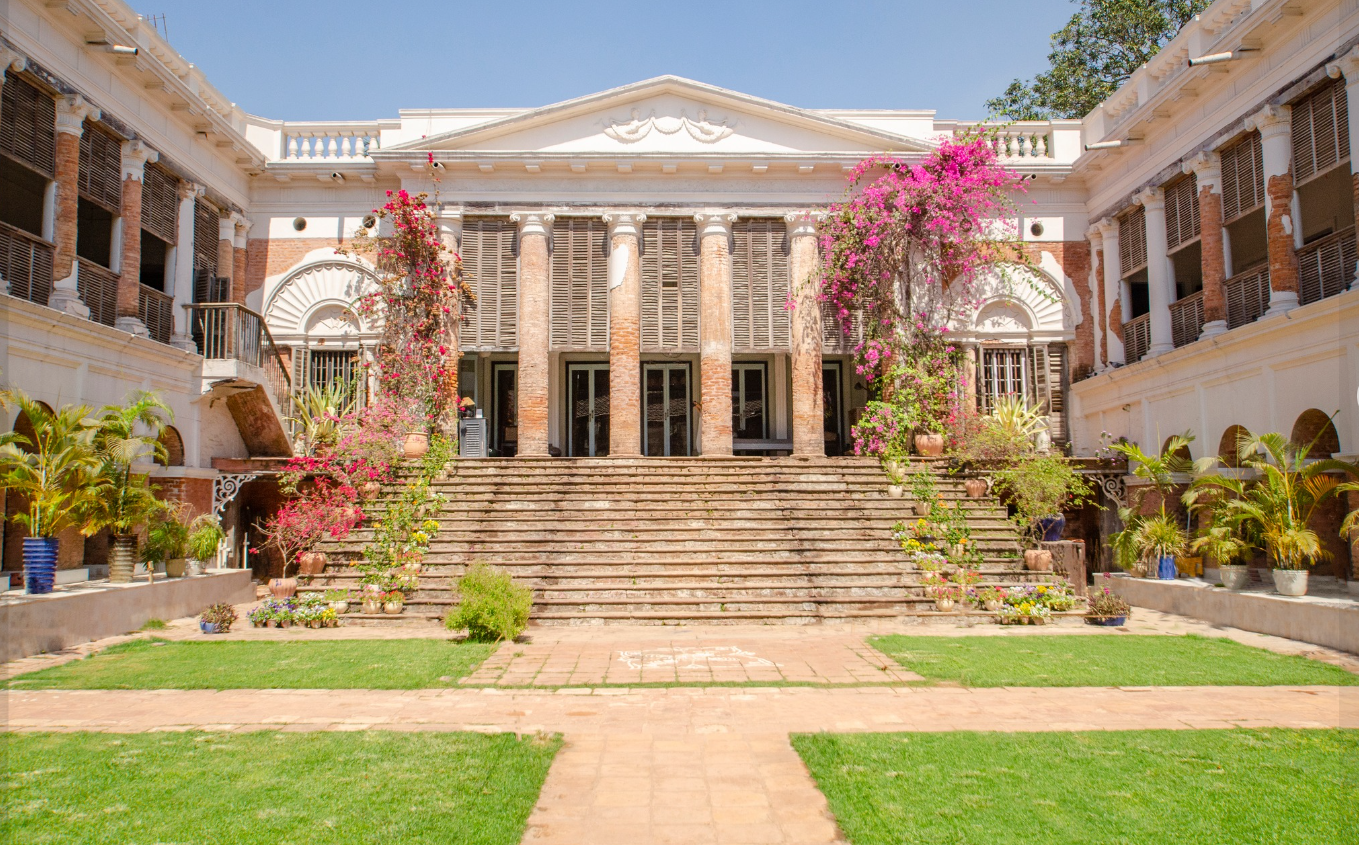
Mansion of the Bawali Raj, built in Indo-Saracenic style

The zamindars built their mansions in the Indo-Saracenic style.

== Wealth ==
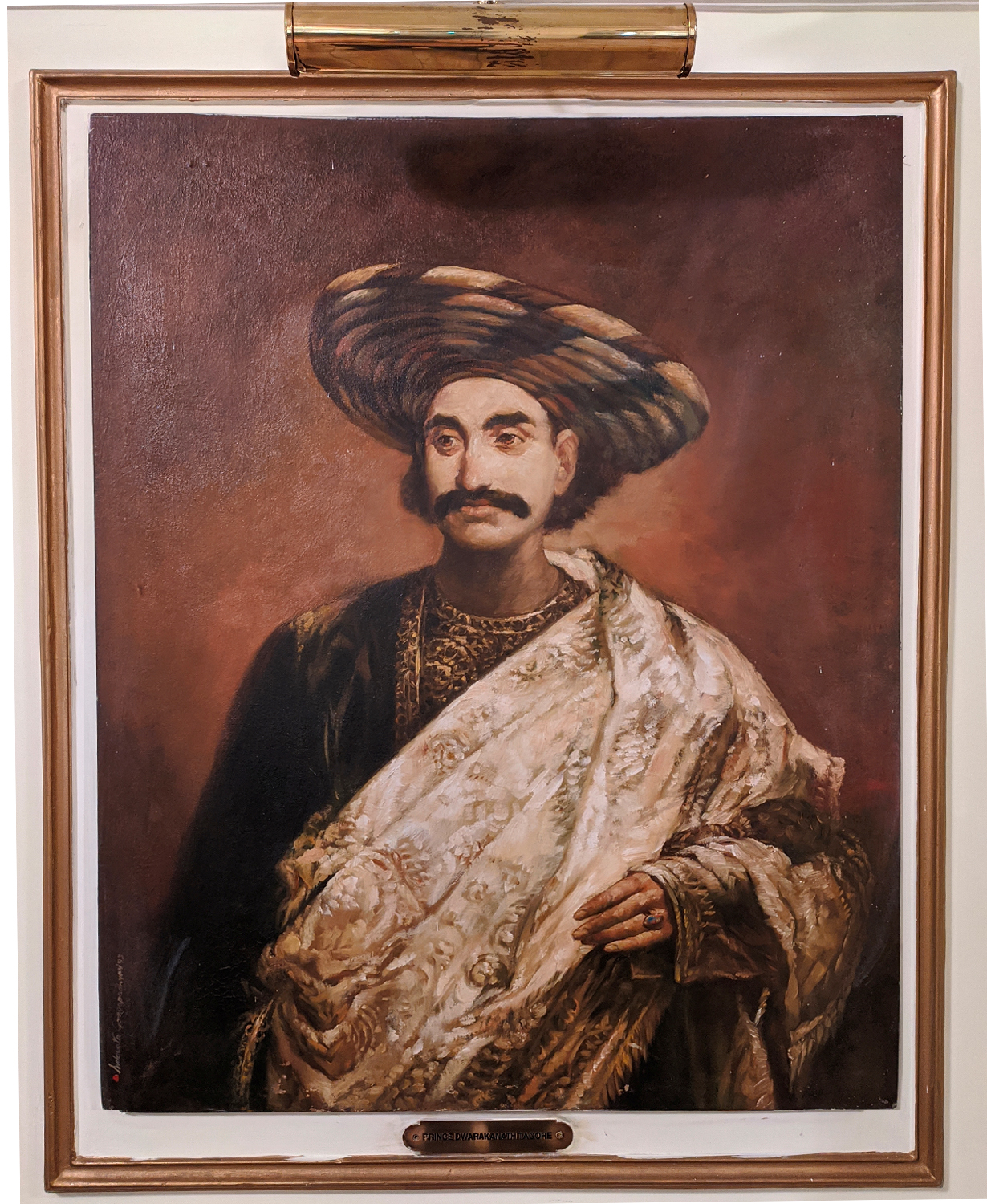
Portrait of Dwarakanath Tagore at The Bengal Club, one of the wealthiest Zamindars

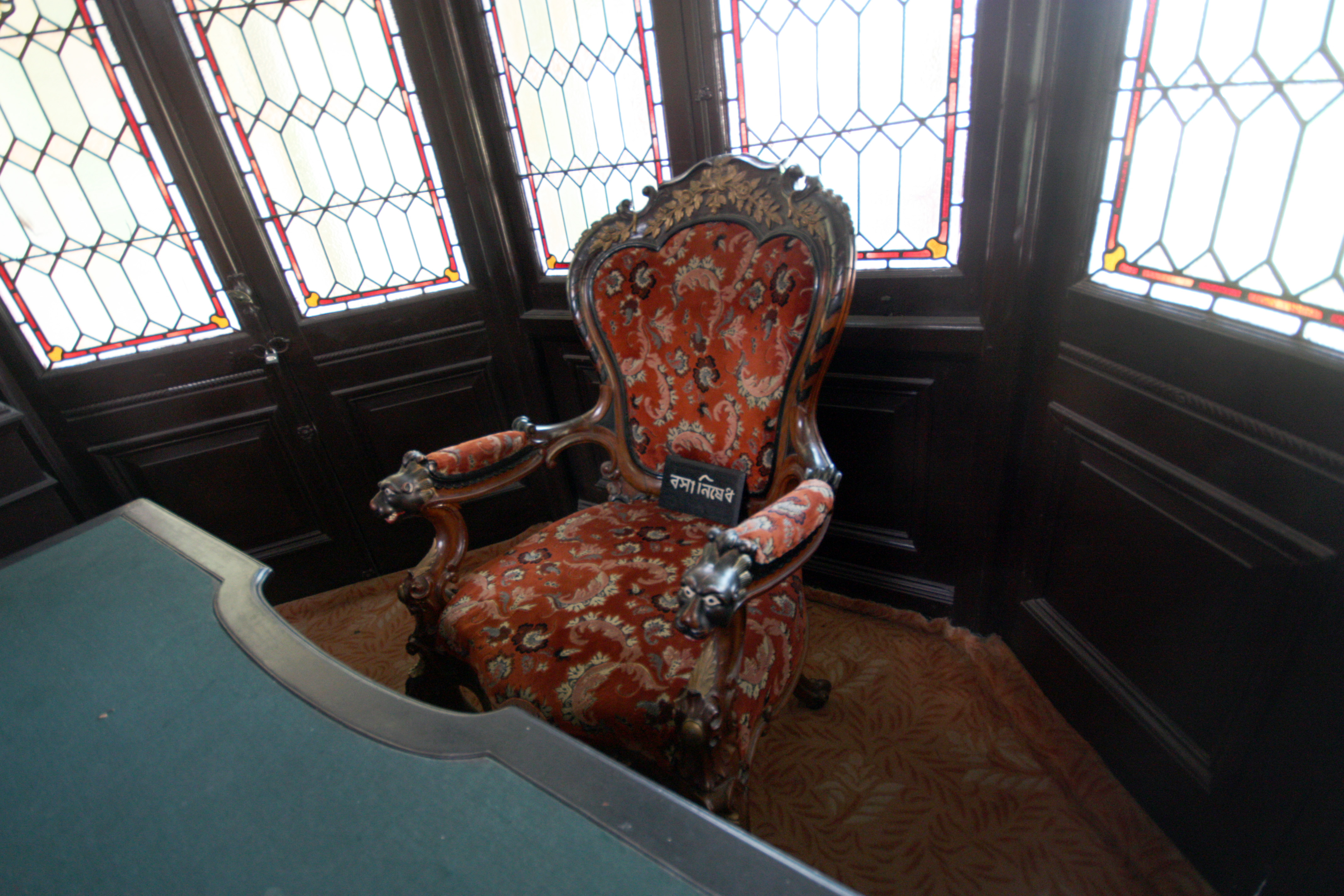
The chair of a maharaja

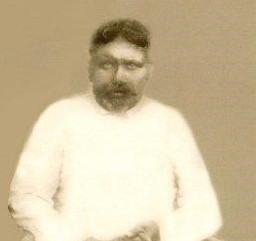
Chowdhury Moyezuddin Biwshash of Amirabad Estate, Faridpur

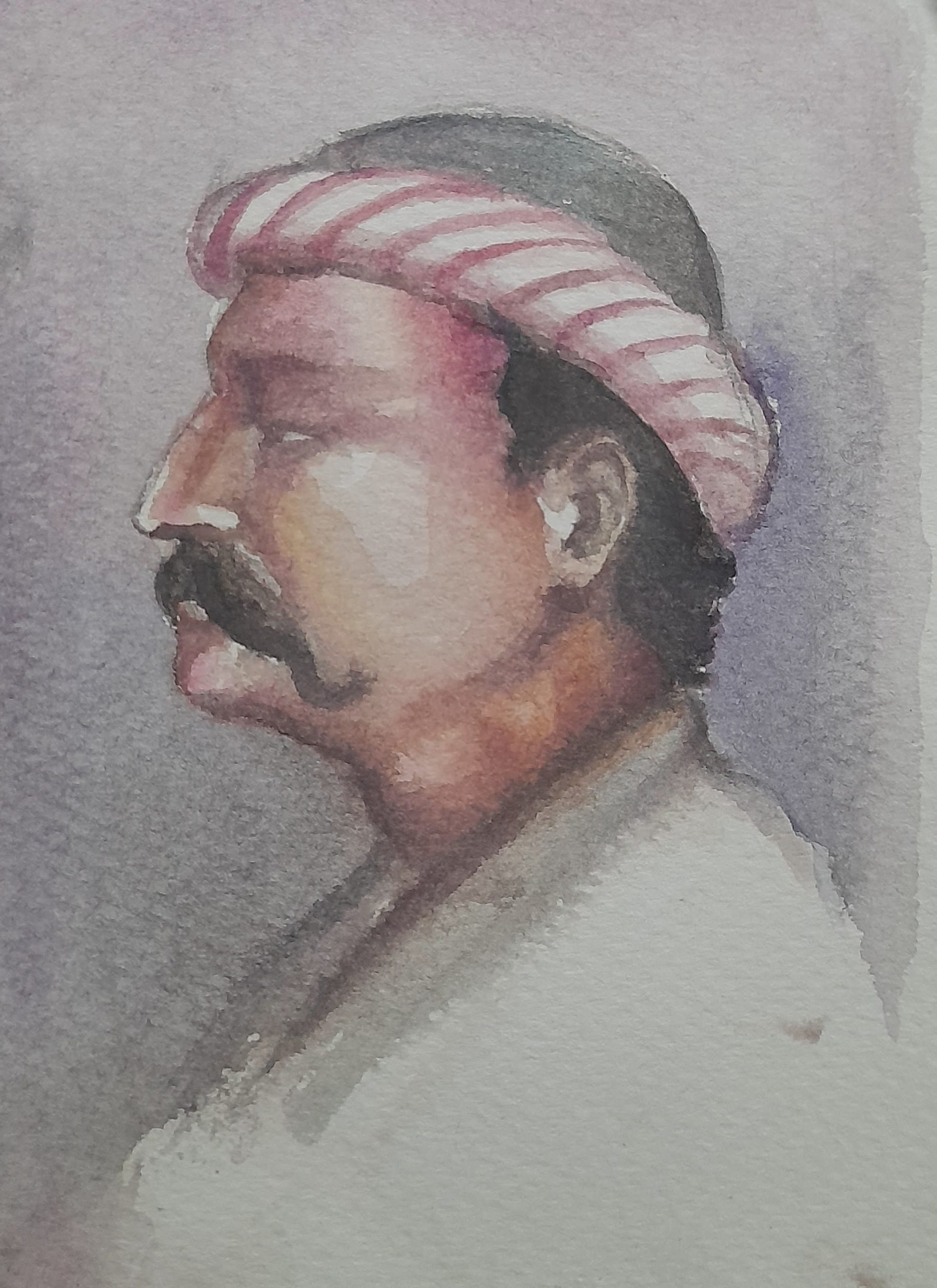
Banwari Munshi of Chougachi Estate

Under the British, the zamindars grew very wealthy. In 1934, the Muslim Dhaka Nawab Family had an estate that covered almost 1200 km^{2} across different districts of Bengal and Assam and in the cities of Calcutta and Shillong. They earned £120,000 in rent annually (US$16.5 million in 2022). With its wealth, social status, and close relationship with the British Raj, the family of the Nawab of Dacca was the single most powerful Muslim family in Bengal. The Dhaka Nawab Family also owned a major diamond, which is now preserved in a vault of Sonali Bank. The largest 100 estates out of 1200 tier 1 estates covered 75% of the land in Bengal, and the remaining 25% was divided between the remainder, i.e., approximately 1100 estates. Some families, such as, the Hindu Rajshahi Raj estate, covered territories covering 13,000 km^{2.}. British East India found collecting revenue from a single mammoth unit too complex and politically risky, prompting them to divide it and aggressively apply the "sunset law" to fragment the territory into multiple smaller estates. Burdwan Raj family (or Burdhaman) ruled over territories in excess of 13,000 km^{2}, Bhawal Raj estate covered 1500 km^{2}. Muslim Chowdhury Moyezuddin Bishwash estate covered nearly 4000 km^{2}. Similarly, a group of estates in Southern and Western Bengal like Narajole, Jhargram, Mallick Bari, and Mahishadal covered several districts in what is today Paschim Medinipur, Purba Medinipur, Contai, Jhargram, and the industrial township of Kharagpur. Some of these families, notably Narajole and Mallick Bari – whose zamindars Raja Narendralal Khan and Chowdhuri Jamininath Mallick were convicted in 1911 – were also significantly involved in financing the Indian nationalist movement.

== See also ==
- Indian feudalism
- Indian honorifics
- Princely state
- Zamindars of Bihar
- List of zamindari estates in Madras Presidency
