= Sarat Chandra Majumdar =

Sarat Chandra Majumdar was a Bengali scheduled caste politician and former provincial minister of East Pakistan.

== Early life ==
Majumdar was born on 14 September 1897 in Pordanga, Jessore District, Bengal Presidency, British India. His father was Darpa Narayan Majumdar, who worked as the rent collector for the Chanchra Raj Estate. His uncle, Raicharan Majumdar, was a notable Dalit rights activist. She graduated from Panjia Secondary School in 1920. He graduated with a B.A. from Daulatpur Hindu Academy (Now Brajalal College) in 1925. He completed a Bachelor of Laws at the University of Calcutta in 1937.

== Career ==
Majumdar worked as a teacher at Mashiahati High School, which was founded by his uncle, Raicharan Majumdar. He was elected Board President of Kultia Union. He was a member of the Jessore Sadar Local Board. He was appointed Assistant Secretary of the Bengal Namasudra Association in 1933. He was the vice-president of the Namasudra Association in Kolkata. He worked to prevent the forcible conversion of Bengali Dalits in Sylhet by Muslims. In 1935, he joined the Indian National Congress.

In 1946, Majumdar was elected to the Bengal Provisional Congress Executive Committee. After the Partition of India, he chose to stay in East Pakistan. He was elected to the East Pakistan Legislative Assembly in 1954 as a candidate of the Pakistan National Congress. From 1955 to 1958, he served as a provincial minister of Fisheries of East Pakistan. He served in the cabinet of Ataur Rahman Khan along with fellow Pakistan National Congress politician Monoranjan Dhar. On 28 June 1961, he moved to West Bengal, India, after the government of Pakistan imposed martial law.
