= Manik Ram Basu =

Indian businessman

Maharaja Manik Ram Basu
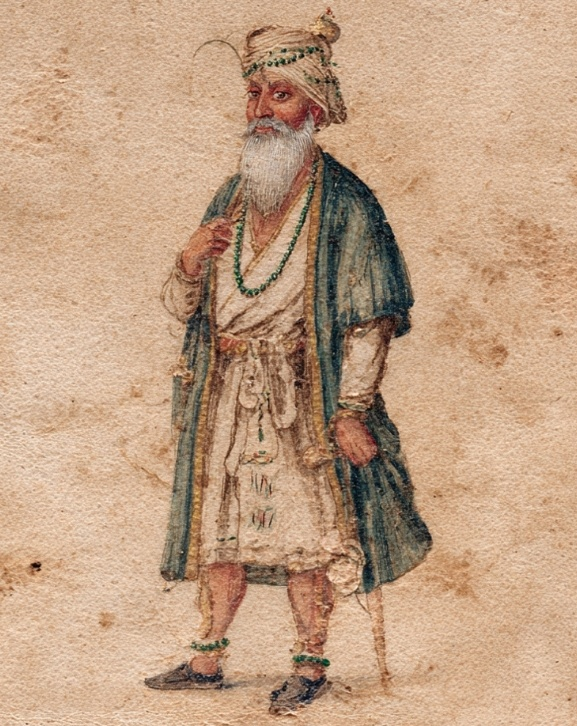

1st Maharaja of Manikganj and Hatkhola
- Succeeded by: Raja Ram Hari Basu

Personal details
- Born: 1741 Jessore, Khulna, Bangladesh
- Died: 1811 (aged 69–70) Manikganj, Dhaka District, Bangladesh
- Profession: Zamindar

Maharaja Manik Ram Basu (also known as Raja Manik Ram Basu) was the founder of the Manikganj Raj, which later became known as the Hatkhola royal family. He was one of the most influential zamindars of Bengal, and under his rule the estate achieved significant administrative and territorial expansion.

== History ==
Under the leadership of Maharaja Manik Ram Basu, the Manikganj Raj included extensive areas of present-day Barishal, Manikganj, Dhaka, and Jessore regions. He was known as an efficient administrator and a powerful zamindar, and the estate he founded later emerged as one of the major zamindari powers in Bengal.

After the death of Manik Ram Basu, the estate was administered by his son Ram Hari Basu and later by his grandson Raja Ishwar Ram Basu from the Hatkhola region. From this period onward, the estate became more widely known as the Hatkhola Raj.

== Family ==
Raja Ishwar Ram Basu had four daughters, out of which Kailashkamini was married to Peary Charan Sarkar. The grand-daughter of Peary Charan and Kailashkamini, Amiyabala Dhar, was the Maharani Consort IV of the House of Dar.

== See also ==
- Peary Charan Sarkar
