= Naldanga Raj =

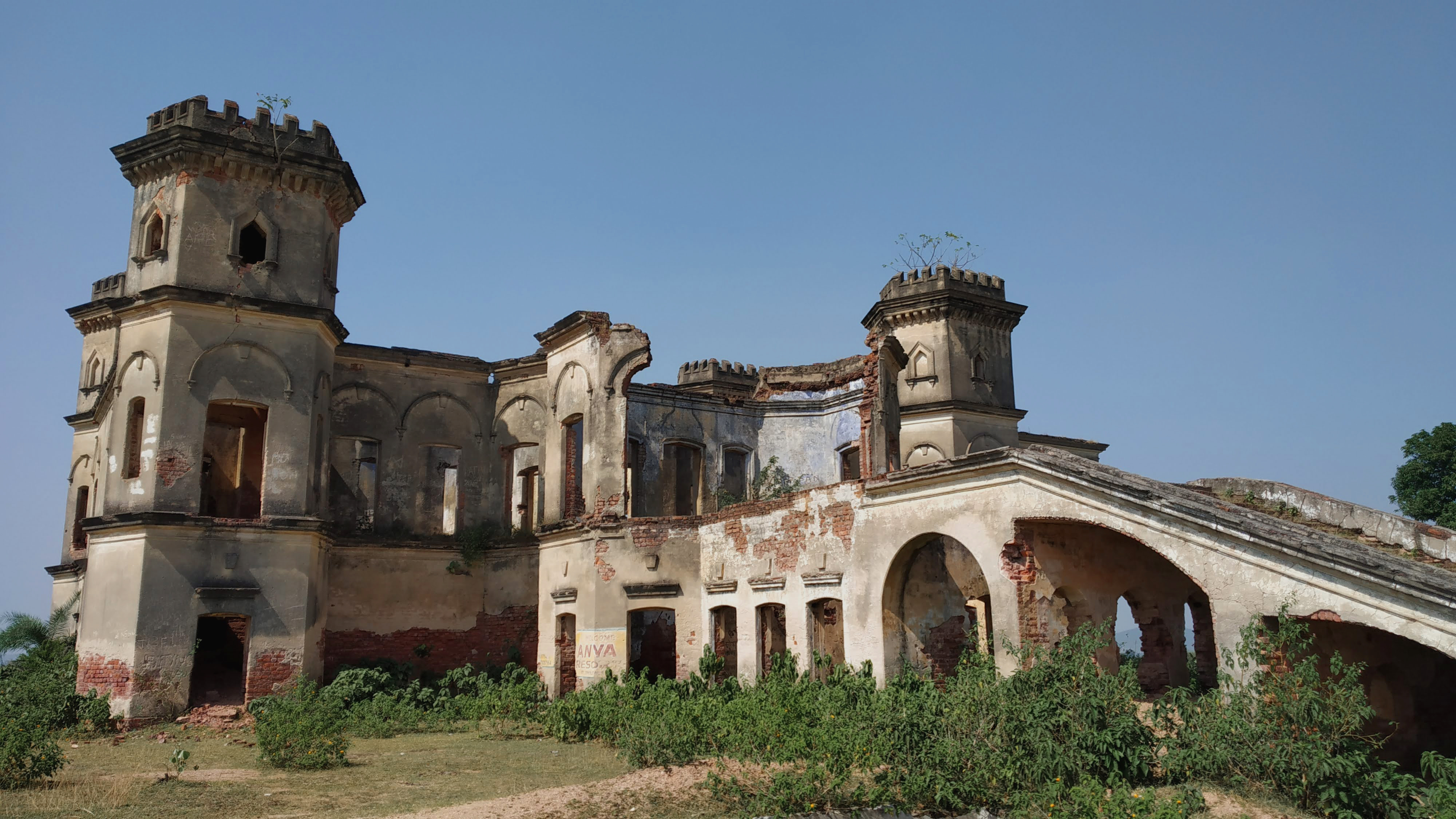
- Location: Naldanga, Jessore District, Bangladesh

Naldanga Raj (Bengali: নালডাঙ্গা রাজ) was the seat of the zamindars of Naldanga, a prominent landed family in Jessore district, undivided India (now in Bangladesh). It was established before the Mughal and British colonial periods.

The zamindari was notable as the only Brahman-controlled zamindari in the district and for its role in the religious, social, and political uplift of life in southern Bengal.

== Historical background ==
After the decline of Sitaram Rai in the 18th century, Jessore district was divided among three prominent zamindaris: the Raja of Jessore (the Chanchra Raja) held the southern portion, the Raja of Naldanga controlled the Mahmudshahi zamindari in the north, and the Raja of Natore governed the zamindari of Bhushna. The Naldanga family were the only Brahman zamindars in the district, while most others were Kayasths. There was also one European zamindar, Mr. Tweedie. Both he and the Raja of Naldanga were resident landlords, in contrast to most others who lived away from their estates.

== Tenure and society ==
Jessore's agrarian society operated through multiple layers of tenure. Members of the higher classes: Muhammadans, Brahmans, Baidyas, and Kayasths, typically did not till the soil themselves. Instead, they acquired permanent interests from zamindars and sublet the land to under-tenure-holders, who in turn sublet it again. This chain continued until the actual cultivators were reached. The Sheikhs and lower Hindu castes such as Kaibarttas, Chasas, Dhopas, and Namasudras were usually occupancy or non-occupancy ryots, while agricultural labourers generally belonged to the Namasudra or Sheikh communities.

A report by the Collector in 1800 revealed that no fewer than 1,000 estates in Jessore were in arrears. Among those ruined was Raja Srikanta Rai of Yusufpur, the largest landholder in the district, who lost his parganas one by one. Two branches of the Naldanga family holding the Mahmudshahi estate also lost their properties within ten years of the Permanent Settlement and were reduced to poverty. A third branch, founded by Ram Sankar, narrowly avoided the same fate with the intervention of the Collector.

== Origins of the family ==
The Naldanga family traced its descent to Haladhar Bhattacharji, a Brahman of Bhabrasuba in Dacca district who lived about 700 years ago. His fifth-generation descendant, Bishnu Das Hazra, settled about 500 years ago at Kharasani near Naldanga, a site then overgrown with reeds. Tradition holds that when Man Singh I and his entourage were stranded in this jungle with dwindling supplies, Bishnu Das miraculously provided food. In gratitude, Man Singh granted him five adjoining villages, which formed the nucleus of the Naldanga zamindari. Bishnu Das's son, Srimanta Rai, used his newly minted army to launch campaigns against these regional Afghan chieftains, most notably defeating the Afghan zamindars of Saruppur, and annexed their lands. Man Singh I, impressed with his prowess and his loyalty in clearing out the rebels, gave him a massive land grant and titled him Ranabir Khan.

The Naldanga zamindari reached its zenith in 1656, when Chandicharan Deb Rai, Srimanta Deb Rai's descendant, was given the title of Raja, a khilat and a robe of honour by the then Subedar of Bengal, Shah Shuja (Mughal prince), the son of Shah Jahan.

== Later kings ==
Raja Chandicharan Deb Rai died shortly after and was succeeded by his heir, Raja Indranarayan Deb Rai, who devoted his time to worship and religious rites. He reigned from 1656 to 1685, and was followed by his heir Raja Suryanarayan Deb Rai. His son, Raja Udaynarayan Deb Rai, fell into heavy debt due to a luxurious lifestyle and was stabbed to death in 1698 by a Mughal military captain, Shamser Khan, following a conspiracy framed by the Raja's ambitious brother, Ramdeb. His younger brother, Ramdeb Rai, then took over the zamindari and reigned until 1727, later dedicating much of his wealth to charitable causes.

His heir, Raghu Deb Rai, reigned from 1727 to 1737, until he temporarily lost his lands and was deposed for three years due to a failure to pay taxes. During this period, his lands were held by the zamindar of Natore. Raghu Deb Rai recovered his lands and title in 1740. During the subsequent Maratha invasions of Bengal led by Raghuji I (a period in which contemporary Dutch sources estimated the Bargis killed 400,000 Bengalis, and historian P.J. Marshall noted that a great many merchants in western Bengal "were permanently crippled by losses and extractions"), he sheltered and gave asylum to Raja Chitra Sen Rai, the then Maharaja of the Bardhaman Raj. To seal this lifelong friendship, the two rulers traditionally exchanged turbans.

In gratitude for his safety, Chitra Sen constructed the Goonjanath temple in Tailkupi, installing a symbolic representation of Lord Shiva. This temple ultimately gave rise to the name of the local village, Goonjanagar.

Following Raja Raghu Deb Rai's death in 1748, his son, Raja Krishna Deb Rai, reigned from 1748 until 1773. After his demise, the estate was split into three parts among his three heirs. One of these divisions, the eastern portion consisting of a two-fifths share known as Grada Poorba, was allocated to Raja Ramshankar Dev Rai. Although the shares were managed jointly with his brother until 1796, they subsequently separated, making Ramsankar Deb Rai the independent ruler of his particular division. Locally referred to as the Chhota Raja (Junior Raja), he was married to Rani Radhamani Devi, who committed sati (practice) on the same day he died.

The estate then passed to his grandson, Raja Sashi Bhushan Deb Rai, because his son, Kumar Mohanchand Deb Rai, had predeceased him on 24 October 1811. Since Sashi Bhushan Deb Rai was born in late 1811, the estate was transferred to the minor Raja on 1 January 1813 under the administration of a guardian. Upon reaching his majority, he undertook significant construction projects and expanded his holdings by purchasing an eight-anna share of Sanchani, Pratappur, Kanejpur, and Kusabaria, alongside a four-and-one-eighth share of the Nasratshahi pargana. He married Rani Joydurga Devi and died in 1834. Following his death, Rani Joydurga Devi managed the estate until 1836, and she later died in 1837.

Following the end of Rani Joydurga Devi's management in 1836, the estate came under the administration of the Court of Wards from 1836 to 1853. During this period, the estate was held for Raja Indu Bhushan Deb Rai, who was born in 1834 and had been adopted in 1836 by the widow of the late Raja. Indu Bhushan Dev Rai took formal charge of the zamindari upon the conclusion of the Court of Wards administration in 1853 and remained the Zamindar of Naldanga until 1870.

== Estate and revenues ==
At its height, the Naldanga estate was scattered across Jessore, Nadia district, and Faridpur District. The gross annual income was reported at Rs. 2,60,481. Obligations included Rs. 51,116 in government revenue, Rs. 94,116 in superior rents, Rs. 11,573 in cesses, and Rs. 5,395 in additional rents, totaling Rs. 1,62,200 annually in mandatory payments.

== The Rajbari complex ==
Naldanga village was located two miles from Kaliganj, nine miles from Jhenaidah, and twenty miles from Jessore, connected by a metalled road. The zamindar maintained a post and telegraph office, a dispensary, and a high school in the village. The estate encompassed four villages: Naldanga proper, Matbati, Kadipur, and Ganjanagar. The zamindar's residence was at Ganjanagar, on the banks of the Benga (Begbati) river, and included the Chandimandap hall reserved for Durga Puja worship.

Matbati village was notable for its eight ancient temples dedicated to the family's deities, including an important Kali temple at Kalikatala Daha. A portion of the estate, called Iswarbrithi, was set aside to fund daily worship at these temples and to provide meals for uninvited guests.

=== Simultala Palace (Rajar Bari) ===
In addition to the primary ancestral estate in Ganjanagar, Raja Pramatha Bhusan Deb Roy constructed a grand secondary mansion and farmhouse in Simultala, located in the Jamui district of modern-day Bihar, India. Known locally as "Rajar Bari", this estate was built amidst hills and plateaus as a seasonal retreat. While the outer structure still stands on a hillside, the mansion has suffered severe abandonment and structural neglect over the decades, transitioning into a prominent local historical ruin. The climax of the 2019 Bengali mystery-adventure film Durgeshgorer Guptodhon was filmed on the grounds of the Rajar Bari complex.

== Legends and folklore ==
Several legends are associated with the temples of Naldanga:

- The Pancha Mundi Bedi altar beneath the Kali temple was said to rest on the heads of five beings: a Chandal woman, monkey, cat, mongoose, and jackal. Worshippers who attempted to conduct rituals here were supposedly thrown into the Kalikatala Daha by spirits, until Bhairab Bhattacharjya managed to complete the worship successfully.
- Around a century ago, fishermen reported hearing sounds of conches, bells, and gongs at midnight over the waters of the Kalikatala Daha, believed to be worship performed by aquatic deities.
- Raja Indra Narayan Deb Rai (r.1656-1685), guided by the ascetic Brahmananda Giri, built the Indreswari temple at Matbati. After his death, his son Surya Narayan was instructed in a vision to sanctify the idol as Siddheswari. According to legend, Brahmananda descended into the Kalikatala Daha thereafter and never returned.

== Cultural role ==
The Naldanga zamindars maintained Hindu customs and festivals, especially the annual Durga Puja at the Chandimandap. They also supported education through Chatuspathis (traditional schools), granted pensions and rent-free lands to Brahmans, and provided for temple maintenance and charitable hospitality.

== Political involvement ==
=== British colonial era and 1857 mutiny ===
During the Sepoy Mutiny of 1857, the estate was under the management of Raja Indu Bhusan Deb Roy (1834–1871). Unlike the rebelling sepoys, the Naldanga Rajbari actively supported the British East India Company administration to protect their regional authority and secure the estate from unrest. The Raja provided critical logistical and tactical aid to the British authorities, which included supplying several elephants for military transport and baggage hauling across the river-dense terrain of Bengal.

In recognition of his loyalty and assistance during the crisis, the British government formally confirmed his hereditary title of Raja in 1860.

=== Raja Bahadur Pramatha Bhusan Deb Roy (r. 1879–1941) ===
Raja Bahadur Pramatha Bhusan Deb Roy (22 December 1858 – c. 1941) was the tenth Raja of Naldanga, Jessore district, in the Bengal Presidency.

Born on 22 December 1858, Pramatha Bhusan was not a direct biological heir to the Naldanga dynasty. He was the youngest son of Govinda Ghoshal, a resident of Kumrabaria village. Following the early death of Raja Indu Bhusan Deb Roy in 1871 without a biological son, Pramatha Bhusan was adopted into the family to secure the lineage, with the estate temporarily managed under the supervision of the Court of Wards (India) until he attained his majority in 1879.

Deb Roy established scholarships for Sanskrit learning, medals for female education, and a dispensary, as well as upgrading Government Naldanga Bhushan Pilot Secondary School to an English High School in 1882. He was accorded the title of Raja in 1885 by the British Government due to his support of widow remarriage and was an ardent supporter of Ishwar Chandra Vidyasagar, which earned the ire of the conservative press, the Bangabasi, during that time. In his 1888 publication chronicling his travels in India, author Robert Wallace (professor) noted that the Raja took a progressive stance on the modernization of his estate, commending his direct interest in agricultural development and livestock improvement.

He was a member of the 1905 committee of Bengali aristocrats and zamindars that opposed the Partition of Bengal (1905). He collaborated with Maharaja Prodyot Coomar Tagore and nationalist leader Surendranath Banerjee, highlighting the Naldanga family's engagement in the wider political debates of colonial Bengal.

He was also involved in the Swadeshi movement as one of the directors of Mohini Mills Ltd. (1908), a Bengali textile enterprise founded to counter British-made goods, where he served alongside Rabindranath Tagore and other leading figures.

He received the Delhi Durbar Medal (1911), awarded on the occasion of the Delhi Durbar marking the coronation of George V as Emperor of India, and was also accorded the personal rank of Raja Bahadur in 1913. He served as a member of the Jessore District Board and was elected to the British Indian Association.

He married Patitpabani Devi in 1873 and had four daughters: Rajkumari Surasaibalini Devi (b. 1878-?), Rajkumari Pankajini Devi, Rajkumari Binapani Devi, and Rajkumari Sarojini Devi; and two sons: Kumar Pannaga Deb Roy (b. 1882–?) and Kumar Mrigankakumar Deb Roy (b. 1889–?).

He died in Varanasi in the early months of 1941 at the age of 83, and after his death, Kumar Pannaga Deb Roy succeeded him as Raja. After the Partition of India (1947), the family continued to reside in India and split into several branches.

== Decline and legacy ==
The decline of the zamindari system in the late colonial and early East Pakistan periods diminished the fortunes of the family. Many of the temples at Matbati and parts of the Rajbari complex survive, though in varying states of preservation. The zamindari remains an important part of Jessore's historical and cultural heritage. Members of the family later settled in Varanasi and in parts of West Bengal.

== Coat of Arms ==
Coat of arms of Naldanga Raj
Notes The arms of the Naldanga Zamindari family, highlighting regional spiritual iconography. Crest A trident between two cross-swords Escutcheon Argent, a crescent moon proper, in chief a trident between two cross-swords.

== See also ==
- Zamindars of Bengal
- Partition of Bengal (1905)
- History of Bengal
