= Baliati Zamindari =

Historical place in Saturia Upazila, Manikganj, Bangladesh

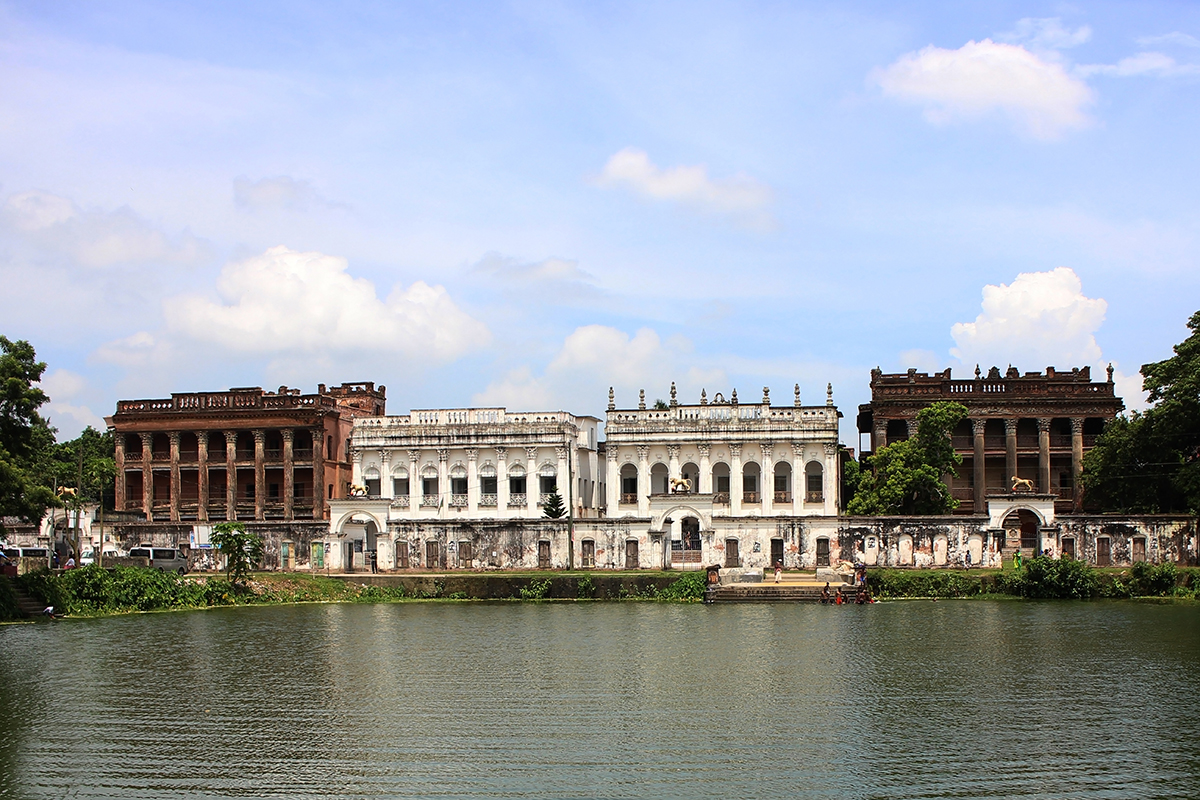
- Baliati palace in Manikganj
- Country: Bangladesh
- Founder: Gobinda Ram Shaha
- Website: baliatipalace.com

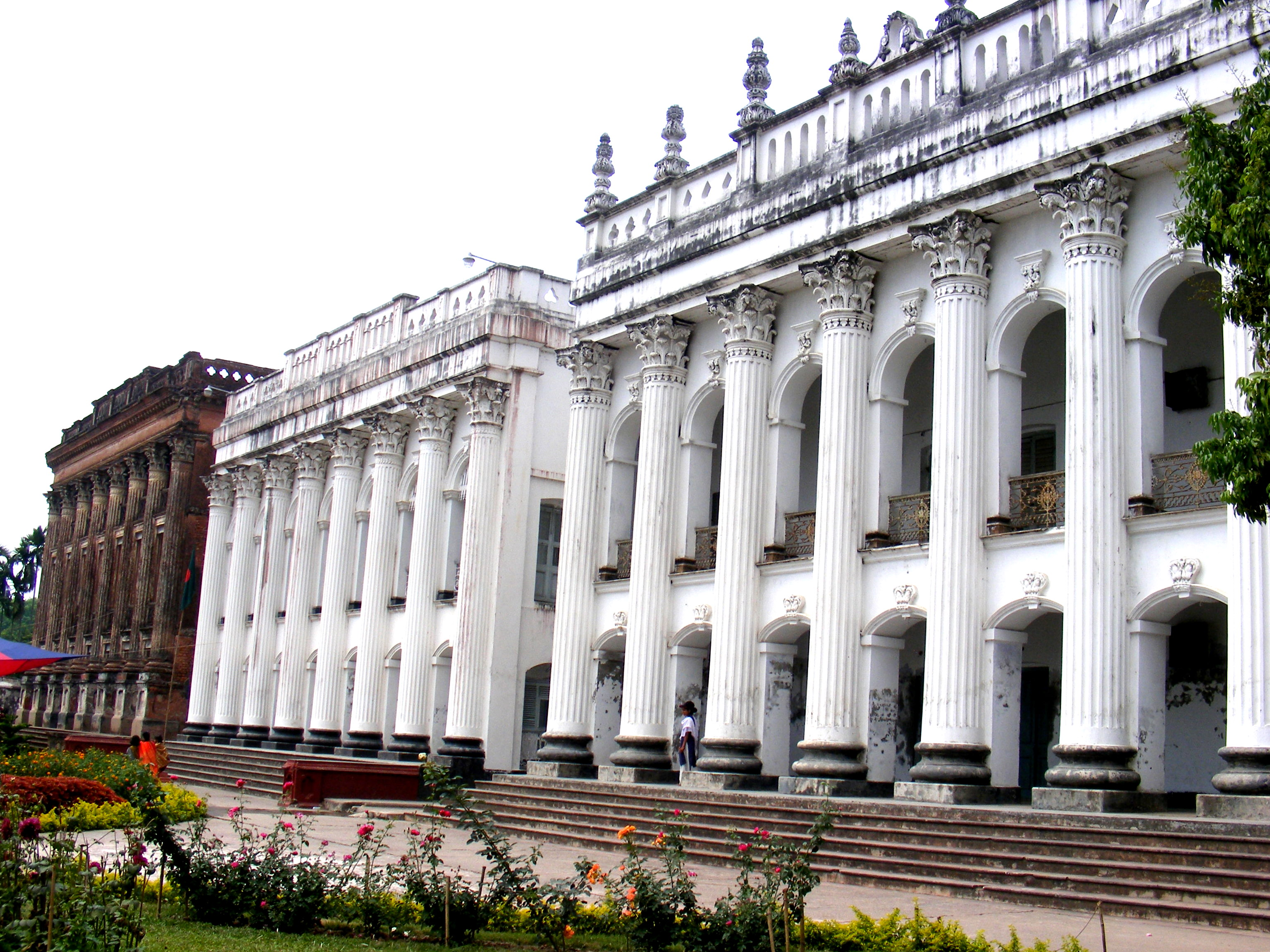
Closer view of palaces

Baliati Zamindar Bari (Bengali: বালিয়াটি জমিদার বাড়ি) is in the village of Baliati, in Saturia Upazila in Manikganj District, Bangladesh. It is the palace of the Zamindars, the Baliati Zamindari who ruled over a large area. The Baliati Jamindar Bari is located at 23.9952°N 90.0419°E.

== History ==
Gobinda Ram Saha was the settler of the zamindari at Baliati. He was a salt merchant. He inherited the business from his parent, then he extended that business further and established the zamindari. The zamindari extended to Narayanganj District.

=== Architecture ===
There are seven palaces. The palace area occupies around 5.88 acres (23,800 m^{2}) of land, enclosed within a moat and a perimeter wall. There are about 200 rooms inside the premises. At the back of the Palace is a pond (dighi).

=== Abolition ===
At the end of the 18th century, Zamindar Harendra Kumar Roy Chowdhury officially sold some parts of the Zamindari of Narayanganj to Sreemoti Alladi BiBi who was the owner of Talluk and her husband Zamindar Rahim Bakhsh Haji. The palaces have been administered by the Bangladesh archeological department since 1987. And it is said that after separation in 1947, all the ancestors left for India.

== See also ==
- List of archaeological sites in Bangladesh
