= Manikganj =

Manikganj মানিকগঞ্জ
- Municipality
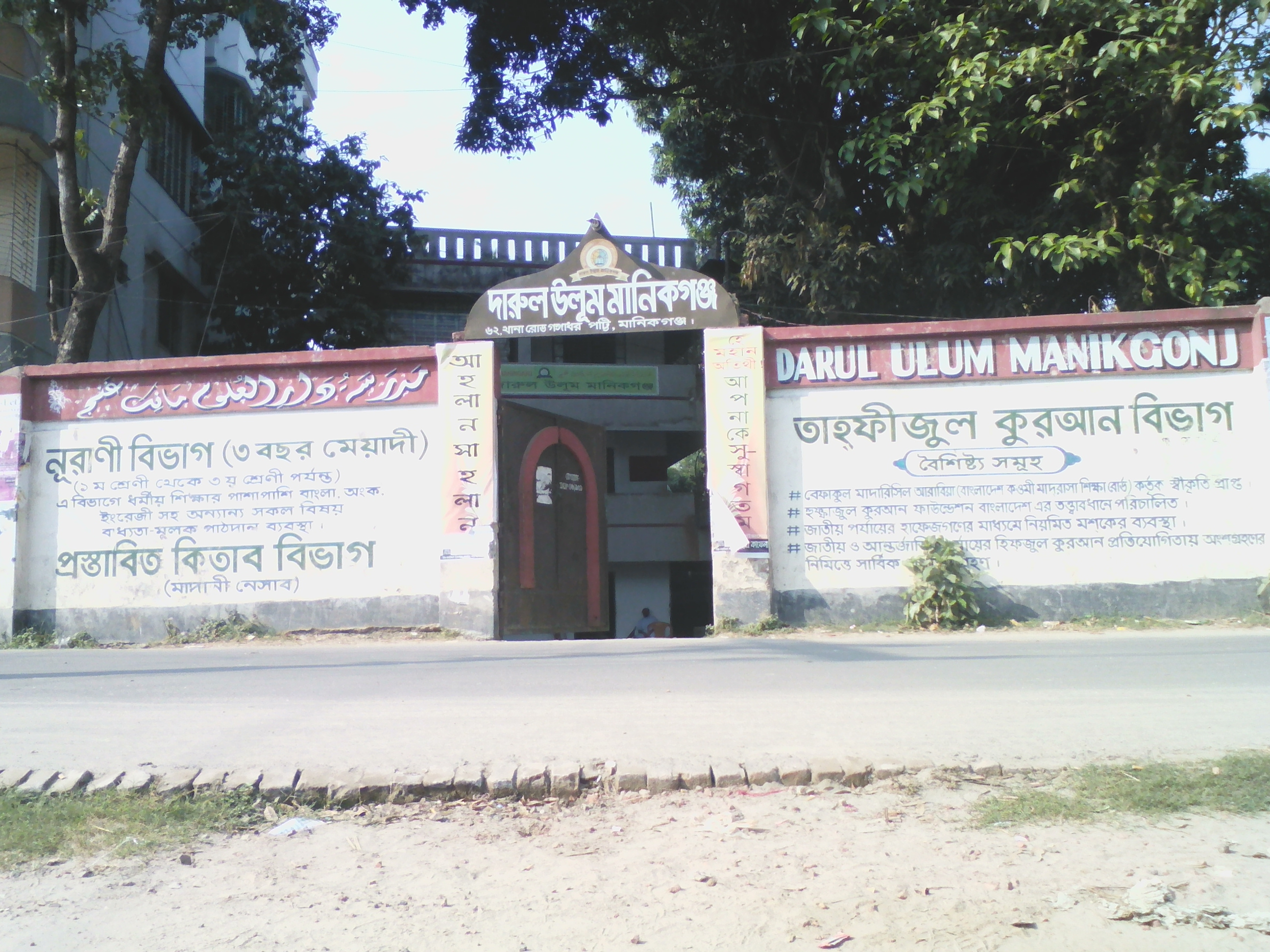
- Darul Uloom Manikganj

- Location within Dhaka division Location within Bangladesh
- Coordinates: 23°51′N 90°01′E
- Country: Bangladesh
- Division: Dhaka
- District: Manikganj
- Upazila: Manikganj Sadar
- Named for: Maharaja Manik Ram Basu; Sufi saint Manik Sha

Government
  - Type: Mayor–Council
  - Body: Manikganj Municipal Corporation

Area
  - Total: 2.28 km^{2} (0.88 sq mi)

Population
  - Total: 71,698
  - Density: 31,400/km^{2} (81,400/sq mi)
- Time zone: UTC+6 (Bangladesh Time)
- National Dialing Code: +880

Manikganj Municipality mahallah geocode map

Manikganj is a town situated in Dhaka Division, Bangladesh. It serves as the administrative centre of both Manikganj District and Manikganj Sadar Upazila. Noted for its relatively low levels of pollution, the town has experienced recent urban development, including the construction of a highway linking Dhaka with Singair Upazila, thereby enhancing regional connectivity and transportation infrastructure. The Padma River flows adjacent to the district, contributing to its ecological diversity and supporting a range of local flora and fauna. Manikganj plays a strategic role in inter-regional connectivity, linking the north-western and south-western parts of Bangladesh via the Paturia and Aricha ferry terminals. The area is locally renowned for the production of molasses, particularly from the village of Jhitka, and features several cultural and historical landmarks. Among these, the Baliati Zamindari Palace stands out as a prominent tourist attraction, reflecting the architectural heritage of the region.

== History ==
Manikganj was the home to the Baliati Zamindari and royal family of Raja Manik Ram Basu. Manikganj is believed to have been named after Raja Manik Ram Basu. Raja Manik Ram Basu was the monarch of the Manikganj Raj and Hatkhola royal family, in North Calcutta. His granddaughter Princess Kalishakamini Dasi was married to Peary Charan Sarkar.

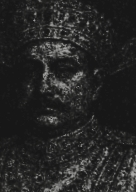
Maharaja III Manik Ram Basu of Hatkhola and Manikganj

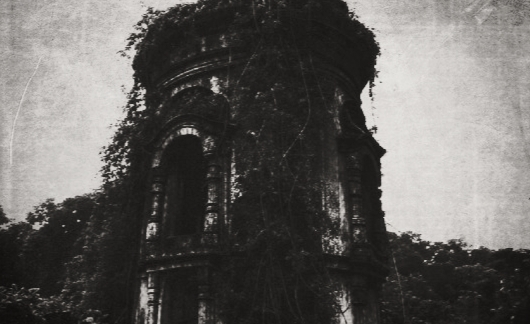
Hatkhola royal family palace entrance painting, 1750s. Zamindar Palace in Manikganj.

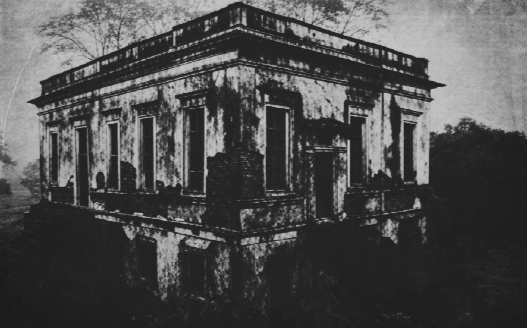
The Manikganj Basu Zamindar Palace

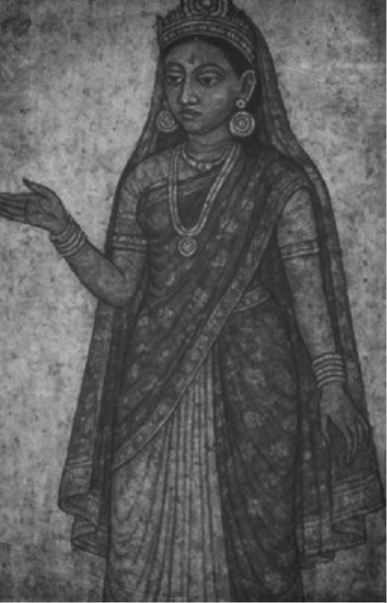
Maharani I of Manikganj - Maharani Soudamini Devi

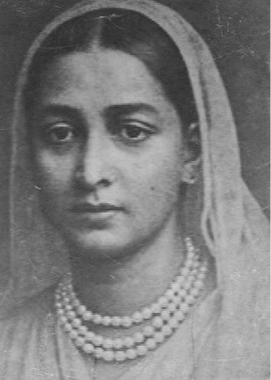
Princess Kailash Kamini Sarkar, wife of Peary Charan Sarkar, princess of Hatkhola royal family and descendant of Manikganj Zamindari, daughter and granddaughter of Raja Shib Narayan Basu and Maharaja Manik Ram Basu

=== List of rulers of Manikganj ===
Expanded royal Zamindari lineage of royal Basu family
| Monarch name | Reign period | Consort name | Region |
|---|---|---|---|
| Maharaja Ishwar Ram Basu | c. 1745–c. 1765 | Rani Soudamini Devi | Manikganj, Dhaka |
| Maharaja Darpanarayan Basu | c. 1765–c. 1770 | Rani Priyamvada Devi | Manikganj, Barisal |
| Maharaja Manik Ram Basu | c. 1770–c. 1785 | Rani Indumati Devi | Manikganj, Hatkhola Jessore |
| Maharaja Ram Hari Basu | c. 1785–c. 1789 | Rani Satyavati Devi | Manikganj Hatkhola |
| Maharaja Shib Narayan Basu | c. 1789–c. 1797 | Rani Kamalini Devi | Manikganj Hatkhola |

== Demographics ==
Religions in Manikganj (2011)
| Religion | Percent |
| Islam | 85.50% |
| Hinduism | 14.43% |
| Other or not stated | 0.07% |

At the time of the 2011 census, Manikganj Paurashava had 16,459 households and a population of 71,698. 13,017 (18.16%) were under 10 years of age. Manikganj had a literacy rate of 69.10% and a sex ratio of 987 females per 1000 males.

== See also ==
- Manikganj District
- Manikganj Sadar Upazila
- List of cities and towns in Bangladesh
- Upazilas of Bangladesh
