= Hatkhola =

Village in West Bengal, India

Hatkhola হাটখোলা
- Village
- Interactive map of Hatkhola
- Country: India
- State: West Bengal
- District: Nadia
- Subdivision: Chapra

Area
  - Total: 6.02 km^{2} (2.32 sq mi)

Population (2011)
  - Total: 7,164
  - Density: 1,190/km^{2} (3,080/sq mi)
- Time zone: UTC+5:30 (IST)

Hatkhola is a village located in the Chapra subdivision of Nadia district, in the state of West Bengal, India. It is situated approximately 9.2 km from the sub-district headquarters at Bangaljhi and 27 km from the district headquarters at Krishnanagar.

== Geography ==
Hatkhola covers a total area of 602.49 hectares. The village is part of the Chapra community development block and serves as a gram panchayat.

== Demographics ==
According to the 2011 Census of India, Hatkhola has a total population of 7,164, with 3,738 males and 3,426 females. The literacy rate of the village stands at 57.22%, with male literacy at 58.88% and female literacy at 55.40%.

== Economy ==
The nearest town for major economic activities is Krishnanagar, located approximately 10 km away. The village has access to public and private bus services, as well as a railway station within a 10 km radius.

== Administration ==
Hatkhola functions as a gram panchayat within the Chapra block. It is governed under the Nadia district administration. It was the home to the Hatkhola royal family of Raja Manik Ram Basu who was also one of the wealthiest Zamindars in Manikganj. Manikganj is said to have been named after him. Hatkhola is also famous for the Andul Dutta Chaudhury Family.
