= Khalil Kazi =

Khalil Kazi OBE is a British-Bangladeshi social activist. He was awarded the Independence Award, the highest civilian award in Bangladesh, for his social work in 2017.

Kazi was born on the 27 September 1942 in Manikganj District, East Bengal, British India. He graduated from Manikganj Government High School and Government Debendra College. He did his master's degree at Cardiff University and another master's at University of Westminster.

Kazi fought in Sector 2 and Sector 3 during the Bangladesh Liberation War. He moved to the United Kingdom in 1974. He established Dhaka Theaters and Dhaka Association in London.

In February 1984, Kazi build a Shaheed Minar, a monument to the Bengali Language movement, in the Bangladesh Center. In 2000, he received the Order of the British Empire.
