= Kotkandi =

- Village
- Country: Bangladesh
- District: Manikganj
- Upazila: Harirampur

Population
  - Total: 1,346

Kotkandi is a village of Kanchanpur Union, Harirampur Upazila, Manikganj District, Bangladesh.

Musharuf chairman also born in this village. He already elected three terms. Both Hindu and Muslim live in this village majority are Muslims. Main cultural festive are Eid al-Fitr and Eid al-Adha.

== Demographics ==
According to the 2011 Bangladesh census, Kotkandi had 329 households and a population of 1,346.
