= Kanchanpur Union =

Kanchanpur Union may refer to:

- Kanchanpur Union, Manikganj, a union in Kachua Upazila
- Kanchanpur Union, Tangail, a union in Tangail District
