= Kumudini Welfare Trust =

Bangladeshi charitable organisation

- Formation: 1947
- Headquarters: Mirzapur, Tangail, Bangladesh
- Region served: Bangladesh
- Official language: Bengali
- Website: Kumudini Welfare Trust

Kumudini Welfare Trust is one of the oldest and largest charitable organisations in Bangladesh and is located in Tangail District.

== History ==
Ranadaprasad Saha, philanthropist and businessman, founded the charity in 1947 in Bengal as Kumudini Welfare Trust of Bengal. It was named after his mother Kumudini. From 1971 to 1999 the trust was managed by Saha's daughter, Joya Pati. From 2000 Rajiv Prashad Shaha, the grandson of Ranadaprasad Saha, has headed the trust. The trust manages Kumudini Hospital, Bharateswari Homes, Ranada Prasad Shaha University, Nursing School, Women's Medical College, Trade training School, and Kumudini Handicrafts.
