= Daulatpur Upazila, Manikganj =

Daulatpur দৌলতপুর
- Upazila
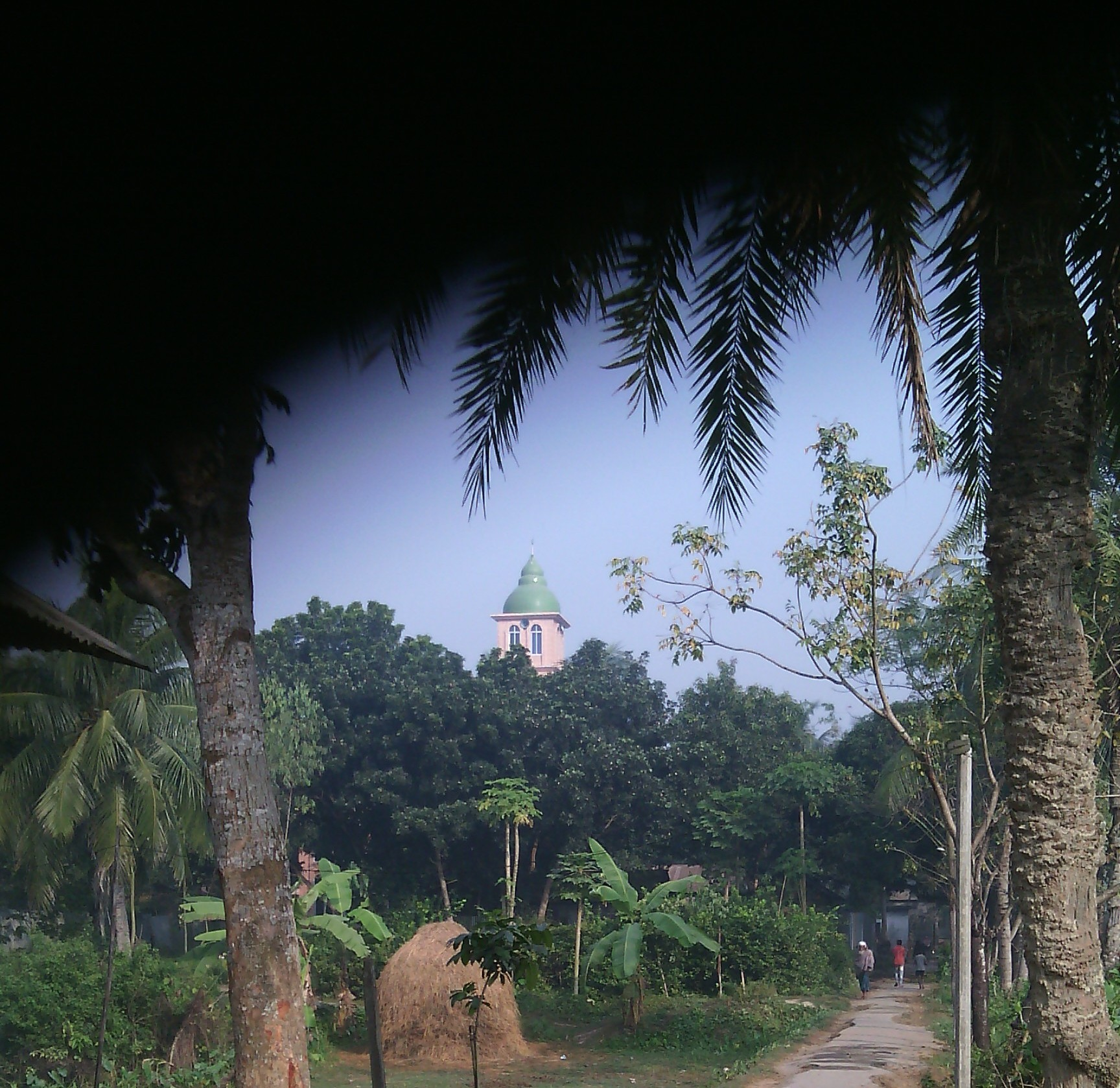
- Ghariyalar Mosque

- Coordinates: 23°57.7′N 89°50.5′E
- Country: Bangladesh
- Division: Dhaka
- District: Manikganj

Area
  - Total: 216.24 km^{2} (83.49 sq mi)

Population (2022)
  - Total: 167,425
  - Density: 774.26/km^{2} (2,005.3/sq mi)
- Time zone: UTC+6 (BST)
- Postal code: 1860
- Area code: 0651
- Website: Official Map of Daulatpur

Daulatpur (Bengali: দৌলতপুর) is an upazila of Manikganj District in Dhaka Division, Bangladesh.

== Geography ==
Daulatpur Upazila (manikganj district|) area 216.24 km^{2}, located in between 23°54' and 24°02' north latitudes and in between 89°41' and 89°57' east longitudes. It is bounded by Chauhali and Nagarpur upazilas on the north, Shivalaya and Ghior upazilas on the south, Saturia Upazila on the east, Bera Upazila and Jamuna River on the west.

Main rivers are Jamuna, Dhaleshwari and Ichamati and canals like Gaighata canal and Khalsi beel

== Demographics ==
Religions in Daulatpur Upazila (2022)
Religion	Percent
Islam	95.11%
Hinduism	4.88%
Other or not stated	0.01%

According to the 2022 Bangladeshi census, Daulatpur Upazila had 42,430 households and a population of 167,425. 8.80% of the population were under 5 years of age. Daulatpur had a literacy rate (age 7 and over) of 61.13%: 65.61% for males and 56.96% for females, and a sex ratio of 94.59 males for every 100 females. 18,851 (11.26%) lived in urban areas.

According to the 2011 Census of Bangladesh, Daulatpur Upazila had 38,786 households and a population of 167,026. 43,487 (26.04%) were under 10 years of age. Daulatpur had a literacy rate (age 7 and over) of 34.88%, compared to the national average of 51.8%, and a sex ratio of 1,075 females per 1,000 males. 6,918 (4.14%) lived in urban areas.

According to the 2001 census, the total population in the area is 155674; 78,557 males, 77,117 females; 146,834 Muslims, 8,814 Hindus, 20 Buddhist and 6 believers of other faiths and males constituted 49.62% of the population, and females constituted 50.38%. Average literacy rate of Daulatpur upazila people is 28.37%; male 34.71%, female 22.01%.

== Administration ==
Daulatpur Thana was formed in 1919 and it was turned into an upazila in 1983.

Daulatpur Upazila is divided into eight union parishads: Bachamara, Baghutia, Chakmirpur, Charkataree, Dhamswar, Khalshi, Klia, and Zionpur. The union parishads are subdivided into 172 mauzas and 188 villages.

== Education ==
Educational institutions: college 3, secondary school 21, primary school 158, madrasa 29. Noted educational institutions: Taluknagar College (1972), Daulatpur Matilal College (1972), Bachamara College (1972), Daulatpur Pilot High School (1949), Bachamara High School (1950), Kalia High School (1964), Baghutia High School (1964), Taluknagar High School (1965), Charkatari Sabuj Sena High School (1966), Charmastul High School (1969), Kakna High School (1967), Khalsi High School (1968).

== See also ==
- Upazilas of Bangladesh
- Districts of Bangladesh
- Divisions of Bangladesh
- Administrative geography of Bangladesh
