= R. P. Shaha University =

- Other name: RPSU
- Motto: Ever to Excel
- Type: University
- Established: 2013
- Accreditation: PCB, Bar Council
- Affiliations: University Grants Commission
- Chancellor: President Mirza Fakhrul Islam Alamgir
- Vice-Chancellor: Manindra Kumar Roy
- Faculty: 100 (2025)
- Students: 4000 (2025)
- Location: 25, Sultan Giasuddin Road, Shitalakhya, Narayanganj, Narayanganj, Bangladesh; 23.6015°N 90.4972°E
- Campus: Urban
- Website: www.rpsu.ac.bd

R. P. Shaha University (Bengali: আর. পি. সাহা বিশ্ববিদ্যালয়), also known as (RPSU), is a private university in Narayanganj, Bangladesh. It is the first private university in Narayanganj officially recognized by the University Grants Commission of Bangladesh. RPSU is a coeducational institution and offers courses and programs leading to degrees in several areas of study. It was established in 2013 under the Private University Act, 2010.

== Location ==
The campus is at 25, Sultan Giasuddin Road, Shitalakya, Narayanganj-1400. RPSU has 8 laboratories for pharmacy, 2 computer laboratories, 5 CSE / EEE laboratories, 1 textile laboratory, and 1 fashion design laboratory. The university's campus is located in the riverside area at Shitalakhya in Narayanganj. The foundation of the campus was laid on 1 November 2022 by Rajiv Prasad Shaha, Chairman of RPSU. Classes started in the permanent (current) campus on 1 February 2024. The campus can serve up to 4,000 students with amenities and facilities. It contains 3 buildings on nine acres of land, having 53,000 square feet of floor space.

== History ==
R. P. Shaha University (RPSU) is a unit of Kumudini Welfare Trust of Bengal Ltd. It got approval from the Ministry of Education on 14 March 2012 and from the UGC on 21 March 2012. Classes started in 2014. The university is named after Ranada Prasad Shaha, a famous philanthropist and businessman who was killed during the liberation war of Bangladesh in 1971.

=== List of vice-chancellors ===
- Amal Krishna Halder (2014 – 2015)
- Manindra Kumar Roy (2016 – present)

== Academic departments ==
The university's departments are organized into five schools.

School of Business Administration (SBA)

- Department of Finance
- Department of Business Administration

RPSU Business School is in the process of obtaining accreditation from the Accreditation Council for Business Schools and Programs (ACBSP).

School of Engineering (SE)

- Department of Computer Science and Engineering
- Department of Electrical and Computer Engineering

School of Arts & Social Sciences (SASS)

- Department of English
- Department of Law
- Department of Fashion & Design

School of Life Sciences & Health (SLSH)

- Department of Pharmacy

Kumudini School of Public Health (KSPH)

- Department of Public Health

== Library ==
The RPSU library has over 2,000 square feet of floor area on the north side of the campus. The library holds 6500 books, 10,000 online books, 1000 journals, magazines, and other resources. The university publishes a journal called RPSU Journals.

== Institutes ==
RPSU has two institutes and one centre.

B P Shaha International Language & Cultural Institute: B. P. Shaha International Language & Cultural Institute is an educational institute established on 11 June 2024. The institute offers courses in multiple languages, including Japanese, English, and Chinese, with the aim of promoting international communication, cultural exchange, and language proficiency.

Kumudini Skill Development Institute: The Kumudini Skill Development Institute (KSDI) was established on 11 June 2024 with the aim of enhancing professional and technical skills among students and professionals. The institute offers a variety of short courses and diploma programs designed to meet the demands of modern industries and emerging job markets. The courses cover diverse fields, including digital marketing, statistical package for the social sciences (SPSS), cybersecurity, etc.

The Centre for Research and Innovation is dedicated to fostering a research culture at the university. Established to support multidisciplinary research, the centre provides funding and resources to facilitate cutting-edge projects.
