= Manikganj District =

District in Bangladesh

Manikganj District মানিকগঞ্জ জেলা
- District of Bangladesh
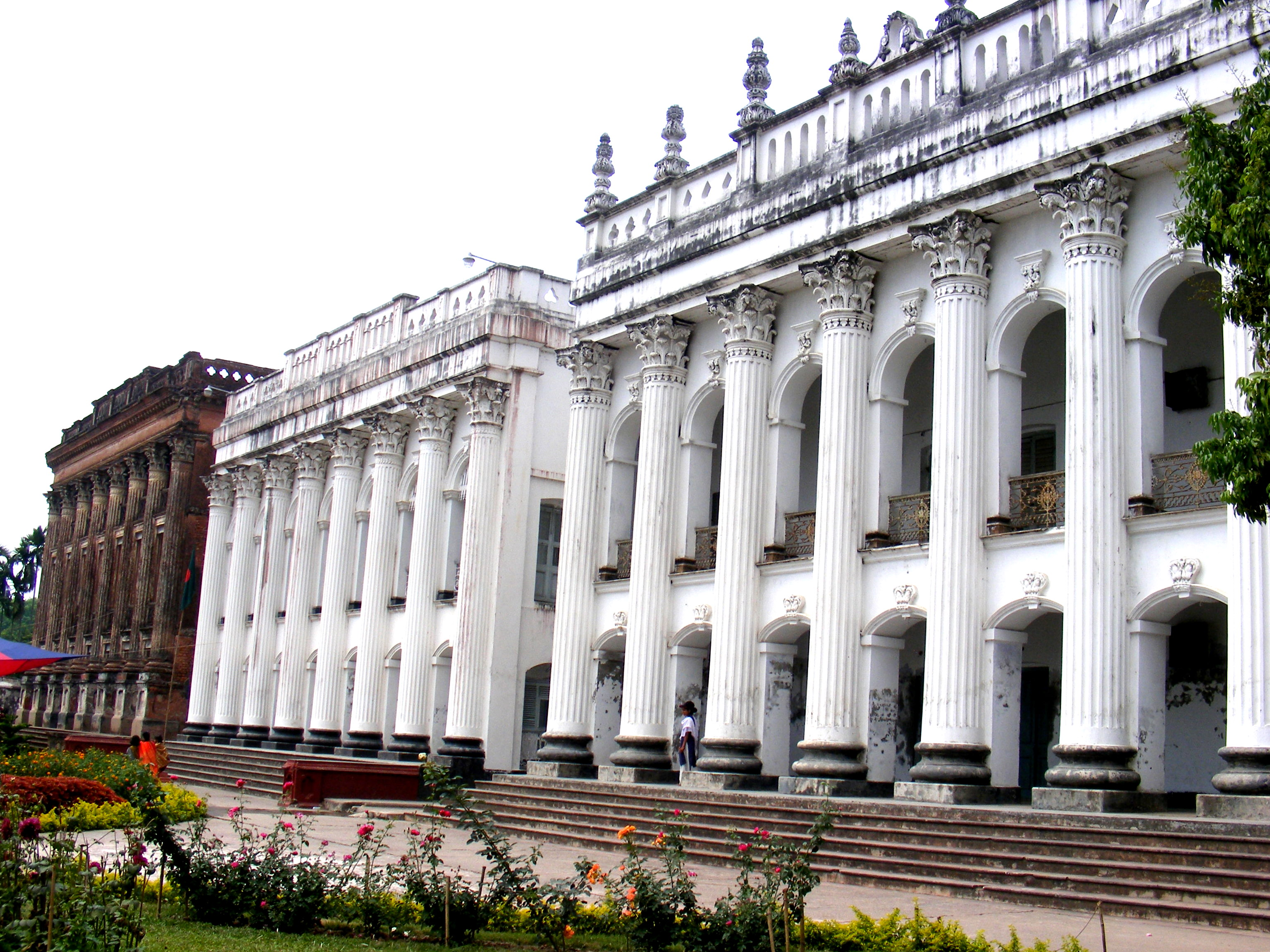
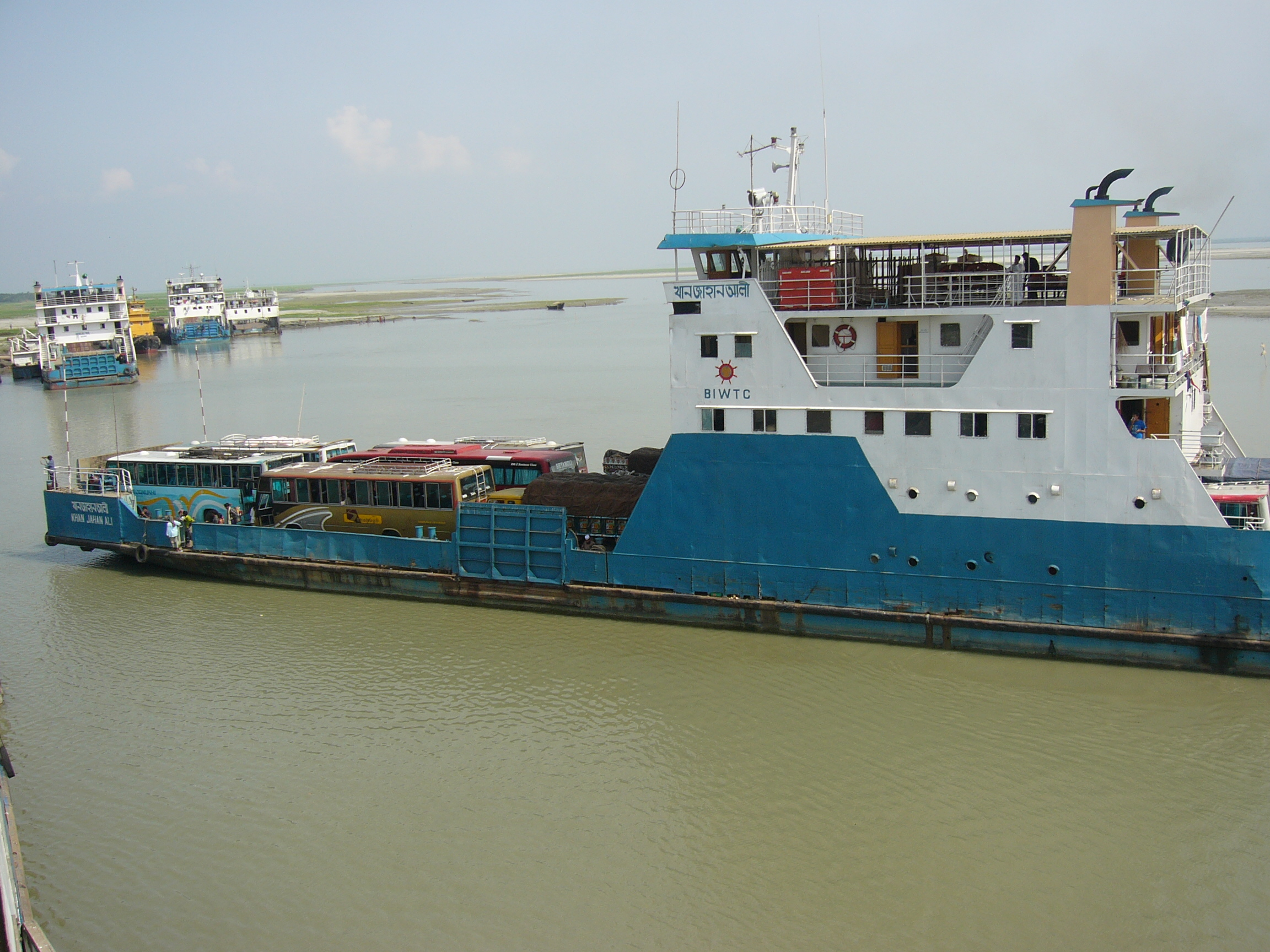
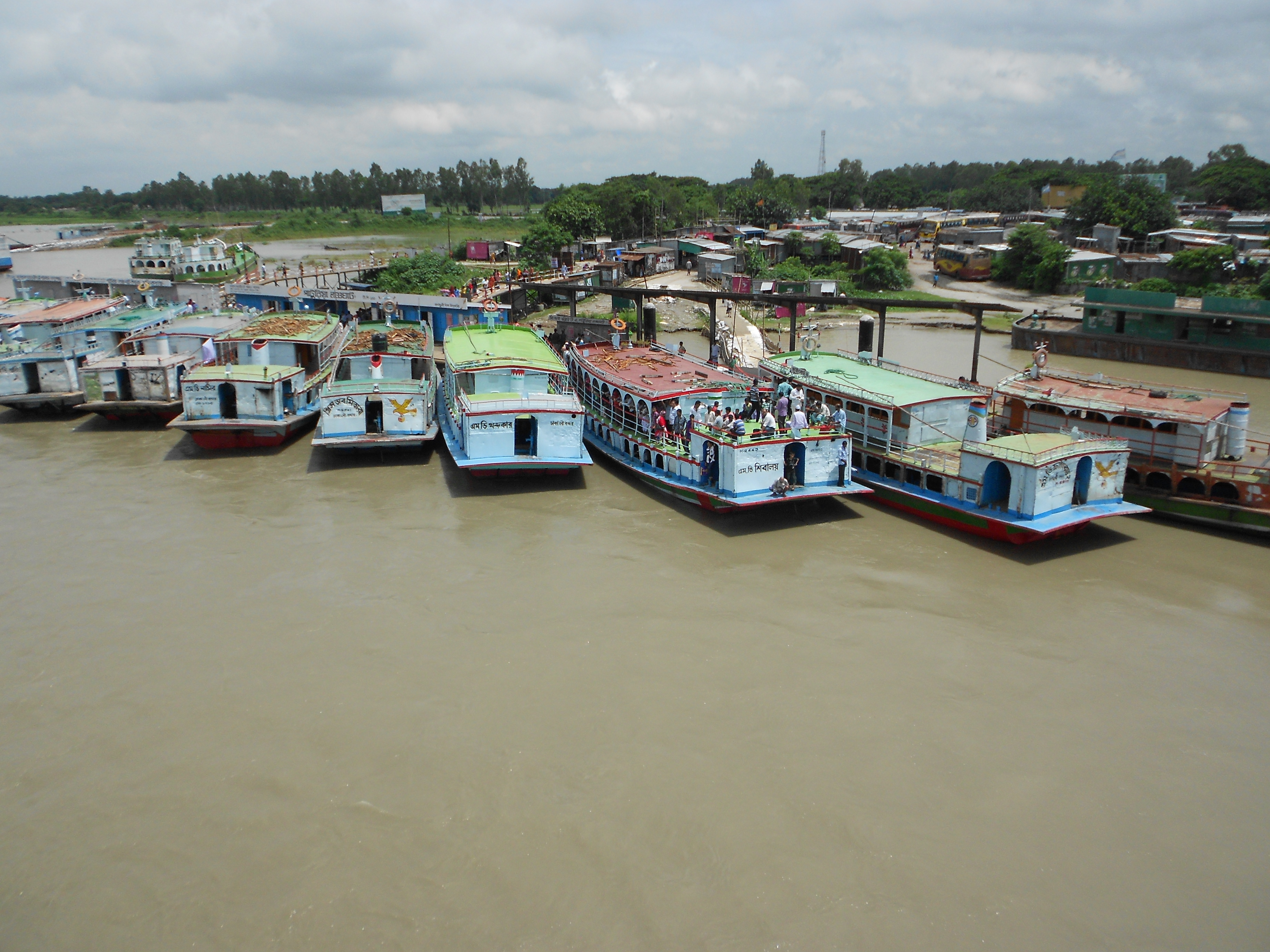
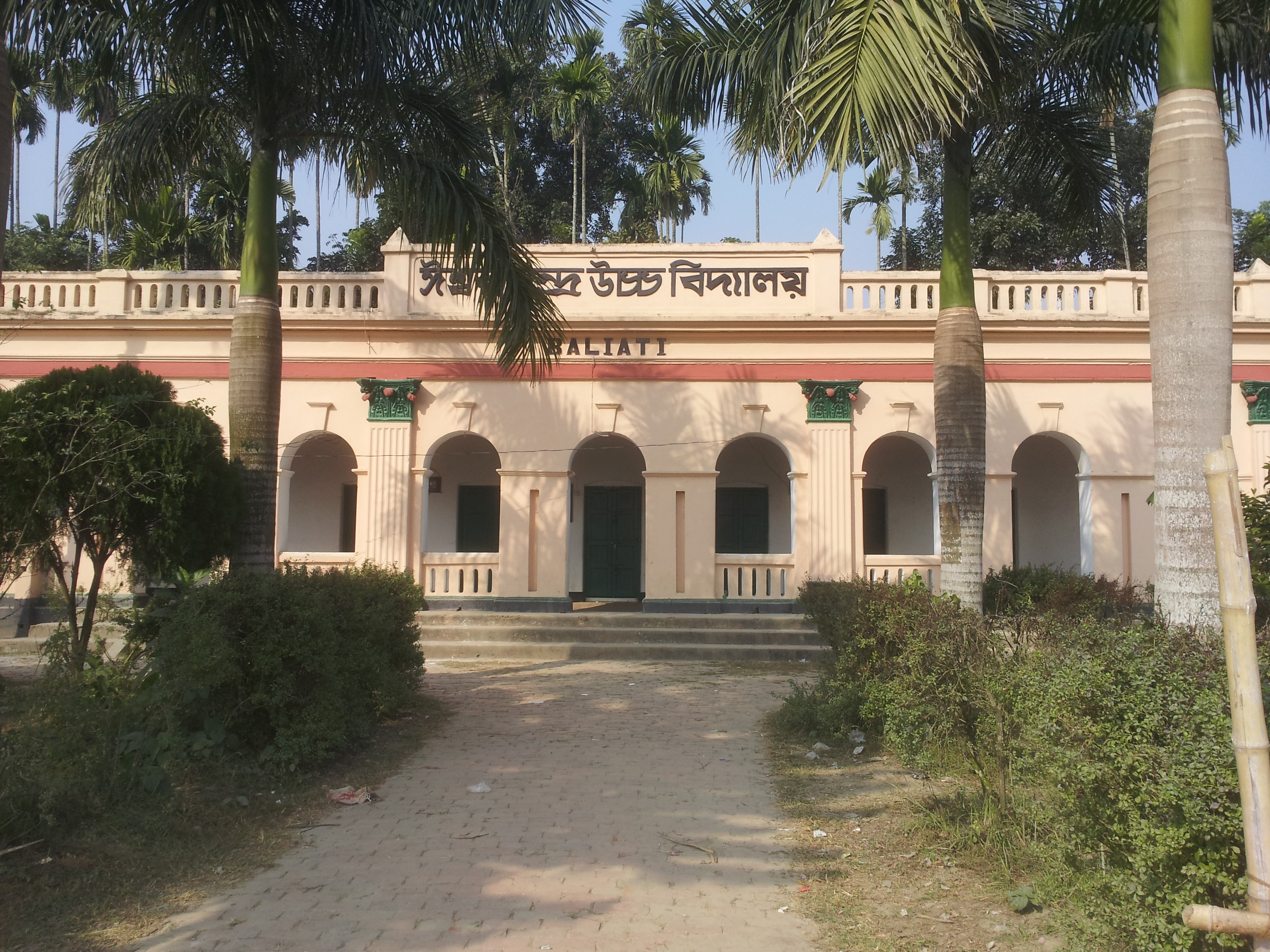
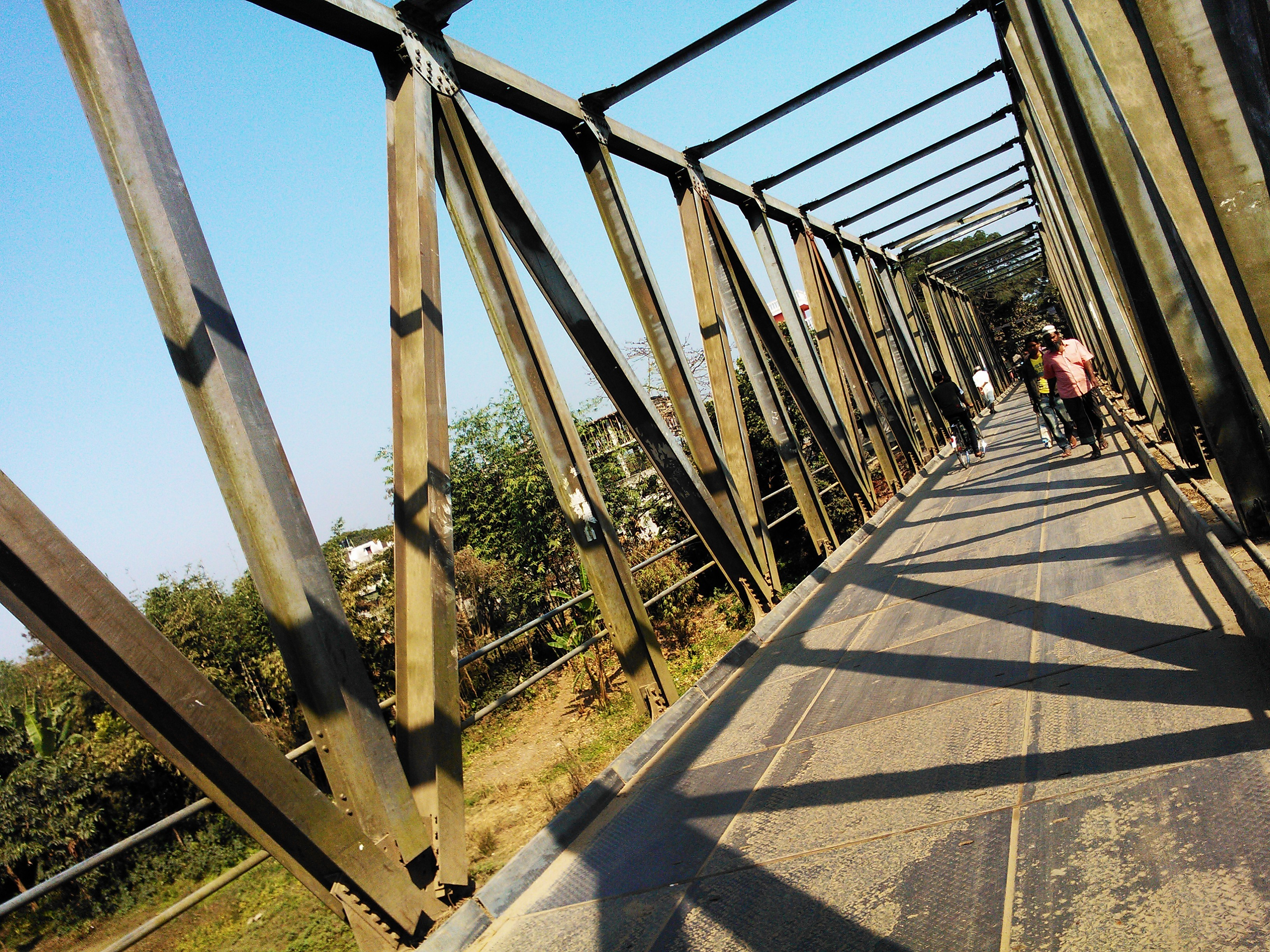
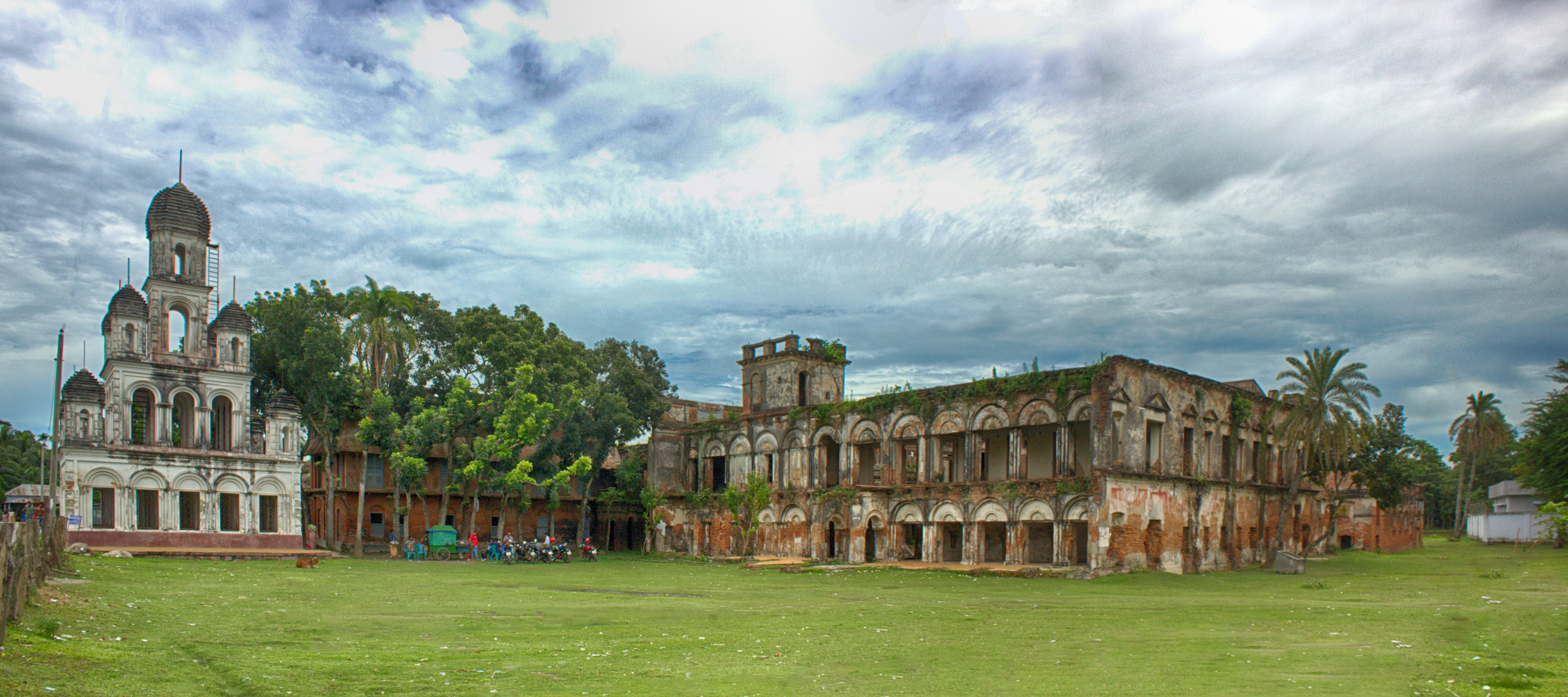
- Left to right from top: Baliati Royal Palace, Saturia, Manikganj‌; Aricha Ghat; Paturia Ferry Ghat; Ishwar chandra high school; Bailey bridge; Teota Jomidar Bari and Navaratna Temple in the left corner

- Location of Manikganj District in Bangladesh
- Interactive map of Manikganj District
- Coordinates: 23.86°N 90.00°E
- Country: Bangladesh
- Division: Dhaka
- Established: 1 March 1984
- Headquarters: Manikganj

Government
  - Deputy Commissioner: Nazmun Ara Sultana

Area
  - Total: 1,383.66 km^{2} (534.23 sq mi)

Population (2022)
  - Total: 1,558,025
  - Density: 1,126.02/km^{2} (2,916.37/sq mi)
- Time zone: UTC+06:00 (BST)
- Postal code: 1800
- Area code: 0651
- ISO 3166 code: BD-33
- HDI (2018): 0.596 medium · 11th of 21
- Website: www.manikganj.gov.bd

Manikganj District (Bengali: মানিকগঞ্জ জেলা, romanized: Mānikgoñj Jela; Bengali pronunciation: [mɑnɪkˈɡondʒ]) is a district in central Bangladesh and a part of the Dhaka Division. It was established in 1845 as a subdivision of Faridpur District. In 1853, it was transferred to Dhaka District for administrative purposes. Manikganj was declared a full district in 1984.

== History ==
Manikganj subdivision was established in 1845. It was transferred from Faridpur District to Dhaka District in 1853. In 1984, Manikganj subdivision was promoted to a full district.

=== War of Liberation ===
The liberation war in 1971 in Manikganj District was organized and led by Abdul Halim Chowdhury, Abdul Matin Chowdhury, Principal Abdur Rouf Khan, and other leaders.

On 29 October 1971, at the northwest corner of Golaidanga village, the Baldhara union (a group of freedom fighters) in Singair Upazila attacked boats carrying Pakistani troops, which was followed by a battle taking place on the Nuruni Ganga (canal of Kaliganga river). 81 Pakistani soldiers were killed, and many others were injured. The operation was led by Tobarak Hossain Ludu, commander of the Mukti Bahini Lodu group. There were no casualties inflicted upon the Mukti Bahini.

After this short-duration battle, the Mukti Bahini left the battlefield, while the Pakistani ranks were reinforced with more soldiers. They burnt 160 houses surrounding the area of Golaidanga village, and killed 9 local people, who were primarily elderly and staying at home. Some of the local youth assisted the freedom fighters in that ambush.

After the Golaidanga fight, Singair Upazila became free from Pakistani occupation on 13 November 1971. In the last week of November 1971, fresh groups of freedom fighters entered different areas of Manikganj and defeated Pakistani troops in a number of battles.

On 14 December 1971, a group of Pakistan soldiers moving towards Dhaka entered Barundi village in Manikganj Sadar Upazila. Meanwhile, a group of liberation forces (Mujib Bahini) under the leadership of Shahadat Hossain Biswas Badal was preparing to attack them within the place. Understanding this, the Pakistani soldiers immediately left the village, leaving 2 soldiers behind. One of them was arrested by the liberation forces at night on 14 December 1971. The other soldier was arrested by the same group after a small fight the next day. The sub-division was declared free on 13 December.

=== Daulatpur–Saturia tornado ===
On 26 April 1989, Manikganj was the site of the Daulatpur–Saturia tornado, which became the deadliest tornado in recorded history. 1,300 people were initially reported as having been killed, with 12,000 injured. The towns of Saturia and Manikganj were leveled, and about 80,000 people were made homeless.

== Geography ==
Manikganj comprises an area of 1,383.66 km^{2} (534.23 sq mi). Annual average temperatures reach a maximum of 36 °C and a minimum to 12.7 °C with the total annual rainfall being 2,376 mm (93.5 in).

There are several rivers in the Manikganj District, including the Padma River, Kaliganga River, Jamuna River, Dhaleshwari River, and Ichamati River.

== Demographics ==
Historical population
Year	Pop.	±% p.a.
1981	1,063,048	—
1991	1,175,909	+1.01%
2001	1,285,080	+0.89%
2011	1,392,867	+0.81%
2022	1,558,025	+1.02%

According to the 2022 Census of Bangladesh, Manikganj District had 393,524 households and a population of 1,558,025 with an average 3.91 people per household. Among the population, 259,616 (16.66%) inhabitants were under 10 years old. The population density was 1,126 people per km^{2}. Manikganj District had a literacy rate (age 7 and over) of 71.17%, compared to the national average of 74.80%, and a sex ratio of 1072 females per 1000 males. Approximately, 14.74% of the population lived in urban areas. The ethnic population was 909.

=== Religion ===
Religion in Manikganj District (2022)
Religion	Percent
Islam	91.04%
Hinduism	8.91%
Other or not stated	0.05%

Manikganj District has 3,575 mosques, 160 temples, 10 churches, 5 Buddhist temples, and a pagoda. The Hindu population had fallen from nearly 150,000 in 1981 to 130,000 in 2011, but increased to 139,000 in 2022.

Religion in present-day Manikganj District
Religion	1941 (Note: 1941 figures are for Manikganj subdivision of erstwhile Dhaka district, which roughly corresponds to the present district. District and upazila borders have shifted slightly since then.)		1981		1991		2001		2011		2022	
Religion	Pop.	%	Pop.	%	Pop.	%	Pop.	%	Pop.	%	Pop.	%
Islam	419,287	67.84%	914,748	86.05%	1,028,283	87.45%	1,155,202	89.89%	1,262,215	90.62%	1,418,263	91.04%
Hinduism	198,665	32.15%	147,860	13.91%	145,893	12.41%	129,488	10.08%	130,095	9.34%	138,867	8.91%
Other (Note: Including Jainism, Christianity, Buddhism, Zoroastrianism, Judaism, Ad-Dharmis, or not stated)	73	0.01%	440	0.04%	1,733	0.14%	390	0.03%	557	0.04%	895	0.05%
Total Population	618,025	100%	1,063,048	100%	1,175,909	100%	1,285,080	100%	1,392,867	100%	1,558,025	100%

== Economy ==
There are total 166 haats and bazars in the district, including:

- Baira Bazar
- Bahadia Bazar
- Bangala Bazar
- Barangail Bazar
- Butni Bazar
- Diabari Bazar
- Gilonda Bazar
- Gheor Bazar
- Ghosher Bazar
- Ghosta Bazar
- Intazganj Bazar
- Jamsha Bazar
- Jhitka Bazar
- Maluchi Bazar (Balla Bazar)
- Mohadebpur Bazar
- Sakrail Bazar
- Singair Bazar

In addition, 54 fairs (Mela) are held in Manikganj, including:

- Afaz Paglar Mela (Bathaimuri)
- Aziz paglar Mela (Kachidhara)
- Bahadia Boishakhi Mela (Bahadia)
- Baher Paglar Mela (Bangala)
- Baher Paglar Mela (Mohadebpur)
- Baruni Mela (Butni)
- Belal/Billal Paglar Mela (Harganj)
- Joymontop Modhor Mela (Joymontop)
- Kanu Promaniker Mela (Manta, Manikganj Sadar)
- Majhi Barir Mela (Diabari)
- Manikganj Bijoy Mela (Manikganj)
- Poush Mela (Atigram)
- Rowth Jatra Mela (Katigram)
- Sadur Mela (Singair)
- Sadhur Mela (South Jamsha)
- Sadhinota Mela (Maluchi)
- Sonatoni Nobo Torun jubo Songgho Soroswati puja (Katigram)
- Zinda Shah Mela (Jhitka)
- Garpara Imam Bari Muharramer Mela (Garpara, Manikganj Sadar)
- Garpara Buripujor Mela (Garpara, Manikganj Sadar)

== Places of interest ==
- Baliati Zamindari Home, Saturia
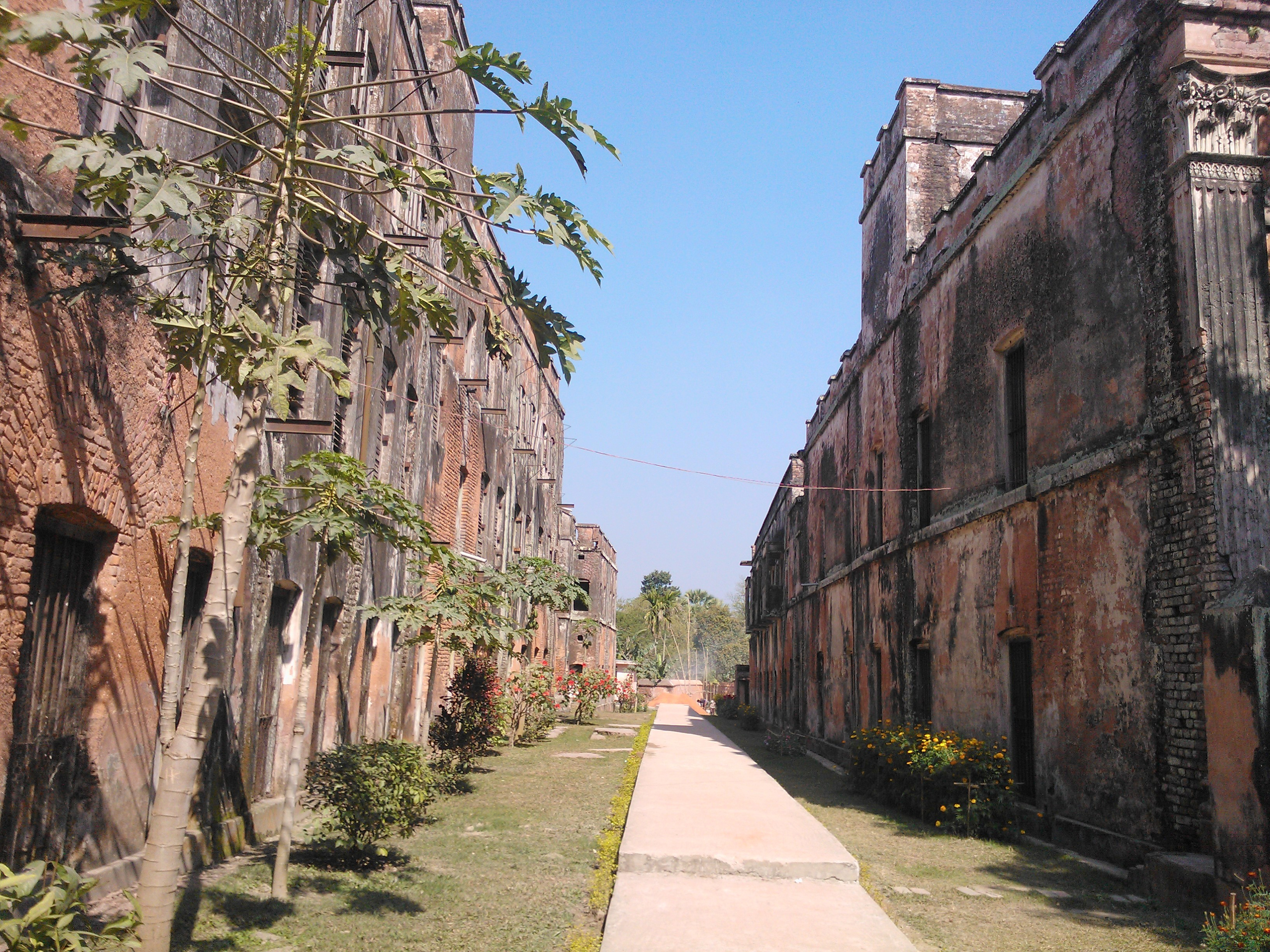
Baliati Palace

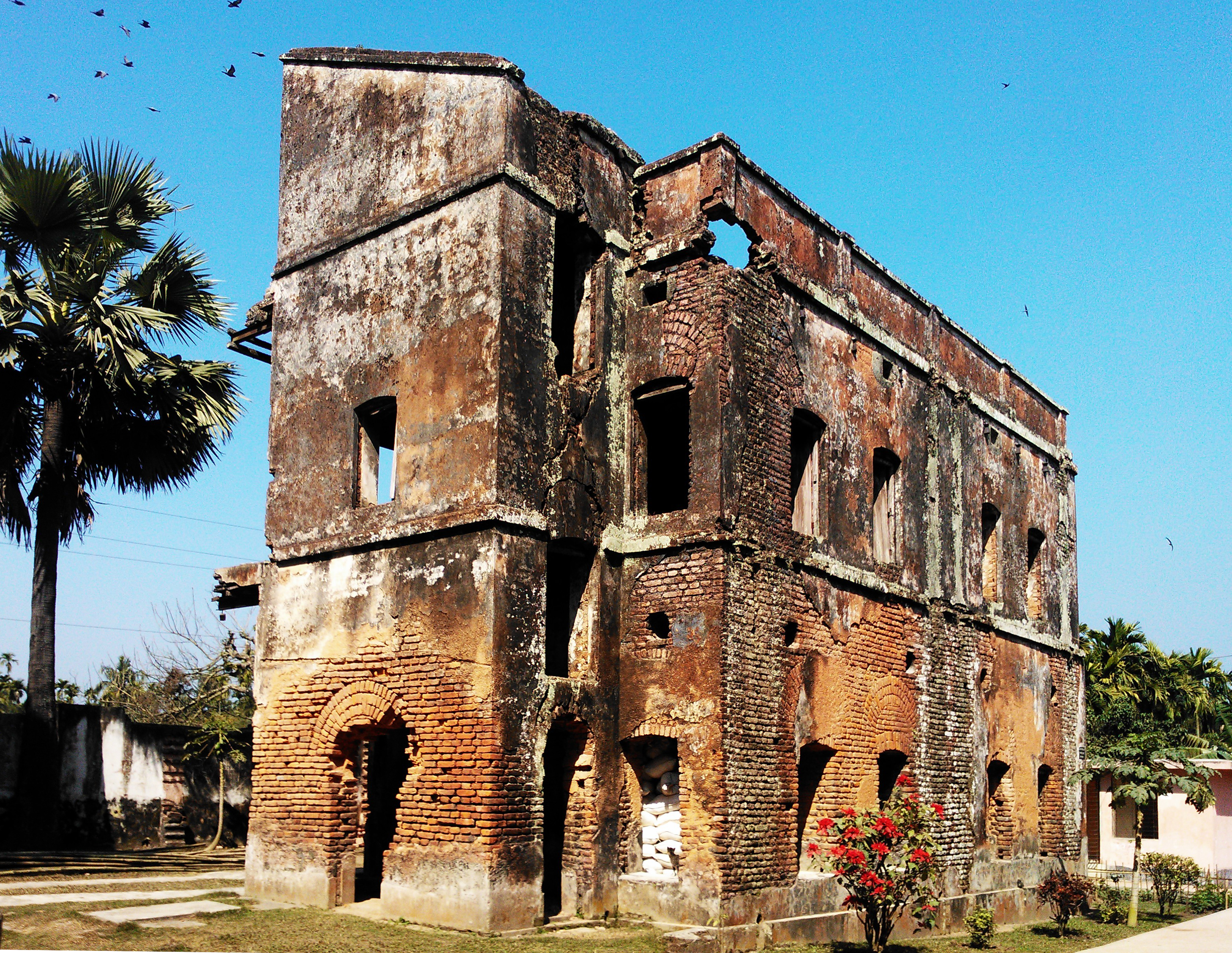
Baliati Palace

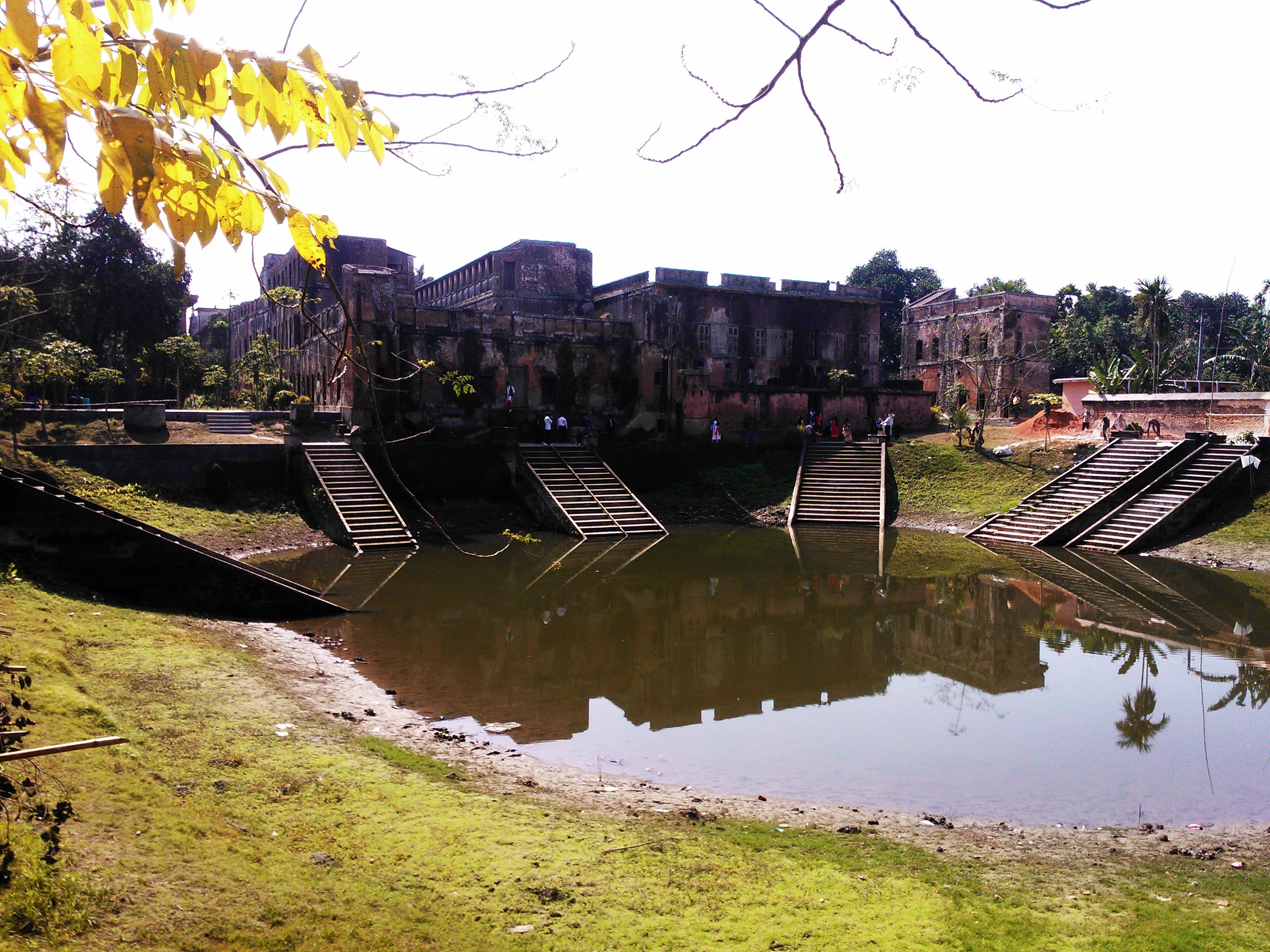
Baliati Palace - backside
- Padmar Par, Harirampur
- Teota Jamindar Bari, Shivalaya upazila
- Taota Noboratna Modh, Shibalaya
- Narayan Sadhur Asrom
- Historical Shrine and Mosque of Machaine Village
- Kabiraj Bari
- Beutha Bridge
- Betila Palace
- Betila Mondir

== Subdivisions ==
Manikganj District upazila geocode map

The district's upazilas are:

- Daulatpur Upazila
- Ghior Upazila
- Harirampur Upazila
- Manikganj Sadar Upazila
- Saturia Upazila
- Singair Upazila
- Shivalaya Upazila

== Education ==
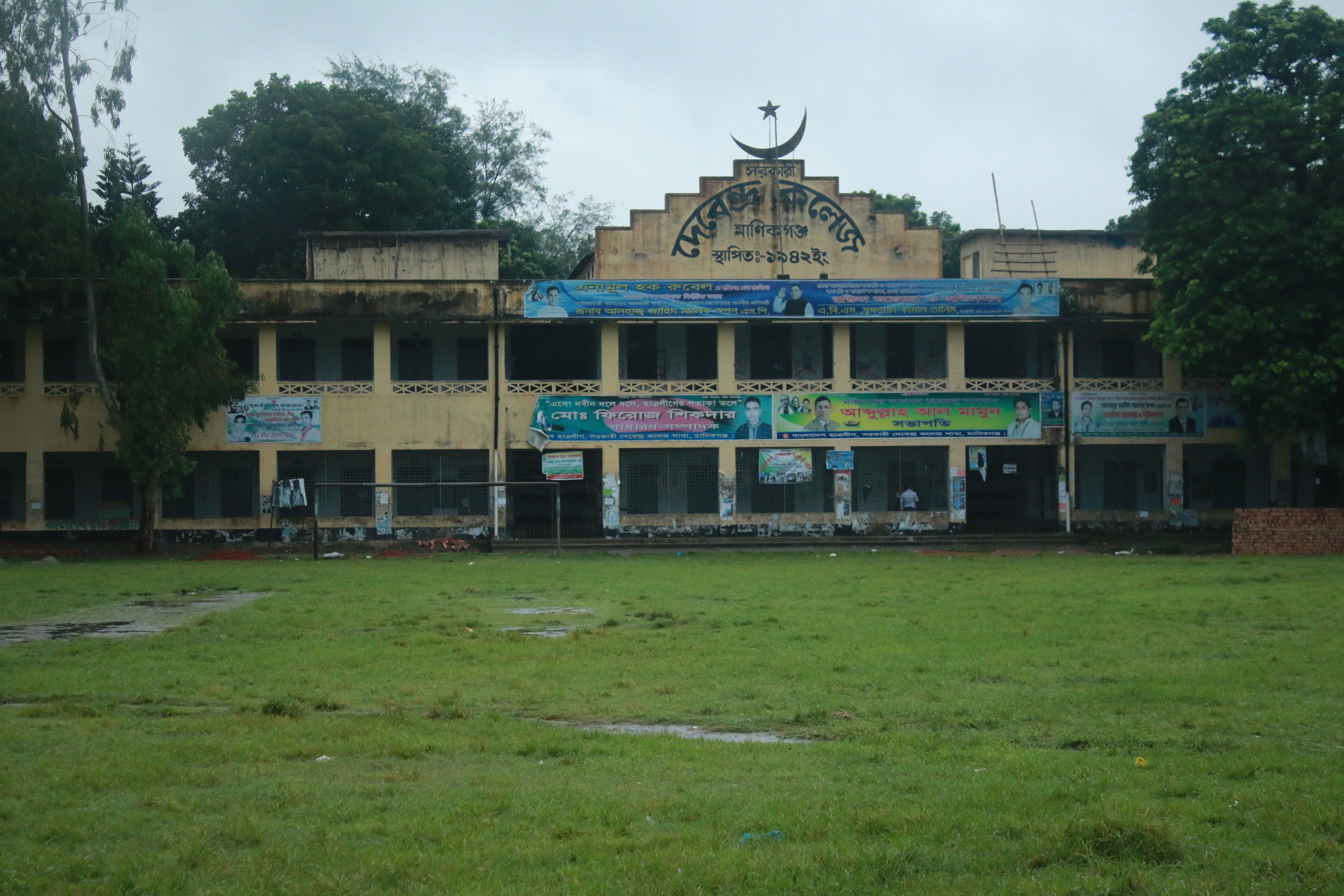
Government Debendra College, Manikgonj

There are 27 colleges in the district, including Government Debendra College, which was founded in 1942, and the private NPI University of Bangladesh, which was founded in 2016. There is one medical school: Colonel Malek Medical College.

According to Banglapedia, notable secondary schools in the district include:

- Baliati Iswar Chandra High School (founded 1919)
- Bajpara High School (1995)
- Barangail Gopal Chandra High School (1924)
- Dhankora Girish Institution (1917)
- Diabari High School
- Dhulla B. M. High School (1920)
- Ghior D. N. Pilot High School (1929)
- Hatipara High School
- Ibrahimpur Iswar Chandra High School (1923)
- Jamirtta S. G. High School (1921)
- Jhitka Ananda Mohan High School (1926)
- Joymontop High School (1921)
- Kellai Monsur Uddin ML High School (1956)
- Lemubari Binoda Sundori High School (1949)
- Manikganj Government High School (1884)
- Manikganj Model High School (1925)
- Muljan High School (1978)
- Nali Bararia Krishna Chandra High School (1915)
- Patgram Anath Bandhu Government High School (1915)
- Teota Academy (1891)
- Terosree K. N. Institution (1922)
- Manikganj Technical School & collage
- Ghosta DM High School

The madrasa education system includes two fazil madrasas and one kamil madrasa—Manikganj Islamia Kamil Madrasa, founded in 1953.

The technical education system includes the Government Textile Vocational Institute Manikganj.

== Notable people ==
- Khan Bahadur Abdul Hakim CIE (1905-1985), mathematician and former President of the Asiatic Society
- Khan Asifur Rahman Agun – singer
- Begum Badrunnessa Ahmed – politician and social worker; raised by the zamindar of Paril
- Naib Uddin Ahmed – photographer; born in Paril village in 1925
- Rafiq Uddin Ahmed – Bengali language movement martyr; born in Paril village in 1926
- Mir Quasem Ali – convicted war criminal; born in Munshidangi village in 1952
- Momtaz Begum – singer and politician; elected to Parliament from constituency Manikganj-2
- Amalendu Biswas – stage actor; lived in Jabar village
- Aruna Biswas – television and film actress; calls Manikganj her hometown
- Parbati Sankar Roy Choudhury – zamindar; administered his family's estates from Teota
- Abdul Halim Chowdhury – politician; born in Elachipur village in 1928
- Bulbul Chowdhury – dancer; attended Manikganj High School
- Munier Choudhury – educator, dramatist, and literary critic; born in Manikganj in 1925
- Hemanta Kumari Debi – Zamindar; born in Dhulla village in 1869
- Sumita Devi – actress; born in Manikganj district in 1936
- Nina Hamid – folk singer
- Khandaker Delwar Hossain – politician; elected to Parliament from constituency Manikganj-1
- Khandkar Manwar Hossain – statistician
- A. K. M. Nurul Islam – former Vice President of Bangladesh (1986–1989); buried in Harirampur
- Mohammad Kaykobad – computer scientist; graduated from Manikganj Government High School and Debendra College
- Mohammad Ali Reza Khan – ornithologist; graduated from Manikganj Debendranath College
- Mubarak Ahmad Khan – scientist
- Muhammad Siddiq Khan – librarian; former principal of Manikganj Debendra College
- Shamsul Islam Khan – former Minister of Industry (1991–1996); elected to Parliament from constituency Manikganj-4
- Shamsuzzaman Khan – academician and folklorist; born in Manikganj district
- Zahid Maleque – former Minister of Health and Family Welfare; elected to Parliament from constituency Manikganj-3
- Tareque Masud – film director and producer; died in a crash on the N5 highway at Joka
- Harunur Rashid Khan Monno – industrialist and former member of parliament (1991–1996)
- Mishuk Munier – journalist; died in a crash on the N5 highway at Joka
- Khan Ataur Rahman – actor, filmmaker, and composer; born in Ramkantapur village in 1928
- Naimur Rahman Durjoy – cricketer and politician; born in Manikganj in 1974
- Kaniz Fatema Roksana – first Bangladeshi woman pilot
- Kiran Chandra Roy – folk singer; attended Patgram Anath Bandhu High School and Manikganj Debendra College
- Ranadaprasad Saha – businessman; established Debendra College in 1942
- Dinesh Chandra Sen – educator, writer, and folklorist; born in Bogjuri village in 1866
- Hiralal Sen – filmmaker; born in Bogjuri village in 1866
- Amartya Sen – economist; made a few visits to his ancestral home (from his mother's side) in Manikganj
- Kiran Shankar Roy - politician, freedom fighter, academic, and barrister
- Abdul Latif Biswas - lawyer and politician

== See also ==
- Districts of Bangladesh
