= Betila Zamindar Bari =

- Interactive map of Betila Zamindar Bari
- Location: Betila, Manikganj

Betila Jomidarbari (Bengali: বেতিলা জমিদারবাড়ি, Betilā Jomidārbāṛi) is a Zamidari residence in Betila, Manikganj District, Bangladesh.

== History ==
Due to a lack of documented records, the precise history of this residence remains largely unknown. In the past, various bojaras (large traditional boats) and merchant vessels used the Betila Canal in Manikganj District for navigation. Many prominent traders chose this safe waterway for transportation. According to local folklore, a merchant named Jyoti Babu is believed to have been an ancestor of the family that established this zamindar house.

== Present Condition ==
The Betila Zamindar Bari, popularly known as Satu Babu’s residence, is currently being used as a government shelter center.
