= Patgram Anath Bandhu Government High School =

Coordinates: 23.7409°N 89.9707°E

Patgram Anath Bandhu Government High School (Bengali: পাটগ্রাম অনাথ বন্ধু সরকারী উচ্চ বিদ্যালয়) is a secondary school in Harirampur Upazila, in the division of Dhaka, Bangladesh. It was established on 2 January 1915 by the Niogi family. The Niogi family was the most educated family in Harina, a location since flooded by the Padma River. The school was a minor school from 1915 to 1925, when the process of becoming a state school started. In the time of Hussain Muhammad Ershad the school became the first government school in Harirampur.

Alumni of the school include the AKM Miraz Uddin, educationist and scholar Khan Bahadur Abdul Hakim, dramatist Maznun Mizan and singer Kiran Chandra Roy.
