= Baliati Iswar Chandra High School =

Secondary school in Saturia Upazila, Bangladesh

Coordinates: 23.9928°N 90.0402°E

- Bengali: বালিয়াটি ঈশ্বর চন্দ্র উচ্চ বিদ্যালয়
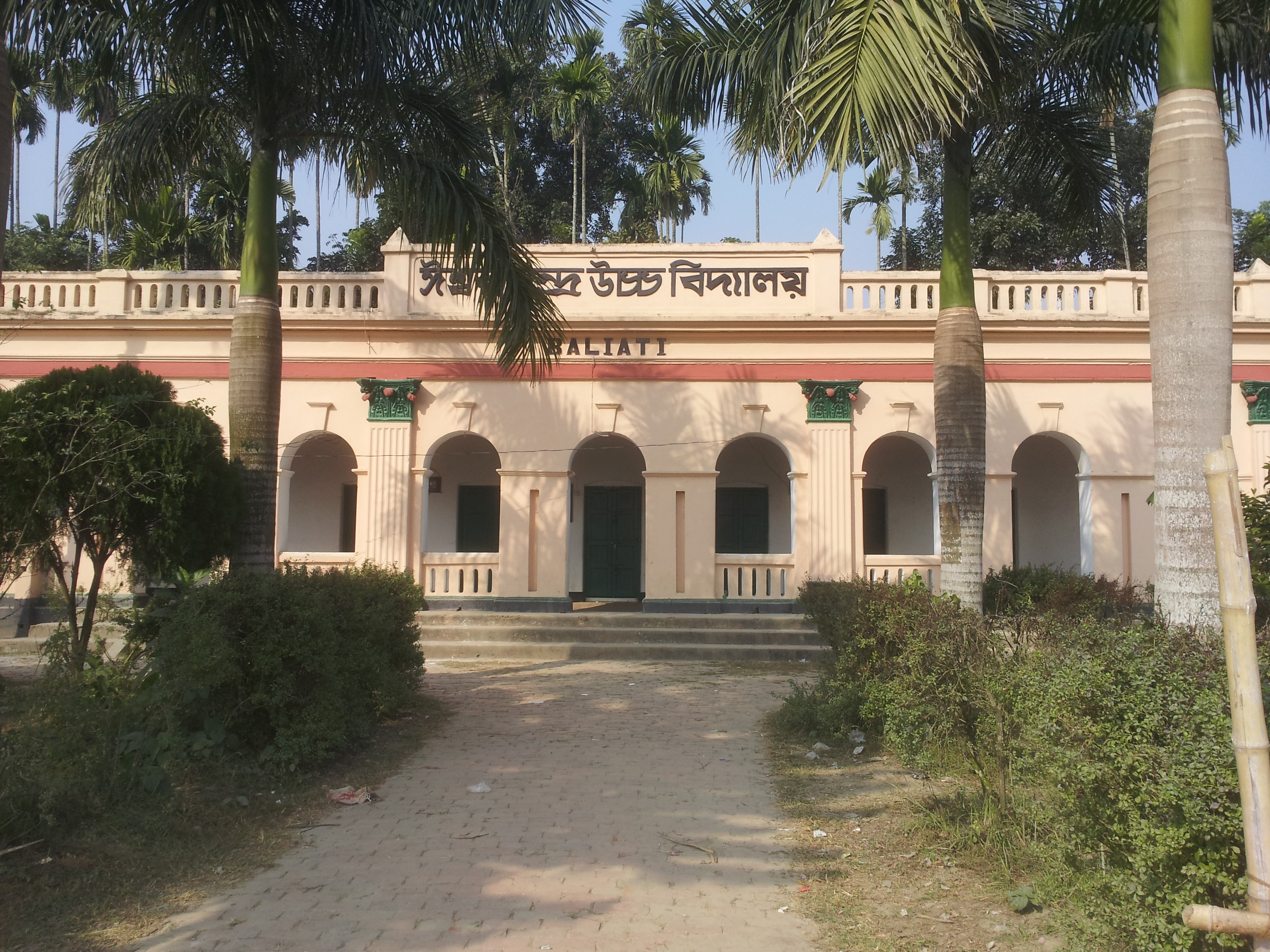

Information
- Established: 1919; 106 years ago
- Founder: Babu Ray Bahadur Harendra Kumar Ray Chowdhury

Baliati Iswar Chandra High School (Bengali: বালিয়াটি ঈশ্বর চন্দ্র উচ্চ বিদ্যালয়) is a secondary school in Saturia Upazila, Manikganj District, Bangladesh, established in 1919. It is situated on six acres of land with two academic buildings, nine ponds, one helipad, and one play ground.

== History ==
The founder of the school is Babu Ray Bahadur Harendra Kumar Ray Chowdhury, who was the zamindar of the area. He founded the school in the name of his father (Iswar Chandra) and to fulfill his son Upel Chandra's wish.

Upel Chandra was a barrister who studied in London. After completing his degree, he wanted to establish a school in Saturia Upazila to provide education for the area. He asked his father to construct the school but his father did not agree with the proposal. Due to the rejection by his father of the proposal, Upel Chandra committed suicide. Only then did Babu Ray Bahadur Harendra Kumar Ray Chowdhuri establish the school and dedicate it to his son.

The school started its journey as an English medium school. The first head master was an Englishman. It was recognized by the University of Calcutta in 1921.
