= Kanchanpur Union, Manikganj =

Coordinates: 23.756°N 89.883°E

Kanchanpur Union (Bengali: কাঞ্চনপুর ইউনিয়ন) is a union parishad under Harirampur Upazila of Manikganj District in the Dhaka Division of central Bangladesh.

== Geography ==
Kanchanpur is situated on the east bank of the Padma River.

== Demographics ==
According to the 2011 Bangladesh census, Kanchanpur Union had 1,284 households and a population of 5,271. The literacy rate (age 7 and over) was 36.4%, compared to the national average of 51.8%. 93.8% of the employed population was engaged in agricultural work.
