= Nina Hamid =

Bangladeshi folk singer

Nina Hamid নীনা হামিদ
- Born: Manikganj, Bangladesh
- Genres: Folk
- Occupation: Singer

Nina Hamid is a Bangladeshi folk singer. She is notable for the song "Amar Sonar Moyna Pakhi". She was awarded Ekushey Padak in 1994 by the government of Bangladesh.

== Early life ==
Hamid was born to Abu Mohammad Abdullah Khan and Sofrun Nessa. Nina Hamid's ancestral home is in Naoda village of Manikganj District.Her father was a police officer.

== Personal life ==
Hamid is married to modern singer MA Hamid. Dancer Farhana Chowdhury is Hamid's niece.

== Works ==
Hamid is a Bangla Folk Music singer, primarily known for her renditions of songs composed by Bangladesh's folk-poet Jasim Uddin. Hamid's songs mainly depict the sadness, sorrows, pathos of village women. Among the most widely known of her works are "Amar Sonar Moina Pakhi", "Ujaan Ganger Naiyiaa", "Nao Ano Re Bhai", "Jogi Vikkha Loina", "Jare ja Chithi", "Amar Golar har Khule ne Na O Go Lolite", the latter being a prominent example of a bicched (living-apart) folk song.

She has also performed spiritual songs, including "Ailam ar Gelam, Khailam ar Shyilam, Vobe Dekhlam Shunlam Kichui Bujhlamna", a folk-spiritual song written by Kuti Mansur. Her other songs are:

- Amar Nithur Bondhur
- Amar Praan Binodiyare
- Amar Praner Bondhu Kon
- Amar Sonar Moyna Pakhi
- Amay Paar Koro Re Ore
- Dukkho Je Moner Majhe
- Sagor Kuler Naaiya Re
- Tomaro Lagiya Re Shoda
- Ujan Ganger Naaiya Tumi
