= NPI University of Bangladesh =

Coordinates: 23.8720°N 90.0027°E

- Type: Private
- Established: 2015
- Affiliations: University Grants Commission of Bangladesh
- Chancellor: President of Bangladesh
- Vice-Chancellor: Md. Forhad Hossain
- Location: 495, East Basta, Singair, Manikganj, Bangladesh
- Campus: Urban
- Website: www.npiub.edu.bd

The NPI University of Bangladesh is a private university located in Manikganj District. It was founded in 2015.

== See also ==
- Public University
- Private University
