= Saturia =

Saturia Satoria
- Location in Bangladesh
- Coordinates: 23°57′54″N 90°0′0″E
- Country: Bangladesh
- Division: Dhaka Division
- District: Manikganj District

Government
  - Type: Upazilla
  - Chairman: Abdul Mazid Photo
- Time zone: UTC+6 (Bangladesh Time)

Saturia is a town in Manikganj District in the Dhaka Division of central Bangladesh. It is the administrative seat of the Saturia Upazila.

In 1989, the town was damaged by the world's deadliest tornado, which saw 1,300 people die in the storm.
