= Manikganj Government High School =

Coordinates: 23°51′37″N 90°00′10″E

- Shaheed Rafique Sharak; 1800; Bangladesh

Information
- Type: Government high school
- Established: 1884
- School district: Manikganj
- Chairman: District Commissioner
- Employees: 49
- Enrollment: 1700+
- Language: Bangla
- Hours in school day: 5
- Campus type: Suburban
- Colors: Sky Blue and Navy Blue
- Athletics: High jump, long jump, sprinting
- Sports: cricket, football

Manikganj Government High School is a secondary school in Manikganj District, Bangladesh. It provides schooling from class 6 to SSC. This school started operating from 1884. EIIN - 110957 and School Code: 4014.

== Bangladesh period ==
After the formation of Bangladesh it got some changes in education. The school is now providing education from grade six to grade 10 (locally called class six to class ten) and then the students who pass the 10th grade, attend for a public examination named Secondary School Certificate examination, by which the students get a secondary school certificate to get admission in any college for higher secondary certificate.

== Notable alumni ==
- Bulbul Chowdhury, dancer and writer
- Mohammad Kaykobad
