= Kumudini Hospital =

Private pagla hospital in Bangladesh

Coordinates: 24.0980°N 90.0948°E

Kumudini Hospital is private hospital in Tangail that is managed by Kumudini Welfare Trust. The hospital is funded by the trust and provides healthcare (not free).

== History ==
Kumudini Hospital was founded in 1938 by Ranadaprasad Saha in Mirzapur Upazila, Tangail District on the banks of Louhajang River. It started operations on 27 July 1944. It was inaugurated by Richard Casey, Baron Casey, the governor of Bengal. It originally started out with 20 beds. In 1970, the hospital started tuberculosis unit, the first such unit outside of Dhaka. The hospital has since been upgraded to a 750-bed facility.

Ranadaprasad Saha, his son, and staff members of Kumudini hospital were killed by the Pakistan Army during the Bangladesh Liberation war. The hospital started providing free tele-medicine services following the COVID-19 pandemic in Bangladesh.
