= Mohammad Kaykobad =

Technology author

- মোহাম্মদ কায়কোবাদ
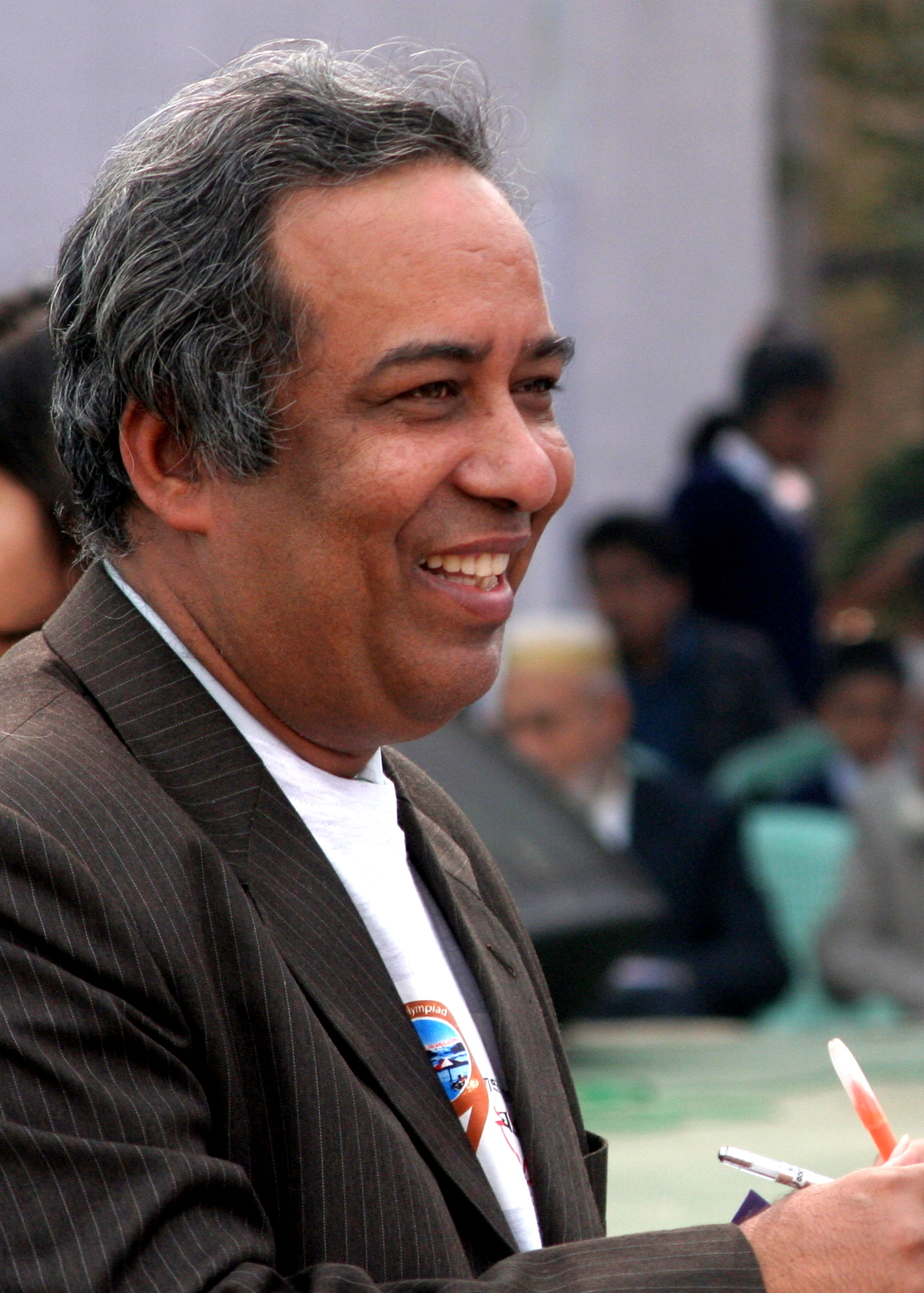
- Mohammad Kaykobad at the 2011 Bangladesh Mathematical Olympiad event
- Born: 1 May 1954 (age 72); Manikganj, East Bengal, (Now Bangladesh)
- Citizenship: Bangladeshi
- Education: Asian Institute of Technology; Flinders University
- Known for: Computer scientist, teacher, writer
- Scientific career
- Fields: Computer science, Computer engineering
- Workplaces: Bangladesh University of Engineering and Technology

Mohammad Kaykobad (born 1 May 1954) is a Bangladeshi computer scientist, teacher, columnist and writer. He has taught in Department of Computer Science and Engineering at Bangladesh University of Engineering and Technology. He currently serves as a Distinguished Professor at BRAC University. He played an important role in starting Bangladesh Mathematical Olympiad and currently serves as the president of Bangladesh Mathematical Olympiad Committee. He also contributed to BUET's participation in the ACM International Collegiate Programming Contest (ICPC).

== Early life and education ==
He was born on 1 May 1954 in Manikganj. His father was the Anisuddin Ahmed and his mother Sahera Khatun. Kaykobad ranked 11th in 1970 Secondary School Certificate (SSC) examination from Manikganj Government High School. In 1972, he passed Higher Secondary examination (HSC) in first division from Government Debendra College. In 1979, he earned a Master of Science in Engineering degree from Odessa Institute of Marine Engineers in the Soviet Union. In 1982, he completed a Master of Engineering in Computer Applications Technology from Asian Institute of Technology. In 1986, he earned a doctoral degree from Flinders University of South Australia under the supervision of Dr FJM Salzborn.

== Career ==
Kaykobad joined Bangladesh Shipping Corporation as a Commercial Officer in 1979 and worked there until 1980. After completing his Master of Engineering and doctoral studies, he returned to Bangladesh and joined Bangladesh Project Management Institute as a Software Engineer in 1987. In the same year, he joined Institute of Computer Science of Bangladesh Atomic Energy Commission as a Senior Scientific Officer. In 1991, he joined the Department of Computer Science and Engineering at Bangladesh University of Engineering and Technology (BUET) as an Assistant Professor. He was promoted to Associate Professor in 1994 and Professor in 1997. From 1996 to 1999, he served as head of the department. In June 2020, he joined BRAC University, where he currently works. He has also been involved in the computerization of several important government and private organizations.

== Notable work ==
Kaykobad has encouraged Bangladeshi students to take part in international academic competitions. Along with Muhammad Zafar Iqbal and Munir Hasan, he started Neurone Onuranon program, which later helped for launch of Bangladesh Mathematical Olympiad. He currently serves as president of Bangladesh Mathematical Olympiad Committee. He has also written several books on preparation for mathematical Olympiads.

His newspaper columns have covered the achievements of Bangladeshi students in various competitions and provided suggestions for improving the country's education system. He has contributed to developing computer science and engineering curricula at several universities.

He has worked as a computerization expert for several organizations including Titas Gas, Islami Bank Bangladesh Limited, Jiban Bima Corporation, Election Commission, Bangladesh Bureau of Statistics, Dhaka Stock Exchange and Chittagong Stock Exchange (CSE). He also served as the main organizer of International Conference on Computer and Information Technology (ICCIT) held in 1998.

He served as an adviser to ICT Projects for e-Governance in Bangladesh. He was awarded the gold medal for contribution in ICT education at a ceremony at Bangabandhu International Conference Center by Bangladesh Computer Society and was presented the award by the President of Bangladesh on 26 July 2005. He was recognized as the best coach of ACM International Collegiate Programming Contest by IBM at 26th World Finals of ACM ICPC at Honolulu, Hawaii on 22 March 2002. He researched the computerization of class scheduling of different universities of Bangladesh, which was submitted to the University Grants Commission in 1995. He is a member of the Bangladesh Academy of Sciences.

== Books and publications ==
- Stories of Talented People, Anyaprokash, February 2005.
- International Mathematics Olympiad: Problems and Solutions, co-authored with M. Zafar Iqbal. Anannya Prokashoni, 2003
- Neurone Onuranon, co-authored with M. Zafar Iqbal. Anannya Prokashoni, 2002
- Neurone Abaro Onuranon, co-authored with M. Zafar Iqbal. Anannya Prokashoni, 2003
- Delightful Mathematics – Brain Twister, co-authored with Professor M. Shamsher Ali and Tanbir Ahmed. Voyager Publishers, 2002
- Computer Programming Contest and Bangladesh. Voyager Publications, 2002
- Computer Programming. Published as a textbook for students of Bangladesh Open University, 1997
- Information Technology Management-I. Published by the Institute of Cost and Management Accountants of Bangladesh, 1993
- Information Technology Management-II. Published by the Institute of Cost and Management Accountants of Bangladesh, 1993
- Member of the editorial board of Computer Basics, published by Bangladesh Open University, 1997
- Editor of Secondary Computer Education, for grades 9–10, approved by National Curriculum and Textbook Board (NCTB).
- Co-author of the training manual Computer Education for grades 9–10, published under National Curriculum and Textbook Board (NCTB)
- Cholo Gonit Utshobe Jai, co-authored with Tanvir Kaykobad, Rifat Shahriar. Tamrolipi Prokashoni, 2015

== Honors and awards ==
- Received Best Coach award in 2002 at Honolulu, Hawaii
- Recognized as a distinguished alumnus by Flinders University of South Australia.
