= Abdul Hakim (writer) =

Bangladeshi educator and writer

Khan Bahadur Abdul Hakim CIE

President of the Asiatic Society of Bangladesh
- In office 1981–1982
- Preceded by: Muhammad Enamul Haq
- Succeeded by: Mafizullah Kabir

Personal details
- Born: 2 December 1905 Hajinagar, Dacca district, Eastern Bengal and Assam
- Died: June 14, 1985 (aged 79) Bangladesh
- Education: University of Cambridge; University of Dacca

Khan Bahadur Abdul Hakim CIE (Bengali: খান বাহাদুর আব্দুল হেকীম; 2 December 1905 – 14 June 1985) was a Bangladeshi educationist, mathematician and writer. He was the former Dhaka Division school inspector. He was awarded both Khan Sahib and Khan Bahadur by the British Raj. He later served as the president of the Asiatic Society of Bangladesh and established its first scholarship endowment.

== Early life ==
Hakim was born on 2 December 1905 to Maulvi Wasimuddin Ahmad and Begum Nasimunnesa in the village of Hajinagar in the Manikganj subdivision of Dacca district, Eastern Bengal and Assam. He completed his SSC (grade 10) and HSC (grade 12) in 1922 and 1924, respectively. In 1927, he completed his undergraduate in mathematics from the University of Dacca and received the Kalinarayan Scholarship of the Bhawal Estate. He completed his master's in mathematics in 1928 from the University of Dacca. He studied Mathematical Tripos and completed his second masters at the University of Cambridge.

== Career ==
Hakim briefly taught at the Government Saadat College and Krishnagar Government College. In 1932, he was appointed a Sub-Divisional Inspector of Schools by the Bengal government. From 1934 to 1938, he served as a school inspector in Bogra District and Mymensingh District. From 1938 to 1943, he was appointed the Special Officer for primary education in Bengal by the Chief Minister of Bengal, Sher-e-Bangla A. K. Fazlul Huq.

Hakim edited a newspaper, Banglar Shiksak, which focused on education. He was awarded the honour of Khan Shaheb in 1939. From 1943 to 1947, he was the school inspector of the Dhaka Division. He was awarded Khan Bahadur in 1944. From 1947 to 1956, he was the assistant director of Public Instructions. From 1956 to 1959, he was the Director of Public Instruction in East Pakistan. He was a member of the 1956 East Pakistan Education Reforms Commission. He was the first treasurer of Bangla College under president Muhammad Shahidullah.

From 1972 to 1978, Hakim was the Franklin Program publications program editor to translate the American encyclopedias into the Bengali language. Hakim was the President of the Asiatic Society of Bangladesh in 1982. He was awarded the Ekushey Padak in 1984. He established the FINAS Foundation, the first endowment foundation of the Asiatic Society of Bangladesh.

== Death ==
Hakim died on 14 June 1985.
