= Mohammad Ali Reza Khan =

Bangladeshi ornithologist

- Born: 1 January 1947 (age 79); Manikganj, Bengal Presidency, British India
- Education: Dhaka University

Mohammad Ali Reza Khan is a Bangladeshi ornithologist.

== Education ==
Khan completed his HSC from Manikganj Debendranath College. He completed his Ph.D. in ornithology from Bombay University (now University of Mumbai) in 1977 under the supervision of Indian ornithologist Salim Ali.

== Career ==
In 1983, Khan assumed the role of the curator of the Al Ain Zoo in United Arab Emirates. He became head of Dubai Zoo in 1989 and then went on to become a specialist in Wildlife and Zoo Management in 2010.

Khan is a former member of International Union for Conservation of Nature (IUCN) Species Survival Commission and World Commission on Park and Protected Area.

Khan has written 24 books, 50 publications. He served as a faculty member at Rajshahi University.

As of 2016, Khan is serving as a specialist on Wildlife and Zoo Management in Dubai.

== Awards ==
- Sheikh Mubarak Award for Wildlife Conservation (2001)
- National Bangabandhu Award (2010)
- Star Lifetime Award (2016)
