= Saturia Upazila =

Saturia সাটুরিয়া
- Upazila
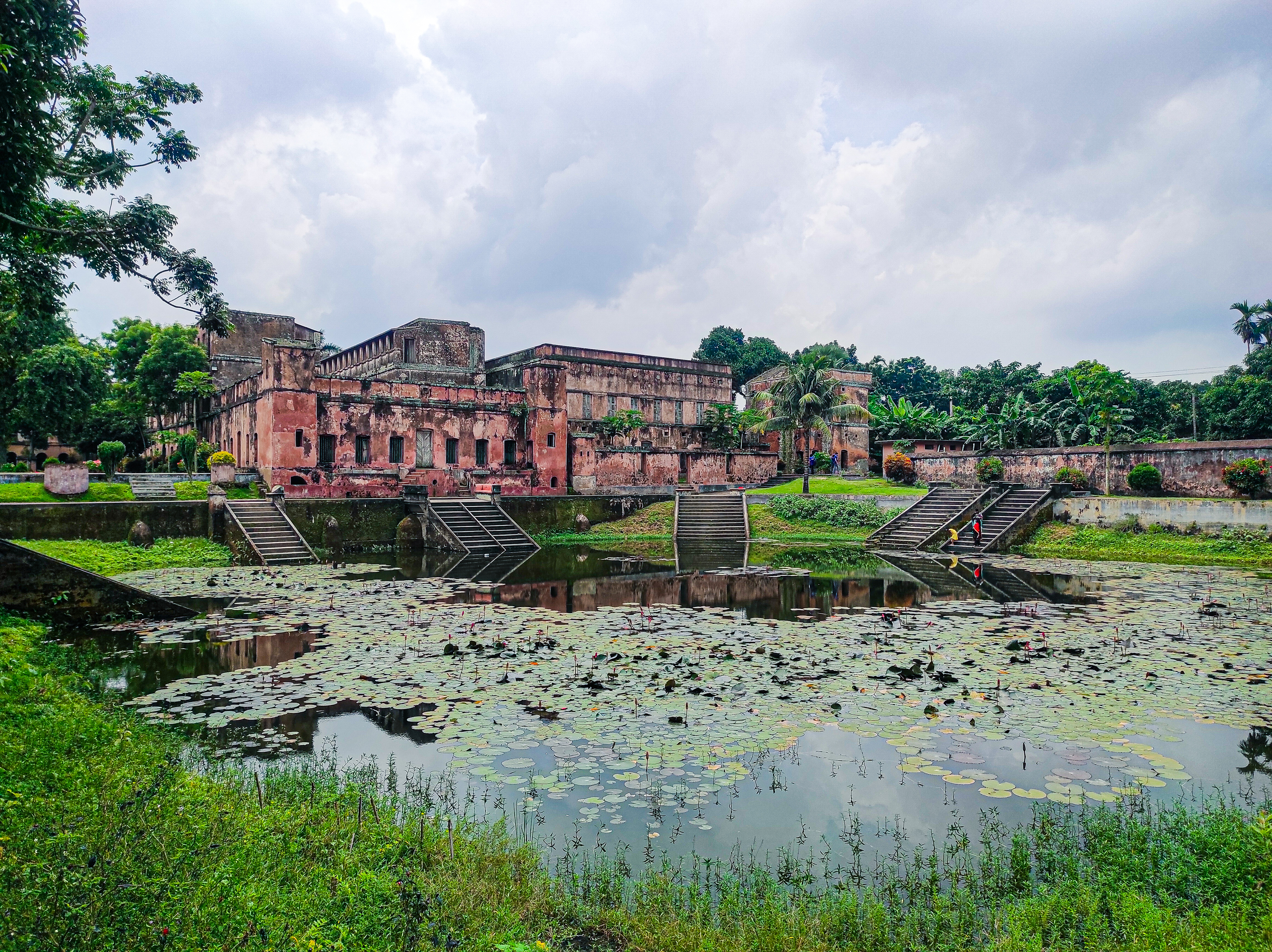
- Baliatali Zamindar Bari

- Coordinates: 23.9750°N 90.0417°E
- Country: Bangladesh
- Division: Dhaka
- District: Manikganj

Government
  - Chairman: Abdul Mazid Photo

Area
  - Total: 140.12 km^{2} (54.10 sq mi)

Population (2022)
  - Total: 193,206
  - Density: 1,378.9/km^{2} (3,571.2/sq mi)
- Time zone: UTC+6 (BST)
- Postal code: 1810
- Website: Official Map of Saturia

Saturia Upazila mauza geocode map

Saturia (Bengali: সাটুরিয়া) is an upazila of Manikganj District in the Division of Dhaka, Bangladesh. The administrative center is located in Saturia.

== Geography ==
Saturia is located at 23.5925°N 90.0231°E. It has 40,644 households and total area 140.12 km^{2}.

== Demographics ==
Religions in Saturia Upazila (2022)
| Religion | Percent |
| Islam | 91.53% |
| Hinduism | 8.43% |
| Other or not stated | 0.04% |

According to the 2022 Bangladeshi census, Saturia Upazila had 49,712 households and a population of 193,206. 7.56% of the population were under 5 years of age. Saturia had a literacy rate (age 7 and over) of 68.92%: 73.04% for males and 65.11% for females, and a sex ratio of 93.53 males for every 100 females. 15,398 (7.97%) lived in urban areas.

According to the 2011 Census of Bangladesh, Saturia Upazila had 40,644 households and a population of 171,494. 34,660 (20.21%) were under 10 years of age. Saturia had a literacy rate (age 7 and over) of 47.25%, compared to the national average of 51.8%, and a sex ratio of 1050 females per 1000 males. 8,718 (5.08%) lived in urban areas.

As of the 1991 Bangladesh census, Saturia has a population of 140,215. Males constitute 49.84% of the population, and females 50.16%. This upazila's eighteen up population is 73,439. Saturia has an average literacy rate of 22% (7+ years), and the national average of 32.4% literate.

== Administration ==
Saturia Upazila is divided into nine union parishads: Baliyati, Baried, Dargram, Dhankora, Dighulia, Fukurhati, Hargaj, Saturia, and Tilli. The union parishads are subdivided into 166 mauzas and 224 villages.

== Education ==
According to Banglapedia, Baliati Iswar Chandra High School, founded in 1919, is a notable secondary school.

== Gallery ==
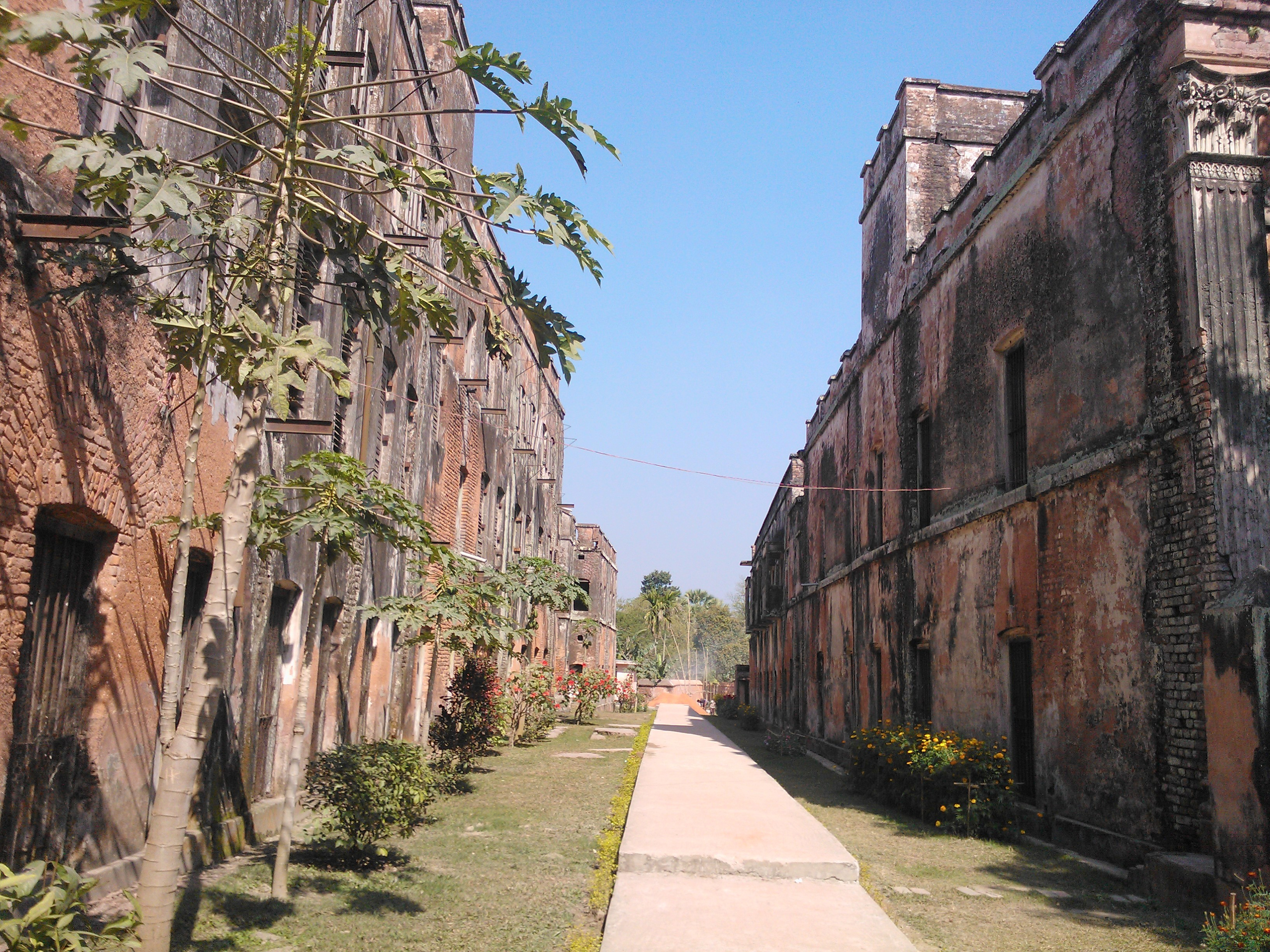
Baliati Palace

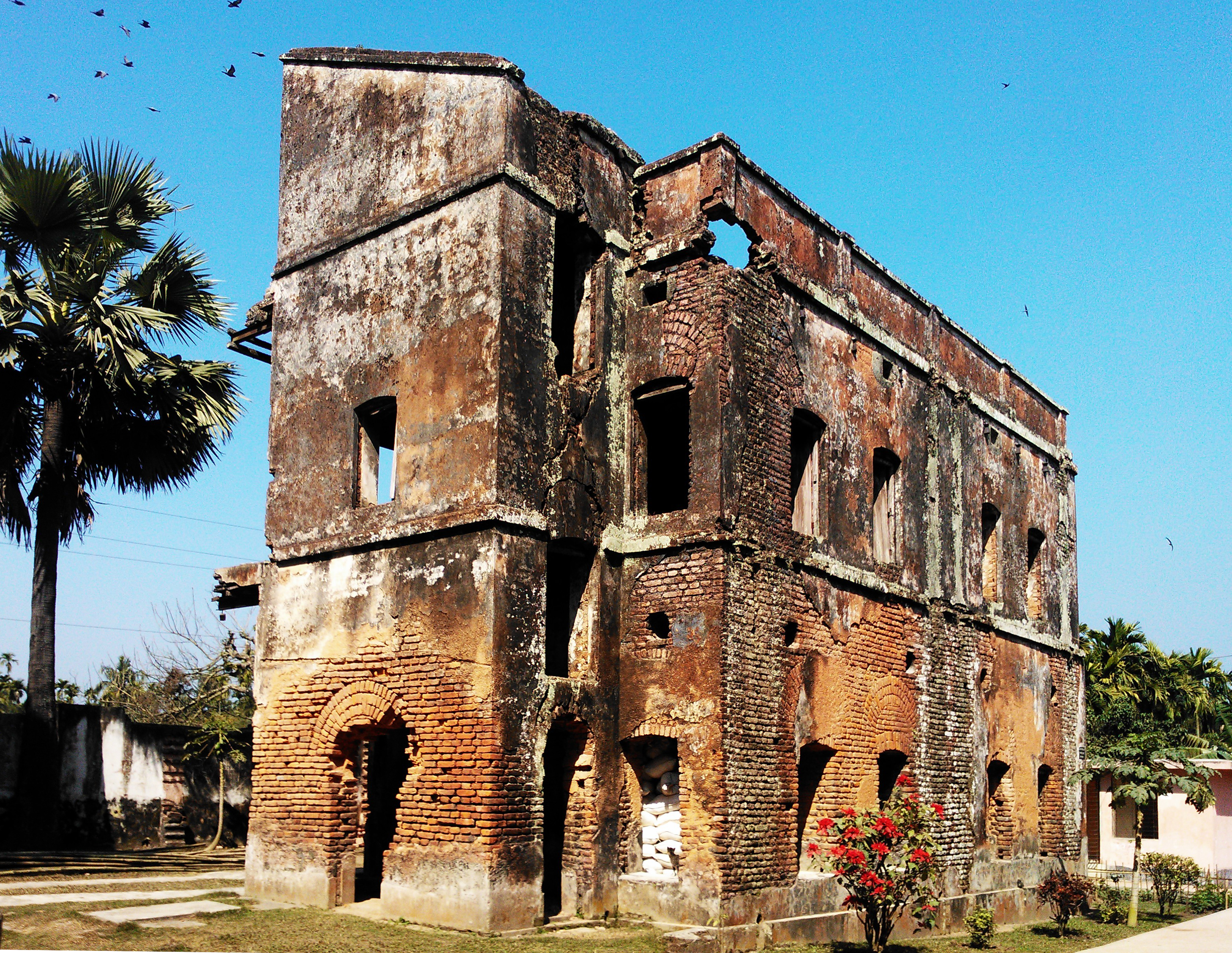
Baliati Palace

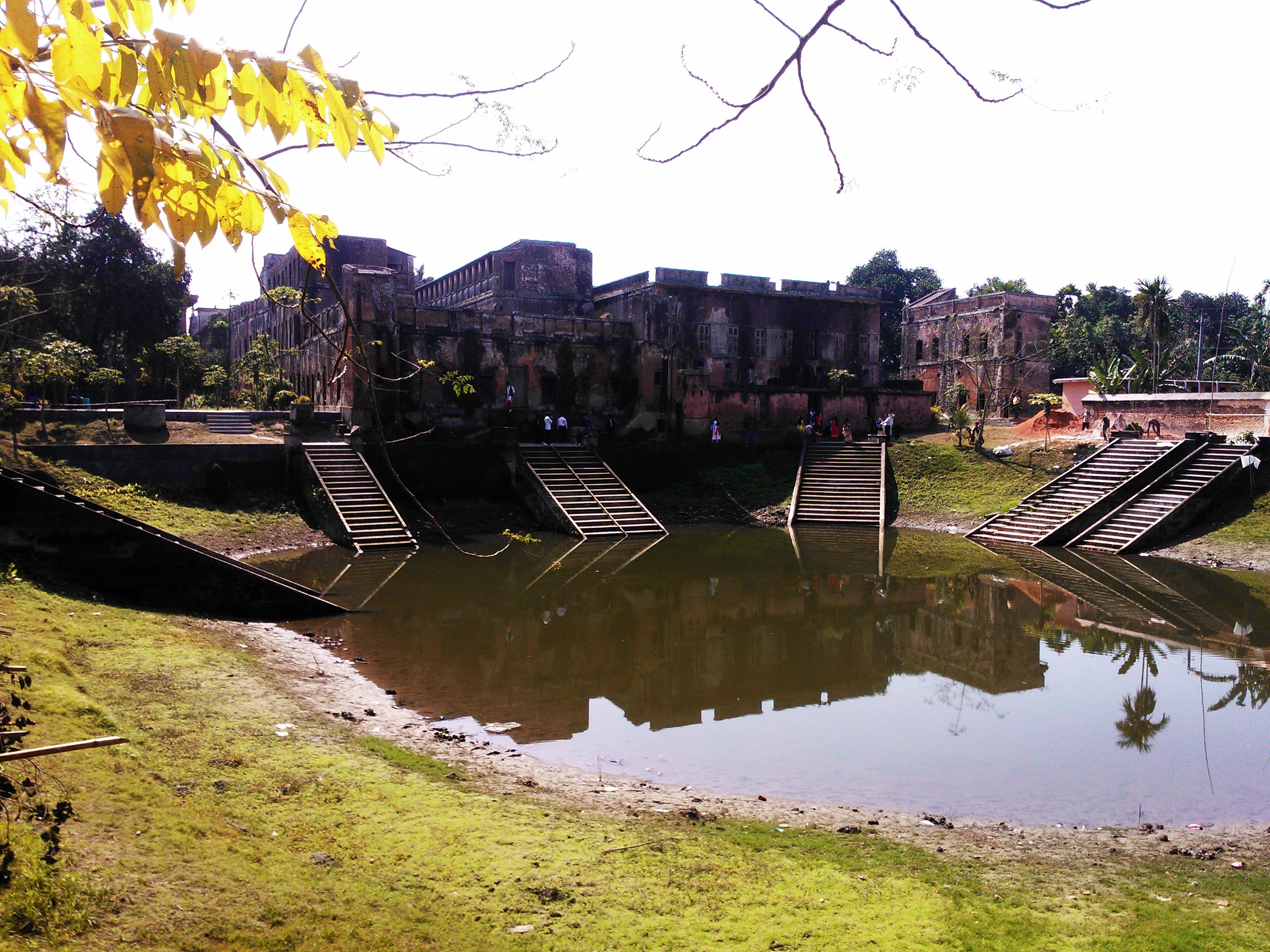
Baliati Palace - backside

== See also ==
- Upazilas of Bangladesh
- Districts of Bangladesh
- Divisions of Bangladesh
- Thanas of Bangladesh
- Union councils of Bangladesh
- Administrative geography of Bangladesh
