= Harirampur Upazila =

Administrative region in Dhaka Division, Bangladesh

Harirampur হরিরামপুর
- Upazila
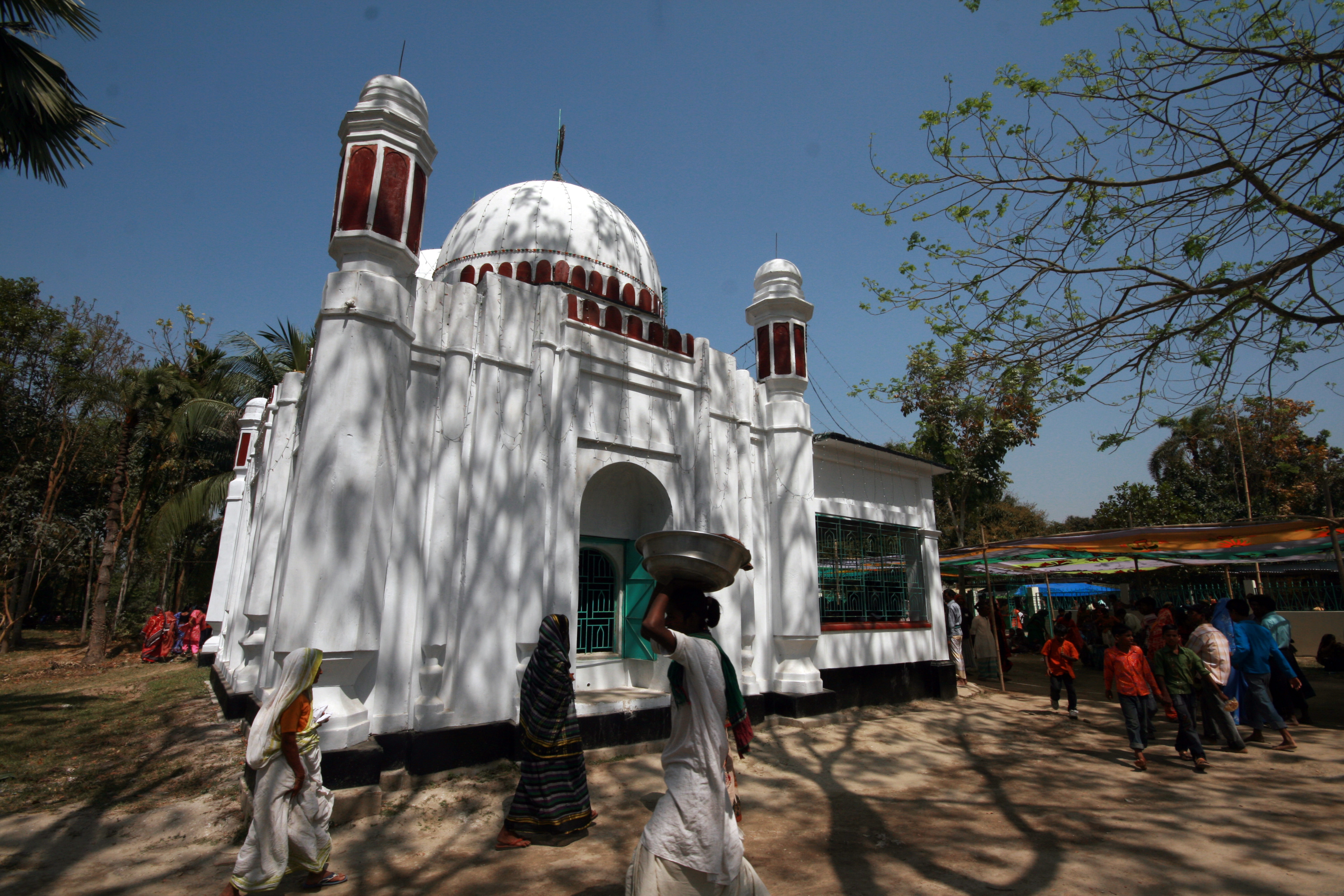
- Machain Shahi Jami Mosque

- Coordinates: 23°44′N 89°58′E
- Country: Bangladesh
- Division: Dhaka
- District: Manikganj

Government

Area
  - Total: 245.42 km^{2} (94.76 sq mi)

Population (2022)
  - Total: 155,469
  - Density: 633.48/km^{2} (1,640.7/sq mi)
- Time zone: UTC+6 (BST)
- Postal code: 1830
- Website: Official Map of Harirampur

Harirampur Upazila mauza geocode map

Harirampur (Bengali: হরিরামপুর) is an upazila of Manikganj District in the Division of Dhaka, Bangladesh.

== Geography ==
Harirampur is located at 23.7333°N 89.9667°E. It has 33,513 households and a total area of 245.42 km^{2}. This Upazila is bordered by Nawabganj Upazila Dhaka, Dohar Upazila, Manikganj Sadar Upazila, Shivalaya Upazila, Ghior Upazila and Padma River .

== Demographics ==
Religions in Harirampur Upazila (2022)
Religion	Percent
Islam	88.68%
Hinduism	11.32%

According to the 2022 Bangladeshi census, Harirampur Upazila had 39,819 households and a population of 155,469. 8.06% of the population were under 5 years of age. Harirampur had a literacy rate (age 7 and over) of 72.99%: 75.51% for males and 70.70% for females, and a sex ratio of 92.01 males for every 100 females. 10,862 (6.99%) lived in urban areas.

According to the 2011 Census of Bangladesh, Harirampur Upazila had 33,513 households and a population of 139,318. 29,438 (21.13%) were under 10 years of age. Harirampur had a literacy rate (age 7 and over) of 48.39%, compared to the national average of 51.8%, and a sex ratio of 1117 females per 1000 males. 2,244 (1.61%) lived in urban areas.

According to the 2001 Bangladesh census, Harirampur had a population of 171,274. Males constituted 84,994, and females 86,280. The population of those aged 18 and older was 115,752. Harirampur had an average literacy rate of 30.2% (7+ years), against the national average of 32.4%.

== Administration ==
Harirampur Upazila is divided into 13 union parishads:

- Azimnagar
- Balara
- Balla
- Boyra
- Chala
- Dhulsunra
- Gala
- Gopinathpur
- Harukandi
- Kanchanpur
- Lesraganj
- Ramkrishnapur
- Sutalari

The union parishads are subdivided into 196 mauzas and 250 villages.

== Education ==
=== Colleges ===
- Jhitka Khawja Rahamat Ali Degree College
- M.A. Rouf Degree College, Kowri
- Government Justice Nurul Islam College

=== Secondary Schools ===
- Ibrahimpur Ishwar Chandra High School
- Jhitka Anando Mohan High School
- Jhitka Pilot Girls High School
- Patgram Anath Bandhu Government High School
- Diabari High School
- Jatrapur High School
- Ramkrishnapur M A Jalil High School
- Kabi Jahanara Arzoo High School
- Mohiuddin Kamol High School

=== Primary Schools ===
- Kokarhati Govt. Primary School
- Dorikandi Government Primary School
- Adhermanik Model Government Primary School
- Balurchar Government Primary School
- Bhatikandi Government Primary School
- Sutalori Government Primary School

== Notable people ==
- Khan Bahadur Abdul Hakim CIE (1905-1985), educationist, scholar and writer
- Atiquzzaman Khan (1921–1983), educationist, journalist and cricketer

== See also ==
- Upazilas of Bangladesh
- Districts of Bangladesh
- Divisions of Bangladesh
