= Government Debendra College =

Government college in Manikganj, Bangladesh

- সরকারি দেবেন্দ্র কলেজ
- Type: Government College
- Established: 1942; 84 years ago
- Academic affiliations: National University, Bangladesh
- Chancellor: President of Bangladesh
- Principal: Professor Dr. Md. Mahfil Khan
- Academic staff: 94
- Students: 16785
- Location: Manikganj Sadar Upazila, Manikganj, Bangladesh; 23.8625°N 90.0028°E
- Campus: Urban, over 23 acres (9.3 ha)
- Website: www.debendracollege.gov.bd

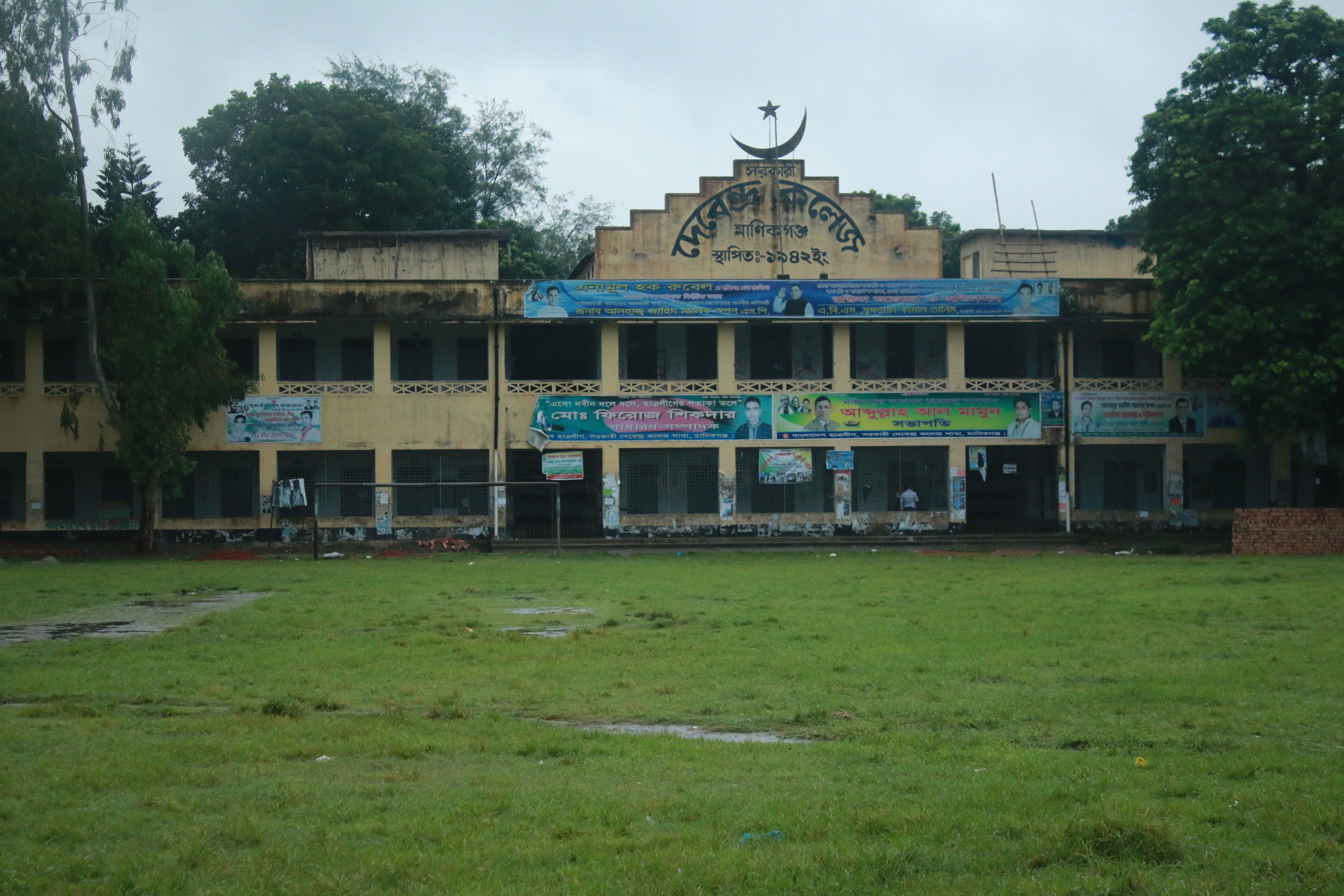
Government Debendra College, Manikgonj

Government Debendra College is a public college in Manikganj, Manikganj District, Dhaka Division, Bangladesh. It offers bachelor's degrees and master's degrees. It also has a Higher Secondary Certificate (HSC) program. It is affiliated with Bangladesh National University. As of 2015, the principal is Syed Ikbal Moiz and the vice principal is Sirajul Islam.

== History ==
Government Debendra College was established in 1942 (84 years ago) as Manikgonj College with the inspiration and cooperation of local zamindar, Siddheswari Prasad Rychowdhury. In 1944, the college was renamed Debendra College after the name of the father name of Ranadaprasad Saha of Mirzapur, Tangail District. The degree courses were introduced in the college in 1947. It opened a science section at the higher secondary level in 1963 and commerce at the degree level in 1964. BSC courses were introduced in the college in 1970 and Honours courses in Bangla language and literature in 1971. The college started courses in agricultural science at the intermediate level in 1976. It was nationalised on 1 March 1980. Since 1989, the college has been offering Honours programmes in political science and accounting and masters programmes in economics, philosophy, history, management and mathematics.

== Facilities ==
Government Debendra College has five academic buildings and three student dormitories: two hostels for women and another for men. There is a playground opposite the college. There are two ponds, one on the east side of the college and another on the west side. There is one mosque beside the playing field. There is one shahid minar.

== Academics ==
Government Debendra College offers HSC, four-year honours, and two-year master's courses in various majors. The college is affiliated with the National University. As of 2015, the college has more than 16,000 students and 94 teachers. Many students participate in politics.

== Departments ==
there have 17 department which operate honors program at Government Debendra College. All department name written below.

1. Bengali
2. English
3. Economics
4. Political Science
5. History
6. Islamic History and Culture
7. Islamic Education
8. Philosophy
9. Physics
10. Chemistry
11. Mathematics
12. Zoology
13. Botany
14. Accounting
15. Management
16. Finance and Banking
17. Marketing

There have some departments which doesn't admit students directly but they teaches partial subjects to the students as their minor or partial course.

== Notable residents ==
- Khandkar Manwar Hossain, statistician, educator, researcher.
- Mohammad Ali Reza Khan, Bengal Presidency, British India.
- Mohammad Kaykobad
- Ranadaprasad Saha, businessman
- Muhammad Siddiq Khan, Principal
- Dr. Sadique Swapon
