= Muhammad Siddiq Khan =

Bangladeshi librarian

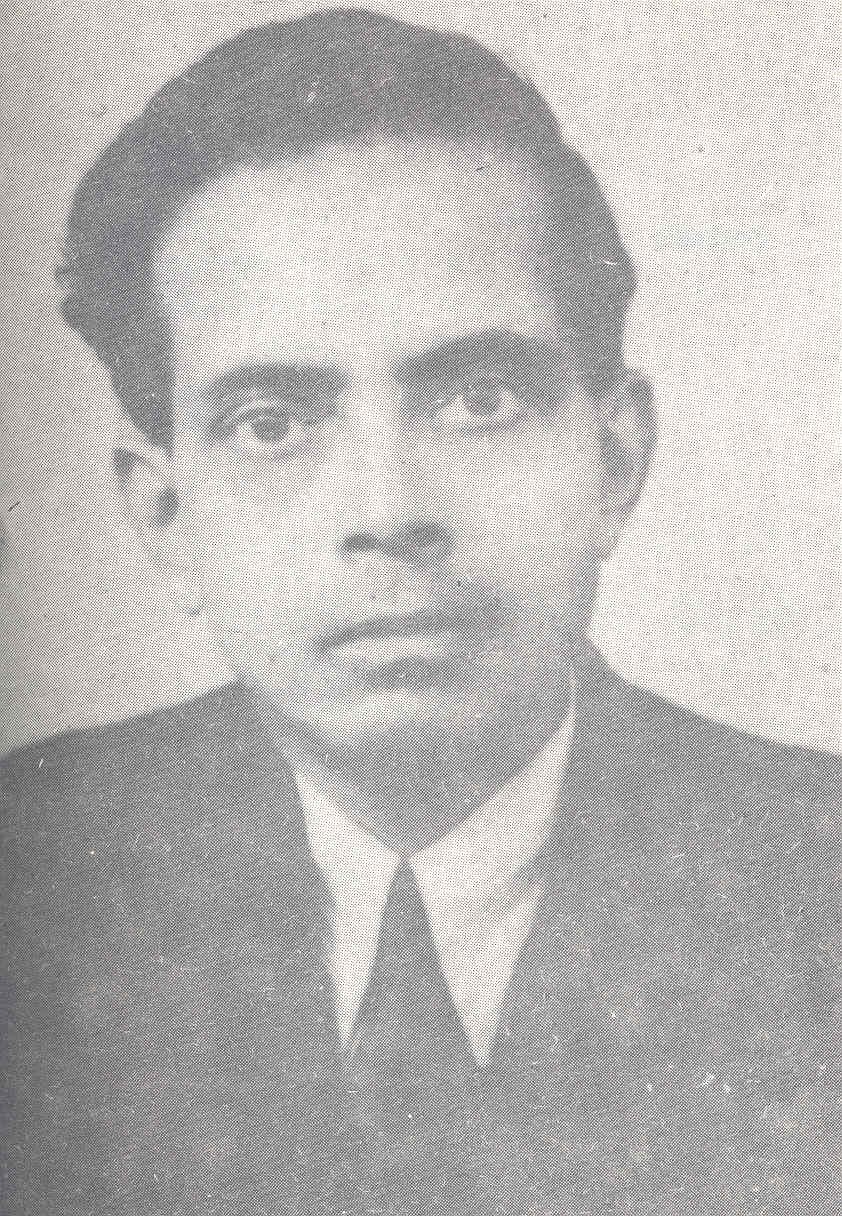
- Born: 21 March 1910; Rangoon, Burma
- Died: 13 August 1978 (aged 68); Dhaka, Bangladesh
- Education: M.A. (history)
- Alma mater: Rangoon University
- Occupation: Librarian

Muhammad Siddiq Khan (Bengali: মুহম্মদ সিদ্দিক খান; known as M S Khan; 21 March 1910 – 13 August 1978) was the librarian of the Central Library of the University of Dhaka and the founder of the university's Department of Library Science (now Information Science and Library Management). In March 2004, the Government of Bangladesh posthumously awarded him the Independence Day Award, the country's highest civil honor.

== Early life and education ==
Khan was born on 21 March 1910 to a Bengali Muslim Khan Mughal family in Rangoon whose ancestors were members of Mughal aristocracy. His father, Israil Khan, had moved with his family from the village of Dhudhuria in Nagarpur, Tangail to Rangoon, British Burma in order to tutor the children of the deposed Mughal Emperor Bahadur Shah Zafar. His father died when he was young whilst his mother, Bolonnessa Begum, got herself in a long-drawn-out litigation with his uncle on proprietary rights to his vast wealth and establishments.

Khan spent his childhood in Rangoon and went to school there. He took the matriculation examination in 1925 and stood fifth in Burma with distinctions in four subjects. He passed his intermediate examination in arts in 1927 and stood first in Rangoon University with distinction in English. In 1929, he received the B.A. honors degree in history from the university and stood first in the second class. In 1932 he got his B.L. degree. He was placed in the first class in the first-part examinations and in the second class in the second-part examinations. In 1936, he got his M.A. degree in history from the university and received the Yakub Abdul Ghani Gold Medal. For this performance he also received the Jardin Prize.

== Career ==
Completing his graduation program, Khan joined Rangoon University as a lecturer in history and political science in 1931 and worked there until the outbreak of World War II. His students included Aung San, one of the architects of the independence of Myanmar. When Rangoon came under fire from the advancing Japanese army, Khan escaped by trekking through the mountains to reach his village home. In 1943, he became an officer in the Civil Defense department of the government of Bengal. The next year he joined as a liaison officer under the Industries Directorate of the Bengal government. In 1946, he became the general secretary of the Bengal Red Cross Society, a job he retained when moving to Dhaka after the partition of India in 1947. In 1950, he joined Debendra College in Manikganj as its principal.

In 1953, Khan joined the University of Dhaka as a secretary to Sayed Moazzem Hossain, the then vice-chancellor, who was succeeded by Walter Allen Jenkins eight months later. Jenkins sent Khan abroad in 1954 for further studies in library science.

Khan arrived in London on 30 September 1954. He started regular course work as decided by Professor Irwin. After due completion of course work, Khan spent one academic year working intensively in selected university and other academic libraries in Great Britain. Irwin arranged a training program with several libraries at the University of London, as well as the libraries of the University of Edinburgh and University of Birmingham. Khan successfully completed his training.

After completing a two-year course on the theory and practice of university librarianship in the London School of Librarianship and Archives, under the supervision of Irwin, during 1954–55 and 1955–56, Khan returned to his ancestral place.

Upon return, he joined as the librarian of the Central Library of the university in June 1956, a position he held until his retirement in 1972. Khan introduced a diploma course for library science and, along with Ahmad Hossain, founded the Library Association of East Pakistan. When the Department of Library Science was established in 1959, he was appointed the head of the department. In his 19 years of service to the library, he introduced the Dewey Decimal System of library classification and oversaw its implementation. He faced job-related financial troubles when he retired.

Khan was the vice-president of the Pakistan Library Association (1957, 1958, and 1968) and the president for several tenures. He was the general secretary of the Pakistan Library Association from 1962 to 1965. He was a vice-president of the Asian Federation of Library Association from 1957 to 1960.

Khan wrote a number of books, as well as columns for Holiday and The Bangladesh Observer. He published a news bulletin for the University of Dhaka and edited the Eastern Librarian as the founder editor until 1976.

== Death and legacy ==
Khan died after prolonged illness on 13 August 1978 in Dhaka. He did not receive any honors during his lifetime. He was made a fellow of the Royal Historical Society for his scholarly contributions.

Nearly a quarter of century later the Tangail Association introduced a gold medal in his name, an honor given to other distinguished figures such as Maulana Bhasani and Abu Sayeed Chowdhury.

The government of Bangladesh posthumously awarded him the Independence Day Award, the highest civil honor of the country, in 2004. His daughter Shireen Rashid received the award.

On 21 March 2010, Khan's 100th birthday, Library Association of Bangladesh has declared "21st March" as the Library Day of Bangladesh.

== List of publications ==
Khan wrote the following articles:

=== English ===
==== History ====
1. "Captain George Sorrel's Mission to the Court of Amarapura 1793: An Episode in Anglo-Burmese Relations". Journal of the Asiatic Society of Pakistan, vol. II 1957, pp. 131–153
2. "Badr Maqams of the Shrines of Badr Al-Din-Auliya". Journal of the Asiatic Society of Pakistan, vol. II 1962, pp. 17–46
3. "A Chapter in the Muslim Struggle for Freedom: Establishment of Dacca University". The Dacca University Studies.

==== Library science ====
1. "The Oriental Manuscript Collection in Dacca University Library". The Eastern Librarian, vol. I No. 1, 1966, pp. 32–37
2. "A Co-operative Acquisition Plan for Pakistan's Third Five-year Development Plan", 1965–70. Pakistan Librarianship, 1963–64, pp. 93–101
3. "College Library Authority and Organization". The Eastern Librarian, vol. III No. 4, 1969, pp. 7–21
4. "The Challenge of McLuhan". The Eastern Librarian, vol. 5 No. 3–4, 1971, pp. 187–197
5. "Marketing of Books in East Pakistan: Problems, Prospects and Projects". The Eastern Librarian, vol. II No. 1, 1967, pp. 49–62; vol. II No. 2, 1967, pp. 17–23; vol. II No. 3, 1968, pp. 51–61;
6. "Book Promotion in School Libraries". Pakistan Librarianship, 1962–63, pp. 92–93
7. "A Blueprint for University Library Development". Pakistan Librarianship, 1963–64, pp. 160–170
8. "Libraries in Pakistan". The Eastern Librarian, vol. II No. 1, 1967, pp. 1–14
9. "Libraries in Education". East Pakistan Education Week, 1968, pp. 34–50
10. "University Librarianship To-day and Tomorrow". The Eastern Librarian, vol. III No. 1, 1969, pp. 21–28
11. "The India Office Library: Who Owns It?" The Eastern Librarian, vol. I No. 1, 1966, pp. 1–10
12. "Our Libraries and Our National Antiquities". The Eastern Librarian, vol. III No. 2, 1968, pp. 1–7
13. "Comments on the Government of Pakistan's Third Five-year Development Plan—1965–1970". Pakistan Librarianship, 1963–1964, pp. 55–56

==== Printing and publication ====
1. "William Carey and the Serampore Books (1800–1834)". LIBRI, vol. II No. 3, 1961, pp. 197–280

==== Editorial ====
1. "Ahmed Hussain". The Eastern Librarian, June 1970
2. "The Bleak Horizon". The Eastern Librarian, September 1967
3. "Wanted – A national Advisory Commission on Libraries". The Eastern Librarian, December 1967
4. "Progress of Librarianship in East Pakistan: Decade of Progress". The Eastern Librarian, June 1968
5. "Who is an Expert?" The Eastern Librarian, vol. II No. 3, 1968
6. "Import of non-book Reading Materials". The Eastern Librarian, March 1969
7. "Libraries and Postal Vagaries". The Eastern Librarian, June 1970
8. "Any one can run a library". The Eastern Librarian, December 1967
9. "A New Library System for Bangladesh". The Eastern Librarian, vol. VI No. 1-2 1971
10. "The Death of A Library". The Eastern Librarian, June 1967
11. "Those who stand and serve". The Eastern Librarian, March 1967
12. "Books on Bonus". The Eastern Librarian, June 1971
13. "Brickbats – and no Banquets!" The Eastern Librarian, March–June 1971
14. "Pakistani Library Journals". The Eastern Librarian, September 1966
15. "Should Institutional Libraries Hold Import Licenses?" The Eastern Librarian, September 1966

==== Preface ====
1. Proceedings of the Fifth Annual Conference Volume of the Pakistan Library Association, November 1964
2. Proceedings of the Sixth Annual Conference Volume of the Pakistan Library Association, November 1965

==== Book reviews ====
1. Technical College Libraries: A Guide to Problems and Practice. by K. W. Neal, published by the author at 41, Wychbury Road, Finchfield, Wolverhampton, UK 1965, pp. 159. and The Eastern Librarian, vol. I No. 1966, pp. 49–50
2. The Pakistan National Bibliography: Annual volume 1962
3. Oriental Dictionaries: A Selected Bibliography
4. Southern Asia
5. Libraries in the East: An International and Comparative Study

==== Miscellaneous ====
1. Felix Carey: A Prisoner of Hope
2. Import of Reading Materials from Abroad
3. A Comparative Study of Copyright Laws
4. Annual Report: Pakistan Library Association

=== Bengali ===
==== Printing and publication ====
1. বাংলা মুদ্রণ ও প্রকাশনার গোড়ার কথা (Early History of Bengali Printing and Publication). Bangla Academy, Dhaka. 1371 (Bengali Year), pp. 206, illustrated Price. 5.00 taka (Bengali version)
2. বাংলা মুদ্রণ প্রকাশকে কেরী যুগ (Carry Period in Bengali Publication).Sahitya Protika. 5:1, 1368 (Bengali Year) pp. 153–268 (Bengali version)
3. বাংলা মুদ্রণের গোড়ার যুগের ইতিহাস (Early History of Bengali Printing) Gronthagar. 1369. pp. 243–268(Bengali version)

==== Library science ====
1. গ্রন্থাগার সম্প্রসারণ ও জনপ্রিয়তা বৃদ্ধির উপায় (Techniques of Library Extension and Popularization). Pak Samachar, 1956(Bengali version)
2. শিশু গ্রন্থাগার (Children Library). Boi. 2:10, 1959
3. গ্রন্থ: গ্রন্থাগারিক ও গ্রন্থবিক্রেতা (The Book: Librarian and Book Seller). Porikrom. 2:2 October 1962

==== History ====
1. ব্রহ্মদেশের ইতিহাসে মুসলমান (Muslim in Burmese History). Bangla Academy Potrika. 5:1, 1961. pp. 33–37.
