= Ranada Prasad Saha =

Bangladeshi philanthropist

Rai Bahadur Ranada Prasad Saha IA
- রণদা প্রসাদ সাহা
- R. P. Saha
- Pronunciation: [ɾɔnod̪a pɾɔʃad̪ ʃaɦa]
- Born: 15 November 1896; Savar, Bengal, British India
- Disappeared: 7 May 1971 (aged 74); Mirzapur, Dhaka, Bangladesh
- Other name: R. P. Saha
- Occupations: Businessman; entrepreneur; philanthropist; social worker; humanitarian; soldier
- Years active: 1915–1971
- Known for: Martyred Intellectual
- Movement: Swadeshi movement
- Awards: Independence Award (1978)
- Military career
- Allegiance: British Empire
- Branch: British Indian Army
- Service years: 1915–1920
- Rank: Jemadar
- Units: Bengal Ambulance Corps; 49th Bengalee Regiment
- Conflicts: World War I; Mesopotamian campaign
- Awards: British War Medal (1919); Sword of Honour (1919)

Rai Bahadur Ranada Prasad Saha (Bengali: রণদা প্রসাদ সাহা, Bengali pronunciation: [ɾɔnod̪a pɾɔʃad̪ ʃaɦa]; 15 November 1896 – May 1971), also known as R. P. Saha, was a Bengali businessman, entrepreneur, soldier, philanthropist, social worker, and humanitarian. He founded educational institutes like Bharateswari Homes, Kumudini College, Kumudini Hospital, and Debendra College. On 7 May 1971, the collaborators of the Pakistani army abducted RP Saha and his son Bhavani Prasad Saha from Mirzapur, and no news about their whereabouts has been unearthed till now.

== Early life ==
Shaha was born on 15 November 1896. Debendranath Podder, Shaha's father, originated from Mirzapur in Tangail subdivision of Mymensingh District. Shaha was born in his maternal uncle's house at Kachhur in Savar, near Dhaka. At the age of seven, he lost his mother, Kumudini Devi, who died of tetanus during childbirth. At the age of sixteen, he fled to Kolkata and initially worked as a canteen boy and hawker.

== Career ==
Shaha joined the Bengal Ambulance Corps as a medic and went to World War I. He left Kolkata in 1915 for Mesopotamia. He earned a medal and citation from King George the Fifth for his distinctive performance. Later, he got a commission as a Viceroy's commissioned officer in the 49 Bengal Regiment. He got a job with the Indian Railway department as a war veteran. He was honoured for saving some British officers from a camp fire. After serving for about five years, Shaha retired from the army and served the British railway as a ticket collector until 1931.

In 1932, he started his coal business. He later acquired a dealership for a coal business in Kolkata. In four years, he became a well-established coal businessman in Kolkata. He diversified his business into different sectors, including passenger launch, river transport, dockyard, food grain, and jute. He bought a ship named Bengal River. He was appointed one of the agents to buy food grains for the Government. He bought three powerhouses at Narayanganj, Mymensingh, and Comilla and owned the George Anderson Company of Narayanganj that used to make jute bales.

=== Philanthropy ===
In 1938, Shaha founded a charitable hospital in his native village, Mirzapur, on the river Lauhajang. On 27 July 1944, the hospital, which had 20 beds, was opened by Richard Casey, Baron Casey, the then Governor of Bengal. Saha named it Kumudini Hospital, after his mother Kumudini, whose suffering from lack of medical care inspired him to establish a hospital for the poor so that people, especially women, would not suffer the way his mother had. During the famine of 1943–1944, he maintained 275 gruel houses to feed the hungry for 8 months. As of 2010, the hospital has 750 beds and continues to serve the poor, providing them with free beds, meals, and treatment and charging only nominally for surgical procedures. If the hospital was flooded, Ranadaprasad made the doctors treat the patients on the top floors. He didn't care about death rates as many hospitals did and made sure no one was ever turned back. The Maternity Wing of the Dhaka Combined Military Hospital was established with his financial support.

To spread female education, he founded in 1942 a fully residential school at Mirzapur and named it Bharateswari Bidyapith after Bharateswari Devi, his grandmother. In 1945, this institution was renamed Bharateswari Homes. It has 1200 seats as of 2010 and is renowned for producing well-rounded, socially responsible students who have gone on to excel in their respective fields. Founded the Kumudini College at Tangail in 1943 and Debendra College at Manikganj District in 1944 to commemorate his mother and father, respectively. He also set up the Mirzapur Pilot Boys' School, Mirzapur Pilot Girls' School, and Mirzapur Degree College.

In 1947, Saha placed all his companies in a trust by the name of Kumudini Welfare Trust (KWT), with the earnings from the income-generating activities, such as a jute baling press and a river transportation business, being used to run the welfare activities.

The full extent of his philanthropic activities is not known even by his own family. In 1944, he donated BDT 250,000 to the Red Cross. His family often learns about them when they receive letters or calls from organizations informing them about some large donations he had made or some way in which he had helped them.

== Death ==
In April 1971, during the Liberation War of Bangladesh, despite a good working relationship with the Pakistani authorities as well as all preceding and successive governments, Saha, with his 26-year-old son Bhavani Prasad Saha, was picked up by the Pakistani occupation army. They returned home after about a week, but were picked up again a day later on 7 May, after which they were never heard from again. Saha's daughter-in-law, Srimati Saha, was widowed at the age of 20, four years into her marriage. Her only child, son Rajiv, was three years old at the time. The death of Ranada Prasad Saha remained a mystery, as his body was never found, and neither was his son's.

== Awards and honours ==
In appreciation of his humanitarian work, the British government conferred on Saha the title of Rai Bahadur. In 1978, he was posthumously awarded the Independence Award by the government of Bangladesh in recognition of his social work.

=== State honours ===
- Bangladesh:
  - Independence Day Award
- United Kingdom:
  - British War Medal
