= Kiran Chandra Roy =

Bangladeshi folk singer

- Genres: Baul
- Occupation: Playback singer
- Instrument: vocals

Kiran Chandra Roy is a Bangladeshi Baul folk singer. In 1997, he won Bangladesh National Film Award for Best Male Playback Singer and the BACHSAS Best Singer Award for his performance in the film Dukhai. He is also a lyricist and music composer.

== Background and education ==
Roy took formal music lessons from Khandaker Nurul Alam for 14 years. He took part in the first Bangladesh folklore workshop. He was a student of Bengali literature at the University of Dhaka and Jagannath University.

As of 2005, Roy released 15 solo albums and rendered playback in over 20 films.

== Albums ==
- Kon Kaal-e Tor Hobe Dishe (2014)
