= Bulbul Chowdhury =

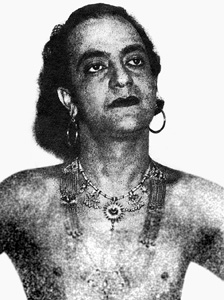
- Born: Rashid Ahmed Chowdhury; 1 January 1919; Chunati village, Lohagara Upazila, Chittagong, Bengal Presidency, British India (Former Satkania Upazila, Chittagong (present Lohagara Upazila), Bangladesh)
- Died: 17 May 1954 (aged 35); Calcutta, India
- Education: Scottish Church College; University of Calcutta
- Occupation: Artist/Dancer
- Spouse: Begum Afroza Bulbul
- Children: Shahid, Nargis, Fareed

Bulbul Chowdhury (1 January 1919 – 17 May 1954), real name Rashid Ahmed Chowdhury, was a Bengali dancer of British India, and later East Pakistan. He is primarily regarded as a pioneer of modern dance in Bangladesh, as a founding figure of dance among the conservative Muslim community.

== Early life and education ==
Chowdhury was born in Chunati village Under Satkania Upazila in what is now Lohagara Upazila, Chittagong, on 1 January 1919. His father, Mohammed Azamullah, was an inspector (later promoted to Deputy Superintendent of Police) in the then Bengal Police Service during British Reign. His maternal grandfather, Munshi Fazar Ali Dewan, was a lawyer of Calcutta High Court who also practiced at Chittagong. Chowdhury was home tutored in Arabic and Persian. Later he would attend the Howrah Primary School, and the Manikganj High School from where he matriculated in 1934. He earned IA from Calcutta Presidency College in 1936. He had later earned Bachelor of Arts degree from the Scottish Church College in 1938, and Master of Arts in arts from the University of Calcutta in 1943.

During the course of his secondary and graduate education in Calcutta, he came in contact with reputed artists, like Santosh Chandra, the sarod player, the composer Timir Baran Bhattacharya, and dancers Uday Shankar and Sadhana Bose. These contacts spurred his desire to excel as a dancer. He got his break in 1936, when he was given the chance to perform with danseuse Sadhana Bose in the Rabindra Nritya Natya Kach O Devajani. To avoid the conservative gaze of contemporary conservative Muslims, he took the pseudonym Bulbul Chowdhury. In 1937, he also helped in founding the Oriental Fine Arts Association.

== Career ==
Following the outbreak of the World War II, in January 1940, Chowdhury came to Dhaka with his troupe and performed a number of dance dramas. Back in Calcutta, he established Calcutta Culture Centre on 31 March 1941. During the World War II, he moved to Chittagong and worked at different places from 1943 to 1947. During 1950–1952, he performed in dance concerts in the unified Pakistan. In 1953, with his troupe, he visited Europe in countries including Britain, Ireland, Holland, Belgium and France.

Chowdhury was declared as the national dance artist of Pakistan in 1949. Bulbul Chowdhury played a crucial role in popularizing dance in East Pakistan's Bengali Muslim society. After settling in Dhaka following the partition of India, he creatively merged classical dance forms with themes from Muslim history and culture. Drawing from Kathakali, Bharatanatyam, Kathak, and Manipuri traditions, he developed unique dance styles. He incorporated classical mudras(postures) and rasas(sentiments) into performances like Chand Sultana, Anarkali, and Dream of Hafiz made him pioneer a distinct form of Muslim dance. By situating dance as part of the Mughal tradition, he challenged conservative Muslim attitudes towards dance, and helped in making dance gain social respectability and popularity.

Chowdhury wrote a novel Prachi which was published in 1942. He also wrote a number of short stories.

== Personal life ==
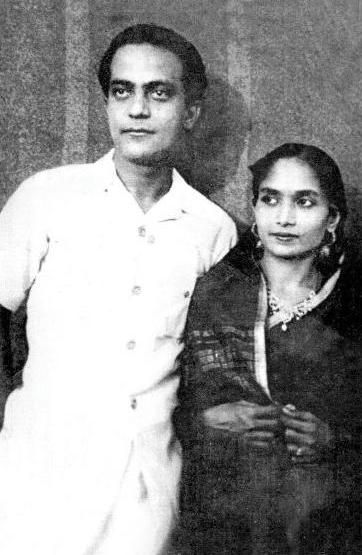
Chowdhury with his wife Afroza Bulbul

Chowdhury was married to Afroza Bulbul Chowdhury. She was a dancer and actress. She died in 1990.

== Death and legacy ==
On 17 May 1954, at the age of 35, Chowdhury died from cancer in Calcutta. After his death, Afroza, Chowdhury's wife, founded the Bulbul Institute of Culture in Karachi and the Bulbul Academy for Fine Arts (BAFA) in Dhaka on 17 May 1955. BAFA is also known as Bulbul Lalitakala Academy. It is an institution of fine arts that was established in popularizing dance among conservative Bengali Muslims. Afroza wrote Sundor Ei Prithibi Amar, a memoir on Chowdhury.

Chowdhury was honored posthumously with Pride of Performance award by the Pakistan government in 1959 and Independence Day Award by the Bangladesh government in 1984.
