= S A Jinnah Kabir =

Bangladeshi politician

- এস এ জিন্নাহ কবীর

Member of the Bangladesh Parliament for Manikganj-1
- Incumbent
- Assumed office 17 February 2026
- Preceded by: Salauddin Mahmud

Personal details
- Born: 1 October 1960 (age 65) Shivalaya Upazila, Manikganj District
- Party: Bangladesh Nationalist Party

S A Jinnah Kabir is a Bangladeshi politician of the Bangladesh Nationalist Party. He is currently serving as a member of parliament from Manikganj-1 .

== Early life ==
Kabir was born on 1 October in 1960 at Shivalaya Upazila under Manikganj District.
