= Khandaker Delwar Hossain =

Bangladeshi politician

Khondkar Delwar Hossain

7th General Secretary of Bangladesh Nationalist Party
- In office 3 September 2007 – 16 March 2011
- Chairperson: Khaleda Zia
- Preceded by: Abdul Mannan Bhuiyan
- Succeeded by: Mirza Fakhrul Islam Alamgir

5th & 7th Chief Whip of Parliament
- In office 28 October 2001 – 27 October 2006
- Speaker: Jamiruddin Sircar
- Preceded by: Abul Hasnat Abdullah
- Succeeded by: Md Abdus Shahid
- In office 5 April 1991 – 30 March 1996
- Speaker: Abdur Rahman Biswas; Sheikh Razzaque Ali
- Preceded by: M. A. Sattar
- Succeeded by: Abul Hasnat Abdullah

Member of Parliament for Manikganj-1
- In office 5 April 1991 – 27 October 2006
- Preceded by: Mohammad Siddiqur Rahman
- Succeeded by: A. B. M. Anowarul Haque

Personal details
- Born: 1 February 1933 Manikganj District, Bengal Presidency, British India
- Died: 16 March 2011 (aged 78) Singapore City, Singapore
- Party: Bangladesh Nationalist Party
- Relatives: Khandkar Manwar Hossain (brother)
- Education: University of Dhaka
- Occupation: Politician
- Awards: Ekushey Padak (2005)

Khondkar Delwar Hossain (1 February 1933 – 16 March 2011) was a Bangladesh Nationalist Party politician. He served as the secretary general of the party. He was elected five times as a Member of Parliament from constituency Manikganj-1 (Ghior-Doulatpur).

Delwar was awarded Ekushey Padak in 2005 by the government of Bangladesh.

== Early life ==
Hossain was born in Khirai Pachuria Village of Ghior Upazila, Manikganj District, East Bengal, British India on 1 February 1933. His father, Khondakar Abdul Hamid, was an alim and his mother was Aktara Khatoon. He graduated from Manikganj Government High School and Government Debendra College in 1947 and 1949 respectively.

Hossain completed his bachelor in economics at the University of Dhaka in 1953. He had participated in the Bengali Language movement. He obtained his law degree from the University of Dhaka in 1955. He started his political career through the Bengali language movement in 1952. He campaigned for the Jukta Front candidate in the 1954 election.

== Career ==
Hossain took a teaching job at Murari Chand College in Sylhet after completion of his studies in the economics department. He joined the Manikganj subdivisional bar to start his legal practice. In 1957, he joined the National Awami Party led by Abdul Hamid Khan Bhashani. In 1964, he served as the chief of the Manikganj subdivision election monitoring committee for Fatima Jinnah, the Combined Opposition Party candidate.

Hossain was elected president of the National Awami Party unit in Manikganj in 1965. He participated in the Six point movement against the government of Pakistan. He also participated in protests against President Ayub Khan. In the 1970 Pakistani general election he stood as a nominee of the National Awami Party faction led by Muzaffar Ahmed. Hossain worked as an organizer in the Bangladesh Liberation War and was a Revolutionary Command Council member in Manikganj.

In 1978, Hossain joined Military dictator President Ziaur Rahman's political party, the Jatiyatabadi Ganatantrik Dal. He was made convenor of the party in Manikganj District. After the Bangladesh Nationalist Party, the successor to the Dal, was created, he was elected chairman of the party in Manikganj District in 1979. He was elected member of parliament in 1979 from Manikganj-1. From 1979 to 1981, he was a member of the Dhaka University Senate. He was the vice-president of Bangladesh Samabaya Bank Limited from 1979 to 1982.

In the 1980s, Hossain campaigned against strongman President Hussain Mohammad Ershad.

Hossain was appointed a member of the National Standing Committee of the Bangladesh Nationalist Party in 1985. He was re-elected member of parliament in 1991 from Manikganj-1.

Hossain was re-elected in parliament in the February 1996 Bangladeshi general election and the June 1996 Bangladeshi general election from Manikganj-1. He was appointed chief whip of the opposition party.

Hossain was re-elected in parliament from Manikganj-1 in the 2001 Bangladeshi general election. He was appointed the chief whip. His house was raided by Bangladesh Army during Operation Clean Heart.

After former Prime Minister and chairperson of the Bangladesh Nationalist Party, Khaleda Zia, was detained on 3 September 2007 she expelled general secretary Abdul Mannan Bhuiyan and replaced him with Hossain. She had made those changes through writing letters to Abdul Mannan Bhuiyan, Ashraf Hossain, and Khandaker Delwar Hossain on the eve of her arrest. She was detained by the caretaker government which had come to power and declared emergency on 11 January 2007. The caretaker government had also filed six corruption cases against Hossain.

In September 2007, Hossain was the general secretary of a pro-Khaleda fraction of the Bangladesh Nationalist Party and Abdul Mannan Bhuiyan was leader of the pro-reform fraction.

Rapid Action Battalion officials anonymously accused Hossain's son of being involved in the Ya ba trade to The Daily Star. The Daily Star would later admit it wrote articles against politician during this time using information supplied by Directorate General of Forces Intelligence and was not verified. On 31 October 2007, Hossain resigned from the post of secretary general of the Bangladesh Nationalist Party from BIRDEM where he was under treatment. He had alleged a group was threatening him and his family which is why he had to resign. He was replaced by retired Major Hafiz Uddin Ahmed.

Hossain's son was arrested on 1 November 2007 by Rapid Action Battalion. He was accused of renting his guns to criminals. Police also said they were six cases against him from 2005 related to carjacking and extortion.

In February 2008, acting chairperson of the Bangladesh Nationalist Party M Saifur Rahman, was trying to negotiate with Hossain through Rizvi Ahmed to reunite the pro-reform and pro-Khaleda fractions of the party. In March 2008, he went to Singapore on a medical trip.

In April 2008, Hossain demanded the resignation of all three commissioners of Bangladesh Election Commission including A. T. M. Shamsul Huda for the Bangladesh Nationalist Party to contest the next parliamentary elections. Hossain stated that Khaleda Zia needed to be released from prison to hold a fair election. He made major concessions from the caretaker government to participate in the elections despite Khaleda Zia asking him to take a less confrontational stance. He also worked as a lawyer for Khaleda Zia. His son was arrested from jail gate after securing bail by Motijheel police.

Hossain was reappointed general secretary of the Bangladesh Nationalist Party on 8 December 2009. He founded Khandakar Nurul Hossain Law Academy, Khondokar Delwar Hossain College, and Pachuria Madrasa in Manikganj. He was the principal of Khandakar Nurul Hossain Law Academy. The Communist Party of Bangladesh criticized Hossain for his comments against the 1972 constitution of Bangladesh. He was summoned before the all-party parliamentary probe body on allegations of embezzling funds from the parliament. He had refused to return money from Parliament Members' Club as he claimed he had taken the three hundred thousand BDT following the rules of the club.

Hossain accused government activists of attacking Bangladesh Nationalist Party politicians and their properties across Bangladesh since Awami League won the election in 2009. In June 2010, Hossain gave the official response of the opposition Bangladesh Nationalist Party to the national budget describing it as ambitious but difficult to implement. He sought time from the Anti-Corruption Commission to respond to allegations of embezzling from the Jatiya Sangsad funds. The Commission started its investigation after the parliament forwarded its investigation to the commission and requested further investigation into the matter. Police obstructed a human chain of Hossain in front of the Jatiya Press Club which led to the death of one party activist. He asked the government to take steps to prevent the construction of the Tipaimukh dam by India.

== Personal life ==
Hossain's son, Khondaker Abdul Hamid Dablu, was nominated by the Bangladesh Nationalist Party to contest the 2018 Bangladesh general election from Manikganj-1. His other son, Khandaker Akhter Hamid Khan Paban, was convicted of assaulting police officers during protests in 2018.

== Death ==
Hossain died on 16 March 2011 at the age of 78 in Mount Elizabeth Hospital in Singapore City. ABM Khairul Haque, chief justice of Bangladesh, attended his Janaza at the Bangladesh High Court. Mujahidul Islam Selim, Syed Ashraful Islam, Mahbubul Alam Hanif, Rashed Khan Menon, A.B.M. Ruhul Amin Howlader, Md. Abdus Shahid, Zainul Abdin Farooque, Moudud Ahmed, Jamiruddin Sircar among others attended his funeral.
