= A. B. M. Anowarul Haque =

Bangladeshi politician (1949–2026)

- এবিএম আনোয়ারুল হক

Member of Bangladesh Parliament
- In office 2008–2014
- Preceded by: Khandaker Delwar Hossain
- Succeeded by: Naimur Rahman

Personal details
- Born: 1944 Manikganj District, East Bengal, Pakistan
- Died: 5 April 2026 (aged 81–82) Dhaka, Bangladesh
- Party: Bangladesh Awami League

A. B. M. Anowarul Haque (1949 – 5 April 2026) was a Bangladesh Awami League politician who was a member of parliament for Manikganj-1.

== Life and career ==
Anowarul Haque was born in Manikganj District in 1949. He was elected to parliament from Manikganj-1, a constituency comprising Daulatpur, Ghior, and Shivalaya upazilas, as a Bangladesh Awami League candidate in 2008.

Haque died at a hospital in Shyamoli, Dhaka on 5 April 2026.
