= Manikganj-1 =

Parliamentary constituency of Bangladesh

Coordinates: 23.84°N 89.82°E

- Constituency for the Jatiya Sangsad
- District: Manikganj District
- Division: Dhaka Division
- Electorate: 384,610 (2018)

Current constituency
- Created: 1984
- Party: Bangladesh Nationalist Party
- Member: S A Jinnah Kabir
- ← 167 Kishoreganj-6 169 Manikganj-2 →

Manikganj-1 is a constituency represented in the Jatiya Sangsad (National Parliament) of Bangladesh since 2026 by S A Jinnah Kabir of the Bangladesh Nationalist Party.

== Boundaries ==
The constituency encompasses Daulatpur, Ghior, and Shivalaya upazilas.

== History ==
The constituency was created in 1984 from the Dhaka-1 constituency when the former Dhaka District was split into six districts: Manikganj, Munshiganj, Dhaka, Gazipur, Narsingdi, and Narayanganj.

Ahead of the 2008 general election, the Election Commission redrew constituency boundaries to reflect population changes revealed by the 2001 Bangladesh census. The 2008 redistricting altered the boundaries of the constituency.

== Members of Parliament ==
Election	Member	Party
1986	Mohammad Siddiqur Rahman	Jatiya Party
1988	Mohammad Siddiqur Rahman	Jatiya Party
1991	Khandaker Delwar Hossain	Bangladesh Nationalist Party
Feb 1996	Khandaker Delwar Hossain	Bangladesh Nationalist Party
Jun 1996	Khandaker Delwar Hossain	Bangladesh Nationalist Party
2001	Khandaker Delwar Hossain	Bangladesh Nationalist Party
2008	A. B. M. Anowarul Haque	Awami League
2014	Naimur Rahman Durjoy	Awami League
2018	Naimur Rahman Durjoy	Awami League
2024	Salauddin Mahmud	Independent
2026	S. A. Jinnah Kabir	Bangladesh Nationalist Party

== Elections ==
=== Elections in the 2020s ===
General election 2026: Manikganj-1
Party	Candidate	Votes	%	±%
BNP	S. A. Jinnah Kabir	137,776		
Independent	Md. Tozammel Haque	77,818		
Jamaat	Abu Bakar Siddique			
Independent	Md. Abdul Ali Bepari			
IAB	Md. Khorshed Alam			
Majority		59,958		
Turnout				
Registered electors		461,942		
BNP gain from Independent				

=== Elections in the 2010s ===
General Election 2014: Manikganj-1
Party	Candidate	Votes	%	±%
AL	Naimur Rahman	81,127	85.0	+30.4
Jatiya Samajtantrik Dal-JSD	Afzal Hossain Khan Zoki	14,300	15.0	N/A
Majority		66,827	70.0	+53.4
Turnout		95,427	27.8	−61.8
AL hold				

=== Elections in the 2000s ===
General Election 2008: Manikganj-1
Party	Candidate	Votes	%	±%
AL	ABM Anowarul Haque	147,322	54.6	+15.2
BNP	Khandaker Delwar Hossain	102,412	37.9	−18.6
Independent	Tojammel Haque	20,228	7.5	N/A
Majority		44,910	16.6	−0.5
Turnout		269,962	89.6	+14.9
AL gain from BNP				

General Election 2001: Manikganj-1
Party	Candidate	Votes	%	±%
BNP	Khandaker Delwar Hossain	85,447	56.5	+18.0
AL	Abdus Salam	59,541	39.4	+10.7
IJOF	Md. Afzal Hossain	5,308	3.5	N/A
KSJL	Mehedi Rafi	530	0.4	N/A
CPB	Afsar Uddin Ahmmed	188	0.1	N/A
Jatiya Party (M)	Md. Khandokar Azim Mia	86	0.1	N/A
Majority		25,906	17.1	+7.3
Turnout		151,100	74.7	−3.3
BNP hold				

=== Elections in the 1990s ===
General Election June 1996: Manikganj-1
Party	Candidate	Votes	%	±%
BNP	Khandaker Delwar Hossain	44,502	38.5	−8.6
AL	AM Saidur Rahman	33,161	28.7	+8.2
JP(E)	Abdul Malek	29,929	25.9	+15.6
Bangladesh Samajtantrik Dal (Mahbub)	Afzal Hossain Khan Zoki	3,466	3.0	N/A
Jamaat	Tazul Islam	1,981	1.7	−4.1
IOJ	Md. Baki Billah	1,475	1.3	N/A
Independent	Dulal Kumar Biswas	532	0.5	+0.4
Gano Forum	Md. Fazlur Rahman Mollah	290	0.3	N/A
Zaker Party	Md. Safiuddin Biswas	253	0.2	−1.3
Majority		11,341	9.8	−16.8
Turnout		115,589	78.0	+22.2
BNP hold				

General Election 1991: Manikganj-1
Party	Candidate	Votes	%	±%
BNP	Khandaker Delwar Hossain	46,817	47.1	
AL	Siddiqur Rauf Khan	20,415	20.5	
JP(E)	Afzal Hossain	10,214	10.3	
Independent	Nurul Amin	6,701	6.7	
Jamaat	Tazul Islam	5,736	5.8	
Independent	Aziz Ullah	1,720	1.7	
Independent	Babu Miah	1,669	1.7	
Zaker Party	Lutfar Rahman Khan	1,515	1.5	
JSD	Ansur Rahman	1,340	1.3	
CPB	A. Rahman Dorji Minu	1,277	1.3	
Bangladesh Janata Party	A T M Zahir Alam Khan Lodi	1,246	1.3	
Independent	Asar Uddin	383	0.4	
Independent	Begum Taufiqa Karim	176	0.2	
Independent	Dulal Kumar Biswas	147	0.1	
Independent	Md. Abul Kasem	63	0.1	
Majority		26,402	26.6	
Turnout		99,419	55.8	
BNP gain from JP(E)				
