= Terosree massacre =

Event during the Bangladesh Genocide

Coordinates: 23.9226°N 89.8771°E

The Terosree massacre was the mass murder of 43 civilians by the Pakistan Army in the Manikganj District during the Bangladesh Liberation war. The name comes from the local Terosree Zamindari estate. The Hindu zamindar of Terosree, Siddheswar Prasad Roy Chowdhury, was among those murdered.

== History ==
On 22 November 1971, the Pakistani Army killed 43 people in Terosree village in Ghior Upazila, Manikganj District during Bangladesh Liberation war. The Pakistani Army was aided by the Islamist paramilitary groups Al-Badr, Al-Shams, and the Razakars. The zamindar of Terosree, Siddheswar Prasad Roy Chowdhury, and the principal of Terosree College, Atiar Rahman, were among those murdered. Manikganj District was captured by the Indian Army and the Mukti Bahini from the Pakistan Army on 13 December 1971.

== Remembrance ==
A monument has been constructed in Terosree village in memory of the victims. The Terosree Martyrs Memorial Committee carries out annual events marking the massacre.
