= Samsuddin Ahmed =

Bangladesh politician (1945–2020)

- সামসুদ্দিন আহমেদ

Member of Parliament for Manikganj-2
- In office November 2001 – 27 October 2006
- Preceded by: Harunur Rashid Khan Monno
- Succeeded by: S. M. Abdul Mannan

Personal details
- Born: 6 March 1945; Manikganj, Bengal Presidency, British India
- Died: 20 December 2020 (aged 75); Dhaka, Bangladesh
- Political party: Bangladesh Awami League

Samsuddin Ahmed (6 March 1945 – 20 December 2020) was a Bangladesh Awami League politician and a Jatiya Sangsad member representing the Manikganj-2 constituency during 2001–2006.

== Background ==
Ahmed was born in Mirzaganj, Harirampur Upazila, Manikganj District in the then British India in 1945. He graduated from Jagannath College.

== Career ==
Ahmed was elected to parliament from Manikganj-2 as an independent candidate in 2001. He joined Bangladesh Awami League in 2006.

He died on 20 December 2020, from COVID-19, during the COVID-19 pandemic in Bangladesh.
