= M. Shafiullah =

Bangladeshi diplomat

Ambassador of Bangladesh to Libya
- In office 1995–2001
- Succeeded by: AFM Golam Hossain

Personal details
- Education: University of Dhaka

M. Shafiullah is a retired diplomat and a former ambassador of Bangladesh to Libya. He was a senior research fellow at the Bangladesh Enterprise Institute. He is a former press officer of President Sheikh Mujibur Rahman, the founding president of Bangladesh. He is a director of the Centre for Governance Studies, a think-tank.

== Early life ==
Shafiullah has a master's in psychology from the University of Dhaka.

== Career ==
During the Bangladesh Liberation War in 1971, Shafiullah was stuck in West Pakistan. He returned to independent Bangladesh by crossing the border with Afghanistan. He served as the press officer of President Sheikh Mujibur Rahman from 1972 to 1975.

Shafiullah was the director-general for Middle East and North Africa at the Ministry of Foreign Affairs. In 1991, after Saddam Hussein invaded Kuwait, he worked on repatriating 70 thousand Bangladeshi expats from Kuwait.

Shafiullah was made ambassador of Bangladesh to Libya in 1995. He was concurrently accredited to Malta, State of Palestine, and Tunisia. He tried in 2001. He said Afghanistan joined SAARC with the support of the United States and indirect support of India.

Shafiullah was a senior research fellow at the Bangladesh Enterprise Institute from 2002. He was the project coordinator of the Charting a Roadmap for Transition to Business-to-Business e-Commerce project of the Bangladesh Enterprise Institute. He praised the 2018 Bangladesh road-safety protests and the 2018 Bangladesh quota reform movement. He has been critical of Bangladesh-India relations describing it as unbalanced and in favor of India.
