= Mahmudur Rahman =

Bangladeshi newspaper editor

- মাহমুদুর রহমান (Bengali)
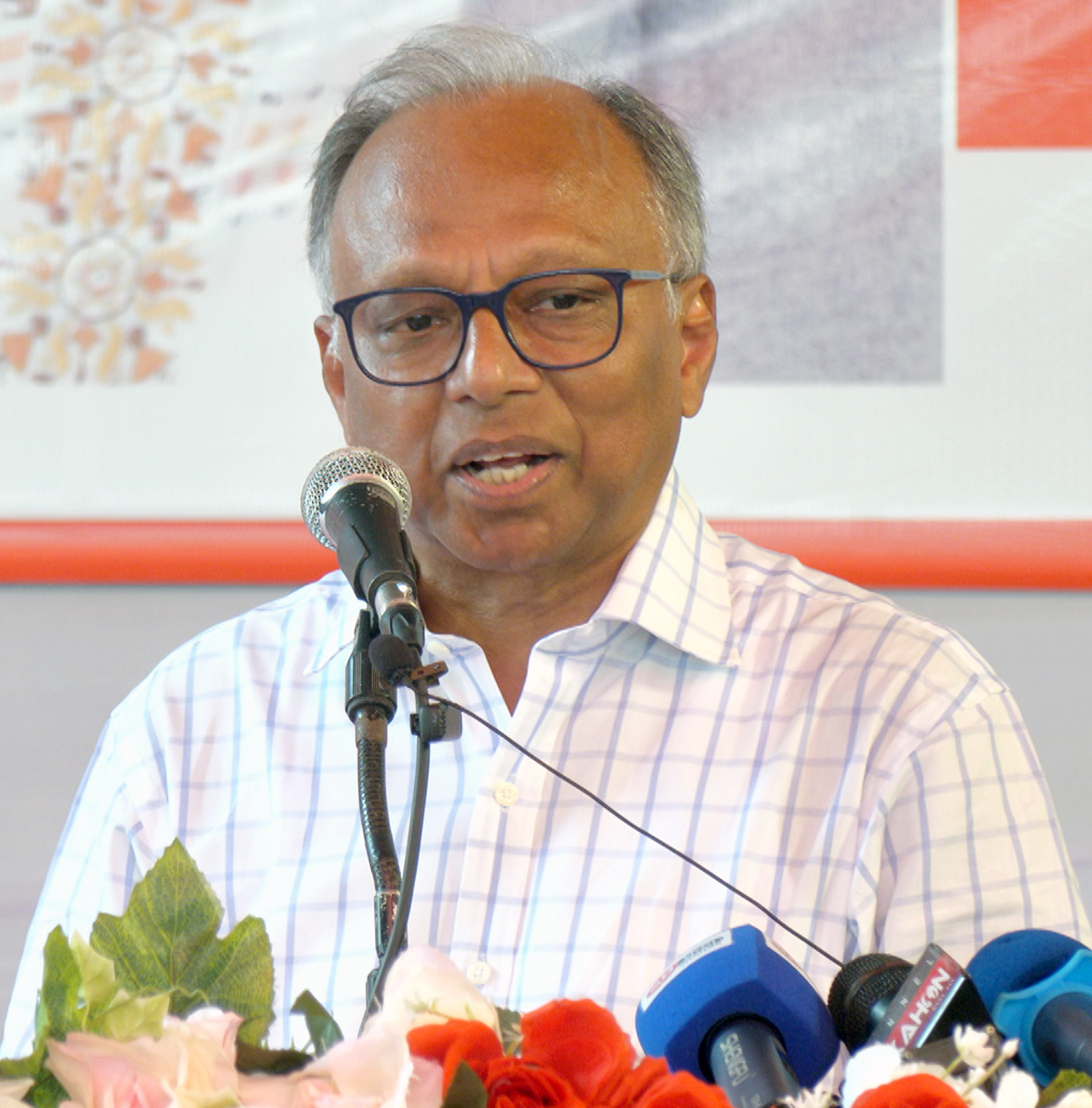
- Mahmudur Rahman in 2024
- Born: 6 July 1953 (age 73); Comilla, Tippera District, East Bengal, Pakistan
- Citizenship: Pakistan (1953–1971); Bangladesh (from 1971)
- Education: BUET (BChE) IBA, DU (MBA)
- Known for: Editor of Amar Desh
- Spouse: Firoza Khan
- Parent: Mahmuda Begum (mother)
- Relatives: Harunur Rashid Khan Monno (father-in-law); Afroza Khanam Rita (sister-in-law)
- Awards: Ekushey Padak (2025)

Mahmudur Rahman (Bengali: মাহমুদুর রহমান; born 6 July 1953) is the owner and editor of the Bengali daily Amar Desh in Bangladesh also an author, engineer and businessman. A strong critic of the Awami League government since 2008, he has faced over 50 defamation and sedition charges. He is the only person sentenced for contempt by the Supreme Court of Bangladesh, with human rights groups labeling the government's actions against him as judicial harassment.

== Early life ==
Rahman was born in Comilla, East Bengal, Pakistan. His mother, Mahmuda Begum, passed away at the age of 87 on July 6, 2025.

== Education ==
He received his Bachelor of Chemical Engineering in 1977 from Bangladesh University of Engineering and Technology. After working in engineering in Japan, he returned to earn a graduate diploma in ceramic engineering. He also earned an M.B.A. from the Institute of Business Administration, Dhaka University.

== Career ==
Mahmudur Rahman, a former operational engineer, founded Artisan Ceramics Limited in 1999. He chaired Bangladesh's National Investment Board, boosting foreign investment significantly. As Energy Adviser, he faced protests over fuel price hikes and environmental issues. Later, he acquired Amar Desh newspaper, transforming it into a leading opposition voice.

6-October-2024, Mahmudur Rahman in an exchange meeting with journalists at the premises of the National Press Club (2014)

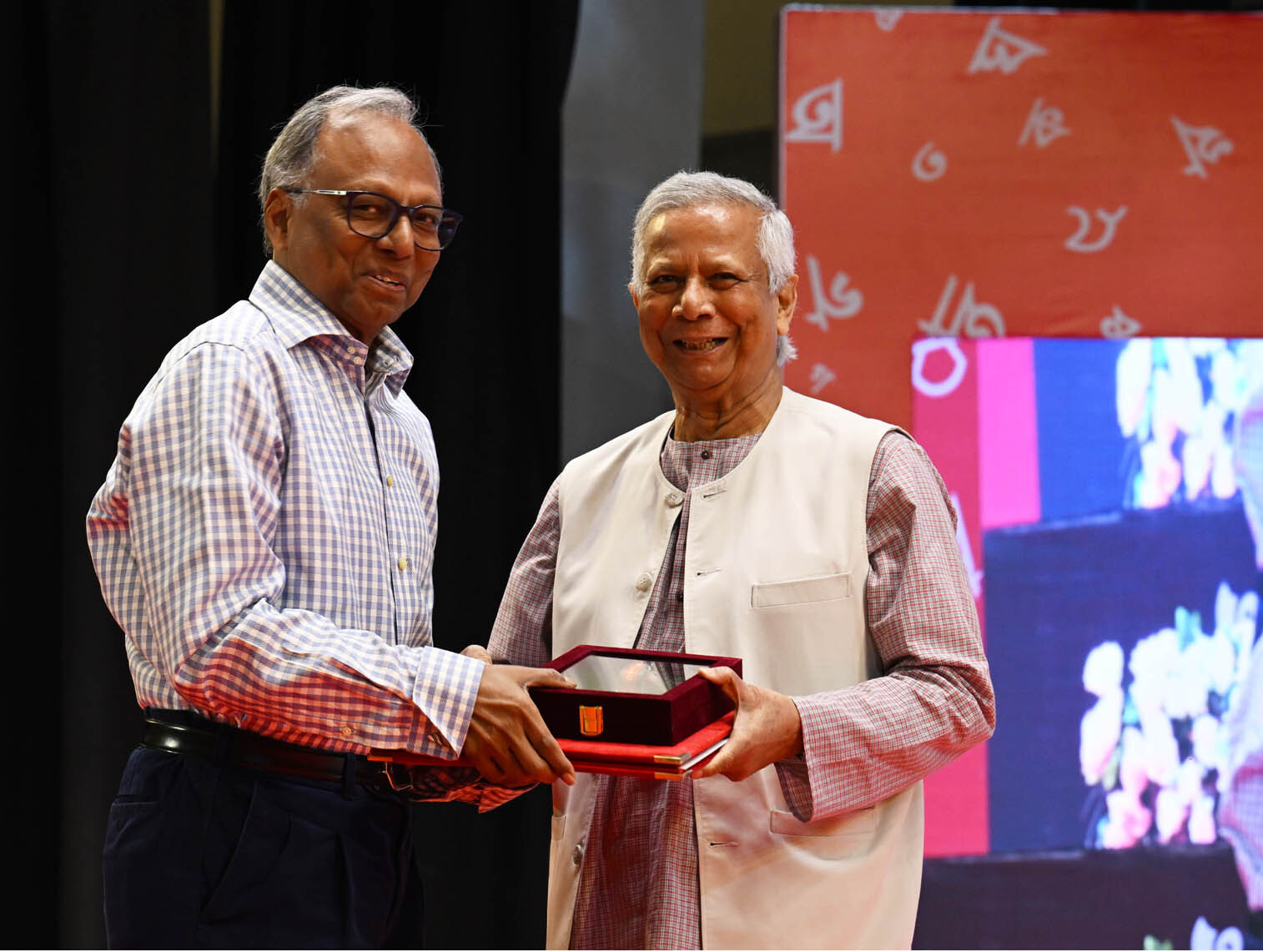
Rahman receives 2025 Ekushey Padak from Chief Advisor Muhammad Yunus.

=== Business career ===
Mahmudur Rahman started his career as an operational engineer at British Oxygen, a major British-owned gas company. He also worked in Monno Ceramics, Duncan Brothers, Shinepukur Ceramics, Beximco Group, and Padma Textile, including some years in Japan.

After returning to Bangladesh, Mahmudur Rahman started and developed his own company, Artisan Ceramics Limited in 1999. It was the first bone china plant in the country and a technological breakthrough. Artisan Ceramics was sold in 2013.

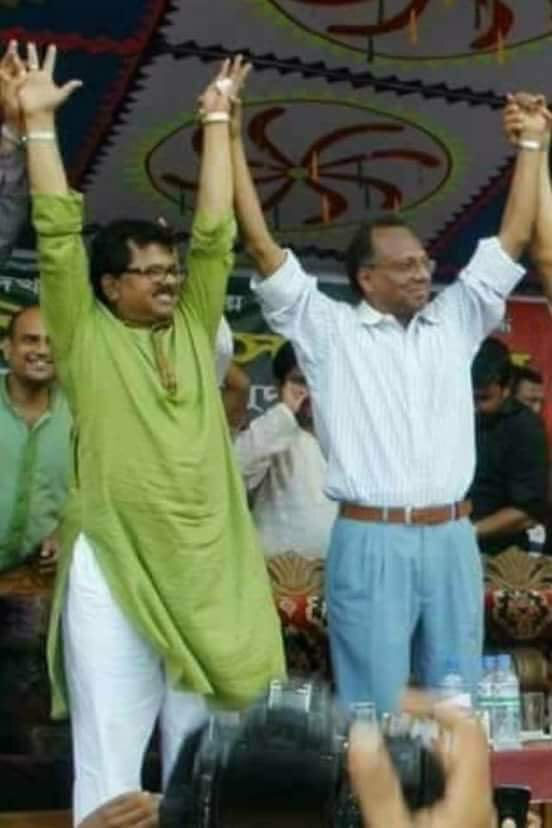
Mohammad Ilias Ali and Mahmudur Rahman during the 2011 protest against the Tipaimukh Dam

=== Political career ===
Mahmudur Rahman chaired the National Investment Board in Bangladesh from 2001, boosting foreign investment from $52 million to $460 million by 2004. In 2005, he became Energy Adviser, negotiating key deals with Cairn Energy and Vulcan Inc. His tenure faced protests over fuel price hikes and environmental issues. Amid political tensions in 2006, he was accused of election interference during a military takeover in 2007, reflecting the challenges of governance in a turbulent era.

==== National Investment Board ====
Mahmudur Rahman was appointed by the administration of Khaleda Zia as chair of the National Investment Board. In 2002, he described the obstacles to foreign investment in Bangladesh as the "five 'I's": "image, information, infrastructure, implementation and inefficiency" and committed the government to achieving change. He credited the opening of the power plant Meghna Energy Limited in Kanchpur, to the government's energy deregulation. Between 2002 and 2003, foreign investment in Bangladesh increased from $52 million to US$121 million, an increase which Mahmudur Rahman said was the greatest in South Asia. In 2004, the United Nations reported that foreign investment in Bangladesh had reached a record US$460 million.

Political unrest arose in 2004. On 21 August, grenade attacks at an opposition Awami League rally killed 20 and injured around 300 others. General strikes against Prime Minister Khaleda Zia's government were held regularly throughout the end of the year. Mahmudur Rahman criticized both sides, saying that such political violence and unrest threatened much-needed foreign investment, and the government had to provide security. He offered his resignation in December 2004, reportedly over a dispute with officials in the Prime Minister's Office, but Zia declined to accept it. Mahmudur Rahman continued in the post for the remainder of his "two-year contractual obligation".

Mahmudur Rahman's goal was to attract US$1 billion in investment to Bangladesh while in office. He said that Bangladesh's infrastructure needed improvement. The government encouraged foreign investment in infrastructure through a "build-own-transfer" model. In May 2005, Mahmudur Rahman announced a deal with the US company Vulcan Inc. to invest $1.6 billion in new power and fertiliser plants, projected to increase Bangladesh's energy capacity by nearly 50 percent.

In August 2005, Mahmudur Rahman sued five members of the Centre for Policy Dialogue, a private think tank, for defamation after they criticised his investment policy. He said they had made "disgraceful, false and fabricated statements". The Hindustan Times said the suit and issuance of related arrest warrants, was an example of "persecution of intellectuals critical of the government" and the persons sued were renowned in their field.

==== Energy Adviser ====
The June 2005 explosion at Niko Resources Tengratila Gas Field in Sunamganj District, was the second during the project to revive the Chattack field. Against accusations that Niko had bribed Energy Adviser Mosharraf Hossain, he resigned.

Mahmudur Rahman was named to succeed him. In August 2005, he announced completion of a deal with the British oil company Cairn Energy to explore oil and gas deposits offshore Bangladesh.

The following month, Mahmudur Rahman participated in talks for a transborder natural gas pipeline from Burma's Arakan State to India, to pass through Bangladesh. The deal was shelved in early October 2005 after Bangladesh asked for additional trade concessions, and Burma and India chose to develop a direct route between them. In 2006, Mahmudur Rahman accused Burma and India of having encroached on thousands of square miles of Bangladeshi territorial waters for natural gas exploration.

Mahmudur Rahman was involved in talks between the government and India's Tata Group in early 2006 over a $300 million proposal to build steel and fertiliser factories, as well as a power plant. After the talks were unsuccessful, Mahmudur Rahman opened talks with Pakistan's Dawood Group in August 2006 on a more modest $30 million deal.

In September 2005, Mahmudur Rahman announced a 16 percent increase in petrol prices to aid the government-owned Bangladesh Petroleum Corporation, due to the price increases for crude oil on world markets. The price hikes sparked protests in Dhaka, and the government adopted a five-day workweek to conserve energy. It expected that the private sector would follow the government example. In June 2006, Mahmudur Rahman announced an additional one-third increase in petrol prices, as well as a 10 percent increase in diesel and kerosene prices, one of the largest fuel-price hikes in Bangladesh's history.

In late August 2006, protesters demanded Mahmudur Rahman's resignation as energy adviser and burned him in effigy in response to plans by the British corporation Asia Energy (now Global Coal, GCM Resources) to develop an open-pit coal mine in Phulbari, Dinajpur district. Activists said that the mine would cause environmental damage, threaten water supply, and displace up to 120,000 residents of the area, including the Shantal indigenous peoples. On the first day of protests, police killed six persons and 300 were injured in a massive protest of 30,000 people outside the local Asia Energy offices. The protests spread and the next day, twenty people were injured. Students at Dhaka University joined the effort. An estimated 70,000 people in total joined the protests across the country. As of December 2010, the mine was still being protested and the government had not awarded a contract for its development.

In 2006, Mahmudur Rahman urged calm, saying, "This incident has sent the wrong message to foreign investors, which we cannot afford at all when we are struggling hard to woo more and more investment."

==== Caretaker government ====
Khaleda Zia's government ended in October 2006 and, under the constitution, elections are supposed to take place within three months, or January 2007. That fall there was a fierce struggle among the numerous parties, 14 of which were part of an Awami League-alliance and several were allied with the BNP. The caretaker government was trying to bring all parties to the table to settle election questions amidst rising tensions and violence. Arab News noted when reporting the late November 2006 incident below, that "At least 40 people were killed and hundreds injured in clashes between rival parties since late October."

As a former energy adviser, Mahmudur Rahman kept in touch with colleagues from the BNP in the government. On 24 November 2006, journalists and TV news reporters took photos of 44 BNP administration officials, some retired like Mahmudur Rahman and others incumbents, leaving Mahmudur Rahman's office after a midnight meeting; many tried to hide their faces. A spokesman from the Awami League said that the men were meeting to try to "rig" the scheduled January 2007 election for BNP and its allies. Mahmudur Rahman denied the charge, saying he was holding a "private party" for friends to see his new office. The Awami League (and allies) called for a boycott of the scheduled January 2007 elections, demanding electoral reform.

In January 2007, the military led by General Moeen took over the caretaker government, and imposed a state of emergency. According to the then Presidential Adviser and Minister Mukhlesur Rahman Chowdhury, Army Chief, Lt. Gen. Moeen was the main force in the military intervention and declaration by President Iajuddin Ahmed of a state of emergency on 11 January 2007. Moeen and his associates selected that illegal government's chief advisor, Fakhruddin Ahmed. Iauddin Ahmed continued as president. In March 2007, the caretaker government charged Khaleda Zia's two sons with corruption. In April, it announced a ban on politicians visiting the former prime minister, under the conditions of the emergency. The CTG also charged some of Zia's ministers with corruption. Also in April 2007, the CTG sued Sheikh Hasina, leader of the Awami League, for graft.

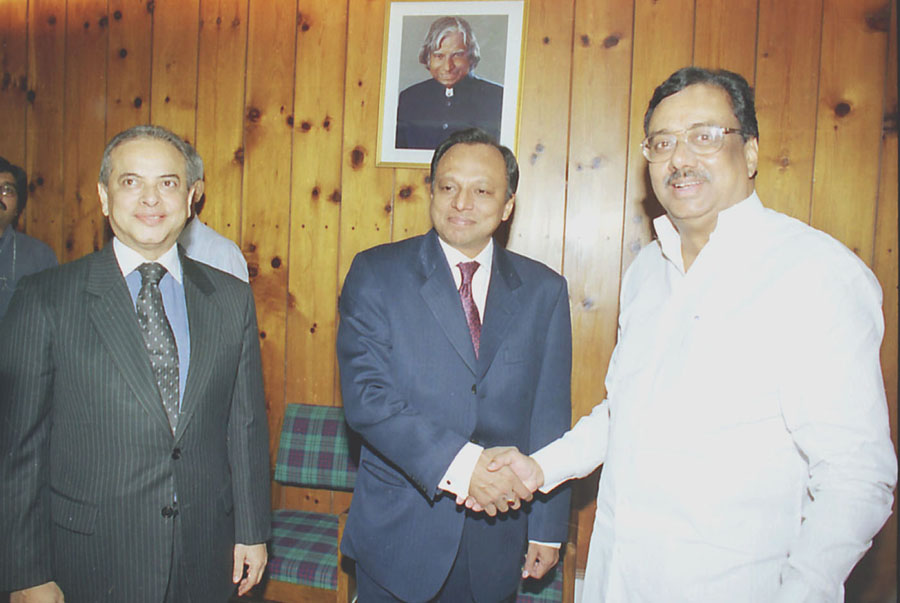
Indian Minister of State for Commerce and Industry E.V.K.S. Elangovan meets a Trade delegation from Bangladesh led by the Mr. Mahmudur Rahman.

On 31 March 2007, the Establishment Ministry (under the caretaker government) announced that it had completed a three-person inquiry into the actions of some of the senior officials at the November 2006 meeting with ex-energy advisor Mahmudur Rahman. As a result, it reassigned 13 men out of office to positions as "officers on special duty" (OSD). Three of the men were "joint secretaries, four deputy secretaries and six senior assistant secretaries."

The CTG in late 2008 began to prepare for an election that year. In October 2008, shortly before the December election, Mahmudur Rahman filed a complaint with the Anti-Corruption Commission, against its chair General Hasan Mashhud Chowdhury. Mahmudur Rahman accused the BNP appointee of having misappropriated 224.1 million taka in a money-laundering scheme. After an investigation, on 19 March 2009, an ACC internal committee dismissed the complaint as "baseless and unmotivated". It noted that Mahmudur Rahman had failed to appear personally before the committee to provide evidence.

The election was held on 29 December 2008. The Awami League and its Grand Alliance came to power with two-thirds of the seats in Parliament. In 2010, the Awami League government charged the 13 bureaucrats of what had become known as the "Uttara Conspiracy" with sedition. They received bail. At that time, eleven were still serving in the government and two had retired.

=== Newspaper career ===
In 2008, Mahmudur Rahman bought the ownership of the Bengali-language, daily newspaper Amar Desh, and was appointed acting editor. He has made it a leading opposition paper.

On 28 December 2008, the day before national elections, an Awami League committee chairman accused Mahmudur Rahman of collaborating to print fake ballot papers with his presses in order for BNP supporters to rig the election. The Awami League-coalition won the 2008 election by an overwhelming margin, winning two-thirds of the seats in Parliament. It had promised to set up an International Crimes Tribunal to prosecute war crimes during the Bangladesh Liberation War.

== Activism ==
=== South Asian Policy Initiative (SAPI) ===
South Asian Policy Initiative is a transnational research-based think-tank promoting research and policies that strengthen human rights and democracy in the South and Southeast Asian region. It is led by Bangladeshi pro-opposition figure and Amardesh newspaper editor Mahmudur Rahman. The think tank is registered and headquartered in Australia.

==== Objectives ====
The primary focus of SAPI is to undertake policy-relevant research and analysis that informs and influences decision-making processes related with human rights and democracy in the South Asian and Southeast Asian region.

==== Activities ====
On 10 September 2023, a cultural vigil was organised by the South Asian Policy Initiative (SAPI) and Global Voice for Humanity to commemorate the United Nations International Day of the Victims of Enforced Disappearance (August 30). The event was held at Campbelltown Civic Hall and featured the testimonies of families of victims of enforced disappearances in Bangladesh, including Tahsina Rushdi Luna, the wife of a prominent disappeared leader of the Bangladesh Nationalist Party (BNP) Ilias Ali, and Tahera Tasneem, sister of Barrister Mir Ahmad Bin Quasem. Other notable speakers included SAPI chairman Mahmudur Rahman and Pinaki Bhattacharya, an exiled Bangladeshi political analyst.

Earlier in 2022, SAPI organised a campaign and rally in front of the NSW parliament house on occasion of International Day of Victims of Enforced Disappearance, in presence of First Nation Representatives, and lead speaker senator David Shoebridge, a leader of the Australian Greens.

On 26 June 2023, SAPI organised a webinar to mark the United Nations' International Day in Support of Victims of Torture, which featured a keynote speech titled "Standing up for the victims of torture" by Mohammad Ashrafuzzaman, a prominent human rights defender and Program Coordinator at the Asian Legal Resources Centre.

In October 2023, SAPI published a report titled "Bangladesh Awami League: A Case Study of its Militant Politics and Crimes Against Humanity," which documented the extensive history of violent political crimes committed through direct involvement of affiliated organizations, individual leaders and policymakers associated with ruling political party Bangladesh Awami League. In December 2023, SAPI released a video documentary on Awami League corruption titled "Thieves of Dhaka."

== Legal disputes ==
On 2 October 2009, Amar Desh reported that the Bangladesh Telecommunication Regulatory Commission had hired Indian employees, and that their presence threatened state security. The BTRC sued the paper for defamation on 28 October, noting that the Indian nationals had been appointed by the United Nations, rather than the commission.

In January 2010, the energy minister, Tawfiq-e-Elahi Chowdhury, sued Amar Desh for defamation over a December 2009 article alleging that he and Sajeeb Wazed Joy Hasina, the son of Prime Minister Sheikh Hasina, had received bribes from Chevron Corporation to secure contracts in Bangladesh. Three days after the story was published, the reporter was physically attacked by unknown persons. Also in response to the article on Hasina and Chowdhury, Awami League members had already filed 24 defamation charges against Amar Desh before the energy minister did.

Reporters Without Borders reported that on 1 June 2010, the government sent more than 100 police to arrest Mahmudur Rahman and close down the paper's printing press. National media also carried news of the paper's shutdown and editors' arrest. According to Reporters without Borders, Mohammad Hasmat Ali, publisher of Amar Desh, the previous day had been taken by the National Security Intelligence, interrogated, and forced to sign two blank pieces of paper. NSI agents later filled these in with the following statements:

1. Ali claimed still to be the newspaper's publisher after having transferred ownership to Mahmudur Rahman's media company, and
2. he wanted to sue Mahmudur Rahman for fraud. The press organisation said that the NSI appeared to intend to "trap both men in order to have the newspaper's licence withdrawn under the 1973 press law."

Several days later, the leaders of around 25 newspapers in Bangladesh signed a letter which demanded that the ban on Amar Desh publication be rescinded. Different government entities filed a total of four charges against Mahmudur Rahman: two by police for an altercation that arose when they shut down the printing press and newspaper offices; one for sedition for allegedly publishing posters and publicity material for Hizb-ut-Tahrir, a banned Islamist group; and one for fraud based on his publisher's signed statement. Mahmudur Rahman was remanded into custody for eight days. On 12 June, the High Court stayed the ban on Amar Desh operations, allowing it to resume publication. On 17 June 2010, Mahmudur Rahman's attorneys released his statement asserting torture during police custody. Mahmudur Rahman was released on bail in mid-July.

On 12 October 2010, the government deferred the sedition case. Mahmudur Rahman was acquitted of the other charges, a verdict upheld by the Appeals Court.

In August 2010, the Supreme Court of Bangladesh sentenced Mahmudur Rahman to six months for contempt of court for a 21 April 2010 Amar Desh article, which said the top court was pro-government. Mahmudur Rahman is the only person ever sentenced for contempt by the Bangladesh Supreme Court. The Supreme Court had a separate, pending charge for contempt for a 10 May article but withdrew it.

International human rights groups described the government's cases against Amar Desh as "legal harassment". Reporters Without Borders released a statement saying,

The Awami League government is clearly unable to tolerate criticism from this opposition newspaper and, in particular, its coverage of the controversial award of energy contracts to foreign companies. Rahman was an advisor in these matters in the last BNP government and his revelations are damaging for the government.

On 17 March 2011, Mahmudur Rahman was freed from prison. Many national figures arrived to welcome his release, including the film maker Chashi Nazrul Islam, writer Farhad Mazhar, journalist Abdul Hye Shikdar, and former Inspector-General of Police M. A. Quayum.

=== Bangladesh International Crimes Tribunal ===
In fulfilment of its campaign promises, the Awami government initiated a Bangladesh International Crimes Tribunal to bring justice related to war crimes committed during the Bangladesh liberation war in 1971.

Less than a month after Mahmudur Rahman's release, on 28 March 2011 a judge issued an arrest order for him and two other journalists for defamation charges related to an April 2010 article reporting that certain Awami Party leaders of Kotalipara and their relatives were on the war crimes suspects' list of the International Crimes Tribunal. The judge issued the arrest order for the three journalists because they failed to appear in court; but they had notified him of an earlier case requiring them to be in a Dhaka court the same day. Journalist organisations criticized the arrest order, saying a person could not appear before two courts the same day. They said that the government was disregarding the 2 February 2011 legislation passed by Parliament, which had "nullified the provision of issuing arrest warrants against newsmen in defamation cases." By this time, Mahmudur Rahman had been subject to 49 legal cases under the Awami government, most for defamation.

On 14 December 2012, the government charged Mahmudur Rahman with sedition for publishing Skype conversations, "illegally hacked" (supposedly claimed by the then Bangladesh government) by other parties, between Justice Mohammed Nizamul Huq, chairman of Bangladesh's International Crimes Tribunal, and Ahmed Ziauddin, an international criminal law expert and war crimes activist based in Brussels. The discussions had to do with the work of the Tribunal, and the material was published also in The Economist and another Bangladesh media outlet. Nizamul Huq resigned shortly afterward because of the controversy. After charges were filed, Mahmudur Rahman avoided arrest by spending the next months in his newspaper's offices, leaving only to seek anticipatory bail.

In protesting the charges, Amnesty International said, "The government of Bangladesh must ensure that everyone, in particular journalists and editors, are free to express their views and opinion peacefully without being harassed, intimidated, detained or tortured."

The prosecutions and convictions by the International Tribunal have resulted in rising political tensions among some interests. Jamaat-e-Islami, the largest Islamist party, led a one-day strike that developed into violent riots when one of its top officials was convicted. The 2013 Shahbag protests, supported by many students and younger people, began 5 February 2013 in Dhaka after one of the men convicted of war crimes was sentenced to life imprisonment rather than death, as two others were. Protesters demanded that persons convicted of war crimes be sentenced to death, and Jamaat-e-Islami be banned from politics because of the violence of its followers. On 24 February, protest leaders called for the arrest of Mahmudur Rahman, accusing him of inciting communal violence and sedition because of Amar Desh coverage of bloggers and activists. Demonstrators said Mahmudur Rahman had reported "fabricated" news.

On 26 February, Home Minister Muhiuddin Khan Alamgir met with protesters and pledged to take measures against Mahmudur Rahman. In response, the editor has called the Shahbag movement "nothing but fascism". In a 2013 interview earlier in February with Prime News, Mahmudur Rahman had said,

Whenever the Awami League came to power it tried its best to gag the voice of media. After the country's independence, during 1972–75 period, the AL kept only four newspapers as its mouthpiece for the party campaign closing publication of all newspapers. This is the basic characteristics of the AL and at that time all eminent editors had to go to jail. For instance Enayetullah Khan, Irfanul Bari, Al Mahmud, Aftab Ahmed – all had to go to jail.

Islam-affiliated parties held large demonstrations on 6 April 2013, with protesters demanding a new blasphemy law with a penalty of death. The Prime Minister said she did not support such legislation.

Noting that blasphemy laws covered "hurting religious sentiment," the government charged four bloggers of eleven it identified as posting anti-Muslim material. It said the law could be applied to Amar Desh and Daily Sangram for inaccurate December 2012 articles purportedly representing imams in Saudi Arabia. In late February 2013, the bloggers and Amar Desh attacked each other in print and online. Reporters Without Borders and the Committee to Protect Journalists have criticised both the legal harassment of Mahmudur Rahman and the arrest of bloggers as hampering freedom of the press in Bangladesh.

=== April 2013 Arrest ===
On 11 April 2013, Bangladesh Police finally arrested Mahmudur Rahman on charges of sedition related to the hacked Nizamul Huq-Ziauddin conversations, other cyber-crimes, and inciting violence. They seized his electronics and storage devices. The court granted 13 days of remand for sedition and the other charges. The confirmed charges are as follows:

- Section 124(a) of the Bangladesh Penal Code for sedition;
- Article 57, Subsections 1 and 2 of the Cyber Crime and Information and Communication Act 2006, for "publishing fake, obscene or defaming information in electronic form", popularly known for aggravating "religious sentiments", which could carry a penalty of 10 years in prison; and
- Article 58 of the Cyber Crime and Information and Communication Act 2006.

That evening, the police closed down the Amar Desh. Although the newspaper had been sealed, its declaration had not been suspended; the Amar Desh was distributed in limited editions for the next three days in Dhaka using another press. Police raided the Daily Sangram and found evidence that it was printing Amar Desh. The government sued Sangram's publisher and editor, Abul Asad, and arrested 19 printers. It also filed charges against Mahmuda Begum, Mahmudur Rahman's mother, who had become the acting head of the newspaper in the absence of the editor. Syed Abdal Ahmed, an attorney and executive editor of the Amar Desh, said the Supreme Court's order from 2010 (?) was still in effect and prohibited the government from stopping the paper's publication. Information Minister Hasanul Haq Inu said Amar Desh could resume printing from another site once it had an order from Dhaka's magistrate.

Farhad Mazhar, a journalist and family friend, had seen marks on Mahmudur Rahman's body that appeared to be signs of torture while in police confinement. Mahmudur Rahman's wife filed a petition asserting the police had tortured Mahmudur Rahman during the seven-day remand period related to sedition charges. The Supreme Court indicated it would respond to the writ on 21 April 2013. During his detention, Rahman started a hunger strike on 15 April to demand continued publication of the paper and the dropping of charges against his mother and the 19 printers. In total, Mahmudur Rahman spent 13 days on remand.

On 12 June, Mahmudur Rahman was remanded again for a further 3 days for the disturbances at 22 February protests that were alleged to be stirred up by Amar Desh reports.

On 3 December, a court placed Mahmudur Rahman on a further six-day remand followed by confinement in jail.

==== Reactions to arrest ====
International human rights groups criticised the government's actions and called for the release of Mahmudur Rahman and the four bloggers. Protesting were Human Rights Watch, the International Federation of Human Rights (FIDH) and the World Organization Against Torture (OMCT), which also asked the government to guarantee Mahmudur Rahman's security from torture; and the Asian Human Rights Commission. In addition, press organisations supported release of the publisher and bloggers, and urged the government to protect freedom of the press. They included International Federation of Journalists and the Committee to Protect Journalists.

Bangladesh politicians and activists generally responded in terms of their affiliations. Concerns expressed included that the government was increasing tensions, and opposition leaders urged freedom of the press. Representatives of the Awami League and those who opposed Mahmudur Rahman repeated accusations against him. Nurul Kabir, editor of the competing daily, New Age, said, "I have serious disagreement with the editorial policy of Mahmudur Rahman and the most of the contents that his paper Amar Desh disseminates, but I have no doubt that the government has arrested him primarily because of his active support for the opposition political camps. In a democratic dispensation, this is unacceptable."

After a Dhaka court accepted charges against 41 opposition politicians related to protests, BNP committee member MK Anwar spoke before a rally at the National Press Club. He said, "There's no peace in people's minds. Opposition leaders and workers are subjected to extreme torture. Now they (the Awami League government) have launched coercive acts against mass media. This government can't tolerate its opponents' views. They've closed down 'Amar Desh' printing press after arresting its acting editor Mahmudur Rahman." On the other hand, a leader of the Shahbag protests repeated accusations of Mahmudur Rahman's misinformation.

After more than a month of confinement, 15 editors signed a joint statement that demanded the release of Mahmudur Rahman, dismissal of cases against Mahmudur Rahman's mother and Daily Sangram for printing Amar Desh after Mahmudur Rahman's arrest, and an end to the ban on Amar Desh's publication, as well as similar bans from 5 May on broadcasters Diganta and Islamic TV.

Rahman published, in 2019, The Political History of Muslim Bengal, which he had written in ten months in prison. Mohammad Hossain, in a review for Insight Turkey, said, "it vividly captures the tensions and intricacies of emerging notions of Bangladeshi Muslim identity".

== Personal life ==
He married Firoza Khan, the daughter of Harunur Rashid Khan Monno.

== Bibliography ==
Mahmudur Rahman has written several books in Bengali and English.

- রহমান, মাহমুদুর (2025). হাসিনার ফ্যাসিবাদ (in Bengali) (1st ed.). মহানগর পাবলিকেশন. ISBN 978-984-29066-0-2.
- রহমান, মাহমুদুর (2025). গুমের জননী (in Bengali) (1st ed.). সৃজনী. ISBN 9789849619062.
- Rahman, Mahmudur. Selected Editorial (1st ed.). সৃজনী. ISBN 9789849619055.
- রহমান, মাহমুদুর (2024). দুর্নীতিমুক্ত দেশ : সমাজ চিন্তকদের ভাবনা (in Bengali). সৃজনী. ASIN B0CVX4S2FT.
- রহমান, মাহমুদুর (2024). জয় আসলে ভারতের (in Bengali) (5th ed.). ইতি প্রকাশন. ISBN 9789848974520.
- রহমান, মাহমুদুর (2020). কার মান কখন যায় (in Bengali) (4th ed.). ইতি প্রকাশন. ISBN 9789848974414.
- Rahman, Mahmudur (2019). The Political History of Muslim Bengal: An Unfinished Battle of Faith. Newcastle upon Tyne: Cambridge Scholars Publishing. ISBN 978-1-5275-1935-0.
- রহমান, মাহমুদুর (2015). নবরূপে বাকশাল (in Bengali) (5th ed.). হাসি প্রকাশনী. ISBN 978-9848661642.
- রহমান, মাহমুদুর (2014). মুসলমানের মানবাধিকার থাকতে নেই (in Bengali) (2nd ed.). কাশবন প্রকাশন. ISBN 9789848907566.
- রহমান, মাহমুদুর (2014). ১/১১ থেকে ডিজিটাল (in Bengali) (4th ed.). হাসি প্রকাশনী. ISBN 978-9848661659.
- রহমান, মাহমুদুর (2012). ফুলবাড়ীর রাজনীতি (in Bengali) (3rd ed.). কাশবন প্রকাশন. ISBN 9789848907382.
- রহমান, মাহমুদুর (2012). জেল থেকে জেলে (in Bengali) (3rd ed.). অনন্যা. ISBN 9789849001881.
- রহমান, মাহমুদুর. গুমরাজ্যে প্রত্যাবর্তন (in Bengali). কাশবন প্রকাশন.

== Awards ==
- Ekushey Padak (2025)

== See also ==
- Mass media in Bangladesh
- Censorship in Bangladesh
- Freedom of the press in Bangladesh
- Committee to Protect Journalists
- Reporters Without Borders
- 2012 ICT Skype controversy
