= Abdur Rauf Khan =

Bangladeshi politician (1939–2021)

- আবদুর রউফ খান

Member of Parliament for Manikganj-2
- In office 3 March 1988 – 6 December 1990
- Preceded by: Lutfar Rahman Biswas
- Succeeded by: Harunur Rashid Khan Monno

Personal details
- Born: 27 January 1939 Manikganj
- Died: 2 May 2021 (aged 82) Bashundhara
- Party: Jatiya Party

Abdur Rauf Khan (27 January 1939 – 2 May 2021) was a Manikganj district politician and freedom fighter of Bangladesh who was a member of parliament for the Manikganj-2 constituency.

== Early and family life ==
Abdur Rauf Khan was born on 27 January 1939 in Ghonapara village of Arua union in Shivalaya Upazila of Manikganj District. His father Abdul Majid Khan was the chairman of Arua Union Parishad, and his mother's name is Mahmuda Begum. His younger brother Rezaur Rahman Khan Janu is the chairman of Shibalaya Upazila Parishad and a freedom fighter. Another younger brother, Sultan Khan, was chairman of the Arua Union Parishad.

His wife, the late Monowara Sultana Khan, was a professor and freedom fighter, and their two sons, Atiyar Rahman Khan and Habibur Rahman Khan.

== Career ==
Abdur Rauf Khan was the deputy regional commander in Sector Two during the War of Liberation. He was elected member of parliament from the Manikganj-2 constituency as a candidate of the Jatiya Party in the 4th Jatiya Sangsad elections of 1988.

He was defeated in the 7th Jatiya Sangsad elections on 12 June 1996 and 8th Jatiya Sangsad elections of 2001 as a candidate of Jatiya Party from the Manikganj-2 constituency.

== Death ==
Abdur Rauf Khan died on 2 May 2021.
