= Ishfaq Ilahi Choudhury =

Bangladesh Air Force officer

- Military career
- Allegiance: Pakistan (before 1973); Bangladesh
- Branch: Pakistan Air Force; Bangladesh Air Force
- Service years: 1964 - 2003
- Rank: Air Commodore
- Unit: No.5 Squadron, GD(N)
- Commands: ACAS (Administration) at Air Headquarters; AOC of BAF Base Paharkanchanpur; FSR of BAF Base Matiur Rahman; Director (Administration) at Air Headquarters
- Conflicts: Indo-Pakistani War of 1965

Ishfaq Ilahi Choudhury is a retired air officer of Bangladesh Air Force and treasurer of East West University. He is the former treasurer of the University of Asia Pacific. He is a former registrar of Brac University. He is a security analyst and columnist.

== Career ==
Chowdhury was commissioned in the Pakistan Air Force and served in a radar station during the 1965 Indo-Pakistan war.

Choudhury retired from Bangladesh Air Force in 2003. He was an instructor of the National Defence College. He wrote a chapter in the 2008 book Countering Terrorism in Bangladesh published by Bangladesh Enterprise Institute.

from 2010 to 2013, Choudhury was the registrar of Brac University.

Choudhury was the acting vice chancellor of the University of Asia Pacific in 2020. He was the treasurer and the Directorate of Students' Welfare of the University of Asia Pacific in 2021.

Choudhury is the treasurer of East West University.

== Political views ==
Choudhury has praised India and Indira Gandhi for their actions during the Bangladesh Liberation War. He had called for reforms in Madrassah education in Bangladesh describing it as a legacy of colonialism. He has written calling for action from moderate Muslims against extremism. He has written about the plight of religious minorities in Bangladesh.
