= Manikganj-3 =

Bangladeshi parliamentary constituency

Coordinates: 23.81°N 90.15°E

- Constituency for the Jatiya Sangsad
- District: Manikganj District
- Division: Dhaka Division
- Electorate: 319,722 (2018)

Current constituency
- Created: 1984
- Party: Bangladesh Nationalist Party
- Member: Afroza Khanam Rita
- ← 169 Manikganj-2 171 Munshiganj-1 →

Manikganj-3 is a constituency represented in the Jatiya Sangsad (National Parliament) of Bangladesh since 2026 by Afroza Khanam Rita of the Bangladesh Nationalist Party.

== Boundaries ==
The constituency encompasses Saturia Upazila and all but the three southernmost union parishads of Manikganj Sadar Upazila: Bhararia, Hati Para, and Putail.

== History ==
The constituency was created in 1984 from the Dhaka-3 constituency when the former Dhaka District was split into six districts: Manikganj, Munshiganj, Dhaka, Gazipur, Narsingdi, and Narayanganj.

Ahead of the 2008 general election, the Election Commission redrew constituency boundaries to reflect population changes revealed by the 2001 Bangladesh census. The 2008 redistricting altered the boundaries of the constituency.

== Members of Parliament ==
Election	Member	Party
1986	Abdul Malek	Jatiya Party
1988	Nizam Uddin Khan	Bangladesh Nationalist Party
1991	Nizam Uddin Khan	Bangladesh Nationalist Party
1996 by-election	Abdul Wahab Khan	Bangladesh Nationalist Party
2001	Harunur Rashid Khan Monno	Bangladesh Nationalist Party
2008	Zahid Maleque	Awami League
2026	Afroza Khanam Rita	Bangladesh Nationalist Party

== Elections ==
=== Elections in the 2020s ===
General Election 2026: Manikganj-3
Party	Candidate	Votes	%	±%
BNP	Afroza Khanam Rita	166,175		
BKM	Md Sayid Nur	62,916		
Independent	Ataur Rahman Ata	20,375		
Independent	Rafikul Islam Khan	3,552		
JSD	Shahjahan Ali Shazu	3,491		
IAB	Shamsuddin Ahmed	2,768		
JP(E)	Abul Bashar Badshah	1,942		
Independent	Moazzem Hossain Khan	1,321		
BNP gain from AL				

=== Elections in the 2010s ===
Zahid Maleque was re-elected unopposed in the 2014 general election after opposition parties withdrew their candidacies in a boycott of the election.

=== Elections in the 2000s ===
General Election 2008: Manikganj-3
Party	Candidate	Votes	%	±%
AL	Zahid Maleque	130,111	57.9	+19.8
BNP	Harunur Rashid Khan Monno	92,216	41.0	−15.4
IAB	Sohrab Hossen	941	0.4	N/A
Gano Forum	Mofizul Islam Khan Kamal	854	0.4	0.0
BTF	Md. Habibur Rahman	405	0.2	N/A
JSD	Iqbal Hossain Khan	291	0.1	−1.1
Majority		37,895	16.9	−1.5
Turnout		224,818	88.7	+9.0
AL gain from BNP				

General Election 2001: Manikganj-3
Party	Candidate	Votes	%	±%
BNP	Harunur Rashid Khan Monno	105,474	56.4	
AL	Zahid Maleque	71,139	38.1	
IJOF	Helal Uddin Ahmed	7,078	3.8	
JSD	Iqbal Hossain Khan	2,188	1.2	
Gano Forum	Rofiqa Halim Chowdhury	822	0.4	
Jatiya Party (M)	Abul Khayer Siddiqi	170	0.1	
Majority		34,335	18.4	
Turnout		186,871	79.7	
BNP hold				

=== Elections in the 1990s ===
Nizam Uddin Khan died in office. Abdul Wahab Khan of the BNP was elected in a 1996 by-election.

General Election June 1996: Manikganj-3
Party	Candidate	Votes	%	±%
BNP	Nizam Uddin Khan	64,715	44.6	−6.1
JP(E)	Abdul Malek	41,532	28.6	+19.3
AL	Jalal Uddin Ahmed	30,126	20.8	−2.3
JSD	Iqbal Hossain Khan	3,225	2.2	−2.9
Jamaat	Md. Anwar Hossain	1,945	1.3	−1.9
Gano Forum	Mofizul Islam Khan Kamal	1,882	1.3	N/A
IOJ	Md. Abu Taher	1,203	0.8	N/A
Zaker Party	Gazi Mamunur Rahman	530	0.4	−1.4
Majority		23,183	16.0	−11.7
Turnout		145,158	81.1	+17.5
BNP hold				

General Election 1991: Manikganj-3
Party	Candidate	Votes	%	±%
BNP	Nizam Uddin Khan	63,963	50.7	
AL	Mofizul Islam Khan Kamal	29,068	23.1	
JP(E)	Nurul Aamin Khan	11,771	9.3	
CPB	Azaharul Islam Aarzu	6,797	5.4	
JSD	Iqbal Hossain Khan	6,409	5.1	
Jamaat	Delwar Hossain	4,062	3.2	
Zaker Party	Golam Rabbani	2,328	1.8	
BKA	Hafizul Islam Nannu Miah	1,008	0.8	
Independent	Moazzem Hossain Khan Mojlish	330	0.3	
Independent	Syed Sarwar Alam Chowdhury	309	0.2	
Majority		34,895	27.7	
Turnout		126,045	63.6	
BNP gain from JP(E)				
