= Abdul Malek (officer) =

Bangladeshi politician

Mohammad Abdul Malek

Member of the Bangladesh Parliament for Manikganj-3
- In office 20 October 1986 – 9 November 1989
- President: Hussain Muhammad Ershad
- Preceded by: Position created
- Succeeded by: Nizam Uddin Khan

Personal details
- Born: 29 August 1935 Manikganj, Bengal, British India
- Died: 18 July 2000 (aged 64) Dhaka, Bangladesh
- Party: Jatiya Party (Ershad)
- Children: Zahid Maleque

Military service
- Allegiance: Pakistan (before 1972); Bangladesh
- Branch/service: Pakistan Army; Bangladesh Army
- Years of service: 1959 - 1976
- Rank: Colonel
- Unit: Ordnance Corps
- Commands: Commandant of Ordnance Centre and School; Station Commander, Jessore Cantonment

Abdul Malek (1935–2000) was a Jatiya Party (Ershad) politician and a member of parliament for Manikganj-3. He was a colonel of the Bangladesh Army and a mayor of Dhaka.

== Early life and education ==
Malek was born on 29 August 1935 in Manikganj, Bengal Presidency, British India (present day Bangladesh). He completed his matriculation from Manikganj Model High School in 1952. He passed his intermediate from Government Debendra College. He completed his bachelor's degree at Dhaka University. He joined the Pakistan Army in 1958.

== Career ==
Colonel Malek joined the Pakistan Army in 1958. He was from the 7th Officers Training School Course of officers training course Kohat. He was commissioned on 24 January 1959. Later he served in the Bangladesh Army and retired from the army in 1976.

Abdul Malek was elected to parliament from Manikganj-3 as a Jatiya Party candidate in 1986 and 1988. From 20 October 1986 to 9 November 1989, he served as the mayor/administrator of Dhaka City Corporation. He was appointed to the position by President Hussain Mohammad Ershad.

== Personal life ==
Abdul Malek's son Zahid Maleque was the minister for health and family planning until 2023.

== Legacy ==
Colonel Malek Medical College was named after him.
