= Dewan Zahid Ahmed Tulu =

Bangladesh politician

Dewan Zahid Ahmed
- দেওয়ান জাহিদ আহমেদ

Member of Parliament
- In office 29 January 2024 – 6 August 2024
- Preceded by: Momtaz Begum
- Succeeded by: Vacant
- Constituency: Manikganj-2

Personal details
- Born: 15 December 1968 (age 57)
- Party: Awami League
- Occupation: Politician

Dewan Zahid Ahmed Tulu (born 15 December 1968) is a Bangladeshi politician and industrialist. He is a former Jatiya Sangsad member representing the Manikganj-2 constituency.

== Career ==
Zahid was the Manikganj District Awami League treasurer. He was elected to parliament from Manikganj-2 as an independent candidate on 7 January 2024. The Awami League candidate, Momtaz Begum, alleged the election was rigged in favor of Zahid.
