= Monno Ceramics =

Monno Ceramic Industries Ltd.
- Company type: Public Limited
- Industry: Ceramic Tableware Manufacturing
- Founded: 1984
- Founder: Harunur Rashid Khan Monno
- Headquarters: Dhaka, Bangladesh
- Area served: North America, Europe, Asia, Australasia and Africa
- Key people: Afroza Khan Rita (Chairman)
- Products: Porcelain, New Bone China, Ivory China and Bone China tableware
- Parent: Monno Group of Industries
- Website: www.monno.com

Monno Ceramic is a ceramic tableware manufacturing companies in Bangladesh. Based in Dhaka, the company was established in 1984 by the late Harunur Rashid Khan Monno.
