= Lutfar Rahman Biswas =

Bangladeshi politician

Member of Bangladesh Parliament
- In office 1986–1988
- Succeeded by: Abdur Rauf Khan

Personal details
- Party: Jatiya Party (Ershad)

Lutfar Rahman Biswas is a Jatiya Party (Ershad) politician and a former member of parliament for Manikganj-2.

== Career ==
Biswas was elected to parliament from Manikganj-2 as a Jatiya Party candidate in 1986.
