= Momtaz Begum =

Bangladeshi singer and politician

- মমতাজ বেগম
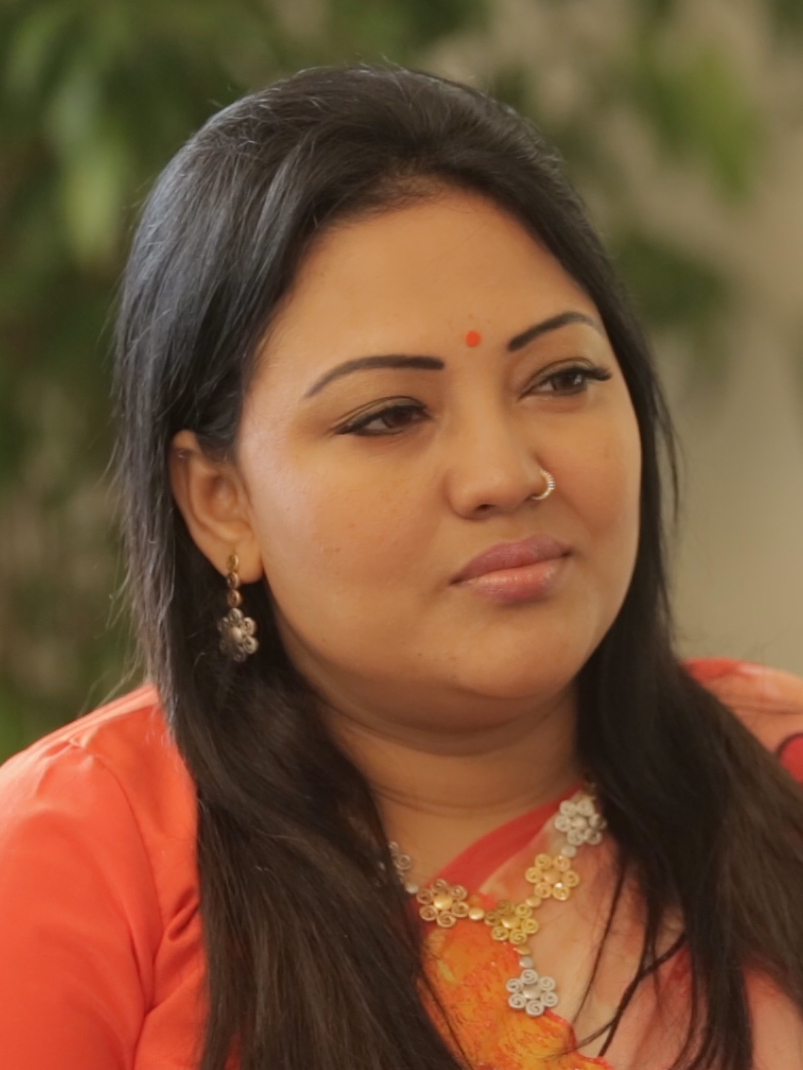
- Begum in 2017

Member of Parliament
- In office 29 January 2014 – 29 January 2024
- Preceded by: S. M. Abdul Mannan
- Succeeded by: Dewan Zahid Ahmed Tulu
- Constituency: Manikganj-2
- In office 29 January 2009 – 29 January 2014
- Constituency: Women's Reserved Seat

Personal details
- Born: 5 May 1961 (age 65) Singair, East Pakistan, Pakistan
- Party: Bangladesh Awami League
- Occupation: Singer, politician

Momtaz Begum (Bengali: মমতাজ বেগম; born 5 May 1961) is a Bangladeshi folk singer and politician. She served as the member of parliament representing the Manikganj-2 constituency from 2014 to 2024 and Reserved Women's Seat-21 from 2009 to 2013.

Referred to as "The Music Queen", she has recorded around 700 albums. Some of her notable works include Return Ticket, Ashol Boithoki, Murshider Talim, and Ronger Bazar.

Begum won the Bangladesh National Film Award for Best Female Playback Singer three times for the films Nekabborer Mohaproyan (2014), Swatta (2017), and Maya: The Lost Mother (2019). In 2021, she earned a controversial honorary doctorate degree from Global Human Peace University in Tamil Nadu, India.

== Early life ==
Begum was born on 5 May 1961 in the village of Joymontop in Singair, in Manikganj, to Uzala Begum and Modhu Boyati, a baul singer. She spent most of her childhood learning music from her father. She also took lessons from Razzak Dewan and Abdur Rashid Sorkar.

Begum's initiation into music occurred early. She was a child when she accompanied her father, first as an audience member, and soon after as a co-performer. The kind of music she performed, like Marfati, Boithoki, and Murshidi, can roughly be categorized in the mystic songs genre.

== Career ==
Initially, Begum released albums entirely financed by herself. After these became popular, she was hired by producers to make further recordings, though her payment was usually a very low flat fee, and the contract stipulated that this would have to be paid back if these did not sell well. However, her musical works tended to sell out almost immediately, and within a very short period, she found herself quite busy, often recording two songs per day. In an interview with the Bangladeshi daily Daily Star, she stated, "I used to be handed down the lyrics and the music tracks minutes before and there used to be hardly any time for rehearsal and I had to record it at all in one go".

In 2021, Begum received an honorary doctorate degree from Global Human Peace University, which is said to be located in Tamil Nadu, India. But as per reports, the university did not have accreditation from India's University Grants Commission. According to The UGC Act-1956, unaccredited universities cannot confer or grant any degree. Indian law enforcement authorities have raided similar unaccredited universities several times while distributing fake honorary doctorate degrees for money. Momtaz Begum's degree achievement sparked criticism in the country. However, she denied the allegation and said the university did not seem 'fake' to her.

In India, four arrest warrants have been issued against Begum at different times regarding contract breach and cheating allegations. In December 2008, she received Rs. 1.4 million to appear at an event in Murshidabad but did not attend. This led to a case filed against her in the Chief Judicial Magistrate Court of Murshidabad, later reaching the Calcutta High Court. The latest arrest warrant against her was issued on 9 August 2023.

Begum was elected as a member of parliament from Manikganj-2 in 2008, 2014, and 2018. But she lost the national assembly election in 2024 from the same constituency to Dewan Zahid Ahemd Tulu, an independent candidate. Begum established a 50-bed "Momtaz Eye Hospital" with support from Orbis International, in her native village, Joymontop. The hospital was established in memory of her father, Modhu Boyati, who lost his eyesight as he could not afford a cataract operation due to poverty.

On 12 May 2025, she was arrested by the Detective Branch of Bangladesh Police in Dhanmondi. She has been named in several cases filed over the deaths during the July Revolution which overthrew the Sheikh Hasina led Awami League government. Her bank accounts were frozen on the orders of the Bangladesh Financial Intelligence Unit. Supporters of the Bangladesh Nationalist Party harassed and assaulted her in the Manikganj District Court. In June 2026, the High Court granted her bail in three cases related to the July Uprising. However, she remained in custody as she faced several other criminal cases filed following the fall of the Awami League government. Her properties were seized following an order issued by Dhaka Metropolitan Senior Special Judge Sabbir Faiz following a petition by the Anti-Corruption Commission.

== Personal life ==
Begum resides in Mohakhali DOHS, Dhaka.
