= Zahid Maleque =

Bangladeshi politician

- জাহিদ মালেক
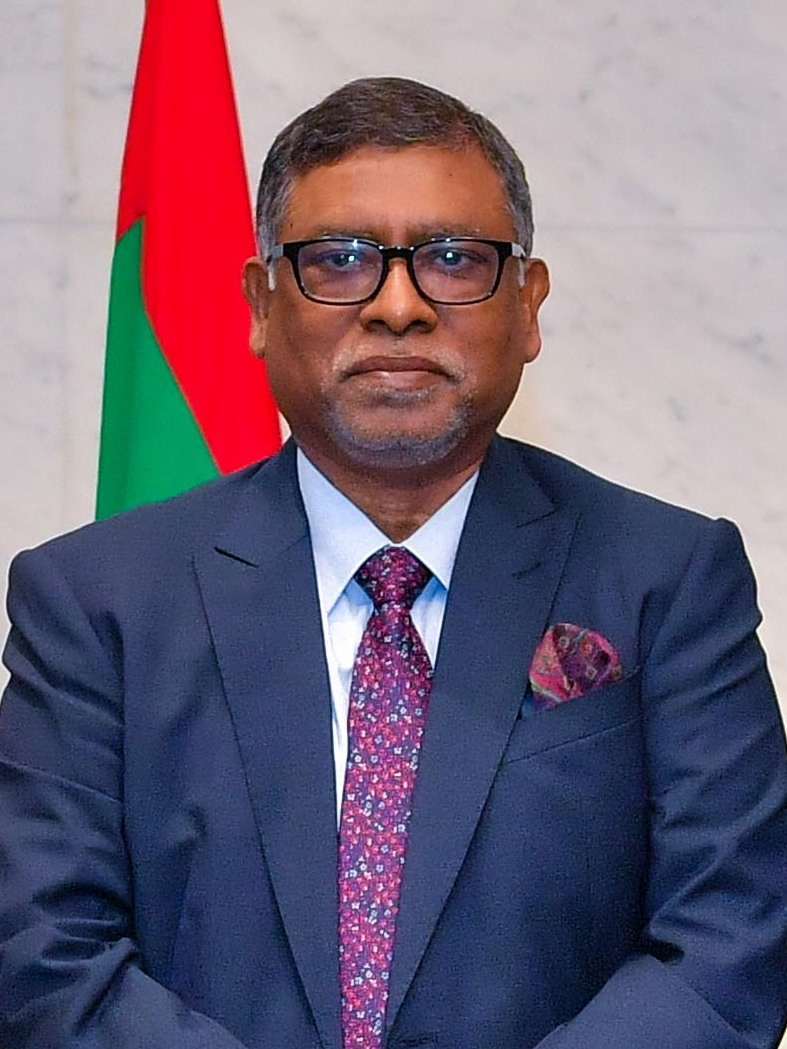
- Maleque in 2021

Minister of Health and Family Welfare
- In office 7 January 2019 – 10 January 2024
- Prime Minister: Sheikh Hasina
- Preceded by: Mohammed Nasim
- Succeeded by: Samanta Lal Sen

Member of the Bangladesh Parliament for Manikganj-3
- In office 25 January 2009 – 6 August 2024
- Preceded by: Harunur Rashid Khan Monno
- Succeeded by: Afroza Khanam Rita

Personal details
- Born: 11 April 1959 (age 67) Manikganj, East Pakistan, Pakistan
- Party: Bangladesh Awami League
- Parents: Abdul Maleque (father); Fouzia Maleque (mother)
- Education: University of Dhaka

Zahid Maleque (born 11 April 1959) is a Bangladesh Awami League politician and a former minister of health and family welfare. He is a former Jatiya Sangsad member representing the Manikganj-3 constituency during 2009–2024.

In 2016, Maleque received WHO award on behalf of the health ministry for reducing child mortality. He has faced criticism over his handling of the COVID-19 pandemic in Bangladesh.

== Early life ==
Maleque was born on 11 April 1959 in Garpara Union, Manikganj Sadar Upazila, Manikgonj District in the then East Pakistan. He completed his undergrad and postgrad in English from the University of Dhaka. His parents were Colonel M. A. Maleque and Fouzia Maleque. His father was a former minister, a former mayor of Dhaka, and member of parliament.

== Career ==
Maleque is the chairman of Sun Life Insurance Company Limited, Bangladesh Thai Aluminium Limited, World Wide Enterprise Limited, Rahat Real Estate and Construction Limited and Pristine Color Limited.

Maleque contested the general election in 2001 from Manikganj-3 as a candidate of the Awami League and lost to Harunur Rashid Khan Monno of the Bangladesh Nationalist Party.

Maleque contested the general election in 2008 from Manikganj-3 as a candidate of the Awami League and won, defeating Harunur Rashid Khan Monno of the Bangladesh Nationalist Party.

Maleque was re-elected unopposed from Manikganj-3 in the 2014 general election as a candidate of the Awami League. The election was boycotted by all other major political parties.

Maleque was re-elected from Manikganj-3 in the 2018 general election as a candidate of the Awami League. His opponent, Afroza Khan Rita, from the Bangladesh Nationalist Party was barred from standing by the Bangladesh Supreme Court after Sonali Bank Limited claimed she defaulted on an 18 billion taka loan from the bank. Afroza Khan Rita is the daughter of Harunur Rashid Khan Monno. He received 220 thousand votes while his nearest rival, Mifizul Islam Khan Kamal from Gono Forum, received 29 thousand votes.

On 23 March 2020, Maleque reported that the government had enough protective gear and testing kits for the COVID-19 pandemic in Bangladesh.

Maleque was criticised in a session at the parliament of Bangladesh on 30 June 2020. Member of Parliament Pir Fazlur Rahman called for his removal and replacement by Matia Chowdhury. Mujibul Haque Chunnu, member of parliament, criticised his handling of the COVID-19 pandemic in Bangladesh. He said that health workers in his constituency got infected with COVID-19 after receiving poor quality protective equipment. Members of parliament Rowshan Ara Mannan and Harunur Rashid also criticised him in the parliamentary session. On 14 July 2020, he denied there were any tensions between the Ministry of Health and Family Welfare and the Directorate General of Health Services.

On 12 December 2020, Maleque reported that the government has spent 400 thousand taka per patient of COVID-19. He issued a statement on 30 December 2020 that the COVID-19 situation in Bangladesh was under control.

On 9 March 2021, Maleque said that the pandemic exposed the weakness of the healthcare system in Bangladesh. He also claimed that the government of Bangladesh reacted quickly to the pandemic.
