= Simulia Union =

Simulia Union শিমুলিয়া ইউনিয়ন
- Union
- Location within Bangladesh
- Coordinates: 23.815448°N 89.874210°E
- Country: Bangladesh
- Division: Dhaka
- District: Manikganj
- Upazila: Shivalaya
- Established: 1918

Government
  - chairman: Jahir uddin Manik

Area
  - Total: 20.72 km^{2} (8.00 sq mi)

Population (2011)
  - Total: 30,220
  - Density: 1,458/km^{2} (3,777/sq mi)
- Time zone: UTC+6 (BST)
- Website: shimuliaup.manikganj.gov.bd

Simulia (Bengali: শিমুলিয়া)is a union of Shivalaya Upazila under Manikganj District in Dhaka Division, Bangladesh.

== History ==
Simulia Union was established in 1918.

== Education ==
- Bajpara High School
- Dhakaijora hazi korban ali memorial institute
- Shakrail high school
- Jomunabad high school
