= Uthali Union, Shivalaya =

Uthali Union উথলী ইউনিয়ন
- Union
- Location within Bangladesh
- Coordinates: 23.846791°N 89.820632°E
- Country: Bangladesh
- Division: Dhaka
- District: Manikganj
- Upazila: Shivalaya
- Established: 1918

Area
  - Total: 23.37 km^{2} (9.02 sq mi)

Population (2011)
  - Total: 24,702
  - Density: 1,057/km^{2} (2,738/sq mi)
- Time zone: UTC+6 (BST)
- Website: utholiup.manikganj.gov.bd

Uthali Union (Bengali: উথলী ইউনিয়ন) is a union parishad under Shivalaya Upazila of Manikganj District in central Bangladesh.

== History ==
Uthali Union was established in 1918.

== Demographics ==
According to the 2011 Bangladesh census, Uthali Union had 5,712 households and a population of 24,702. Islam was the majority religion (83.8% of the population). Hindus were the second-largest religious community (15.3% of the population). 9.4% of the population was under the age of 5. The literacy rate (age 7 and over) was 66.7%, compared to the national average of 51.8%.

== Education ==
There is one secondary school, Utali Pilot Girls High School.
