= Abdul Wahab Khan (judge) =

Bangladeshi politician

- আবদুল ওহাব খান

Member of the Bangladesh Parliament for Manikganj-3
- In office 15 June 1996 – 13 July 2001
- Preceded by: Nizam Uddin Khan
- Succeeded by: Harunur Rashid Khan Monno

Personal details
- Born: 11 December 1924 Manikganj, Bengal, British India
- Died: 1 September 2013 (aged 89) Manikganj, Dhaka, Bangladesh

Abdul Wahab Khan (c. 1924–1 September 2013) was a Bangladeshi judge and a Jatiya Sangsad member representing the Manikganj-3 constituency during 1996–2001.

== Career ==
Khan wrote novels, including Kolkata Theke Dhaka and Jakhan Ami Munsef Chhilam.
