= Monno Medical College =

Private medical school in Manikganj, Bangladesh

Monno Medical College and Hospital
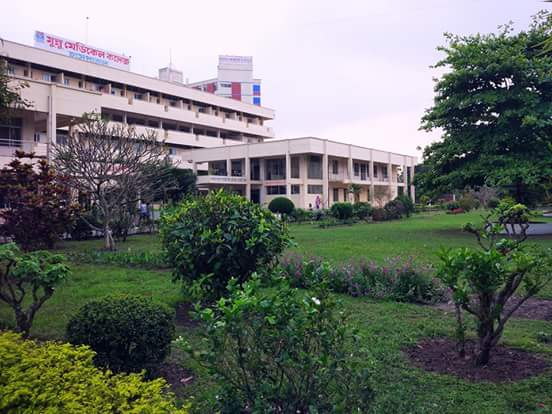
- Monno Medical College and Hospital
- Type: Private medical school
- Established: 2011
- Academic affiliations: University of Dhaka
- Chairman: Afroza Khanam
- Principal: Md. Abdul Karim
- Director: Brig Gen Zulfiquer Ahmed Amin (Retd) (Hospital Section)
- Students: 496
- Location: Monno City, Gilondo, Manikganj District, Bangladesh; 23.8479°N 89.9533°E
- Campus: Rural
- Language: English
- Website: monnomch.edu.bd

Monno Medical College and Hospital (MoMC&H) is a non-profit private medical school in Bangladesh, established in 2011. It is affiliated with the University of Dhaka.

It has a five-year course plan leading to a Bachelor of Medicine, Bachelor of Surgery (MBBS) degree. The degree is recognised by the Bangladesh Medical and Dental Council (BM&DC) and Ministry of Health, Bangladesh.

== History ==
Harunur Rashid Khan Monno established Monno Medical College in 2011.

== Campus ==
The college is located in Monno City, Gilondo, Ghior Upazila, 7 kilometres (4.3 mi) west of Manikganj, on the south side of the Dhaka–Aricha Highway. The main buildings on the campus include ten-storied academic buildings, separate hostels for male and female students as well as for male interns and female interns, a dormitory for doctors and professors, and Monno Medical College Hospital, the college's five-story, 500-bed teaching hospital.

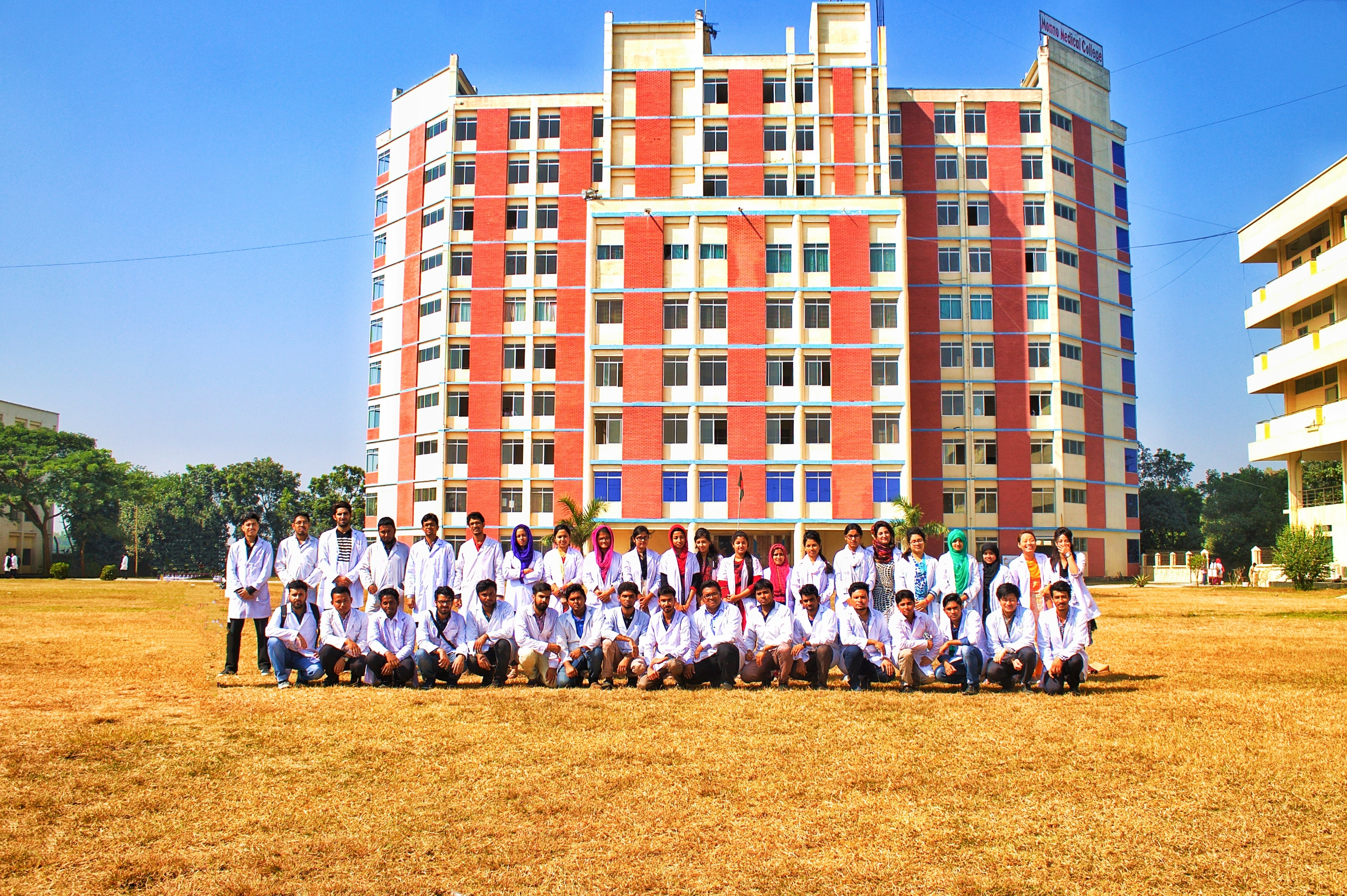
Front view of Monno Medical College with students of Dynamic Monno-04 Batch

== Organization and administration ==
The college is affiliated with Dhaka University as a constituent college. The chairman of the college is Afroza Khanam. The principal is Md. Abdul Karim.

== Academics ==
The college offers a five-year course of study, approved by the Bangladesh Medical and Dental Council (BMDC), leading to a Bachelor of Medicine, Bachelor of Surgery (MBBS) degree from Dhaka University. After passing the final professional examination, there is a compulsory one-year internship. The internship is a prerequisite for obtaining registration from the BMDC to practice medicine.

Night view of Monno Medical College campus in front of mosque.

== Journal ==
Monno Medical College publishes a Journal entitled "Journal of Monno Medical College," which is a peer-reviewed biennial medical journal with different scientific research articles by the faculties of this medical college as well as the researchers of the different hospitals and Institutions.

== Admission ==
Admission for Bangladeshis to the MBBS programmes at all medical colleges in Bangladesh, government and private, is conducted centrally by the Directorate General of Health Services (DGHS). It administers a written multiple choice question exam throughout the country. Candidates are admitted based primarily on their score on this test, although grades at Secondary School Certificate (SSC) and Higher Secondary School Certificate (HSC) levels could affect the score.

As of December 2017, the college is allowed to admit 80 students annually, permitting 50% of seats for foreigners.
