= Mafizul Islam Khan Kamal =

Bangladeshi politician

Member of Bangladesh Parliament
- In office 1973–1979
- Succeeded by: Nizam Uddin Khan

Personal details
- Born: Manikganj
- Political party: Gano Forum

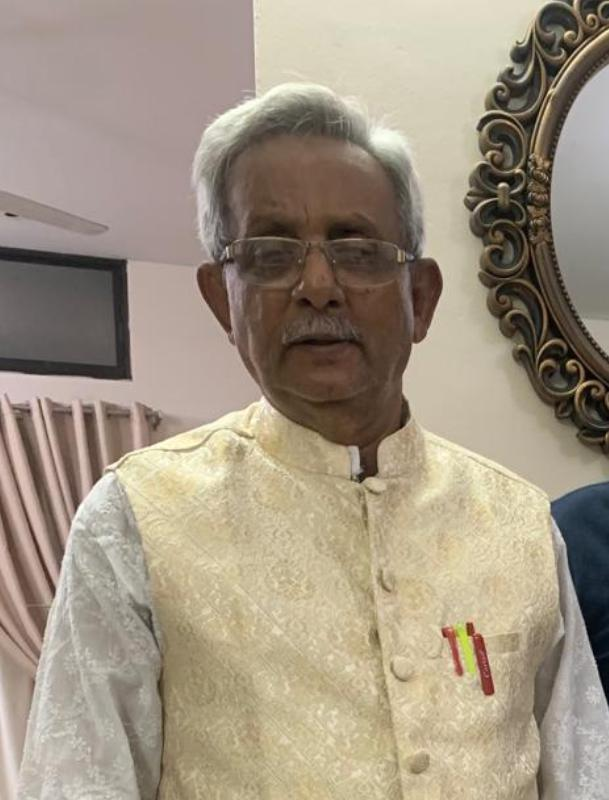
Mafizul Islam Khan Kamal

Mafizul Islam Khan Kamal is a freedom fighter and politician. He is a former member of parliament for the then Dhaka-3 (Manikganj-3) constituency.

He fought as a freedom fighter during the liberation war in 1971. In 1973, he was elected as one of youngest MPs in independent Bangladesh's first parliament.

He was one of the founding leaders of Gano Forum in 1993 and served as its executive president. In October 2023, he became president of a Gano Forum splinter fraction.

He is involved in a number social causes and is the founder of a number of educational institutions including Manikganj Mohila College.

He is the son-in-law of former minister and freedom fighter Capt Abdul Haleem Chowdhury.
