= Manikganj-2 =

Constituency of Bangladesh's Jatiya Sangsad

Coordinates: 23.81°N 90.15°E

- Constituency for the Jatiya Sangsad
- District: Manikganj District
- Division: Dhaka Division
- Electorate: 406,245 (2018)

Current constituency
- Created: 1984
- Member: Dewan Zahid Ahmed Tulu
- ← 168 Manikganj-1 170 Manikganj-3 →

Manikganj-2 is a constituency represented in the Jatiya Sangsad (National Parliament) of Bangladesh since 2026 by Moinul Islam Khan of the Bangladesh Nationalist Party.

== Boundaries ==
The constituency encompasses Harirampur and Singair upazilas, and three union parishads of Manikganj Sadar Upazila: Bhararia, Hati Para, and Putail.

== History ==
The constituency was created in 1984 from a Dhaka constituency when the former Dhaka District was split into six districts: Manikganj, Munshiganj, Dhaka, Gazipur, Narsingdi, and Narayanganj.

Ahead of the 2008 general election, the Election Commission redrew constituency boundaries to reflect population changes revealed by the 2001 Bangladesh census. The 2008 redistricting altered the boundaries of the constituency.

== Members of Parliament ==
Election	Member	Party
1986	Lutfar Rahman Biswas	Jatiya Party
1988	Abdur Rauf Khan	Independent
1991	Harunur Rashid Khan Monno	Bangladesh Nationalist Party
1996	Harunur Rashid Khan Monno	Bangladesh Nationalist Party
2001	Harunur Rashid Khan Monno	Bangladesh Nationalist Party
Nov 2001 by-election	Samsuddin Ahmed	Independent
2008	S. M. Abdul Mannan	Jatiya Party (Ershad)
2014	Momtaz Begum	Awami League
2024	Dewan Zahid Ahmed Tulu	Independent
2026	Moinul Islam Khan	Bangladesh Nationalist Party

== Elections ==
=== Elections in the 2010s ===
Momtaz Begum was elected unopposed in the 2014 general election after opposition parties withdrew their candidacies in a boycott of the election.

=== Elections in the 2000s ===
General Election 2008: Manikganj-2
Party	Candidate	Votes	%	±%
JP(E)	S. M. Abdul Mannan	148,276	53.8	N/A
BNP	Afroja Khan Rita	126,423	45.8	+29.0
CPB	Md. Noab Ali	1,145	0.4	N/A
Majority		21,853	7.9	−5.8
Turnout		275,844	87.7	+39.1
JP(E) gain from Independent				

Harunur Rashid Khan Monno stood for two seats in the 2001 general election: Manikganj-2 and Manikganj-3. After winning both, he chose to represent Manikganj-3 and quit Manikganj-2, triggering a by-election in Manikganj-2. Independent candidate Samsuddin Ahmed was elected in a November 2001 by-election.

Manikganj-2 by-election, November 2001
Party	Candidate	Votes	%	±%
Independent	Samsuddin Ahmed	52,171	47.2	N/A
Independent	Abdur Rouf Khan	37,045	33.5	N/A
BNP	Jamilur Rashid Khan	18,566	16.8	−40.9
Independent	A. Quader Biswas	2,016	1.8	N/A
Independent	Md. Maniruzzaman	665	0.6	N/A
BKSMA (Sadeq)	Krishak Md. Sadeq	125	0.1	N/A
Majority		15,126	13.7	−12.5
Turnout		110,588	48.6	−28.1
Independent gain from BNP				

General Election 2001: Manikganj-2
Party	Candidate	Votes	%	±%
BNP	Harunur Rashid Khan Monno	90,160	57.7	+7.6
AL	Golam Mohiuddin	49,202	31.5	+9.8
IJOF	Abdur Rouf Khan	16,203	10.4	N/A
JSD	K. M. Obaydul Islam	325	0.2	N/A
Jatiya Party (M)	K. M. Majibur Rahman Mojnu	272	0.2	N/A
Ganatantri Party	Md. Bellal Hossain	159	0.1	N/A
Majority		40,958	26.2	−2.2
Turnout		156,321	76.7	−3.8
BNP hold				

=== Elections in the 1990s ===
General Election June 1996: Manikganj-2
Party	Candidate	Votes	%	±%
BNP	Harunur Rashid Khan Monno	64,085	50.1	+1.1
AL	A. K. M. Nurul Islam	27,750	21.7	−2.6
JP(E)	Abdur Rouf Khan	26,807	21.0	+7.0
Zaker Party	Md. A. Rahim Khan	7,319	5.7	N/A
Jamaat	Md. Safi Ullah	1,621	1.3	+0.1
CPB	A. Mannan	262	0.2	N/A
Jana Dal	Md. Afzal Hossaib Chowdhury	71	0.1	N/A
Bangladesh Janata Party	Md. Golam Mostofa Khan Raton	68	0.1	N/A
Majority		36,335	28.4	+3.7
Turnout		127,983	80.5	+12.9
BNP hold				

General Election 1991: Manikganj-2
Party	Candidate	Votes	%	±%
BNP	Harunur Rashid Khan Monno	59,280	49.0	
AL	Golam Mohiuddin	29,342	24.3	
JP(E)	Rezaur Rahman	16,956	14.0	
Oikkya Prakriyya	Ali Ahmed Zia Uddin	8,507	7.0	
Zaker Party	Rafiqul Islam	4,678	3.9	
Jamaat	Rais Uddin	1,445	1.2	
Independent	Zahir Uddin Miah	441	0.4	
BKA	Mohammad Ali Miah	327	0.3	
Majority		29,938	24.7	
Turnout		120,976	67.6	
BNP gain from JP(E)				
