= Khandkar Manwar Hossain =

Bangladeshi statistician

- খোন্দকার মনোয়ার হোসেন
- Hossain
- Born: 30 April 1930; Manikganj, Bengal Presidency, British India
- Died: 27 June 1999 (aged 69)
- Education: Presidency College; Calcutta University; University of Dhaka
- Occupations: Statistician, educator, researcher
- Employer: Rajshahi University
- Spouse: Hosneara Begum Jharna
- Parents: Moulavi Khandkar Abdul Hamid (father); Mosammat Akhtara Khatun (mother)
- Relatives: Khandaker Delwar Hossain

Khandkar Manwar Hossain (30 April 1930 – 27 June 1999) was a Bangladeshi statistician. In 1950, he was among the students graduating from the first statistics course at the University of Dhaka. He was the founder of the Department of Statistics of Rajshahi University.

== Personal life ==
Hossain was born in 1930 at the police station of Pachuria village, Mahadevpur, Manikganj, British India, (now Bangladesh). His parents were Moulavi Khandkar Abdul Hamid and Mosammat Akhtara Khatun. Hossain's brother was Khandaker Delwar Hossain, the former Secretary General of the Bangladesh National Party. Hossain spent his childhood in Manikganj.

On 25 June 1964, Hossain married Hosneara Begum Jharna (born 1942). Jharna served as a professor in the Department of Statistics in Rajshahi University. Together they had four sons and two daughters.

== Education ==
In 1944, Hossain matriculated from Victoria School, Manikgonj where he excelled in mathematics and Arabic studies. He went on to study at Debendra College and the Presidency College, Calcutta, India. In 1948, Hossain received a B.A. (Pass) degree from Calcutta University, with subjects including mathematics, English, Bengali and economics. The following year, he received an honors degree in mathematics, also from Calcutta University. Hossain's post-graduate achievements included an M.A. degree (1st class) from Dhaka University in statistics in 1950 and in 1954, a M.Sc in economics including studies at London University, Cambridge University and London School of Economics (LSE). Sir Maurice Kendall, (Maurice George Kendall) was Hossain's supervisor.

== Career ==
Hossain's work in academia spanned more than two decades. His first position was lecturer of mathematics at Dhaka University. Hossain spent the majority of his career in various posts in the Department of Statistics at Rajshahi University. From 1957 to 1959 Hossain was Assistant Chief Economist in the Social Science Division at the Planning Board of the East Pakistan Government. In 1968, Hossain spent a year as visiting fellow in the Department of Social Statistics, Birmingham University, United Kingdom.

== Professional affiliations ==
Hossain was a member of the 'Inter-University Social Science Research Council' of the Pakistan Government. He held the position of president in the Rajshahi and Bangladesh University Teachers' Associations. In 1977, Hossain was president of the 'Bangladesh Statistical Association'. Hossain was an elected member of the Senate, Finance Committee, and Academic Council of Rajshahi University. Hossain also attended a number of seminars and workshops in both Europe and Asia.
