= S. M. Abdul Mannan =

Bangladeshi politician

- এস. এম. আব্দুল মান্নান

Member of Parliament for Manikganj-2
- In office 25 January 2009 – 24 January 2014
- Preceded by: Samsuddin Ahmed
- Succeeded by: Momtaz Begum

Personal details
- Born: 15 December 1951 (age 74)
- Party: Jatiya Party (Ershad)

S. M. Abdul Mannan Chowdhury (born 15 December 1951) is a Jatiya Party (Ershad) politician and a former Jatiya Sangsad member representing the Manikganj-2 constituency.

== Early life ==
Mannan was born on 15 December 1951. He has a bachelor's degree in civil engineering.

== Career ==
Mannan is a director of Global Insurance Limited, Premier Leasing Limited, Delta Medical Centre, Delta Spinners Limited, and Mercantile Bank Limited. He had served a term as the President of Gulshan Club. He is a member of the board of governors of the Bangladesh Enterprise Institute.

Mannan was elected to Parliament from Manikganj-2 as a candidate of Jatiya Party in 2008. He was elected vice-chairperson of Premier Leasing and Finance Limited on 28 June 2009 and Mizanur Rahman Shelley was elected chairperson. He was a member of the Parliamentary Standing Committee on Industries Ministry.

While campaigning for the general elections in 2018 from Manikganj-2 constituency Mannan's motorcade was attacked allegedly by Awami League activists. Momtaz Begum, the Awami League candidate won the election. He received only 558 votes and came third in the election.
