= Nizam Uddin Khan =

Bangladeshi politician

Member of Parliament for Manikganj-3
- In office 11 November 1989 – 12 June 1996
- President: Hussain Muhammad Ershad
- Preceded by: Mohammad Abdul Malek
- Succeeded by: Abdul Wahab Khan

Personal details
- Died: 15 October 1996 Sydney, Australia
- Party: Bangladesh Nationalist Party

Nizam Uddin Khan (died 1996) was a Bangladesh Nationalist Party politician and a member of parliament for Dhaka-3 and Manikganj-3.

== Career ==
Khan was elected to parliament from Dhaka-3 as a Bangladesh Nationalist Party candidate in 1979. He was elected to parliament from Manikganj-3 as a Bangladesh Nationalist Party candidate in 1991, February 1996 and 12 June 1996.

== Death ==
Nizam Uddin Khan died in 1996.
