= Ghior Upazila =

Ghior ঘিওর
- Upazila
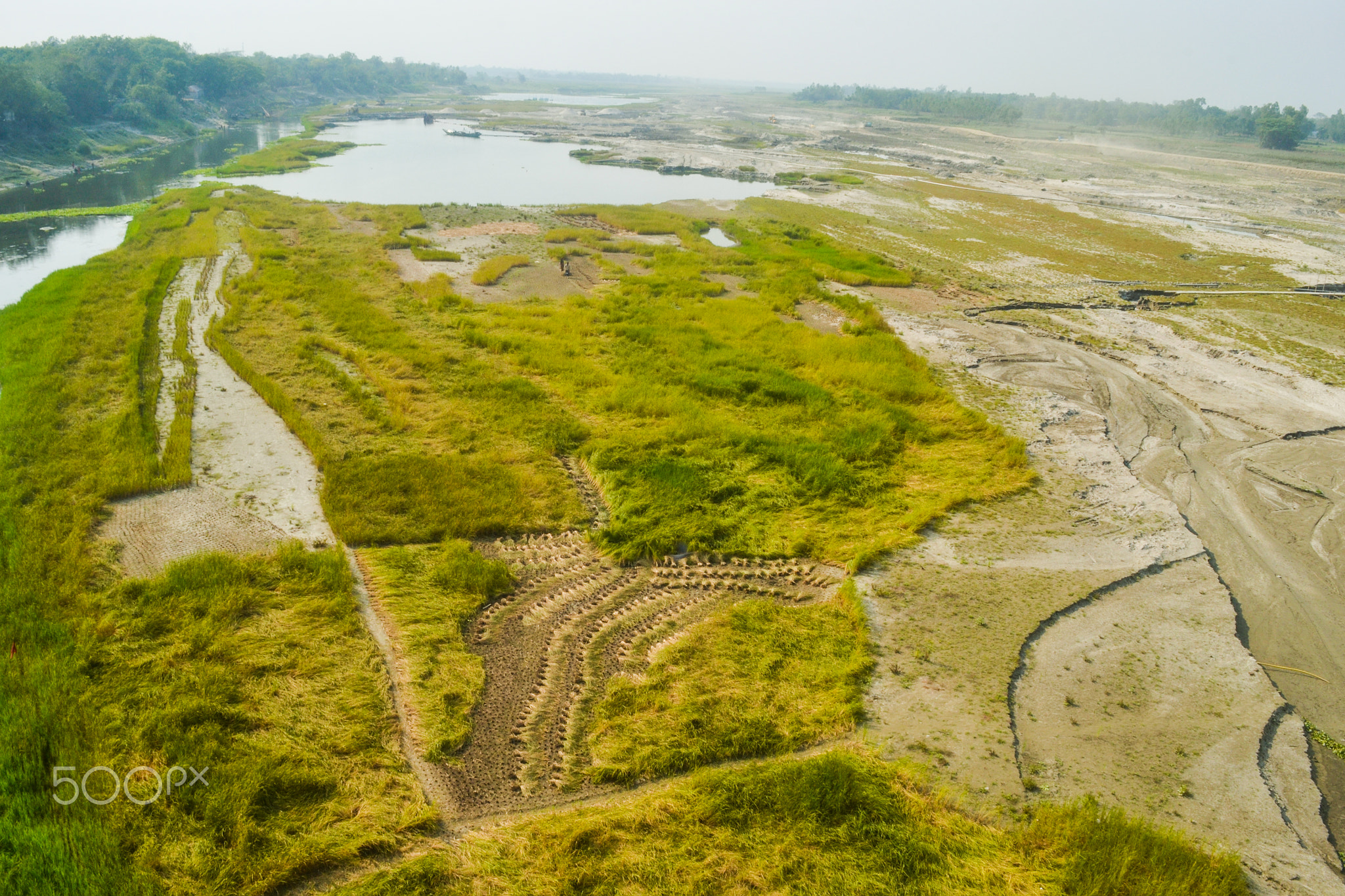
- Drone view of Ghior upazila

- Coordinates: 23.8875°N 89.8375°E
- Country: Bangladesh
- Division: Dhaka
- District: Manikganj
- Thana: 1919
- Upazila: 1983

Area
  - Upazila: 145.95 km^{2} (56.35 sq mi)
  - Metro: 4.24 km^{2} (1.64 sq mi)

Population (2022)
  - Upazila: 162,509
  - Density: 1,113.5/km^{2} (2,883.8/sq mi)
- Time zone: UTC+6 (BST)
- Postal code: 1840
- Website: gior.manikganj.gov.bd

Ghior Upazila mauza geocode map

Ghior (Bengali: ঘিওর) is an upazila (sub-district) of Manikganj District of central Bangladesh, located in the Dhaka Division. It is located at 23.8875°N 89.8375°E and is named after the town of Ghior. It is home to the Tarra Bridge, an overpass above the Dhaleshwari River, which is one of the major bridges of the country. The 53 km R506 road is one of the main roads of Ghior connecting the upazila to Dhaka and Tangail. Md. Nazmul Islam, Upazila Nirbahi Officer is the present Executive Head of the Upazila.

== Geography ==
Ghior Upazila has a total area of 145.95 km^{2}. It is bounded by Daulatpur Upazila on the north, Manikganj Sadar on the east, Shivalaya & Harirampur Upazila on the south and Sibalay Upazila on the west. Annual average temperatures reach a maximum of 36 °C and a minimum of 12.7 °C with the annual rainfall total being 2,376 mm (93.5 in). The main rivers are the Dhaleshwari River, Kaliganga River, Gangdubi River and Ichamati River. Other water sources include Kernal Nagar canal and the Bairagi beel.

== History ==
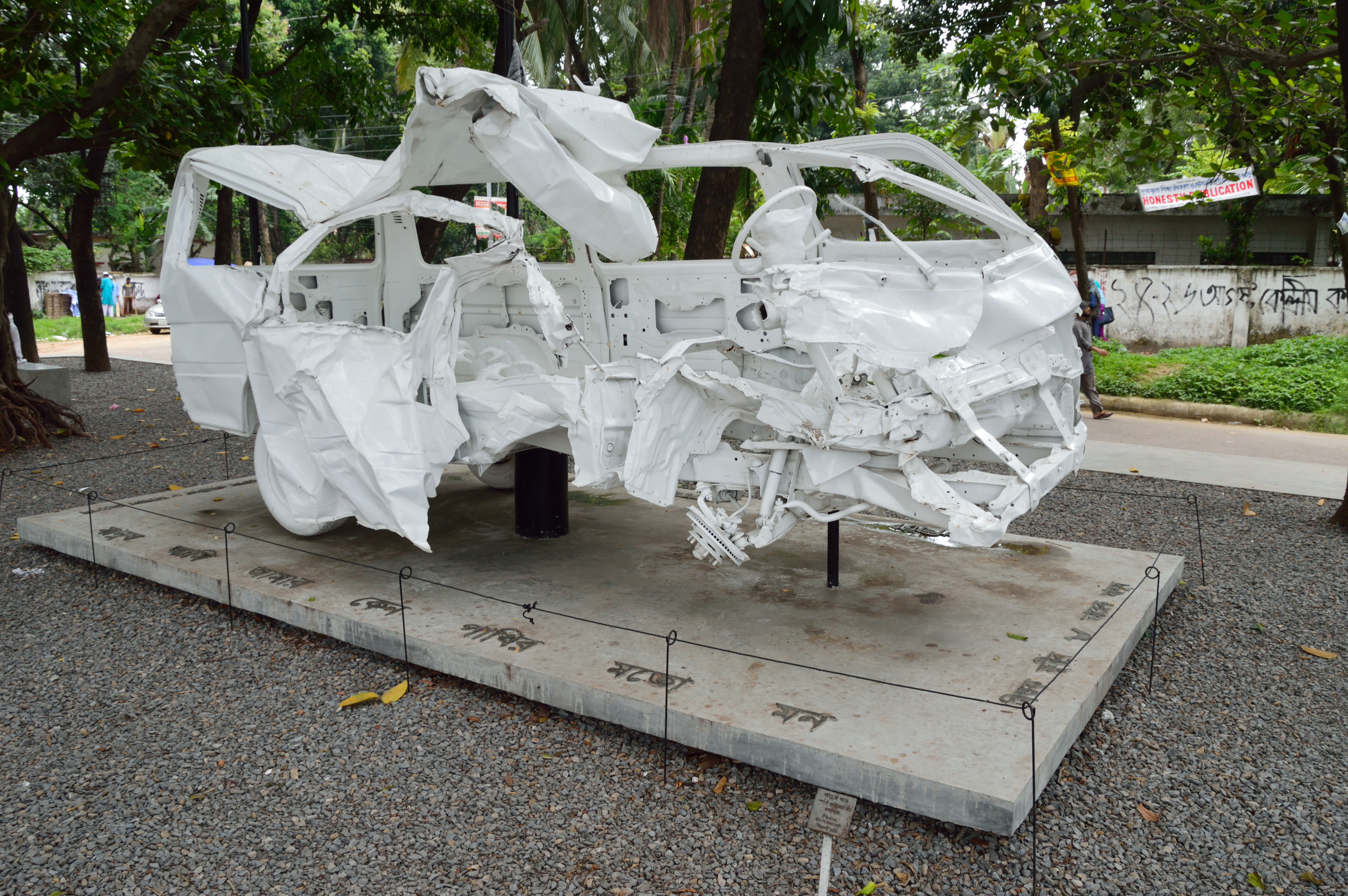
The Wreckage Microbus incident in Ghior is preserved at University of Dhaka Campus.

The history of Ghior dates back centuries, and an ancient Buddhist vihara was discovered in Sreebari Borotiya. After Ghior came under British colonial rule, seven Indigo dye factory (Neelkuthi) were built here; namely in Mirzapur, Nathpur, Paikara, Goalkhali, Mawacel, Bogla/Khetapara and Panchdubi. The Panchdubi building still stands today and is a notable attraction in the area. Ghior was established as a thana in 1919, and Babu Praphulla Chandra Sen served as its sub-registrar and was followed by Maulvi Minnat Ali. Maulvi Abu Yusuf Wahidul Haq was then appointed the role and succeeded by Maulvi Kazi Abdul Majid on 16 January 1924. On 16 September 1925, Maulvi Muhammad Asadur Rahaman was appointed the Sub-Registrar and Qadi of Ghior, and Maulvi Abul Fatah Muhammad Saleh temporarily replaced him on both roles for a period of time. He was then replaced by Maulvi Muhammad Mujibul Huq. On 5 August 1927, Huq was succeeded by Maulvi A. A. Muhammad Bakht - who was a substitute for Maulvi Mataheral Karim. Bijoy Govinda Guha was elected to represent Ghior in the Manikganj Local Board.

During the Bangladesh Liberation War of 1971, the Pakistan Army and its collaborators gunned down and murdered 41-43 innocent villagers in the village of Terasree on 22 November. Afsar Uddin Khan was a notable Bengali freedom fighter of Ghior. A memorial plate and memorial monument was successively established following the massacre in Terasri. In 1983, Ghior was upgraded to sub-district (upazila) level. In November 1983, a diarrhoea outbreak occurred in Ghior with hundreds affected and a number of deaths.

On 13 August 2011, a road accident happened in Joka on the Dhaka-Aricha highway with a microbus colliding head-on with an oncoming passenger bus. A number of members of the Kagojer Phool film crew, including acclaimed filmwriter Tareque Masud and cinematographer Mishuk Munier, died as a result.

== Demographics ==
Religions in Ghior Upazila (2022)
Religion	Percent
Islam	87.85%
Hinduism	12.11%
Other or not stated	0.04%

According to the 2022 Bangladeshi census, Ghior Upazila had 40,339 households and a population of 162,509. 7.60% of the population were under 5 years of age. Ghior had a literacy rate (age 7 and over) of 73.41%: 76.99% for males and 70.04% for females, and a sex ratio of 95.50 males for every 100 females. 12,935 (7.96%) lived in urban areas.

According to the 2011 Census of Bangladesh, Ghior Upazila had 34,796 households and a population of 146,292. 28,598 (19.55%) were under 10 years of age. Ghior had a literacy rate (age 7 and over) of 54.49%, compared to the national average of 51.8%, and a sex ratio of 1062 females per 1000 males. 6,635 (4.54%) lived in urban areas.

At the 2001 Bangladesh census, Ghior had a population of 1,55,907. Males constituted 50.16% of the population, and females 49.84%. The population of those aged 18 and older was 68,107. The vast majority of the population are Bengali Muslims. Ghior has 24413 households.

== Economy and tourism ==
54.3% of main sources of income come from agriculture. The next largest sectors are commerce (16.24%) and service (11.94%) respectively. Ghior has 24 Haat bazaar and 11 annual fairs.

Ghior has a number of places of attraction due to its rich and long history. It has an abandoned indigo factory (Nilkuthi) in Sribari Baratiya dating back to the colonial rule and an ancient Buddhist vihara in Pachthubi. In the village of Terashri, there are memorial monuments dedicated to the victims of the Bangladesh Liberation War as well as the Terashree Zamindar Bari. It also has over 118 mosques including the Dotra Masjid. There are two 200-year old Mazars (mausoleums) located in Bathaimuri (Nali Union). These are the shrines of Sufi saint Afaz Uddin Shah Pagla and his student Shariyat Ullah. The former's urs is celebrated on 28 January and a mela takes place for 10 days.

== Administration ==
Ghior Upazila is one of the seven Subdistricts of Manikganj District headed by an Executive Head called Upazila Nirbahi Officer or Subdistrict Executive Officer. Upazila Nirbahi Officer is also the Executive Magistrate of the Subdistrict and the president of the Subdistrict Law and Order Committee. Md. Nazmul Islam, Upazila Nirbahi Officer is the present Executive Head of the Upazila. Ghior is divided into seven union parishads: Balikhora, Baniazuri, Bartia, Ghior, Nalee, Paila, and Shingzuri. The union parishads are subdivided into 170 mauzas and 187 villages.

== Upazila Parishad ==
=== List of chairmen ===
List of chairmen
Name	Term	Notes
Nasir Uddin Bhuiyan	25/1/1985-1990	
Afzal Husayn Khan Zaki	1990-1995	
Afzal Husayn Khan Zaki	23/2/2009-20/4/2014	Second term
Muhammad Habibur Rahman	Present	

== Education ==
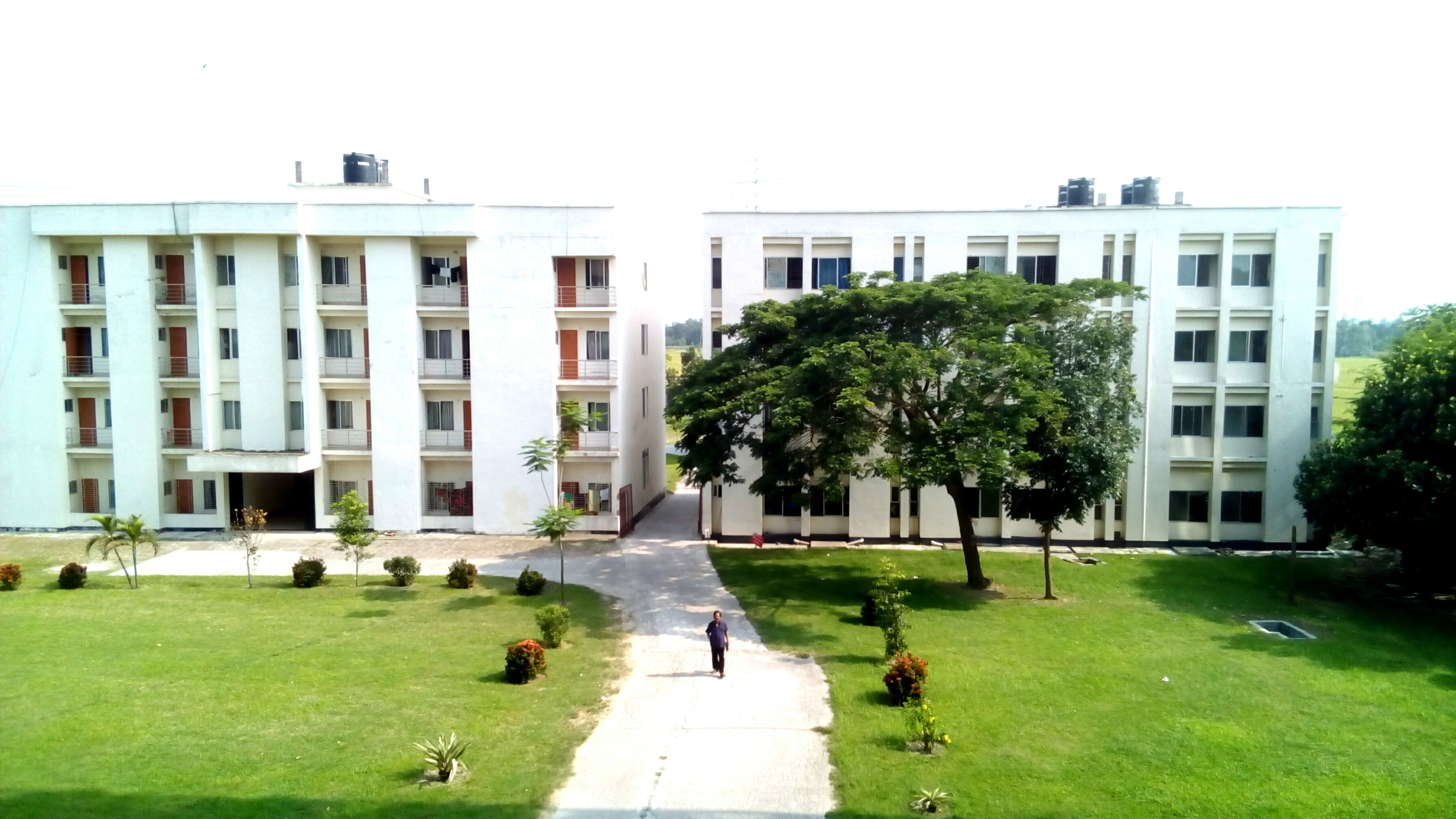
The Monno Medical College boys' hostel.

Ghior had an average literacy rate of 31.2% (7+ years), against the national average of 32.4%.

In 1922, the Terassree KN High School was established. The Ghior DN High School was then founded 4 years after that by Durga Narayan. The Baniajuri High School was established two years before the Partition of India. During Ghior's East Pakistan period, the Singjuri High School was built in 1966. In 2011, the Monno Medical College was founded by Harunur Rashid Khan Monno. The Ashraful Uloom Madrasah & Ammatunnisa Hifzkhana is a notable Qawmi Madrasah located in Kusta.

== Notable people ==
- Naimur Rahman, international cricketer and politician

== See also ==
- Upazilas of Bangladesh
- Districts of Bangladesh
- Divisions of Bangladesh
- Thanas of Bangladesh
- Union councils of Bangladesh
