= Mohammad Siddiqur Rahman =

Bangladeshi politician

Member of Bangladesh Parliament

Personal details
- Party: Jatiya Party (Ershad)

Mohammad Siddiqur Rahman is a Jatiya Party (Ershad) politician and a former member of parliament for Manikganj-1.

== Career ==
Rahman was elected to parliament from Manikganj-1 as a Jatiya Party candidate in 1986 and 1988.
