= Salauddin Mahmud =

Bangladeshi politician

- সালাউদ্দিন মাহমুদ

Member of the Bangladesh Parliament for Manikganj-1
- In office 30 January 2024 – 6 August 2024
- Preceded by: Naimur Rahman

Personal details
- Born: 5 August 1960 (age 66)
- Party: Bangladesh Awami League
- Occupation: Politician

Salauddin Mahmud (born 5 Aug 1960), also known as SM Zahid, is a Bangladeshi politician. He is a former Jatiya Sangsad member representing the Manikganj-1 constituency.
