= Afroza Khanam Rita =

Bangladeshi politician (born 1962)

- আফরোজা খানম রিতা
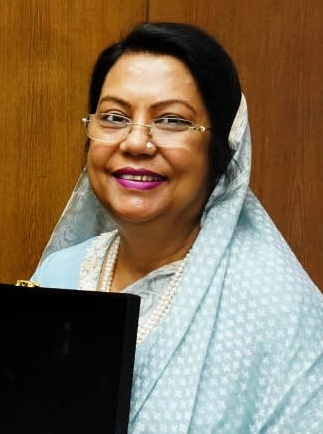
- Rita in 2026

Minister of food
- Incumbent
- Assumed office 21 August 2026
- Prime Minister: Tarique Rahman
- Preceded by: Amin ur Rashid Yasin

Member of Parliament
- Incumbent
- Assumed office 17 February 2026
- Preceded by: Zahid Maleque
- Constituency: Manikganj-3

Minister of Civil Aviation and Tourism
- In office 17 February 2026 – 21 August 2026
- Prime Minister: Tarique Rahman
- Preceded by: Sheikh Bashir Uddin
- Succeeded by: M. Rashiduzzaman Millat

Personal details
- Born: 4 April 1962 (age 64) Manikganj, East Pakistan, Pakistan
- Party: Bangladesh Nationalist Party
- Relations: Mahmudur Rahman (brother-in-law)
- Parent: Harunur Rashid Khan Monno (father)
- Occupation: Politician
- Website: afrozakhanamrita.com

Afroza Khanam Rita (born 4 April 1962) is a Bangladeshi politician. She is the incumbent Jatiya Sangsad member representing the Manikganj-3 constituency as a candidate of the Bangladesh Nationalist Party. She is the incumbent minister of food.

== Career ==
In February 2026, Rita won the 13th Bangladeshi general election contesting at the Manikganj-3 constituency securing 166,175 votes while her nearest opponent Bangladesh Khelafat Majlis candidate Md Sayid Nur received 62,916 votes.
