= Naimur Rahman =

Bangladeshi cricketer and politician

- নাইমুর রহমান
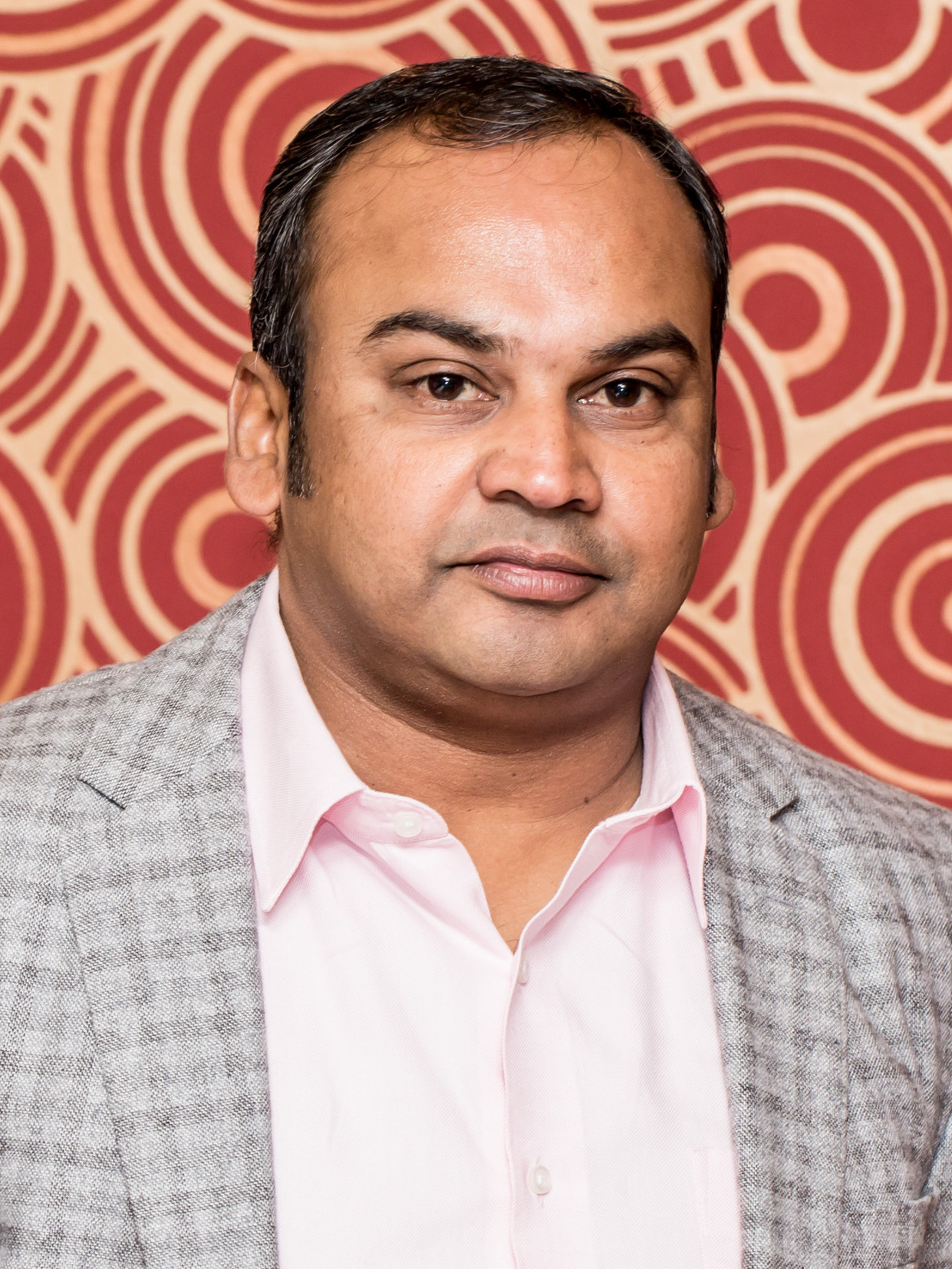
- Durjoy in Sydney, Australia (Feb 2015)

Member of the Bangladesh Parliament for Manikganj-1
- In office 29 January 2014 – 29 January 2024
- Preceded by: ABM Anowarul Haque
- Succeeded by: Salauddin Mahmud

Personal details
- Born: 19 September 1974 (age 52) Manikganj, Bangladesh
- Party: Bangladesh Awami League
- Spouse: Farhana Rahman Happy
- Occupation: Politician, cricketer
- Cricket career

Cricket information
- Batting: Right-handed
- Bowling: Right-arm offbreak

International information
- National side: Bangladesh
- Test debut (cap 9): 10 November 2000 v India
- Last Test: 8 December 2002 v West Indies
- ODI debut (cap 31): 8 April 1995 v Pakistan
- Last ODI: 3 December 2002 v West Indies
- ODI shirt no.: 24 (previously 8)

Career statistics
Competition	Test	ODI
Matches	8	29
Runs scored	210	488
Batting average	15.00	19.51
100s/50s	0/0	0/0
Top score	48	47
Balls bowled	1,321	1,094
Wickets	12	10
Bowling average	59.83	90.40
5 wickets in innings	1	0
10 wickets in match	0	0
Best bowling	6/132	2/51
Catches/stumpings	4/–	7/–
- Source: ESPNcricinfo, 12 February 2006

Naimur Rahman Durjoy (born 19 September 1974) is a Bangladeshi politician and retired cricketer. He is the former Jatiya Sangsad member from the Manikganj-1 constituency representing the Bangladesh Awami League party.

Durjoy served as the first captain of Bangladesh national cricket team. At international level, he played 8 Test and 29 ODI matches for the team.

== Cricket career ==
A right arm off spinner, Durjoy was a member of Bangladesh's 1997 ICC Trophy winning side. He became his country's inaugural Test captain when he led Bangladesh on their Test debut, against India in 2000. Durjoy took 6 wickets for 132 runs in India's first innings, including the wickets of legendary cricketers like Sachin Tendulkar and Sourav Ganguly.

After his retirement in 2002, Durjoy became the president of the Cricketers' Welfare Association of Bangladesh.

== Political career ==
On 26 November 2023, Awami League announced the final list of its 298 candidates to contest the 2024 national election which did not include Durjoy.

On 3 September 2024, almost a month after the fall of the Awami League government, Bangladesh Anti-Corruption Commission decided to launch an investigation into corruption allegations against Durjoy accusing him of money laundering, irregularities in projects, and illegally amassing wealth. The day after, on 4 September, he resigned from the board of the directors of Bangladesh Cricket Board. He was detained on 2 July 2025 by the Detective Branch and Manikganj District police.

== Personal life ==
Durjoy is married to Farhana Rahman Happy.

== See also ==
- List of Bangladesh cricketers who have taken five-wicket hauls on Test debut
