= Bangladesh Enterprise Institute =

Bangladesh Private Research Institute

- Formation: 2000
- Headquarters: Dhaka, Bangladesh
- Region served: Bangladesh
- Official language: Bengali
- Website: bei-bd.org

The Bangladesh Enterprise Institute (Bengali: বাংলাদেশ এন্টারপ্রাইজ ইনস্টিটিউট) is a private research institute and independent think tank. As of 2022 The institute is run by Farooq Sobhan and Ambassador M. Humayun Kabir, President.

== History ==
Bangladesh Enterprise Institute was established in October 2000. It purpose is to encourage the development of small and medium-sized enterprises in Bangladesh. The organization lobbies for reform of regulations and the encouragement of the free market. It is funded by its board of governors. It works with the United States-based International Republican Institute.

Bangladesh Enterprise Institute organizes conferences on economic and international affairs issues. In 2018, the Institute for Policy, Advocacy and Governance ranked Bangladesh Enterprise Institute on a list of Top Think Tanks in Southeast Asia and the Pacific region.

== Board of Governors ==
- Ragib Ali
- Khan Md. Ameer
- Tapan Chowdhury
- A. Matin Chowdhury
- Minhaz Kamal Khan
- Md Rafiqul Haque
- S M Abdul Mannan
- A S F Rahman
- Zulfiquar Rahman
- Abdul Hai Sarkar
- Altaf Hossain Sarkar
- Ramzul Seraj
- A K M Shamsuddoha
- M Abu Taher
- Farooq Sobhan
