= Harunur Rashid Khan Monno =

Bangladeshi politician

- হারুনুর রশিদ খান মুন্নু
- Monno

Member of Parliament
- In office 2001–2006
- Preceded by: Abdul Wahab Khan
- Succeeded by: Zahid Maleque
- Constituency: Manikganj-3
- In office 1991–2001
- Preceded by: Abdur Rauf Khan
- Succeeded by: Samsuddin Ahmed
- Constituency: Manikganj-2

Personal details
- Born: 17 August 1932 Dohar, Bengal, British India
- Died: 1 August 2017 (aged 84) Manikganj, Bangladesh
- Relations: Afroza Khanam Rita (daughter)
- Occupation: Industrialist, politician

Harunur Rashid Khan Monno (17 August 1932 – 1 August 2017) was a Bangladeshi industrialist and politician. He served as the chairman of his conglomerate, Monno Group of Industries. He was elected a member of parliament and a minister (without portfolio) of the government of Bangladesh. He was also an adviser to Bangladesh Nationalist Party Chairperson Khaleda Zia.

== Career ==
While Monno was a student of chartered accountancy, he joined Adamjee Haji Dawood's company in the accounts department. His first assignment was to print export register copies for the Adamjee conglomerate company. Within two years, he established a press company of his own. Later he established Monno Group of Industries, which included Monno Ceramics, Monno Jutex Industries, Monno Fabrics and Monno Attire Limited. He received lifetime achievement award at the 16th Bangladesh Business Awards.

Monno served as a Jatiya Sangsad member from the Manikganj-2 constituency during 1991–1996 and Manikganj-3 during 2001–2006. In 2001, he was selected a cabinet member without portfolio during the Khaleda Zia's administration. He lost the minister status in May 2003 when Zia was under pressure, especially from foreign donors, to downsize her cabinet.

== Personal life ==
Monno was married to Huron Nahar Rashid. Together they had two daughters – Afroza Khanam Rita and Firoza Mahmud Parvin. Afroza is serving as the managing director of Monno Group of Industries and also minister of civil aviation and tourism. She is married to Moynul Islam and mother of 3 boys Firoza is married to journalist and businessman Mahmudur Rahman.

== Death ==
Monno died 1 August 2017 in Monno Medical College and Hospital, Manikganj District, Bangladesh.

== See also ==
- Monno Medical College
