= Shivalaya Upazila =

Shivalaya শিবালয়
- Upazila
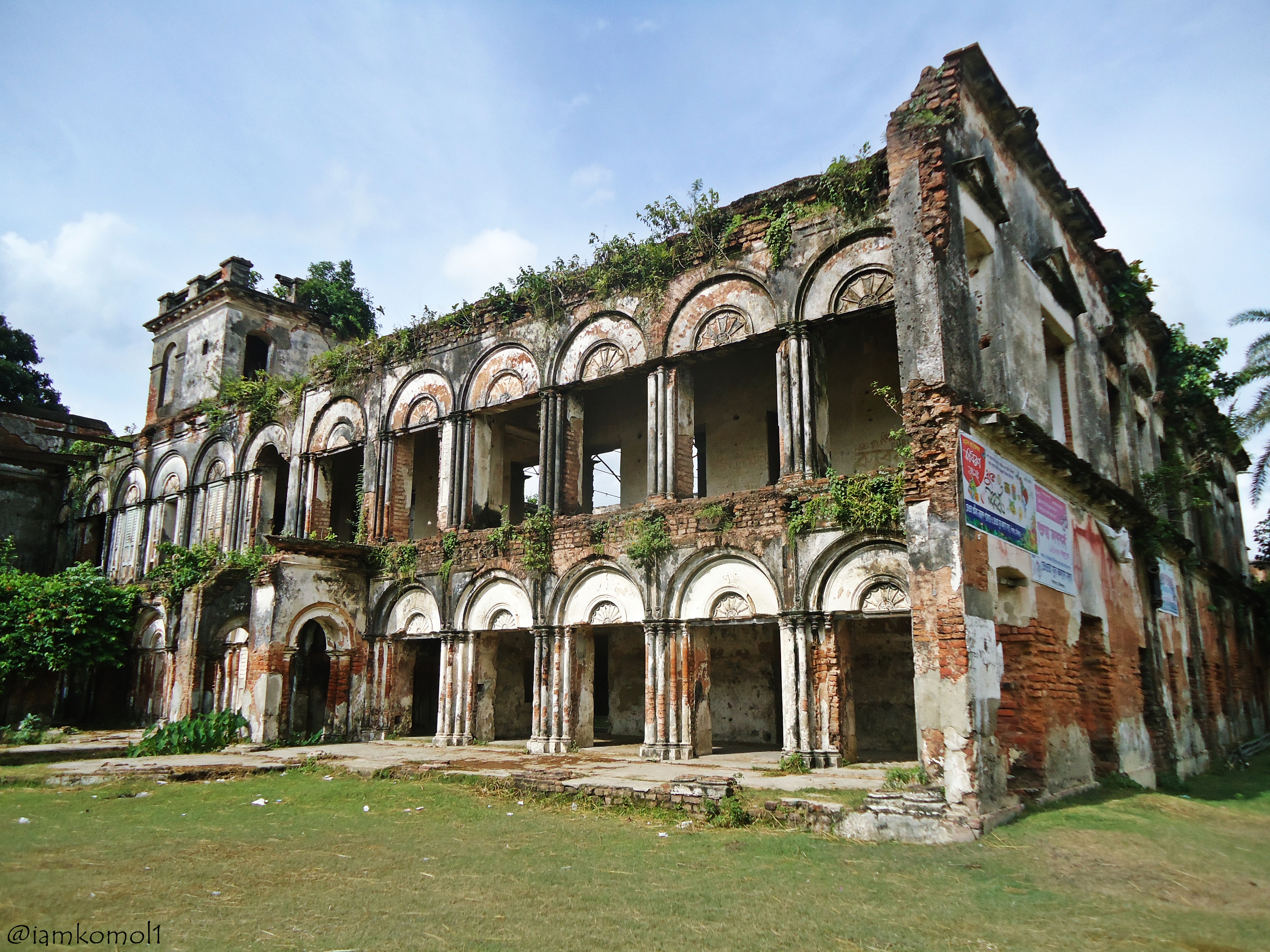
- Teota Zamindar Bari

- Coordinates: 23°50′N 89°47.5′E
- Country: Bangladesh
- Division: Dhaka
- District: Manikganj

Area
  - Total: 199.07 km^{2} (76.86 sq mi)

Population (2022)
  - Total: 187,462
  - Density: 941.69/km^{2} (2,439.0/sq mi)
- Time zone: UTC+6 (BST)
- Postal code: 1850
- Area code: 0651
- Website: Official Map of Shivalaya

Shivalaya (Bengali: শিবালয়, Shibaloy, meaning "Home of Shiva") is an upazila of Manikganj District in the Division of Dhaka, Bangladesh.

== Geography ==
Shivalaya is located at 23.8333°N 89.7917°E. Shivalaya's total area is 199.07 km^{2}.

== Demographics ==
Religions in Shivalaya Upazila (2022)
Religion	Percent
Islam	87.69%
Hinduism	12.14%
Other or not stated	0.17%

According to the 2022 Bangladeshi census, Shibalay Upazila had 46,443 households and a population of 187,462. 8.30% of the population were under 5 years of age. Shibalay had a literacy rate (age 7 and over) of 69.23%: 73.03% for males and 65.60% for females, and a sex ratio of 96.42 males for every 100 females. 16,847 (8.99%) lived in urban areas.

According to the 2011 Census of Bangladesh, Shivalaya Upazila had 40,795 households and a population of 171,873. 35,698 (20.77%) were under 10 years of age. Shivalaya had a literacy rate (age 7 and over) of 53.28%, compared to the national average of 51.8%, and a sex ratio of 1017 females per 1000 males. 5,202 (3.03%) lived in urban areas.

As of the 1991 Bangladesh census, Shivalaya has a population of 143842. Males constitute 52.42% of the population, and females 47.58%. This Upazila's eighteen up population is 75930. Shivalaya has an average literacy rate of 29.1% (7+ years), and the national average of 32.4% literate.

== Administration ==
Shivalaya Upazila is divided into seven union parishads: Arua, Mohadebpur, Shibaloy, Simulia, Teota, Ulayel, and Uthali. The union parishads are subdivided into 202 mauzas and 255 villages.

== Education ==
College:

- Sadar Uddin Degree College
- Mahadebpur Union Degree College, Barangail

High School:

- Shibalaya govt. High school
- Barangail G.C. High School
- Maloci High school
- Bajpara High School
- Uthali AGS High school

Primary School:-

- Oxford Academy, Shibalaya
- Barangail Govt. Primary School
- Chhota butni govt. Primary School

== See also ==
- Upazilas of Bangladesh
- Districts of Bangladesh
- Divisions of Bangladesh
