= Jahangirabad (disambiguation) =

Jahangirabad is a city in Uttar Pradesh, India.

Jahangirabad may also refer to:

- Jahangirabad, Ilam, Iran
- Jahangirabad, Lorestan, Iran
- Jahangirabad, Khoy, West Azerbaijan Province, Iran
- Jahangirabad Raj, Barabanki district, Uttar Pradesh, India
- Jehangirabad, a village in Khyber Pakhtunkhwa province, Pakistan

== See also ==
- Jahangir (disambiguation)
- Abad (disambiguation)
