= Jahangir (disambiguation) =

Jahangir (1569–1627) was the fourth Mughal Emperor.

Jahangir or Jehangir may also refer to:

- Jahangir (name), including a list of people with the given name
- Jahangir, Lorestan, a village in Iran
- Jahangir, Punjab, a village in India
- Jahangir-e Olya, a village in Iran
- Jehangir Art Gallery, in Mumbai, India

== See also ==
- Cihangir (disambiguation)
- Jahangirabad (disambiguation)
- Jahangirpur (disambiguation)
- Salim (disambiguation), birth name of the emperor
- Adil-E-Jahangir, 1955 Indian film about the emperor
- Tomb of Jahangir, the emperor's resting place in Lahore, Pakistan
- Jahangir Park, in Saddar, Karachi, Pakistan
- Jehangira, a town in Pakistan
