= Salma Masud Chowdhury =

Bangladeshi jurist

The Honourable Salma Masud Chowdhury
- সালমা মাসুদ চৌধুরী

Justice of the High Court Division of Bangladesh
- Incumbent
- Assumed office 29 July 2002

Personal details
- Born: 13 December 1957 (age 68) Moulvibazar, Sylhet, East Bengal, Dominion of Pakistan
- Spouse: Selim Ahmed
- Children: 1
- Education: University of Dhaka
- Profession: Justice

Salma Masud Chowdhury (born 13 December 1957) is a Bangladeshi judge of the High Court Division.

== Early life and education ==
She was born on 13 December 1957. Her mother is Aminun Nesa Khatun. Her father, Chowdhury A.T.M. Masud, was a justice of the High Court Division, Chief Election Commissioner of Bangladesh (from 17 February 1985 to 17 February 1990) and president of the National Heart Foundation. She has a bachelor of law and a master of law.

== Career ==
On 22 August 1981, Chowdhury became a lawyer in the district courts system. She became a lawyer of the High Court Division on 21 September 1983. She became a lawyer of the Appellate Division of Bangladesh Supreme Court on 14 May 1996.

Chowdhury was elevated as additional judge of the High Court Division on 29 July 2002. In January 2003, Chowdhury and Justices Hamidul Haq ordered the government to not harass and search the properties of Saber Hossain Chowdhury, an Awami League politician, in connection with three cases filed over the Mymensingh cinema bombings. Chowdhury and Justices Hamidul Haq declared the detention of Shahriar Kabir illegal. She was appointed permanent judge on 29 July 2004.

In July 2008, Chowdhury was one of eight judges who opposed the reinstatement of 10 judges who were denied a permanent position in the High Court Division by the last Bangladesh Nationalist Party government despite a recommendation of the chief justice. The 10 judges secured a High Court verdict in their favor ordering the government to reinstate them with seniority.

In July 2012, Chowdhury and Justice Md Mozibur Rahman Miah extended the bail of Tarique Rahman, a Bangladesh Nationalist Party politician, in an extortion case filed by Amin Ahmed, owner of Amin Mohammad Foundation, on 8 March 2007. On 1 November 2012, Chowdhury and Justice Ashish Ranjan Das summoned the officer in charge of Kachua Police Station, Md Monjur, for failing to prevent the extrajudicial punishment, canning of a woman under sharia law, in his area by a village arbitration committee. Chowdhury and Justice Ashish Ranjan Das also summoned the officer in charge of Ujirpur Police Station, Liton Pandey, for failure to prevent an attack on a school headmaster.

Chowdhury and Justice Mohammad Jahangir Hossain granted bail to Bangladesh Nationalist Party politician Ruhul Kabir Rizvi in a vandalism case. On 2 May 2013, Chowdhury and Justice Mohammad Jahangir Hossain granted bail to six politicians of the Bangladesh Nationalist Party: Abdullah Al Noman, Amanullah Aman, Gayeshwar Chandra Roy, Mirza Abbas, Syed Moazzem Hossain Alal, and Ruhul Kabir Rizvi. In September 2013, Chowdhury and Justice Zafar Ahmed asked the government to explain why it should not be directed to create a Formalin Control Act following a petition by advocate Eunus Ali Akond.

In May 2017, Chowdhury and Justice AKM Zahirul Hoque asked the officer-in-charge of Ashulia police station to explain why he had handcuffed a student who was receiving treatment at Enam Medical Hospital after falling sick at a protest of students of Jahangirnagar University. In July 2017, Chowdhury and Justice AKM Zahirul Hoque summoned the in a suo moto verdict summoned the civil surgeon of Patuakhali District and two doctors from Barisal Medical College Hospital and Niramoy Clinic after surgical gauge was recovered from the abdomen of a patient.

Chowdhury is a member of the executive council of the National Heart Foundation of Bangladesh. In August 2019, she along with Justice Quazi Reza-Ul Hoque and Justice AKM Zahirul Hoque has been barred from work over corruption allegations. Chowdhury and Zahirul Haque were suspended for issuing a verdict in favor of MR Trading. The Bangladesh Supreme Court asked the three to not perform judicial activities. Since then her judicial activities remained suspended until her mandatory retirement.

She retired on 12 December 2024 at mandatory retirement age of 67 year.

== Personal life ==
Chowdhury is married to Selim Ahmed, a businessperson. They have a son, Shafayat Ahmed.
