= Dhaka-5 =

Constituency of Bangladesh's Jatiya Sangsad

Coordinates: 23.71°N 90.44°E

- Constituency for the Jatiya Sangsad
- District: Dhaka District
- Division: Dhaka Division
- Electorate: 419,996 (2026)

Current constituency
- Created: 1973
- Party: Bangladesh Jamaat-e-Islami
- Member: Mohammad Kamal Hossain
- ← 177 Dhaka-4 179 Dhaka-6 →

Dhaka-5 is a constituency represented in the Jatiya Sangsad (National Parliament) of Bangladesh since 2026 by Mohammad Kamal Hossain of the Bangladesh Jamaat-e-Islami.

== Boundaries ==
The constituency encompasses Dhaka South City Corporation wards 48 through 50 and 62 through 70.

== History ==
The constituency was created for the first general elections in newly independent Bangladesh, held in 1973.

Ahead of the 2008 general election, the Bangladesh Election Commission redrew constituency boundaries to reflect population changes revealed by the 2001 Bangladesh census. The 2008 redistricting altered the boundaries of the constituency.

As of 2008, the constituency encompassed Dhaka South City Corporation wards 48 through 50, and four union parishads of Demra, Jatrabari, and Shyampur thanas: Dhania, Demra, Matuail, and Sarulia.

In 2025, the Election Commission changed the boundaries of the constituency to encompass Dhaka South City Corporation wards 48 through 50 and 62 through 70.

== Members of Parliament ==
Election	Member	Party
1973	Shah Moazzem Hossain	Awami League
1979	Muhammad Hamidullah Khan	Bangladesh Nationalist Party
1986	AKM Rahmat Ullah	Awami League
1988	Mohammad Siraj Uddin Ahmed	Independent
Sep 1991 by-election	Mohammad Quamrul Islam	Bangladesh Nationalist Party
Feb 1996	Mohammad Quamrul Islam	Bangladesh Nationalist Party
Jun 1996	AKM Rahmat Ullah	Awami League
2001	Mohammad Quamrul Islam	Bangladesh Nationalist Party
2008	Habibur Rahman Mollah	Awami League
2020 by-election	Kazi Monirul Islam Manu	Awami League
2024	Moshiur Rahman Mollah	Independent
2026	Mohammad Kamal Hossain	Bangladesh Jamaat-e-Islami

== Elections ==
=== Elections in the 2020s ===
General Election 2026: Dhaka-5
Party	Candidate	Votes	%	±%
Jamaat	Mohammad Kamal Hossain	96,641	48.0	N/A
BNP	Md. Nabi Ulla	87,491	43.4	N/A
IAB	Md. Ibrahim	14,206	7.1	N/A
JP(E)	Mir Abdus Sobur	1,346	0.7	N/A
LDP	Md. Humayun Kabir	788	0.4	N/A
BCP	Md. Saiful Alam	262	0.1	N/A
BSD (Marxist)	Sahinur Akter Sumi	221	0.1	N/A
CPB	Tofazzal Hossain Mostofa	206	0.1	N/A
GOP	Sayed Mohammad Ibrahim	93	0.0	N/A
Labour	Md. Golam Azom	81	0.0	N/A
BSM	Md. Taifur Rahman Rahi	35	0.0	N/A
Majority		9,150	4.5	N/A
Turnout		201,370	47.9	N/A
Registered electors		419,996		
Jamaat gain from Independent				

=== Elections in the 2010s ===
General Election 2018: Dhaka-5
Party	Candidate	Votes	%	±%
AL	Habibur Rahman Mollah	220,083	76.4	+23.4
BNP	Md Nabiullah	67,572	23.4	−11.1
Majority		152,511	53.0	+34.5
Turnout		289,002	64.0	+7.0
Registered electors		450,608		
AL hold				

General Election 2014: Dhaka-5
Party	Candidate	Votes	%	±%
AL	Habibur Rahman Mollah	108,038	95.0	+41.1
BTF	Arju Shah Sayedabadi	2,442	2.1	+2.0
JP(E)	Md. Monir Hossain Komol	1,748	1.5	−2.6
NAP	Md. Abdur Rashid	1,439	1.3	+0.8
Majority		105,596	92.9	+74.1
Turnout		113,669	27.7	−50.8
AL hold				

=== Elections in the 2000s ===
General Election 2008: Dhaka-5
Party	Candidate	Votes	%	±%
AL	Habibur Rahman Mollah	153,144	53.9	+11.3
BNP	Salah Uddin Ahmed	99,895	35.2	−18.8
JP(E)	Syed Abu Hossain	17,246	6.1	N/A
IAB	ATM Hemayet Uddin	9,247	3.3	N/A
NAP	Md. Abdur Rashid	1,364	0.5	N/A
Zaker Party	Md. Abu Bakar Siddik Khan	1,227	0.4	N/A
PDP	Md. Khalekuzzaman Chowdhury	444	0.2	N/A
BTF	Md. Sanowar Hossen	312	0.1	N/A
BSD	Zulfiker Ali	201	0.1	N/A
BKA	Md. Abul Hossen	178	0.1	0.0
Independent	Mazedur Rahman Khan	157	0.1	N/A
Jatiya Samajtantrik Dal-JSD	Md. Wali Ullah Patuary	113	0.0	N/A
KSJL	Nazma Akter	105	0.0	N/A
Ganatantri Party	Minhaz Uddin Ahmed	93	0.0	N/A
Bangladesh Kalyan Party	Zamir Ahmed	75	0.0	N/A
Gano Forum	Md. Safar Ali	68	0.0	N/A
Majority		53,249	18.8	+7.4
Turnout		283,869	78.5	+16.7
AL gain from BNP				

General Election 2001: Dhaka-5
Party	Candidate	Votes	%	±%
BNP	Mohammad Quamrul Islam	211,440	54.0	+14.8
AL	AKM Rahmat Ullah	166,832	42.6	−4.9
IJOF	Md. Alfaz Uddin	11,558	3.0	N/A
JSD	Md. Amir Ali Mattabbar	579	0.1	0.0
BKA	Mizanur Rahman Juktibadi	424	0.1	0.0
Independent	S. M. Amzad Ali	253	0.1	N/A
Independent	Rizwanul Islam Rubel	92	0.0	N/A
KSJL	Laskar Keramat Ali	89	0.0	N/A
Independent	Md. Shahadat Hossain	57	0.0	N/A
Majority		44,608	11.4	+3.1
Turnout		391,324	61.8	−6.6
BNP gain from AL				

=== Elections in the 1990s ===
General Election June 1996: Dhaka-5
Party	Candidate	Votes	%	±%
AL	AKM Rahmat Ullah	132,443	47.5	
BNP	Mohammad Quamrul Islam	109,370	39.2	
JP(E)	Kazi Golam Dostagir	24,557	8.8	
Jamaat	Md. Asraful Haque	7,366	2.6	
Zaker Party	Md. Momin Uddin Sarder	1,589	0.6	
IOJ	Mojir Uddin Ahmed	1,431	0.5	
Democratic Republican Party	Md. Anisuzzaman Khokon	665	0.2	
Gano Forum	Zamil Chowdhury	506	0.2	
JSD	Abul Hossain	257	0.1	
BKA	Mizanur Rahman Juktibadi	199	0.1	
Bangladesh Samajtantrik Dal (Khalekuzzaman)	Anisuzzaman Bhuyan	128	0.1	
Jatiya Samajtantrik Dal-JSD	Liaqat Hossain	99	0.0	
Independent	Md. Azizur Rahman	81	0.0	
Independent	Md. Zahirul Haque	81	0.0	
Jatiya Janata Party (Nurul Islam)	Md. Hannan Hossain Chowdhury	67	0.0	
FP	Fakhrul Ahsan Rana	56	0.0	
Jana Dal	Mina Rahman	44	0.0	
Majority		23,073	8.3	
Turnout		278,939	68.4	
AL gain from BNP				

Khaleda Zia stood for five seats in the 1991 general election: Bogra-7, Dhaka-5, Dhaka-9, Feni-1, and Chittagong-8. After winning all five, she chose to represent Feni-1 and quit the other four, triggering by-elections in them. Mohammad Quamrul Islam of the BNP was elected in a September 1991 by-election.

General Election 1991: Dhaka-5
Party	Candidate	Votes	%	±%
BNP	Khaleda Zia	71,266	51.5	
AL	Sahara Khatun	45,811	33.1	
Independent	Mohammad Siraj Uddin Ahmed	10,725	7.7	
JP(E)	Golam Kadir	3,947	2.9	
Zaker Party	Md. Kaiser Hamid	2,827	2.0	
Bangladesh Janata Party	Saidul Islam Montu	1,920	1.4	
BKA	Mizanur Rahman Juktibadi	821	0.6	
Independent	Mojammal Huq	436	0.3	
Jatiya Samajtantrik Dal-JSD	Ataul Karim Faruk	202	0.1	
Janata Mukti Party	Shamsur Rahman	168	0.1	
Independent	G M L Kabir	104	0.1	
Bangladesh Republican Party	Shirajul Huq	80	0.1	
Bangladesh Jatiya Tanti Dal	Md. Yakub	49	0.0	
Independent	Md. Abul Hasan	29	0.0	
Janasakti Party	Md. Abdullah Al Naser	26	0.0	
Bangladesh Muslim League (Kader)	A. H. M. Amzad Hossian	20	0.0	
Jatiyatabadi Gonotantrik Chashi Dal	Afzaluddin Chowdhury	14	0.0	
Majority		25,455	18.4	
Turnout		138,445	47.7	
BNP gain from JP(E)				
