= Jahangirpur =

Jahangirpur may refer to:

- Jahangirpur, Kapurthala, Punjab, India
- Jhangirpur, Maharashtra, India
- Jahangirpur, Uttar Pradesh, Uttar Pradesh, India
- Jahangirpur Govt. College, Bangladesh
- Jangipur, Murshidabad, West Bengal, India
- Jahangirpur, Firozabad, a village in Uttar Pradesh, India
- Jahangirpuri (Delhi Metro), station of the Delhi Metro in India

== See also ==
- Jahangir (disambiguation)
- Pur (disambiguation)
- Jangipur (disambiguation)
