= Mohammad Jahangir Hossain =

Bangladeshi judge

Justice of the High Court Division of Bangladesh
- Incumbent
- Assumed office 22 February 1984

Personal details
- Born: February 1, 1959 (age 67)
- Education: University of Dhaka
- Profession: Judge

Mohammad Jahangir Hossain is a judge of the High Court Division of Bangladesh Supreme Court.

== Early life ==
Hossain was born on 1 February 1959. He completed his bachelor's degree and masters in law from the University of Dhaka.

== Career ==
Hossain joined the Bangladesh Judicial Service on 22 February 1984 as a Munsif.

Hossain served as an Additional District Judge and later a judge on Artha-Rin Adalat, loan coats. He was a judge of the Prevention of Cruelty against Women and Children Court.

Hossain served as a judge in the United Nations Transitional Administration in East Timor.

On 20 October 2011, Hossain was appointed an Additional Judge of the High Court Division of Bangladesh Supreme Court. Bangladesh Nationalist Party aligned leaders Supreme Court Bar Association opposed the appointment and boycotted the event.

On 22 June 2012, Hossain and justice Hasan Foez Siddique gave a verdict in favor of Bangladesh Securities and Exchange Commission confirming its ability to regulate companies listed on the stock exchanges in Bangladesh.

Hossain and Justice Salma Masud Chowdhury granted bail to Bangladesh Nationalist Party politician Ruhul Kabir Rizvi in a vandalism case. On 2 May 2013, Hossain and Justice Salma Masud Chowdhury granted bail to six politicians of Bangladesh Nationalist Party, Abdullah Al Noman, Amanullah Aman, Gayeshwar Chandra Roy, Mirza Abbas, Syed Moazzem Hossain Alal, and Ruhul Kabir Rizvi. On 26 June 2013, Chowdhury and Justice M Muazzam Hossain extended Tarique Rahman's bail for three months in a tax evasion case and another extortion case. On 24 July, Hossain and Justice Salma Masud Chowdhury granted bail to a journalist who had been assaulted by Member of Parliament Golam Maula Rony.

On 25 July 2017, Hossain and Justice Jahangir Hossain Selim commuted the death sentences of two Jama'atul Mujahideen Bangladesh to life sentences for their role in the 2005 Bangladesh bombings.

Hossain became a permanent judge of the High Court Division on 7 October 2013.
