= A. K. M. Zahirul Hoque =

Bangladeshi Judge

The Honourable A. K. M. Zahirul Hoque

Justice of the High Court Division of Bangladesh
- Incumbent
- Assumed office 7 October 1984

Personal details
- Born: 31 January 1959 (age 67)
- Profession: Judge

A. K. M. Zahirul Hoque (born 31 January 1959) is a justice of the High Court Division of the Bangladesh Supreme Court. He has been barred from his role following allegations of irregularities.

== Early life ==
Zahirul Hoque was born on 31 January 1959. He has a bachelors of science and another bachelors in law.

== Career ==
Zahirul Hoque started his legal practice on 7 October 1984 in District Courts.

On 11 July 1990, Zahirul Hoque became a lawyer of the High Court Division and the Bangladesh Supreme Court on 27 December 2002.

Zahirul Hoque was appointed an Additional Judge of the High Court Division on 18 April 2010 by President M Zillur Rahman. The swearing in ceremony of Zahirul Hoque and 14 other judges was not attended by judges of the Appellate Division in an unprecedented incident. He had previously served as the Additional Attorney General of Bangladesh. In August, Hoque and Justice Syed Muhammad Dastagir Husain granted bail to ANM Ehsanul Haque Milon, former state minister, in an extortion case.

Zahirul Hoque was made a permanent judge on 15 April 2012.

In August 2015, Zahirul Hoque and Justice Mirza Hussain Haider stopped the move to transfer a domestic violence case against an army officer to military court. They also sought an explanation on why Major General Mijanur Rahman Khan letter to Women and Children Repression Prevention Tribunal of Tangail requesting the transfer should not be declared illegal.

In May 2017, Zahirul Hoque and Justice Salma Masud Chowdhury asked the Officer-in-Charge of Ashulia station of Bangladesh Police to explain why he had handcuffed a student who was receiving treatment at Enam Medical Hospital after falling sick at a protest of students of Jahangirnagar University.

Zahirul Hoque and Justice Obaidul Hassan rejected the bail petition of former Prime Minister Khaleda Zia.

In 2019, Chief Justice Syed Mahmud Hossain, after consulting with President Abdul Hamid, suspended Zahirul Hoque, Justice Salma Masud Chowdhury, and Justice Quazi Reza-Ul Haque of the High Court Division. Zahirul Hoque and Chowdhury were suspended for issuing an illegal order to a lower court to give a verdict in favor of MR Trading Company.
