= Dhaka-3 =

Constituency of Bangladesh's Jatiya Sangsad

Coordinates: 23.70°N 90.34°E

- Constituency for the Jatiya Sangsad
- District: Dhaka District
- Division: Dhaka Division
- Electorate: 362,159 (2026)

Current constituency
- Created: 1973
- Party: Bangladesh Nationalist Party
- Member: Gayeshwar Chandra Roy
- ← 175 Dhaka-2 177 Dhaka-4 →

Dhaka-3 is a constituency represented in the Jatiya Sangsad (National Parliament) of Bangladesh since 2026 by Gayeshwar Chandra Roy of the Bangladesh Nationalist Party.

== Boundaries ==
The constituency encompasses five union parishads of Keraniganj Upazila: Aganagar, Konda, Subhadya, Tegharia, and Zinjira.

== History ==
The constituency was created for the first general elections in newly independent Bangladesh, held in 1973.

Ahead of the 2008 general election, the Election Commission redrew constituency boundaries to reflect population changes revealed by the 2001 Bangladesh census. The 2008 redistricting altered the boundaries of the constituency.

== Members of Parliament ==
Election	Member	Party
1973	Mofizul Islam Khan Kamal	Awami League
1979	Nizam Uddin Khan	Bangladesh Nationalist Party
1986	Mostafa Mohsin Montu	Jatiya Party
1988	Md. Saifur Rahman	Jatiya Party
1991	Amanullah Aman	Bangladesh Nationalist Party
Feb 1996	Amanullah Aman	Bangladesh Nationalist Party
Jun 1996	Amanullah Aman	Bangladesh Nationalist Party
2008	Nasrul Hamid	Awami League
2014	Nasrul Hamid	Awami League
2018	Nasrul Hamid	Awami League
2024	Nasrul Hamid	Awami League
2026	Gayeshwar Chandra Roy	Bangladesh Nationalist Party

== Elections ==
=== Elections in the 2020s ===
General Election 2026: Dhaka-3
Party	Candidate	Votes	%	±%
BNP	Gayeshwar Chandra Roy	99,163	51.9	N/A
Jamaat	Md. Shahinur Islam	83,264	43.6	N/A
IAB	Md. Sultan Ahmad Khan	6,286	3.3	N/A
JP(E)	Md. Faruk	1,075	0.6	N/A
GSA	Md. Bachchu Bhuiyan	387	0.2	N/A
Independent	Md. Monir Hossain	313	0.2	N/A
BSD	Mojibur Howladar	196	0.1	N/A
Gano Forum	Muhammad Roshan Yazdani	182	0.1	N/A
BCP	Mohammad Zafar	155	0.1	N/A
GOP	Md. Sajjad	97	0.1	N/A
Majority		15,899	8.3	N/A
Turnout		191,118	52.8	N/A
Registered electors		362,159		
BNP gain from AL				

=== Elections in the 2010s ===
Nasrul Hamid was re-elected unopposed in the 2014 general election after opposition parties withdrew their candidacies in a boycott of the election.

=== Elections in the 2000s ===
General Election 2008: Dhaka-3
Party	Candidate	Votes	%	±%
AL	Nasrul Hamid	112,623	58.5	+24.8
BNP	Gayeshwar Chandra Roy	70,680	36.7	−27.5
IAB	Md. Sultan Ahamed Khan	7,176	3.7	N/A
Zaker Party	Kaisar Alam Topu	1,637	0.9	N/A
BKA	Md. Fokrul Islam	394	0.2	−0.1
Majority		41,943	21.8	−8.7
Turnout		192,510	76.8	+8.8
AL gain from BNP				

General Election 2001: Dhaka-3
Party	Candidate	Votes	%	±%
BNP	Amanullah Aman	169,980	64.2	+4.3
AL	Nasrul Hamid	89,375	33.7	+8.3
IJOF	Md. Saiful Islam	4,108	1.6	N/A
BKA	Abu Zafar Quasemi	922	0.3	+0.1
Independent	Md. Moniruzzaman Rubel	383	0.1	N/A
JSD	Habibur Rahman	203	0.1	N/A
Majority		80,605	30.4	−4.1
Turnout		264,971	68.0	−7.3
BNP hold				

=== Elections in the 1990s ===
General Election June 1996: Dhaka-3
Party	Candidate	Votes	%	±%
BNP	Amanullah Aman	124,096	59.9	+2.6
AL	Md. Shah Jahan	52,662	25.4	−13.6
JP(E)	Md. Saifur Rahman	22,093	10.7	+9.9
Islamic Sashantantrik Andolan	Md. Nazrul Islam	3,131	1.5	N/A
Jamaat	Md. Abul Hasem	1,859	0.9	N/A
Zaker Party	Alamgir Hossain	1,734	0.8	−0.7
Independent	A. Samad	461	0.2	N/A
Democratic Republican Party	Sk. Salah Uddin Ahmed	404	0.2	N/A
BKA	Jalal Uddin	351	0.2	N/A
Bangladesh Tafsil Jati Federation (S.K. Mandal)	Sri Sawpon Kumar Mandal	187	0.1	N/A
Bangladesh Tafsili Federation (Sudir)	Sudir Chandra Sarker	150	0.1	N/A
Majority		71,434	34.5	+16.2
Turnout		207,128	75.3	+16.6
BNP hold				

General Election 1991: Dhaka-3
Party	Candidate	Votes	%	±%
BNP	Amanullah Aman	97,299	57.3	
AL	Mostafa Mohsin Montu	66,220	39.0	
Zaker Party	Alamgir Hossain	2,580	1.5	
Jamaat	Md. Abul Hasem	1,676	1.0	
JP(E)	Obaidur Rahman	1,372	0.8	
JSD (Rab)	Md. Hafizur Rahman	348	0.2	
NDP	Md. Abul Hossain	304	0.2	
Majority		31,079	18.3	
Turnout		169,799	58.7	
BNP gain from JP(E)				
