= Zahangir =

Zahangir is a masculine given name. Notable people with the name include:

- Zahangir Alam (born 1979), Bangladeshi politician
- Zahangir Hossain Helal (fl. from 2026), Bangladeshi politician

== See also ==
- Jahangir (name)
