= Jahangir (name) =

Jahangir جهانگیر
- Pronunciation: Persian pronunciation: [d͡ʒahɑːn'giːr]
- Gender: Male

Origin
- Origin: Persian
- Meaning: Conqueror of the world
- Region of origin: Western Asia

Other names
- Related names: Cihangir, Jangear, Jangir

Jahangir or Jangir or Jehangir (Persian: جهانگیر, 'Conqueror of the world') is a Persian male given name. Jahan means world or universe, while Gir means conqueror. In the Turkish language, its form is Cihangir. In many English speaking countries, Jahangir can also be spelled as Zhangir or Jangear

== People with the name ==
- Jahangir (1569-1627), 4th Mughal emperor of India
- Jahangir II (1703-1746), claimant to the Mughal throne
- Jahangir III, Paduspanid ruler
- Jahangir IV (died 1598), Paduspanid ruler
- Cihangir Ghaffari (born 1940), Iranian actor
- Jahangir Hasanzade (born 1979), Azerbaijani footballer
- Salqam Jangir Khan (1610-1652), khan of the Kazakh Khanate
- Jahangir Khoja (1788-1828), Uyghur rebel against Qing rule in Kashgar
- Jahangir Mirza (1472-1515), Dughlat prince and ruler of Yarkand
- Jahangir Mirza (Timurid prince) (1356-1376), a son of Timur
- Jahangir (Aq Qoyunlu) (died 1469), Aq Qoyunlu ruler
- Jahangir Mirza Qajar (1810/11-1853), Iranian prince and historian of the Qajar dynasty
- Jahangir Tafazzoli (1914–1991), Iranian politician
- Majid Jahangir Khan (born 1946), nicknamed Majestic Khan a Pakistani cricketer and captain
- Homi Jehangir Bhabha (1909-1966), Indian nuclear scientist
- Jehangir Ratanji Dadabhoy Tata (1904-1993), Indian industrialist, philanthropist, aviator
- Jehangir Nusli Wadia (born 1973), Indian businessman
- Feroze Jehangir Gandhi (1912-1960), Indian politician
- Jahangir Mohammad Adel (died 2014), deputy mayor of Dhaka, Bangladesh
- Jahangir Shah (born 1949), Bangladeshi cricketer
- Jahangir Harun (born 1966), Bangladeshi army major general
- Mohammad Jahangir Osman (died 2002), Bangladeshi freedom fighter and politician
- Jahangir Al Mustahidur Rahman (born 1967), Bangladeshi army major general
- Jahangir Husain, multiple people
  - Jahangir Hossain (born 1959), Bangladeshi judge
  - Mohammad Jahangir Hossain (born 1959), Bangladeshi High Court judge
  - AKM Jahangir Hossain (1954-2020), Bangladeshi politician
- Jahangir Kabir, multiple people
  - Shah Jahangir Kabir (1935–2013), Bangladeshi politician
  - Jahangir Kabir Nanak (born 1954), Bangladeshi textiles minister
  - Jahangir Kabir, Bangladeshi politician
- Jahangir Alam (disambiguation), multiple people
- Jahangir Khan (disambiguation), multiple people

== See also ==
- Jahangir (surname), list of people with the surname
- Cihangir (disambiguation)
