= Dhaka-4 =

Constituency of Bangladesh's Jatiya Sangsad

Coordinates: 23.69°N 90.43°E

- Constituency for the Jatiya Sangsad
- District: Dhaka District
- Division: Dhaka Division
- Electorate: 362,506 (2026)

Current constituency
- Created: 1973
- Party: Bangladesh Jamaat-e-Islami
- Member: Syed Zainul Abedin
- ← 176 Dhaka-3 178 Dhaka-5 →

Dhaka-4 is a constituency represented in the Jatiya Sangsad (National Parliament) of Bangladesh since 2026 by Syed Zainul Abedin of the Bangladesh Jamaat-e-Islami.

== Boundaries ==
The constituency encompasses Dhaka South City Corporation wards 47 and 51 through 54, and one union parishad of Shyampur Thana: Shyampur.

== History ==
The constituency was created for the first general elections in newly independent Bangladesh, held in 1973.

Ahead of the 2008 general election, the Bangladesh Election Commission redrew constituency boundaries to reflect population changes revealed by the 2001 Bangladesh census. The 2008 redistricting altered the boundaries of the constituency.

== Members of Parliament ==
Election	Member	Party
1973	Mir Abul Khayer	Awami League
1979	Anwar Uddin Shikdar	Bangladesh Nationalist Party
1986	Syed Abu Hossain Babla	Jatiya Party
1991	Salah Uddin Ahmed	Bangladesh Nationalist Party
Feb 1996	Salah Uddin Ahmed	Bangladesh Nationalist Party
Jun 1996	Habibur Rahman Mollah	Awami League
2001	Salah Uddin Ahmed	Bangladesh Nationalist Party
2008	Sanjida Khanam	Awami League
2014	Syed Abu Hossain Babla	Jatiya Party (Ershad)
2024	Awlad Hossain	Independent
2026	Syed Zainul Abedin	Bangladesh Jamaat-e-Islami

== Elections ==
=== Elections in the 2020s ===
General Election 2026: Dhaka-4
Party	Candidate	Votes	%	±%
Jamaat	Syed Zainul Abedin	77,367	47.7	N/A
BNP	Tanvir Ahmed	74,447	45.9	N/A
IAB	Syed Md. Mosaddeq Billah	6,518	4.0	N/A
Independent	Md. Mizanur Rahman	2,867	1.8	N/A
CPB	Md. Firoz Alam	367	0.2	N/A
Janotar Dol	Md. Abul Kalam Azad	191	0.1	N/A
BSD	Md. Zakir Hosen	184	0.1	N/A
BSM	Sahel Ahmed Shohel	128	0.1	N/A
Majority		2,920	1.8	N/A
Turnout		162,069	44.7	N/A
Registered electors		362,506		
Jamaat gain from Independent				

=== Elections in the 2010s ===
General Election 2014: Dhaka-4
Party	Candidate	Votes	%	±%
JP(E)	Sayed Abu Hossain	17,772	54.6	N/A
Independent	Awlad Hossain	14,787	45.4	N/A
Majority		2,985	9.2	−18.8
Turnout		32,559	14.2	−65.9
JP(E) gain from AL				

=== Elections in the 2000s ===
General Election 2008: Dhaka-4
Party	Candidate	Votes	%	±%
AL	Sanjida Khanam	97,828	60.6	+18.3
BNP	Abdul Hai	52,701	32.7	−19.3
IAB	Rashid Ahmad Ferdous	6,600	4.1	N/A
Independent	Md. Lutfar Rahman	1,551	1.0	N/A
Bangladesh Kalyan Party	Md. Shafiqur Rahman	1,480	0.9	N/A
NAP	Makbul Ahmed Mokter	576	0.4	N/A
BTF	Md. Motiur Rahman	204	0.1	N/A
BKA	Md. Abdul Malek	167	0.1	N/A
Gano Forum	Safar Ali	103	0.1	N/A
United Citizen Movement	Amir Khan	99	0.1	N/A
Jatiya Samajtantrik Dal-JSD	Md. Akhter Hossen Bhuiya	85	0.1	N/A
Majority		45,127	28.0	+18.3
Turnout		161,394	80.1	+20.5
AL gain from BNP				

General Election 2001: Dhaka-4
Party	Candidate	Votes	%	±%
BNP	Salah Uddin Ahmed	151,368	52.0	+14.7
AL	Habibur Rahman Mollah	123,002	42.3	−4.8
IJOF	Syed Abu Hossain Babla	15,413	5.3	N/A
CPB	Sahidullah Chowdhury	507	0.2	−0.1
JSD	Habibur Rahman Shawkat	295	0.1	N/A
Bangladesh People's Congress	M. A. Gafur	196	0.1	N/A
Jatiya Party (M)	Monir Hossain Komal	149	0.1	N/A
Samridhya Bangladesh Andolan	Md. Mizanur Rahman	60	0.0	N/A
Majority		28,366	9.7	−0.1
Turnout		290,990	59.6	−6.3
BNP gain from AL				

=== Elections in the 1990s ===
General Election June 1996: Dhaka-4
Party	Candidate	Votes	%	±%
AL	Habibur Rahman Mollah	102,939	47.1	N/A
BNP	Salah Uddin Ahmed	81,522	37.3	−10.6
JP(E)	Kazi Jafar Ahmed	18,317	8.4	+2.9
Jamaat	Shah Jalal	7,368	3.4	−1.8
IOJ	Rashid Ahmad Ferdous	4,719	2.2	+0.2
Zaker Party	Jahangir Alam Chowdhury	1,989	0.9	−1.5
CPB	Sahidullah Chowdhury	583	0.3	−35.8
BKA	Md. Jamal Uddin Mian	435	0.2	N/A
Independent	S. M. Mosharaf Hossain	269	0.1	N/A
Ganatantrik Sarbahara Party	Rafiqul Alam	133	0.1	N/A
Jatiya Daridra Party	Din Mohammed Bhuyan	94	0.0	N/A
NDP	Md. Abu Shaleh	86	0.0	−0.1
Jatiya Janata Party (Asad)	Md. Yusuf Ali	48	0.0	−0.1
Majority		21,417	9.8	−2.0
Turnout		218,502	65.9	+24.1
AL gain from BNP				

General Election 1991: Dhaka-4
Party	Candidate	Votes	%	±%
BNP	Salah Uddin Ahmed	56,362	47.9	
CPB	Saifuddin Ahmed Manik	42,454	36.1	
JP(E)	Md. Aamir Hossain	6,424	5.5	
Jamaat	Shah Jalal	6,106	5.2	
Zaker Party	Sharif Uddin Ahmed	2,803	2.4	
IOJ	M. A. Gafur	2,300	2.0	
Bangladesh Janata Party	S. M. Jamal Badshah	614	0.5	
Jatiya Biplobi Front	Abul Hossain	170	0.1	
NDP	M. A. Ahad	116	0.1	
Jatiyatabadi Gonotantrik Chashi Dal	Kazi Abdus Salam	95	0.1	
Independent	M. A. Gafur	93	0.1	
Jatiya Janata Party (Asad)	Makbul Ahmed	60	0.1	
Independent	Gazi Md. Delwar Hossain	59	0.1	
Independent	Habibur Rahman Mollah	58	0.0	
Majority		13,908	11.8	
Turnout		117,714	41.8	
BNP gain from JP(E)				
