= Tamanna =

Tamanna may refer to:

== Arts and entertainment ==
- Tamanna (1942 film), a Bollywood film
- Tamanna (1997 film), an Indian drama film by Mahesh Bhatt
- Tamanna (2014 film), a British-Pakistani film
- Tamanna House, an Indian thriller television series
- Tamanna (TV series), an Indian Hindi soap opera

== People ==
- Tamanna Begum (died 2012), Pakistani film actress
- Tamanna Nusrat Bubly (born 1984), Bangladeshi politician.
- Tamanna Vyas (born 1996), Indian actress
- Tamannaah Bhatia (born 1989), Indian actress
- Faramarz Tamanna (born 1977), Afghan academic and politician
- Tasnova Tamanna, Bangladeshi actress

== See also ==
- "Sarfaroshi Ki Tamanna", a patriotic Urdu poem by Indian freedom fighter Bismil Azimabadi
- Ek Tamanna Lahasil Si, a Pakistani drama serial
