= Chowdhury A. T. M. Masud =

Bangladeshi Judge

3rd Chief Election Commissioner of Bangladesh
- In office 17 February 1985 – 17 February 1990
- President: Hussain Muhammad Ershad
- Prime Minister: Ataur Rahman Khan; Mizanur Rahman Chowdhury; Moudud Ahmed; Kazi Zafar Ahmed
- Preceded by: A. K. M. Nurul Islam
- Succeeded by: Sultan Hossain Khan

Personal details
- Born: 1924 Sylhet, Bengal Presidency (present-day Bangladesh)
- Died: 23 November 2013 (aged 88–89) National Heart Foundation Hospital, Dhaka, Bangladesh
- Children: Salma Masud Chowdhury
- Education: University of Calcutta
- Profession: Judge

Chowdhury A. T. M. Masud was a Bangladeshi judge and Chief Election Commissioner of Bangladesh. He had also been the Chairperson of Bangladesh National Heart Foundation.

== Early life ==
Masud was born in Sylhet and was educated at the Department of Law, University of Calcutta. From 1945 to 1947, he was the President of All Assam Muslim Students' Federation and was involved in the 1947 Sylhet referendum. He was the office secretary of the Muslim League referendum board in Sylhet.

== Career ==
Masud started his law practice in 1951 in Sylhet, East Pakistan. By 1962, Masud was practicing law in the Supreme Court of Pakistan.

Masud was a judge of Bangladesh High Court in 1982. He was appointed the Chief Election Commissioner of Bangladesh on 17 February 1985 and remained in that position till 17 February 1990.

== Death and legacy ==
Masud died on 23 November 2013 at the National Heart Foundation Hospital in Dhaka, Bangladesh. His daughter, Salma Masud Chowdhury, is a Justice of Bangladesh High Court.

== Book ==
He wrote a non-fiction book titled:

Reminiscence of Few Decades and Problems of Democracy in Bangladesh.
