= Mohammad Kamal Hossain =

Bangladeshi politician

- মোহাম্মদ কামাল হোসেন

Member of Parliament
- Incumbent
- Assumed office 17 February 2026
- Preceded by: Moshiur Rahman Mollah
- Constituency: Dhaka-5

Personal details
- Born: 5 June 1976 (age 50) Suchipara, Shahrasti, Chandpur, Bangladesh
- Party: Bangladesh Jamaat-e-Islami
- Occupation: Politician, business

Mohammad Kamal Hossain is a Bangladeshi politician and a Jatiya Sangsad member-elect representing the Dhaka-5 constituency.

Hossain is an assistant secretary of Bangladesh Jamaat-e-Islami Dhaka City South.

Hossain won the 2026 Bangladeshi general election contesting at the Dhaka-5 constituency securing 96,641 votes while his nearest opponent Bangladesh Nationalist Party candidate Nabiullah Nabi received 87,491 votes.

== Early life ==
Mohammad Kamal Hossain was born in 1976 in Chandpur village, Shahrasti Upazila of Chandpur district, into a respected Muslim family. His father, the late Mawlana Abul Khayer, was a renowned Islamic scholar, teacher, imam, and social worker. His mother was a homemaker and the mother of eleven children.

In his personal life, he is married and the father of three children.

== Education ==
From his early primary and secondary education, he demonstrated academic excellence. He later completed his Honours and master's degrees in statistics from Jagannath University and earned an MBA from BIU. During his student life, he gained recognition as a distinguished debater.

== Political career ==
Mohammad Kamal Hossain began his organizational and political journey through his involvement with Bangladesh Islami Chhatra Shibir. Within the organization, he held several important positions, including President of Khilgaon Thana, President of Dhaka City East, and Member of the Central Executive Council.

After completing his student life, he started his professional career as an official at Bangladesh Islami University. Later, in order to become more actively involved in politics and social welfare, he left his job and engaged in social service and business activities.

In 2007, he joined Bangladesh Jamaat-e-Islami. He served as the Ameer of Motijheel Thana from 2012 to 2018. At present, he is serving as a member of the Central Majlish-e-Shura and as the Assistant Secretary of Dhaka City South. Between 2011 and 2024, he was reportedly arrested nine times and spent a total of 853 days in prison in connection with more than fifty cases. It is also stated that his family and business establishments faced repeated incidents of harassment, legal cases, and attacks.
