= Syed Zainul Abedin (politician) =

Bangladeshi politician

- সৈয়দ জয়নুল আবেদীন
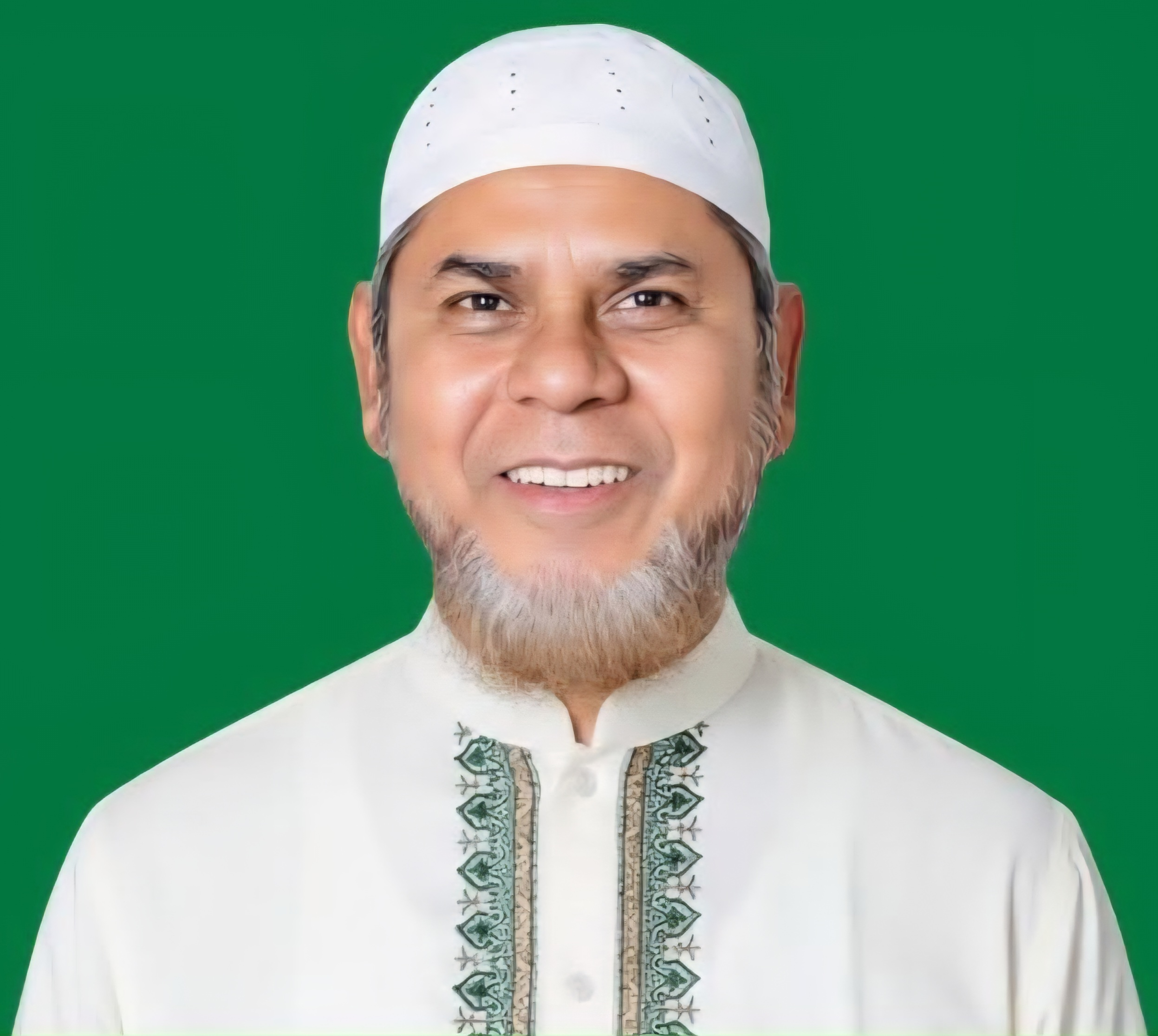

Member of the Bangladesh Parliament for Dhaka-4
- Incumbent
- Assumed office 17 February 2026
- Preceded by: Awlad Hossain

Personal details
- Born: 1 March 1971 (age 55) Bakerganj Upazila, Barishal District
- Party: Bangladesh Jamaat-e-Islami

Syed Zainul Abedin is a Bangladeshi politician of the Bangladesh Jamaat-e-Islami. He is currently serving as a member of parliament from Dhaka-4 .

== Early life ==
Abedin was born on 1 March in 1971 at Bakerganj Upazila under Barishal District.
