= Jangipur =

Jangipur may refer to:

== In Uttar Pradesh ==
- Jangipur, Ghazipur, a town in Ghazipur district, Uttar Pradesh
- Jangipur, Jaunpur, a village in Jaunpur district, Uttar Pradesh
- Jangipur, Uttar Pradesh Assembly constituency, a constituency of Uttar Pradesh Legislative Assembly

== In West Bengal ==
- Jangipur district, a proposed district to be created in Malda division, West Bengal
- Jangipur subdivision, an administrative subdivision in Murshidabad district, West Bengal
- Jangipur, Murshidabad, a town in Murshidabad district, West Bengal
- Jangipur police district, a police district in Murshidabad district, West Bengal
- Jangipur, West Bengal Assembly constituency, a constituency of West Bengal Legislative Assembly

== See also ==
- Jahangirpur (disambiguation)
