= Jahangir Khan (disambiguation) =

Jahangir Khan (born 1963) is a Pakistani squash player.

Jahangir Khan may also refer to:

- Mirza Jahangir Khan (1875–1908), Iranian journalist and politician
- Jahangir Khan (cricketer) (1910–1988), played cricket for India during British rule
- A. K. Mohammad Jahangir Khan (1939–2020), Bangladeshi film producer
- Jahangir Alam Khan (born 1952), Bangladeshi agricultural economist and researcher
- Jehangir Khan, footballer
- Jahangir Khan (footballer) (born 2000), Hong Kong football midfielder
- Jahangir Khan, antagonist of the 2003 Indian film Maqbool, based on King Duncan from Macbeth

== See also ==
- Jahangir (name)
- Cihangir (disambiguation)
