= A. K. M. Rahmatullah =

Bangladeshi politician (1950–2026)

- এ. কে. এম. রহমতুল্লাহ্

Member of Parliament for Dhaka-11
- In office 29 January 2014 – 7 January 2024
- Preceded by: Asaduzzaman Khan

Member of Parliament for Dhaka-10
- In office 29 January 2009 – 28 January 2014
- Preceded by: Mohammad Mosaddak Ali
- Succeeded by: Sheikh Fazle Noor Taposh

Member of Parliament for Dhaka-5
- In office 14 July 1996 – 13 July 2001
- Preceded by: Shah Moazzem Hossain
- Succeeded by: Mohammad Siraj Uddin Ahmed
- In office 10 July 1986 – 6 December 1987
- Preceded by: Mohammad Quamrul Islam
- Succeeded by: Habibur Rahman Mollah

Personal details
- Born: 4 December 1950
- Died: 3 June 2026 (aged 75) Dhaka, Bangladesh
- Party: Bangladesh Awami League

A. K. M. Rahmatullah (4 December 1950 – 3 June 2026) was a Bangladesh Awami League politician who was a Jatiya Sangsad member, representing the Dhaka-11 constituency. He also previously represented Dhaka-5 and Dhaka-10.

== Life and career ==
Rahmatullah was born on 4 December 1950. He was elected to parliament from Dhaka-11 in 2014 as a Bangladesh Awami League candidate. On 10 April 2016, he was appointed the president of South Dhaka unit of the party.

In April 2018, a gunfight between Rahmatullah's supporters and those of Beraid Union Parishad Chairman Jahangir Alam killed one person.

In January 2023, Rahmatullah disclosed that he had been a follower of Ahl-i Hadith organization of Sunni Muslims.

On 26 November 2023, Awami League announced the final list of its 298 candidates to contest the 2024 national election which did not include Rahmatullah.

Rahmatullah died on 3 June 2026, at the age of 75.
