= Moslem Uddin Khan =

Bangladeshi politician

Member of Parliament for Dhaka-2
- In office 1973–1979
- Preceded by: Position created
- Succeeded by: Abdul Mannan

Personal details
- Born: 1930; Manikganj, Bengal Presidency, British India
- Died: 21 November 2013 (aged 82–83); Dhaka, Bangladesh
- Political party: Bangladesh Awami League

Moslem Uddin Khan (1930 – 21 November 2013) was a Bangladesh Awami League politician and a Jatiya Sangsad member representing the Dhaka-2 constituency.

== Career ==
Khan was elected to parliament from Dhaka-2 as a Bangladesh Awami League candidate in 1973. He died on 21 November 2013 in Dhaka.
