= Anwar Uddin Shikdar =

Bangladeshi politician

Member of Bangladesh Parliament
- In office 1979–1982
- Preceded by: Mir Abul Khayer
- Succeeded by: Syed Abu Hossain Babla

Personal details
- Political party: Bangladesh Nationalist Party

Anwar Uddin Shikdar is a Bangladesh Nationalist Party politician and a former member of parliament of Dhaka-4.

== Career ==
Shikdar was elected to parliament from Dhaka-4 as a Bangladesh Nationalist Party candidate in 1979.
