= Dhaka-2 =

Bangladeshi parliamentary constituency

Coordinates: 23.70°N 90.34°E

- Constituency for the Jatiya Sangsad
- District: Dhaka District
- Division: Dhaka Division
- Electorate: 419,215 (2026)

Current constituency
- Created: 1973
- Party: Bangladesh Nationalist Party
- Member: Amanullah Aman
- ← 174 Dhaka-1 176 Dhaka-3 →

Dhaka-2 is a constituency represented in the Jatiya Sangsad (National Parliament) of Bangladesh since 2026 by Amanullah Aman of the Bangladesh Nationalist Party.

== Boundaries ==
The constituency encompasses Dhaka South City Corporation wards 55 through 57; one union parishad of Kamrangirchar and Hazaribagh thanas: Sultanganj; seven union parishads of Keraniganj Upazila: Basta, Hazratpur, Kalatia, Kalindi, Ruhitpur, Sakta, and Taranagar; and three union parishads of Savar Upazila: Amin Bazar, Bhakurta, and Tetuljhora.

== History ==
The constituency was created for the first general elections in newly independent Bangladesh, held in 1973.

Ahead of the 2008 general election, the Bangladesh Election Commission redrew constituency boundaries to reflect population changes revealed by the 2001 Bangladesh census. The 2008 redistricting altered the boundaries of the constituency.

== Members of Parliament ==
Election	Member	Party
1973	Moslem Uddin Khan	Awami League
1979	Abdul Halim Chowdhury	Bangladesh Nationalist Party
1986	Burhan Uddin Khan	Awami League
1988	Burhan Uddin Khan	Jatiya Party
1991	Abdul Mannan	Bangladesh Nationalist Party
Feb 1996	Abdul Mannan	Bangladesh Nationalist Party
Jun 1996	Abdul Mannan	Bangladesh Nationalist Party
2008	Qamrul Islam	Awami League
2026	Amanullah Aman	Bangladesh Nationalist Party

== Elections ==
=== Elections in the 2020s ===
General Election 2026: Dhaka-2
Party	Candidate	Votes	%	±%
BNP	Amanullah Aman	163,793	65.5	N/A
Jamaat	Md. Abdul Haq	80,053	32.0	N/A
IAB	Md. Johirul Islam	6,352	2.5	N/A
Majority		83,740	33.5	N/A
Turnout		250,198	59.7	N/A
Registered electors		419,215		
BNP gain from AL				

=== Elections in the 2010s ===
Qamrul Islam was re-elected unopposed in the 2014 general election after opposition parties withdrew their candidacies in a boycott of the election.

=== Elections in the 2000s ===
General Election 2008: Dhaka-2
Party	Candidate	Votes	%	±%
AL	Qamrul Islam	180,172	57.0	+8.3
BNP	Md. Matiur Rahman	124,600	39.4	−11.1
IAB	Ruhul Amin	4,831	1.5	N/A
BTF	Syed Nazibul Bashar Maizvandary	2,017	0.6	N/A
Zaker Party	Md. Josim Uddin	1,971	0.6	N/A
BKA	Md. Habibullah	1,787	0.6	N/A
BDB	Fazlul Haque	352	0.1	N/A
Gano Front	Hammed Ali Sheikh	248	0.1	N/A
Bangladesh Kalyan Party	Md. Mubinul Haque	187	0.1	N/A
Majority		55,572	17.6	+15.8
Turnout		316,165	83.6	+5.1
AL gain from BNP				

General Election 2001: Dhaka-2
Party	Candidate	Votes	%	±%
BNP	Abdul Mannan	70,958	50.5	+3.5
AL	Mohammad Noor Ali	68,414	48.7	+17.0
IJOF	M. R. Haroon	906	0.6	N/A
Jatiya Party (M)	Matiur Rahman	211	0.2	N/A
Majority		2,544	1.8	−13.4
Turnout		140,489	78.5	−1.1
BNP hold				

=== Elections in the 1990s ===
General Election June 1996: Dhaka-2
Party	Candidate	Votes	%	±%
BNP	Abdul Mannan	50,818	47.0	+5.2
AL	A. Baten Mian	34,344	31.7	N/A
JP(E)	A. K. M. Abdul Halim	20,492	18.9	+4.6
Jamaat	Minhaz Uddin	1,565	1.4	N/A
Zaker Party	Md. Kazi Ferdous	503	0.5	−1.9
WPB	Khandokar Ali Abbas	221	0.2	N/A
Gano Forum	Nur Mohammed Sharifi	153	0.1	N/A
Independent	Sudhir Kumar Hazra	62	0.1	N/A
Independent	Dewan Kamal Anwar	26	0.0	N/A
Majority		16,474	15.2	+5.6
Turnout		108,184	79.6	+22.2
BNP hold				

General Election 1991: Dhaka-2
Party	Candidate	Votes	%	±%
BNP	Abdul Mannan	37,415	41.8	
BAKSAL	Azizur Rahman	28,820	32.2	
JP(E)	Sudhir Kumar Hazra	12,778	14.3	
UCL	Siraj Uddin Ahmed	7,284	8.1	
Zaker Party	Arshed Gazi	2,135	2.4	
Independent	Dewan Mintu	429	0.5	
Bangladesh Jatiya Tanti Dal	Siraj Uddin	302	0.3	
Jatiya Samajtantrik Dal-JSD	Nazirul Islam	182	0.2	
Independent	Abu Md. Subid Ali	61	0.1	
Majority		8,595	9.6	
Turnout		89,406	57.4	
BNP gain from AL				
