= Burhan Uddin Khan =

Bangladeshi politician

Member of Parliament for Dhaka-2
- In office 10 July 1986 – 6 December 1990
- Preceded by: Abdul Halim Chowdhury
- Succeeded by: Abdul Mannan

Personal details
- Party: Bangladesh Awami League

Burhan Uddin Khan (died 9 October 2018) was a Bangladesh Awami League politician and a former Jatiya Sangsad member representing the Dhaka-2 constituency.

== Career ==
Khan was elected to parliament from Dhaka-2 as a Bangladesh Awami League candidate in 1986 and 1988. Khan died on 9 October 2018.
