= Abdul Malik (physician) =

Bangladeshi cardiologist and national professor

- আবদুল মালিক
- Born: 1 December 1929; South Surma, Assam Province, British India
- Died: 5 December 2023 (aged 94); Dhaka, Bangladesh
- Education: MC College; Dhaka Medical College; Royal College of Physicians
- Years active: 1954–2023
- Spouse: Ashrafunnisa Khatun
- Children: 3
- Medical career
- Profession: Cardiologist
- Institutions: Dhaka Medical College; Hammersmith Hospital; BSMMU; World Health Organization; Government of Bangladesh
- Sub-specialties: Cardiology
- Awards: Independence Day Award; National Professor
- Military career
- Allegiance: Pakistan (before 1971); Bangladesh
- Branch: Pakistan Army; Bangladesh Army
- Service years: 1955 - 1990
- Rank: Brigadier General
- Unit: Army Medical Corps
- Commands: Commandant of CMH, Comilla; CO of 15th Field Ambulance
- Conflicts: Indo-Pakistani War of 1965

Abdul Malik (1 December 1929 – 5 December 2023) was a Bangladeshi cardiologist and National Professor of Bangladesh. He was the first cardiac surgeon in united Pakistan. He was the founder of the National Heart Foundation of Bangladesh. In 2004, he was awarded the Independence Day Award, the highest state award by the government of Bangladesh for his contribution to medical science.

== Early life and education ==
Abdul Malik was born on 1 December 1929 in the present-day Dakshin Surma Upazila area of Sylhet district in the then British India to Moulavi Furqan Ali and Syeda Nurunniea Khatun. He earned his MBBS degree from Dhaka Medical College in 1954. He then joined the Pakistan Army Medical Corps in June 1955. He was then trained in the United Kingdom.

== Career ==
In 1966, Malik set up a cardiac unit at Military Hospital Rawalpindi, Pakistan.

The first open heart surgery in Pakistan was performed in March 1970 in this cardiac unit. For this achievement, he was awarded nationally and was promoted to lieutenant colonel. He joined the Institute of Post Graduate Medicine and Research, Dhaka (now Bangabandhu Sheikh Mujib Medical University) in June 1970, and established a cardiac unit there. He served as professor of cardiology there from 1970 to 1978.

In 1978, Abdul Malik founded the National Institute of Cardiovascular Diseases, Dhaka, where he worked as a professor until 1989. The first open heart surgery in Bangladesh was done on 18 September 1981 in this institution.

In 1978, Abdul Malik founded the National Heart Foundation of Bangladesh. He served as the president and advisor of the foundation.

Malik was the founder president of the Bangladesh Cardiac Society from 1980 to 2005, SAARC Cardiac Society, and a member of the Expert Panel Committee of World Health Organization (WHO) on cardiovascular disease during 1976–2000.

Malik was a Fellow of the Royal College of Physicians of Edinburgh, Bangladesh College of Physicians and Surgeons, American College of Cardiology, and American College of Chest Physicians.

== Personal life and death ==
Malik was married to Ashrafunnesa Khatun, a social worker. Together they had one daughter, Fazilatunnesa, a professor of cardiology and senior chief consultant at the National Heart Foundation Hospital and Research Institute in Dhaka, and two sons, Masud Malik, an industrialist, and Manzur Malik, a researcher working in Canada.

Abdul Malik died in Dhaka on 5 December 2023, at the age of 94.

== Awards ==
- Independence Day Award 2004, highest state award by the government of Bangladesh (for contribution in health education and medical science)
- National Professor, 2006, by the government of Bangladesh (for contribution in health education and medical science)
- Sandoz Gold Award, 2008, by Novartis Bangladesh
