= Kazi Monirul Islam Manu =

Bangladeshi politician

Kazi Monirul Islam
- কাজী মনিরুল ইসলাম

Member of Parliament for Dhaka-5
- In office 17 Oct 2020 – 7 January 2024
- Preceded by: Habibur Rahman Mollah
- Succeeded by: Moshiur Rahman Mollah

Personal details
- Born: 2 January 1952 (age 74)
- Party: Bangladesh Awami League

Kazi Monirul Islam (born 2 January 1952) is a Bangladesh Awami League politician and former Jatiya Sangsad member representing the Dhaka-5 constituency.

== Career ==
Islam is the president of Jatrabari Thana Awami League. After the death of Habibur Rahman Mollah on 6 May 2020, he was elected as a Jatiya Sangsad member of the vacant seat in the by-election held on 17 October 2020.

After the fall of the Sheikh Hasina led Awami League government, Islam was detained by Detective Branch from Gulshan.
