= Mohammad Quamrul Islam =

Bangladeshi politician

- মোহাম্মদ কামরুল ইসলাম

State Minister for Expatriate Welfare and Overseas Employment
- In office 10 October 2001 – 9 July 2006
- Succeeded by: Lutfor Rahman Khan Azad

State Minister for Shipping
- In office 9 July 2006 – 29 October 2006
- Preceded by: Mofazzal Hossain Chowdhury

Member of the Bangladesh Parliament for Dhaka-5
- In office 28 October 2001 – 27 October 2006
- Preceded by: A. K. M. Rahmatullah
- Succeeded by: Habibur Rahman Mollah
- In office September 1991 – June 1996
- Preceded by: Mohammad Siraj Uddin Ahmed
- Succeeded by: A. K. M. Rahmatullah

Personal details
- Party: Bangladesh Nationalist Party

Military service
- Allegiance: Bangladesh
- Branch/service: Bangladesh Army
- Years of service: 1975-1988
- Rank: Major
- Unit: East Bengal Regiment
- Commands: 2IC of 26th East Bengal Regiment; BM of 309th Infantry Brigade

Major (Retd.) Mohammad Quamrul Islam is a Bangladesh Nationalist Party politician and a former Jatiya Sangsad member representing the Dhaka-5 constituency in the 5th, 6th, and 8th parliaments. He is also a former state minister for expatriate welfare and overseas employment ministry, and also shipping ministry in the third Khaleda Zia cabinet.

== Career ==
Islam served in the Bangladesh Army and retired with the rank of major.

During the 2007-2008 caretaker government, Islam confessed to corruption to the Truth and Accountability Commission.
