= Moshiur Rahman Mollah =

Bangladeshi politician

Moshiur Rahman Mollah Shajal

Member of the Bangladesh Parliament for Dhaka-5
- In office 30 January 2024 – 6 August 2024
- Preceded by: Kazi Monirul Islam Manu

Personal details
- Born: 24 March 1963 (age 63)
- Party: Bangladesh Awami League
- Parent: Habibur Rahman Mollah (father)

Moshiur Rahman Mollah Shajal (born 24 March 1963) is a Bangladesh Awami League politician and a former Jatiya Sangsad member representing the Dhaka-5 constituency. He is a son of former MP Habibur Rahman Mollah.
