= Ashish Ranjan Das =

Bangladeshi judge

The Honourable Ashish Ranjan Das
- আশিস রঞ্জন দাশ

Justice of the High Court Division of Bangladesh
- Incumbent
- Assumed office 14 June 2012

Personal details
- Born: 29 January 1958 (age 68)
- Education: University of Dhaka
- Profession: Judge

Ashish Ranjan Das (born 29 January 1958) is a Bangladeshi judge of the High Court Division. He was appointed in 2012.

== Early life ==
Das was born on 29 January 1958. He completed bachelors and masters of law from the University of Dhaka.

== Career ==
Das was appointed a judge in the District Munsiff Court on 20 April 1983.

On 24 February 2000, Das through promotion became a District and Session Court Judge.

In September 2007, Das sent one man to seven years imprisonment for throwing acid on a woman and her child.

In July 2008, Das was the Satkhira District and sessions judge. In July 2008, he sent the Officer in Charge of Patkelghata police station, Kazi Mizanur Rahman, to jail on charges of killing his wife.

On 14 June 2012, Das was appointed an additional judge of the High Court Division of Bangladesh Supreme Court. He had been serving as the secretary to the Law and Justice Division under the Ministry of Law, Justice and Parliamentary Affairs. On 1 November 2012, Das and Justice Salma Masud Chowdhury summoned the Officer in Charge of Kachua Police Station, Md Monjur for failing to prevent the extrajudicial punishment, canning of a woman under sharia law, in his area by a village arbitration committee. He and Justice Salma Masud Chowdhury also summoned the Officer in Charge of Ujirpur Police Station, Liton Pandey, for failure to prevent an attack on a school headmaster.

On 9 June 2014, Das was made a permanent judge of the High Court Division.

Das and Justice Moyeenul Islam Chowdhury in 2017 issued a verdict declaring certain sections of Mobile Court Act 2009 illegal. The verdict was appealed by Motahar Hossain Sazu, the Deputy Attorney General of Bangladesh.

On 18 October 2016, Das and Justice M Enayetur Rahim ordered the transfer of Mohammad Rafiqul Islam, Upazila Nirbahi Officer of Sakhipur Upazila, and Mohammad Maksudul Alam, Officer in Charge of Sakhipur Police Station outside of Dhaka Division. They passed the order to ensure a fair investigation into the two for sending an 8th grade student to two years imprisonment. The order was later stayed by Justice Hasan Foez Siddique of the Appellate Division of Bangladesh Supreme Court.
