= Chandur, Maharashtra =

Chandur Railway
- city
- Location in Maharashtra, India
- Coordinates: 20.8142°N 78.1667°E
- Country: India
- State: Maharashtra
- District: Amravati
- Elevation: 332 m (1,089 ft)

Population (2011)
  - Total: 19,776

Languages
  - Official: Marathi
- Time zone: UTC+5:30 (IST)
- PIN: 444904
- Telephone code: 07222
- Vehicle registration: MH-27

Chandur Railway is a city and a municipal council in Amravati district in the state of Maharashtra, India. Chandur Railway is one of the three talukas (the other two are the Dhamangaon and the Nandgaon Khandeshwar) of Chandur Railway subdivision in Amravati district.

== Geography ==
Chandur Railway is located at 20.8142° N, 77.9767° E . It has an average elevation of 332 metres (1089 feet).

== Demographics ==
As of 2011 India census, Chandur Railway has a population of 19,776 people. Males constitute 52% of the population while females constitute 48% of the population. Chandur Railway has an average literacy rate of 77%, higher than the national average of 59.5%, with male literacy of 82% and female literacy of 72%. 12% of the population is under 6 years of age.

Year	Male	Female	Total Population	Change	Religion (%)							
Year	Male	Female	Total Population	Change	Hindu	Muslim	Christian	Sikhs	Buddhist	Jain	Other religions and persuasions	Religion not stated
2001	9134	8585	17719	-	79.164	8.719	0.119	0.073	9.301	2.359	0.085	0.181
2011	9982	9794	19776	11.609	76.699	11.671	0.101	0.020	9.441	1.780	0.187	0.101

== Villages ==
Amdori, Amla Vishveshwar, Ashrafpur, Bagapur, Baggi, Baslapur, Bhiltek, Bori, Budhali, Chandur Kheda, Chandur Wadi, Chirodi, Dahigaon, Danapur, Dhanapur, Dhanodi, Dhanora Mhali, Dhanora Mogal, Dhotra, Dighi Kolhe, Dilawarpur, Eklara, Ekpala, Gaurkheda, Ghuikhed, Ibrahimpur, Ismailpur, Jahagirpur, Jalka Jagtap, Jawala, Jawra, Kalamgaon, Kalamjapur, Karala, Kawtha Kadu, Khanapur, Kharbi Mandavgad, Kirjawala, Kodori Harak, Kohla, Lalkhed, Malkhed, Mandwa, Manjarkhed, Manjarkhed, Mogra, Murtizapur, Neknampur, Nimbha, Nimgavhan, Nimla, Palaskhed, Pathargaon, Rajana, Rajura (Bhiltek), Salora Kh., Sangulwada, Satefal, Sawanga Bk., Sawanga Vithoba, Sawangi Magrapur, Sawangi Sangam, Shirajgaon Korde, Shivni, Songaon, Sonora Bk., Sonora Kh., Supalwada, Taroda, Tembhurni, Thugaon, Titwa, Tongalabad, Tuljapur, Umarpur, Wai, Yerad.

== Connectivity ==
Chandur railway city is situated at Mumbai - howrah railway line at nagpur division of central railway. CND is the code of railway station. badnera junction is 30 km away from city. Chandur railway connecting the wardha and Amravati by state highway. Nearest city form chandur is Dhamangaon at 18 km. there is huge amount of road transport for major cities in Maharashtra.
