= Mostafa Mohsin Montu =

Bangladeshi politician (1945–2025)

- মোস্তফা মোহসীন মন্টু
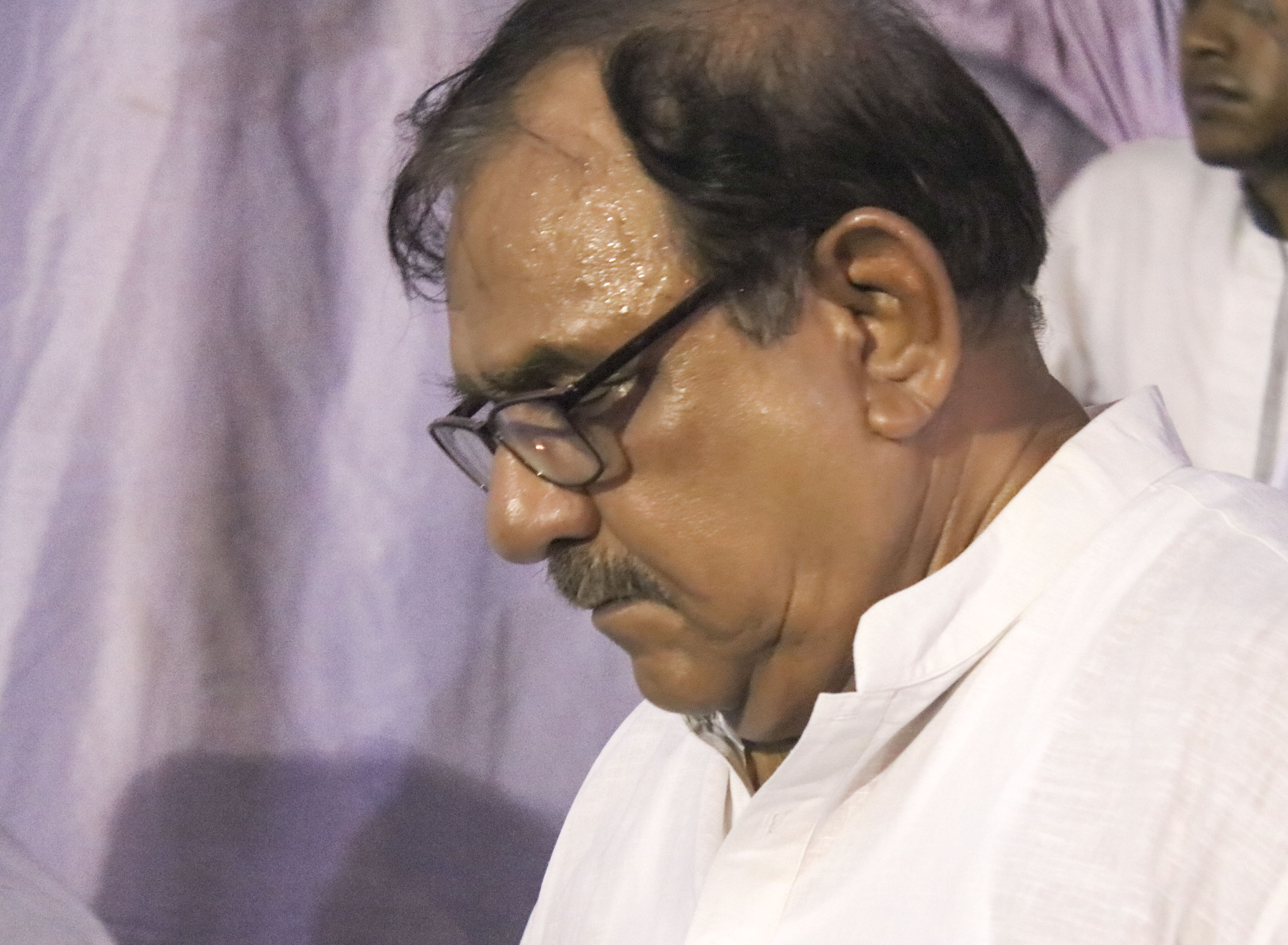
- Montu in 2018

President and Secretary-General, Gano Forum (splinter fraction)
- In office 2009–2025

Member of Parliament for Dhaka-3
- In office 7 May 1986 – 3 March 1988
- Preceded by: Nizam Uddin Khan
- Succeeded by: Md. Saifur Rahman

Personal details
- Born: 2 February 1945; Dhanmondi, Dhaka, Bengal Province, British India
- Died: 15 June 2025 (aged 80); Dhaka, Bangladesh
- Political party: Bangladesh Awami League Gano Forum
- Occupation: Politician

Mostafa Mohsin Montu (2 February 1945 – 15 June 2025) was a Bangladeshi politician and member of parliament. He was the president and general secretary of Gano Forum splinter fraction.

== Early life ==
Montu was born on 2 February 1945 at Dhanmondi in Dhaka of the then British Raj to Mir Jahan and Rahela Khatun.

== Career ==
Montu was involved in Bangladesh Awami League politics from his student life. Later, he was elected president of Jubo League, youth wing of the Awami League. He was the secretary of Awami League's Dhaka City branch. He was expelled from Awami League in 1992 and joined Kamal Hossain's Gano Forum. In 2009, he was elected secretary general of Gano Forum.

Montu was elected a member of parliament from the Dhaka-3 constituency as an Awami League candidate during the third parliamentary election in 1986. In the fifth parliamentary elections in 1991, he contested again from Dhaka-3 under Awami League banner, but he was defeated by the BNP's Amanullah Aman.

== Death ==
Mostafa died on 15 June 2025, at the age of 80.
