= Salah Uddin Ahmed =

Bangladeshi politician

- সালাহ উদ্দিন আহমেদ

Member of the Bangladesh Parliament for Dhaka-4
- In office 5 March 1991 – 30 March 1996
- Preceded by: Syed Abu Hossain Babla
- Succeeded by: Habibur Rahman Mollah
- In office 28 October 2001 – 27 October 2006
- Succeeded by: Sanjida Khanam

Personal details
- Died: 13 October 2026 Dhaka, Bangladesh
- Party: Bangladesh Nationalist Party
- Children: 1

Salah Uddin Ahmed (died 13 October 2026) was a Bangladesh Nationalist Party politician who was a Jatiya Sangsad member representing the Dhaka-4 constituency from 1991 to 1996 and 2001 to 2006.

== Career ==
Ahmed was elected to parliament from Dhaka-4 as a Bangladesh Nationalist Party candidate three times in 1991, 1996 and 2001. He also served as BNP's secretary for commerce affairs. In 2018, he was nominated by the Bangladesh Nationalist Party for Dhaka-4 constituency. He was attacked and injured in the polling station when he went to vote.

In August 2015, the Wari police station filed a chargesheet against 34 people, including Ahmed, alleging the group set a passenger bus on fire by a petrol bomb and vandalized some vehicles in front of the Gulistan Toll Plaza of Mayor Hanif Flyover in January 2015. Ahmed had become fugitive since then. Upon his surrender to court in February 2021, he was denied bail and then sent to jail.

== Death ==
Ahmed died at a hospital in Dhaka, on 13 October 2026.
