= Jatrabari Thana =

Thana in Dhaka South City Corporation, Bangladesh

Jatrabari Thana যাত্রাবাড়ী থানা
- Neighborhood and Thana
- Interactive map of Jatrabari Thana
- Coordinates: 23.7105°N 90.4355°E
- Country: Bangladesh
- Division: Dhaka Division
- District: Dhaka District
- Established as Thana: 2007

Area
  - Total: 13.19 km^{2} (5.09 sq mi)
- Elevation: 23 m (75 ft)

Population (2022)
  - Total: 492,166
  - Density: 33,632/km^{2} (87,110/sq mi)
- Time zone: UTC+6 (BST)
- Postal code: 1236
- Area code: 02

Jatrabari Thana (Bengali: যাত্রাবাড়ী থানা) is a Metropolitan thana and Neighbourhood within the megacity of Dhaka in central Bangladesh. It is known for its steel furniture industry.

== Administration ==
Jatrabari Thana consists of parts of Matuail and Ward 87 in addition to Ward 84, Ward 85 and Ward 86 of Dhaka South City Corporation. It contains 17 mouzas and mahallas.

== Geography ==
(Dhaka metropolitan; Postal code: 1204) area 13.19 square kilometres (5.09 sq mi), located in between 23°42' and 23°43' north latitudes and in between 90°20' and 90°22' east longitudes, at the starting point of Dhaka-Chittagong Highway. It is bounded by Sabujbagh and Demra thanas on the north, Kadamtali and Shyampur thanas on the south, Demra thana on the east, Gandaria and Sutrapur thanas on the west.

== Demographics ==
Religions in Jatrabari Thana (2022)
Religion	Percent
Islam	97.47%
Hinduism	2.42%
Other or not stated	0.11%

According to the 2022 Bangladeshi census, Jatrabari Thana had 125,517 households and a population of 492,180. 8.10% of the

population were under 5 years of age. Jatrabari had a literacy rate (age 7 and over) of 83.91%: 84.75% for males and 82.89% for females, and a sex ratio of 119.99 males for every 100 females.

According to the 2011 Census of Bangladesh, Jatrabari Thana had 96,453 households with an average household size of 4.29 and a population of 443,601. Males constituted 55.27% (245,176) of the population, while females constituted 44.73% (198,425). Jatrabari had a literacy rate (age 7 and over) of 72.0%, compared to the national average of 51.8%, and a sex ratio of 124. There were 965 floating people in this jurisdiction.

The religious breakdown was Muslim 97.17% (431,037), Hindu 2.68% (11,891), Christian 0.14% (612), Buddhist 0.01% (37), and others 0.01% (24). The ethnic minority people living there were 102 persons in total.

== Education ==
Jatrabari thana is famous for educational institutions like A. K. High School and College, Jatrabari Ideal School and College, Dania College, and Dr. Mahbubur Rahman Mollah College. There is also the Jamia Muhammadia Arabia, which is in northern Jatrabari and is one of the largest Ahl-i Hadith madrasa in the country.

== Facilities ==
There are numerous mosques in Jatrabari Thana, most notably Babar Mosque, Dhalpur Zakarin Jame Mosque, Baytul Aman, Dhalpur Narikel Bagan Jame Mosque.
