= Md. Saifur Rahman =

Bangladeshi politician

Member of Bangladesh Parliament
- In office 1988–1991
- Preceded by: Mostafa Mohsin Montu
- Succeeded by: Amanullah Aman

Personal details
- Born: 4 December 1951 (age 74) keraniganj
- Died: 19 November 2006 Dhaka Bangladesh
- Resting place: Banani Graveyard_Dhaka, Bangladesh.
- Party: Jatiya Party (Ershad)

Md. Saifur Rahman is a Well-known Bangladeshi politician for the Jatiya Party (Ershad), a former Member of Parliament and District Council Chairman in the Dhaka-3 constituency.

== Career ==
Rahman was elected to parliament from Dhaka-3 as a Jatiya Party candidate in 1988.
