= Mohammad Siraj Uddin Ahmed =

Bangladeshi politician

- সিরাজ উদ্দিন আহমেদ

Member of Parliament for Dhaka-5
- In office 3 March 1988 – 6 December 1990
- Preceded by: Mohamed Rahmat Ullah
- Succeeded by: Mohammad Quamrul Islam

Personal details
- Party: Independent member of parliament

Mohammad Siraj Uddin Ahmed was a Bangladeshi Independent politician and a former member of parliament for Dhaka-5.

== Career ==
Siraj Uddin Ahmed was elected a member of parliament from the Dhaka-5 constituency as an independent candidate in the 1988 Bangladeshi general election. After that he joined the Jatiya Party. He was defeated as an independent candidate in the fifth parliamentary elections of 1991.
