= Khodeza Nasreen Akhter Hossain =

Bangladeshi politician

- খোদেজা নাসরিন আক্তার হোসেন

Member of the Bangladesh Parliament for Reserved Women's Seat-40
- In office 30 January 2019 – 29 January 2024
- Preceded by: Lutfa Taher
- Succeeded by: Sanjida Khanam

Personal details
- Born: October 2, 1968 (age 56)
- Political party: Bangladesh Awami League
- Spouse: Kazi Rezaul Hossain
- Education: L.L.B, L.L.M
- Occupation: Lawyer

Khodeza Nasreen Akhter Hossain is a Bangladesh Awami League politician and a member of the Bangladesh Parliament from a reserved seat.

== Career ==
Hossain was burned after the bus she was in was attacked by Bangladesh Nationalist Party activists during a strike in 2013.

Hossain was elected to parliament from reserved seat as a Bangladesh Awami League candidate in 2019. She is a member of the parliamentary caucus on child rights.
