= Cihangir (disambiguation) =

Cihangir is a neighborhood in the Beyoğlu district in Istanbul, Turkey.

Cihangir is also the Turkish form of the Persian name Jahangir, meaning "conqueror of the world". It may refer to:

- Şehzade Cihangir (1531–1553), Ottoman prince, son of Suleiman the Magnificent, and the namesake of the neighborhood
- Cihangir Akşit (born 1953), Turkish military officer and Director of the NATO Standardization Agency
- Cihangirzade İbrahim Bey (1874–1948), Turkish military officer, statesman, and administrator
- Epicho, a village in Northern Cyprus better known by its Turkish name Cihangir

== See also ==
- Jahangir (disambiguation)
