= Nasrul Hamid =

Bangladeshi Politician, State Minister

- নসরুল হামিদ বিপু
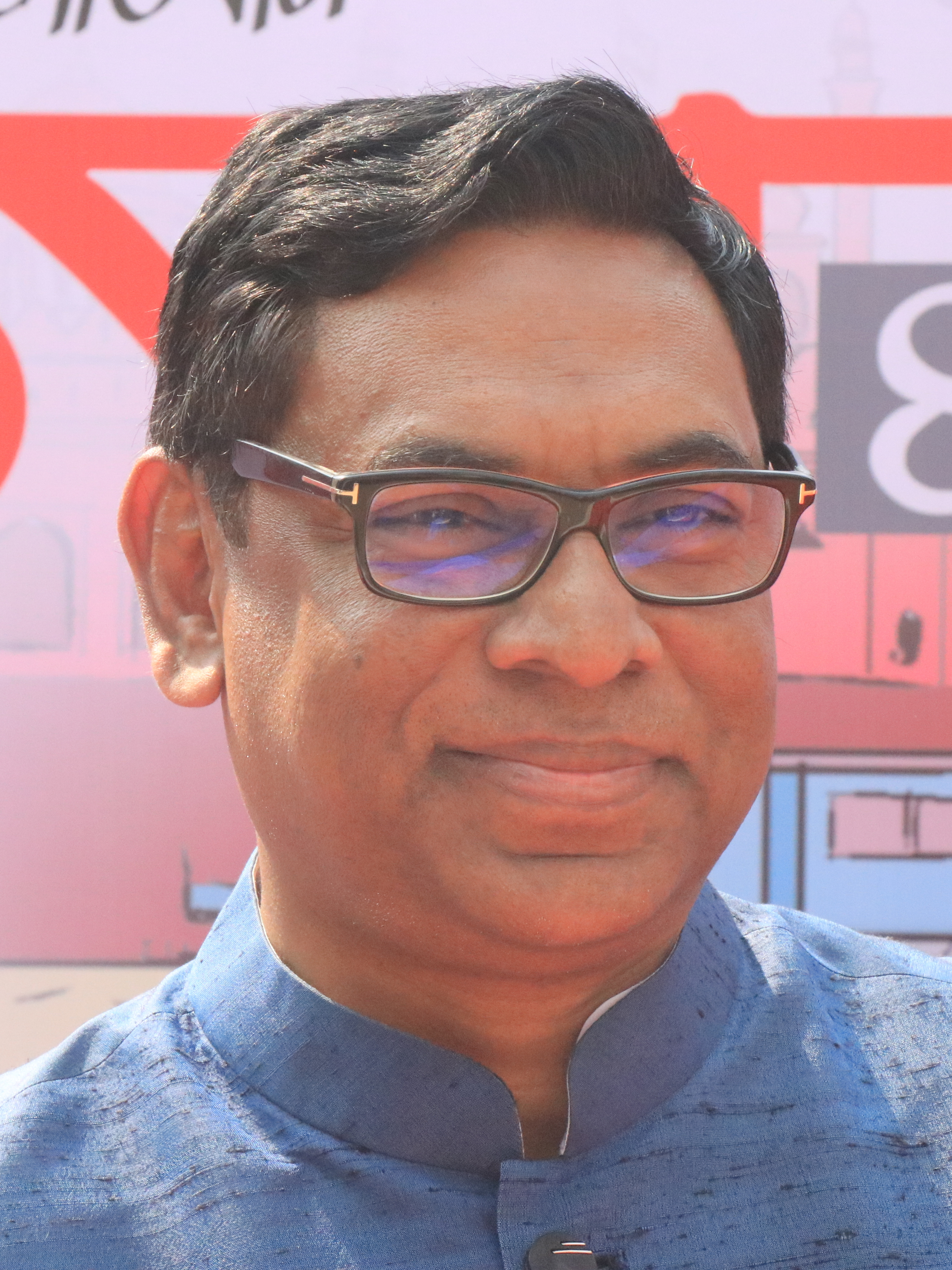
- Hamid in 2018

Minister of State for Power, Energy and Mineral Resources
- In office 26 January 2014 – 15 August 2024
- Prime Minister: Sheikh Hasina
- Preceded by: Muhammad Enamul Huq

Member of the Bangladesh Parliament for Dhaka-3
- In office 6 January 2009 – 6 August 2024
- Preceded by: Amanullah Aman

Personal details
- Born: 13 November 1964 (age 61) Dhaka, East Pakistan, Pakistan
- Party: Bangladesh Awami League
- Education: University of Dhaka
- Occupation: Politician
- Website: www.nasrulhamid.com

Nasrul Hamid (born 13 November 1964) is an Awami League politician. He is a former Bangladesh State Minister of Power, Energy, and Mineral Resources and a former Jatiya Sangsad member representing the Dhaka-3 constituency.

== Early life and education ==
Hamid was born on 13 November 1964. He completed his S.S.C. in 1980, and his H.S.C. in 1982 from the Dhaka Residential Model College. He completed his bachelor's degree from University of Dhaka. He has completed a course on leadership titled “Leaders in Development: Managing Change in a Dynamic World” from the John F. Kennedy School at Harvard University.

== Career ==
Hamid took primary membership of the Awami League in 1995, being appointed as the General Secretary of the Keraniganj Upazila Awami League. He competed in the 2001 general election. Hamid was elected to Parliament from Dhaka-3 (Keraniganj) in 2008. He received 112,623 votes while his nearest rival, Gayeshwar Chandra Roy of Bangladesh Nationalist Party, received 70,680 votes.

Hamid was re-elected in 2014 from Dhaka-3.

Hamid was elected to Parliament from Dhaka-3 as a candidate of Awami League in 2018. He secured victory in the general election for the fourth consecutive term, representing the Dhaka-3 constituency in the 12th National Election held on January 7, 2024.

Hamid has been serving as State Minister for the Ministry of Power, Energy and Mineral Resources since 2014. He was appointed again to the same position for the second time in the year 2019 and he joined on 7 January 2019. He was sworn in as the State Minister for the Power Division on January 11, 2024, for his third term. On January 15, he was given the responsibility of the Energy and Mineral Resources Division as well. When the Independence Award (Swadhinata Padak) was given to the Power Division for its role in bringing 100% of the country under electricity coverage in 2022, Hamid received the award on behalf of the division from the prime minister Sheikh Hasina. He immediately handed it back to the premiere in recognition of her role in bringing the entire Bangladesh under electric coverage.

Hamid is also a trustee of CRI (Center for Research and Information), which is the research wing of the Awami League.

In April 2025, Hamid's property in Gulshan was seized following a court order after a plea from the Anti-Corruption Commission.

== Awards ==
Hamid was awarded the Order of Civil Merit (Orden del Civil Mérito) of Spain from Spanish Ambassador Álvaro de Salas Giménez de Azcárate on behalf of King Felipe VI of Spain at a program in Dhaka.
