= Mir Abul Khayer =

Bangladeshi politician

Member of Bangladesh Parliament
- In office 1973–1979
- Succeeded by: Anwar Uddin Shikdar

Personal details
- Political party: Bangladesh Awami League

Mir Abul Khayer is a Bangladesh Awami League politician and a former member of parliament for Dhaka-4.

== Career ==
Khayer was elected to parliament from Dhaka-4 as a Bangladesh Awami League candidate in 1973.
