= Sanjida Khanam =

Bangladeshi politician

- সানজিদা খানম

Member of the Bangladesh Parliament for Reserved Women's Seat-32
- In office 28 February 2024 – 6 August 2024
- Preceded by: Khodeza Nasreen Akhter Hossain

Member of the Bangladesh Parliament for Reserved Women's Seat-24
- In office 14 January 2014 – 7 January 2019
- Preceded by: Shefali Momtaz
- Succeeded by: Tamanna Nusrat Bubly

Member of the Bangladesh Parliament for Dhaka-4
- In office 25 January 2009 – 24 January 2014
- Preceded by: Salah Uddin Ahmed
- Succeeded by: Syed Abu Hossain Babla

Personal details
- Born: 1 January 1963 (age 62)
- Political party: Bangladesh Awami League

Sanjida Khanam (born 1 Jan 1963) is a Bangladesh Awami League politician and a 3-time served former Jatiya Sangsad member.

== Career ==
Khanam was elected to Parliament in 2008 from Dhaka-4 as an Awami League candidate.

Khanam did not contest the election from Dhaka-4 in 2014 after the Awami League decided to support the Jatiya Party candidate Syed Abu Hossain Babla. She was appointed to the 10th parliament from the 24th women's reserved seat.
