= Ruma Chakraborty =

Bangladeshi politician

- রুমা চক্রবর্তী

Member of the Bangladesh Parliament for Reserved women's seat-39
- In office 28 February 2024 – 6 August 2024
- Preceded by: Tamanna Nusrat Bubly

Personal details
- Born: 5 March 1956 (age 70)
- Party: Bangladesh Awami League

Ruma Chakraborty (born 5 March 1956) is a Bangladeshi Awami League politician and a former Jatiya Sangsad member from a women's reserved for Sylhet District. She is the president of the Beanibazar Upazila unit of the Mohila Awami League.
