= Shyampur Thana =

Thana in Dhaka South City Corporation, Bangladesh

Shyampur Thana শ্যামপুর থানা
- Thana
- Expandable map of vicinity of Shyampur Thana
- Location of Shyampur Thana within Dhaka Location of Shyampur Thana within Dhaka Division Location of Shyampur Thana within Bangladesh
- Coordinates: 23.68570°N 90.44621°E
- Country: Bangladesh
- Division: Dhaka Division
- District: Dhaka District
- Established as a thana: 2008

Area
  - Total: 1.66 km^{2} (0.64 sq mi)
- Elevation: 23 m (75 ft)

Population (2022)
  - Total: 173,804
  - Density: 110,881/km^{2} (287,180/sq mi)
- Time zone: UTC+6 (BST)
- Postal code: 1236
- Area code: 02

Shyampur (Bengali: শ্যামপুর) is a Thana of Dhaka Metropolitan Police in Bangladesh.

== Geography ==
Shyampur is bounded by Jatrabari Thana on the north, Kadamtali Thana and Keraniganj Upazila on the south, Kadamtali Thana on the east and Gendaria Thana and Keraniganj Upazila on the west. Its total area is 2.31 km^{2}.

== Demographics ==
Religions in Shyampur Thana (2022)
Religion	Percent
Islam	97.31%
Hinduism	2.66%
Other or not stated	0.03%

According to the 2022 Bangladeshi census, Shyampur Thana had 46,830 households and a population of 173,805. 7.93% of the population were under 5 years of age. Shyampur had a literacy rate (age 7 and over) of 80.56%: 80.76% for males and 80.32% for females, and a sex ratio of 122.56 males for every 100 females.

According to the 2011 Census of Bangladesh, Shyampur Thana has a population of 184,062 with average household size of 4.3 members, and an average literacy rate of 65.4% compared to the national average of 51.8%.

== Administration ==
Shyampur has 1 Union/Ward, 7 Mauzas/Mahallas, and 3 villages.

== See also ==
- Upazilas of Bangladesh
- Districts of Bangladesh
- Divisions of Bangladesh
