= Jangipur, Jaunpur =

Village in Jaunpur, Uttar Pradesh, India

Coordinates: 24.47°N 88.07°E

Jangipur is a village in Jaunpur, Uttar Pradesh, India.
