= Gayeshwar Chandra Roy =

Bangladeshi politician

- গয়েশ্বর চন্দ্র রায়
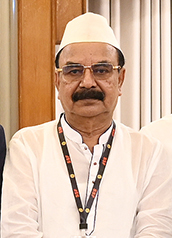
- Roy in 2025

Member of Parliament
- Incumbent
- Assumed office 17 February 2026
- Preceded by: Nasrul Hamid
- Constituency: Dhaka-3

Minister of State for Environment and Forest
- In office 19 September 1991 – 19 March 1996
- Prime Minister: Khaleda Zia
- Preceded by: Qazi Fazlur Rahman
- Succeeded by: Muhammad Yunus

Minister of State for Fisheries and Livestock
- In office 19 September 1991 – 13 September 1993
- Prime Minister: Khaleda Zia
- Preceded by: Qazi Fazlur Rahman
- Succeeded by: A. Z. A. Nasiruddin

Personal details
- Born: 1 November 1951 (age 74) Keraniganj, Dhaka District, East Bengal, Dominion of Pakistan
- Party: Bangladesh Nationalist Party
- Other political affiliations: Jatiya Samajtantrik Dal (before 1978)
- Relations: Nipun Roy Chowdhury (daughter-in-law)
- Children: 2
- Occupation: Politician

Gayeshwar Chandra Roy (born 1 November 1951) is a Bangladesh Nationalist Party (BNP) politician and the incumbent Jatiya Sangsad member representing the Dhaka-3 constituency since February 2026. He is a former state minister of the Bangladesh Government. He is currently serving as a Standing Committee member of the party. He was a member of Jatiya Samajtantrik Dal during the 1970s.

== Early life ==
Roy was born on 1 November 1951 in Dhaka district of the then East Bengal, Dominion of Pakistan (now in Bangladesh), to Gannandra Chandra Roy and Sumoti Roy. Amitav Roy, son of Gayeshwar Chandra Roy, has married Nipun Roy Chowdhury, daughter of Nitai Roy Chowdhury.

== Career ==
Roy was involved in progressive politics during his student life. When the Bangladesh Jatiyatabadi Jubo Dal was formed in 1978, he joined the youth organization. Later, he served as the General Secretary of Jubo Dal. After winning the 1991 Bangladeshi general election and forming the BNP government, he was appointed as the State Minister for the then Ministry of Environment and Forests (now the Ministry of Environment, Forest, and Climate Change) under the technocrat quota. Subsequently, he was nominated as the Joint Secretary General of BNP and later as a member of the party's Standing Committee.

In the 2008 Bangladeshi general election, Roy contested from the Dhaka-3 constituency as a BNP candidate for the first time, receiving 78,810 votes but losing to Awami League's Nasrul Hamid. In the 2018 Bangladeshi general election, he was again nominated by BNP for the same constituency.

Roy won the 2026 Bangladeshi general election contesting at the Dhaka-3 constituency securing 99,163 votes while his nearest opponent Bangladesh Jamaat-e-Islami candidate Md. Shahinur Islam received 83,264 votes.
