= Jahangirpur, Kapurthala =

Jahangirpur
- Village
- Location in Punjab, India Jahangirpur (India)
- Coordinates: 31.396635°N 75.297485°E
- Country: India
- State: Punjab
- District: Kapurthala

Government
  - Type: Panchayati raj (India)
  - Body: Gram panchayat

Population (2011)
  - Total: 1,462
- Sex ratio 758/704♂/♀

Languages
  - Official: Punjabi
  - Other spoken: Hindi
- Time zone: UTC+5:30 (IST)
- PIN: 144601
- Telephone code: 01822
- ISO 3166 code: IN-PB
- Vehicle registration: PB-09
- Website: kapurthala.gov.in

Jahangirpur is a village in Kapurthala district of Punjab State, India. It is located 9 kilometres (5.6 mi) from Kapurthala, which is both district and sub-district headquarters of Jahangirpur. The village is administrated by a Sarpanch, who is an elected representative.

== Demography ==
According to the report published by Census India in 2011, Jahangirpur has 274 houses with the total population of 1,462 persons of which 758 are male and 704 females. Literacy rate of Jahangirpur is 68.75%, lower than the state average of 75.84%. The population of children in the age group 0–6 years is 169 which is 11.56% of the total population. Child sex ratio is approximately 779, lower than the state average of 846.

== Population data ==
Particulars	Total	Male	Female
Total No. of Houses	274	-	-
Population	1,462	758	704
Child (0-6)	169	95	74
Schedule Caste	504	260	244
Schedule Tribe	0	0	0
Literacy	68.75 %	71.49 %	65.87 %
Total Workers	513	436	77
Main Worker	504	0	0
Marginal Worker	9	3	6
