= Tamanna Nusrat Bubly =

Bangladeshi politician (born 1984)

- তামান্না নুসরাত বুবলী

Member of the Bangladesh Parliament for Reserved Women's Seat-24
- In office 30 January 2019 – 29 January 2024
- Preceded by: Sanjida Khanam
- Succeeded by: Ruma Chakraborty

Personal details
- Born: 1 March 1984 (age 41) Narshingdi, Bangladesh
- Political party: Bangladesh Awami League
- Education: HSC
- Occupation: Business

Tamanna Nusrat Bubly (born 1 March 1984) is a Bangladesh Awami League politician and former member of the Bangladesh Parliament from a reserved seat. She is the widow of Awami League leader Lokman Hossain, who was assassinated in a gun attack in 2011, who was then sitting Narsingdi municipality mayor.

== Career ==
Bubly was elected to parliament from reserved seat as a Bangladesh Awami League candidate in 2019.

Bubly was the women's affairs secretary of the Narsingdi District unit of the Awami League, but later she was expelled from the party for allegations of using a proxy in the BA exams.

Bubly was arrested in September 2025 by the Detective Branch.
