= Jahangirabad, Lorestan =

Jahangirabad جهانگيراباد
- Village
- Location within Iran
- Coordinates: 33°22′51″N 48°36′07″E
- Country: Iran
- Province: Lorestan
- County: Khorramabad
- Bakhsh: Central
- Rural District: Azna

Population (2006)
  - Total: 29
- Time zone: UTC+3:30 (IRST)
  - Summer (DST): UTC+4:30 (IRDT)

Jahangirabad (Persian: جهانگيراباد, also Romanized as Jahāngīrābād) is a village in Azna Rural District, in the Central District of Khorramabad County, Lorestan Province, Iran. At the 2006 census, its population was 29, in 8 families.
