= Aolad Hossain =

Bangladeshi politician

Awlad Hossen
- আওলাদ হোসেন

Member of Parliament for Dhaka-4
- In office 30 January 2024 – 6 August 2024
- Preceded by: Sayed Abu Hossain

Personal details
- Born: 4 June 1961 (age 64) Dhaka
- Party: Bangladesh Awami League
- Occupation: Politician

Md. Awlad Hossen is a Bangladeshi politician. He is a former Jatiya Sangsad member representing the Dhaka-4 constituency.

== Early life ==
Awlad Hossain was a student of Notre Dame College. Later he studied in the veterinary department of Bangladesh Agricultural University. At that time, he was elected as the general secretary of Bangladesh Agricultural University Central Students' Union.

== Political life ==
During his student life, Awlad Hossain was a member of Chhatra League. Later he joined Bangladesh Awami League and served as assistant private secretary to the Awami League president from 2001 to 2006.

Hossain contested as an independent candidate in the 12th parliament elections of 2024 in the Dhaka-4 constituency and was elected a member of parliament.
