= Jahangir Harun =

Bangladeshi general

Md Jahangir Harun
- Born: 16 July 1966 (age 60)
- Military career
- Allegiance: Bangladesh
- Branch: Bangladesh Army
- Service years: 1989 – 2022
- Rank: Major General
- Service number: BA - 3575
- Unit: East Bengal Regiment
- Commands: GOC of 33rd Infantry Division; Commandant of BIPSOT; Commander of President Guard Regiment; Commander of 52nd Infantry Brigade
- Awards: Sena Gourab Padak(SGP)

Jahangir Harun SGP, ndc, afwc, psc is a retired major general in the Bangladesh Army. He was GOC of the 33rd Infantry Division and area commander, Cumilla Area. Prior to joining there, he served as commandant of Bangladesh Institute of Peace Support Operation Training (BIPSOT).

== Career ==
He was commissioned with the 20th BMA Long Course on 23 June 1989. Harun served as commander of the PGR when he was a brigadier general. During the Corona pandemic, he played a pivotal role to control to raise awareness about coronavirus. Under his supervision, 33 Infantry Division celebrated Armed Forces Day by awarded one thousand freedom fighters and their families. He also serves as chairman of the governing body of Mainamati Golf and Country Club.
