= Qamrul Islam =

Bangladeshi politician

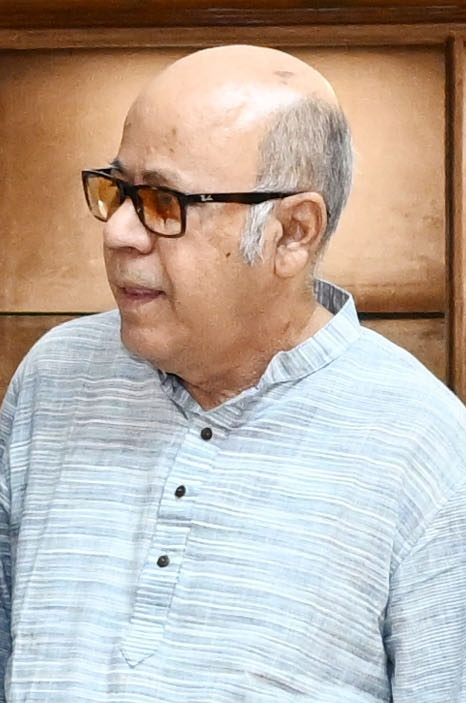
- Islam in 2024

Minister of Food
- In office 19 June 2016 – 6 January 2019
- Preceded by: Nuruzzaman Ahmed
- Succeeded by: Sadhan Chandra Majumder

State minister for Law, Justice and Parliamentary Affairs
- In office 6 January 2009 – 24 January 2014

Member of the Bangladesh Parliament for Dhaka-2
- In office 25 January 2009 – 6 August 2024
- Preceded by: Abdul Mannan

Personal details
- Born: 1 June 1950 (age 76)
- Party: Bangladesh Awami League

Qamrul Islam (born 1 June 1950) is an Awami League politician. He is a former Jatiya Sangsad member representing the Dhaka-2 constituency, and also a former minister of food from 2014 to 2018. Islam was the state minister of law, justice and parliamentary affairs in the second Hasina cabinet.

== Career ==
Ismal was former Prime Minister Sheikh Hasina's defense lawyer during the 2007-2008 caretaker government rule in the Niko corruption case along with barrister Sheikh Fazle Noor Taposh.

Islam was elected to parliament in 2008 as a candidate of the Awami League from Dhaka-2. He received 180,172 votes while his nearest rival, Md. Matiur Rahman of the Bangladesh Nationalist Party, received 124,600 votes. He was appointed the State minister for Law, Justice and Parliamentary Affairs in 2009. He prepared the Cantonment Board eviction notice which was sent to former Prime Minister Khaleda Zia to evict her from her cantonment residence. He recommended the removal of about 7.5 thousand criminal cases filed against Awami League politicians under the 2007-2008 Fakruddin Ahmed led caretaker government. The Bangladesh Nationalist Party criticized him for not removing cases filed against its leaders and alleged the government was filing new cases against them. He alleged the Pakistani Inter-Services Intelligence (ISI) was responsible for the Bangladesh Rifles mutiny in an effort to overthrow the government of Sheikh Hasina. He was the Joint Secretary General of the Dhaka unit of the Awami League.

Islam was elected unopposed in the 2014 election after other major parties boycotted the election. He was appointed the Minister of Food in 2014. He had been critical of the United States saying, "The US is the creator of the IS. The US is the original creator of militants. The US is trying to enter Bangladesh, saying militancy exists here.". Bangladesh Nationalist Party demanded his resignation in May 2015 alleging he had imported rotten wheat from Brazil.

Islam was convicted on contempt of court charges in 2016 over his comments on the conviction of Mir Quasem Ali by the International Crimes Tribunal. Shahdeen Malik claimed he had lost his right to ministerial position after the conviction and the opposition Bangladesh Nationalist Party called for his resignation. Anisul Huq, Minister of Law, said he did not have to resign as the judges did not call for it but refrained from saying much as he feared he could be found guilty of contempt of court. He and A. K. M. Mozammel Huq, Minister of Liberation War Affairs were fined 50 thousand BDT each for making contemptuous statements about Chief Justice Surendra Kumar Sinha. He called for Sinha's removal after meeting with Bangabandhu Awami Lawyers’ Association at the office of Dhaka Lawyers’ Association in August 2017.

Islam was blamed for increase in rise prices in 2017 due to lack of preparation after rice fields were damaged in floods. He denied reports of the government having low stock of food.

Islam served as the Minister of Food till 2018. He was re-elected in 2018 as a candidate of the Awami League from Dhaka-2. He received 339,581 votes while his nearest rival, Irfan Ibne Aman Omi of the Bangladesh Nationalist Party, received 47,195. He was a member of the Parliamentary Standing Committee on the Chittagong Hill Tracts Affairs Ministry. In February 2022, he was appointed presidium member of the Awami League along with Mofazzal Hossain Maya.

Islam was re-elected on 7 January 2024 with 154,448 votes while his nearest rival, Dr Habibur Rahman, received 10,635 votes.

Islam was arrested from Uttara on 18 November 2024 after the fall of the Sheikh Hasina led Awami League government. He was charged with the death of a protestor in the 2024 quota reform protests. The Anti-Corruption Commission began an investigation against him, his wife, and children.
