= Jahangir, Punjab =

Jahangir
- Village
- Location in Punjab, India Jahangir (India)
- Coordinates: 31.169808°N 75.4006351°E
- Country: India
- State: Punjab
- District: Jalandhar
- Tehsil: Nakodar

Government
  - Type: Panchayat raj
  - Body: Gram panchayat
- Elevation: 240 m (790 ft)

Population (2011)
  - Total: 652
- Sex ratio 348/304 ♂/♀

Languages
  - Official: Punjabi
- Time zone: UTC+5:30 (IST)
- ISO 3166 code: IN-PB
- Vehicle registration: PB- 08
- Website: jalandhar.nic.in

Jahangir is a village in Nakodar in Jalandhar district of Punjab State, India. It is located 13 km from Nakodar, 29 kilometres (18 mi) from Kapurthala, 29 kilometres (18 mi) from district headquarter Jalandhar and 169 kilometres (105 mi) from state capital Chandigarh. The village is administrated by a sarpanch who is an elected representative of village as per Panchayati raj (India).

== Transport ==
The village is 75 kilometres (47 mi) from the domestic airport in Ludhiana. The nearest international airport is located in Chandigarh. Sri Guru Ram Dass Jee International Airport is the second nearest airport 127 kilometres (79 mi) away in Amritsar.
