= Mijanur Rahman Khan =

Bangladeshi military personnel

- Military career
- Allegiance: Bangladesh
- Branch: Bangladesh Army; Bangladesh Ansar
- Service years: 19 May 1985 – 2018
- Rank: Major General
- Unit: East Bengal Regiment
- Commands: Director General of Bangladesh Ansar and VDP; Area Commander of Logistics Area; Commander of 88th Infantry Brigade; Commander of 52nd Infantry Brigade; Additional Director General of RAB
- Conflicts: UNMIL
- Police career
- Unit: Rapid Action Battalion
- Allegiance: Bangladesh
- Branch: Bangladesh Police
- Rank: Additional Director

Mijanur Rahman Khan is a retired major general in the Bangladesh Army. He was the director general of national paramilitary force Bangladesh Ansar and Village Defence Party.

== Career ==
Khan was additional director general of the Rapid Action Battalion in 2009. He also served as the brigade commander of 52 Infantry Brigade and 88 Infantry Brigade. He was also area commander, headquarter logistics area. In 2013, he was deputy director general of national paramilitary force Bangladesh Ansar and Village Defence Party. By 2016, he was their director general.

Khan was the chairman of Ansar-VDP Unnayan Bank.
