= Jahangirabad, Ilam =

Jahangirabad جهانگيراباد
- Village
- Location within Iran
- Coordinates: 33°06′55″N 47°21′47″E
- Country: Iran
- Province: Ilam
- County: Darreh Shahr
- Bakhsh: Central
- Rural District: Zarrin Dasht

Population (2006)
  - Total: 533
- Time zone: UTC+3:30 (IRST)
  - Summer (DST): UTC+4:30 (IRDT)

Jahangirabad (Persian: جهانگيراباد, also Romanized as Jahāngīrābād) is a village in Zarrin Dasht Rural District, in the Central District of Darreh Shahr County, Ilam Province, Iran. At the 2006 census, its population was 533, in 105 families. The village is populated by Kurds.
