= Abdul Mannan (aviation executive) =

Bangladeshi politician (c. 1942–2020)

Member of Parliament for Dhaka-2
- In office 1991–2006
- Preceded by: Burhan Uddin Khan
- Succeeded by: Qamrul Islam

Minister of State for Aviation and Tourism
- In office 1991–1996

Personal details
- Born: 1 January 1942
- Died: 4 August 2020 (aged 78)
- Party: Bangladesh Nationalist Party

Abdul Mannan (c. 1942 – 4 August 2020) was a Bangladesh Nationalist Party politician and a Jatiya Sangsad member representing the Dhaka-2 constituency.

== Career ==
Mannan was elected to parliament from Dhaka-2 as a Bangladesh Nationalist Party candidate in 1991, 1996, and 2001. He served as the state minister of civil aviation and tourism. He was an adviser to former prime minister and chairperson of Bangladesh Nationalist Party, Khaleda Zia. In 2010, he was made the president of the Dhaka District unit of the Bangladesh Nationalist Party.
