= Amanullah Aman =

Bangladeshi politician

- আমানউল্লাহ আমান
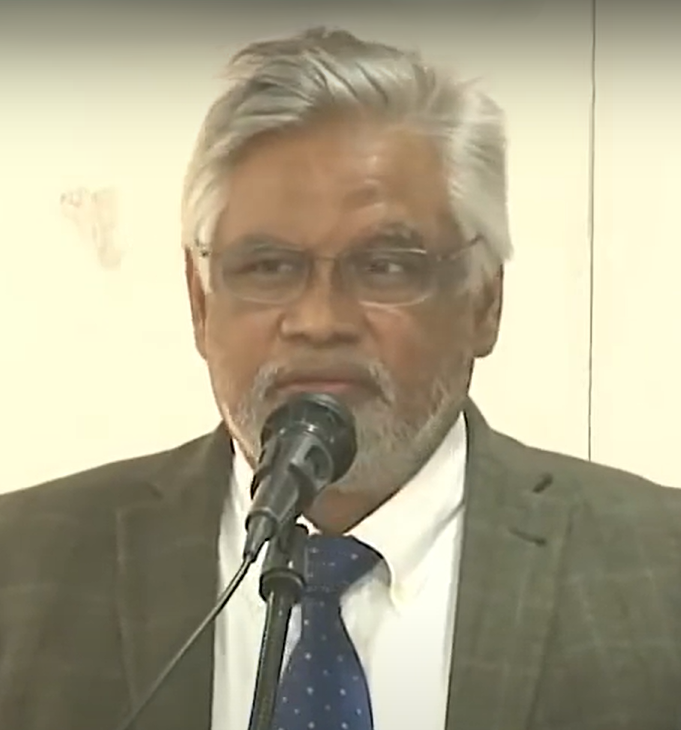
- Aman in 2022

Member of Parliament
- Incumbent
- Assumed office 17 February 2026
- Preceded by: Qamrul Islam
- Constituency: Dhaka-2
- In office 20 March 1991 – 28 October 2006
- Preceded by: Md. Saifur Rahman
- Succeeded by: Nasrul Hamid
- Constituency: Dhaka-3

Minister of State for Health and Family Welfare
- In office 9 December 2001 – 22 May 2003
- Prime Minister: Khaleda Zia
- Preceded by: Rezaul Karim Mannan
- Succeeded by: Mizanur Rahman Sinha

Minister of State for Labour and Employment
- In office 22 May 2003 – 28 October 2006
- Prime Minister: Khaleda Zia
- Preceded by: Lutfor Rahman Khan Azad
- Succeeded by: Monnujan Sufian

25th Vice President of DUCSU
- In office 1990–1991
- President: Mohammad Moniruzzaman Miah
- Preceded by: Sultan Mohammad Mansur Ahmed
- Succeeded by: Nurul Haq Nur

Personal details
- Born: Keraniganj Upazila, Dhaka District, East Pakistan
- Party: Bangladesh Nationalist Party
- Spouse: Sabera Aman
- Children: Erfan Ibne Aman Omi

Amanullah Aman is a Bangladesh Nationalist Party (BNP) politician and the incumbent Jatiya Sangsad member representing the Dhaka-2 constituency since February 2026. He is the joint secretary general of the BNP.

== Early life ==
Aman was born in Keraniganj Upazila, Dhaka District.

== Career ==
Aman started his political career in the Jatiyatabadi Chhatra Dal. He was elected as vice president of Dhaka University Central Student's Union (DUCSU) in 1990. He was one of the most prominent student leaders of anti autocracy movement in 1990 which resulted in resignation of General Ershad and a subsequent free fair election under caretaker government.

Aman was first elected as the member of parliament for Dhaka-3 in the 1991 general election. He received 97,299 votes while his nearest rival, Mostafa Mohsin Montu of Awami League, received 66,220.

Aman was elected to parliament from Dhaka-3 in the February 1996 Bangladeshi general election which was boycotted by all major parties. He was made the state minister of education. His entourage assaulted a life operator at the secretariat building. Aman was closely tied with Tanaka Group owned by his friend Mahin Chowdhury. He built his home and an office complex in Gulshan.

Aman was re-elected in the June 1996 Bangladeshi general election from Dhaka-3 as a candidate of BNP. He received 124,096 votes while his nearest rival, Md. Shah Jahan of Awami League, received 52,662 votes.

Aman was re-elected 2001 Bangladeshi general election from Dhaka-3. He received 169,980 votes while his nearest rival, Nasrul Hamid of Awami League, received 89,375 votes.

Aman served as the state minister of health and family welfare. He was later the state minister of labour and manpower. In 2004, he met the Director General of International Labour Organisation Juan Somavia in Geneva.

Aman was charged in 57 cases over public safety. On 9 May 2008, he was sentenced to seven years in jail in an extortion case filed on 6 March 2007. His wife was also an accused in the case. A former officer in charge of Keraniganj Model Police Station was sued for exempting Aman's name from the murder case of a Jubo League politician.

Aman was the former general secretary of Dhaka District unit of BNP. In October 2009, a businessman in Dhaka asked the government to protect him from Aman who had threatened the businessman for not supporting BNP.

Aman was charged with burning cars on 9 December 2012 in Tetuljhora and Aminbazar. He was indicted in November 2014.

Aman was sentenced to jail in 2014 over four cases filed against him for violence during general strikes enforced by BNP. He was relieved of charges on 16 November 2016.

On 3 February 2018, Aman was sent to jail in a case about snatching an accused from police custody. His candidacy for the 2018 Bangladeshi general election was rejected by the Election Commission. His son, Erfan Ibne Aman Omi, was instead nominated by the BNP from Dhaka-2.

On 30 April 2025, Appellate Division, Supreme Court of Bangladesh acquitted Aman and his wife Sabera Aman in a case filed by the (ACC) in March 2007, accusing the couple of amassing wealth illegally. The court also nullified a High Court verdict that had given a 13-year prison sentence for Aman and a three-year sentence for Sabera.

Aman won the 2026 Bangladeshi general election contesting at the Dhaka-2 constituency securing 163,020 votes while his nearest opponent Bangladesh Jamaat-e-Islami candidate Md. Abdul Haq received 78,655 votes. On August 15, 2026, he became a member of the National Standing Committee, the highest policy-making forum of the Bangladesh Nationalist Party (BNP).

== Personal life ==
Aman is married to Sabera Aman. They have a son, Erfan Ibne Aman Omi.
