= Goruk Kandi =

Goruk Kandi گروك كندي
- Village
- Country: Iran
- Province: West Azerbaijan
- County: Khoy
- Bakhsh: Central
- Rural District: Qarah Su

Population (2006)
  - Total: 23
- Time zone: UTC+3:30 (IRST)
  - Summer (DST): UTC+4:30 (IRDT)

Goruk Kandi (Persian: گروك كندي, also Romanized as Gorūk Kandī; also known as Jahāngīrābād) is a village in Qarah Su Rural District, in the Central District of Khoy County, West Azerbaijan Province, Iran. At the 2006 census, its population was 23, in 5 families.
