= Epicho =

Epicho: Επηχώ (Greek); Cihangir (Turkish)
- Location in Cyprus
- Coordinates: 35°13′37″N 33°30′46″E
- Country (de jure): Cyprus
  - District: Nicosia District
- Country (de facto): Northern Cyprus
  - District: Lefkoşa District

Population (2006)
  - Total: 929
- Time zone: UTC+2 (EET)
  - Summer (DST): UTC+3 (EEST)

Epicho (Greek: Επηχώ; Turkish: Cihangir) is a village in the Nicosia District of Cyprus, located near Exometochi. De facto, it is under the control of Northern Cyprus.
