= Jahangir (surname) =

Jahangir is a surname. Notable people with the surname are as follows:

- Asad Jahangir (born 1945), Pakistani police officer and cricketer
- Asma Jahangir (1952–2018), Pakistani lawyer
- Hasan Jahangir (born 1962), Pakistani musical artist
- Khandaker Abdullah Jahangir (1961–2016), Bangladeshi Islamic scholar
- Majid Jahangir, Pakistani actor
- Majeed Jahangir (born 1980), Pakistani cricketer
- Mohiuddin Jahangir, Pakistani army officer
- Muhammad Ahsan Jahangir, Pakistani politician
- Nazish Jahangir (born 1994), Pakistani television actress
- Sharfuzzaman Jahangir, Bangladeshi politician
- Shayan Jahangir (born 1994), Pakistani cricketer
- Sirine Jahangir (born 2005), British musical artist
- Syed Jahangir (1935–2018), Bangladeshi painter
