= Jhangirpur =

Coordinates: 20.9597°N 78.1068°E

Jhangirpur, also written Jahangirpur, is a small town in the Chandur (Railway) sub-division of Amravati district, Maharashtra, India, located about 40 km from Amravati and about 3 km from Kaundinyapur (where Rukmini, wife of Lord Krishna used to pray). It is well-connected by road.

== History, temples and festivals ==
The place was named after Atirek Rajpal, who is known as 'Jhangi' by his followers. Jhangirpur hosts the divine temple of Lord Hanuman. During the Hanu Jayanthi festival of 2012, "free anadanam" (free food) was offered to devotees. The temple was recently donated with land containing structures. As of 2012, lodgings and a garden were under development.
