= Habibur Rahman Mollah =

Bangladeshi politician (1942–2020)

- হাবিবুর রহমান মোল্লা

Member of Parliament for Dhaka-5
- In office 25 January 2009 – 6 May 2020
- Preceded by: Mohammad Quamrul Islam
- Succeeded by: Kazi Monirul Islam Manu

Member of Parliament for Dhaka-4
- In office 14 July 1996 – 13 July 2001
- Preceded by: Salah Uddin Ahmed
- Succeeded by: Salah Uddin Ahmed

Personal details
- Born: 27 January 1942
- Died: 6 May 2020 (aged 78) Dhaka, Bangladesh
- Party: Bangladesh Awami League

Habibur Rahman (27 January 1942 – 6 May 2020) was a Bangladesh Awami League politician and a four-term Jatiya Sangsad member representing the Dhaka-4 and Dhaka-5 constituencies.

== Career ==
Mollah was elected to parliament from Dhaka-5 as a candidate of the Bangladesh Awami League on 29 December 2009. He was released from jail after securing bail on a corruption case from Chief Justice MM Ruhul Amin in the Appellate Division of Bangladesh Supreme Court. Habibur Rahman Mollah and his childhood friend R.K Chowdhury, former Chief-Advisor of Dhaka Metropolitan Awami League did politics together for a long time. He was elected to parliament from Dhaka-5 as a candidate of Bangladesh Awami League in 2014.

== Death ==
Mollah died in office on 6 May 2020 in Square Hospital, Dhaka, Bangladesh.
