= Sayed Abu Hossain =

Bangladeshi politician

Sayed Abu Hossain (babla)
- সৈয়দ আবু হোসেন ( বাবলা)

Member of Parliament for Dhaka-4
- In office 5 January 2014 – 29 January 2024
- Preceded by: Sanjida Khanam
- Succeeded by: Awlad Hossain

Personal details
- Born: 12 October 1956 (age 70)
- Party: Jatiya Party (Ershad)

Sayed Abu Hossain (babla) (born 12 October 1956) is a Jatiya Party (Ershad) politician and former Member of Parliament from Dhaka-4.

== Early life ==
Abu Hossain was born on 12 October 1956, to Bengali Muslim parents Sayed Ikram Hossain and Fatema Khatun.

== Career ==
Hossain was elected to Parliament from Dhaka-4 in 2014 as a Jatiya Party candidate. The Bangladesh Awami League government withdrew its candidate in Dhaka-4 after reaching an agreement with Jatiya Party. On 10 June 2015, his officer was attacked. Allegedly the attack was carried out by supporters of another Member of Parliament, Sanjida Khanom. Hossain is a Presidium Member of the Jatiya Party.

=== Controversy ===
On 11 January 2016, Hossain was accused of assaulting the principal of Dholairparh School and College. He was involved in a dispute over the formation of the managing committee of Dholairparh School and College.
