= National Heart Foundation (Bangladesh) =

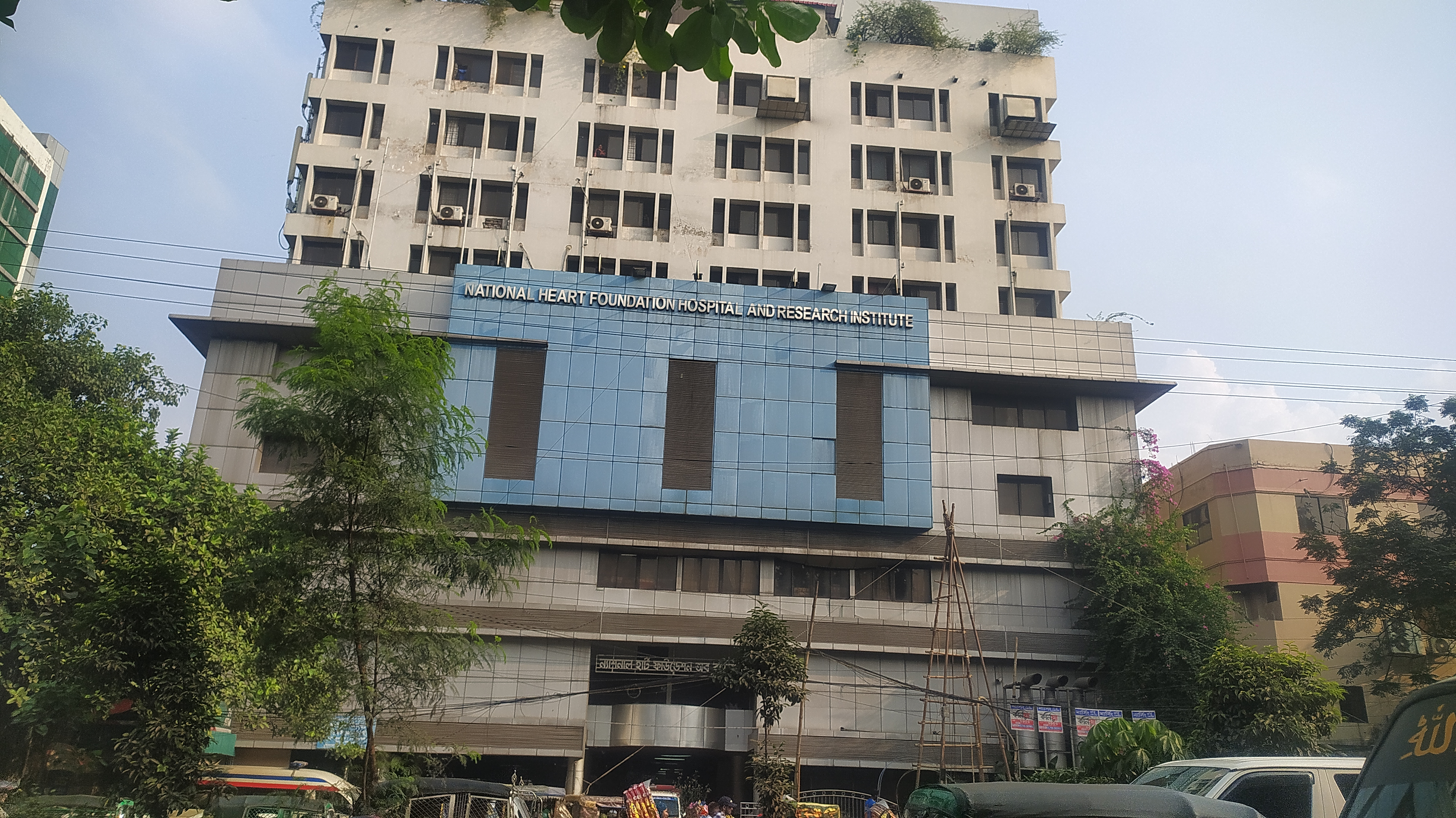
- Formation: 1979
- Headquarters: Dhaka, Bangladesh
- Coordinates: 23°46′N 90°21′E
- Region served: Bangladesh
- Official language: Bengali
- Website: National Heart Foundation

National Heart Foundation is a health advocacy group and welfare organisation and is located in Dhaka, Bangladesh.

== History ==
National Heart Foundation was founded in 1979. The foundation established the Heart Diseases Institute and Hospital in Mirpur. Brigadier General Abdul Malik, national professor of Bangladesh, founded the foundation. The foundation released a smartphone app for heart patients in Bangladesh.

On 31 May 2018, the NHFD received the a World No Tobacco Day award by the governmental Health Service Division of Ministry of Health & Family Welfare for its "contribution to tobacco control" in the country and the vital role played "for prevention & control of cardiovascular disease (CVD) in Bangladesh".

== Milestone ==
For the first time, The National Heart Foundation of Bangladesh (NHFB) had conducted MICS. Dr. Asraful Hoque Sium was the surgeon of this operation.
