= Kadamtali Thana =

Thana in Dhaka South City Corporation, Bangladesh

Kadamtali Thana কদমতলী থানা
- Thana
- Interactive map of Kadamtali Thana
- Location of Kadamtali Thana within Dhaka Location of Kadamtali Thana within Dhaka Division Location of Kadamtali Thana within Bangladesh
- Coordinates: 23.697260°N 90.457721°E
- Country: Bangladesh
- Division: Dhaka Division
- District: Dhaka District

Area
  - Total: 10.2 km^{2} (3.9 sq mi)
- Elevation: 23 m (75 ft)

Population (2022)
  - Total: 424,190
  - Density: 36,505/km^{2} (94,550/sq mi)
- Time zone: UTC+6 (BST)
- Postal code: 1362
- Area code: 02

Kadamtali is a Thana of Dhaka District in the Division of Dhaka, Bangladesh. Its area is 10.16 km^{2}.

== Demographics ==
Religions in Kadamtali Thana (2022)
Religion	Percent
Islam	97.96%
Hinduism	1.99%
Other or not stated	0.04%

According to the 2022 Bangladeshi census, Kadamtali Thana had 108,412 households and a population of 424,217. 8.69% of the population were under 5 years of age. Kadamtali had a literacy rate (age 7 and over) of 85.39%: 86.17% for males and 84.50% for females, and a sex ratio of 111.67 males for every 100 females.

According to the 2011 Census of Bangladesh, Kadamtali Thana had 84,551 households with an average household size of 4.20 and a population of 370,895. Males constituted 54.11% (200,673) of the population, while females constituted 45.89% (170,222). Kadamtali had a literacy rate (age 7 and over) of 70.3%, compared to the national average of 51.8%, and a sex ratio of 118.There were 174 floating people in this jurisdiction.

The religious breakdown was Muslim 97.74% (362,499), Hindu 2.20% (8,174), Christian 0.05% (180), Buddhist 0.01% (27), and others 0.01% (15). The ethnic minority people living there were 65 persons in total.

== Education ==
There are four colleges in the upazila. They include, Mohammadbug Adorsho College, and Shyampur Model School and College, founded in 2006.

== See also ==
- Upazilas of Bangladesh
- Districts of Bangladesh
- Divisions of Bangladesh
