= Keraniganj Upazila =

Keraniganj কেরানীগঞ্জ
- Upazila
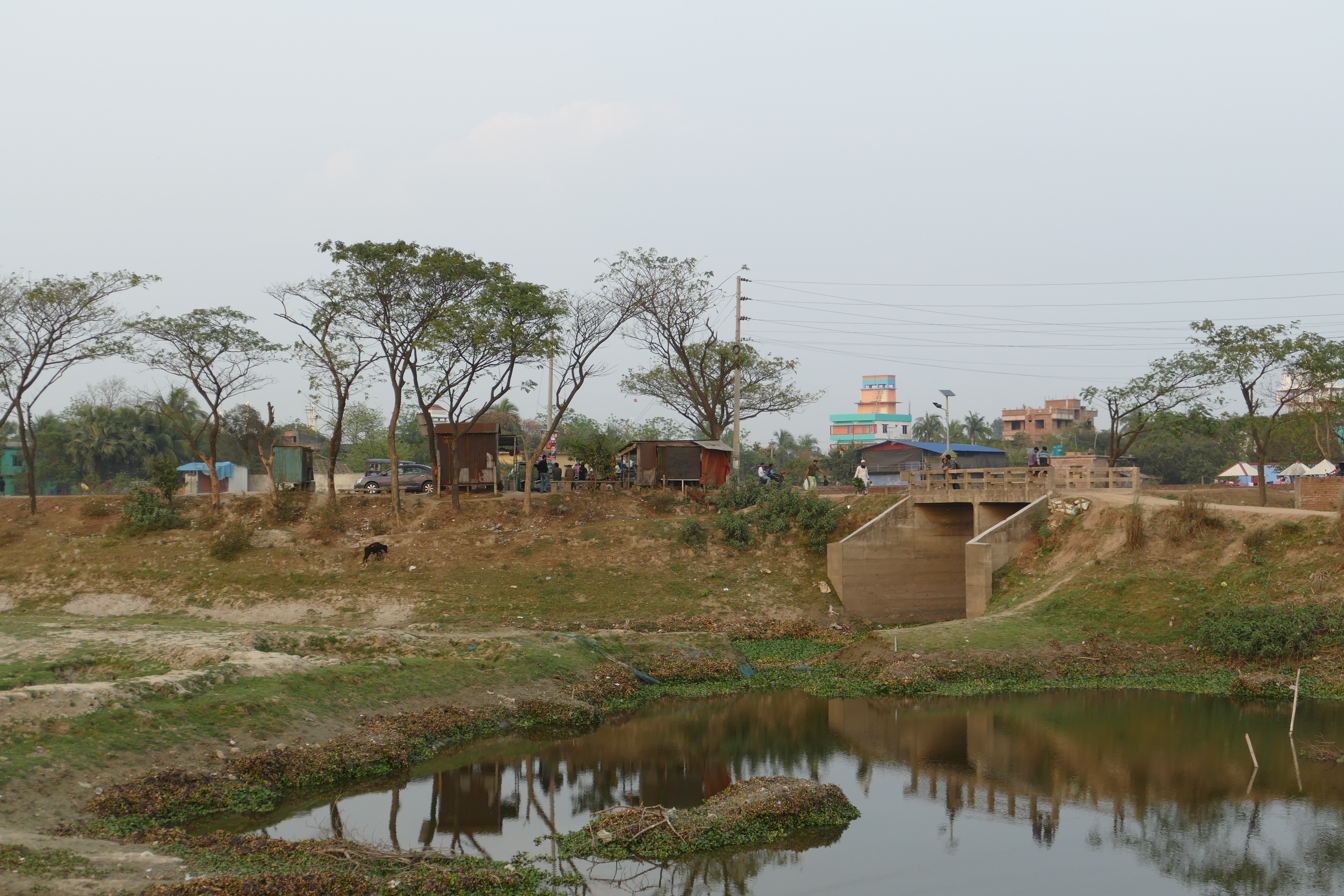
- Evening in Sharighat

- Coordinates: 23°41′N 90°20′E
- Country: Bangladesh
- Division: Dhaka
- District: Dhaka

Area
  - Total: 166.87 km^{2} (64.43 sq mi)

Population (2022)
  - Total: 1,011,063
  - Density: 6,059.0/km^{2} (15,693/sq mi)
- Time zone: UTC+6 (BST)
- Postal code: 1310
- Area code: 06224
- Website: keraniganj.dhaka.gov.bd

Keraniganj Upazila mauza geocode map

Keraniganj (Bengali: কেরানীগঞ্জ) is an upazila of Dhaka District in the division of Dhaka, Bangladesh.

== History ==
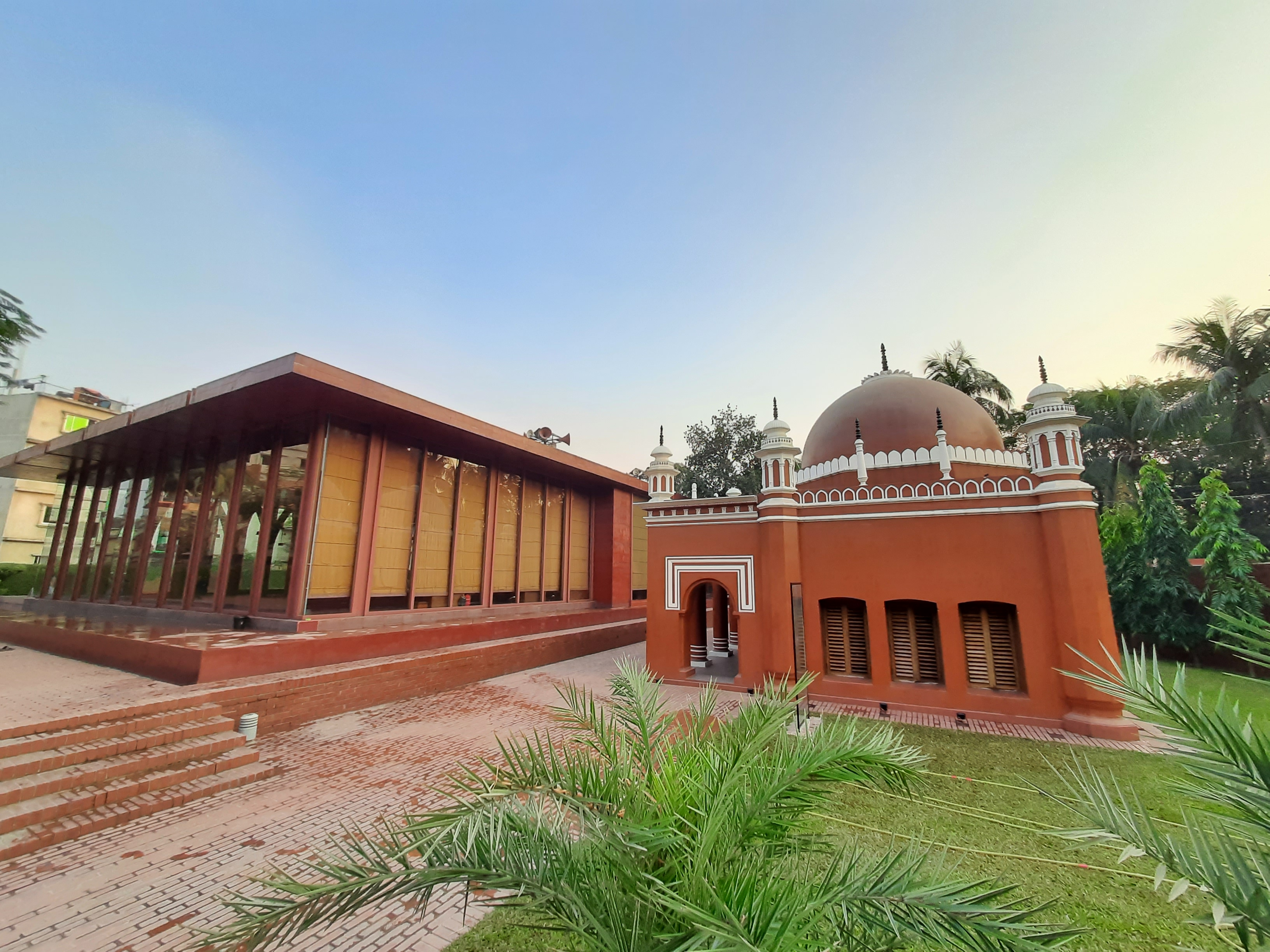
The Doleshwar Hanafia Jame Mosque in Keraniganj was the winner of the UNESCO Asia-Pacific Awards for Cultural Heritage Conservation in 2021.

During the reign of Nawab Shaista Khan the paik-peyada and clerical staff (kerani) of the Nawab are believed to have lived on the other side of the river Buriganga. The name Keraniganj is derived from this historical association.

Historically, it is believed that, after the regime change in 1757, Nawab Siraj ud-Daulah's wife and one of his aunts were in prison at Zinzira in Keraniganj. Strategically, Keraniganj played a vital role during the liberation war of Bangladesh (1971), specially in the guerrilla warfare. Many of the guerrilla operations in Dhaka city were planned and conducted from Keraniganj and, for this reason, it had to pay for this.

The Pakistani army set fire to many houses in Konakhola, Basta, Brahmankirtha, Ghatarchar, Monohorea, Joynagar, Ramerkanda, Rohitpur, Poraati, Goalkhali and Khagail Kholamora villages. The Pakistani Army fired on many people at Zinzira on 2 April 1971. The freedom Fighters later conducted extensive guerrilla attacks on the Pakistani army and freed Keraniganj Upazila forever.

== Geography ==
The town of Keraniganj stands on the southwest side of Dhaka City on the bank of the Buriganga river. Keraniganj Upazila with an area of 166.87 km^{2}, is bounded by Savar Upazila and Mohammadpur, Hazaribagh, Kamrangir Char, Lalbagh, Kotwali and Sutrapur Thanas to the northeast, Shyampur Thana and Narayanganj and Sadar Upazilas to the east, Serajdikhan Upazila to the south, and by Nawabganj and Singair Upazilas to the west. The main rivers are the Buriganga and Dhaleshwari. Keraniganj is connected to Dhaka Metropolitan through two modern bridge (Buriganga Bridge-2 and Bangladesh China friendship bridge which is also known as Burignaga Bridge-1) over Buriganga river.

According to police administration, Keraniganj is now divided into two thanas which are South Keraniganj and Keraniganj Model Thana, respectively. The Bangladesh government has a plan to integrate Keraniganj Upazila into Dhaka municipality in the near future, to accommodate the expansion of the capital. It is served by Keraniganj railway station.

== Demographics ==
Religions in Keraniganj upazila (2022)
Religion	Percent
Islam	93.90%
Hinduism	6.07%
Other or not stated	0.03%

According to the 2022 Bangladeshi census, Keraniganj Upazila had 263,995 households and a population of 1,011,063. 8.68% of the population were under 5 years of age. Keraniganj had a literacy rate (age 7 and over) of 81.18%: 82.72% for males and 79.42% for females, and a sex ratio of 113.83 males for every 100 females. 93,532 (9.25%) lived in urban areas.

According to the 2011 Census of Bangladesh, Keraniganj Upazila had 177,970 households and a population of 794,360. 167,044 (21.03%) were under 10 years of age. Keraniganj had a literacy rate (age 7 and over) of 58.5%, compared to the national average of 51.8%, and a sex ratio of 883 females per 1000 males. The entire population lived in rural areas.

== Notable residents ==
- Mohammad Rafique, left arm spinner for the Bangladesh National Cricket Team, lives in the town of Aganagar, where he grew up.
- Prasanna Kumar Roy, better known as Dr P. K. Roy was an educationist and the first Indian principal of Presidency College, Kolkata.
- Imdad Hossain, Bangladeshi artist and language movement activist.
- Waheedul Haq, prominent journalist, writer, and musicologist of Tagore songs.
- Amanullah Aman, Presidium member of Bangladesh Nationalist Party and the former State Minister of health and later labour and employment.
- Nasrul Hamid, Awami League politician and former State Minister for the Ministry of Power, Energy, and Mineral Resources of Bangladesh.

== Ethnomedicine of Keraniganj ==
In 2019, an ethnopharmacological survey found 38 medicinal plant species (25 identified, from 21 families) used in Keraniganj by local folk healers. The healers primarily use leaves (84%), and also roots, fruits, stems, bark, whole plants, seeds, flowers, and wood to treat about 30 ailments, including respiratory problems, gastrointestinal issues, fever, diabetes, skin diseases, pain, and more.

== See also ==
- Upazilas of Bangladesh
- Districts of Bangladesh
- Divisions of Bangladesh
- Abdullahpur of keraniganj
- Hazratpur of keraniganj
