= 2020 Bangladesh Election Commission scandal =

Political scandal

The Bangladesh election commission scandal of 2020 is the revelation of a series of corruption allegations, moral degradation of the commissioners and evidence of gross misconducts before and after the controversial 2018 Bangladeshi general election and 2019 Upazila polls in Bangladesh. Allegations included the misappropriation of around 20 million Bangladeshi taka for imaginary programs, embezzlement of 40.8 million BDT during the recruitment process of election commission staffs, purchasing the electronic voting machine at a higher price than the market rate, usage of extra cars by three election commissioners flouting rules and facilitating continuous and numerous election fraud by not investigating credible allegations of irregularities during the 11th Parliamentary Election and elections in Dhaka North and Dhaka South City Corporations, Khulna City Corporation, and Gazipur City Corporation.

On December 19, 2020, 42 eminent citizens of the country including senior professors, economists, and election observers sent a letter to the President and urged to form the Supreme Judicial Council (SJC) to investigate the allegations of "financial irregularities, corruption and gross election-related misconduct" against the election commission led by KM Nurul Huda.

== Bangladesh election administrative system ==
The establishment of an election commission in Bangladesh to oversee parliamentary and other local body elections, is facilitated by Article 118 of Part VII of the constitution. The commission will be formed with a chief election commissioner and no more than four election commissioners to assist him. The functionality of the commissioners and the commission is further clarified by The Representation of the People Order, 1972. According to the constitution, the commission will be an independent body and the commissioners will be appointed by the President of the country for five years. They can be removed by the President as well in case of proven misbehavior or incapacity.

Bangladesh Election Commission is trusted with the responsibilities of holding free, fair, and credible elections in Bangladesh. Since 2017, the commission is led by KM Nurul Huda as the chief election commissioner with four other commissioners. The commission oversaw the controversial 2018 Bangladeshi general election which was marred by unprecedented violence causing the death of dozens of individuals on the election day. The Bangladesh chapter of Transparency International found rampant irregularities in 94% of the constituencies during the election and the U.S. State Department opined "election-day irregularities prevented some people from voting, which undermined faith in the electoral process."

== Corruption allegations ==
The election commission led by CEC KM Nurul Huda was criticized by the main opposition BNP and civil society because of its incapability to hold fair elections in city corporations polls. Though the opposition made several allegations, none of them were investigated.

In the lead-up to the 2018 Bangladeshi general election, the election commission planned a series of activities including purchasing of electronic voting machines (EVM) which raised the eyebrows of many observers, and corruption allegations started arising.

=== High-priced EVM purchase ===
The election commissioned purchased electronic voting machines (EVM) at a price of 234,373 BDT per piece where similar types of machines were procured by their Indian counterpart at a price of 21,250 BDT, almost 11 times lower than that of Bangladesh's paid amount. In 2011, Bangladesh's election body purchased 700 EVMs at a price of BDT 46,501 each from Bangladesh Machine Tools Factory Ltd, which was almost four times lower than the price of EVMs bought in 2018.

The EVM used in India also has voter-verified paper audit trail (VVPAT) which was not included in Bangladesh's purchased ones, ignoring the recommendation of the technical committee led by Jamilur Reza Choudhury.

One of the four election commissioners, Mahbub Talukdar walked out from the election commissioners' meeting protesting the move to change the RPO to buy and use the high priced EVMs in August 2018.

=== Honorarium for imaginary speeches ===
Chief Election Commissioner KM Nurul Huda, his four deputies, election commission secretary Helal Uddin Ahmed, an additional secretary and two joint secretaries of the commission took 20 million BDT fees for "special speeches" as "special speakers" at the training programs for the 11th national parliamentary election and the Upazila polls. In addition to that Helal Uddin Ahmed drew 4.7 million BDT, an abnormally high amount, for the role of ‘course consultant’ alone.

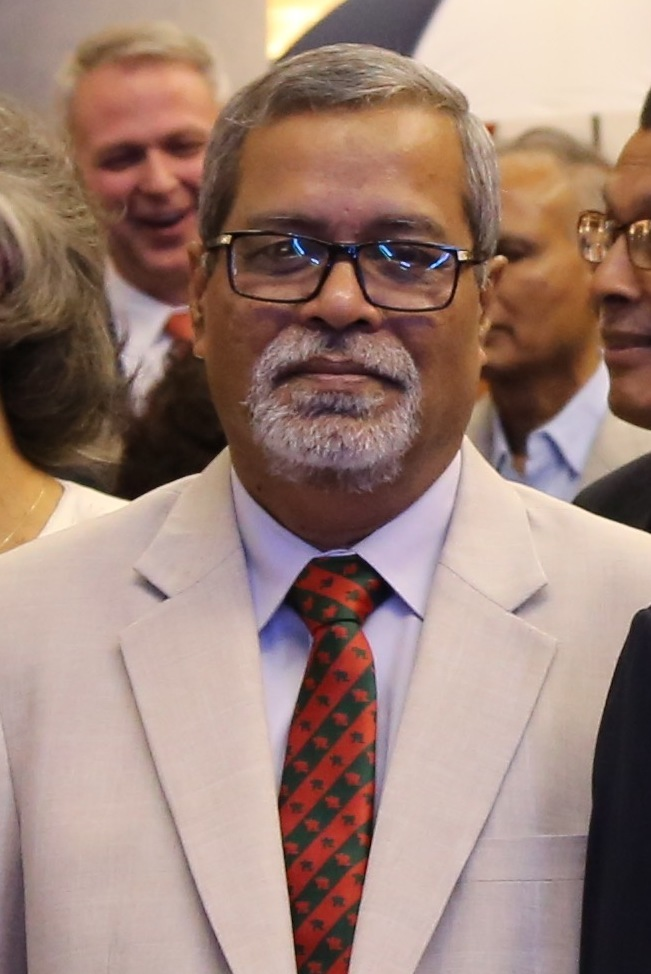
KM Nurul Huda, the chief election commissioner during 2017–22

The list of "special speakers" include chief election commissioner (CEC) KM Nurul Huda, the four election commissioners Mahbub Talukdar, Rafiqul Islam, Shahadat Hossain Chowdhury, and Kabita Khanam, secretary Helal Uddin Ahmed, additional secretary Mokhlesur Rahman and two joint secretaries Abul Kasem and Kamrul Hasan.

According to the commission's secretariat records collected by Bangladesh's daily Prothom Alo, 9 ‘special speakers’ delivered talks in 520 places of the country in just a matter of 18 days, from 7 to 24 December 2018. According to the records and the documents each ‘special speaker’ had to speak at 14 different places on a single day in-person which is nearly impossible for them.

Former election commissioner M Sakhawat Hossain said:

There has never been such costly training in the history of the election commission. In our time, the CEC, other commissioners and I spoke at training programs all over the country, but we didn’t take any allowance for this. The secretary too spoke, but took no payment either. That was the norm. What has taken place this time is blatant mismanagement and irregularity. Those involved must take responsibility for their actions.

=== Recruitment without monetary transparency ===
In November 2019, the election commissioner Mahbub Talukdar made an allegation against his colleagues of misappropriating 40.8 million BDT during the recruitment of staff for the election commission against 339 vacant posts. According to commissioner Mahbub, a huge amount of money was given to a faculty of the University of Dhaka which was approved by the CEC KM Nurul Huda but there were no records whatsoever of how many examiners were paid how much money. He further claimed that the election commission was kept in dark about the examination, the recruitment committee did not know the details of the payment and the evaluation of the examinees was under serious question.

== Citizen's letter to the President ==
Forty-two eminent citizens requested president Abdul Hamid to constitute a Supreme Judicial Council inquiry into corruption allegations against the chief election commissioner and election commissioners on December 19, 2020, and declared the sending of a letter with details over a virtual conference.

The letter stated:

You [president] are aware that Article 96(3) of the constitution of Bangladesh provides for the constitution of the Supreme Judicial Council for the removal of Judges. According to Article 96(5) of the constitution, "Where, upon any information received from the Council or from any other source, the President has reason to apprehend that a Judge may have been guilty of gross misconduct. The President may direct the Council to inquire into the matter and report its finding.

You [president] are also aware that Article 118 of our Constitution provides for the constitution of the Election Commission. According to Article 118(5), "Subject to the provisions of any law made by parliament, the conditions of service of election commissioners shall be such as the president may, by order, determine: Provided that an election commissioner shall not be removed from his office except in the like manner and on the like grounds as a Judge of the Supreme Court.

Among the signatories, there were: Professor emeritus Serajul Islam Choudhury, former caretaker government advisers M Hafizuddin Khan, Akbar Ali Khan, Sultana Kamal and Rasheda K Chowdhury, human rights activists Hameeda Hossain, Khushi Kabir and Nur Khan Liton, former cabinet secretary Ali Imam Mazumder, former Chittagong University professor Muinul Islam, Central Women's University vice-chancellor Parween Hassan, SHUJAN secretary Dr. Badiul Alam Majumdar, Transparency International Bangladesh executive director Dr. Iftekharuzzaman, former Dhaka University professors CR Abrar, Ahmed Kamal, and Akmal Hossain, local government expert Tofail Ahmed, Supreme Court lawyers ZI Khan Panna, Shahdeen Malik, Sara Hossain, Syeda Rizwana Hasan and Jyotirmoy Barua, photographer Shahidul Alam, Jahangirnagar University professor Anu Muhammad, former Jahangirnagar University professor Rahnuma Ahmed, economist Ahsan H Mansur, Bangladesh Protibondhi Foundation director Naila Zaman Khan, Shadhona artistic director professor Lubna Marium, former secretary Abdul Latif Mandal, Association for Land Reform and Development executive director Shamsul Huda and Dhaka University professors Asif Nazrul, Gitiara Nasreen, Robaet Ferdous, and Shahnaz Huda.
