= Syed Sultan Uddin Ahmed =

Syed Sultan Uddin Ahmed is a Bangladeshi activist and chairman of the Labor Reform Commission of the Yunus ministry. He is the executive director of the Bangladesh Institute of Labour Studies. He is a workers rights specialist for the International Labour Organization. He was the coordinator of the Domestic Workers' Rights Network, affiliated with the International Domestic Workers Federation.

== Career ==
Ahmed was the Assistant Executive Director of the Bangladesh Institute of Labour Studies in May 2014. He accused law enforcement agencies of killing people extrajudicially in anti-terrorism operations after the 2016 Dhaka attack in a statement. The statement was signed by Afsan Chowdhury, Asif Nazrul, Anish Barua, Bina D'Costa, Chowdhury Rafiqul Abrar, Farida Akhter, Faustina Pereira, Firdous Azim, Jyotirmoy Barua, Kamrun Nahar, Lubna Marium, Md. Nur Khan Liton, Perween Hasan, Rahnuma Ahmed, Razia Quadir, Safia Azim, Shahdeen Malik, Shahidul Alam, Shahnaz Huda, Shapan Adnan, Sara Hossain, Tofail Ahmed, Zafrullah Chowdhury, and Zakir Hossain. He worked with the survivors of the Rana Plaza collapse. He was a member of the Rana Plaza Coordination Committee led by the International Labour Organization.

Ahmed said that the RMG sector reduced workers by .8 million through automation in 2018. He called for a deputation of magistrates to the Department of Inspection for Factories and Establishments to improve safety in garment factories. He wrote an opinion piece in The Daily Star calling on the state (Bangladesh) to protect workers rights. In 2023, Ahmed was based in New Delhi working for the International Labour Organization.

In April 2024, Ahmed met with a team of the United States Trade Representative for South and Central Asia, United States ambassador to Bangladesh Peter Haas, and Commerce Secretary Tapan Kanti Ghosh to finalize a plan to reform the labour market of Bangladesh.

On 17 November 2024, Ahmed was made chairman of the Labor Reform Commission by the Muhmmad Yunus led interim government formed after the fall of the Sheikh Hasina led Awami League government. One of ten reform commissions formed by the interim government.

== See also ==
- Kalpona Akter
