= Tasneem Arefa Siddiqui =

Bangladeshi professor of political science

- Education: University of Dhaka; Griffith University
- Spouse: Chowdhury Rafiqul Abrar
- Parents: Ashraf Siddiqui (father); Syeda Siddiqui (mother)

Tasneem Arefa Siddiqui is a Bangladeshi academic and professor of Political Science at the University of Dhaka. She is known for pioneering work on migrant research in the 1990s in Bangladesh. She is the chairwoman of the Department of Political Science at the University of Dhaka and chairperson of Refugee and Migratory Movements Research Unit.

Siddiqui is a trustee board member of Transparency International Bangladesh.

== Early life ==
Siddiqui did her bachelor's degree and masters in social science at the University of Dhaka in 1980 and 1981 respectively. She did her PhD at Griffith University in 1992. Her siblings are Sayeed Siddiqui, Nahid Alam, Rifat Ahmed, and Riyad Siddiqui.

== Career ==
Siddiqui joined the University of Dhaka as a lecturer in 1984 and was promoted to assistant professor in 1991.

On 27 March 1995, Siddiqui was promoted to associate professor. She founded the Refugee and Migratory Movements Research Unit in 1995 along with Chowdhury Rafiqul Abrar, Shahdeen Malik, Sumaiya Khair, and Yasmin Ali Haque. She published Transcending Boundaries: Labor Migration of Women from Bangladesh in 2001. She was promoted to full professor in 2005.

Siddiqui was part of the committee that drafted Overseas Employment and Migration Act, 2013. She was a visiting professor at the Winston-Salem State University.

In March 2022, Siddiqui was invited to attend a consultation session with the Election Commission and academics but did not attend.

In October 2023, Siddiqui was elected general secretary of Transparency International Bangladesh. In August 2024, she was included in a committee led by Debapriya Bhattacharya, created under orders of chief advisor of interim government of Bangladesh Dr Muhammad Yunus, to write a white paper report on the economy of Bangladesh.

== Personal life ==
Tasneem is married to Chowdhury Rafiqul Abrar, a retired professor of international relations of the University of Dhaka and human rights activist.
