= Hannan Majid =

British documentary filmmaker

- হান্নান মাঝিদ
- Born: Bradford, West Yorkshire, England
- Education: Northern Film School
- Occupation: Documentary filmmaker
- Years active: 2005–present
- Organization: Rainbow Collective
- Website: rainbowcollective.co.uk

Hannan Majid (Bengali: হান্নান মাঝিদ) is a British documentary filmmaker.

== Early life ==
Hannan Majid's parents are originally from Dhaka, but they immigrated to Bradford, West Yorkshire (England), where Majid was born. He graduated from the Northern Film School in Leeds in 2004 with a Bachelor of Arts degree in moving images and film production.

== Rainbow Collective ==
Rainbow Collective
- Industry: Film
- Founded: 2006
- Founder: Hannan Majid; Richard York
- Headquarters: London, UK
- Key people: Hannan Majid; Richard York
- Products: Documentary films
- Website: rainbowcollective.co.uk

In 2006, Majid founded Rainbow Collective, a documentary film production company based in London, with Richard York. The company specialises in creating documentaries highlighting human and children's rights issues.

Majid has filmed, directed and produced documentaries in South Africa, Bangladesh, Iraq and the UK, and has won awards in Dubai, France and the Czech Republic. They have collaborated with TRAID (Textiles Recycling for Aid and International Development), War On Want, Amnesty International, The Consortium For Street Children, Labour Behind the Label, The Childhood Trust, Campaign Against Arms Trade, British Red Cross, Roundhouse Theatre, University of the Arts, SOAS and International Labor Rights Forum. Their films have been exhibited at film festivals, including Abu Dhabi, Cambridge, Bite The Mango, Cape Town, Durban, East End, Leeds International, and AlJazeera International Documentary.

The Rainbow Collective's 30-minute documentary filmTears in the Fabric focused on one family in the aftermath of the 2013 Savar building collapse. It premiered at Regent's University London in 2014.

In partnership with TRAID, "they have made a series of citizen journalist films with Cambodian garment workers" that Lucy Siegle, writing in The Guardian in 2017, considered "well worth a watch".

In August 2017, they became members of DIGNItex, a platform for defending decent jobs in the garment industry.

== Filmography ==
Year	Title	Credit
2006	AmaZulu: The Children of Heaven	Director, cinematographer
2006	Bafana	Director
2009	Baghdad Holiday	Director
2010	Voices from the Camps	Director
2010	The Machinists	Director, cinematographer, editor
2012	Not Ok Here, Not Ok Anywhere	Director, cinematographer
2014	Tears in the Fabric	Director, producer
2014	Mass E Bhat	Director
2025	To Kill a War Machine	Director, editor

== See also ==
- British Bangladeshi
- List of British Bangladeshis
