= Tanim Hussain Shawon =

Bangladeshi lawyer

Tanim Hussain Shawon is a Bangladeshi lawyer and member of the Judicial Reform Commission of the Muhammad Yunus led Interim government. He is a partner at Dr. Kamal Hossain and Associates.

== Early life ==
Shawon completed his bachelor's and master's in law at the University of Dhaka in 2002 and 2003 respectively. He completed a second law degree at the University of London. He was called to the Inner Temple.

== Career ==
Shawon joined the Bangladesh Bar Council in 2003. He joined Dr. Kamal Hossain and Associates law firm in 2007. From 2008 to 2009, he worked at Eversheds LLP in Newcastle-upon-Tyne. He started to practice in the High Court Division in 2008.

He was an active member of the legal team that defended the Nobel Peace Laureate, Professor Muhammad Yunus, who faced various legal issues since 2011 as he was being targeted by the Hasina government.

Shawon worked with Dr Kamal Hossain in representing Asif Nazrul, who was forced to stand in court by AHM Shamsuddin Choudhury Manik and Justice Jahangir Hossain Selim in 2012. Asif Nazrul was sued over comments he made about the next government to come to power in Bangladesh. He represented victims of the Tampaco Foils Ltd. factory fire.

In August 2018, Shawon and Jyotirmoy Barua represented Rehnuma Ahmed in a petition to send her husband, photographer Shahidul Alam who had been jailed for making comments critical of the government, to hospital for medical treatment. He wrote an opinion piece in the Dhaka Tribune praising Dr. Kamal Hossain ahead of the 2018 general election.

Shawon and Sharif Bhuiyan filed a review petition against the 13th amendment to the constitution of Bangladesh which removed the caretaker government system on behalf of Badiul Alam Majumdar, M Hafizuddin Khan, Md Jobirul Hoque Bhuiyan, Tofail Ahmed, and Zahrah Rahman. Following the fall of the Sheikh Hasina led Awami League government, he was made a member of the Judicial Reform Commission. The Commission had 29 meetings and 37 consultations with stakeholders to prepare its report. In November, he filed a contempt of court petition against Jugantor over an article by Mohammad Abdus Salam.
