= Sharif Bhuiyan =

Sharif Bhuiyan is a Bangladeshi lawyer and member of the Constitutional Reform Commission of the Yunus ministry led by Muhammad Yunus. He is the Deputy Head of Chambers at Dr. Kamal Hossain and Associates. He is a former lawyer of Grameenphone.

== Early life ==
Bhuiyan did his bachelor's and master's in law at the University of Dhaka. He did his PhD in law at the University of Cambridge.

== Career ==
Bhuiyan became a member of Bangladesh Bar Council in 1997. He joined the University of Dhaka as a lecturer in 2000.

In 2006, Bhuiyan was a Visiting Fellow at the Lauterpacht Centre for International Law at the University of Cambridge. From 2006 to 2008, he taught law at BRAC University. He is a member of the Dhaka Bar Association and the Bangladesh Supreme Court Bar Association. From 2007 to 2014, he was an honorary director of the South Asian Institute of Advanced Legal and Human Rights Studies. He represented Bangladesh at the International Centre for Settlement of Investment Disputes along with Dr. Kamal Hossain in a case filed by Chevron. He was one of the editors of the 2014 book International Law and Developing Countries: Essays in Honour of Kamal Hossain.

Bhuiyan started to practice in the Appellate Division of the Bangladesh Supreme Court in 2015. He represented photographer Shahidul Alam in 2018 after he was charged under the Information and Communication Technology Act, 2006. In 2019, he represented Grameenphone one behalf of whom he sent a legal notice to the President of Bangladesh challenging a penalty by Bangladesh Telecommunication Regulatory Commission. In 2023, he was identified as one of the top 20 lawyers in Bangladesh by Asia Law. He has worked as a consultant of the World Bank.

In 2024, Bhuiyan was recognized as a senior lawyer. He is the Deputy Head of Chambers at Dr. Kamal Hossain and Associates, founded by Dr Kamal Hossain who is the writer of the Constitution of Bangladesh. On 27 August, he filed a petition with the Appellate Division challenging the scrapping of the Caretaker government system along with Barrister Tanim Hussain Shawon on behalf of Badiul Alam Majumdar, M Hafizuddin Khan, Md Jobirul Hoque Bhuiyan, Tofail Ahmed, and Zahrah Rahman. The petition challenged the 15th amendment to the constitution of Bangladesh. He secured a verdict which scrapped the 15th amendment and restored the caretaker government system. He was made a member of the Constitutional Reform Commission in October. He admitted the new government did not have a mandate for change the constitution as it was not an elected government.
