= Traid =

Traid may refer to:

- Traid (charity), previously "Textile Recycling for Aid and International Development", a UK charity
- José Luis García Traid (1936–1990), Spanish footballer and manager

== See also ==
- Traíd, a municipality located in the province of Guadalajara, Castile-La Mancha, Spain
