= AmaZulu: The Children of Heaven =

- Directed by: Hannan Majid; Richard York
- Produced by: Denise York
- Cinematography: Nico Millar; Hannan Majid
- Edited by: Elisa Cherene Holliday
- Music by: Hopewell Mpabanga
- Production companies: Rainbow Collective; The Northern Film Foundation; Leeds Metropolitan University
- Release date: 2006
- Running time: 92 minutes
- Country: United Kingdom
- Languages: Zulu; English
- Budget: £80,000

AmaZulu: The Children of Heaven is a 2006 British documentary film directed by Hannan Majid and Richard York. The film follows seven teenagers in a township in Umlazi as they come together to learn under the leadership of headmaster, Mr. Mtshali at Velabahleke High School.

== Summary ==
The film show life in the South African township of Durban's Umlazi through seven pupils of Velabahleke High School, Velabahleke ("Come with a Smile"), as they come together under their headmaster Mr Mtshali.

The aspirations and everyday lives of the pupils, both in and out of school, interweave to form a story of a generation striving to transcend their disadvantaged backgrounds, hope and dream of a new purpose-driven life, and aspire to achieve their goals.

== Appearances ==
- Cindy Cele
- Nonhlanhla Mtshali
- Zakhele Khuzwayo
- Thembi Mlabo
- Nkosinathi Mgiyako
- Nkosinathi Hadebe
- Sbonelo Dladla
- Mbongeni Mtshali

== Development ==
AmaZulu was financed by The Northern Film Foundation and Leeds Metropolitan University. The film's directors, Richard York and Hannan Majid, said that the purpose of the film was "To raise awareness and help in the eradication of social injustice across the world through the power of film."

== Release ==
AmaZulu premiered at the Durban International Film Festival in June 2006. It also participated at the Cape Town International Film Festival 2006, Closing Film Cambridge African Film Festival 2006, Zithengi Film Market 2006, Aljazeera International Documentary Film Festival 2007, SABC Africa on Screen Film Festival 2007, Medimed 2007 and Mosaiques International Film Festival 2010.

The South African government screened the film to teachers around the country and it was also shown in the Tower Hamlets borough in London.

== Reception ==
Debbie Myburg of The South African described AmaZulu as "a moving and compelling narrative, an interweaving of different stories showing a generation striving to achieve what could be theirs in a new South Africa." Rasha Mohammad of OnIslam said, "With their seven young heroes, they render through the screen how children are struggling there, surrounded by poverty and apartheid, facing a world of madness where words, ideas, and policies are twisted so they do not know what the truth actually is."

Durban International Film Festival said, "Amazulu is a powerful and inspiring narrative".

== Awards and nominations ==
Year	Award	Category	Result
2008	Nantes British Film Festival	Best Film	Won

== See also ==
- Bafana
- Education in South Africa
