= Machinist (disambiguation) =

A machinist is a tradesperson or trained professional.

Machinist or Machinists may also refer to:

- Peter Machinist, American historian
- The Machinist, 2004 psychological thriller film
- The Machinists, 2012 British documentary film
