= Bangladesh Institute of Labour Studies =

Research institute for labour matters in Bangladesh

BILS
- Bangladesh Institute of Labour Studies
- Established: 1995
- Type: Think tank
- Location(s): Dhaka, Bangladesh
- Chairman: Md. Habibur Rahman Shiraz
- Secretary General: Nazrul Islam Khan
- Executive Director: Syed Sultan Uddin Ahmed
- Publication: Labour
- Affiliations: BGWUC
- Website: bilsbd.org

The Bangladesh Institute of Labour Studies (BILS) is a think tank for trade union activity and other labour matters in Bangladesh. It was founded in 1995 to support the building of trade unions and their activities and to promote trade union causes within government and society. Today, 12 Bangladeshi trade union federations are affiliated with BILS. Unlike many other labour organisations in Bangladesh, the institute is not affiliated with any political party. The institute publishes a biannual journal, Labour.

== Organisation ==
The main office of BILS is in Dhaka. The institute also has a "Labour Resources & Support Centre" in Chittagong and another office in Manikganj.

BILS frequently cooperates with the German social democratic Friedrich Ebert Foundation and The Daily Star.

The work of BILS has been described by academics as having "provided significant boosts to the efforts of resource-starved Bangladesh unions."

Chairpersons and Secretaries General
Position	Name	Organisation
Chairman	Habibur Rahman Shiraz	-
Vice Chairman	Md. Mojibur Rahman Bhuiyan	BMSF
Vice Chairman	Shirin Akhter	JASAD
Vice Chairman	Anwar Hossain	BJSD
Vice Chairman	Amirul Haque Amin	NGWF
Secretary General	Nazrul Islam Khan	-
Jt. Secretary General	Md. Serajul Islam	BJSL

== History ==
BILS was founded in 1995.

In April 2006, BILS initiated meetings between trade unions that resulted in a ten-point charter of demands for the improvement of garment workers' labour conditions, especially a raise of the minimum wage. This charter led to the creation of the Minimum Wages Board and the 7-grade minimum wage structure for garment workers still in use today.

Also in 2006, BILS together with trade unions, human rights organisations and NGOs formed the Domestic Workers' Rights Network in order to improve the working conditions of domestic workers in Bangladesh. In 2010, the alliance drafted a policy proposal for the protection of domestic workers that was adopted by Bangladesh's government in 2015.

Following the 2013 Dhaka garment factory collapse, BILS joined the Rana Plaza Coordination Committee that led the distribution of payments to the families of those killed and injured by the disaster.

In 2017, BILS conducted a study that found Bangladesh factories did not follow ILO standards for minimum work hours and workplace safety. The survey found that instead of eight hours a day, workers in Bangladesh on average work 12 hours a day. Nearly half of the surveyed transport workers worked for more than 15 hours a day. In that year, the institute together with the Friedrich Ebert Foundation also conducted a three-month training course on labour policy and workers' rights for 16 young trade union leaders.

In 2018, BILS called for the abolishment of the regulation that 20 percent of a factory's workers were needed to form a union. In the same year, the institute conducted a study that documented lacking compliance with labour laws in Bangladesh's informal sector. The institute, together with Sramik Karmachari Oikya Parishad and the National Workers Federation, in that year also published 16 demands to improve the working conditions of rickshaw pullers.

During the economic crisis caused by the COVID-19 pandemic, BILS called for the establishment of a national database of unemployed workers to help with their protection.
