= Syed Humayun Kabir =

Bangladeshi businessman

- সৈয়দ হুমায়ুন কবির
- Born: 1 September 1931
- Died: 2 July 2015 (aged 83); Dhaka, Bangladesh
- Education: University of Dhaka; University of Strathclyde
- Occupations: Entrepreneur; philanthropist
- Known for: Chairman of BRAC, Renata Limited and Transparency International Bangladesh
- Spouse: Sajida Fahmi
- Children: Kaiser; Farisa; Fizza
- Parents: Syed Golam Kabir (father); Sara Begum (mother)
- Relatives: Rehman Sobhan (cousin); Sara Zaker (niece)

Syed Humayun Kabir (1 September 1931 – 2 July 2015) was a Bangladeshi businessman. He was the founder and chairman of Bangladesh Pfizer Limited (later Renata Limited) and SAJIDA Foundation. He was the longest serving chairperson of BRAC for 19 years in the 1980s and 90s.

== Background ==
Syed Humayun Kabir was born in 1931 to Sara Begum (d. 1935) and Syed Golam Kabir. Golam was a member of Bengal Civil Service and served as the agriculture secretary in the East Pakistan government, and later on as a member of the National Commission on Agriculture set up in 1959. Humayun was the second among his five children, Syed Ali Kabir, Kaniz Zohra, Kaniz Alia Amin, and Kaniz Fatema.

Humayun grew up in Calcutta and started his education at Little Flower's Day School. Humayun graduated in chemistry from the University of Dhaka and studied– pharmacology at the University of Strathclyde, Glasgow.

== Career ==
Kabir started his career in 1957 as an assistant manager at the Rashidpur Tea Estate in Sylhet. In 1963, he moved to Dhaka after he took the position of the plant manager of Pfizer in East Pakistan. After the independence of Bangladesh, he became the managing director of Pfizer, Bangladesh. He went on to take the role of CEO and after Pfizer sold the stake on their local enterprise to Kabir, it was reconstituted by him into a Bangladeshi company, Renata Limited.

Kabir served as an elected president of Metropolitan Chamber of Commerce and Industry, Dhaka in 1979-1980 and again, in 1984–1985. He became the chairperson of BRAC in 1982 and remained in the position for 19 years. He became the founding president of the American Bangladesh Economic Forum (ABEF) in 1988, which subsequently became American Chamber of Commerce in Bangladesh (AmCham) in 1996.

In 1993, Kabir created SAJIDA Foundation, a charitable organization in the name of his wife, as a gift of their 25th wedding anniversary. He donated 51 percent of his shares of Renata Pharmaceuticals to the foundation.

Kabir was a founding member and the chairman of the board of trustees of Transparency International Bangladesh.

Kabir served as chairman and president of Bangladesh Employers Association, Foreign Investors' Chamber of Commerce and Industries, American-Bangladesh Economic Forum.. He was also board members of several banks, an insurance company and a trustee of the Centre for Policy Dialogue (CPD).

== Family ==
Syed Humayun Kabir married Sajida Fahmi in c. 1968. She was a lecturer of architecture at Bangladesh University of Engineering and Technology (BUET) and later served as a member of boards of several organizations including National Association of Sports for Persons with Intellectual Disability (NASPD), Bangladesh Olympic Association, Dhaka Ahsania Mission and Diabetic Association of Bangladesh. They had a son, Kaiser Kabir, who later became the CEO of Renata Limited and two daughters, Sajeda Farisa Kabir, a barrister, and Zahida Fizza Kabir, CEO of SAJIDA Foundation.

Economist Rehman Sobhan was Kabir's cousin and media personality Sara Zaker was his niece.

Kabir died on 7 July 2015 at the age of 83 at Apollo Hospital, Dhaka.
