= Dhania Chalk Mosque =

Mosque and archeological monument in Chapainawabganj, Bangladesh

- ধনিয়াচক মসজিদ
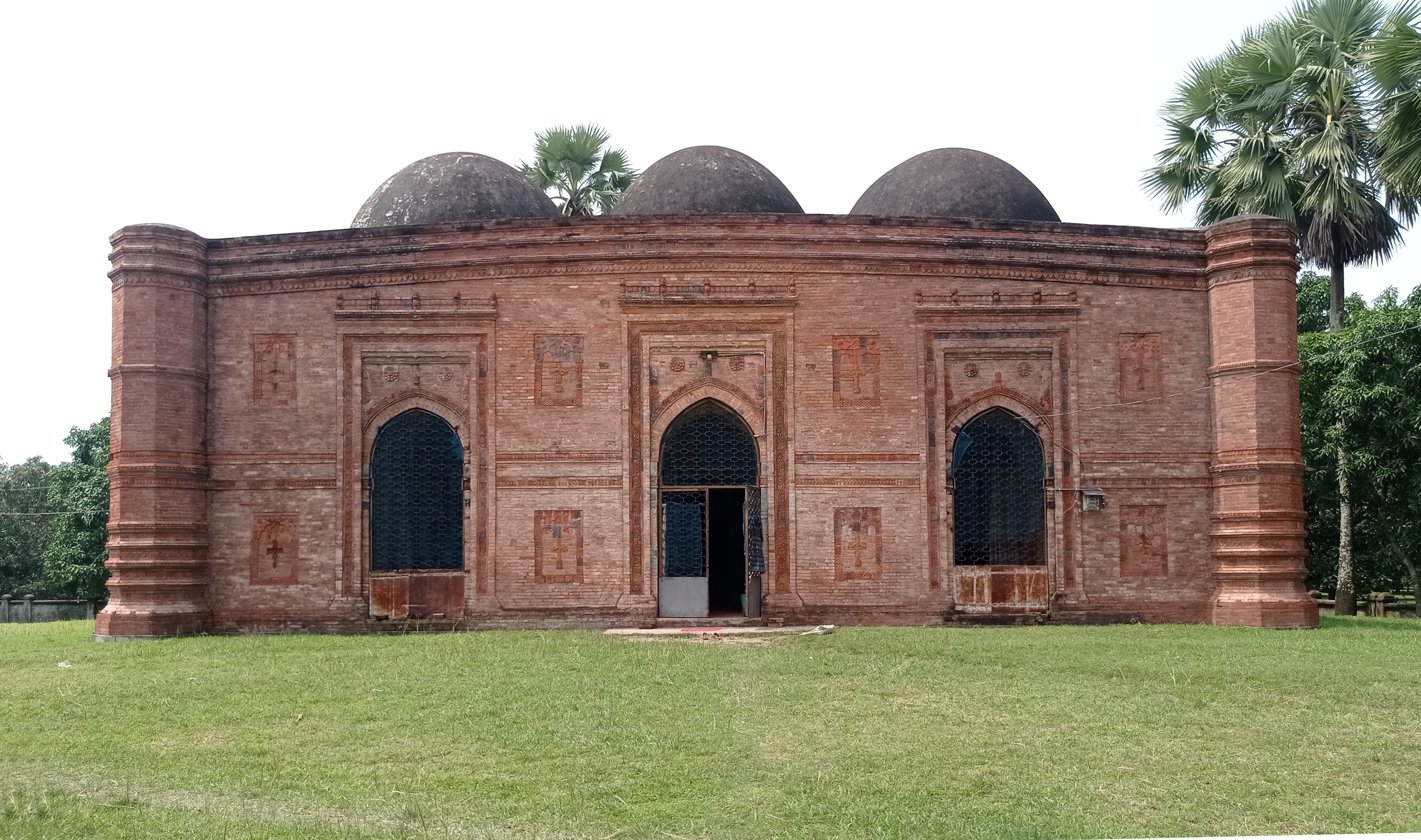
- Façade of the mosque

- Location within Bangladesh

Religion
- Affiliation: Islam
- Status: Active; Preserved

Location
- Location: Shahbajpur, Shibganj Upazila, Chapai Nawabganj District
- Country: Bangladesh
- Interactive map of Dhania Chalk Mosque
- Administration: Department of Archeology
- Coordinates: 24.832081°N 88.150382°E

Architecture
- Type: Mosque architecture
- Style: Bengal Sultanate
- Established: 15th century
- Completed: 2006

Specifications
- Length: 17.07 m (56.0 ft)
- Width: 11.13 m (36.5 ft)
- Interior area: 117.65 m^{2} (1,266.4 ft^{2})
- Dome: 6
- Materials: Brick, Stone

The Dhania Chalk Mosque (Note: Banglapedia and Perween Hasan spells it Dhunichawk while Abu Sayeed M Ahmed spells it Dhaniachak. Widely spelled as Dhania Chalk) (Bengali: ধনিয়াচক মসজিদ) is a historical Sultanate period mosque located in the southern suburb of the ancient city Gaur, presently in the village Shahbajpur under Shibganj Upazila of the Chapainawabganj District. The architectural style suggests that the building was likely constructed in the late fifteenth century. The mosque was reconstructed from ruins by Department of Archeology, now a protected archeological site.

== Architecture ==
The mosque, an oblong structure, measures approximately 13.4 by 8.78 m (44.0 by 28.8 ft) internally while 17.07 by 11.13 m (56.0 by 36.5 ft) externally and is surrounded by a brick wall about 1.94 m (6.4 ft) thick. Before restoration much of the mosque lied in ruins, with only sections of the qibla and northern walls standing. The eastern and southern walls, as well as the four octagonal corner turrets were also rebuilt from their foundations remain. The qibla wall contains three mihrab niches, the central one being larger and taller, featuring a pointed cusped arch with decorative finial. A projection on the exterior of the qibla wall aligns with the main mihrab niche.

Oversailing brick courses at the tops of the walls indicate that the structure was roofed with six domes supported by corbelled pendentives. The two central columns within the chamber feature square bases, octagonal shafts adorned with two rows of mouldings, and capitals decorated with crenellation. The engaged pilasters share a similar design. The arches sustaining the domes originate from the tops of the columns and the engaged pilasters.

== Gallery ==
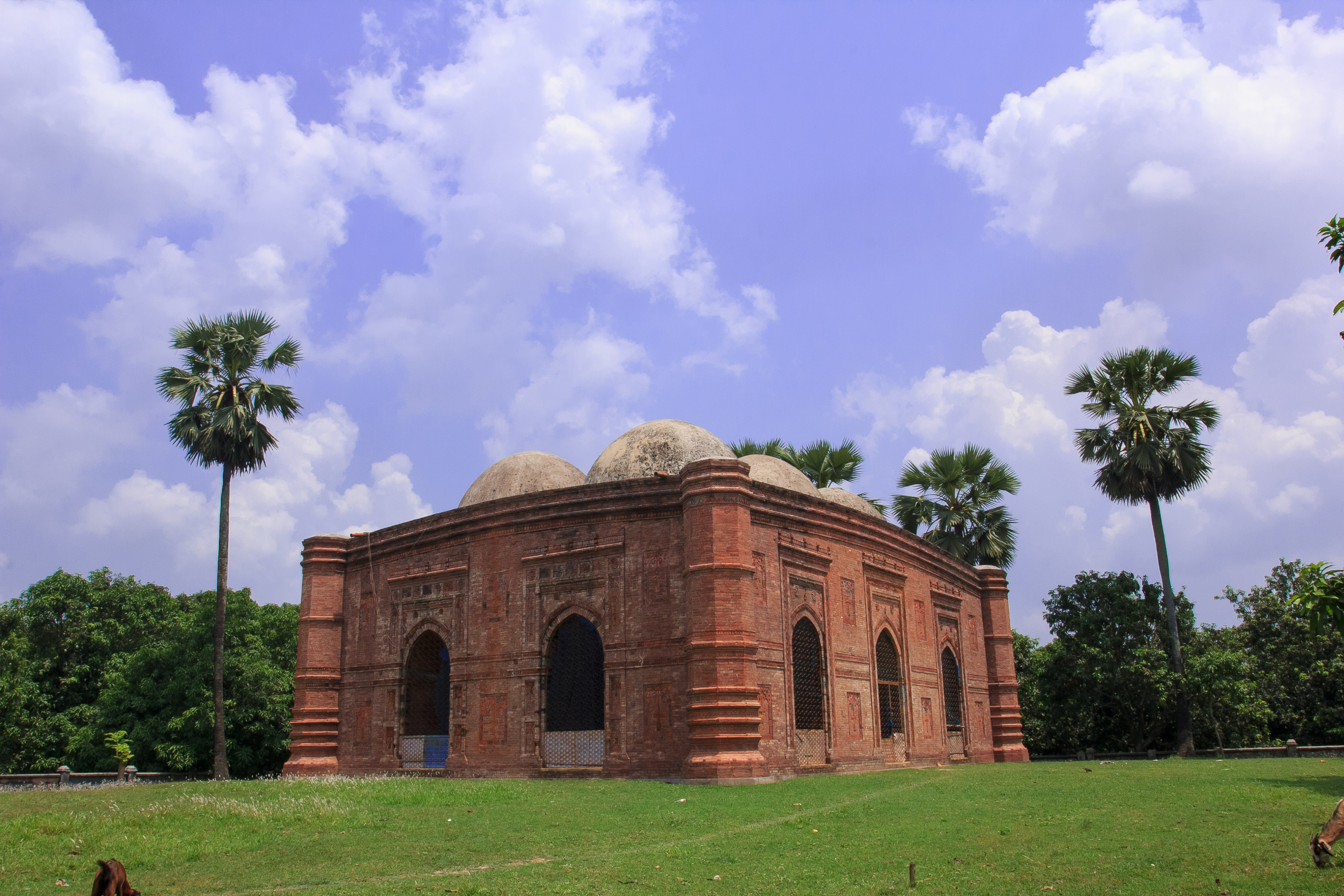
General view of the mosque

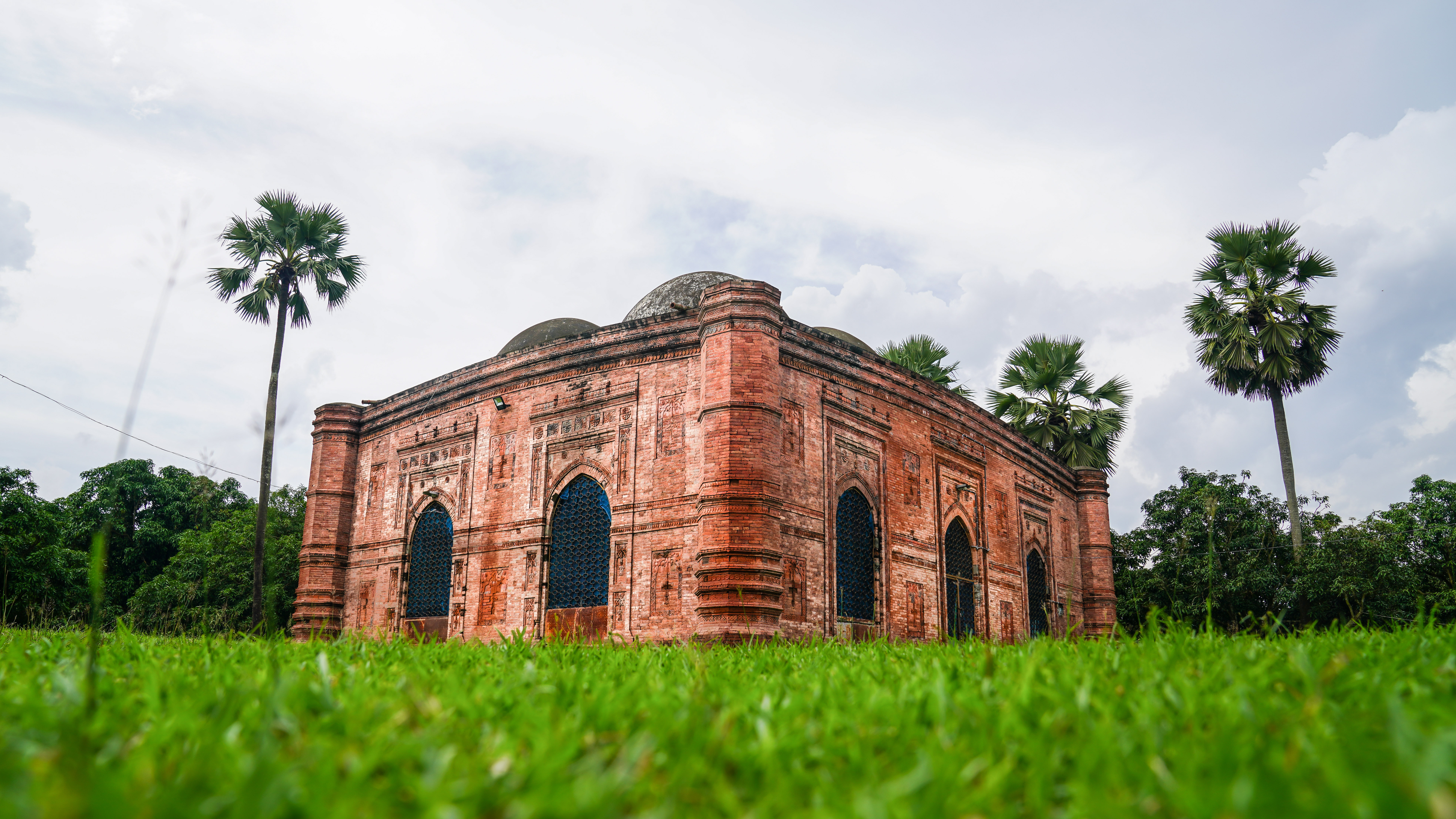
Diagonal view

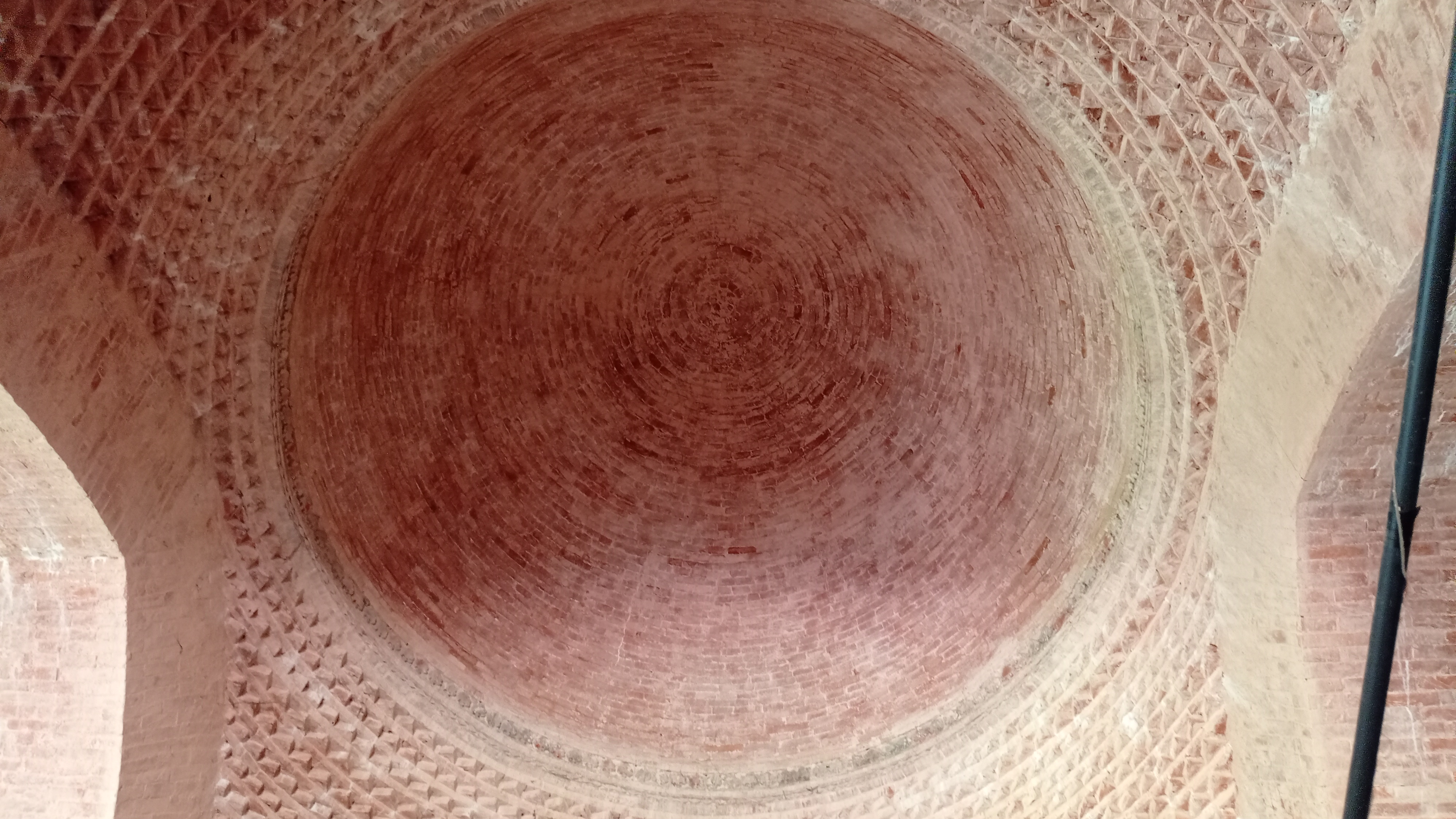
Dome interior

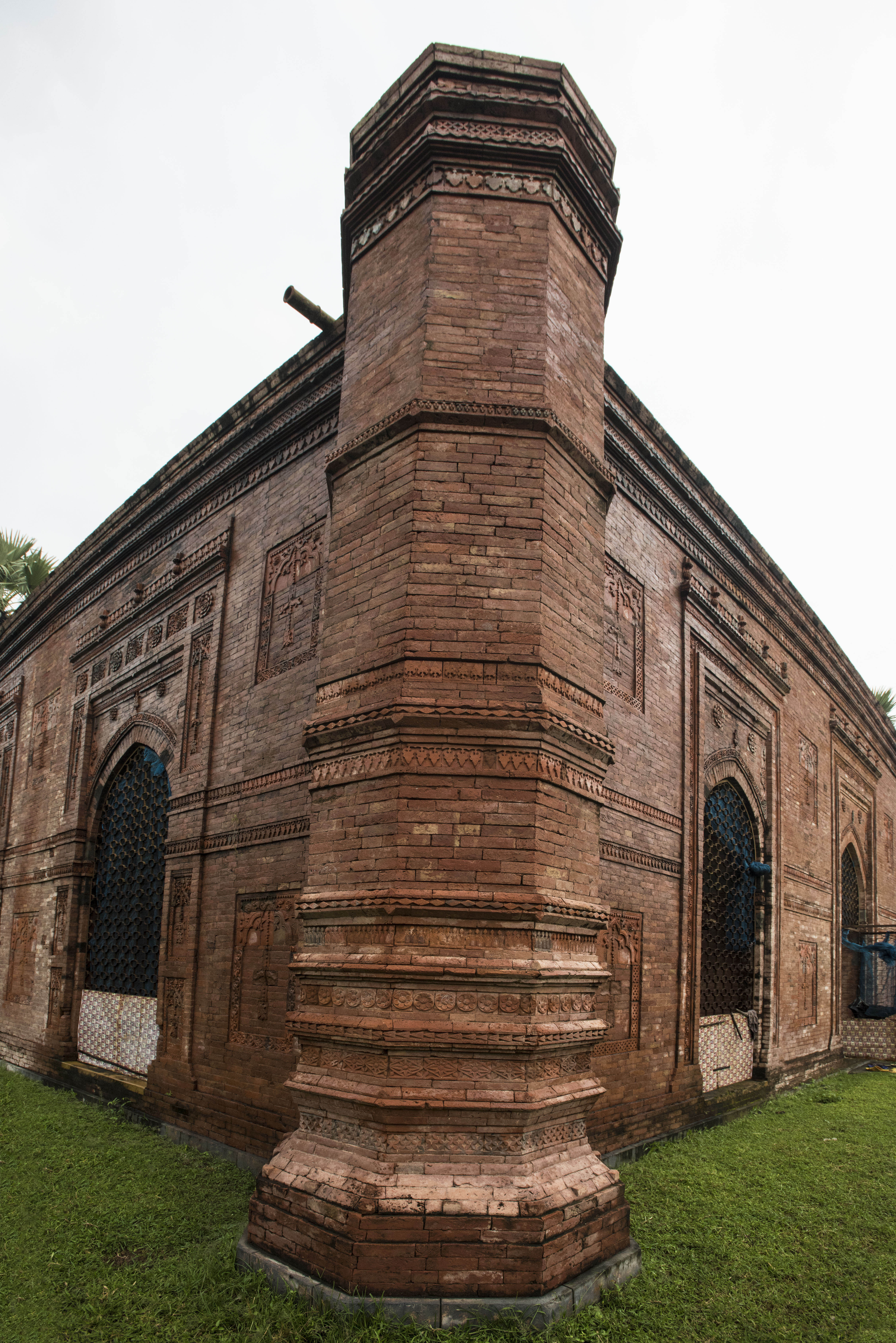
Corner turrets

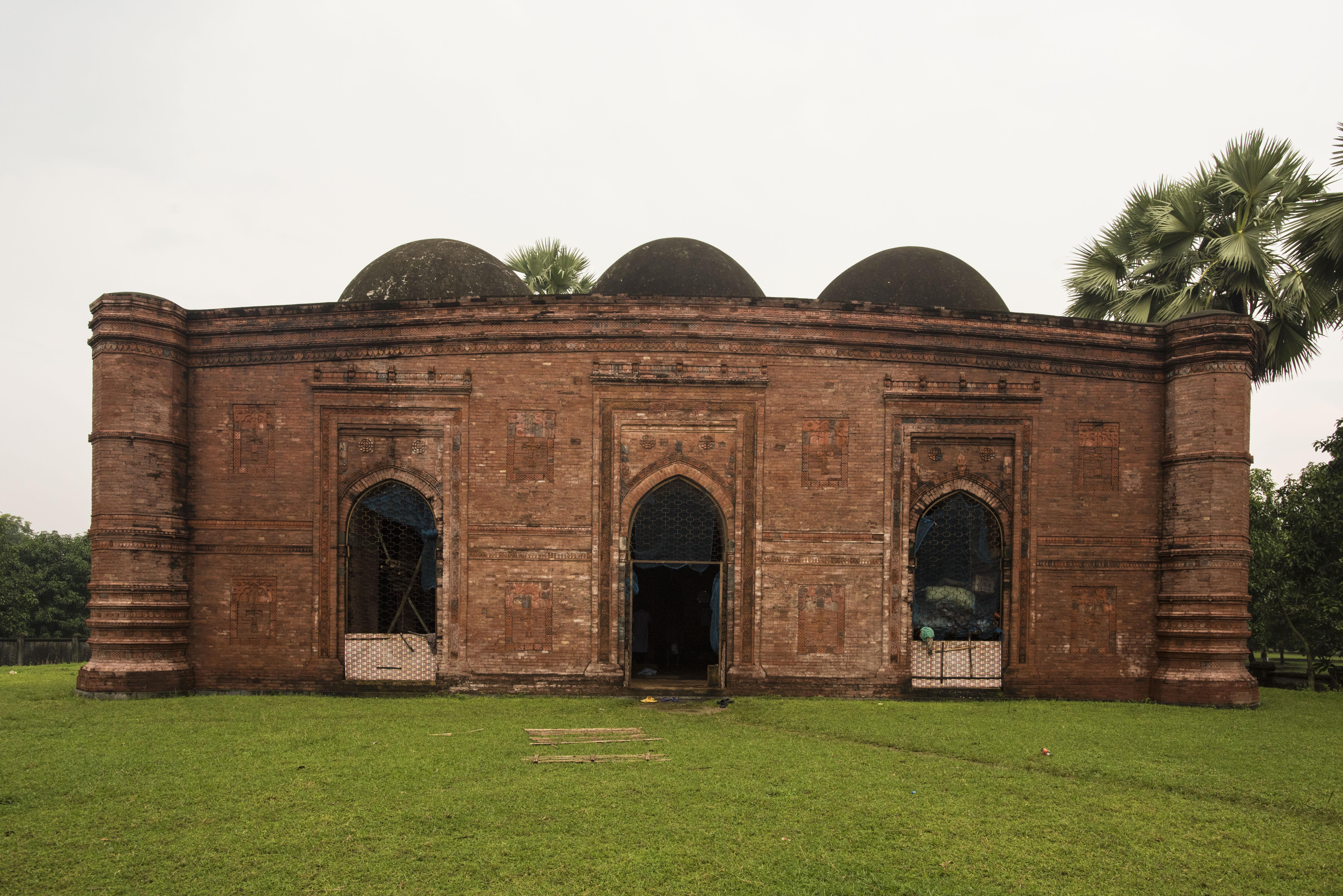
Three domes and three entrances at side of the mosque

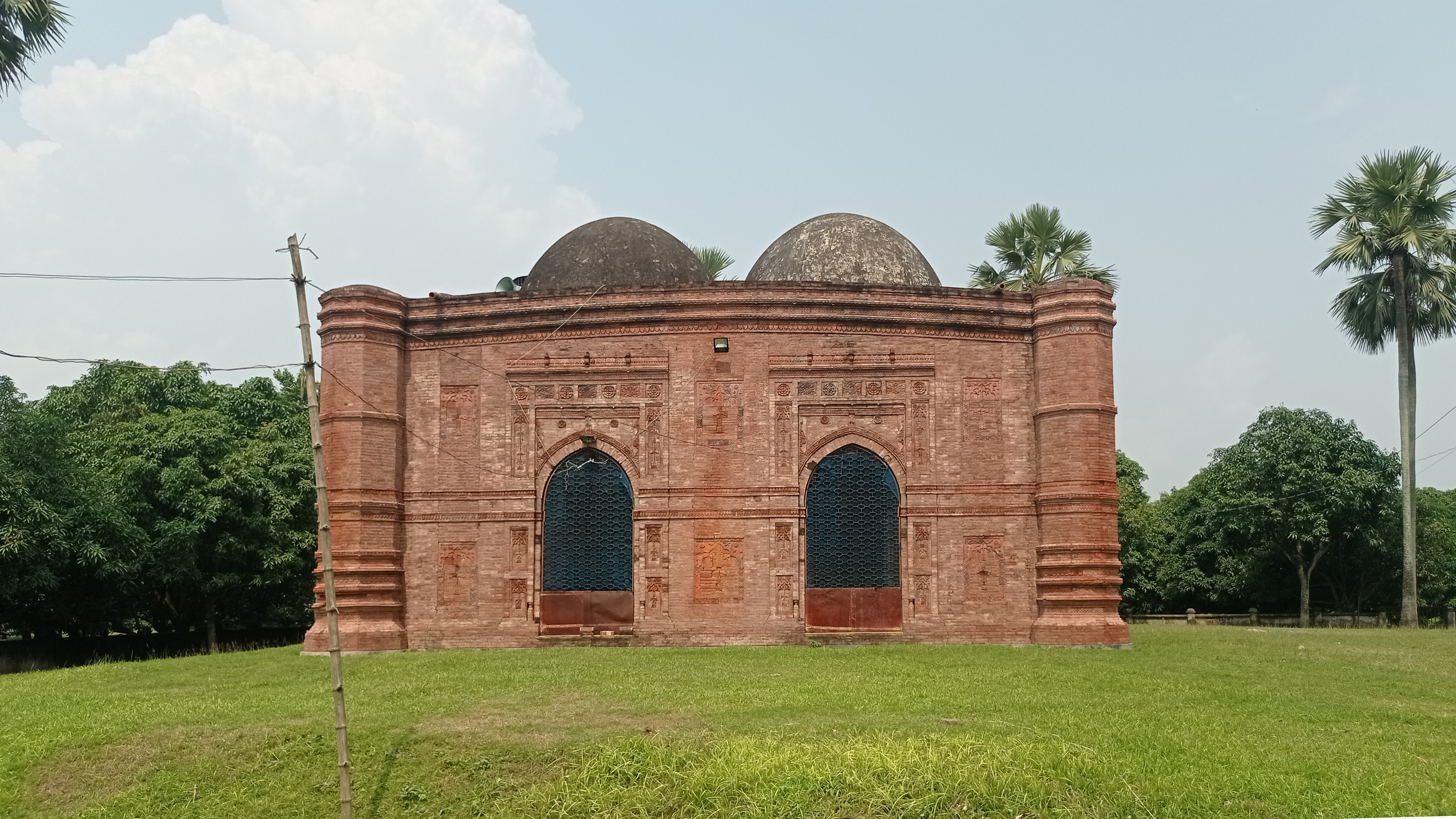
Side view featuring two entrances

== See also ==
- Darasbari Mosque
- List of mosques in Bangladesh
- List of archeological sites in Bangladesh

== Bibliography ==
- Ahmed, Abu Sayeed M. (2006). Mosque Architecture in Bangladesh. UNESCO Dhaka. ISBN 978-984-32-3469-8.
- Hasan, Perween (2007). Sultans and Mosques: The Early Muslim Architecture of Bangladesh. Bloomsbury Academic. ISBN 978-1-84511-381-0.
