= Refugee and Migratory Movements Research Unit =

Bangladesh research institute

- Formation: 1995
- Headquarters: Dhaka, Bangladesh
- Region served: Bangladesh
- Official language: Bengali
- Website: www.rmmru.org

Refugee and Migratory Movements Research Unit (Bengali: অভিবাসী আন্দোলন গবেষণা ইউনিট (রামরু)) is a research institute and think tank in Bangladesh that works with migrants and refugees. It is based out of the University of Dhaka.

Tasneem Arefa Siddiqui is the founding chairperson of Refugee and Migratory Movements Research Unit. Chowdhury Rafiqul Abrar, professor of international relations at the University of Dhaka, is the executive director.

== History ==
Refugee and Migratory Movements Research Unit was established in 1995 by Tasneem Siddiqui. The founding members of Refugee and Migratory Movements Research Unit are Chowdhury Rafiqul Abrar, Shahdeen Malik, Sumaiya Khair, and Yasmin Ali Haque. It has carried out 80 original research on refugee and migrants issues.

In 2015, the Refugee and Migratory Movements Research Unit hosted an intern from the University of Victoria as part of the CAPI's 2015 Crossing Borders Internship Program.

The Canadian development assistance funded a three-year research into successful intervention pathways for migration as adaptation carried out by Refugee and Migratory Movements Research Unit, International Centre for Integrated Mountain Development, University of Exeter, and the University of East Anglia. It published a research paper, The Social Cost of Migration on Left Behind Migrants’ Spouses and Children in Bangladesh, in partnership with the Swiss Agency for Development and Cooperation.

In 2021, Tasneem Siddiqui was a panelist on the Climate change and forced migration: a crisis in the making session of the World Forum for Democracy of Council of Europe. In 2022, it published he Deaths of Migrants in the Gulf with Vital Signs Partnership. It prepared the Draft National Strategy on Climate Change and Disaster following a request of the Ministry of Disaster Management and Relief.

The Wage Earners’ Welfare Board said 4261 Bangladeshi migrant workers died between July 2023 to June 2024 but Tasneem Siddiqui believed the number to be much higher. In 2023, Europe had the highest number of asylum seekers, 40,332 Bangladeshis, from Bangladesh on record. Chowdhury Rafiqul Abrar, executive director of Refugee and Migratory Movements Research Unit, said "We have experienced political unrest, repression, and a lack of personal security in our country. These could be major reasons for seeking international protection in EU countries".

In August 2024, the Chair of Refugee and Migratory Movements Research Unit Tasneem Siddiqui was appointed a member of an committee formed by the interim government of Bangladesh to write a white paper on the economy of Bangladesh. The committee would be led by Debapriya Bhattacharya.
