= Bangladesh–Uzbekistan relations =

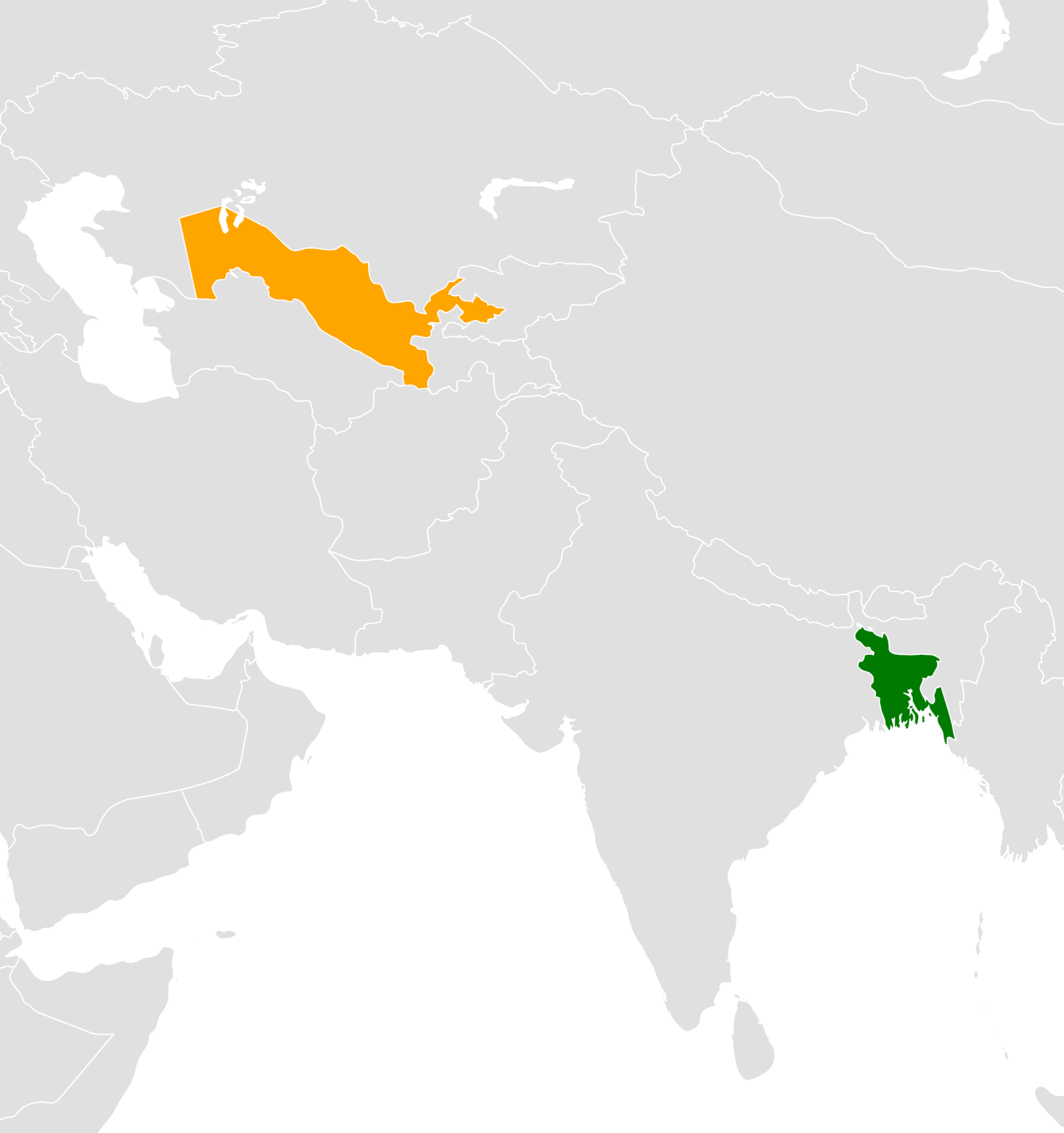

- Bangladesh: Uzbekistan

Diplomatic mission
- Embassy of Bangladesh, Tashkent: Embassy of Uzbekistan, New Delhi (accredited to Bangladesh)

Envoy
- Ambassador Mohammad Monirul Islam: Ambassador Sardor Rustambayev

Bangladesh–Uzbekistan relations are the bilateral relations between Bangladesh and Uzbekistan. The two countries established diplomatic relations on 15 October 1992. Both countries are members of the Non-Aligned Movement and the Organisation of Islamic Cooperation.

== History ==
Bangladesh and Uzbekistan signed an agreement on trade and economic cooperation in Dhaka on 14 February 1998. On 18 July 2000, the two countries signed a bilateral investment treaty, which entered into force on 24 January 2001.

On 11 April 2018, Bangladesh's State Minister for Foreign Affairs Shahriar Alam met Uzbek Foreign Minister Abdulaziz Kamilov in Tashkent. They discussed the resumption of direct flights between Dhaka and Tashkent, visa arrangements and the possibility of opening an Uzbek embassy in Dhaka.

First Foreign Office Consultations between Bangladesh and Uzbekistan were held in Tashkent on 14 March 2022. The delegations were led by Bangladesh's Foreign Secretary Masud Bin Momen and Uzbek Deputy Foreign Minister Furkat Sidikov. They discussed trade, investment, direct flights and visa arrangements.

On 29 July 2022, the third meeting of the Bangladesh-Uzbekistan Intergovernmental Commission on Trade and Economic Cooperation was held in Dhaka. Bangladesh's Commerce Minister Tipu Munshi and Uzbek Deputy Prime Minister Jamshid Khodjaev led the respective delegations. The meeting covered trade, investment, textiles, agriculture and pharmaceuticals.

On 18-19 May 2023, Uzbek Deputy Foreign Minister Bakhromjon Aloyev visited Dhaka for political consultations with Bangladesh's Ministry of Foreign Affairs. The discussions covered trade, investment, tourism and cooperation between the two countries' textile industries.

Further political consultations were held in Tashkent on 11 June 2024, led by Bangladesh's Foreign Secretary Masud Bin Momen and Uzbek First Deputy Foreign Minister Bakhromjon Aloyev. During the meeting, the Bangladesh Foreign Service Academy and the Diplomatic Academy of Uzbekistan's University of World Economy and Diplomacy signed a memorandum of cooperation.

On 11 November 2026, Bangladesh's Prime Minister Tarique Rahman met Uzbek President Shavkat Mirziyoyev on the sidelines of the 2026 United Nations Climate Change Conference in Antalya, Turkey. They discussed political dialogue, trade, industrial cooperation and regional issues.

== Economic relations ==
In January 2018, a 13-member Uzbek delegation led by First Deputy Minister of Economy Mubin Mirzaev met representatives of the Bangladesh Garment Manufacturers and Exporters Association (BGMEA) in Dhaka. They discussed trade and investment in the textile and garment industries, including the possibility of Bangladeshi investment in Uzbekistan.

In March 2025, Bangladesh's Ambassador to Uzbekistan, Mohammad Monirul Islam, met Uzbek Deputy Minister of Transport Choriyev Jasurbek Ergashevich in Tashkent. Bangladesh requested the signing of a proposed Air Services Agreement to restore direct flights between Dhaka and Tashkent. The Uzbek side said the agreement was still under consideration.

== Bilateral trade ==
According to the National Statistics Committee of Uzbekistan, bilateral trade between Bangladesh and Uzbekistan amounted to approximately US$63.52 million in 2025, compared with US$51.93 million in 2024.

In 2025, Bangladesh exported approximately US$56.54 million worth of goods to Uzbekistan and imported US$6.98 million from Uzbekistan.

== Cultural and educational relations ==
On 14 April 2025, the Bangladesh Embassy in Tashkent organised a Pahela Baishakh celebration and a seminar on tourism cooperation between Bangladesh and Uzbekistan. The event was attended by diplomats, university representatives and members of the Bangladeshi community in Uzbekistan.

On 6 November 2025, Bangladesh's Education Adviser Chowdhury Rafiqul Abrar met Uzbekistan's Minister of Higher Education, Science and Innovation, Qo‘ng‘irotboy Sharipov. The ministers discussed joint study programmes, research and teacher and student exchanges. According to the Uzbek ministry, Tashkent State University of Oriental Studies already had partnerships with Bangladeshi universities.

== Resident diplomatic missions ==
- Bangladesh has an embassy in Tashkent.
- Uzbekistan is accredited to Bangladesh from its embassy in New Delhi, India.

== See also ==
- Foreign relations of Bangladesh
- Foreign relations of Uzbekistan
