= Bangladesh Freedom Foundation =

Bangladeshi organisation

- Formation: 1997
- Headquarters: Dhaka, Bangladesh
- Region served: Bangladesh
- Official language: Bengali
- Website: freedomfound.org

Bangladesh Freedom Foundation (Bengali: বাংলাদেশ ফ্রিডম ফাউন্ডেশন) is an independent organization providing grants in Bangladesh to various organizations and funded by Ford Foundation. It carries our research on student perceptions of the education system in Bangladesh and has promoted science education.

Mahfuz Anam, editor of The Daily Star, is the chair and Muhammad Younus, chief advisor of Bangladesh, is the emeritus trustee of Bangladesh Freedom Foundation.

Md Morhsed Alam is the project director of Bangladesh Freedom Foundation.

== History ==
Bangladesh Freedom Foundation was established as a trust in 1997 and registered with the NGO Affairs Bureau in 1998. It is funded by the Ford Foundation. Mahfuz Anam was the founding chair and Rehman Sobhan was the original treasurer of the organization. The founding trustee board included Debapriya Bhattacharya, Qazi Fazlur Rahman, Meghna Guhathakurta, Muhammad Younus, Nayla Khan, Sultana Kamal, Syed Manzoor Elahi, and Wahiduddin Mahmud. The board of trustee would later include Angela Gomes, Rokeya Afzal Rahman, Samson H Chowdhury, and Zafar Iqbal. Jamilur Reza Choudhury was affiliated with the organization.

In 2009, the foundation sponsored Museums: Building Community event at the Liberation War Museum. It is partnered with Agrogoti Sangstha, Local Environment Development and Agricultural Research Society, Udayankur Seba Sangstha.

Bangladesh Freedom Foundation has also received support from The Malala Fund and the Australian High Commission. It publishes a quarterly newsletter called Philanthropy. The Ford Foundation has mixed in with the Bangladesh Freedom Forum and has received criticism from the Gateway House of the Indian Council on Global Relation for hiring the best talent away from government service.

The foundation has provided funding for Bangladesh Junior Science Olympiad, Children Science Congress, National School Science Debate, STEM & ICT Skills for the Girls of Coastal Areas, and increasing harvest.

== Trustee board ==
- Mahfuz Anam (chair)
- Firdous Azim
- Rasheda K. Choudhury
- Perween Hasan
- Mohammad Kaykobad
- Pratima Paul Majumder
- M Arshad Momen
- Abdul Quayum
- Rezaur Rahman
- Zeba Islam Seraj
- Iftekharuzaman, executive director of Transparency International Bangladesh
