= Chowdhury Rafiqul Abrar =

Bangladeshi academic and former Adviser to the Education Ministry of Bangladesh

- চৌধুরী রফিকুল আবরার
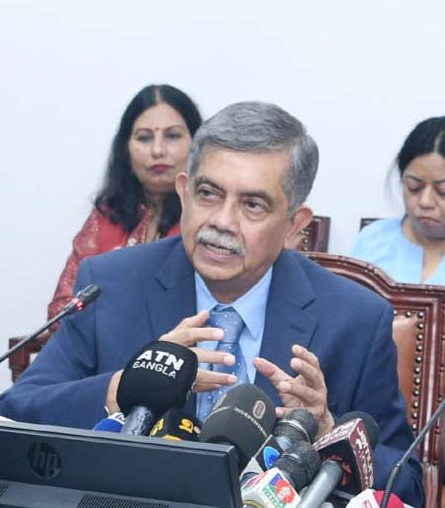
- Abrar in 2025

Adviser for Education
- In office 5 March 2025 – 17 February 2026
- Chief Adviser: Muhammad Yunus
- Preceded by: Wahiduddin Mahmud
- Succeeded by: A. N. M. Ehsanul Hoque Milan

Personal details
- Born: 17 August 1952 (age 74) Faridpur, East Bengal, Dominion of Pakistan
- Spouse: Tasneem Arefa Siddiqui
- Parents: Abdus Sattar Chowdhury (father); Sofia Sultana (mother)
- Education: University of Dhaka; University of Sussex; Griffith University
- Occupation: Professor

Chowdhury Rafiqul Abrar (born 17 August 1952) is a retired professor of international relations of the University of Dhaka, human rights activist, and executive director of Refugee and Migratory Movements Research Unit. He is the president of Odhikar, a human rights organization. On March 5, 2025, he was appointed as the Adviser to the Ministry of Education in the interim government of Bangladesh.

== Early life ==
Chowdhury Rafiqul Abrar was born on 17 August 1952 in Faridpur in the then East Bengal, Dominion of Pakistan to Abdus Sattar Chowdhury and Sofia Sultana. The family belongs to the Amirabad Estate, Faridpur. Abrar studied in St. Gregory's High School till class 8 and completed Matriculation and Intermediate from Mirzapur Cadet College. He Completed his bachelor from the Department of International Relations, University of Dhaka and master's from the University of Sussex. He completed his PhD from the Griffith University.

== Career ==
Abrar founded the Refugee and Migratory Movements Research Unit in 1995 along with Tasneem Arefa Siddiqui, Shahdeen Malik, Sumaiya Khair, and Yasmin Ali Haque.

Abrar wrote Aid, Development and Diplomacy in 1999. He coedited Towards National Refugee Laws in South Asia with Shahdeen Malik and published in 2000.

Abrar led a discussion on Ustad Allauddin Khan and Ustad Ayet Ali Khan organised by Ustad Ayet Ali Khan Sangeet Niketan and Mobarak Hossain Khan and attended by Professor Jahanara Begum, advisor to Prime Minister Khaleda Zia.

Abrar had called for the Digital Security Act to be repealed at an event by Nagorik in April 2023. He has spoken for the rights of Stranded Pakistanis in Bangladesh. He has claimed both China and the United States have almost the same policy when it comes to the Rohingya refugees in Bangladesh. He said the government of Bangladesh should claim responsibility of Rohingya people who flew to Saudi Arabia using Bangladeshi passports but was also critical of Saudi Arabia for pressuring Bangladesh regarding repatriating the refugees. He has written about victims of Enforced disappearance in Bangladesh.

Abrar has been critical of the Indian politicians and medias reaction to the fall of the Awami League government led by Prime Minister Sheikh Hasina. He described it as prejudiced.

== Personal life ==
Abrar is married to Tasneem Arefa Siddiqui, a Bangladeshi academic, professor of political science at the University of Dhaka and a daughter of writer and poet Ashraf Siddiqui.
