= To Kill a War Machine =

- Directed by: Hannan Majid; Richard York
- Production company: Rainbow Collective
- Release date: 2025
- Running time: 78 minutes
- Country: United Kingdom
- Language: English

To Kill a War Machine is a feature-length documentary film about the direct action group Palestine Action made by the film-makers Rainbow Collective. It blends first-person archival footage shot by activists on their raids on arms factories and other companies linked to the Gaza genocide such as Elbit Systems with testimony from those activists and people close to them.

== Censorship in the United Kingdom ==
Shortly after its release, the UK government proscribed its subject organisation as a "terrorist" group leading to concerns that the film would become illegal under the Terrorism Act's prohibition on broadly defined "support" for proscribed organisations. Co-director Hannan Majid said, "We've operated around the world and have a lot of experience of regimes telling us what we can and can't do. We've had authorities in Bangladesh telling us we shouldn't even be editing footage of garment workers and activists advocating for their rights, and we've been followed by the police in Cambodia, but we have never encountered anything like this in Britain."

The film had been granted a 15 certificate, uncut, for cinema exhibition by the BBFC, but this was rescinded following the proscription order.

== Reception ==
In response to the film's censorship, Art Review wrote: "the film's circulation becomes a defiant act, contested in the same legal theatre as the actions it documents". For the film itself, the reviewer said that "The film's potency lies in its immediacy: handheld cameras capturing activists smashing factory glass, scaling fences, dousing equipment in red paint. Interspersed with interviews and calm narration by Huda Ammori and Richard Barnard, cofounders of the group, it humanises a covert movement, presenting trespass and property damage as moral resistance to complicity in conflict. Rather than depicting protesters as faceless disruptors, it presents them as individuals bound by care, urgency and shared risk."

Film Inquiry wrote that, "Through its use of first-person archival footage, To Kill a War Machine puts you directly in the shoes of these activists. The filmmakers implicitly ask you to imagine yourself smashing hard drives, stealing top-secret information, sledgehammering windows, and barricading yourself into a drone factory. They ask you to consider how you would behave if you were in their shoes, and whether you have what it takes to stand up for Palestine through direct action. That ability to force this reckoning onto the viewer helps open their mind to the motivations and goals of Palestine Action and ultimately understand why these acts must be done as well as the ways in which the U.K. is complicit in the slaughter of Palestinians."
