= Bangladesh Garments Workers Unity Council =

National trade union centre of garment workers in Bangladesh

BGWUC
- Bangladesh Garments Workers Unity Council
- Founded: 1997
- Location: Bangladesh
- Key people: Mahatab Uddin Shahid, president Salauddin Shapon, secretary general Amirul Haque Amin, chairman
- Parent organization: National Garment Workers Federation

The Bangladesh Garments Workers Unity Council (BGWUC) is a national trade union centre in Bangladesh. The centre unites 21 garment worker trade union federations.

== Programme ==
=== Full pay and bonuses ===
BGWUC has repeatedly called for the full and timely payment of due wages and bonuses to workers. For example, in January 2006, BGWUC organised demonstrations in front of the headquarters of the Bangladesh Garment Manufacturers and Exporters Association (BGMEA), demanding the payment of Eid-ul-Azha bonuses for garment workers. Factory owners again delayed salary and Eid al-Fitr bonus payment in 2008, 2013 and 2018, and BGWUC again called for their timely payment.

=== Minimum wage ===
Another feature of BGWUC demonstrations are calls for an increase of the minimum wage. For example, BGWUC organised demonstrations calling for an increase of the 1994 minimum wage to 1,800 taka (~€17,5/$21,2) in September 2004. BGWUC again demanded an increase of the minimum wage to 1,800 taka and the full implementation of existing agreements with the BGMEA in 2005. In 2010, BGWUC organised demonstrations in front of Dhaka's National Press Club demanding an increase of the minimum wage to 5,000 taka. In 2018, BGWUC and other labour rights organisations demanded an increase of the minimum wage to 16,000 taka.

=== Celebrations ===
BGWUC also regularly takes parts in celebrations of important holidays, especially International Workers' Day and Bangladesh's victory day. For example, BGWUC was among the many Bangladeshi trade unions and other organisations who organised programmes for the 2004 May Day. The trade union also organised celebrations of that year's May Day and Victory Day in 2006. In 2009, BGWUC took part in the annual celebrations of Martyred Intellectuals Day.

=== Criticism ===
The activities of BGWUC have been criticized by scholars for following a repetitive pattern since its founding in 1997: First, the announcement of tough demands by BGWUC and reluctance by the BGMEA to negotiate; second, BGWUC conducting a strike and BGMEA being eager to come to an agreement; and third, after the end of public attention, the refusal of BGMEA to implement the agreement. This has been described as a "prime example of the unions' inadequacy" and an indication of "labour's impotence".

== History ==
The BGWUC was founded in 1997 by the National Garment Workers Federation and six other trade union federations.

In 2004, BGWUC organised demonstrations calling for the compensation for victims of the 2004 Bangladesh floods and the full implementation of existing agreements with the BGMEA. At another demonstration in that month, BGWUC called for the arrest of the murderers of Rahela, a garment worker who had been raped and murdered in August.

In May 2005, BGWUC conducted a hunger strike in Muktangon, calling for better compensation for the victims of the 2005 Dhaka garment factory collapse and demanding exemplary punishment of the factory's owners.

In September 2008, BGWUC demanded factory owners issue their workers identity cards that through a government scheme would allow them to buy food and other commodities at a discount. According to BGWUC, half of Bangladesh's garment workers had at that point not been issued an identity card. The trade union also protested the deployment of police in garment factories, saying this had turned them into jails. In 2011, the trade union centre again called on the government to ensure the delivery of documents, including identity cards, to workers.

Following the 2012 Dhaka garment factory fire, BGWUC organised mourning processions and demonstrations calling for better compensations of victims and their families as well as better working conditions and union rights in the garment industry in general.

In 2013, BGWUC criticised the newly passed Labour Law 2006. It said that a provision allowing factory owners not to pay workers accused of vandalism would be abused and that the law would allow the firing of workers without a specific reason.

== Affiliates ==
- National Garment Workers Federation
- IndustriALL Bangladesh Council
- Bangladesh National Garment Workers Employee's League
- Bangladesh Institute of Labour Studies
- Bangladesh Garments Workers Federation
- Bangladesh Revolutionary Garments Workers Federation
- Bangladesh Garment Industry Workers Federation
- Several more
