= Tears in the Fabric =

- Directed by: Hannan Majid; Richard York
- Produced by: Abbas Nokhasteh; Hannan Majid; Richard York
- Starring: Razia Begum
- Edited by: Hannan Majid; Richard York
- Music by: John Pandit; Louis Beckett; Agnit Productions
- Production companies: Rainbow Collective; Open Vizor
- Release date: 24 April 2014 (United Kingdom)
- Running time: 30 minutes
- Country: United Kingdom
- Language: Bengali

Tears in the Fabric is a 2014 British documentary film directed by Hannan Majid and Richard York. The film documents the toll that the 2013 Rana Plaza disaster has taken on a Bangladeshi garment factory worker named Razia Begum.

== Summary ==
After the Rana Plaza disaster, documentary filmmakers, Hannan Majid and Richard York returned to Bangladesh to make their second film on the plight of garment workers.

The film observes the toll the disaster has taken on one woman named Razia Begum. She lost both her daughters and her son-in-law in Rana Plaza and now struggles to care for her two surviving orphaned grandsons, who have been left without financial support. While having to come to terms with an enormous personal loss, the tragedy rendered Begum and her grandsons homeless – the result of losing her family's livelihood.

Begum is yet to receive any financial compensation from factory management or the major brands. She moves from shelter to shelter each night, with eight-year-old Bijoi and six-year-old Parvez, while fighting for compensation from the brands involved in the disaster. Raising and educating her grandsons, she searches for resolution and answers through protest on the streets of Dhaka and amongst the rubble and torn fabrics of Rana Plaza.

== Production ==
Since the release of the 2010 film The Machinists, Rainbow Collective built strong ties with the National Garment Workers Federation (NGWF), who were instrumental in securing the access and characters for Tears in the Fabric. In February 2014, Rainbow Collective visited Savar, Bangladesh to shoot the documentary.

== Release ==
Tears in the Fabric had its charity premiere in London on 24 April 2014, courtesy of Open Vizor, War on Want, Traid and Rainbow Collective, at Regent's University to raise money for the families of the Rana Plaza victims. The film was also part of the Brick Lane Circle's fourth annual conference.

== Reception ==
Julie Flynn Badal of The Huffington Post said, "Tears in the Fabric, is an intimate portrait of the fall-out from Rana Plaza long after the world has moved on to other news items... a film that is not afraid to look grief squarely in the eye. And that is no small feat in a culture that can so easily go numb to the grim realities behind our consumption."

Tracy McVeigh of The Guardian said about the film, "to press more brands to pay up and sign the Bangladeshi safety accord." Films For Food called the film "...a starkly honest and deeply moving view of the human cost of high street fashion."

== Awards and nominations ==
Year	Award	Category	Result
2014	Workers Unite! Film Festival	Documentary Short	Honorable Mention

== See also ==
- 2013 Savar building collapse
