= Beggzadi Mahmuda Nasir =

- বেগজাদী মাহমুদা নাসির

Vice-Chancellor of Central Women's University
- In office 1993–1996

Personal details
- Born: 16 April 1929
- Died: 3 November 2015 (aged 86) Dhaka, Bangladesh
- Spouse: A A Abdul Matin
- Education: Lady Brabourne College; University of Dhaka
- Awards: Begum Rokeya Padak (2001), Anannya Top Ten Awards (2001)

Beggzadi Mahmuda Nasir (16 April 1929 – 3 November 2015) was a Bangladeshi academic. She served as the founder principal of Central Women's College from 1956 until 1992 and then as the vice-chancellor of Central Women's University during 1993–1996. She was awarded Begum Rokeya Padak by the Government of Bangladesh in 2001. She was selected an honorary fellow of Bangla Academy in 2002.

== Early life and education ==
Nasir completed her bachelor's from Lady Brabourne College, Kolkata in 1947 and masters in English literature from the University of Dhaka in 1950.

== Career ==
Nasir started her career in 1951 as a lecturer in English at Kumudini College, Tangail. In 1956, she founded the Central Women's College (CWC) in Dhaka. In 1993, she founded Central Women's University, the first women's university in Bangladesh. She was a syndicate member of Jahangirnagar University from 1976 to 1986, an academic council and senate member of the University of Dhaka from 1965 to 1970.

== Awards ==
- Begum Rokeya Padak (2001)
- Anannya Top Ten Awards (2001)

== Personal life and death ==
Nasir was married to A A Abdul Matin, former head of the English department of Jagannath College. She died at Square Hospital on 3 November 2015.
