= Natasha Sayce-Zelem =

Head of technology at Sky

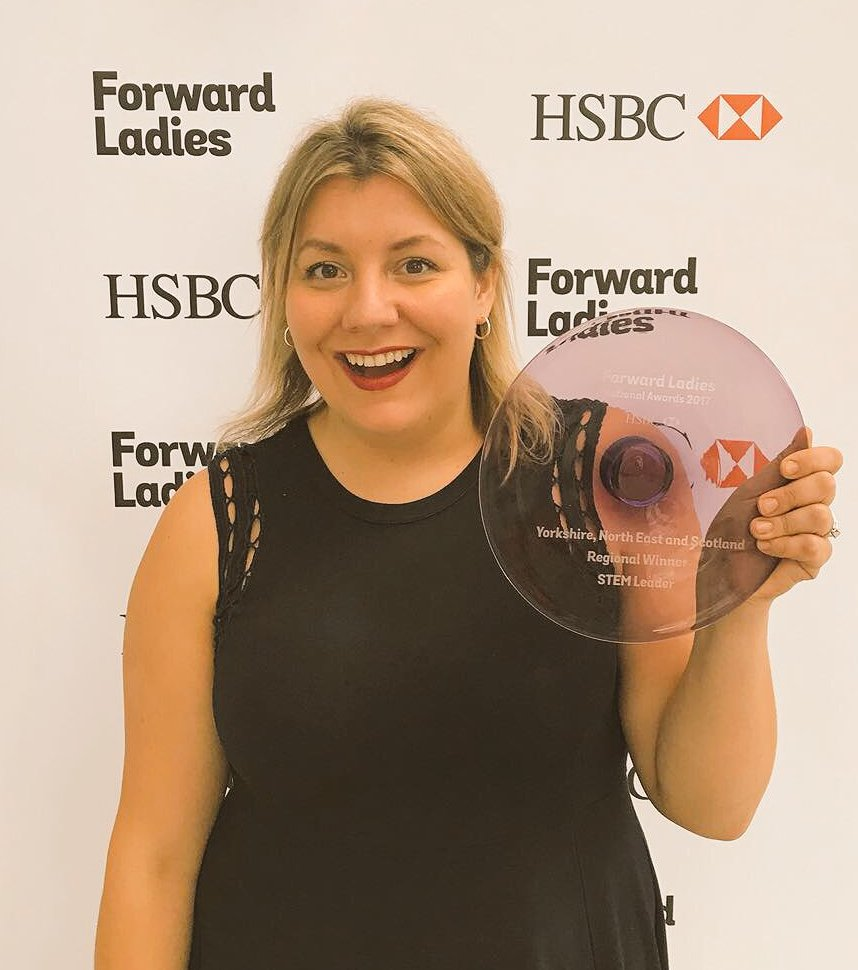
- Sayce-Zelem winning STEM leader of the year award in 2017
- Born: Natasha Zelem; Leeds
- Education: Northern Film School
- Known for: Women in Technology

Natasha Sayce-Zelem (née Natasha Zelem) is an AI and technology executive specialising in product, digital platforms and applied artificial intelligence. She is a founder of 'Empowering Women with Tech', a social enterprise showcasing female role models working in digital media, science, and technology with the goal of getting more women to consider a career in STEM in England.

She was named the 27th most influential woman working in tech and in Computer Weekly's 'Most Influential Women in UK Tech' shortlist from 2018 to 2026..

On 5 May 2024, it was announced that Natasha Sayce-Zelem would have her name engraved on a new sculpture, Ribbons, in Leeds city centre. Designed by Pippa Hale, the sculpture will celebrate 383 women past and present who have contributed to the city as chosen by the public.

== Early life and education ==
Natasha was born in Leeds in 1983. Her father Eugene Zelem was a props master in film and television. Her mother emigrated from Poland to Leeds. She has one sister, Helena who also works in a digital career. She attended Roundhay School in Leeds.

Sayce-Zelem graduated with a first class degree from the Northern Film School where she specialised in producing and editing.

== Career ==
Prior to working in technology and digital development, Natasha Sayce-Zelem began her career as a freelance music photographer, working with acts such as David Bowie and Rage Against the Machine. She has gone on to work at various technology and media companies, including ITV, BBC, Sky and Amazon.

Sayce-Zelem founded 'Empowering Women with Tech' to highlight and improve upon the lack of visible female role models working in STEM, and help women begin their careers in the field. Over 10,000 people have attended an Empowering Women with Tech event, with past speakers including Dr Sue Black, Samantha Payne, Linda Liukas and Sarah Beeny.

In October 2017, Sayce-Zelem won 'STEM Leader of the Year' for Yorkshire, North East and Scotland and has written nationally for Business Cloud, Huffington Post and i Newspaper.

In 2018, Sayce-Zelem joined the steering group for the BIMA Diversity & Inclusion Council alongside Sue Black, Amali de Alwis and Pip Jamieson.

In 2021, Sayce-Zelem was announced as a team member of the Newsubstance collective, one of 10 commissioned project for Festival UK 2022. The STEM led commission is a "physical manifestation and celebration of the British weather and UK coastline; a large-scale installation that addresses global questions, encourages playfulness, elicits joy and presents an experiment in change."

In January 2021 it was announced that Natasha Sayce-Zelem had joined Amazon to lead the Partner Engineering organisation at Amazon Prime Video.

Her name is one of those featured on the sculpture Ribbons, unveiled in 2024.
