= Bafana =

- Directed by: Hannan Majid; Richard York
- Starring: Gerald Jacobs
- Production company: Rainbow Collective
- Release date: 2006
- Running time: 20 minutes
- Country: United Kingdom
- Languages: Zulu; English

Bafana is a 2006 British documentary film directed by Hannan Majid and Richard York. The film looks at the life and experiences of Cape Town's street children.

== Summary ==
The film focuses on children in the care of 'The Homestead', a charity based in District Six, Cape Town, South Africa, established to rehabilitate children and reunite them with their families. It features Homestead street worker Gerald Jacobs and his dedication to rehabilitating street kids.

It shows how The Homestead provides a safe shelter and a type of community surrogate family through the permanent children's home in Kayelitsha Township. It provides basic schooling in Learn to Live School in downtown Cape Town: teaching respect, manners and basic life skills. At each location, the children talk of their time on the streets, their reasons for running away from home and the way they see their lives turning out.

== Release ==
Bafana was screened at the Nantes British Film Festival 2008 and Mosaiques International Film Festival 2010.

== Reception ==
Debbie Myburg of The South African said about Bafana, "The film shows how children living on streets are visible evidence that something is wrong with SA's marginalised society, and that steps need to be taken to protect and care for all individuals."

== See also ==
- AmaZulu: The Children of Heaven
