= Syed Manzur Elahi =

Bangladeshi businessperson and chairman (1942–2025)

- সৈয়দ মঞ্জুর এলাহী
- Born: 26 February 1942; Calcutta, Bengal Presidency, British India
- Died: 12 March 2025 (aged 83); Singapore
- Education: University of Dhaka, St. Xavier's College, Kolkata
- Children: Syed Nasim Manzur

Syed Manzur Elahi (26 February 1942 – 12 March 2025) was a Bangladeshi businessperson and chairman of Apex group.

== Early life ==
Elahi's father Sir Syed Nasim Ali was the Chief Justice of the undivided Bengal on 26 February 1946.

Elahi received his B.A. from St. Xavier's College, Kolkata. He earned his master's degree from the University of Dhaka in Economics. He founded and was the chairman of Holiday Publications Limited. He moved to Dhaka in 1962 from Kolkata. In 1972, he resigned from his job and started working as an agent for a French leather importer. In 1975, the Bangladesh government started to privatize companies that were nationalised. He bought one such company, Orient Tannery, in Hazaribag, Dhaka for 1.2 million taka.

== Career ==
Elahi ventured into the business world on his 30th birthday after a seven-year tenure at British American Tobacco. He was the chairman of Apex group. He was an administrator of the Federation of Bangladesh Chambers of Commerce and Industry. He was an adviser to the Caretaker Government of Bangladesh. He was the chairman of the Trustee board of East West University. In 2008, he was the president of Dhaka University Alumni Association. He held a term as the chairman of Pioneer Insurance Company Limited. He was the chairman of the Bangladesh Freedom Foundation.

== Personal life ==
Elahi was married to Niloufer Manzur. She had founded Sunbeams School in Bangladesh. Both of them contracted COVID-19 in 2020 where Elahi survived but Niloufer died on 26 May 2020.

== Death ==
Elahi died in Singapore on 12 March 2025, at the age of 83.
