= Mass E Bhat =

- Promotional poster
- Directed by: Hannan Majid; Richard York
- Edited by: Hugh Williams
- Music by: John Pandit; Lou Beckett; Rowen Perkins
- Production companies: Rainbow Collective; Channel 4 BRITDOC Foundation
- Release date: 22 June 2014 (East End Film Festival)
- Running time: 72 minutes
- Country: United Kingdom
- Language: Bengali

Mass E Bhat (Bengali: মাস ই ভাট) is a 2014 British documentary film directed by Hannan Majid and Richard York. The film weaves together the stories of children living and working in Bangladesh.

== Summary ==
Set in Bangladesh, the documentary follows 20-year-old Nasir, a social worker in the slums, who moved from a rural village to the city. He reflects and recounts on his childhood working in rubbish dumps and sweatshops from the age of eight, how he grew up, and achieved his dream of an getting an education and respect within his community.

As social worker, he wanders the alleyways of Dhaka's Korrail slum searching for working children to try to convince to enrol in school for a better future. As Nasir recounts his life, the documentary also features several children, parents and employers, who mirror his past.

== Development ==
Mass E Bhat entered the Good Pitch event at Amnesty's East London Auditorium, organised by Channel 4's BRITDOC Foundation and Sundance Institute in September 2009. The film subsequently received production funding from the Channel 4 BRITDOC Foundation.

After finishing editing and post-production on the film, an outreach campaign was launched to raise awareness and improve treatment for children like those it featured in the film.

== Release ==
Mass E Bhat premiered at the East End Film Festival on 22 June 2014. It was screened at Rix Mix on 15 September. It was screened at Elefest in October of the same year.

== Reception ==
Frontline Club London said, "Mass E Bhat is a portrait of a developing nation through the eyes of its children." Rich Mix called the film an "exploration of what it means to grow up in Bangladesh... A film full of fascinating, moving stories, this is a portrait of a nation in flux, the emotional impact of which is raised by a brilliant score from John Pandit from Asian Dub Foundation."

Oliver Zarandi of East End Review said of the film, "The filmmakers see Mass E Bhat as a way of reaching out to cinema goers and raising awareness while passing on the skills of documentary making to another generation." Tarannum Nibir of Paraa said of the film, "kids can express themselves, share their lifestyles and also can show anything they want in a film."

== Awards and nominations ==
Year	Award	Category	Result
2014	East End Film Festival	Best Documentary Award	Nominated
2014	East End Film Festival	Best Soundtrack Award	Nominated
