= Central Women's University =

Private university for women in Dhaka, Bangladesh

Coordinates: 23.7201°N 90.4242°E

- সেন্ট্রাল উইমেন্স ইউনিভার্সিটি
- Other name: CWU
- Motto: Power to Women
- Type: Private
- Established: 1993; 33 years ago
- Accreditation: University Grants Commission (UGC)
- Affiliations: University Grants Commission (UGC)
- Chancellor: President Mohammed Shahabuddin
- Vice-Chancellor: Perween Hasan
- Academic staff: 100
- Administrative staff: 100
- Students: 1000
- Undergraduates: 500
- Postgraduates: 100
- Doctoral students: N/A
- Location: Dhaka, Bangladesh
- Campus: Urban
- Website: www.cwu.edu.bd

Central Women's University (CWU) is a private universities in Bangladesh, established in 1993. It was the first university in Bangladesh established exclusively for the purpose of female education. Beggzadi Mahmuda Nasir served as the founding vice-chancellor of the university until 1999.

Following mismanagement on the part of the original governing body, it was one of the eight universities the University Grants Commission of Bangladesh recommended for shutting down due to poor quality of academic standards. The university was also served with show-cause notice by judicial authorities asking why it would not be closed down.

As of August, 2010, the university received legal permission from the court to continue its educational activities under a new governing body and with new academic faculty and expanded academic offerings.

== Academic programs ==
Degrees currently offered are:

- Bachelor of Business Administration
- Master of Business Administration
- Executive Master of Business Administration
- Bachelor of Science in Computer Science and Engineering
- Bachelor of Arts in English Literature
- Bachelor of Social Science in Political Science and Governance Studies
- Bachelor of Social Science in Sociology and Gender Studies
- Bachelor of Social Science in Geography and Environmental Studies
- Bachelor of Arts in Journalism and Media Studies

== List of vice-chancellors ==
- Perween Hasan (present)
