= Perween Hasan =

Bangladesh academic and activist

- পারভীন হাসান

Vice-Chancellor Central Women's University

Personal details
- Education: University of Dhaka (MA); Harvard University (PhD)

Perween Hasan is a Bangladeshi academic and women's rights activist. She is the chairperson of Transparency International Bangladesh. She is the Vice-Chancellor of the Central Women's University. In 2024, she received the Begum Rokeya Padak from the government of Bangladesh.

== Early life ==
Hasan completed her bachelor's degree and master's in English from the University of Dhaka. She did her second master's in Regional Studies and PhD in Islamic Architecture from Harvard University in 1984.

== Career ==
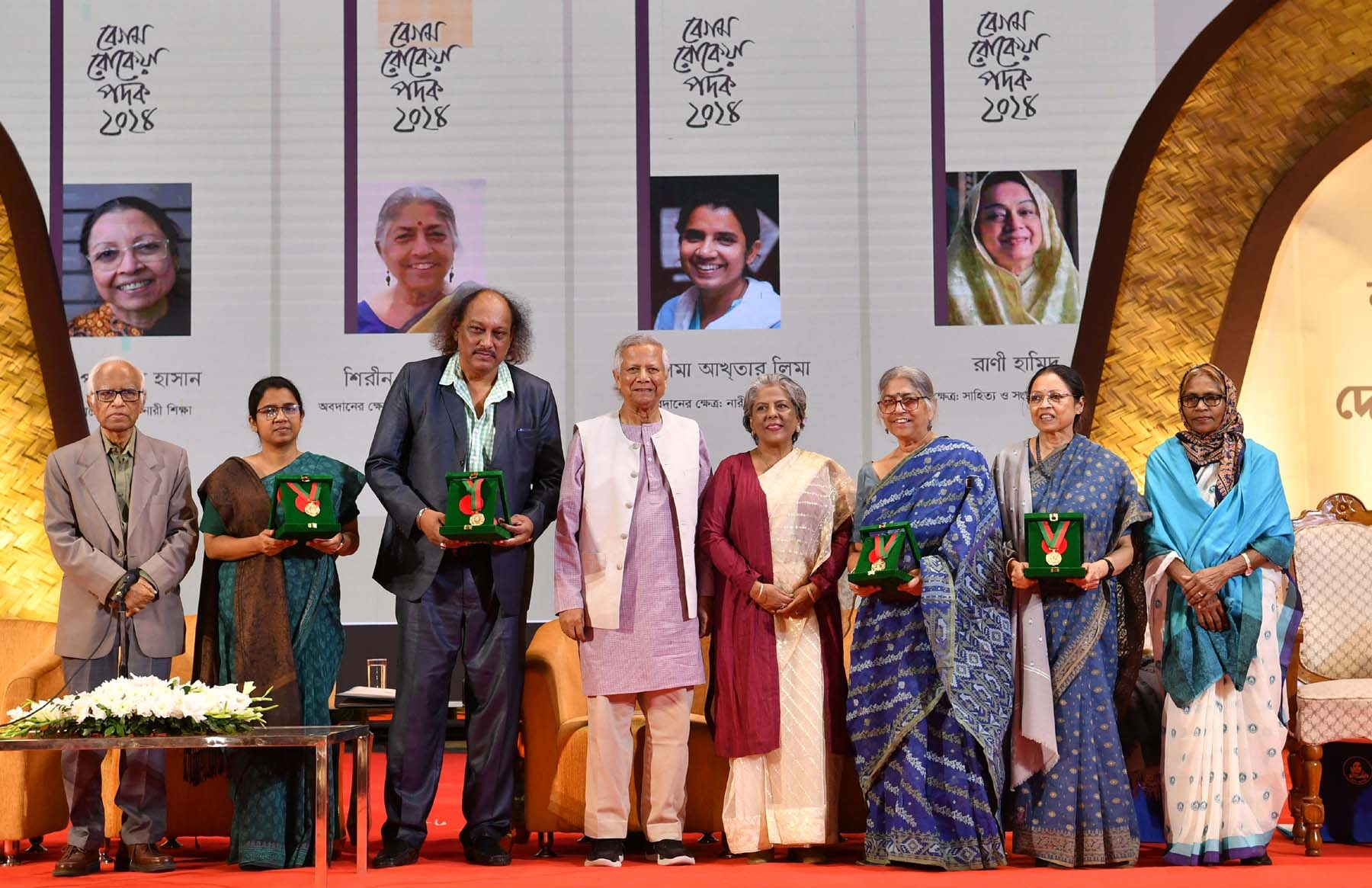
Hasan receiving 2024 Begum Rokeya Padak

After Hasan completed her PhD she joined the Department of Islamic History and Culture at the University of Dhaka.

From 1993 to 1994, Hasan was at the Oberlin College as the Fulbright Scholar-in-Residence.

From 1998 to 2000, Hasan served as a founding executive committee member of American Alumni Association. Hasan was recognized by the American Alumni Association 2005 for her contributions to the association.

Hasan wrote and published her book Sultans and Mosques: The Early Muslim Architecture of Bangladesh in 2007. She also published Old Churches and Cemeteries of Dhaka. She presented the key note paper in the 2011 'Cultural Transformations: Development Initiatives and Social Movements conference.

In 2013, Hasan wrote in the Allal or Dulal website and accused David Nalin of being a smuggler of antiquities from Bangladesh. She presented a paper titled "Situating Rokeya" at the Begum Rokeya Day event of women and gender studies department of the University of Dhaka.

Hasan was the guest of honor at the book launch of Untold Stories of Migrants: Dreams and Realities by Refugee and Migratory Movements Research Unit in January 2017. She was named one of the Anannya Top Ten Awards (2016) recipient in 2017. She hosted a session of the International Conference: Refugees in the Public Imagination: Discourse on (Dis)location and (Dis)placement at the University of Liberal Arts Bangladesh in December 2017.

In August 2018, Hasan signed a petition asking the government to investigation allegations that Shahidul Alam had been tortured in detention by law enforcement officers.

Hasan was elected chairperson of the Board of Trustee of the Transparency International Bangladesh. She replaced Advocate Sultana Kamal as chairperson 22 February 2020. She inaugurated the 15th Anti-Corruption Cartoon Exhibition in December 2020.

Hasan is member of the Trustee Board of Bangladesh Freedom Foundation. She is a subject editor of Banglapedia. She is a member of the advisory board for Bangladesh of the South Asia Foundation.
