= National Garment Workers Federation =

National trade union federation of garment workers in Bangladesh

NGWF
- National Garment Workers Federation
- NGWF strike on 2 March 2006 to protest over 100 deaths in the KTS factory fire.
- Founded: 1984
- Headquarters: 31/F Topkhana Road; Dhaka-1000
- Location: Bangladesh
- Members: 41,303 (claimed)
- Key people: Amirul Haque Amin, President; Rafiquel Islam, General Secretary
- Affiliations: IndustriALL Global Union
- Website: www.ngwfbd.com

The National Garment Workers Federation (NGWF) is a registered national trade union federation of garment workers in Bangladesh. With 87 registered factory unions, it is considered one of the four main federations of garment workers' unions. NGWF is the initiator anda member of the Bangladesh Garments Workers Unity Council and a member of the Bangladesh Center for Workers' Solidarity. It is affiliated with the IndustriALL Global Union and one of the signatories of the Bangladesh Accord.

== Organisation ==
The central office of NGWF is situated in Dhaka. There are 11 branch offices in various garment industrial zones around Bangladesh, organising 87 registered factory unions and 1261 factory committees. NGWF claims to currently have 41,303 members in total, with 23,520 of those being women and 17,783 men. These elect the Central Executive Committee on a biannual basis. Of the 30 members of that committee, 15 are women, including the general secretary, vice president and treasurer.

== History ==
In 2002, the NGWF called for a country-wide strike in the Bangladeshi garment industry for September 1. Demands included workers and union rights and health and safety issues.

Following the collapse of a garment factory in Dhaka in 2005, NGWF organised a protest against unsafe work environments in Dhaka, together with Jatiya Sramik Federation, Bangladesh Garment Sramik Federation and Bangladesh Jatiyatabadi Garments Workers Federation. NGWF again organised a rally in Dhaka following the 2012 garment factory fire in Dhaka, in which 125 workers lost their lives. They again called for more work place safety, as well as compensation for the families of the deceased and the payment of medical bills.

NGWF together with other unions, organised the campaign that led to an increase in the minimum wage for garment workers to 3,000 taka (~€29.6/$35.49) in 2010. The union at that time said this was still far from sufficient and continued to demand a living wage. Three years later, NGWF, together with the Alternative Movement for Resources and Freedom Society, conducted a survey that found the average monthly expenditure of working families was 4 times as high as the 2010 minimum wage.

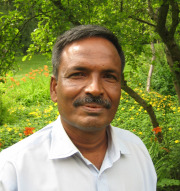
Portrait of Amirul Haque Amin

NGWF's president, Amirul Haque Amin, was awarded the Nuremberg International Human Rights Award for his work as an advocate of workers' rights in 2015. In an interview, Amin said the prize was a recognition of Bangladesh's trade union and garment workers' movement and a show of respect for the dead of the 2005 and 2012 disasters.

In June 2016, the factory of Bangladeshi garment company Tejgaon Textile was closed down after a Bangladesh Accord inspection had identified major structural faults in the building. Workers were left without salaries and festival bonuses for the upcoming Eid al-Fitr. NGWF organised protests and filed a complaint at the Bangladesh Garment Manufacturers and Exporters Association (BGMEA), following which compensation and an Eid bonus were paid out. In the same month, NGWF workers protested against and stopped the relocation of the factories of Ananta Apparels and Ananta Fashion, which would have endangered 6,000 jobs.

In 2017, NGWF conducted a survey of garment factories producing for H&M that included more than a dozen factories found problems, such as oral terminations without reason, no maternity leave and physical violence in response to complaints about bad working conditions. NGWF and IndustriALL also campaigned for the release of detained workers and trade unionists in the run-up to that year's Dhaka Apparel Summit. 2 days before the summit started, labour ministry, BGMEA and unions reached an agreement to release the detainees. NGWF President Amin was present when State Minister of Labour Mujibul Haque publicly announced the agreement while describing the detained protestors as "vandals". H&M, Inditex, C&A, Next and Tchibo, who had earlier said they would boycott the Summit, agreed not to do so. According to Ashraf and Prentice, workers' safety was "considered to be a settled issue" at the Summit.

In January 2019, garment workers again demanded an increase of the minimum wage. After eight days of protests, including workers burning vehicles and blocking roads as well as police using tear gas shells and water cannons, the minimum wage was modestly increased. NGWF said it did not approve of the "anarchy" of the protests and welcomed the revised wage structure. At the same time, NGWF condemned that workers who had taken part in the protest were laid off and more than 100 arrested. In August, NGWF organised protests demanding the reinstatement of 12,436 workers fired during the January protests and a withdrawal of police cases against 7,458 workers.

In 2020, NGWF organised protests calling for the payment of due wages and the reopening of factories closed without paying workers. In October, the representative of IndustriALL Bangladesh Council, with which NGWF is affiliated, resigned from a tripartite committee formed with the government and BGMEA to review labour rules. He said he had been excluded from the latest meetings and threatened protests if labour rules were adjusted without worker representation.

== See also ==
- The Machinists
- Tears in the Fabric
