= Renata Limited =

Pharmaceutical company in Bangladesh

Renata PLC
- Type: Limited Company
- Traded as: DSE: RENATA
- Industry: Pharmaceutical
- Founded: 1993; 33 years ago
- Headquarters: Mirpur, Dhaka, Bangladesh
- Area served: South Asia, South East Asia, Africa, Europe and Latin America
- Key people: Syed S Kaiser Kabir (CEO)
- Products: Maxpro, Rolac, Fenadin, Rolip, Furoclav and more
- Number of employees: 3485
- Website: renata-ltd.com

Renata PLC (formerly Pfizer Laboratories (Bangladesh) Limited), also known as Renata Limited, is one of the top ten pharmaceutical manufacturers in Bangladesh in terms of revenue. Renata is engaged in the manufacture and marketing of human pharmaceutical and animal health products. The company also manufactures animal therapeutics and nutrition products. As of 2024, Renata employs about 11,000 people in its head office in Mirpur, Dhaka and its 14 production facilities in Mirpur, Dhaka, Rajendrapur, Gazipur and Bhaluka, Mymensingh.

== Financial data ==
Renata is a publicly traded company on the Dhaka Stock Exchange (ticker: RENATA).

== Production facilities ==
Recently, Renata Limited has received the UK MHRA approval for its Potent Product Facility. This facility is exporting prednisolone to the UK.

The company also operates four other manufacturing units – the original Pfizer facility for general products, a UNICEF-approved SFF (Sachet Filling Facility).

== Partnerships ==
Recently, GAIN (The Global Alliance for Improved Nutrition) provided US$2.9 million to Renata Limited and BRAC, one of the biggest NGOs in the developing world, to build and operate an innovative business model to produce and deliver multi-nutrient powders to vulnerable infants in Bangladesh.

== Controversy ==
Renata was initially fined on 21 January 2016 by the Department of Environment for damaging the environment, though it was not finally proven. It was claimed by a group of company that Renata has also illegally occupied land owned by the forest department while they failed to provide any proof. And also an unproven claim that, Syed S. Kaiser Kabir, the CEO, of the company had illegally grabbed government land to build a house near Dhaka-Mymensingh highway.
