= Association for Land Reform and Development =

Bangladeshi organisation

- Formation: 1991
- Headquarters: Dhaka, Bangladesh
- Region served: Bangladesh
- Official language: Bengali

Association for Land Reform and Development (Bengali: অ্যাসোসিয়েশন ফর ল্যান্ড রিফর্ম এ্যান্ড ডেভেলপমেন্ট) is a Bangladeshi non-profit organisation dedicated to land reform.

== History ==
NGO Coordination Council for Land Reforms Programme was created in 1987 by Association for Social Advancement, Caritas Internationalis, Comilla Proshika, Gono Unnayan Prochesta, Manab Unnayan Kendra, Nijera Kori, Oxfam, Proshika, and RDRS Bangladesh. The organisation aimed to coordinate land reforms and settlements in cooperation with the government of Bangladesh.

NGO Coordination Council for Land Reforms Programme was changed into an independent organization called the Association for Land Reform and Development in 1991. It has 273 associate organisations in Bangladesh. It is a member of International Land Coalition, based in Rome, and Asian NGO Coalition for Agrarian Reform and Rural Development, based in Manila. It organizes seminars on land reforms in Bangladesh.
