= Traíd =

Traíd, Spain
- Location within Province of Guadalajara Location within Castilla-La Mancha Location within Spain
- Coordinates: 40°40′11″N 1°48′30″W
- Country: Spain
- Autonomous community: Castile-La Mancha
- Province: Guadalajara
- Municipality: Traíd

Area
  - Total: 48 km^{2} (19 sq mi)

Population (2025-01-01)
  - Total: 18
  - Density: 0.38/km^{2} (0.97/sq mi)
- Time zone: UTC+1 (CET)
  - Summer (DST): UTC+2 (CEST)

Traíd (Spanish pronunciation: [tɾaˈið]) is a municipality located in the province of Guadalajara, Castile-La Mancha, Spain. According to the 2004 census (INE), the municipality has a population of 62 inhabitants.
