= Iftekharuzzaman =

Bangladeshi economist and activist

Iftekharuzzaman is the executive director of Transparency International Bangladesh.

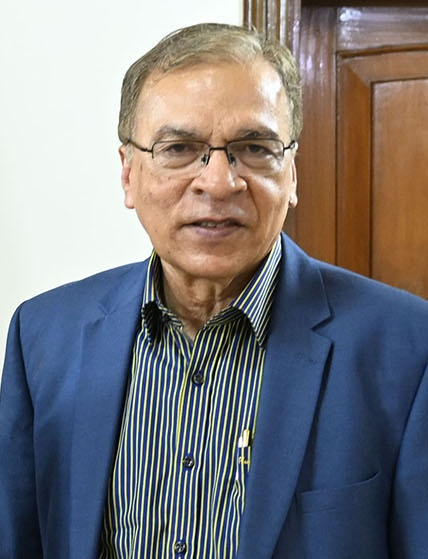
Iftekharuzzaman in 2025

== Early life ==
Iftekharuzzaman completed high school in 1968 under the Board of Intermediate and Secondary Education, Jessore. did his undergraduate studies in economics from the University of Dhaka. He completed his graduate studies in economics from the Wrocław University of Economics. He earned his PhD from the SGH Warsaw School of Economics. His did his post doc research from the University of Tokyo in international relations from 1988 to 1989.

== Career ==
Iftekharuzzaman was a researcher and later research director at Bangladesh Institute of International and Strategic Studies from 1982 to 1995. From 1995 to 1999, Iftekharuzzaman was the executive director of the Regional Centre For Strategic Studies in Sri Lanka.

From 1991 to 2004, Iftekharuzzaman was the executive director of Bangladesh Freedom Foundation. After leaving Bangladesh Freedom Foundation, he joined as the executive director of Transparency International Bangladesh in September 2004.

In October 2007, Iftekharuzzaman defended Transparence International Bangladesh report on corruption in non governmental organizations after it was attacked by Association of Development Agencies in Bangladesh.

Iftekharuzzaman was elected to the international board of directors of Transparency International in 2008, 2012, and 2015. In January 2008, he was a panelist in a conference, BBC Bangladesh Sanglap, organized by BBC World Service Trust and BBC Bangla Service.

Iftekharuzzaman called the cancellation of World Bank loan for Padma Bridge an "acid test" for the government due to the Padma Bridge graft scandal in 2012. In 2014, he warned Bangladesh was on the way to becoming a kleptocracy.

In May 2015, Iftekharuzzaman was awarded the Global Partnership Forum for Social Accountability Award by the World Bank. In 2019, he called for policy reforms due to the abuse of power by VIPs. He called the murder of Nusrat Jahan Rafi in 2019 an "acid test" for the government.

Iftekharuzzaman is a trustee of Bangladesh Freedom Foundation and Bishwo Shahitto Kendro. He is a member of the International Chittagong Hill Tracts Commission. He is a member of the Citizen's Platform for SDGs, Bangladesh. He wrote Nuclear Non-Proliferation in India and Pakistan: South Asian, Perspectives and South Asian Security, Primacy of Internal Dimension. He has criticized the government for failure to prevent large scale money laundering. In 2020, he criticized a provision of the budget that allowed black money (untaxed) to be legalized.

According to Transparency International Bangladesh and Iftekharuzzaman, the Anti Corruption Commission was acting under the influence of the Awami League and not as an independent body. He called for greater transparency in the distribution of COVID-19 vaccines during the COVID-19 pandemic in Bangladesh.
