= Shushashoner Jonno Nagorik =

- Formation: 2002
- Headquarters: Dhaka, Bangladesh
- Region served: Bangladesh
- Official language: Bengali
- Website: shujan.org

Shushashoner Jonno Nagorik (translation: Citizens for Good Governance) (SHUJAN) is an organization in Bangladesh. The word SHUJAN, is a Bengali word. It came from an sentence "Shushanar Janniya Nagorik – SHUJAN". The headquarter of this organization located in Mohammadpur, Dhaka.

== History ==
SHUJAN was founded in 2002. Badiul Alam Majumdar is the founding secretary of Shujan.

In October 2022, Shujan said that it would be not possible for a political government in Bangladesh to hold a fair election using the by-elections from Gaibandha-5 as an example. Badiul Alam Majumdar denied allegations by the chief election commission, KM Nurul Huda, that he criticised the Election Commission after failing to get a job from the commission.

== Goals and objectives ==
SHUJAN's goals and objectives are to create a good government around the country. It focuses mainly for creating a democratic country. Often, they arrange some meetings, press conference for gaining their goals and drawing attention. They try to show the lacking of election system in the country. And also they give suggestions to election commission or authority for creating a pure democratic country. Not only SHUJAN tries to create good government but also it tries to solve social issues. They often work with other organizations.

== Structure ==
There are four parts of SHUJAN. They are central, district, upazila and union. Central committee plays an important role by taking decisions, work plan and future initiatives. The Current secretary of SHUJAN is Badiul Alam Majumdar. Current central coordinator of this organization is Dilip Kumar Sharkar.

== Governing body ==
Name	Position	Reference
M Hafizuddin Khan	President	
Hameeda Hossain	Vice-president	
Badiul Alam Majumdar	Editor	
Zakir Hossain	Associate Editor	
Syed Abu Naser Bukhtear Ahmed	Treasurer	
Justice Md. Abdul Mateen	Member	
Syed Abul Maksud	Member	
Professor Dr. Tofail Ahmed	Member	
Ali Imam Majumdar	Member	
Shahdeen Malik	Member	
Rizwana Hasan	Member	
Professor Robaet Ferdous	Member	
Dr. Shahnaz Huda	Member	
Engineer Musbah Alim	Member	
Professor M Sikandar Khan	Member	
Principal Zafar Imam	Member	
Farooq Mahmud Chowdhury	Member	
Safiuddin Ahmed	Member	
Akbar Hossain	Member	
Md. Mukarram Hossain	Member	
Professor Gazi Zahid Hossain	Member	
