= The Machinists =

- Promotional poster
- Directed by: Hannan Majid; Richard York
- Cinematography: Hannan Majid
- Edited by: Richard York; Hannan Majid; Nidham Farreh
- Production company: Rainbow Collective
- Release date: October 2012 (East End Film Festival)
- Running time: 52 minutes
- Country: United Kingdom
- Language: Bengali

The Machinists is a 2012 British documentary film directed by Hannan Majid and Richard York. The film documents the exploitation of garment workers in Bangladesh with the personal stories of three young women working in factories in Dhaka.

== Summary ==
The filmmakers first introduce a young woman whose husband abandoned her when she was pregnant with her first child. She lives in one room with seven other family members. She and her two sisters, who are also single mothers, work as machinists in the factories. They complain that they are never paid enough or on time; that paychecks are docked; and that overtime is mandatory, but often goes uncompensated. While these women sew clothes for retail giants, their mother cares for their numerous young children.

Next, the film focuses on a garment worker in her early 20s whose family sent her from a village to work in the factories when she was nine years old. She lives alone and her monthly wage is US$45, much less than the monthly cost of living in Bangladesh. After a day at the factory, the woman begins another shift as a volunteer at the union office run by the National Garment Workers Federation (NGWF).

Later in the film, there are protests organised by NGWF in Dhaka. Garment workers march through the streets demanding a fair living wage and safe working conditions despite the threat of losing their jobs for participating in the protest.

== Production and release ==
The Machinists tells the personal stories of three female Dhaka garment workers and the boss of a fledgling trade union in Dhaka, Bangladesh, intersect to portray the human cost of western high street fashion. It has unprecedented access into the garment factories and the lives of ordinary garment workers. The film was commissioned by Al Jazeera International and after a series of international broadcasts, was taken on by a number of international NGOs to promote issues of workers rights in the developing world.

On 30 May 2013, Hannan Majid and Richard York held an event in Herringham Hall at Regent's College in London's Inner Circle, to raise money for the National Garment Workers Federation in Bangladesh, which helps victims of the disaster and battles to win better conditions for garment workers. There was a screening of The Machinists plus a discussion on the issues.

The film was screened in cinemas by War on Want and Amnesty International as well as festival screenings which included East End Film Festival in London 2012 London International Labour Festival 2013, and The Workers Unite Festival 2013 and 2014 in New York.

== Reception ==
Julie Flynn Badal of The Huffington Post described The Machinists as "a visual document of the exploitation of garment workers in Bangladesh. The film gives voice to three young people working in the factories in Dhaka."

Indybay said, "This film tells this story through illuminating the lives of these workers and why the recent industrial disasters are a logical result of the corruption and corporate control of the government of Bangladesh."

== Tears in the Fabric ==
After the 2013 Rana Plaza tragedy, in 2014, Majid and York returned to Bangladesh to make Tears in the Fabric. Since the release of The Machinists, Rainbow Collective has built strong ties with the NGWF, who were instrumental in securing the access and characters for the new film.

== See also ==
- 2013 Savar building collapse
