= Jyotirmoy Barua =

Bangladeshi Lawyer and Human Rights Activist

Jyotirmoy Barua is a Bangladeshi lawyer and human rights activist.

== Early life ==
Barua was born on 16 September 1976 in Cox's Bazar District, Bangladesh. He has two bachelors in law, one from the University of Calcutta and another from the Northumbria University.

== Career ==
Barua is a member of the Dhaka Bar Association, Cox's Bazar Bar Association, and South Asians for Human Rights. He is a legal advisor of the Bangladesh Legal Aid and Services Trust. He filed a petition with the High Court Division questioning the lack of action by police during the 2012 Ramu violence. He represented Adhikari Shuvo and Rasel Parvez, bloggers who had been charged with hurting religious sentiments in 2013.

Barua accused law enforcement agencies of killing people extrajudicially in anti-terrorism operations after the 2016 Dhaka attack. He represented two journalists from Myanmar in 2017 who were detained working on a tourist visa. Barua and Tanim Hussain Shawon represented Rehnuma Ahmed in a petition to send her husband, photographer Shahidul Alam, who had been jailed for making comments critical of the government, to a hospital for medical treatment in August 2018. Barua wrote against enforced disappearance in 2020 representing victim Shafiqul Islam Kajol. He signed a statement along with 42 activists calling on the president of Bangladesh to initiate investigations against the commissioners of the Bangladesh Election Commission over the 2020 Bangladesh Election Commission scandal. He called for the abolishment of the Digital Security Act. He condemned Bangladesh Police questioning journalist Zillur Rahman. He represented writer Mushtaq Ahmed and cartoonist Ahmed Kabir Kishore. He represented Professor Morshed Hasan Khan of the University of Dhaka.

Barua is a board member of ActionAid Bangladesh. In July 2024, he condemned the detention of student activists agitating for quota reforms in civil service recruitment by the Detective Branch.

Following the increase of violence against women under the Muhammad Yunus led Interim government, Barua said, "Such incidents are increasing because the government is completely incapable of maintaining law and order". On mob lynching people. he said, "After the dictator (Sheikh Hasina) was deposed through an uprising, a group of people now believe that they can dispense justice as they want and the authorities would comply with whatever they say".
