= Traid (charity) =

UK charity

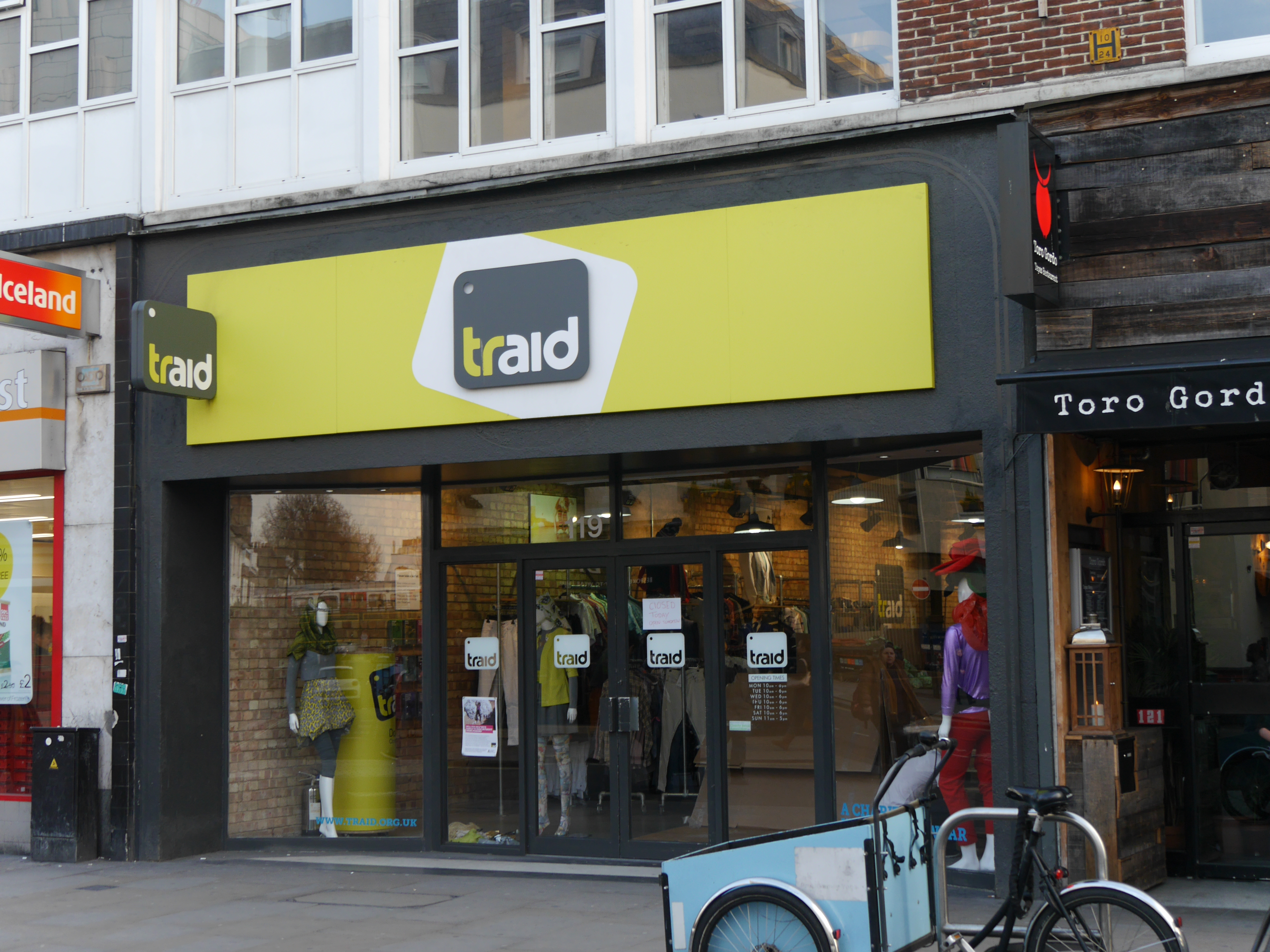
Traid shop, King Street, Hammersmith, London

Traid (previously Textile Recycling for Aid and International Development) is a UK charity with twelve shops in the London area, a free home collection service for clothing donations, as well as a network of over 700 clothing banks. Through collecting, curating and reselling clothes, they keep clothes in use for longer, and fund global projects supporting people working in the fashion industry, from organic cotton farmers to garment workers.

They have partnerships with various councils including Brent Council, offering their free home collection service to residents.
