= Yasmin Ali Haque =

Yasmin Ali Haque is a human rights activist and the UNICEF country representative to India.

== Early life ==
Haque graduated from Dhaka Medical College and did a masters in health system management from the University of London.

== Career ==
In 1996, Haque joined UNICEF Bangladesh.

In 2006, Haque was working in UNICEF Sri Lanka.

Haque served as the Deputy UNICEF representative in Sri Lanka from 2010 to 2013.

From 2007 to 2010, Haque served as the UNICEF representative in Ghana.

Haque served as the UNICEF representative in South Sudan from 2010 to 2013.

In July 2017, Haque was appointed the UNICEF representative in India. She had been serving as the Deputy Director of Emergency Programmes based at the UNICEF Headquarters in New York City. She is a founding member of the Refugee and Migratory Movements Research Unit.

Haque said that India was making improvements in healthcare in 2018. She said more girls than boys die during early childhood in India.

In June 2021, Haque launched Young Warrior Movement to encourage young people to participate in the recovery of India from COVID-19 pandemic. She talked about the detrimental effect of the pandemic on education in India. She called on the Indian government to take action against child labor. She described climate change as a children's right issue.
