= Northern Film School =

Film school in Leeds, England

Coordinates: 53.801°N 1.548°W

- Established: 1970; 56 years ago
- Location: Leeds, West Yorkshire, England
- Website: Official website

The Northern Film School is part of the Leeds Beckett University Leeds School of Arts. It is one of the largest full-time film schools in the UK, offering both bachelor's and master's degrees, and is situated in the city centre of Leeds. The school was established in 1970.

== History ==
As far back as the late 1960s, the nationally recognised Leeds Polytechnic Film Unit played a part in launching the careers of several luminaries of the British Film Industry. In 1991, it became The Northern School of Film and Television, before changing its name to The Northern Film School, offering courses in screenwriting and film production.

Notable alumni of the film school include Tunji Akinsehinwa, Peter Cattaneo, Nazrin Choudhury, Kim Crowther, Simon Crowther, Jeremy Dyson, Mark Herman, Alison Hume, Katarzyna Klimkiewicz, Bharat Nalluri, Faisal A. Qureshi, Chi Thai, Natasha Sayce-Zelem, Mohamed Al-Daradji and Fabian Wagner.

The school later merged with Leeds Metropolitan University, but still retained its status as a film school. Unlike the larger film schools, such as the National Film School and the London Film School, the merge offered students a film school experience at an affordable university fee.

== Influence ==
The Northern Film School is the largest of its kind in the north of England.

The school has close working relationships with Screen Yorkshire and ITV participates in local, regional, national and international film festivals.

The Hollywood Reporter named the school as one of the "5 film schools to watch" in 2014.

The school also sponsors the Local Young Film-maker award, an event included in the local Young People's Film Festival.

The school regularly has student work screened during the Leeds International Film Festival.

== Resources ==
In 2005, the school moved into a new facility in the Electric Press building on Millennium Square in Leeds. The building holds two studios fitted for shooting on student-built sets. It also has film-making equipment ranging from 16mm film, Digital Video and High Definition Digital Video.

In 2017, the school announced plans to move into a brand new £75 million creative arts building, as part of Leeds Beckett University in 2020. The flagship building will be home to 1,850 students and staff, who are currently spread across various separate locations in the city.

Being situated in Leeds, it is also close to ProVision Equipment Hire and the Leeds Studios. Past student productions have made use of these companies, as well as the surrounding landscape of the Yorkshire countryside.

The school has recently begun offering fully funded PhD scholarships. The first recipient of this scholarship is Natasha Parcei.

In 2018, the former Head of Screenwriting at the Northern Film School (2000–2006), Alby James, was appointed an OBE for services to film, theatre and broadcasting.
