= Sumaiya Khair =

Bangladeshi Law professor, and human rights activist

Sumaiya Khair is a law professor, researcher, and human rights activist. She is the former chair of the Department of Law at the University of Dhaka. She is an advisor to the executive committee of Transparency International Bangladesh. She is a member of the Constitution Reform Commission. She is a former deputy executive director of Transparency International Bangladesh.

== Early life ==
Khair did her bachelors and master's in law at the University of Dhaka in 1984 and 1985. He completed her PhD at the University of East London.

== Career ==
Khair joined the University of Dhaka as a lecturer on 1 January 1990. She was promoted to Assistant Professor in 1994.

Khair was promoted to Associate Professor in 2002. She joined Eastern University as an adjunct professor. She was promoted to full professor at the University of Dhaka in 2005.

In January 2009, Khair was appointed chairman of the Department of Law at the University of Dhaka. She served as the chairman till 2011. She received the University Grants Commission Award in 2011. She became a deputy executive director of Transparency International Bangladesh in 2013. She served as the editor of the Dhaka University Law Journal.

Khair was appointed an advisor to the executive committee of Transparency International Bangladesh in 2017.

In January 2020, Khair signed a letter protesting the legal case against the editor of Prothom Alo Matiur Rahman over the death of school student at an event of the Prothom Alo. She signed a statement in 2021 demanding the release of Rozina Islam, a reporter of Prothom Alo. She called on the government to renew the registration of human rights organization Odhikar in 2022.

Following the fall of the Sheikh Hasina led Awami League government, Khair was made a member of the Constitution Reform Commission of the Muhammad Yunus led Interim government in October 2024.

== Bibliography ==
- Child Labour Revisited: Gender, Culture, Economics and Human Rights
- Legal Empowerment for the Poor and the Disadvantaged: Strategies Achievements and Challenges
- Governance and Integrity: The National Integrity Systems in Bangladesh
