= Badiul Alam Majumdar =

Bangladesh economist

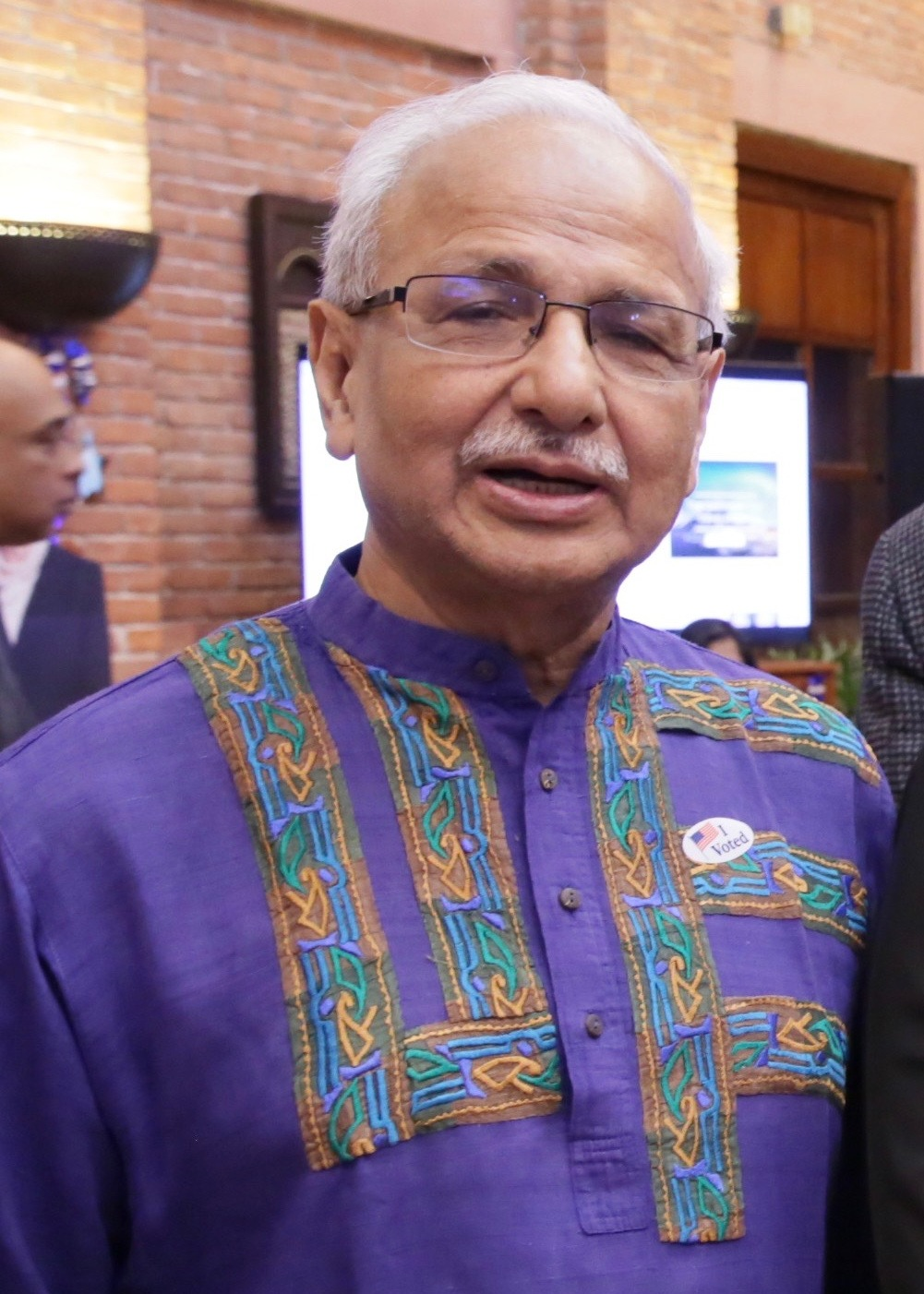
- Born: February 1946 (age 80); Laksam Upazila, Comilla, British India
- Education: Case Western Reserve University
- Known for: Economist, Development worker, Political analyst and Election expert
- Notable work: SHUJAN

Badiul Alam Majumdar (born February 1946) is a Bangladeshi economist, activist and election expert. He is the vice president and country director of the US-based charity The Hunger Project. He is the founder-secretary of a civil society organization named Citizens for Good Governance (SHUJAN).

In 2024, Majumdar was tasked by the Bangladesh interim government to oversee reforms of the county's electoral system after the end of Sheikh Hasina's authoritarian regime.

Badiul's biography, Today I Saw a Revolution: From Grassroots to Global Change: The Badiul Majumdar Story was published in October, 2024.

== Early life ==
Majumdar was born in February 1946 at Polaiya village at Laksham Upazila in Comilla of the then British India (now Bangladesh). The period in which Baidul was born was also known as the Bengal famine, where three million people died of hunger. He completed his Higher Secondary School Certificate in 1962 from and graduated from Dhaka University in 1967. He earned his post graduate degree from the same university in 1968. He completed a graduate fellowship at Claremont Graduate University from 1970 to 1971. Later, he obtained his PhD degree in economics from Case Western Reserve University.

== Family ==
Badiul Alam is the father of Mahbubul Alam Majumdar.
