= Tofail Ahmed (professor) =

Bangladeshi political scientist (1954–2025)

- তোফায়েল আহমেদ
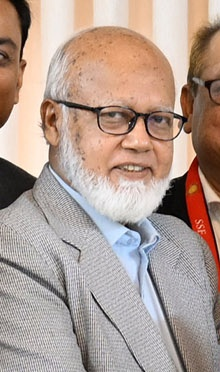
- Ahmed in 2025
- Born: 1 March 1954; Chittagong District, East Bengal, Dominion of Pakistan
- Died: 8 October 2025 (aged 71); Dhaka, Bangladesh
- Education: University of Chittagong; Swansea University

Tofail Ahmed (1 March 1954 – 8 October 2025) was a Bangladeshi academic and local governance expert. He was the chairman of the Local Government Reform Commission. He was a professor and head of the department of public administration at the University of Chittagong. He was the chairperson of the Knowledge and Action Network Worldwide (Knowledge Trust).

== Early life ==
Ahmed was born on 1 March 1954 in Fatehpur of Hathazari in Chittagong District in the then East Bengal. He completed his SSC and HSC at the Fatehabad High School and Chittagong College respectively. He completed his bachelor's degree and master's degree in politics and administration at the University of Chittagong in 1976 and 1977 respectively. He earned his second master's at in Social Sector Planning and Management in 1981 and his PhD in Development Studies in 1991 from Swansea University.

== Career ==
Ahmed joined Fatehpur High School as an assistant teacher in 1975. From 1976 to 1978, he worked at Agrani Bank. From 1979 to 1981, he worked at the Chittagong Port Authority.

Ahmed joined Bangladesh Academy for Rural Development as a faculty in 1981; where he worked till 1994. From 1994 to 2007, he worked at the University of Chittagong. He was a Governance Adviser of Shiree from 2007 to 2008. He was a member of the Local Government Commission in 2009. Ahmed was an advisor on Local Governance for the United Nations Development Programme from 2009 to 2014.

From 2014 to 2015, Ahmed was a director of the BRAC Institute of Governance and Development at Brac University. From 2015 to 2016, he was the governance director of Manusher Jonno Foundation. He was a professor of political science at North South University. From 2018 to 2021, he was the vice chancellor of Britannia University. He was awarded the Mercantile Bank Award in 2018 for his contribution to education. He served on the Bangladesh Planning Commission.

In 2020, Ahmed criticized the framing of charges against Matiur Rahman, editor of Prothom Alo, over the death of school student by electrocution at an event of the newspaper. In 2022, Ahmed's name was suggested for the post of commissioner of the Bangladesh Election Commission. In October 2023, he called on political parties to hold dialogue to avoid conflict at an event of Shushashoner Jonno Nagorik.

After the fall of the Sheikh Hasina–led Awami League government, the Muhammad Yunus–led interim government made Ahmed a member of the newly created Electoral System Reform Commission in October 2024. He was appointed chairman of the Local Government Reform Commission.

== Death ==
Ahmed died from heart disease on 8 October 2025, at the age of 71.

== Bibliography ==
- Gender Dimensions in Local Government Institutions (2003)
- Bangladesh: Reform Agenda for Local Governance
