= Transparency International Bangladesh =

Civil society organization

- Emblem of Transparency International Bangladesh
- Abbreviation: TIB
- Formation: 1996
- Type: Non-governmental organisation
- Headquarters: Dhaka, Bangladesh
- Region served: Bangladesh
- Official language: Bengali
- Executive Director: Iftekharuzzaman
- Main organ: Board of Trustees
- Affiliations: Transparency International
- Website: ti-bangladesh.org

Transparency International Bangladesh (TIB) is the Bangladeshi branch of the Berlin-based Transparency International, a civil society organisation dedicated to fighting against corruption.

== History ==
TIB started its activities in 1997, under founding chairman Syed Humayun Kabir.

In 1999, it started its Investigative Journalism Awards (IJA) programme to recognise and encourage in-depth reporting on corruption.

In 2016, it criticised new government rules on NGOs that received foreign funding. It also asked the government to not take a 2 billion dollar development loan from the world Bank. This law was created after TIB Executive Director Iftekharuzzaman called the country's Parliament a 'puppet show stage'.

== Major work areas ==
- Research and Policy
- Civic Engagement
- Outreach and Communication
- Right to Information
- Citizen Charter
- Climate Finance Governance
- Water Integrity

== Board of trustees ==
Board of Trustees, the highest policy making body of Transparency International Bangladesh, comprises:

- Monsur Ahmed Choudhuri - chairperson
- Mahfuz Anam - treasurer
- Susmita Chakma - member
- Philip Gain - member
- Banasree Paul - member
- Faruque Ahmed - member
- Tahera Yasmin - member
- Manzoor Hasan - member
- Selim Raihan - member

== Reports ==
- 12th National Parliament Election Process Tracking

== See also ==
- Corruption in Bangladesh
- Anti-Corruption Commission
- Information Commission
