= Shahdeen Malik =

Bangladeshi lawyer

- Born: Shahdeen Malik; Sariwala village, Bishwanath Upazila, Sylhet District, Bangladesh
- Other name: Dr. Shahdeen Malik
- Occupations: Lawyer, constitutional expert, professor
- Years active: 1980–present
- Known for: Lawyer at the Supreme Court of Bangladesh; independent director of Pubali Bank Limited
- Notable work: Public Interest Litigation in South Asia – Rights in Search of Remedies (1997)

Shahdeen Malik (Bengali: শাহদীন মালিক) is a Bangladeshi lawyer, eminent jurist, constitutional expert, and legal activist. He is currently a professor in the Asia Pacific University.

== Early life and education ==
Dr. Shahdeen Malik was born in Saruala village of Biswanath Upazila under Sylhet district of Bangladesh. Malik's father, Abdul Malik Chowdhury, was the chief conservatory officer of the Forest Department. Malik obtained LL.B (pass) degree from University of Dhaka. Later, he completed his master's in law at the Patrice Lumumba Peoples' Friendship University of Russia in 1979. He obtained another LL.M degree from the University of Pennsylvania Law School in 1984. He completed his PhD at SOAS, University of London in 1994.

== Career ==
Shahdeen Malik is a senior advocate of the Supreme Court of Bangladesh and head of chambers of a law firm named Ergo Legal Counsel. Shahdeen Malik's practice spans over two decades in the Supreme Court and the district court where he was enrolled in 2000 and 1996 respectively. Malik started his practice at Bangladesh Supreme Court in 2003. Before entering law profession, Malik joined the University of Dhaka in 1980 as a lecturer.

Malik joined Bangladesh Legal Aid and Services Trust in 1990. He wrote a book named Public Interest Litigation in South Asia - Rights in Search of Remedies in 1997.

Malik was a founder director and faculty at the law school of BRAC University.

From 2010 to 2019, Malik served at the Bangladesh Institute of Law and International Affairs as an honorary director. He criticised the Fifteen Amendment to the Constitution of Bangladesh, which abolished the caretaker government on 19 July after praising it on 10 July 2011. In 2013, he was the lawyer of the Bangladesh Election Commission.

Malik is a trustee board member of the Centre for Policy Dialogue. He is a member of the governing body of the ActionAid Bangladesh, and the Refugee and Migratory Movement Research Unit. He is an independent director of Pubali Bank Limited. He is an adjunct professor at Gono University.

In February 2022, Malik withdrew his name from consideration for the next Election Commissioner of Bangladesh. He described the speech by the minister of law, Anisul Huq, in Geneva defending the human rights record of the government as embarrassing. He is currently working as a professor at Asia Pacific University.

=== Resignation of the Constitution Reform Commission ===
On 11 September 2024, the interim government of Bangladesh announced the formation of six reform commissions. Among them, Constitutional Reform Commission was to be headed by him.

The announcement was made by the Chief Adviser of the interim government, Muhammad Yunus, who presented a comprehensive plan for reforms in various sectors in a national address.

However, within a week of assuming responsibility, on 10 September 2024, He stepped down from his position as head of the commission. Subsequently, the government announced that he had resigned due to "personal and professional commitments." According to the notification published the same day, Ali Riaz was appointed as his successor.
