= 2025 Dhaka garment factory fire =

2025 fire in Bangladesh

- Time: c. 11:00 a.m. – 12:00 p.m. BST
- Location: Mirpur Thana, Dhaka, Bangladesh
- Type: Fire, chemical accident
- Cause: Under investigation
- Deaths: 16
- Injuries: Multiple
- Property damage: Garment factory Chemical warehouse

On 14 October 2025, a fire broke out on the third floor of a garment factory nearby a chemical warehouse located in the Mirpur area of Dhaka, killing at least 16 people and injuring several others. The blaze was the deadliest since 2022, when a container depot caught fire and exploded in Sitakunda Upazila, Chittagong District, killing at least 47 people.

== Background ==
Bangladesh has the world's second largest garment industry after China, making up over 10% of the country's gross domestic product, earning about $40 billion a year from exports, mainly to the United States and Europe, and employing approximately 4 million workers, mostly women. Since the Rana Plaza collapse in 2013, the most fatal industrial accident in the history of Bangladesh, which caused 1,134 deaths and whose building maintained several factories, the working conditions have been improved.

Large fires are relatively common in the densely populated country, frequently attributed to lax safety standards and inadequate infrastructure. Hundreds of people have been lost their lives in similar incidents over the decades.

== Fire ==
According to eyewitness, the fire occurred between 11 a.m. and midday local time, on the third floor of a four-storey factory, spreading to a close by chemical warehouse storing chlorine powder, plastic and hydrogen peroxide. All 16 bodies were found on the second and third floors and burned beyond recognition.

Local media reported that up until 9 p.m., the warehouse continued to burn, despite the blaze at the factory having been extinguished after three hours. Fire service director Mohammad Tajul Islam Chowdhury said the victims probably died "instantly" after inhaling "highly toxic gas"."The chemical explosion caused a flashover that released toxic gas, leaving many unconscious and trapping them inside. They couldn't escape either upward or downward," he said. It was unclear what chemicals were housed in the warehouse. He added that neither the factory nor the warehouse had any fire safety plan.

Preliminary analysis showed the factory had a tin roof with a locked grilled door, impeding the workers to reach the upper level.

== Reactions ==
Outside the buildings, family members were seen gathered waiting for information, with many of them holding photos of the relatives.

The chief adviser Muhammad Yunus-led interim government of Bangladesh expressed its condolences and urged authorities to investigate and support victims and families.

As part of the investigation, police and military officers have begun searches to locate the owners of the factory and the warehouse.

== See also ==
- 2025 Tennessee manufacturing plant explosion – an explosion at a manufacturing plant in the U.S. state of Tennessee that occurred four days prior
- Rupganj factory fire
- February 2019 Dhaka fire
- FR Tower fire
- 2005 Dhaka garment factory collapse
- 2012 Dhaka garment factory fire
- 2012 Pakistan factory fires
- 2013 Thane building collapse
- Accord on Fire and Building Safety in Bangladesh
- Alliance for Bangladesh Worker Safety
