= 2005 Narayanganj garment factory fire =

Fire in Narayanganj, Bangladesh

- 2005 Narayanganj garment factory fire (Bangladesh)
- Date: 6 January 2005
- Location: Siddhirganj, Narayanganj District, Bangladesh; 23.6538°N 90.5022°E
- Deaths: 28
- Injuries: 50+

The 2005 Narayanganj garment factory fire broke out on the night of 6 January 2005, in the Shaan Knitting and Processing Limited factory in the Siddhirganj of Narayanganj, Bangladesh. An electrical short circuit on the first floor trapped over 250 night-shift workers inside the four-story facility after management locked the primary exit doors and emergency escapes. At least 28 people died in the conflagration, and over 50 were injured.

== Background ==
Shaan Knitting and Processing Limited operated out of a four-story building in Godnail Jelepara, Siddhirganj. On the night of Thursday, 6 January 2005, over 250 workers were inside the facility operating the night shift. The workforce was comprised predominantly of young men and women, many of whom resided in nearby rented accommodations. In the days preceding the disaster, relations between the workforce and factory management were strained due to an ongoing financial dispute. Workers reported that the factory owner, Rahmat Ullah, had failed to disburse their monthly wages for the preceding five months. Management had agreed to pay the accumulated salary arrears on Friday, 7 January 2005 the morning immediately following the scheduled night shift.

== The incident ==
At approximately 9:00 PM on 6 January 2005, a fire broke out at Shaan Knitting and Processing Limited (also reported as Sun Knitting and Processing Factory), a four-story knitwear facility in Godnail Jelepara, Siddhirganj, Narayanganj. According to the Fire Service and Civil Defence, the conflagration was triggered by an electrical short circuit on the first floor while over 250 workers were inside operating the night shift.

As dense smoke and flames spread rapidly through the building, escaping workers encountered blocked emergency routes. Management had locked both the primary front entrance gate and the second-floor rear emergency exit, leaving only a single narrow side door available, which permitted only one or two individuals to pass at a time. Trapped inside, many workers fled to the second floor attempting to reach the rear exit, only to find it secured. Cut off by thick smoke filling the stairwells, numerous workers suffocated or were trampled in the surging crowd, while a small group escaped by breaking open a first-floor window.

Nearby residents and local volunteers initiated early rescue efforts prior to the arrival of fire services at approximately 12:10 AM on 7 January. Six firefighting units, including units from Narayanganj, Demra, Sadarghat, and the Fire Brigade headquarters in Dhaka were deployed, comprising around 100 firefighters. Emergency operations were hindered by heavy smoke, extreme heat, and structural hazards. Rescuers recovered 20 charred bodies overnight and retrieved two additional victims the following morning. Firefighters brought the inferno under control at 3:40 PM on Friday after an 18-hour operation. Fire officials later noted that although fire-extinguishing equipment was present on every floor of the building, none had been utilized during the disaster.

== Casualties and Investigation ==
The disaster resulted 28 worker deaths and more than 50 injuries. The recovered bodies were heavily charred and disfigured, complicating immediate identification. Emergency responders visually identified only a few victims among the remains, including three males, one female, and at least two children. Among the individuals identified by police were Sufia (18), Nargis (18), Jahangir (30), Dil Mohammad (30), and Mamun (25). Following autopsies conducted at Narayanganj General Hospital, the deceased were buried at the Pathantuli graveyard in Siddhirganj. In addition to the confirmed fatalities, local authorities compiled a list of 27 missing workers.

The Bangladesh Knitwear Manufacturers and Exporters Association (BKMEA) estimated total monetary damage to exceed Tk 50 crore. Subsequent inquiries by emergency authorities highlighted severe regulatory non-compliance and operational safety failures at the plant. Fire Service and Civil Defence officials reported that the four-story facility had been constructed in violation of the National Building Code. Investigators also noted that although functional fire-extinguishing equipment was positioned on every floor, none of it was deployed during the emergency. The high mortality rate was directly attributed to management locking the main front entrance and rear emergency exits. Although several employees raised suspicions of arson related to five months of unpaid wage payment, factory owner Rahmat Ullah denied the claims, and fire officials found no preliminary evidence of sabotage. Two separate investigative committees were instituted by the local district administration and the Fire Service and Civil Defence to examine the root causes of the disaster and evaluate the failure of safety protocols.

== See also ==
- 2010 Dhaka fire
- 2012 Dhaka garment factory fire
- February 2019 Dhaka fire
- 2021 Narayanganj factory fire
- 2025 Dhaka garment factory fire
