= 2022 Sitakunda fire =

Large fire and explosions in Bangladesh

- Date: 4 June 2022 to 7 June 2022
- Time: Start of fire: ~21:00 BST (15:00 UTC); First explosion: ~23:45 BST (17:45 UTC)
- Location: BM Container Depot, Kadamrasul area, Sitakunda Upazila, Chittagong District, Bangladesh; 22.4550°N 91.7375°E
- Type: Fire and explosions
- Deaths: ≥47 (Note: NTV reported that the number of deaths rose to 47 after two of the injured victims died in hospital on the ninth day, while The Business Standard reported that those two deaths brought the total to 48. The Dhaka Tribune also reported the two deaths, but added that additional remains were found at the depot on the tenth day, and stated that the death toll had risen to 49.)
- Injuries: ~450

External images
- A firefighter facing the fire at night
- Fighting the fire the next day
- The fire as seen from a distance
- A victim being transported to hospital

On the night of 4 June 2022, a fire and subsequent explosions at a container depot in Sitakunda Upazila, Chittagong District, Bangladesh killed at least 47 people and injured around 450 others.

The incident occurred at BM Container Depot in the Kadamrasul area of Sitakunda Upazila. After a fire started in the loading area at around 21:00 BST (15:00 UTC), a massive explosion occurred at around 23:45 BST (17:45 UTC), triggering more explosions that spread across the depot caused by ignition of chemicals stored in the containers. The force of the explosions affected buildings several kilometres away, and one witness stated that the explosions caused a rain of fireballs.

The head of Bangladesh's fire service stated that there was hydrogen peroxide in the depot which prevented the fire from being controlled. The following afternoon, the fire was still burning and explosions were still being heard. The army had also joined efforts to fight the fire. The fire was finally brought under control and ended on the afternoon of 7 June 2022.

== Background ==
BM Container Depot, a private Dutch–Bangladesh joint venture, is an inland container depot (ICD) that has been dealing with goods for import and export since 2011. Mujibur Rahman, the director of the depot, stated that about 600 people were employed there. The depot is one of 19 ICDs in the country.

Ruhul Amin Sikder, a spokesperson for the Bangladesh Inland Container Depots Association (BICDA), stated that the depot covered about 30 acres. The ICD had a capacity of 6,500 twenty-foot equivalent units (TEUs), and was holding about 4,300 TEUs (Note: This value includes empty containers.) worth of containers on the day of the fire. Many of these were for the garment industry and contained hazardous chemicals, including hydrogen peroxide.

As safety regulations are not strictly enforced in Bangladesh, fires are common in the country.

== Fire and explosions ==
Local emergency services and sources reported that the fire began inside the loading area of the depot around 21:00 BST (15:00 UTC). Hundreds of first responders and volunteers quickly arrived at the depot and began to fight the fire.

The first explosion was massive and occurred around 23:45 BST (17:45 UTC), enveloping many of those on the scene and sending many others flying through the air. This initial explosion then triggered multiple subsequent explosions. Several of the containers held flammable chemicals, and when the fire engulfed them, they caused explosions and the spread of the fire.

The explosions shook the ground in the surrounding area and shattered windows of nearby buildings. The force of the explosions was large enough that it affected buildings kilometres away. The fumes from the fire were also toxic due to the chemicals involved, making the firefighting effort more difficult. A district administrator stated that the fire in the depot had spread to at least seven acres. The army stated that 250 troops were deploying sandbags to keep chemicals from spilling into the Indian Ocean. Fire officials stated that explosions continued well into the next day, complicating efforts to fight the fire.

An eyewitness stated that the explosion "sent fireballs in[to] the sky" that then fell "like rain", and that one piece of debris flew about half a kilometre (0.3 mi) from the location of the fire to near where he was. One victim stated that he was standing inside the depot when the explosion threw him about 10 metres (30 ft), and that his hands and legs were burnt. The main explosion was reportedly heard from 30 to 40 km (20 to 25 mi) away. Many Bangladeshis compared this explosion to the 2020 Beirut explosion.

== Casualties ==
At least 47 people were killed and around 450 others injured in the incident. A Chittagong health official stated that at least 350 of the injured were at Chittagong Medical College Hospital (CMCH). Many of those injured were in critical condition. Many of those deceased were so badly burnt that a CMCH official stated that DNA profiling is needed to determine their identities. Volunteers stated that there were still more bodies remaining in the depot.

Brigadier General Main Uddin, Director General of the Bangladesh Fire Service & Civil Defence, reported that five firefighters were amongst those killed, and twenty-one amongst those injured. A number of journalists who were livestreaming on social media were still missing.

A Facebook streamer, Oliur Rahman Nayan, a 20-year-old worker at the BM Container Depot, died while live streaming. He started broadcasting the fire incident on Saturday night but could not continue for long as there was an explosion that severed his internet connection and ended the broadcast.

== Damage ==
BICDA spokesperson Sikder estimated that more than US$20 million worth of empty containers and more than US$90 million worth of containers with goods were destroyed in the disaster. Some of the goods stored in the depot were to be shipped for clothing brand H&M, and about 100 TEUs worth of goods were to be shipped for an unnamed European brand, but it is unclear if any of these goods were damaged. Major (retired) Shamsul Haider Siddique the general manager of BM Container Depot, reported all the CCTV footage were destroyed in the fire.

== Investigation ==
Multiple committees were formed to investigate the incident.

During the parliamentary session, MP Harunur Rashid suggested the government form an impartial inquiry committee to find out whether the fire was intentional. He also criticized the government for not arresting the owner of the BM container depot in the incident.

On 6 July 2022, the investigation committee submitted its investigation report to the Chittagong Divisional Commissioner. The report noted that the depot contained hydrogen peroxide. The owner of the depot was blamed for the explosion, citing a hydrogen peroxide explosion. The report also recommended amending the current DG Cargo Act, 1953.

== Response ==
Sheikh Hasina, the Prime Minister of Bangladesh, was in "deep shock and sorrow" due to the severity of the incident, and requested that authorities provide treatment to those injured. The government announced that families of those deceased would receive 50,000 BDT (522.90 EUR (Note: EUR value based on exchange rate of 95.62 BDT/EUR on 5 June 2022.)) in compensation, while those injured would receive 20,000 BDT (209.16 EUR).

On 6 June, the Communist Party of Bangladesh organized a protest in Dhaka. At the rally, they called the incident a "murder" and demanded appropriate punishment for the culprit. Rumeen Farhana criticized the government in the parliament session over the incident. Comparing the incident to the act of murder, she said that the director of BM Container Depot is a member of the ruling party Awami League, who was responsible for storing flammable substances in the depot in dangerous condition without following the rules and regulations.

== See also ==
- 2010 Dhaka fire: Known as Nimtoli tragedy, killing at least 124
- 2012 Dhaka garment factory fire: at least 117 died trapped behind locked exits
- 2013 Dhaka garment factory collapse: Bangladesh's worst industrial disaster, which killed 1,134
- 2019 Dhaka fire: at least 80 died in a dense section of Old Dhaka
- 2021 Rupganj factory fire: at least 52 died in a food and drink factory near Dhaka
- 2022 Hapur chemical plant explosion: another fatal industrial fire on the Indian subcontinent that occurred on the same day as the Sitakunda fire
- 2025 Shahid Rajaee port explosion
