= Dhaka fire =

Dhaka fire may refer to the following:

- 2010 Dhaka fire
- 2012 Dhaka garment factory fire
- February 2019 Dhaka fire
- FR Tower fire, in March 2019
- 2023 Dhaka Bangabazar fire in April 2023
