= 2005 Dhaka garment factory collapse =

Building collapse in Dhaka, Bangladesh

- Date: 11 April 2005
- Time: 00:45 am BST (UTC+06:00)
- Location: Savar Upazila, Dhaka District, Bangladesh
- Also known as: Spectrum garment factory collapse
- Deaths: 73
- Injuries: ~80>

The 2005 Dhaka garment factory collapse or Spectrum garment factory collapse was a structural failure that occurred on Monday, 11 April 2005 in the Savar Upazila of Dhaka, Bangladesh where a nine-story commercial building collapsed. The site is located about 30 km northwest of Dhaka. The explosion of a boiler on the ground floor triggered the collapse. The owner of the building was Shahriar Sayeed Husain, a Bangladeshi businessman. He is married to Farah Mahbub, a judge of Bangladesh High Court.

== See also ==
- 2025 Dhaka garment factory fire
- 2012 Dhaka garment factory fire
- Pakistan garment factory fires (2012)
- 2013 Savar building collapse – another garment factory collapse in Dhaka
- Thane building collapse (2013)
- Accord on Factory and Building Safety in Bangladesh
- Alliance for Bangladesh Worker Safety
