= 2019 Dhaka fire =

2019 Dhaka fire may refer to:

- February 2019 Dhaka fire
- FR Tower fire, in March 2019
