= Textile industry in Bangladesh =

Textile and apparel manufacturing sector in Bangladesh

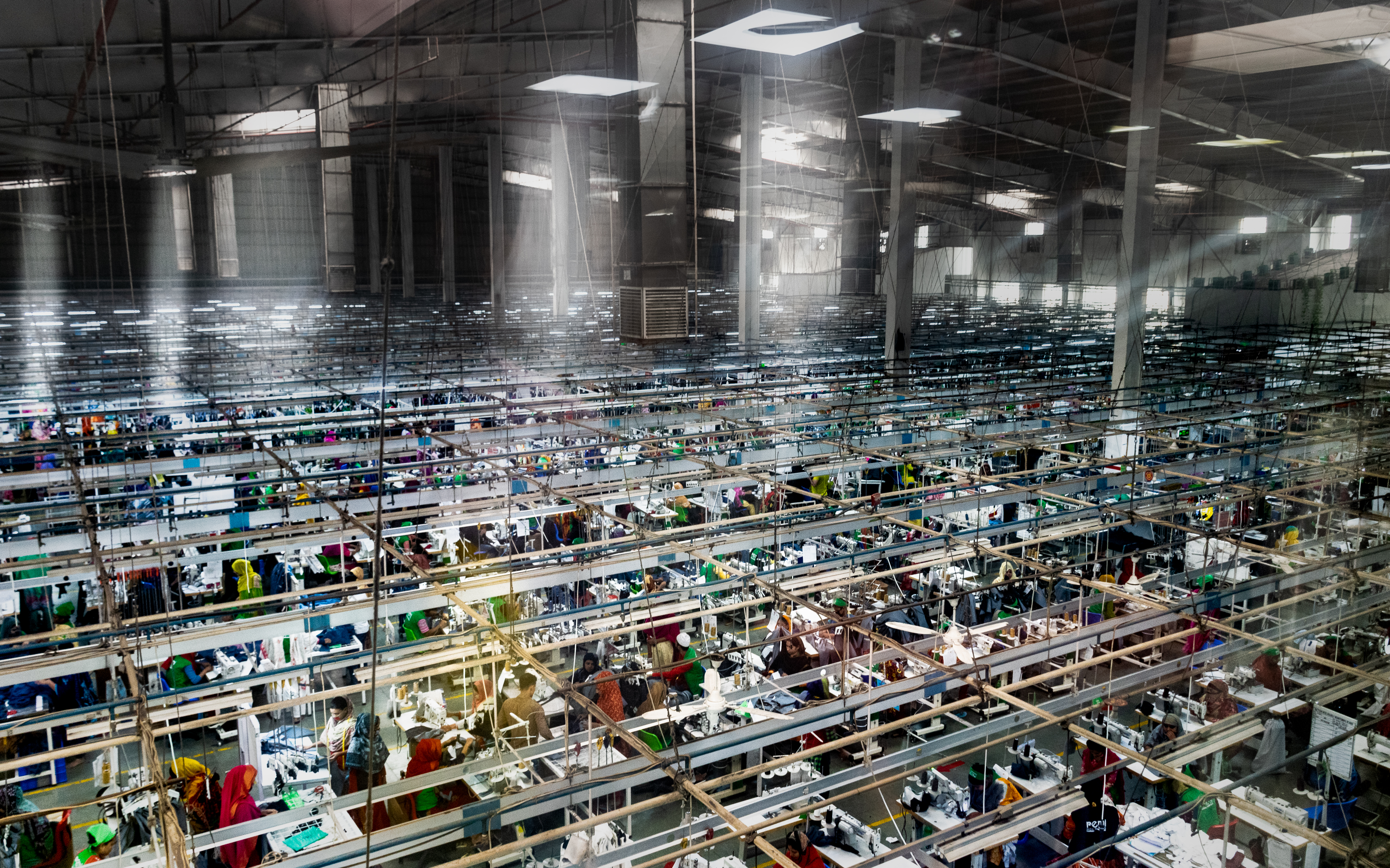
A garment manufacturing facility in Bangladesh

The textile industry in Bangladesh comprises primary textile manufacturing, including spinning, weaving and knitting, and dyeing, printing and finishing, together with the country's export-oriented ready-made garment (RMG) industry.

The RMG sector is Bangladesh's largest merchandise-export industry. In fiscal year 2025–26, garment exports were US$38.70 billion, accounting for about 80.6 percent of Bangladesh's US$48 billion in merchandise exports. According to World Trade Organization data, Bangladesh was the world's second-largest apparel exporter in 2024, behind China, with exports of US$38.48 billion and a 6.9 percent share of global apparel exports.

== Historical development ==
=== Earlier textile production ===
The region that is now Bangladesh has a long history of textile production. Dhaka and surrounding areas were historically associated with fine cotton textiles, particularly muslin, while modern power-driven textile manufacturing in Bengal developed during the early twentieth century. At the Partition of India in 1947, the territory that became East Pakistan contained about 11 composite textile mills with spinning and weaving facilities.

Textile capacity expanded during the East Pakistan period, although much of the modern industrial sector was affected by ageing equipment and changes in ownership and investment.

=== Nationalisation and privatisation ===
After the independence of Bangladesh, large textile enterprises were nationalised under the Bangladesh Industrial Enterprises (Nationalisation) Order, 1972. The Bangladesh Textile Mills Corporation (BTMC) was established on 26 March 1972, and 74 nationalised mills were initially placed under it.

The government's industrial policy shifted towards greater private ownership during the late 1970s and early 1980s. Under the 1982 denationalisation programme, textile mills were returned or sold to private owners. By April 1983, 22 mills had been returned to former owners, leaving 37 in the public sector; about 40 percent of modern-sector spindles and 45 percent of looms were then privately owned.

=== Rise of export-oriented garment manufacturing ===
Bangladesh's export-oriented garment industry began developing in the late 1970s. An influential early venture was the collaboration between Desh Garments and South Korea's Daewoo. In 1979, Desh sent 130 Bangladeshi employees to Daewoo's factory in Busan for intensive training in production, supervision, management and export marketing. Garment production at Desh began in 1980. Many of the employees trained through the collaboration later moved to other firms or established businesses of their own, helping to spread production and management knowledge through the emerging garment industry.

Export growth was also supported by arrangements that allowed export-oriented factories to import intermediate inputs duty-free through bonded warehouses and to finance imports through back-to-back letters of credit.

International textile quotas also influenced the development of the industry. The Multi Fibre Arrangement and later the WTO Agreement on Textiles and Clothing regulated textile and clothing trade through country-specific restrictions. The WTO agreement and the remaining quota system ended on 1 January 2005, after which textile and clothing trade was brought under the normal rules of the General Agreement on Tariffs and Trade.

== Industry structure ==
=== Primary textile sector ===
The primary textile sector forms the principal domestic supply chain for apparel manufacturing. It includes spinning, fabric production, knitting and weaving, and dyeing, printing and finishing.

A 2026 report by the United States Department of Agriculture, using Bangladesh Textile Mills Association data, listed 526 spinning mills, 990 fabric-manufacturing units and 342 dyeing, printing and finishing facilities. The report stated that domestic spinning and textile operations supplied about 85 percent of the yarn required for knitwear and around 40 percent of the fabric used for woven garments.

Cotton remains the main raw material for much of the industry. Domestic cotton cultivation supplies less than 2 percent of Bangladesh's textile-industry demand, making the sector heavily dependent on imported raw cotton. The USDA estimated raw-cotton use at about 7.8 million 480-pound bales for marketing year 2025–26 after revising its earlier forecast down because of energy shortages and reduced textile production.

=== Ready-made garments ===
The ready-made garment industry comprises knitwear and woven apparel production for export. In fiscal year 2025–26, knitwear exports were US$20.62 billion and woven-garment exports were US$18.08 billion, for a combined US$38.70 billion.

The European Union remained the largest regional market in fiscal year 2025–26, purchasing US$19.06 billion of Bangladeshi apparel, equivalent to about 49 percent of RMG exports. The United States was the largest single-country market at US$7.74 billion, followed by the United Kingdom at US$4.39 billion.

Bangladesh's apparel production is concentrated in large manufacturing clusters around Dhaka, Gazipur, Narayanganj and Chattogram, supported by spinning, knitting, weaving, dyeing, finishing, accessories, packaging and logistics businesses.

== Employment and wages ==
The garment industry is one of Bangladesh's largest sources of formal industrial employment. A 2025 report by Better Work, a programme of the International Labour Organization and the International Finance Corporation, estimated that the industry employed about 4.2 million workers, around 54 percent of whom were women.

The expansion of garment manufacturing from the 1980s onward created large-scale formal employment opportunities for women, particularly migrants from rural areas. The proportion of women in the workforce has declined from the much higher levels reported during the industry's earlier decades, while women remain a majority of garment workers.

The minimum monthly wage for garment workers was set at Tk 12,500 in November 2023. The government subsequently increased the annual wage increment for garment workers from 5 percent to 9 percent, effective from 1 December 2024.

== Worker safety and labour standards ==
Industrial accidents in the garment sector led to major changes in factory-safety oversight. A fire at the Tazreen Fashions factory in November 2012 killed more than 110 workers. On 24 April 2013, the collapse of Rana Plaza in Savar, which housed five garment factories, killed at least 1,132 people and injured more than 2,500.

Following the Rana Plaza collapse, international brands and trade unions established the Accord on Fire and Building Safety in Bangladesh in 2013. Its programmes included structural, fire and electrical inspections, remediation, safety training and a worker complaints mechanism.

In June 2020, the Accord's Bangladesh operations were transferred to the RMG Sustainability Council (RSC), a national organisation involving industry, brands and trade unions. The Bangladesh Safety Agreement, which took effect in November 2023 under the International Accord framework, continues inspection, remediation, training and complaints programmes through the RSC.

As of 31 August 2026, the International Accord reported that its Bangladesh programme covered 1,759 factories employing about 2.8 million workers. It reported 76,009 inspections and an average remediation progress rate of 81 percent at covered factories.

== Sustainability ==
Environmental performance has become an increasing part of investment and buyer requirements in the textile and garment sector. In July 2026, The Business Standard reported that 290 Bangladeshi RMG factories had received Leadership in Energy and Environmental Design (LEED) certification, including 125 Platinum-rated and 145 Gold-rated facilities.

Environmental challenges extend beyond factory buildings. Textile dyeing, washing and finishing require substantial amounts of energy, water and process heat. A 2026 Centre for Policy Dialogue study covering 350 garment factories identified rising energy costs, gas shortages and decarbonisation requirements as growing competitiveness issues, and examined increased use of rooftop solar and more efficient machinery.

== Trade policy ==
Preferential market access has played an important role in Bangladesh's garment exports. As a least developed country, Bangladesh has received duty-free and quota-free access to the European Union under the Everything but Arms arrangement, helping make the EU the industry's largest regional market.

Bangladesh is scheduled by the United Nations to graduate from the least-developed-country category on 24 November 2026. In 2026, the government requested a three-year extension of the preparatory period. The UN Committee for Development Policy concluded that an extension could be appropriate subject to progress on structural reforms, and the matter remained for General Assembly action as of October 2026.

Under the European Union's renewed Generalised Scheme of Preferences, countries graduating from LDC status in 2026, including Bangladesh, are to continue receiving Everything but Arms preferences for three years after graduation, at least through the end of 2029 under the currently scheduled timetable.

== Challenges ==
The textile and apparel industries remain dependent on imported raw materials and reliable energy supplies. Domestic cotton production meets less than 2 percent of textile demand, while spinning, dyeing and finishing operations require large and continuous supplies of gas and electricity.

Severe gas and electricity shortages disrupted industrial production during 2026. Textile mills and garment factories in major manufacturing areas reported prolonged interruptions, reduced utilisation and temporary shutdowns during periods of low gas pressure. The USDA also reduced its 2025–26 estimates for cotton imports and domestic use, citing energy shortages and weaker garment production.

Other continuing challenges include dependence on a relatively concentrated group of export markets, pressure to move into higher-value and man-made-fibre products, financing costs, compliance requirements and competition from other major apparel-exporting countries.

== See also ==
- Textile arts of Bangladesh
- Bangladesh Textile Mills Corporation
- Bangladesh Handloom Board
- Bangladesh University of Textiles
- 2012 Dhaka garment factory fire
- 2013 Dhaka garment factory collapse
- Child labour in Bangladesh
- Economy of Bangladesh
