= Madeleine Daria Alizadeh =

Austrian author

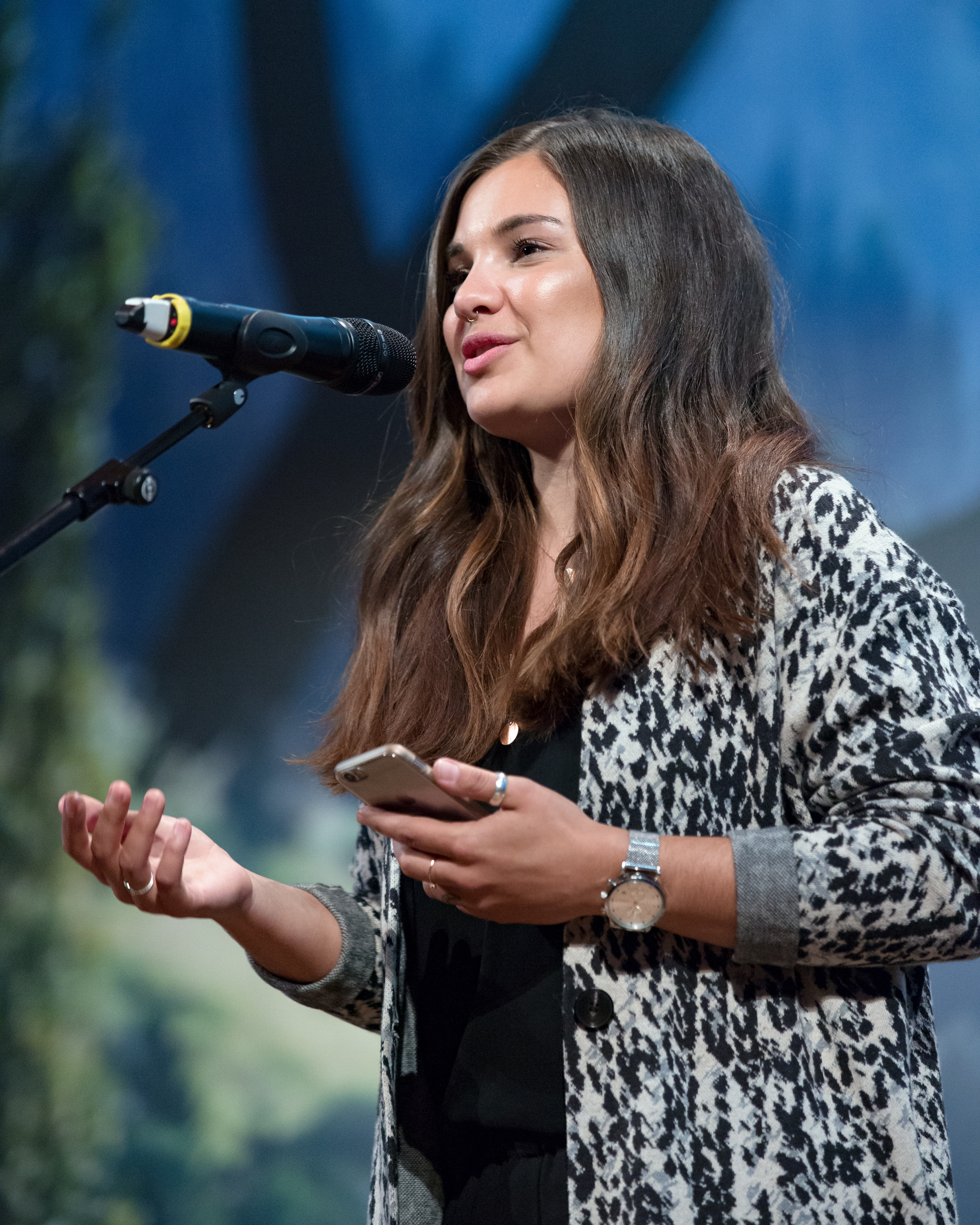
- DariaDaria at Konzerthaus Wien in May 2016
- Born: 10 July 1989 (age 36); Vienna

Madeleine Darya Alizadeh (born 10 July 1989 in Vienna, Austria, also known as dariadaria) is an Austrian author, podcaster, influencer, activist and entrepreneur. Her activities center around environmentalism, sustainability and mindfulness. She initially became known through her blog, which she ran for seven years, and, today, she runs the fashion label dariadéh and the podcast A Mindful Mess. Her book Starkes Weiches Herz ("Strong Soft Heart") was on the Spiegel bestseller list in fall 2019.

== Life & Education ==
Madeleine Alizadeh, born on 10 July 1989, in Vienna, Austria, is the daughter of an Iranian father and an Austrian mother. Her diverse background would later impact her engagement in political and social issues.

Alizadeh initially studied political sciences and ethnology but shifted to photography, completing a master's degree in Milan.

== Career ==
Alizadeh has built a multifaceted career that encompasses blogging, podcasting, fashion design, and activism. Her work predominantly focuses on sustainability, ethical practices, social justice, and conscious living.

=== Blogging ===
In 2010, Alizadeh launched the blog dariadaria, which quickly gained popularity in the German-speaking world. Initially focused on beauty and fashion, the Rana Plaza factory collapse in 2013 prompted her to shift her focus to ethical fashion and political discourse. The blog evolved into a profitable venture through various partnerships and endorsements, making Alizadeh a prominent voice in the sustainability movement.

=== Podcasting ===
In 2017, Alizadeh started the podcast A Mindful Mess, which covers a wide array of topics, including sustainability, mental health, feminism, and personal growth. The podcast has been a significant medium through which Alizadeh continues her advocacy and storytelling, allowing her to reach a broad audience and discuss important issues in a more intimate and personal format.

=== Fashion ===
In 2017, Alizadeh founded dariadéh, a fair-fashion label committed to producing sustainable, high-quality clothing. The brand emphasizes the use of non-toxic materials, inclusive sizing, and ethical production practices.

==== Writing ====
Alizadeh's book Starkes Weiches Herz (2019) achieved bestseller status on Spiegel's list in the paperback category. She coauthored the book Unlearn Patriarchy (2022) and continues to write a green lifestyle column for the local Wienerin magazine.

==== Activism ====
Alizadeh is an advocate for environmental protection, animal rights, veganism, and social justice. She promotes transparency, sustainability, and conscious consumption through her platforms. Her activism is deeply rooted in her personal experiences and educational background, driving her to address various social and environmental issues. Alizadeh's activist work primarily includes public speaking and demonstrating.

==== Political Involvement ====
In 2019, Alizadeh symbolically ran for the Austrian Green Party to support their environmental agenda.

== Wikipedia Controversy ==
Alizadeh has criticized Wikipedia for repeatedly deleting her page in the German-language edition, alleging sexism and unequal standards for women. Her page was deleted on January 25, 2023, with the justification of "no encyclopedic relevance." Alizadeh claimed that the deletion debate was led mainly by men and argued that women's biographies, especially those with foreign-sounding names, face stricter scrutiny compared to those of men.

== Awards & Nominations ==
- 2015: Otto Blog Award 2.0 in the category "User Voting"
- 2019: Woman of the Year Award in the category "Sinnfluencer"

== Publications ==
- Alizadeh, Madeleine (2019). Starkes weiches Herz: wie Mut und Liebe unsere Welt verändern können. Berlin: Ullstein leben. ISBN 978-3-96366-058-0.
- Unlearn patriarchy (7th ed.). Berlin: Ullstein. 2023. ISBN 978-3-550-20219-3. (contributor)
