= Mohamed Sohel Rana =

Mohamed Sohel Rana may refer to:

- Mohamed Sohel Rana (footballer, born 1991)
- Mohamed Sohel Rana (footballer, born 1996)
- Sohel Rana (footballer, born 1995)
- Sohel Rana (businessman), Bangladeshi businessman and politician
