= Bangladesh Judicial Service Commission =

Bangladeshi legal organisation

- Formation: 2007
- Headquarters: Dhaka, Bangladesh
- Region served: Bangladesh
- Official language: English & Bengali
- Chairman: Justice Farah Mahbub
- Main organ: Supreme Court Of Bangladesh
- Website: www.bjsc.gov.bd

Bangladesh Judicial Service Commission is an independent judicial commission that is responsible for the recruitment and examination of judges and judicial magistrates of the subordinate judiciary in Bangladesh and is located in Dhaka, Bangladesh. Justice Farah Mahbub is the present chairman of the commission. The commission is mostly known for maintaining fair recruitment -through it the most talented students are getting recruited in the Bangladesh judiciary. The judges recruited under it are playing a cutting-edge role in the justice delivery system of Bangladesh.

The raison d'être of the BJSC may be characterized as identifying individuals for judicial service based on their intellectual abilities, analytical skills and general proficiency in the laws.

== History ==
The commission was established in 2007. A judge of the Appellate Division is selected to the chairman of the commission. It is managed by a chairman and 10-member governing body.
