= 2012 Dhaka garment factory fire =

Fatal industrial accident

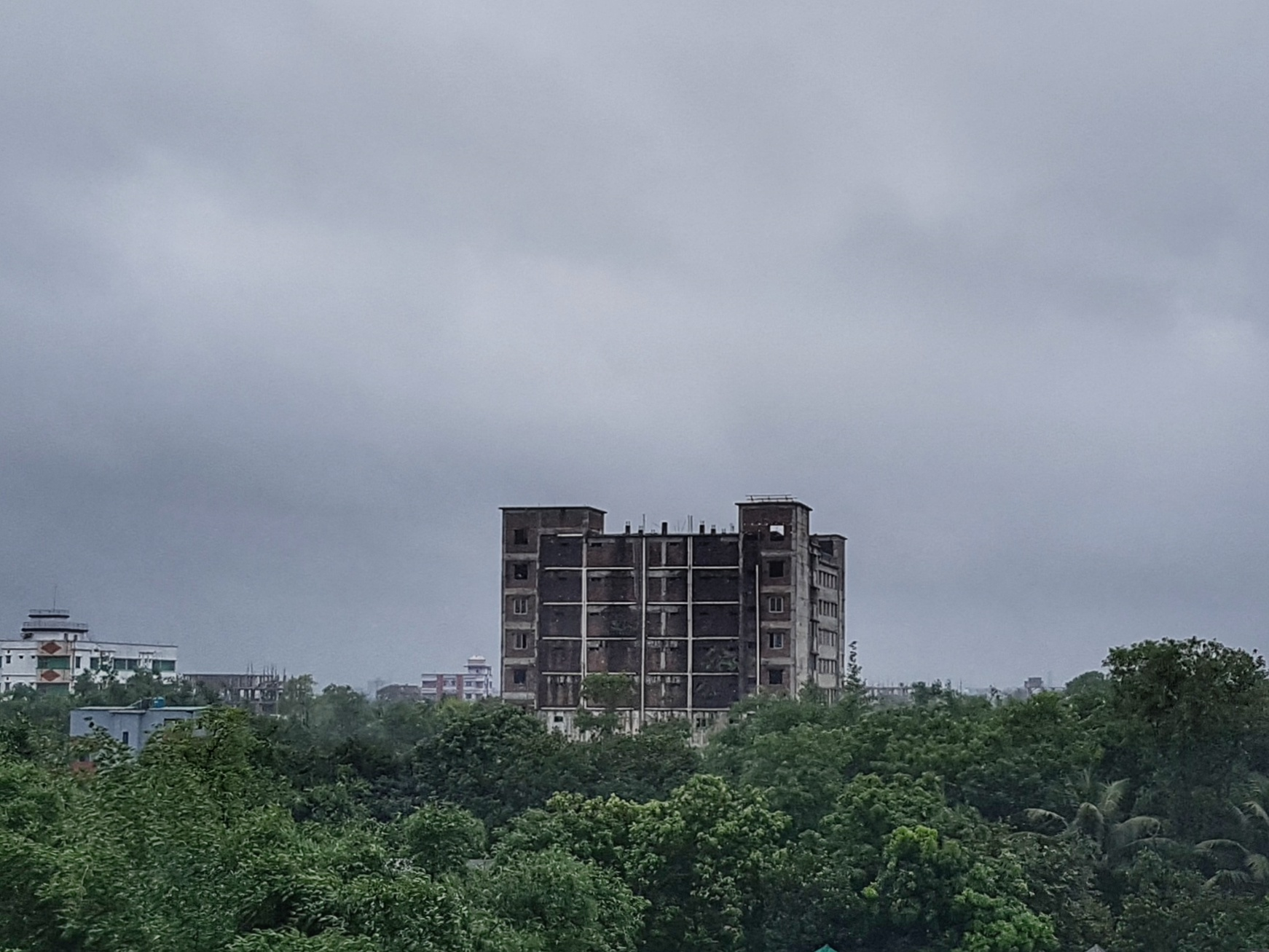
- Date: 24 November 2012
- Location: Dhaka, Bangladesh; 23.9295°N 90.3126°E
- Deaths: 117–124
- Injuries: 200+

The 2012 Dhaka garment factory fire broke out on 24 November 2012, in the Tazreen Fashion factory in the Ashulia district on the outskirts of Dhaka, Bangladesh. At least 117 people were confirmed dead in the fire, and over 200 were injured, making it the deadliest factory fire in the nation's history. The cause of the fire was not determined. It was initially presumed to be caused by an electrical short circuit, the cause of 80% of factory fires in Bangladesh. A widely criticized government report alleged an act of "sabotage", without identifying who committed it or why. This fire and others similar to it have led to numerous proposed reforms in workers' rights and safety laws in Bangladesh.

== Background ==
When it opened in 2009, the Tazreen Fashion factory employed 1,630 workers and produced T-shirts, polo shirts and jackets for various companies and organizations. These included the US Marines, Dutch company C&A, the American company Walmart and Hong Kong-based Li & Fung. The factory is part of the Tuba Group which is a major exporter of garments from Bangladesh to the U.S., Germany, France, Italy and the Netherlands. Its major clients include Walmart, Carrefour and IKEA.

According to Tazreen Fashions' web site, the factory was flagged in May 2011 with an "orange" grade by a Walmart ethical sourcing official for "violations and/or conditions which were deemed to be high risk". The notice said that any factory receiving three "orange" grade assessments in a two-year time period would not receive Walmart orders for one year. The orange rating was the first the company had received, and was followed by a "yellow" medium risk rating the next August, which pertained to the factory where the fire occurred. On 25 November, a Walmart spokesman said he was "so far unable to confirm that Tazreen is a supplier to Walmart nor if the document referenced in the article is in fact from Walmart"; the company subsequently terminated its relationship with Tazreen, stating that "The Tazreen factory [in Ashulia] was not authorized to produce merchandise for Walmart. A supplier subcontracted work to this factory without authorization and in direct violation of our policies." Documents found via email show that Walmart had subcontracted multiple clothing production orders through the Tazreen factory. According to The New York Times, Walmart played a significant role in blocking reforms to have retailers pay more for apparel in order to help Bangladesh factories improve their safety standards. Walmart director of ethical sourcing Sridevi Kalavakolanu asserted that the company would not agree to pay the higher cost, as such improvements in electrical and fire safety would be a "very extensive and costly modification" and that "it is not financially feasible for the brands to make such investments".

== Fire ==
The fire, presumably caused by exposed wires, started on the ground floor of the nine-story factory, trapping the workers on the floors above. Because of the large amount of fabric and yarn in the factory, the fire was able to quickly spread to other floors, complicating firefighting operations. The fire burned for more than seventeen hours before the firefighters extinguished it.

Some workers who had escaped to the roof of the building were rescued. The fire department's operations manager, Mohammad Mahbub, stated that the factory lacked the adequate emergency exits that would have made it possible to escape from the building, especially since the fire broke out in the warehouse on the ground floor and quickly moved up to higher floors. Of the building's three staircases, all three led through the ground floor, making them extremely dangerous and unusable in the case of a ground floor fire. That left many workers trapped and unable to get safely out of the course of the fire.

A crowd made up of thousands of relatives and onlookers gathered at the scene, causing Bangladesh Army soldiers to be deployed to maintain order.

== Victims ==
Most of the victims were found on the second floor, where at least 69 bodies were recovered. Witnesses reported that many workers had been unable to escape through the narrow exits of the building. Twelve of the victims died leaping from windows to escape the flames, some of whom would die of other injuries after they had been taken to area hospitals.

Many of the victims were unrecognizable because of the severity of the burns, which left families with no choice except to wait for DNA test results that could take up to six months.

== Investigation and legal ==
Investigators found that the fire safety certificate had expired in June 2012. Three supervisors from the factory were arrested on 28 November on charges of criminal negligence. Police accused them of padlocking exits and preventing workers from leaving the building. According to survivor Mohammad Ripu, who jumped off of the second floor, the factory manager told them "The fire alarm had just gone out of order. Go back to work."

In December 2013, 13 months after the fire, Bangladesh police filed a warrant for the arrest of Delwar Hossain, the owner and managing director of Tazreen Fashions Ltd. Fourteen months after the fire, Hossain was charged with the death by negligence of the victims, and he is awaiting trial in prison. This is the first time in Bangladesh that a factory owner has been formally charged in response to the deaths of workers. Saydia Gulrukh, an academic who has worked to bring Hossain to court, stated that "International pressure definitely influenced [the case]"; with the evolving attitudes towards workers' rights pushing the case into the global spotlight.

== Response ==
Prime Minister Sheikh Hasina stated her shock at the death toll and called for thorough search-and-rescue operations. She also stated her suspicion that the fire had been arson and an act of "sabotage." Home Minister Mohiuddin Khan Alamgir also alleged that arsonists were responsible, citing fires at other clothing factories, including one incident where employees were filmed on CCTV attempting to set fire to stockpiled cotton. However, the Home Minister later discounted the claim. The Bangladesh Garment Manufacturers and Exporters Association offered compensation of $1,250 to each of the dead victim's families, which is approximately two years' pay for the average factory worker.

Tazreen Factory owner Delwar Hossain stated that the premises had not been unsafe, adding, "It is a huge loss for my staff and my factory. This is the first time we have ever had a fire at one of my seven factories" In addition, the government declared 27 November 2012 a national day of mourning with the country flag flying at half-mast to honor the victims.

=== Fire and workplace safety ===
On 27 November, Walmart America ended its relationship with the Tuba company, which Walmart stated had been contracted by a supplier without its knowledge. The corporation also said that it would be working with suppliers to improve fire safety. Walmart also said it would donate US$1,600,000 to Institute for Sustainable Communities, which would use the donation to set up an Environmental, Health and Safety Academy in Bangladesh. Scott Nova, executive director of Worker Rights Consortium, said the donation is too little to make the industry safe, particularly because many factories do not even have basic safety features such as fire escapes. On 15 May 2013, companies whose clothing was manufactured at the Tazreen Design Ltd. factory met in Geneva to discuss compensation payments for the victims of the fire; Walmart and Sears declined to send representatives to the meeting for unknown reasons.

Thousands of Bangladeshi garment workers protested at the site of the fire, calling for better workplace safety. The protests continued for three days and blocked a major highway. Two hundred factories closed their doors during the protest to pay respect to the victims. The factory owners wanted to protect the equipment inside since the protests had become chaotic with stone throwing and smashing of vehicles.

The Bangladesh Garment Manufacturers and Exporters Association announced plans to expel 850 factories from its membership due to noncompliance with safety and labor standards. Members of the U.S. House of Representatives have also urged the U.S. Trade Representative's office to complete its review of Bangladesh's compliance with eligibility requirements for the Generalized System of Preferences.

== Revised regulations ==
In November 2013, three safety regulation groups, the Accord on Fire and Building Safety in Bangladesh, the Alliance for Bangladesh Worker Safety and the National Tripartite Plan of Action on Fire Safety and Structural Integrity in the garment Sector of Bangladesh (NTPA), agreed to look into adopting a new unified set of workplace safety standards for clothing manufacturing factories. The new standards would call for increased training of factory inspectors. The inspections would be carried out by two different inspectors with their experience in the field each being a minimum of five years and combining for a minimum total of 20 years. They would also regulate the spacing of exits making sure that there are ways to escape the building from multiple sides and the amount of machinery on each floor will have a cap allowing easy access to each exit.

As a move to increase factory and worker well-being, over 24 U.S. companies initiated by Wal-Mart and Gap Inc. have signed a pact. The pact holds them accountable to invest in factory inspections and upgrades and personally oversee the inspections of 600 of Bangladesh's clothing factories. Over 100 European brands have agreed to maintain their contracts with Bangladesh's factories and to pay a share of the upgrade and maintenance costs for a two-year period while overseeing the inspection of approximately 1,600 clothing factories. The National Government of Bangladesh pledged to inspect 1,200 more factories, which means that well over half of Bangladesh's 5,000 clothing factories will be inspected with these new regulations in the near future.

== Related occurrences ==
On 8 May 2013, a fire swept through another garment factory in Dhaka, killing at least seven people.

On 24 April 2013, Rana Plaza, an eight-story building in the suburb of Savar which housed multiple clothing manufacturing companies along with a bank and some apartments, collapsed killing over 1,100 workers and injuring 2,000 more. The building was evacuated days earlier due to a large crack spotted on one of the outer walls. After the accident, the owner of the building was arrested for not possessing adequate safety permits when constructing Rana Plaza, and the clothing factory managers were detained for making their employees come to work in an unsafe environment.

== See also ==
- 2005 Dhaka garment factory collapse
- 2012 Pakistan garment factory fires
- 2013 Savar building collapse
- 1911 Triangle Shirtwaist Factory fire
- 2010 Dhaka fire
- February 2019 Dhaka fire
- 2021 Narayanganj factory fire
- 2025 Dhaka garment factory fire
