= Farah Mahbub (judge) =

Bangladeshi jurist (born 1966)

- ফারাহ মাহবুব
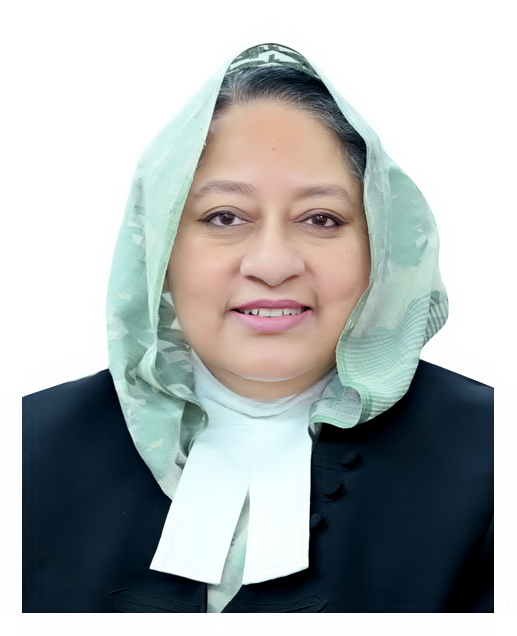
- Mahbub in 2013

Justice of the Appellate Division, Supreme Court
- Incumbent
- Assumed office 25 March 2025

Justice of the High Court Division of Bangladesh
- In office 23 August 2004 – 24 March 2025

Personal details
- Born: 27 May 1966 (age 60)
- Spouse: Shahriar Sayeed Hussain
- Children: Amatul Iffat Fareesah Hussain
- Parent(s): Mahbubur Rahman (father); Feroza Mahbub (mother)
- Education: University of Dhaka
- Profession: Judge

Farah Mahbub (born 27 May 1966) is a Bangladeshi judge of the Appellate Division, Supreme Court of Bangladesh.

== Early life and education ==
Farah Mahbub's father, Mahbubur Rahman, is a senior advocate in the Supreme Court and former minister of Bangladesh. Farah Mahbub passed SSC from Viqarunnisa Noon School and College in 1983 and HSC from Holy Cross College in 1985. She completed her undergraduate degree and post graduation in law from the University of Dhaka.

== Career ==
Farah Mahbub was enrolled as an advocate of the District Court on 15 September 1992. After her success in district court, she was enlisted in the High Court Division and the Appellate Division of the Bangladesh Supreme Court on 9 April 1994, and 15 May 2002, respectively. She was elevated as Additional Judge of the High Court Division on 23 August 2004, and appointed as a Judge of the same Division on 23 August 2006. She was elevated as a Judge of the Appellate Division on March 24, 2025. She will retire on 26 May 2033. On 21 January 2026, She was appointed as the chairman of Bangladesh Judicial Service Commission.

== Personal life ==
Mahbub married Shahriar Sayeed Hussain in 1992. They have one daughter named Fareesah. Her mother Feroza Mahbub died on 29 November 2015.

== See also ==
- Muhammad Habibur Rahman
- Latifur Rahman
- Khatun Sapnara
- Abu Sadat Mohammad Sayem
