= Shamsul Haider Siddique =

Bangladeshi army officer and prison inspector

- Military career
- Allegiance: Bangladesh
- Branch: Bangladesh Army; Bangladesh Rifles
- Service years: 1976 - 2009
- Rank: Colonel
- Unit: Army Service Corps
- Commands: CO of SSD, Rangpur; CO of 23rd Rifles Battalion; Sector Commander of Bangladesh Rifles; Deputy Inspector General of Bangladesh Jail
- Conflicts: Chittagong Hill Tracts Conflict; 2006–2008 Bangladeshi political crisis

Shamsul Haider Siddique is a former Bangladesh Army officer and former deputy inspector general of prisons of Bangladesh Jail. He was second in command of the prison system and served under Brigadier General Mohammad Zakir Hassan. He served during the 2006–2008 Bangladeshi political crisis began as a military backed caretaker government assumed power at the end of October 2006 following the end of term of the Bangladesh Nationalist Party administration during time numerous politicians, including former ministers and two former prime ministers, were jailed.

Siddique was responsible for the special cell where former prime ministers Sheikh Hasina and Khaleda Zia were detained. He oversaw the detention of more than a hundred political prisoners.

== Career ==
On 20 June 2007, Siddique reported AKM Mohiuddin Ahmed, convicted assassin of Sheikh Mujibur Rahman, is seeking to appeal the death penalty against him. In September, he escorted Arafat Rahman Koko, son of former Prime Minister Khaleda Zia, to Bangabandhu Sheikh Mujib Medical University, where he was subsequently admitted. In November, he put prisons on alert across Bangladesh after Jama'atul Mujahideen Bangladesh tried to carry out a jailbreak in Comilla. He was the jailer of the Special Prison (sub-jail) established in the Jatiya Sangsad, the national parliament, where former Prime Ministers Sheikh Hasina and Khaleda Zia were detained. Siddique went on a study tour of Iran sponsored by the United Nations Office on Drugs and Crime.

In December 2007, Siddique told The Daily Star that there were 600 prisoners sent to rigorous imprisonment who were given the duty to kill flies as they were too weak for more heavy-duty work. He also told the newspaper that former Minister of Home Affairs Mohammad Nasim and former State Minister of Civil Aviation and Tourism Mir Mohammad Nasiruddin were working as librarians. He mentioned other ministers Wadud Bhuiyan, Amanullah Aman, and Ruhul Kuddus Talukder Dulu were working as gardeners. He told ATN Bangla that former Minister of Law Moudud Ahmed spent his days writing in jail. He also spoke to the media about Altaf Hossain Chowdhury and Nazmul Huda.

Siddique helped the Bangladesh Army and the Election Commission register prisoners for the voters list. He reported that he only allowed the purchase of Islamic books now, but various genres of books were purchased in the past. He decided to purchase 6,500 Chinese .303 rifles and 10 thousand bullets from the Bangladesh Police and Bangladesh Army for jail guards. He chose to purchase 1000 rifles from the police and 5500 from the army. The Bangladesh Army also consented to provide 550,000 bullets for free to the jail guards. In June 2008, Sheikh Hasina was released from jail. He organized field trips for children kept in jail with their detained mothers. He reported the jails had no ambulances and there was a shortage of nurses and doctors. In September 2008, Siddique visited Tarique Rahman, son of former Prime Minister Khaleda Zia, at Bangabandhu Sheikh Mujib Medical University and ordered the removal of prison guards as he had received bail. In November, the government extended Siddique's job by one year,

In January 2009, Siddique kept Ranglai Mro, an indigenous peoples rights activist detained in 2007, in handcuffs while he was getting treated at the National Institute of Cardiovascular Diseases for injuries sustained during torture in custody, which drew flak from the media. Some guards clashed with students of the Bokshibazar Alia Madarssa over playing in a field owned by the jail in January 2009. The Awami League comes to power in 2009, and Sheikh Hasina becames prime minister, replacing the caretaker government. According to an investigation by a team of the Jail Directorate led by Commander M Zakaria Khan, Siddique was found guilty of violating 15 codes of the jail in February 2009. He was found favoring convict Monowar Hossain Dipjol in prison and giving him special privileges, such as allowing 200 visitors for Dipjol in 52 days. In February, Inspector General of Prisons Brigadier General Zakir Hassan was replaced with Brigadier General AHM Moqbul Hossain. Siddique was transferred from Dhaka Division to Barisal-Khulna division and was replaced by Major Sheikh Saiful Alam from Chittagong Division.

In 2022, Siddique was the general manager of BM Container Depot, owned by Smart Group, in Sitakunda, Chittagong. The depot caught fire in the 2022 Sitakunda fire, which originated from the storage of the depot.
