= RMG Sustainability Council =

- Formation: 2020
- Headquarters: Dhaka, Bangladesh
- Region served: Bangladesh
- Official language: Bengali
- Website: rsc-bd.org/en

RMG Sustainability Council (Bengali: আরএমজি সাস্টেইনেবিলিটি কাউন্সিল) is a semi-official body responsible for ensuring a safe working environment in ready-made garment factories in Bangladesh. It is responsible for inspecting factories in Bangladesh. Shafiul Islam Mohiuddin and Amirul Haque Amin are co-chairman of the organisation. Rubana Huq is an executive committee member of the council.

== History ==
Bangladesh Garment Manufacturers and Exporters Association and Accord on Fire and Building Safety in Bangladesh met on 14 January 2020. They decided to establish an organisation, RMG Sustainability Council, to take over the accord's responsibilities in Bangladesh. RMG Sustainability Council was established on 1 June 2020. The International Labour Organisation provided support to the creation of the council.

The accord was established after the Rana Plaza collapse killed more than one thousand garment workers. Following a legal battle, the accord was forced to leave Bangladesh leaving responsibility of monitoring factories to the RMG Sustainability Council. The council has 200 employees. International garment unions withdrew from the Council in 2021 to increase pressure for the creation of a new accord. BGMEA has provided support to the council and the Department of Inspection for Factories and Establishments to carry out inspection of garment factories.

RMG Sustainability Council issues certification stating inspected factories are complying with safety requirements under the accord.
