= Alliance for Bangladesh Worker Safety =

The Alliance for Bangladesh Worker Safety
- Founded: July 2013; 12 years ago
- Location: Dhaka, Bangladesh
- Website: bangladeshworkersafety.org

The Alliance for Bangladesh Worker Safety, also known as "the Alliance" or AFBWS, is a group of 28 major global retailers formed to develop and launch the Bangladesh Worker Safety Initiative, a binding, five-year undertaking with the intent of improving safety in Bangladeshi ready-made garment (RMG) factories after the 2013 Rana Plaza building collapse. Collectively, Alliance members represent the majority of North American imports of ready-made garments from Bangladesh, produced in more than 700 factories.

== Background ==
After the 2013 Savar building collapse, Walmart became a founding member of the Alliance for Bangladesh Worker Safety. Monsoon was a member of the Ethical Trading Initiative (ETI) from before the 2013 Savar building collapse due to structural integrity and failure.

The building had housed a number of separate garment factories employing around 5,000 people, several shops, and a bank. The factories manufactured apparel for brands including Benetton, Monsoon Accessorize, Bonmarché, the Children's Place, El Corte Inglés, Joe Fresh, Mango, Matalan, Primark, and Walmart.

== Formation of the Alliance ==
The Alliance was organized through the U.S. Bipartisan Policy Center (BPC) with discussions convened and chaired by former U.S. Senate Majority Leader George J. Mitchell (D-ME) and former U.S. Senator Olympia Snowe (R-ME). The collaborative formation process involved apparel industry companies and stakeholders, including the U.S. and Bangladeshi governments, policymakers, international NGOs, and members of civil society and organized labor in Bangladesh. On July 10, 2013, the group announced the Bangladesh Worker Safety Initiative. The Initiative is a binding, five-year plan focused on fire and building safety inspections, worker training, and worker empowerment.

The Alliance for Bangladesh Worker Safety has elected former US Representative Ellen Tauscher as independent chairperson.

The company responsible for managing the Alliance is ELEVATE under CEO Ian Spaulding. http://www.elevatelimited.com

== Key Alliance documents ==
- Alliance Action Plan
- Alliance Timeline
- Member Agreement for companies
- Alliance Bylaws
- Alliance Statistics - Provides key statistics regarding the status of factory inspections, remediation, training and other worker empowerment initiatives.

== Alliance work in Bangladesh ==
=== Factory inspections and public reporting ===
The Alliance helped develop a common Fire Safety and Structural Integrity Standard – founded on the requirements of the 2006 Bangladesh National Building Code (BNBC), though the Standard exceeds those requirements in some cases. The Standard was developed and is being implemented to ensure that all Member factories are held to the same safety requirements. The Standard was developed by technical experts from both the Alliance and the Accord on Fire and Building Safety in Bangladesh, and finalized in December 2013. The Standard has been harmonized with the guidelines developed by the Bangladesh University of Engineering and Technology (BUET) for the National Tripartite Plan of Action (NTPA).

The Alliance has retained a committee of independent fire and structural safety experts from Bangladesh, Europe and North America who are credentialed authorities in fire or building structural safety. The Committee of Experts (COE) is responsible for overseeing the implementation of the Alliance Standard, which includes approving qualified inspectors, conducting spot audits of remediation efforts and validating inspection reports. The Alliance has publicly announced that it aims to inspect all factories producing for its members by July 10, 2014.

The Alliance is working with the Fair Factories Clearinghouse, a non-profit organization that provides software to facilitate information-sharing. Alliance Members use this public platform to provide and exchange information about factories they use, fire and building safety training programs and curricula, and submit monthly reports on safety inspections and progress update on remediation plans being undertaken.

The Standard is used to evaluate all Alliance factories. The Board of Directors issues semi-annual public reports detailing its work and progress toward meeting in-country fire and building safety objectives, as well as training and worker empowerment goals.

In early September, 2015 the Alliance has recognized six RMG factories of Bangladesh to international standard as they finished all reformation works. These factories are; Green Textile, Kwun Tong Apparel, Laundry Industries, Lenny Apparel, Optimum Fashions, and Univogue.

=== Worker participation ===
In November and December 2013, the Alliance conducted a Worker Baseline Survey among more than 3,200 workers in 28 garment factories in Bangladesh. 10 focus groups were conducted off-site with 101 participants in three Bangladeshi regions to obtain more information on fire and other health and safety issues.

The purpose of the survey and the off-site interviews was to better understand the current level of awareness of health and safety risks and what workers believe needs to be done to improve safety and reduce risk in the factories. It is also a tool that will inform the necessary detail of our training programs.

The Alliance's worker helpline and education program will be implemented by three worker empowerment-focused, organizations, working in partnership. Clear Voice, the organization that provides tools for communication with workers, was founded by an early worker rights and human rights pioneer, Doug Cahn. Clear Voice will partner with Phulki, one of Bangladesh's leading worker rights non-governmental organizations (NGO), and Good World Solutions, whose focus will be on applying its Labor Link technology to train workers on their rights and survey them on their wellbeing.

Beginning March 2014, the helpline program will be piloted in 50 factories Dhaka and Chittagong, with in-factory orientations to accompany the launch at each location. Helplines will roll out to 100 factories by March 2015, with the goal of becoming functional in all Alliance factories by 2017.

== Local operations ==
On December 9, 2013, the Alliance opened an office in Dhaka, Bangladesh, where the Alliance is focused on inspection implementation, development of a worker training curriculum, establishing a worker empowerment helpline, and building local capacity for completing factory improvements. As of February 2014, the Dhaka office serves as the primary hub for staff and organizational activities. All staff members in the Dhaka office are Bangladeshi nationals who bring decades of combined experience in Bangladesh's garment industry. As of March 2014, the team includes a managing director, managers for fire and structural safety, assessments, training, worker outreach and empowerment, factory liaison and remediation, as well as other support staff.

== Alliance governance ==
The board of directors is entrusted with oversight responsibility for Alliance Members' compliance with Initiative requirements, such as meeting financial obligations and self-imposed deadlines for achieving inspections, information-sharing and worker training agreements.

The Board has the authority to investigate possible non-compliance, and take appropriate action against delinquent companies, by a two-thirds majority vote, including termination of membership in the Alliance.

== Board of directors ==
- Ellen O'Kane Tauscher - Chairperson
- Ambassador James Moriarty, Former U.S. Ambassador to Bangladesh
- Wilma Wallace, Vice President Global Responsibility, Business & Human Rights, Gap Inc.
- Irene Quarshie, Vice President of Product Safety Quality Assurance & Social Compliance, Target Corporation
- Jan Saumweber, Vice President of Responsible Sourcing, Wal-Mart Stores, Inc.
- Randy Tucker, Principle, Tucker Consulting Associates
- Tom Nelson, Vice President for Global Product Procurement, VF Corporation
- Tapan Chowdhury, Founder, Square Textiles Limited
- Simone Sultana, chair, BRAC UK
