= Sohel Rana (businessman) =

Bangladeshi businessman

- Born: c. 1977 (age 48–49)
- Known for: Rana Plaza collapse
- Political party: Bangladesh Awami League
- Criminal charge: Corruption
- Criminal penalty: Three years in jail

Mohammad Sohel Rana (born 1977) is a Bangladeshi businessman, politician, and convicted criminal who was the owner of Rana Plaza, which collapsed in Savar, a sub-district near Dhaka, the capital of Bangladesh. He is a leader of the Jubo League, youth wing of the Bangladesh Awami League party.

== Rana Plaza collapse ==
Rana and his father Abdul Khalek built Rana Plaza in 2006, after they reportedly had bullied off co-owners and falsified deeds to acquire full possession. He obtained permits from political allies to expand the building to five floors. On 23 April 2013, explosion-like sounds led people to bring in an engineer to inspect the building. After observing large cracks in supporting columns, the engineer fled the building and urged everyone to evacuate. Rana, who fielded local journalists on the bottom floor, told these reporters that the plaster on the wall was broken. The next day, Rana and the factory owners urged workers to return to their jobs. When a generator on an upper floor switched on and shook the building, the building collapsed, killing 1,134 people and wounding an estimated 2,500 others. Rana's building was not built to facilitate factories. It was built to house shops and other small stores. Rana Plaza was not strong enough to handle the vibrations and power from the heavy machinery used by factories.

== Arrest and trial ==
Rapid Action Battalion members arrested Sohel Rana from Benapole in Jessore District on 28 April 2013, four days after the Savar tragedy.

In March 2014, Rana was granted six months' bail by the High Court. This prompted angry reactions from labour leaders. However, Rana was not released from jail as other charges filed by police were pending.

On 29 August 2017, Rana was sentenced to a maximum of three year imprisonment by a court for failing to declare his wealth to Bangladesh's anti-graft commission. The trials for murder and other charges were delayed due to appeals to the Supreme Court of Bangladesh. The murder trial resumed in February 2022. Rana, his parents Abdul Khaleque and Morjina Begum, and 34 others were charged with causing the deaths of the workers, along with four others charged for sheltering Rana. As of April 2026, the murder trial was ongoing, with 145 witness testimonies completed out of 594 planned witnesses.
