= Ethical Trading Initiative =

The Ethical Trading Initiative (ETI) is a UK-based independent body founded on 9 June 1998, which brings together companies, trade unions and non-governmental organisations (NGOs) to ensure compliance with international labour standards in the global supply chains of member companies. Minimum ethical standards are set out in the ETI Base Code.

== Origin ==
The mid 1990s saw increased awareness of sweatshop working conditions for overseas garment and factory workers. This triggered calls for radical change regarding the ethics of employment overseas factories. As a reaction, companies created their own codes of conduct and set moral expectations for their supply chains. These set maximum working hours, minimum pay and codified the employees' freedom of association. Investigation had found that former companies’ codes of conduct were, in effect, futile as they inadvertently controlled the workforce further. Additionally, enforcement of these codes was through in-house or company-paid monitoring programmes. These were often described as "piecemeal" and "lacking credibility".

The subsequent formation of the ETI was backed therefore by NGOs, UK businesses, and the then UK Secretary of State for International Development, Clare Short. Acting independently from the companies, it could more credibly implement the code and provide protection for workers.

== Current operations ==
As of 2025, ETI membership includes 90 companies, employing 10 million workers globally within their supply chains. High-profile members include the BBC, Co-op, Fat Face and ASOS. The ETI relies on annual subscriptions from its member organisations. These formerly comprised a few, albeit large, companies (such as ASDA and The Body Shop). Companies may apply for membership regardless of their size or type of business.

The ETI is registered with Companies House as a company limited by guarantee, number 03578127. The current Executive Director of ETI is Giles Bolton. Bolton took over the role from Peter McAllister in 2024.

== Base code ==
The ETI requires members to adopt and enforce the base code. This is expected to form the base for workers' conditions and rights.

The code includes the following principles:

- "Employment is freely chosen", meaning workers are not forced to work there or for longer than is contracted. They are also not forced to remain in the employment if they indicate they do not want to.
- Freedom of association and collective bargaining. This allows workers to become members of trade unions or other forms of workers organisations. To the ETI, this condition is an essential requirement for membership and it has sanctioned companies for non-compliance.
- "Working conditions are safe and hygienic."
- "Child labour shall not be used." This point has been criticised as having unintended consequences, discussed below.
- "Living wages are paid." This differs from the minimum wage and is often much more.
- "Working hours are not excessive." This element relies on the states’ laws on maximum working hours. It has been argued in the theory of 'Race to the Bottom', that states compete with one another to raise maximum working hours (or lower safety regulations) so as to attract business, at the expense of workers’ health. Thus, exceeding the legal working limit is difficult in most cases.
- "No discrimination is practised."
- "Regular employment is practised." This would outlaw precarious and unreliable zero-hour contracts where the work attendance is at the discretion of the employer.
- "No harsh or inhumane treatment is allowed." This includes physical, sexual and verbal abuse as well as subhuman working conditions and practises.

The ETI admit that some of these points have better compliance than others, and work towards them is still required. This lies in the more subjective points. For example, working hours and no child labour are measurable and quantifiable aims, whereas freedom of association does not factor in the unmonitorable atmosphere and culture that may prevent someone from feeling free to join any such association. There is also difficulty in implementing the living wages point, due to factors outside of companies such as rising costs of housing, fuel and schooling that decrease the workers’ wages. There is also an economic theory that points out that by increasing the paid wage, in accordance to the perceived living wage can eventually decrease the ‘take home’ wage. This is because the pay increase means that the costs of goods will have to increase to cover the higher labour costs. Therefore the consumers (who include the ones making the goods) will have to pay more from their new ‘living wage’, decreasing how much they have left to live with.

== Governmental influence ==
The UK Department for International Development has granted unrestricted funding. They often work with other governments to ensure adequate funding and also to lobby for legislative changes, if found to be necessary.

== Departures ==
Boohoo, one of the largest UK fast fashion brands, withdrew their interest in becoming a member in 2019. Boohoo refused to meet and answer USDAW’s (Union of Shop, Distributive and Allied Workers trade union) questions. This came after the UK Environmental Audit Committee’s inquiry into the fashion industry, recommended that the retailer engaged with USDAW in a bid to repair their damaged reputation. The committee also suggested becoming a member of the ETI which would bind the retailer into ethical practices, including paying a living wage and protecting workers' freedom of association. This follows revelation that workers in their Burnley warehouse were being paid £3.50 per hour, a fraction of the legal £8.21. The key recommendation from the committee was to recognise the workers' right to join a trade union. The ETI statement on the subject wrote, “a key expectation ETI has of its members an open attitude towards the activities of trade unions, enabling effective representation and ideally for workers to bargain collectively.” The ETI made a submission to the Environmental Audit Committee, meaning they actively disagree with the evidence given by Boohoo. Since then, there has been no further advancement in the retailer’s membership process to the ETI.

Fyffes, an Ireland-based banana supplier, was suspended and eventually expelled, due to repeated failure to enforce the base code. In March 2016, NGOs Banana Link and the International Union of Food workers (IUF) complained to the initiative about the supplier not respecting their workers’ right to freedom of association; disallowing and not recognising the trade unions some workers chose to associate with. In some cases farmers were sacked who had chosen to associate with trade unions. In light of these concerns, a suspension order was put in place in May 2017. During this period Fyffes were encouraged by the ETI to reform their practices in line with the code; specifically to allow their farmers in Honduras to join trade unions at their discretion. Despite warnings, the highlighted concerns were not redressed, leading to membership being revoked in March 2019. Fyffes, in a statement to The Grocer, said that although "disappointed", they ultimately did not agree with the decision made by the ETI on the grounds that the trade union in question, Sindicato de Trabajadores de la Agroindustria y Similares (STAS), is not legally recognised in Honduras. Hence, denial of association remained, from their perspective, ethical. They decided not to appeal the order. Fyffes also said that they would continue implementing the base code in their practices across the supply chain.

Banana link, a not-for-profit co-operative aiming to protect and restore plantation workers’ rights, also told The Grocer that they will press Fyffes on their agreement put in place in January 2019. The agreement states that they would reinstate sacked union members, while also raising wages and conditions for their workers, thus supported by STAS.

== Criticism ==
One element of the base code is particularly contentious: the prohibition of child labour. A group of academics in 2016 condemned a United Nations convention banning child labour as promoting a particularly Western view of childhood as innocent and labour-free. They argue that paid work may be the means by which a child will feed their family or fund their siblings' or their own schooling. They argue that banning child labour, without effective actions against the large-scale poverty that necessitates it, can be futile or counterproductive.

When the Indian government took nationwide measures to prevent child labour, they inadvertently caused more. As legal employment was no longer an option, families needing money for food and education turned to informal child employment. These operations are illegal and unregulated, so the employers can pay much less and often have harsher conditions, pushing other children into work to supplement the lost wages.
