= Accord on Fire and Building Safety in Bangladesh =

Occupational safety agreement in Bangladesh

Stichting Bangladesh Accord Foundation
- Type: Foundation
- Founded: 15 May 2013
- Headquarters: Amsterdam, Netherlands
- Area served: Bangladesh
- Key people: Rob Wayss (Executive Director & Acting Chief Safety Inspector)
- Services: Inspection
- Website: bangladeshaccord.org

The Accord on Fire and Building Safety in Bangladesh (the Accord) was signed on 15 May 2013. It is a five-year independent, legally binding agreement between global brands, retailers, and trade unions designed to build a safe and healthy Bangladeshi Ready Made Garment (RMG) Industry. The agreement was created in the immediate aftermath of the Rana Plaza building collapse in Bangladesh that resulted in the death of 1129 people and injured more than 2000. In June 2013, an implementation plan was agreed leading to the incorporation of the Bangladesh Accord Foundation in the Netherlands in October 2013.

The agreement consists of six key components:

1. A five-year legally binding agreement between brands and trade unions to ensure a safe working environment in the Bangladeshi RMG industry
2. An independent inspection program supported by brands in which workers and trade unions are involved
3. Public disclosure of all factories, inspection reports and corrective action plans (CAP)
4. A commitment by signatory brands to ensure sufficient funds are available for remediation and to maintain sourcing relationships
5. Democratically elected health and safety committees in all factories to identify and act on health and safety risks
6. Worker empowerment through an extensive training program, complaints mechanism and right to refuse unsafe work.

The agreement is an example of project-oriented multistakeholder governance.

== Terms ==
In addition to schemes of building inspection and enforcement of fire and safety standards, the accord requires that contracts by international retailers with Bangladesh manufacturers provide for compensation adequate to maintain safe buildings. Retailers agree to continue to support the Bangladesh textile industry despite possible higher costs. It is estimated that the total cost may be $1 billion, about $500,000 per factory. Close co-operation with the International Labour Organization and the government of Bangladesh is required. A steering committee which governs the accord is established as are dispute resolution procedures such as arbitration. The accord calls for development of an Implementation Plan over 45 days.

== History ==
=== Creation ===
Prior to the creation of the Accord in 2013, the Bangladesh garment industry had a number of fires and building collapses within the district. In February 2010, a fire in the Garib & Garib Sweater Factory took the lives of 21, while another fire killed 29 more at the "That's It Sportswear" factory in December of the same year. With deaths and buildings collapsing, NGOs in Bangladesh began attempting to work with the major companies involved to approach health and safety concerns within factories. One result of these meetings was the first draft of the Memorandum of Understanding (MoU), intended to prevent these tragedies. Companies such as Gap, PVH Corp., and Tchibo were encouraged to sign the MoU, with Gap becoming unwilling and continuing to employ the same methods of self-checking that had been used prior to the draft of the MoU. Both PVH Corp. and Tchibo signed MoUs with labor rights organizations in 2012 with terms similar to the Bangladesh Accord.

Later that same month, a fire at the Tazreen garment factory took the lives of 112 people, with the factory owners facing homicide charges. Following this devastating event, a new proposal was drawn up calling for: "Better regulation and stronger enforcement, Investment in safer facilities and infrastructure, Closure of unsafe premises, Engagement of workers and their representatives in promoting safe working practices with management and reporting of issues to competent authorities, Effective training and emergency preparedness of all staff, Assessment of buyers' responsibilities and necessary improvement of practices."

The German government sponsored a meeting of retailers and NGOs at the beginning of May, and the meeting set a deadline of midnight of 16 May 2013 to sign up to the agreement. Working with the Clean Clothes Campaign, Worker Rights Consortium, International Labor Rights Forum, and the Maquila Solidarity Network, the GIZ agency and IndustriALL (a global union federation) began forming a program that needed to meet the needs of trade union and NGO representatives. The main objectives of this program were a foundation for the Accord on Fire and Building Safety in Bangladesh, specifically focusing on fire safety following the Rana Plaza factory collapse. Based on the previously submitted proposals for safety, the Accord was issued on 5 May 2013, and an official announcement of intention to sign was given by H&M on 13 May 2013. H&M signing of the Accord was a key step in encouraging other companies to declare their intent to sign as well. Numerous companies had signed up by the deadline, covering over 1,000 Bangladeshi garment factories.

Since 29 October 2013, the Accord has been signed by over 200 apparel brands, retailers and importers from over 20 countries in Europe, North America, Asia and Australia; two global trade unions; and eight Bangladesh trade unions and four NGO witnesses. Some of the notable companies are listed below. For a complete list see the Bangladesh Accord website.

Signatories of the Bangladesh Accord
- Abercrombie & Fitch
- Adidas
- Åhléns
- Aldi North
- Aldi South
- American Eagle Outfitters
- Antigua Apparel
- Arcadia Group
- Artsana
- Auchan
- Benetton
- Bestseller
- Bonmarche
- C&A
- Camaieu
- Carrefour
- Coop Danmark A/S
- Cotton On
- Dansk Supermarked
- De Bijenkorf
- Debenhams
- E.Leclerc
- Edinburgh Woollen Mill
- El Corte Inglés
- Ellos Group
- Esprit
- Fast Retailing
- Fat Face
- Fruit of the Loom
- G-Star
- Groupe Casino
- Gruppo Coin/OVS
- H&M
- Helly Hansen
- HEMA
- Hugo Boss
- Hunkemöller
- IC Companys
- Inditex (parent of Zara)
- John Lewis
- KappAhl
- Karstadt
- KiK
- Kmart Australia
- LC Waikiki
- Lidl
- Loblaw
- LPP
- Mango
- Marks and Spencer
- Matalan
- Mavi
- Metro Group
- Monoprix
- Morrisons
- Mothercare
- N Brown Group
- New Look
- Next
- Otto GmbH
- Pacific Brands
- Primark
- Puma SE
- PVH (parent of Calvin Klein, Tommy Hilfiger and Izod)
- Rewe Group
- River Island
- s.Oliver
- Sainsbury's
- Schmidt Group
- Sean John
- Shop Direct Group
- Stadium
- Stockmann
- Suprema
- Tally Weijl
- Target Australia
- Tchibo
- Tesco
- Voice Norge AS
- Zeeman

=== Rival American plan ===
Most North American retailers did not sign the accord. Companies like Gap Inc. and Walmart cited liability concerns. According to spokespersons for the retail industry, American courts, which allow class actions, contingent fees, and do not require losing plaintiffs to pay legal fees, might permit liability claims against retailers in the event of another disaster which might result in substantial enforceable judgments, in contrast to European courts which generally do not allow class actions, forbid contingent fees, and require losing plaintiffs to pay winning defendants' legal fees and costs. However, as John C. Coffee, professor of corporate law at Columbia Law School, pointed out, Kiobel v. Royal Dutch Petroleum Co. might apply thus foreclosing suits by Bangladesh workers under the Alien Tort Claims Act, but this seems unlikely. It is more likely that liability would be based on contract law.

On 10 July 2013, a group of 17 major North American retailers calling themselves the Alliance for Bangladesh Worker Safety announced the Bangladesh Worker Safety Initiative. The Initiative drew criticism from labour groups who complained that it was less stringent than the Accord and lacked legally binding commitments to pay for improvements.

=== Developments since 2013 ===
There were a significant number of accomplishments under the 2013 Accord, those of which included large scale hazard identification and remediation of these safety issues. Engineers inspected more than 2000 RMG factories where they identified more than 150,000 safety hazards. Additionally, companies committed to negotiating terms with their suppliers such that it was possible for the factories to maintain and uphold a safe workplace environment along with maintaining the safety remediation requirements. There was also a Safety Training Program initiative where 1.4 million workers in Accord-covered factories were educated and informed about proper workplace safety and evacuation drills, along with the rights that they had under the Accord. Anything that was not effectively handled at the factory level, such as individual worker complaints, were processed through Safety and Health Complaints Mechanism, which allowed them to remedy these concerns. By the end of the 2013 Accord, 200 worker complaints had been effectively handed through this program.

As of September 2019, there has been a 90% initial remediation progress rate at Accord-covered factories. 254 factories have completed the initial remediation and there has been over 90% initial remediation at 1,120 factories.

=== 2018 Transition Key Accord ===
The 2018 Transition Key Accord was signed on 1 July 2018, in order to fulfill the same purposes as the 2013 Accord as well as maintaining the progress previously made. It is also a legally binding agreement between brands and trade unions and some of the key features include brand commitment to ensure safety remediation is completed and financially feasible, independent safety inspections and remediation program. There will also be disclosure of inspection reports and corrective action plans. Other key features of the accord include: a Safety Committee and Training Program, Safety and Health Complaints Mechanism, protection of right to refuse unsafe work, along with the transition of the Accord functions to a larger national safety monitoring body.

The Accord is governed by a Steering Committee that consists of representatives from the signatory companies and trade unions along with a neutral chair from the International Labor Organization (ILO).

Signatories of the Transition Key Accord
- Bangladesh Textile and Garments Workers League
- Clean Clothes Campaign
- El Corte Ingles
- H&M
- Inditex
- ILO
- IndustriALL Global Union
- National Garment Workers Federation
- LC Waikiki
- Loblaw Companies
- Otto Group
- UNI Global Union
- Workers Rights Consortium

One of the key features of the 2018 Accord is that it has pledged to hand over its functions to the Bangladesh government's Remediation and Coordination Cell (RCC), a unit of the Department of Inspection for Factories and Establishments. The 2018 Accord pledges support for the RCC until it fully takes over the Accord functions.

The transition started gradually, with the RCC taking on some of the inspection and remediation duties at factories.
