= FR Tower fire =

2019 building fire in Dhaka, Bangladesh

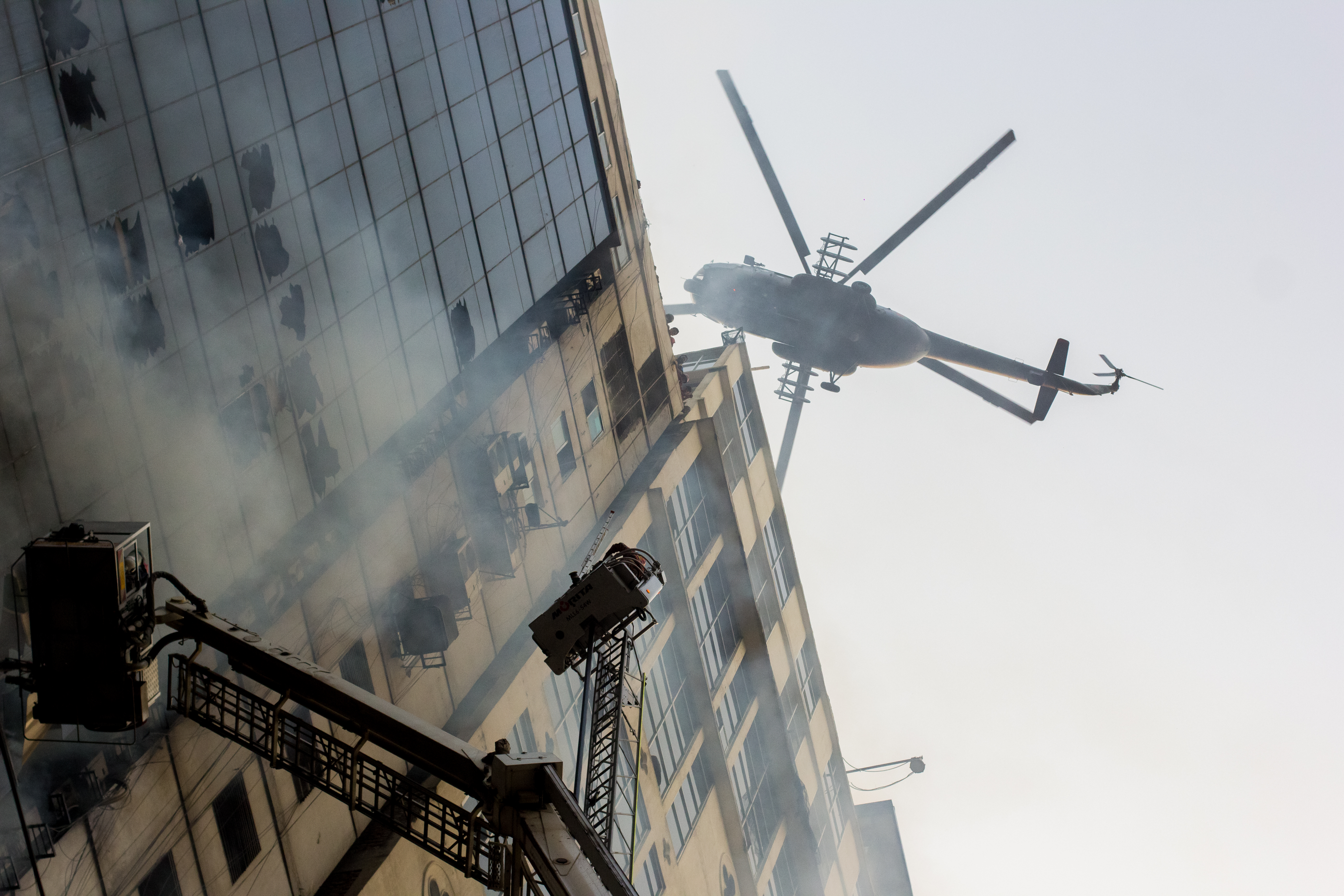
- Location of FR Tower
- Date: 28 March 2019
- Time: 1:00 pm BST
- Location: FR Tower, Banani, Dhaka, Bangladesh; 23.7938°N 90.4049°E
- Type: Structure fire
- Deaths: 25
- Injuries: 73

On 28 March 2019, the FR Tower Fire broke out on the eighth floor of the 22-storey FR Tower in the commercial Banani area of Dhaka, Bangladesh around 1:00 pm BST. The fire claimed 25 lives and more than 70 people were injured. Duronto TV and Radio Today shut down their transmissions when the fire broke out because both of their offices were situated adjacent to the FR tower.

== Casualties ==
As of 28 March, the death toll was estimated to be at least 26. Among the dead was a Sri Lankan citizen who fell to his death while escaping the fire. In addition, at least 70 people were injured and transported to hospitals with severe burns and lung damage.

== See also ==
- February 2019 Dhaka fire
