= Rana Plaza collapse =

2013 industrial building collapse in Savar, Bangladesh

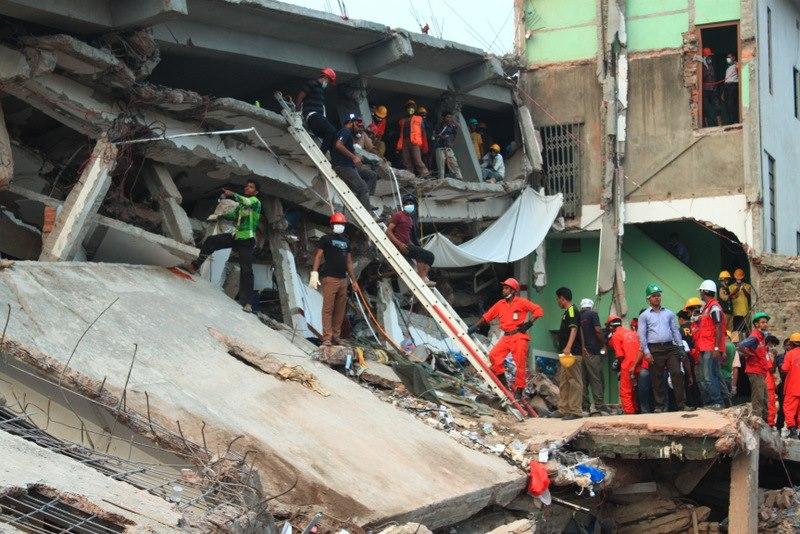
- Side view of the collapsed building
- Date: April 24, 2013; 13 years ago
- Time: 08:45 am BST (UTC+06:00)
- Location: Savar Upazila, Dhaka District, Bangladesh; 23°50′46″N 90°15′27″E
- Also known as: Savar building collapse
- Deaths: 1,134
- Injuries: ~2,500
- Suspects: Sohel Rana
- Charges: Murder

Rana Plaza's collapse (also referred to as the Savar building collapse) occurred on 24 April 2013 in Savar Upazila, near Dhaka, Bangladesh, when the nine-story Rana Plaza commercial building collapsed due to a structural failure. The search for survivors lasted for 19 days and ended on 13 May 2013, with confirmed death toll of 1,134. Approximately 2,500 injured people were rescued from the building. It is considered to be one of the deadliest structural failures in modern human history, as well as the deadliest garment-factory disaster in history, and is the deadliest industrial accident in the history of Bangladesh. Amnesty International called it "the most shocking recent example of business-related human rights abuse."

The building housed five garment factories, a bank, and apartments. It was constructed in 2006 on the site of a former pond, and was built without proper permits. The fifth through eighth floors were added onto the building without supporting walls; the heavy equipment from the garment factories was more than the structure could support. On 23 April 2013, large cracks were discovered in the building. The shops and the bank on the lower floors immediately closed, but the garment factory owners on the upper floors ignored the warnings and the workers returned to work the following day. On 24 April, the building collapsed at 9:00 am local time, trapping thousands of people inside.

The court in Bangladesh formally charged 38 people with murder, along with the building owner Sohel Rana. Rana was arrested after a four-day manhunt, as he attempted to flee across the border to India. A total of 41 defendants faced charges over the collapse of the complex. Of the 41 people charged, 35 (including Rana) appeared before the court and plead not guilty. Rana was not granted bail. He was charged with corruption again in 2017 and jailed three years for failing to submit his wealth statements; the trials continue to this day.

The collapse of Rana Plaza was a major turning point for the global fashion industry. It led to widespread protests and international outrage over unsafe working conditions in developing nations. In the aftermath, the Bangladesh government passed new laws requiring all garment factories to be inspected by a government-approved agency. Furthermore, facing intense public pressure, over 200 global fashion brands and retailers—including major corporations like H&M and Zara, who sourced heavily from Bangladesh—partnered with global trade unions to establish the Accord on Fire and Building Safety in Bangladesh. Established in 2013, this independent, legally binding agreement primarily sought to reform and ensure the health and safety of workers across the country's Ready-Made Garment (RMG) industry.

== Background ==
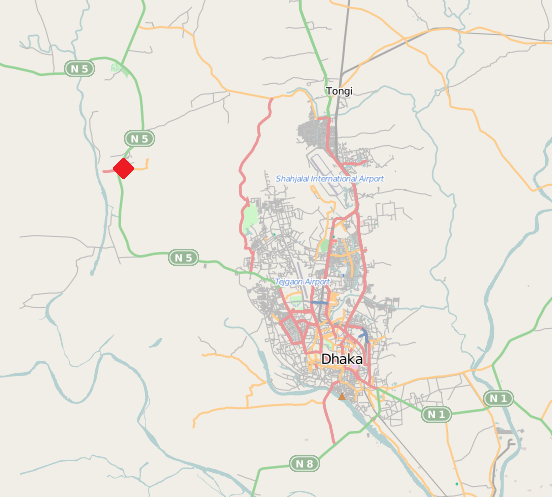
The location of Savar (red marker), the site of the building collapse, in relation to Dhaka.

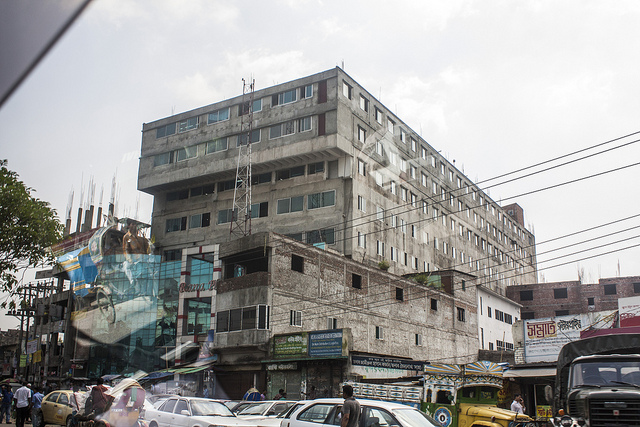
Photo of Rana Plaza taken one year before the collapse.

Rana Plaza was built in 2006 and owned by Sohel Rana—allegedly a member of the local unit of Jubo League (the youth wing of Bangladesh Awami League, the political party in power). It housed a number of separate garment factories, employing around 5,000 people, plus ground-level shops and a bank. The factories manufactured apparel for international brands including Benetton, Zara, The Children's Place, El Corte Inglés, Joe Fresh, Mango, Matalan, Primark, and Walmart.

The head of the Bangladesh Fire Service & Civil Defence, Ali Ahmed Khan, said that the upper four floors had been built without a permit. Rana Plaza's architect, Massood Reza, said the building was "planned for shops and offices, but not factories". Other architects stressed the risks involved in placing factories inside a building designed only for shops and offices, noting the structure was potentially not strong enough to bear the weight and vibration of heavy machinery.

On 23 April 2013 (one day before the collapse), a TV channel reported on and showed footage of cracks in the Rana Plaza building. Upon this broadcast, the building was evacuated, and the shops and the bank on the lower floors were closed. Later in the day, Sohel Rana told the media that the building was "safe", and that workers "should return" the following day. Reportedly, management at Ether Tex threatened to withhold a month's pay from workers who refused to come back to work.

== Collapse and rescue ==
Video clip of rescue work at the collapsed building.

On the morning of 24 April, there was a power outage and diesel generators on the top floor were started. At 08:54 am BST, loud vibrations and rumbling noises erupted on the top floors and spread throughout Rana Plaza, causing many workers to leave their positions and rush towards the exits, but the structural failure started less than a minute later. The building collapsed completely at about 08:57 am BST, leaving only the ground floor intact. The Bangladesh Garment Manufacturers and Exporters Association president confirmed that 3,122 workers were in the building at the time of the collapse. One local resident described the scene as if "an earthquake had struck."

The United Nations' urban search and rescue coordination group – known as the International Search and Rescue Advisory Group (INSARAG) – offered assistance from its members, but the government of Bangladesh rejected this offer. The government made a statement, suggesting that the area's local rescue emergency services were sufficiently well-equipped. Before offering assistance to Bangladesh, the United Nations held consultations and reviews to assess the government's ability to mount an effective rescue operation, reaching the conclusion that they lacked that capability. Bangladeshi officials, desiring to take "face-saving" actions and protect national sensibilities, still refused to accept the assistance offered to them by the UN. A large portion of the rescue operation consisted of inadequately-equipped volunteers, many of whom wore no protective clothing or gear, with mere sandals on their feet. Some buried survivors drank their own urine to survive the high temperatures while waiting to be saved. The Bangladeshi government was accused of favouring national pride over those buried alive; many relatives of those trapped in the debris criticised the government for trying to end the rescue mission prematurely.

One of the garment manufacturers' websites indicates that more than half of the victims were women, along with a number of their children who were in nursery facilities within the building. Bangladeshi Home Minister Muhiuddin Khan Alamgir confirmed that fire service personnel, police and military personnel were assisting with the rescue effort. Volunteer rescue workers used bolts of fabric to assist survivors to escape from the building. 1,700 injured were taken to Enam Medical College and Hospital and 105 to National Institute of Traumatology. A national day of mourning was held on 25 April.

On 8 May, army spokesman Mir Rabbi said the army's attempt to recover more bodies from the rubble would continue for at least another week. On 10 May, 17 days after the collapse, a woman named Reshma was found and rescued alive, and almost unhurt, under the rubble. There were however reports of the rescue being hoax by some outlets.

== Causes ==
The direct reasons for the building problems were:

1. The building having been built on a filled-in pond, which compromised structural integrity,
2. Conversion from commercial use to industrial use,
3. Unauthorised addition of four floors not included in the original building permit,
4. The use of substandard construction material (which led to an overload of the building structure aggravated by vibrations due to the generators and heavy industrialised machinery).

Those various elements indicated dubious business practices by Sohel Rana and dubious administrative practices in Savar.

The collapse of the building was preceded by a number of administrative failures, leading to early warning signs being ignored. It was reported that the industrial police first requested the evacuation of the building until an inspection had been conducted. It was also reported that Abdur Razak Khan, an engineer, declared the building unsafe and requested public authorities to conduct a more thorough inspection; he was arrested for helping the owner illegally add three floors. Kabir Hossain Sardar, the Upazila Nirbahi Officer who visited the site, met with Sohel Rana and declared the building safe. Sohel Rana said to the media that the building was safe and workers should return to work the next day. One manager of the factories in the Rana Plaza reported that Sohel Rana told them that the building was safe. Managers then requested the workers to go back to work. Managers at Ether Tex threatened to withhold a month's pay from workers who refused to come to work. As a result, workers also returned to the factories the next day.

=== Management and safety compliance ===
The decision by managers to send workers back into the factories was partially due to the pressure to complete orders on time, putting partial responsibility for the disaster on the short production deadlines preferred by buyers due to the fast fashion industry. Media including The Guardian have argued the demand for fast fashion and low-cost clothing motivated minimal oversight by clothing brands and that collectively organised trade unions could have responded to the pressure of management. Others have argued that trade unions would increase workforce costs and thus endanger the Bangladesh garment industry.

After the Spectrum factory collapse in 2005, prominent manufacturers organised projects like the Ethical Trading Initiative and Business Social Compliance Initiative (BSCI) to prevent such disasters in the Bangladesh textile industry and elsewhere. These programs ultimately failed to prevent the Savar building collapse. Despite social compliance audits conducted according to BSCI procedure at two of the factories at Rana Plaza, auditors failed to detect the structural concerns. In a press release following the collapse, BSCI explained that their system did not cover building safety. This was contested, as the BSCI audit questionnaire required auditors to check building permits, and discrepancies between the permit and the number of floors in practice were evident. Some have argued that the BSCI has weak incentives to report such violations.

== Aftermath ==
=== Bangladesh ===
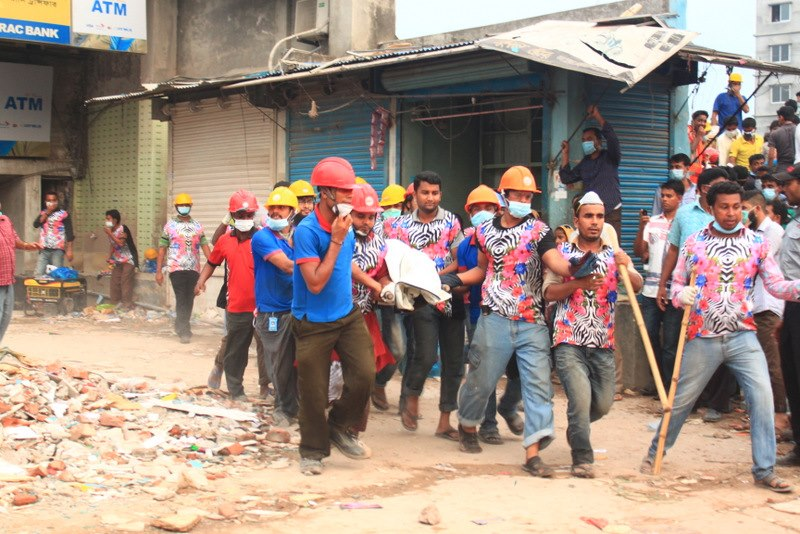
Rescuers carrying out one of the survivors from the collapsed building

The day after the Rana Plaza building collapsed, the Rajdhani Unnayan Kartripakkha (Capital Development Authority) filed a case against the owners of the building and the five garment factories operating inside it. On the same day, dozens of survivors were discovered in the remains of the building. Prime Minister Sheikh Hasina had said in Parliament that the name "Sohel Rana" was not in the Jubo League office bearers list; she then ordered the arrest of Sohel Rana and four of the owners of the garment factories operating in the building. Sohel Rana was reported to have gone into hiding; however, authorities reported that four other individuals had already been arrested in connection with the collapse.

Two days after the building collapsed, garment workers across the industrial areas of Dhaka, Chittagong and Gazipur rioted, targeting vehicles, commercial buildings and garment factories. The next day, leftist political parties and the Bangladesh Nationalist Party-led 18 Party Alliance demanded the arrest and trial of suspects and an independent commission to identify vulnerable factories. Four days after the building collapsed, the owner of the Rana Plaza, Sohel Rana, was arrested at Benapole, Jessore District, on the Indo-Bangladeshi border, by security forces. On the same day a fire broke out at the disaster site and authorities were forced to temporarily suspend the search for survivors.

On 1 May, during International Workers' Day, thousands of protesting workers paraded through central Dhaka to demand safer working conditions and the death penalty for the owner of Rana Plaza. A week later hundreds of survivors of the disaster blocked a main highway to demand wages as the death toll from the collapse passed 700. Local government officials said they had been in talks with the Bangladesh Garment Manufacturers and Exporters Association to pay the workers their outstanding April salaries plus a further three months – £97. After officials promised the surviving workers that they would be soon paid, they ended their protest. The government and garment association were compiling a list of surviving employees to establish who must be paid and compensated. The next day, 18 garment plants, including 16 in Dhaka and two in Chittagong, were closed down. Textile minister Abdul Latif Siddique told reporters that more plants would be shut as part of strict new measures to ensure safety.

On 5 June, police in Bangladesh fired into the air in an attempt to disperse hundreds of former workers and relatives of the victims of the collapse who were protesting to demand back pay and compensation promised by the government and the Bangladesh Garments Manufacturers and Exporters Association. On 10 June, seven inspectors were suspended and accused of negligence for renewing the licenses of garment factories in the building that collapsed. On 30 August, 100 days after the collapse of Rana Plaza, injured workers and family members of those who died there along with workers rights activists inaugurated a memorial for the tragedy, a statue of two fists thrusting towards the sky grasping a hammer and sickle. The police attempted to stop the erection of the memorial several times. It remains the only memorial monument for the tragedy.

On 22 September, at least 50 people were injured when police fired rubber bullets and tear gas into a crowd of protesters who were blocking streets in Dhaka demanding a minimum wage of $100 (৳8,114) a month. In November, a 10-storey garment factory in Gazipur, which supplied Western brands, was allegedly burned down by workers angered over rumours of a colleague's death in police firing.

In March 2014 Rana Plaza owner Sohel Rana was granted six months' bail in the High Court, but he was not released because of additional pending charges. A December 2015 report, written by the NYU Stern Center for Business and Human Rights, found that only eight of 3,425 factories inspected had "remedied violations enough to pass a final inspection" despite the international community's $280 million commitment to clean up Bangladesh's RMG industry. On 14 June 2016 Sohel Rana and 17 others were indicted for violating building code in the construction of Rana Plaza. In August 2016 the trial was postponed after defendants filed appeals with the High Court of Bangladesh.

=== Worldwide criticism ===
==== Politicians ====
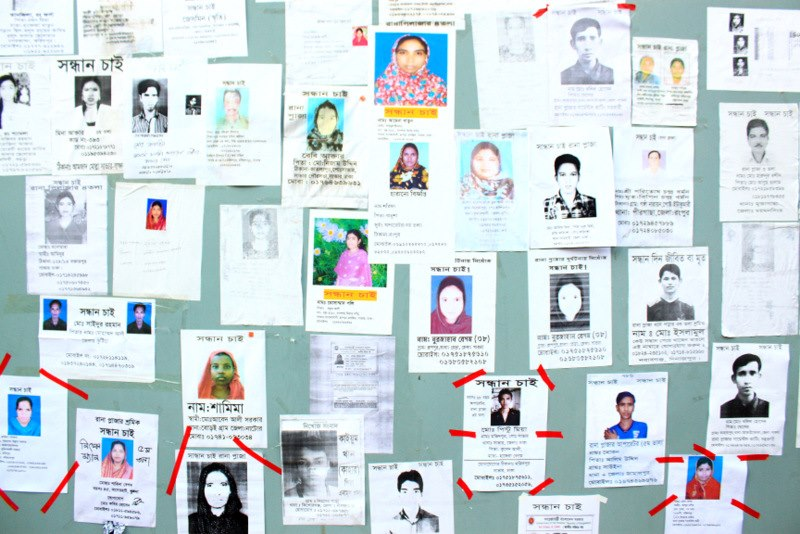
Board with photos of missing people posted by relatives

Nick Clegg, the at the time Deputy Prime Minister of the UK and leader of the Liberal Democrats said: "... consumers have more power than they think when it comes to making choices about where they shop."

Michael Connarty, UK's Falkirk East MP, called on the UK Government to push through new legislation to end modern day slavery by forcing major High Street companies in the UK to audit their supply chain. The framework requests that those companies make vigorous checks to ensure slave labour is not used in third world countries and the UK to produce their goods.

Karel De Gucht, the European Commissioner for Trade, warned that retailers and the Bangladesh government could face action from the EU were nothing done to improve the conditions of workers – adding that shoppers should also consider where they spent their money.

On 1 May, Pope Francis spoke out against the working conditions in the factory:

A headline that really struck me on the day of the tragedy in Bangladesh was 'Living on 38 euros a month'. That is what the people who died were being paid. This is called slave labour. Today in the world this slavery is being committed against something beautiful that God has given us – the capacity to create, to work, to have dignity. How many brothers and sisters find themselves in this situation! Not paying fairly, not giving a job because you are only looking at balance sheets, only looking at how to make a profit. That goes against God!

==== Advocacy groups ====
Human Rights Watch stated their concern over the number of factory-building tragedies in Bangladesh; there have been numerous major accidents in the country in the past decade, including the 2012 Dhaka fire.

IndustriALL Global Union, a global union federation representing textile and garment workers' trade unions around the world, launched an online campaign in support of the Bangladeshi unions' demand for labour law reform in the wake of the disaster. The campaign, hosted on LabourStart, calls for changes in the law to make it easier for unions to organise workers, as well as demanding improved health and safety conditions.

On 27 April, protesters surrounded Primark store on Oxford Street in the City of Westminster in the West End of London. Speaking outside the store, Murray Worthy, from campaign group War on Want, said:

We're here to send a clear message to Primark that the 300 deaths in the Bangladesh building collapse were not an accident – they were entirely preventable deaths. If Primark had taken its responsibility to those workers seriously, no one need have died this week.

Monthly protests at Benetton's flagship store at Oxford Circus in London began on the first anniversary of the collapse. Benetton initially denied reports linking production of their clothing at the factory, but clothes and documents linked to Benetton were discovered at the disaster site. Protestors demanded that Benetton contribute to the compensation fund.

The Institute for Global Labour and Human Rights established a workers' relief fund, which raised $26,000 for injured workers and surviving family members by September 2013.

=== Academia ===
A team of researchers from NYU Stern Center for Business and Human Rights began their investigation which resulted in an April 2014 report entitled "Business as Usual Is Not an Option: Supply Chains and Sourcing after Rana Plaza." A December 2015 report, written by the NYU Stern Center for Business and Human Rights, found that only eight of 3,425 factories inspected had "remedied violations enough to pass a final inspection" despite the international community's $280 million commitment to clean up Bangladesh's RMG industry.

=== Fashion industry response ===
The Accord on Fire and Building Safety in Bangladesh, commonly referred to as the Bangladesh Accord, was established in 2013 in response to the Rana Plaza disaster. It was a five-year, independent, legally binding agreement between global brands, retailers, and trade unions, which sought to ensure the health and safety of workers in Bangladesh's Ready-Made Garment (RMG) industry. This landmark agreement expanded on an earlier memorandum of understanding signed by global brands PVH and Tchibo, marking a significant step toward building a safe and sustainable garment sector in the country.

Walmart, along with 14 other North American companies, refused to sign the Accord as the deadline passed. As of 23 May 2013, thirty-eight companies had signed the accord. Walmart, J.C. Penney and labour activists have been considering an agreement to improve factory safety in Bangladesh for at least two years. In 2011, Walmart rejected reforms that would have had retailers pay more for apparel to help Bangladesh factories improve safety standards.

On 10 July 2013, a group of 17 major North American retailers, including Walmart, Gap, Target and Macy's, announced a plan to improve factory safety in Bangladesh, drawing immediate criticism from labour groups who complained that it was less stringent than an accord reached among European companies. Unlike the accord joined mainly by European retailers, the plan lacks legally binding commitments to pay for those improvements.

Dov Charney, the founder and CEO of American Apparel, was interviewed on Vice.tv and spoke out against the poor treatment of workers in developing countries and referred to it as "slave labour". Charney proposed a "Global Garment Workers Minimum Wage" and discussed in detail many of the inner workings of the modern fast fashion industry commerce practices that led to dangerous factory conditions like at Savar.

In October 2013, Canadian Brad Loewen was given the responsibility of implementing the Accord requirement to upgrade the safety features of 1600 Bangladeshi garment factories. He and his wife, filmmaker Shelagh Carter, moved to Dhaka in December 2013 for an expected five-year term.

By 2023, substantial progress had been made on fire and building safety in the Bangladesh garment industry, but survivors of the collapse still faced uncompensated economic hardships created by physical and psychological injuries.

== Compensation to victims ==
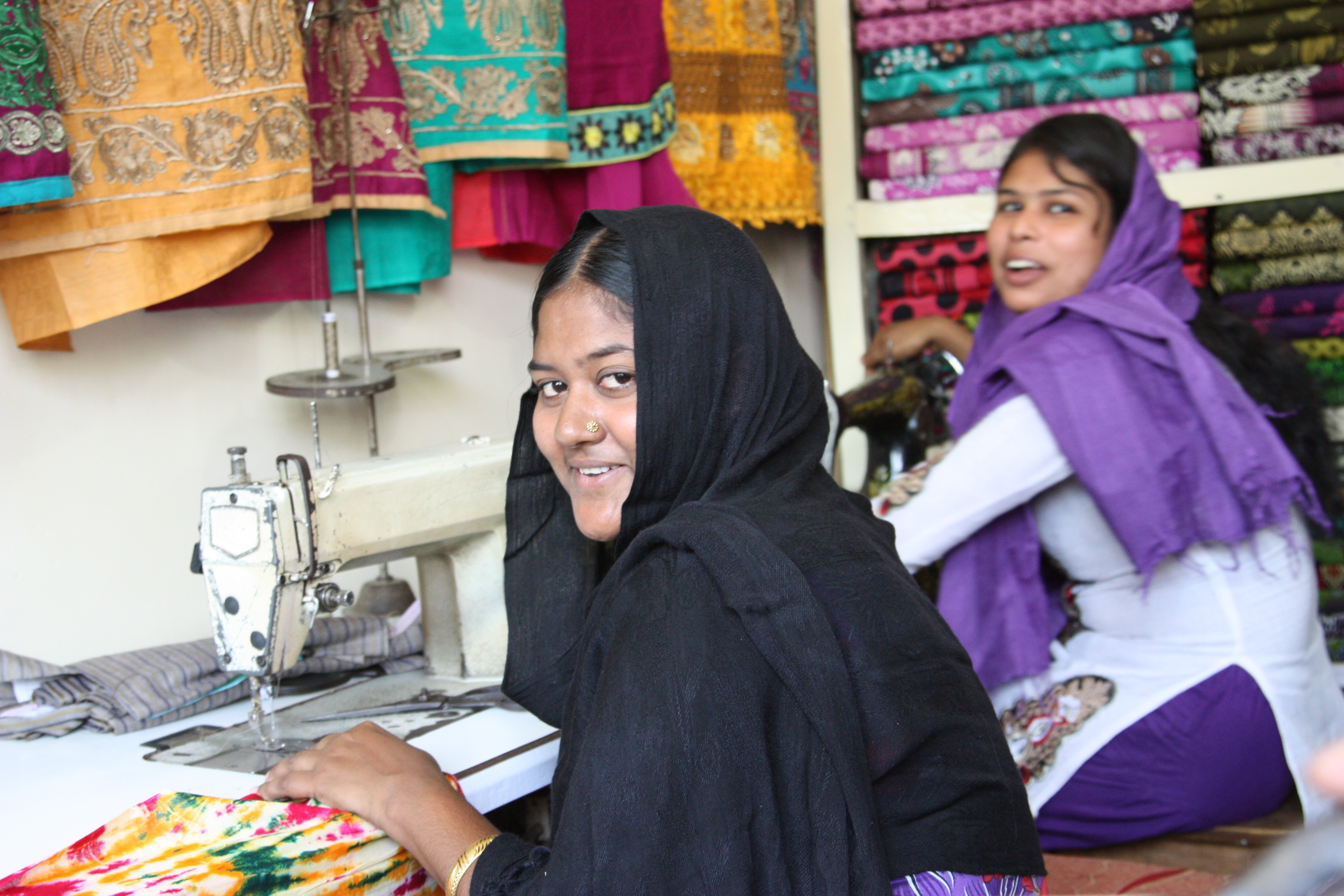
A survivor of the building collapse.

According to the International Labor Rights Forum, full compensation for the families and victims was achieved in 2015.

In mid 2014, Human Rights Watch reported that initial payments of $650 each had been documented.

The initial response to calls for compensation was slow. By mid-September, compensations to families of disaster victims were under discussion only, with many families struggling to survive after having lost their lone wage earner who used to provide them food, shelter, education and health care. Families who had received the $200 compensation from Primark were only those able to provide DNA evidence of their relative's death in the collapse, which proved extremely difficult. The US government provided DNA kits to the families of victims. Primark went on to become the largest contributor of compensation, paying US$12.4 million for deceased, missing, and injury claims.

Of the 29 brands identified as having sourced products from the Rana Plaza factories, only 9 attended meetings held in November 2013 to agree on a proposal to compensate the victims. Several companies refused to sign including Walmart, Carrefour, Auchan and KiK. The agreement was signed by Primark, Loblaw, Bonmarche and El Corte Ingles. By March 2014, seven of the 28 international brands sourcing products from Rana Plaza had contributed to the Rana Plaza Donor's Trust Fund compensation fund, which was backed by the International Labour Organization.

More than 2 dozen victims' families have not been compensated, as they could not document their claims.

== Charges ==
On 15 June 2014, the Bangladesh Anti Corruption Commission filed a case against 14 people for building Rana Plaza with faulty design. On 1 June 2015, murder charges were filed by the Bangladesh Police against 42 people, including the owners of the building, over the collapse. The accused were indicted on 28 July 2016. The case was delayed after the Bangladesh High Court stopped trial proceedings against 5 accused including Savar Mayor Refayat Ullah.

On 29 August 2017, the factory owner, Sohel Rana, was sentenced to a maximum three year imprisonment by a court for failing to declare his personal wealth to the country's anti-graft commission. Rana and 37 others, including government officials, were also charged with murder.

Eight years after the collapse, neither the murder trial nor the building-code trial had concluded; all except for Sohel Rana were on bail, were fugitives, or were dead.

== International reaction ==
The Savar building collapse caused widespread discussions about corporate social responsibility across global supply chains. Based on an analysis of the Savar building collapse, Wieland and Handfield (2013) suggest that companies need to audit products and suppliers; and that supplier auditing needs to go beyond direct relationships with first-tier suppliers. They also demonstrate that visibility must be improved if supply cannot be directly controlled, and that smart and electronic technologies play a key role to improve visibility. Prior to its collapse in 2013, the eight-story commercial building known as Rana Plaza in Savar, Bangladesh, housed multiple garment factories, including New Wave Bottoms, Phantom, and Ether Tex; these manufacturers operated within the complex and produced clothing for a range of domestic and international brands and retailers. Finally, they highlighted the significance of collaboration with local partners, across the industry and with universities to managing social responsibility in supply chains.

The workers' organisation Bangladesh Garment Sramik Sanghati called on the government, international buyers, and factory owners to compensate survivors and victims' families. The group has also asked that April 24 be declared Labour Safety Day in the country.

Global labour and rights groups objected that Western retailers did not do enough to ensure the safety at their suppliers' factories. The companies linked to the Rana Plaza disaster include the Spanish brand Mango, Italian brand Benetton and French retailer Auchan.

On 24 April 2014, thousands of people gathered at an event held to commemorate the first anniversary of the disaster near the building site.

== Documentary ==
Shelagh Carter produced a short documentary, Rana Plaza: Let Not the Hope Die (2014), commemorating the one-year anniversary of the tragedy, while living in Dhaka in support of her husband Brad Loewen's work in implementing the Accord.

== See also ==
- Exploitation of labour
- Final Embrace
- Sweatshop
- The True Cost
- List of disasters in Bangladesh by death toll
- Other garment factory disasters:
  - Triangle Shirtwaist Factory fire (1911)
  - Pakistan garment factory fires (2012)
- Other building collapses:
  - Pemberton Mill (1860 collapse)
  - Collapse of Hotel New World (1986)
  - Sampoong Department Store collapse (1995)
  - Thane building collapse (2013)
  - Riga supermarket roof collapse (2013)
  - Surfside condominium building collapse (2021)
- Organisations
  - Alliance for Bangladesh Worker Safety
  - Accord on Fire and Building Safety in Bangladesh
