= 2012 Pakistan factory fires =

2012 industrial disasters in Karachi and Lahore, Pakistan

Coordinates: 24°51′36″N 67°00′36″E

- Location of incidents shown in Pakistan
- Date: 11 September 2013
- Location: # Baldia Town, Karachi, Sindh; 1. Lahore, Punjab
- Cause: Various ignition sources (still under investigation)
- Casualties: Karachi: 289 people killed by smoke inhalation, burns and stampede Lahore: 25 people killed by smoke inhalation, burns and stampede

Two factories in Pakistan's two largest cities of Karachi and Lahore caught fire on 11 September 2012. The fires occurred in a textile factory in the western part of Karachi and in a shoe factory in Lahore. The fires are considered to be the most deadly and worst industrial factory fires in Pakistan's history, killing 289 people and seriously injuring more than 600.

== Background ==
Pakistan has one of the largest labour and manpower resources in the world, due to its large population. According to data produced by the CIA World Factbook, the total number of Pakistan's labour force at the time was 58.4 million, making it the 10th largest country in terms of available human workforce. About 20.1% of the labour force is involved in industry. The conditions under which Pakistan's blue-collar labour works have often been raised by trade unions and workers' rights organisations. There is also a controversial, yet widespread use of child labour in Pakistan.

The garment factory "Ali Enterprises", which is located in Plot 67, Hub Road, Baldia Town, Karachi, used to export its garments to Europe and the United States, and had employed between 1,200 and 1,500 workers. Ali Enterprises manufactured denim, knitted garments, and hosiery, and had capital of between $10 million and $50 million. Workers at Ali Enterprises said they earned between 5,000 and 10,000 rupees ($52 to $104) a month for their labour. The factory manufactured jeans for textile discounter KiK. KiK claimed to control the enforcement of labour laws and security standards of its suppliers. However, a security check in 2007 revealed deficiencies in fire protection of the Karachi plant, which KiK claimed were fixed by 2011. According to the Pakistani Textile Workers Union (NTUF), a high working pressure and overtime with unpaid additional work were frequent at the factory. A few weeks prior to the fire, the factory passed an internationally recognised safety test. The factory is also suspected of using child labour and locked workplaces analogous to prison cells. The owner of the factory, Abdul Aziz, had reportedly prevented inspections.

== Fires ==
=== Karachi Baldia Town factory ===
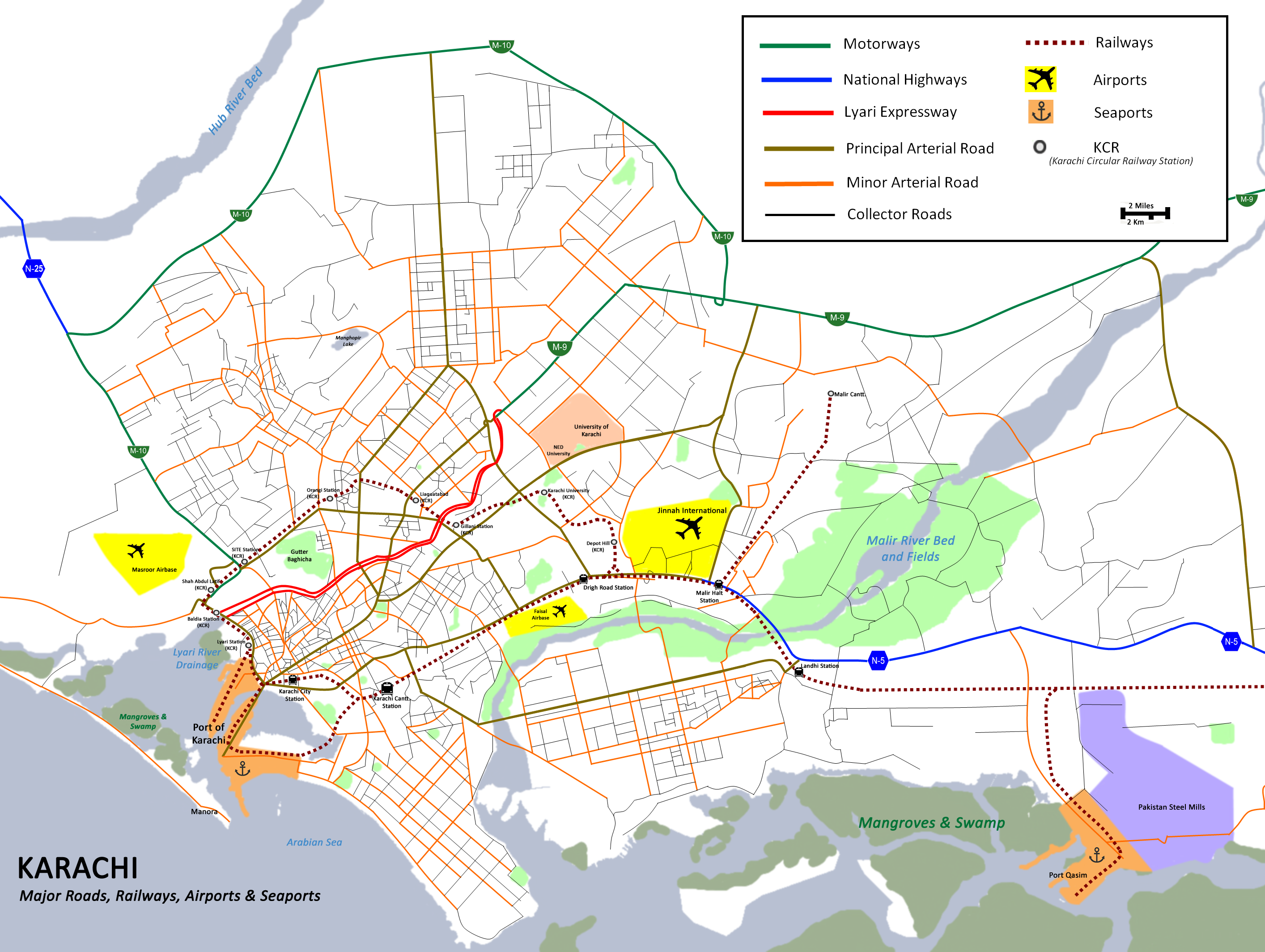
2012 Pakistan factory fires (Karachi)

A private garment factory lit on fire and the flames ignited chemicals that were stored there. The Baldia Town factory inferno case took a dramatic turn on 7 February 2015 when a report by Rangers said that the MQM was behind the deadly fire that claimed the lives of at least 258 factory workers. MQM set fire to the factory to take extortion money from its owners.

The report prepared by a joint investigation team (JIT) was submitted to the Sindh High Court by an additional attorney general, along with a statement of the deputy assistant judge advocate general of Rangers, Major Ashfaque Ahmed.

The statement said the information had been disclosed by suspect Mohammad Rizwan Qureshi, an alleged worker of the MQM, on June 22, 2013, during joint investigation of the factory inferno. According to the JIT report, the MQM worker revealed that a “well-known party high official” had demanded Rs200 million as bhatta (extortion money) through his frontman from Ali Enterprises, the owners of the factory, in August 2012.

Between 300 and 400 workers were inside the factory when the blaze erupted. Officials said that all the exit doors in the factory were locked and many of the windows of the factory were covered with iron bars, which made it difficult for workers to escape at the time and consequently many of the deaths were caused by suffocation. Baldia Town Factory owner names MQM lawmakers, Ex-governor Sindh Ishrat ul Ibad and ex-chief of CPLC Ahmed Chinoy.

2012 Pakistan factory fires (Lahore)

Just weeks before the fire the plant had been given a SA8000 certification.

=== Lahore ===
The shoe factory is located on Band Road in Gulshan-i-Ravi in Lahore. It caught fire when sparks from a faulty electricity generator flew into chemicals. The generator was installed in the garage of the factory compound, which was also the only entry and exit point of the factory.

== Investigation ==
Pakistan's parliament then unanimously passed a resolution asking provincial and federal authorities to fully investigate the accidents. Zohra Yusuf, Chair of The Human Rights Commission of Pakistan has urged government officials to initiate a full probe of the disaster and conditions surrounding the facilities, echoing claims made from the head of firefighting that the factory was dangerous.

The Baldia Town factory inferno case took a dramatic turn when a report by the Pakistan Rangers said that the Muttahida Qaumi Movement was behind the fire that killed at least 258 factory workers. The report prepared by a joint investigation team (JIT) was submitted to the Sindh High Court by an additional attorney general, along with a statement of the deputy assistant judge advocate general of Rangers, Major Ashfaque Ahmed. The statement said the information had been disclosed by suspect Mohammad Rizwan Qureshi, an alleged worker of the MQM, on June 22, 2013, during joint investigation of the factory inferno.

According to the JIT report, the MQM worker revealed that a “well-known party high official” had demanded Rs. 200 million as bhatta (extortion money) through his frontman from Ali Enterprises, the owners of the ill-fated factory, in August 2012.

One of the factory owners in Karachi, Arshad Bhaila, claimed that the fire first broke out in the warehouse and that he called the fire brigade, which arrived about 90 minutes late. The New York Times reported that the local fire department arrived 75 minutes after the fire started. A judicial inquiry headed by Justice Zahid Qurban Alvi reported that a short circuit caused the fire. The report cited several factors that exacerbated the situation leading to the loss of life, including the late arrival of fire tenders, the lack of fire hydrants, and traffic congestion. The tribunal was highly critical of the factory owners and government, which failed to enforce the law. It also criticized the police's forensic department for failing to conduct a scientific investigation.

On 14 September 2012, Justice Hassan Azhar of Sindh High Court Larkana Bench approved Rs. 500,000 bail for factory owners Abdul Aziz, Shahid Bhaila and Arshad Bhaila. All the bank accounts of the owners and the company are frozen and the owners are not allowed to leave the country as they are on exit control list. The owners are facing charges of pre-meditated murder. The Deputy General Secretary of the Pakistan National Federation of Trade Unions (PNFTU) Nasir Manoor said that the owner of the factory, Abdul Aziz, must have fled from the country despite having his name on the Exit Control List (ECL) and he would return only after the issue was off the media radar. The Sindh Building Control Authority (SBCA) denied allegations that it was involved in the approval of the building plans for the Baldia Town garment factory. The C.E.O. of Ali Enterprises, Shahid Bhalia, son of the factory's owner, said that he was innocent and was ready to appear before any court and provide compensation to the victims and their families.

An architectural analysis of the fire was conducted by Forensic Architure (FA), commissioned by European Center for Constitutional and Human Rights (ECCHR). FA made their investigation public on 30 Jan 2018.

On September 23, 2020, an Anti-Terrorism Court convicted eight culprits. The verdict included death sentences for two Muttahida Qaumi Movement workers, Mohammad Zubair alias Charya and Abdul Rehman alias Bhola, and life sentences for four factory gatekeepers (Shahrukh, Fazal Ahmed, Arshad Mehmood, and Ali Mohammad) for failing to open the building's main gates during the fire. In subsequent appellate rulings on 10 June 2026, the Sindh High Court and ultimately the Supreme Court of Pakistan overturned the convictions of Zubair and Abdul Rehman, granting them the benefit of the doubt and acquitting them.

== Aftermath ==
According to the Geo TV, under The Factories Act 1934, the owner will have to pay only Rs. 5000 in penalty over negligence in the protection of workers. The leader of Pakistan Muslim League (N) (PML-N), Nawaz Sharif has announced Rs. 300,000 in aid to the families of those killed in this incident. On 13 September it was reported that the Sindh provincial government would offer financial compensation of Rs. 500,000s to the families of the dead victims and Rs. 50,000 to those who had been injured, while the city's power utility company, KESC, announced they would waive all outstanding balances of the victims as a goodwill gesture. Sindh Chief Minister Syed Qaim Ali Shah also announced further compensation of Rs. 300,000 for the families of the dead and Rs. 50,000 for those who had been injured.

In Lahore, the Punjab Government announced the same value for the families of those killed and Rs. 75,000 for each of those who had been injured as compensation. Real estate tycoon Malik Riaz Hussain also announced cash assistance of Rs. 200,000 for the family members of those killed in both the factory fires and Rs. 100,000 for those who had been injured.

== Reaction ==
President Asif Ali Zardari expressed grave concern over the rising death toll of the fire. He also consoled the bereaved families and directed the authorities concerned to ensure that the best medical assistance was provided to the affected people. He called for a report on the fire in Karachi and Lahore from the governors of the two provinces.

Prime Minister Raja Pervaiz Ashraf, who was on an official trip to China, telephoned Punjab Governor Sardar Latif Khosa and Chief Minister Mian Shahbaz Sharif to express his grief and shock over the fire in Lahore. He also called Sindh Governor Ishratul Ebad to learn about the latest situation regarding the Karachi fire. Ashraf also gave his heartfelt condolences and sympathies to the victims' families. He asked the governors and chief ministers to extend all out assistance and cooperation to the affected people.

Sindh Minister for Industry and Commerce Rauf Siddique announced his resignation as a result of the incident. The Muttahida Qaumi Movement announced three days of mourning. The Chief Justice of Pakistan Iftikhar Muhammad Chaudhry and judges of the Supreme Court of Pakistan also offered condolences and prayed for the victims.

Governor of Sindh Ishrat-ul-Ibad Khan expressed grief over the loss of life in the fire and expressed sympathy with the injured. He then directed the officials concerned to utilise all available resources to control the blaze and ordered an inquiry into the incident. He also directed the respective authorities to ensure the victims do not face any problems in their treatment and recovery. He also prayed for the early recovery of the injured.

=== International reaction ===
- The International Labour Organization's Country Director Francesco d'Ovidio said that akin to other developing countries, working and safety conditions in Pakistan's industrial sector were inadequate. Though the ILO is acquainted with the issues, it acknowledged that it could not be resolved quickly. He further pointed to the need for effective inspection and monitoring, but added that shutting down the illegal and unregistered units would not help as it could lead to massive unemployment.
- China: Ambassador Liu Jian called on the Minister of State for Foreign Affairs Malik Amad Khan on 13 September to convey his condolences on behalf of the government and people of China. He also presented cheques of Rs. 3million on behalf of the Chinese government for the families of victims.
- France: The embassy quoted a Ministry of Foreign Affairs statement: "We were deeply shocked to learn that two fires in Pakistan – in Karachi and in Lahore – have, according to the latest report, resulted in the death of more than 200 people. In these painful circumstances, we extend our condolences to the families and friends of the victims."
- India: Prime Minister Manmohan Singh offered his condolences to his Pakistani counterpart, Raja Pervaiz Ashraf.
- Iran: President Mahmoud Ahmadinejad offered condolences to the Pakistani government and the country saying: "The news on getting killed and wounded of a large number of your good self's citizens following two vast and horrendous fire incidents in cities of Karachi and Lahore deeply saddened and depressed us, and that while condoling with you, the Pakistan government, and noble Pakistani nation, personally, and on behalf of the Iranian government and the great Iranian nation, I pray to Almighty Allah for the salvation of the souls of the bygone victims, fast recovery of the injured victims, patience for the victims' bereaved families, and prosperity and wellbeing for the friend and brother Pakistani nation."
- Qatar: Emir Sheikh Hamad bin Khalifa Al Thani sent a cable to Pakistani President Asif Ali Zardari expressing his condolences and sympathies to the families of victims. Deputy Emir Sheikh Tamim bin Hamad Al Thani and Prime Minister Hamad bin Jassem bin Jabor Al Thani sent a similar cable to Zardari.
- United Kingdom: Baroness Warsi, senior minister of state for Foreign and Commonwealth Affairs, also expressed her grief.
- United States: The chargé d'affaires at the U.S. embassy, Richard Hoagland, offered condolences in a press release. on behalf of the U.S. government and its people to Pakistan Lahore Consul General Nina Maria Fite also extended condolences on behalf of the consulate and the U.S. people.
- The Asian Human Rights Commission conveyed its sincere condolences to the families who lost loved ones and friends in these fires and calls on the government of Pakistan to ensure a credible and transparent investigation into their cause.

== Depiction in media ==
A documentary film about the Karachi Baldia Town factory fire, Discount workers, was made in 2020.

== See also ==
- 2013 Dhaka garment factory collapse
- Child labour in Pakistan
- List of industrial disasters
- 2026 Gul Plaza Shopping Mall fire
