= Rupganj factory fire =

2021 fire in Narayanganj District, Bangladesh

- Location of Dhaka Division in Bangladesh
- Date: 9 July 2021
- Location: Rupganj, Rupganj Upazila, Narayanganj District, Dhaka Division, Bangladesh; 23.7644°N 90.5564°E
- Deaths: 52
- Injuries: 20

On 9 July 2021, a fire at a food and drink factory left at least 52 people dead and another 20 were injured. The fire occurred at the Shezan juice factory in Rupganj, an industrial town in Narayanganj District, Bangladesh.

The same day, the owner of Sajeeb Group, whose subsidiary Hashem Foods owns the juice factory, his four sons, and three other company executives were arrested in connection with the fire. They are facing various charges including murder, attempted murder, and intentionally causing serious injury.

The factory was built illegally, had no emergency exits and was lacking in adequate safety measures. Chemicals and other flammable materials were also stored within the factory, which employed workers as young as 11 years old.

== See also ==
- 2012 Dhaka garment factory fire
