= February 2019 Dhaka fire =

Fire that broke out in Chawkbazar, Dhaka, Bangladesh on 20 Feb. 2019

- Fire location (Dhaka)
- Date: 20 February 2019; 7 years ago
- Time: 22:38 BST (UTC+06:00)
- Location: Chowk Bazaar, Dhaka Old City, Bangladesh; 23.7165°N 90.3941°E
- Cause: Gas cylinder explosion
- Deaths: 81
- Injuries: 50+

On 20 February 2019, a fire broke out in Dhaka, Bangladesh following a road accident between a pickup van and a private car. After the collision, the car's gas cylinder exploded. The fire then spread to a group of nearby buildings being used to store chemicals, and quickly spread in the densely packed historic district of Chowk Bazaar in Old Dhaka. The fire left at least 81 dead and 50 others injured.

== Cause ==
The fire was reported to have originated in the explosion of a cylinder of compressed natural gas in a vehicle, which quickly triggered further fires in buildings and nearby gas cylinders. The blaze was first reported at 22:38, and was reported to be under control by about 03:00.

The first building to burn housed shops and a warehouse storing plastic goods, cosmetics and perfume on the first floor, with residential housing on upper stories. The fire spread to the four-storey building behind the Shahi Mosque. From that building, the fire spread to Rajmoni Restaurant and three other buildings in the narrow alley.

An electric transformer exploded just after the fire broke out, which demolished several cars parked on the alley. The alley was full of people because of a wedding ceremony in a nearby community centre.

== Casualties ==
As of 21 February 2019, the death toll was estimated to be at least 81. In addition to those killed, at least 50 people were injured and transported to hospitals with severe burns and lung damage.

== Reactions ==
Mohammad Abdul Hamid, the President of Bangladesh, and Sheikh Hasina, the Prime Minister of Bangladesh, offered their condolences to the victims of the fire, as did Jatiya Party Chairman H. M. Ershad and many others.

In the aftermath of the fire, Dhaka South City Corporation Mayor Sayeed Khokon said chemical warehouses would no longer be permitted in the city.

Pakistan's Foreign Office Spokesperson expressed deep regret over the loss of life.

The United States embassy in Dhaka offered its condolences to the victims of the fire via Twitter.

== Financial assistance ==
The Ministry of Labour and Employment of Bangladesh offered ৳100,000 to the family of each deceased victim, and ৳50,000 to each of the injured.

== See also ==
- 2010 Dhaka fire
- 2012 Dhaka fire
- FR Tower fire
