= 2010 Dhaka fire =

Fire in the Nimtali area of Dhaka, Bangladesh, on 3 June 2010

Coordinates: 22.331306°N 91.81233°E

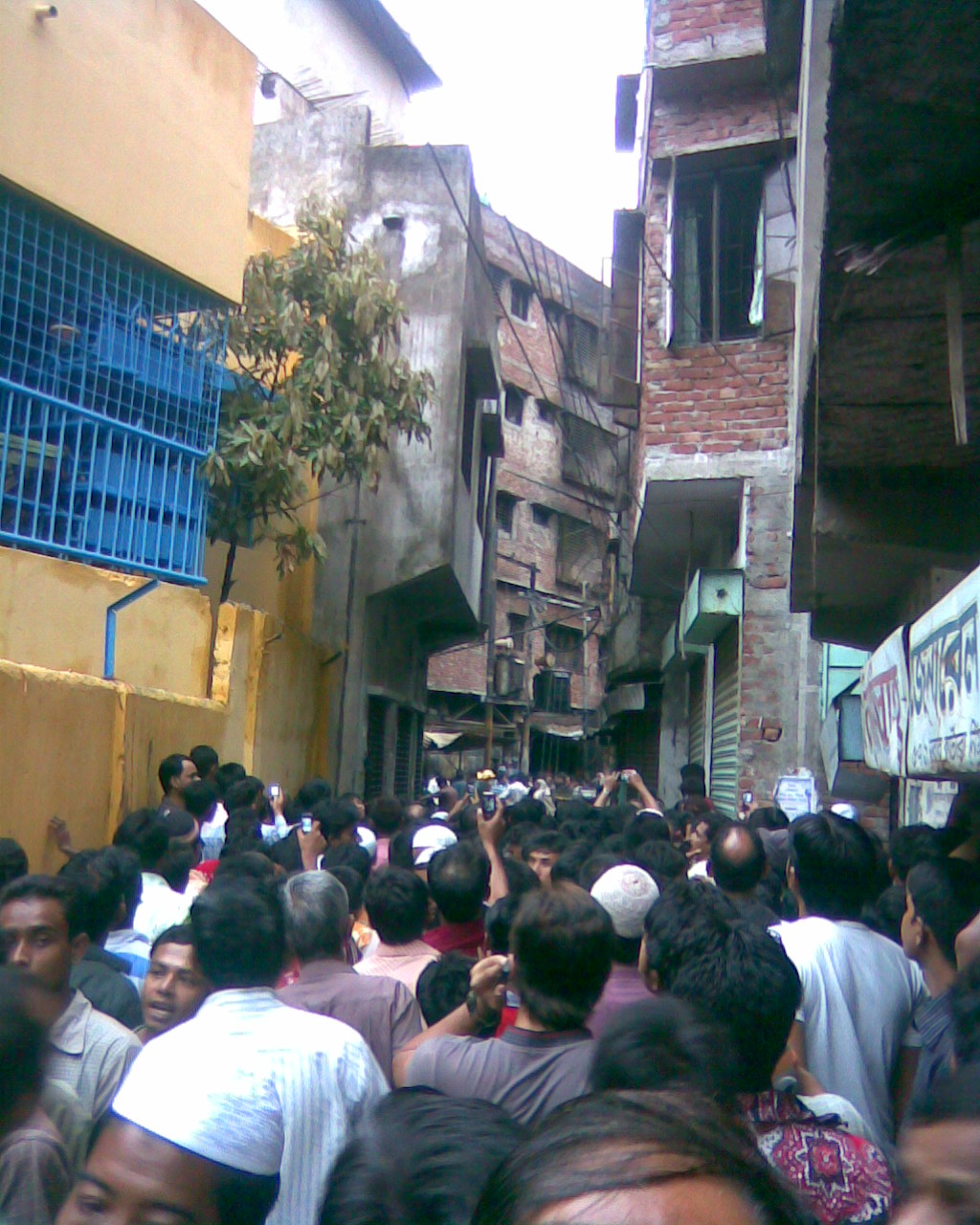
- A crowd of people day after the fire. The burnt buildings are in the centre.
- Date: 3 June 2010
- Time: 10.30 pm BST Time
- Location: Nimtoli, Old Dhaka, Bangladesh
- Also known as: Nimtoli tragedy
- Cause: Electricity
- Deaths: 126
- Injuries: Approximately 200

The 2010 Dhaka fire was a fire in the city of Dhaka, Bangladesh, on 3 June 2010, that killed at least 124 people (117 on spot, others later in hospital). The fire occurred in the Nimtali area of Old Dhaka.

== Cause ==
The fire was started when an electrical transformer exploded. The head of the fire department speculated that the fire was fanned by perfumes, chemicals and other flammable products stored in nearby shops. The density of the residential area affected made it difficult for firefighters to quell the blaze. Also, the narrow lanes of Old Dhaka and staircases of old buildings made it challenging for fire service equipment to reach the site.

== Casualties ==
The fire affected multiple residential buildings in the Nimtoli area, and trapped residents inside apartments. The fire started at 10.30 pm and lasted for over three hours. At least 117 people were killed and over 100 injured by the fire. The fire affected a wedding party, which exacerbated the casualties. One of the buildings affected by the fire had no fire escapes and its windows were covered by metal bars.

The injured were treated at the Dhaka Medical College Hospital, which struggled to cope with the large number of patients suffering burns and smoke inhalation. According to a doctor at the hospital, most of the deaths appeared to have been caused by smoke inhalation rather than burns.

Rescue operations ceased on 4 June 2010.

== Reactions ==
Sheikh Hasina, the Prime Minister, ordered an investigation into the fire. She also offered condolences to the victims and their families. The government announced that 5 June 2010 would be a day of mourning. The Bangladesh cricket team, who took the field the day after the fire during their tour of England, wore black armbands in remembrance.

== Financial assistance ==
Mirza Ali Behrouze Ispahany the chairman of M.M. Ispahani came up with financial assistance for the victims.

== See also ==
- List of historic fires
