= 2026 Bangladesh garment workers protests =

Ongoing labour protests in Bangladesh

- Date: August 2026 – present
- Location: Greater Dhaka, Bangladesh
- Caused by: High inflation and rising cost of living; Dissatisfaction with factory owner wage counter-offers
- Goals: Increase minimum monthly wage from ৳12,500 to ৳30,000; Brand purchasing-price transparency; Release of detained union leaders
- Methods: Factory strikes and walkouts; Street demonstrations and roadblocks; Tripartite labor negotiations
- Status: Ongoing

Parties
Garment Workers Alliances & Trade Unions: Communist Party of Bangladesh; Bangladesh Trade Union Centre (BTUC); Bangladesh Garment Workers Trade Union Centre (GWTUC); Bangladesh Jatiyatabadi Sramik Dal (factions); Garment Workers Unity Forum (GWUF); Sramik Karmachari Oikya Parishad (SKOP); Socialist Party of Bangladesh; Socialist Labour Front (SLF); Garment Workers Rights Movement (GWRM); Ekota Garments Sramik Federation (EGSF); Green Bangla Garments Workers Federation (GBGWF); IndustriALL Bangladesh Council (until 2 November); National Garment Workers Federation (NGWF); Bangladesh Independent Garment Workers Union Federation (BIGUF); United Federation of Garments Workers (UFGW); Federation of Garments Workers (FGW); Bangladesh Garment and Industrial Workers Federation (BGIWF); Sommilito Garments Sramik Federation (SGSF); Bangladesh Sweater Garment Workers Federation (BSGWF); Bangladesh Institute of Labour Studies (BILS); Centre for Policy Dialogue (CPD)	Employers & State Authorities: Bangladesh Garment Manufacturers and Exporters Association; Bangladesh Knitwear Manufacturers and Exporters Association; Government of Bangladesh; Ministry of Home Affairs; Bangladesh Police; Dhaka Metropolitan Police; Gazipur Metropolitan Police; Industrial Police; Border Guard Bangladesh; Bangladesh Ansar; Special Response Battalion; Ministry of Labour and Employment; Minimum Wage Board; Bangladesh Nationalist Party; Bangladesh Jatiotabadi Chatra Dal; Bangladesh Jatiotabadi Jubodal

Lead figures
Montu Ghosh (GWTUC); Joly Talukder (GWTUC); Anwar Hossain (Sramik Dal); Mushrefa Mishu (GWUF); Nazma Akter (SGSF); Babul Akhter (BGIWF); Kamrul Hasan (EGSF); AAM Foyez Hossain (BSGWF); Syed Sultan Uddin Ahmed (BILS)	Mahmud Hasan Khan (BGMEA); Mohammad Hatem (BKMEA); Minimum Wage Board officials

Number
"Tens of thousands of workers" to up to a million.	10,000+ police officers

Casualties
- Injuries: Gazipur (31 October): At least 30 people, including both garment workers and law enforcement personnel were injured.; Mirpur, Dhaka (1–2 November): At least 20 people, including four to five police; (3 November): 10 police officers injured; Savar (4 November): Over 50 Injured, including 4 journalists; Fatullah, Narayanganj District (4 November): Dozens of people were injured.
- Arrested: Multiple union leaders and regional figures detained; Gazipur Metropolitan Police and Industrial Police have arrested around 70 people across 12 cases.
- Charged: 10,500 "unidentified individuals" have been accused across 5 different cases in Mirpur and Pallabi areas of Dhaka; More than 5000 anonymous individuals sued in Gazipur; Thousands of anonymous individuals sued in Narayanganj
- Economic impact: Widespread closure of garment factories across manufacturing hubs

A series of labour demonstrations organized by workers in the ready-made garment industry have taken place in Bangladesh, demanding an increase in the sector's minimum monthly wage from ৳12,500 (US$100) to ৳30,000 (US$240). Began in August 2026, the protests escalated in late-October and early-November 2026 in the industrial areas of Ashulia, Gazipur and Dhaka. On 1 November 2026, the government announced the formation of a six-member Minimum Wage Board including factory owners, though protests continued after the announcement due to not meeting demands.

== Background ==
Bangladesh's garment industry is the second-largest in the world, after China, and contributes about 10 percent of the country's gross domestic product. According to the Bangladesh Garment Manufacturers and Exporters Association (BGMEA), the industry has around 4,000 registered factories employing more than four million workers, an estimated 65 percent of whom are women.

Labour unrest in Bangladesh is primarily driven by a combination of wages and cost of living. The sector's previous minimum wage of ৳8,000 was in place from 2018 and, according to the Fair Labor Association, had fallen below the World Bank poverty line for a two- to three-person household by 2022. The association also found that garment workers' wages had barely increased since 2019 despite high inflation. The current minimum of ৳12,500 was declared by the Minimum Wage Board in November 2023. The decision was followed by protests in Gazipur, and the Clean Clothes Campaign described the new rate as a "poverty wage". In April 2026 an amendment to the Bangladesh Labour Act reduced the minimum wage review cycle for the sector from five years to three. Most of the wages earnt in the industry are then spent on paying rent, leaving little for food or education expenses.

The Global Living Wage Coalition, using the Anker methodology, estimated the 2025 monthly living wage at ৳30,459 for Dhaka City and ৳25,166 for the satellite cities and districts surrounding Dhaka, where most of the country's garment industry is located. The Dhaka City estimate is based on a family of four with 1.58 full-time workers and a monthly cost of a basic but decent living of ৳48,022.

== Protests ==
The protests and labour strikes forced more than 529 garment factories to shut down and left almost 1,000,000 workers out of work as a result of the strikes.

=== August–October 2026 ===
In early to mid-October 2026, garment workers in several parts of the country held protests demanding a minimum wage of around ৳30,000, citing rising inflation and stagnant pay, while unions and labour organisations called for the formation of a new Minimum Wage Board under the shortened review cycle.

In the early-middle of October 2026, RMG workers from multiple factories in Uttara of Dhaka blocked the Dhaka–Mymensingh highway in the area, demanding a ৳30,000 minimum wage. The police threw sound grenades, tear gas and charged batons as the workers refused to leave. On 15 October, more than a thousand RMG workers in Gazipur blocked the same highway over unpaid wages from September. When workers refused to disperse, police used sound grenades to disperse workers who refused to leave the highway.

=== 31 October 2026 ===
On 31 October, workers in Ashulia, a garment manufacturing hub on the outskirts of Dhaka, staged protests demanding higher pay, and factory management suspended operations in dozens of factories. According to the Ashulia Industrial Police, about 30 factories declared holidays on that day.

=== 1 November 2026 ===
On 1 November, workers blocked the Dhaka–Tangail Highway in Gazipur and a road at the Mirpur 10 intersection in Dhaka. Thousands continued protesting around Dhaka after the government's wage board announcement. Police fired tear gas and sound grenades during clashes with protesters, and according to police, clashes in Ashulia injured several people, including police officers. The Indian news agency Asian News International reported vandalism in Mirpur and in the Konabari area of Gazipur, including damage to police outposts. The government deployed the paramilitary Border Guard Bangladesh alongside police. In the Mirpur area in the morning, the police were reported to have fired tear gas and charged batons at the protesters, alongside the police and workers throwing bricks at each other.

According to The Daily Star, almost all RMG factories in the greater Mirpur area, and about 50 factories in Ashulia and Gazipur, closed down for the day due to the protests.

=== 2–4 November ===
Authorities also initiated legal proceedings against thousands of unidentified individuals. Over 500 factories temporarily closed down by 2 November, with increasing police presence in the industrial areas of Gazipur, Ashulia and Mirpur. Ten Border Guard Bangladesh (BGB) platoons were deployed in Gazipur. On 3 November, ten BGB platoons were deployed in the Safipur, Kaliakair and Konabari areas of Gazipur, and two in Chashara, Narayanganj. About 670 factories closed while the protest resulted in vandalized factories and vehicles being set on fire. The protesters threw bricks and stones and the police used sound grenades and tear gas against the protesters. H&M said its supply chains had experienced no major disruption. On 4 November, the number of deployed BGB platoons rose to 24. A worker named Toufiq Sheikh (also reported as Toufiq Hossain) died following an injury during the protests. Multiple political and labor groups held protests and rallies in response to his death.

Simultaneously, law enforcement launched a massive legal crackdown, filing sweeping lawsuits that targeted thousands of anonymous individuals. Following the initial clashes, the Gazipur Metropolitan Police and Industrial Police registered 12 separate cases charging more than 5,000 unidentified suspects with arson and vandalism. In Narayanganj, police filed an anti-terrorism case early on 4 November at the Fatullah Model Police Station, naming 21 individuals while leveling sweeping charges against an additional 1,500 unnamed persons. Labor leaders of IndustriALL Global Union and human rights groups warned that these case filings with thousands of anonymous slots created an intense atmosphere of panic, leaving ordinary, innocent workers in constant fear of arbitrary arrest during late-night housing raids.

=== 5 November ===
The Minimum Wage Board officially agreed in principle to increase the monthly minimum salary for textile workers, effective December 2026. However, the board failed to specify an exact figure. In reaction, intense localized protests occurred in the Ashulia industrial zone, where thousands of workers staged walkouts and blockaded the Abdullahpur–Baipail highway. The Ashulia Industrial Police Superintendent Mohammad Mominul Islam Bhuiyan claimed that "protesters threw bricks at police and vandalised police vehicles" so in response the police "had to use tear gas and sound grenades".

=== 9–12 November ===
The Minimum Wage Board held its second meeting in Dhaka on 9 November. Workers' representative Babul Akhter proposed a minimum wage structure and stated that the basic cost of living for a family of four required ৳45,000 to ৳60,000 a month. At that meeting, factory owners submitted no counterproposal. The board gave factory owners four business days to submit it, warning that the workers' demand would proceed without their proposal if they missed the deadline. On the same day, Border Guard Bangladesh deployed 34 platoons across Dhaka, Gazipur, and Narayanganj.

Proposed RMG Monthly Minimum Wage Structure
Grade / Category	Proposed Monthly Wage (BDT)
Grade 1	৳48,000
Grade 2	৳43,000
Grade 3	৳38,000
Grade 4 (lowest grade)	৳32,000
Apprentice	৳30,000

On 10 November, after a multi-day break commemorating the National Revolution and Solidarity Day, protests restarted across Ashulia and Gazipur as workers opposed delayed wage announcements and plans by owners to introduce a "no work, no pay" rule. Clashes with police using tear gas, sound grenades, and batons left at least three injured on the Baipail–Abdullahpur highway. Police denied using rubber bullets or shotguns. The Business Standard reported over 140 factories suspended operations and that "owners may decide on indefinite closure".

On 11 November, even as holidays were declared by factories to mitigate protests, clashes continued in Jamgora, Nischintapur, Narsinghpur, and Zirabo areas of Ashulia, as well as near Padmar Mor in Hemayetpur, Savar. Police fired tear gas shells and sound grenades as workers hurled brickbats at police while attempting to block the Hemayetpur–Singair and Baipail–Abdullahpur highways. The Bangladesh Garment Manufacturers and Exporters Association (BGMEA) held an emergency meeting to discuss the labour issues.

On 12 November, after seven factories of Kaliakair Upazila declared holidays for the day, workers blocked the Dhaka–Tangail highway in the Mouchak area, keeping their demands for the ৳30,000 minimum wage. Police fired sound grenades and chased the workers, forcing them to leave the highway. Across Savar, Ashulia, and Gazipur, workers entered into factories and subsequently refused to work. Garment factory owners threatened to shut their factories for an indefinite period under the Bangladesh Labour Act if the labour unrest continued.

=== 13–16 November ===
On 13 November, during the weekly Friday holiday, no highway blockades occoured, though many factories remained closed. Leaders of several garment worker groups held a joint press conference at the Dhaka Reporters Unity. President of the Shadhin Bangla Garments Sramik-Karmachari Federation Mir Abul Kalam Azad declared, "If anyone is found to have been involved in vandalising factories, the government should take appropriate action. But we believe no workers were involved". The organisations also demanded the immediate release of arrested workers and trade unionists, the withdrawal of all cases filed against them as well as government-funded medical treatment for injured workers. They also alleged that political and business groups were instigating factory vandalism to disrupt the wage movement.

On 14 November, protests restarted in Ashulia and Gazipur as workers attempted to block roads in Ashulia and Gazipur, where police clashed with demonstrators in the Palli Bidyut area and dispersed street blockades after more than an hour. Garment factories numbering 147 and employing more than 300,000 workers remained closed in Savar, Ashulia, and Gazipur. Managers at dozens of plants in Ashulia posted indefinite closure notices. The Bangladesh Garment Manufacturers and Exporters Association (BGMEA) and the Bangladesh Knitwear Manufacturers and Exporters Association (BKMEA) threatened to withdraw from Minimum Wage Board negotiations and close factories indefinitely without pay from 15 November under Section 13 (1) of the Bangladesh Labour Act, 2006 if workers did not return to work.

On 15 November, protests continued despite warnings from the BGMEA and the BKMEA to enforce "no work, no pay" closures under Section 13 (1) of the Bangladesh Labour Act, 2006. Production remained suspended at approximately 121 garment factories across those areas as workers walked out or declined to report for duty, including more than 50 closed factories and five work stoppages in Savar and Ashulia. In Gazipur, protesting workers blockaded the Dhaka–Tangail highway for an hour before being dispersed with tear gas by the Bangladesh Police and Industrial Police, while Gazipur Metropolitan Police Superintendent Mohammad Amjad Hossain reported that 13 factories had been shut down indefinitely the previous night and another 16 closed during the morning. 48 platoons of the Border Guard, Ansar, and Special Response Battalion (formerly known as the Rapid Action Battalion) were deployed across industrial zones in Dhaka, Gazipur, and Narayanganj.

In response to the shutdowns, Garment Workers Trade Union Centre (GWTUC) Vice President Joly Talukder told BBC Newshour,

Workers have carried the costs for years while factory owners and global retailers profit from their exploitation. They are asking for a wage they can survive on. How can any person of conscience stand against such a basic human demand?

== Demands ==
The central demand of protesting workers is a minimum monthly wage of ৳30,000, more than double the existing rate. Workers say rising costs of food, housing, transport and healthcare have sharply reduced their purchasing power. Labour organisations have proposed other figures: thirty-five labour federations under four alliances called for ৳37,125, and the IndustriALL Bangladesh Council called for ৳32,000.

== Reactions ==
Human Rights Watch published a report stating that authorities used excessive force, including batons and tear gas against the protesting garment workers. The organisation also reported that police arrested political opponents and labour leaders on accusations of sabotage and incitement rather than addressing wage demands. The report wrote that the current authorities have explicitly blamed the formerly ruling Awami League for instigating the protests and sabotage, though independent observers and labour unions note these accusations are politically motivated and lack publicly verified evidence. Furthermore, they documented widespread violence by thugs hired by factory owners to suppress the unrest, noting that these encounters led to severe property destruction, arson, factory vandalism, and the death of 21-year-old garment worker Toufiq Hossain (also reported as Toufiq Sheikh), who was beaten to death after getting caught between protesters and factory-hired men. The rights monitor also documented that the ruling Bangladesh Nationalist Party's youth wing, Jatiotabadi Jubodal, and student wing Chhatra Dal targeted protesting workers, while police filed broad cases under the Anti-Terrorism Act against thousands of unnamed individuals. Human Rights Watch called on authorities to immediately end cycles of violence and intimidation, emphasising that the government and international apparel brands must ensure fair contracting and protect workers' fundamental right to peaceful assembly.

Amnesty International has expressed deep concern over the targeting of garment workers and trade union leaders in Bangladesh demanding a higher minimum wage, including the 17 November arrest of Green Bangla Garments Workers Federation (GBGWF) President Sultana Begum and General Secretary Md Elias shortly after they participated in an international webinar on the protests. They urged authorities to immediately halt arbitrary arrests, respect the rights to peaceful assembly, freedom of association, and collective bargaining, and ensure law enforcement clearly distinguishes between peaceful demonstrators and individuals responsible for violent acts.

The American Apparel & Footwear Association (AAFA) sent a formal letter to Prime Minister Tarique Rahman urging an annual minimum wage review mechanism and tripartite consultations aligned with the International Labour Organization (ILO). The association called for safeguards against violence, threats, intimidation and discrimination. It also asked the government to stop arrests of peaceful protesters and union leaders, saying such steps would build confidence in wage-setting institutions, strengthen social dialogue and support the implementation of agreed wage adjustments.

On 1 November 2026, the government formed a six-member Minimum Wage Board composed of representatives of the government, workers and factory owners, tasked with setting a new minimum wage. The board is chaired by Senior District and Sessions Judge Sheikh Ashfaqur Rahman. Workers are represented by Babul Akhter, general secretary of the Bangladesh Garments and Industrial Workers Federation, and Anwar Hossain, president of the Bangladesh Jatiyatabadi Sramik Dal.

Labour and Employment Minister Ariful Haque Chowdhury warned that prolonged factory closures and production disruptions could delay export shipments and payments from international buyers.

Around late afternoon on 1 November 2026, Tarique Rahman, the Prime Minister of Bangladesh, planned an emergency meeting with various other ministers, including Ariful Haque Chowdhury and the Home Minister Salahuddin Ahmed, in response to the protests. Their meeting started at 6:00 p.m. of the same day at the Bangladesh Secretariat.

== See also ==
- 2023 Bangladesh garment workers strike
- Economy of Bangladesh#Economic depression (2022–present)
- Women in Bangladesh
