= 2023 Bangladesh garment workers strike =

Labor strike in Bangladesh

- Date: October 23, 2023 - Current
- Location: Dhaka, Bangladesh
- Goals: Raise from 8,300 to 23,000 taka monthly wages

Parties
Bangladesh Garment and Industrial Workers Federation (BGIWF) (affiliated to IndustriALL Global Union)	Bangladesh Garment Manufacturers and Exporters Association

Number
10,000's strikers	

Casualties and losses
At least 2 worker deaths	

The 2023 Bangladesh garments workers strike is a labor dispute between Bangladesh Garment and Industrial Workers Federation (BGIWF) and Bangladesh Garment industry, principally over wages.

== Background ==
The 4 million Bangladesh garment workers earn monthly wages starting at 8,300 taka ($75 US). The garment union has called for a raise to 23,000 taka ($209 US) monthly wage. The Bangladesh Garment Manufacturers and Exporters Association (BGMEA), which represents the garment industry, offered to increase the monthly minimum wage to 12,500 taka ($113 US) which the union rejected.

== Strike ==
The strike began on October 23, 2023, in Dhaka, Bangladesh, causing over 600 factories to shut down.

On November 4, striking garment workers clashed with the police at Ashulia, west of Dhaka. Where around 10,000 workers were picketing and attempted to prevent other workers from returning to their shifts, reportedly hurling stones and bricks at officers, factories, and trying to block roads. They were dispersed through tear gas, while 1,500 police had been deployed to Ashulia and nearby Savar.

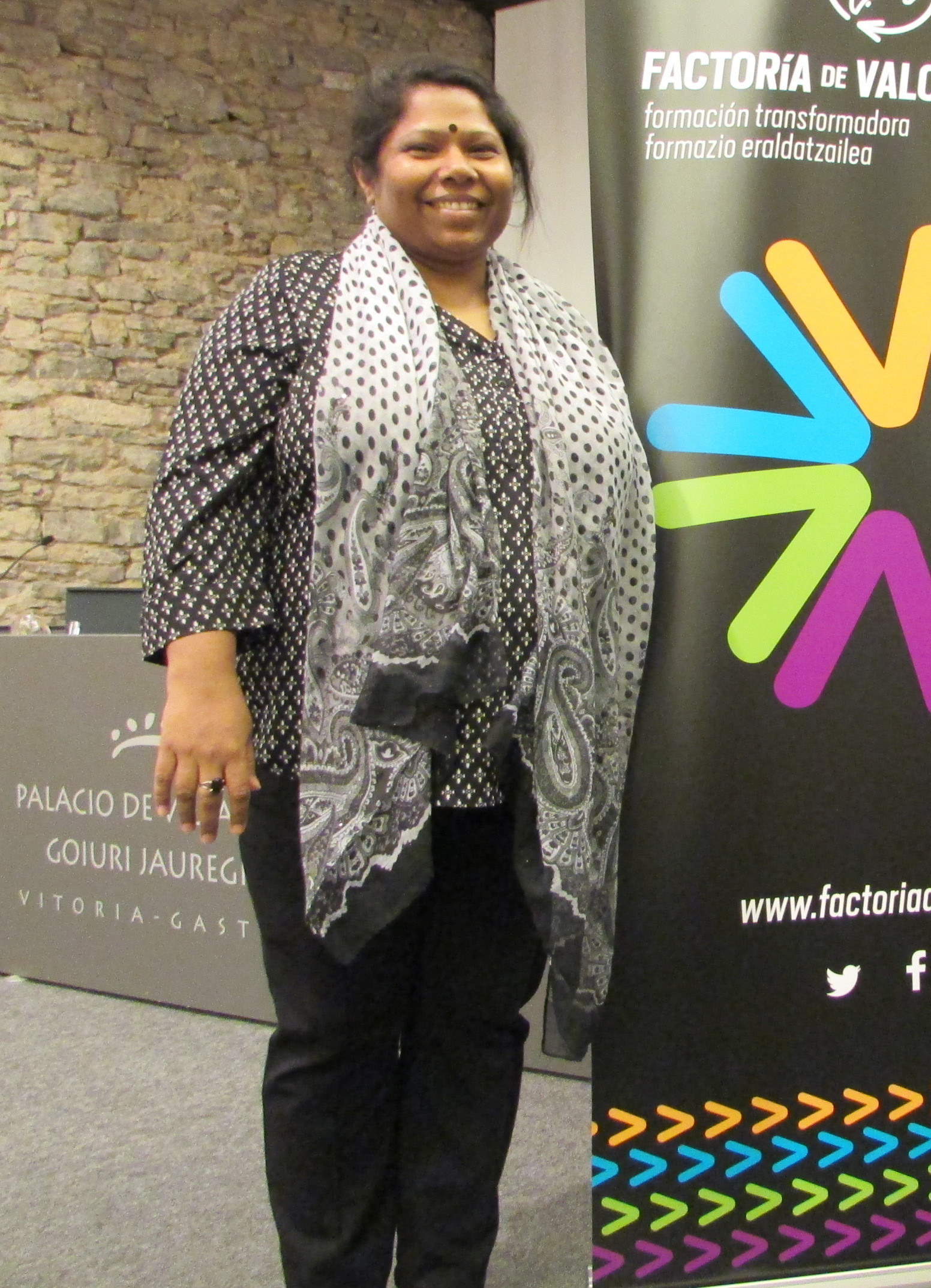
Kalpona Akter, president of the BGIWF textile union.

BGIWF's Union president said of the situation,

"Brands and retailers only care about smooth shipments and profit. They don't care about the well-being of workers at the bottom of the supply chain or that many are half-starving"

— Kalpona Akter

During the strikes and demonstrations, four factories and a bus were reportedly burned, while at least two workers have been killed during the strike.

On November 7, the Bangladesh government announced a new salary structure for protesting garment workers, raising the monthly minimum wage to ~US$113, to take effect December 1, 2023. The garment workers union heavily criticized this increase for being too small, announcing their intention to continue striking. Additionally they cited Bangladesh's 9.5% inflation which had worsened the ability for garment workers to make ends meet.

The strike is ongoing as of November 8, 2023.

== See also ==
- 2006 Dhaka strikes
- 2026 Bangladesh garment workers protests
