= Md. Iqbal =

Bangladeshi politician

Member of Bangladesh Parliament
- In office 1988–1991
- Preceded by: Rafiqul Islam Bakul
- Succeeded by: Abdus Sobhan

Personal details
- Born: 1948
- Died: 18 January 2005 (aged 56–57)
- Party: Jatiya Party (Ershad)

Md. Iqbal (1948 – 18 January 2005) was a Jatiya Party politician in Bangladesh and a former member of parliament for Pabna-5.

== Career ==
Iqbal was elected to parliament from Pabna-5 as a Jatiya Party candidate in 1988.
