= Mazhar Ali Qadri =

Bangladeshi politician

Mazhar Ali Quaderi
- মাজহার আলী কাদেরী

Member of Parliament from Pabna-5
- In office 2000–2001
- Preceded by: Rafiqul Islam Bakul
- Succeeded by: Abdus Sobhan

Personal details
- Born: Pabna District
- Party: Bangladesh Awami League

Mazhar Ali Quaderi, commonly known as M A Quaderi, was a Bangladesh Awami League politician. He was elected a member of parliament from Pabna-5 in a 2000 by-election.

== Career ==
Mazhar Ali Quaderi was the first vice chancellor of Bangabandhu Sheikh Mujib Medical University. He was the founding president of Swadhinata Chikitshak Parishad, a pro-AL organisation of doctors. Qadri was elected to parliament from Pabna-5 as a Bangladesh Awami League candidate in 2000 By-election.
