= Kalpona Akter =

Bangladeshi labor activist

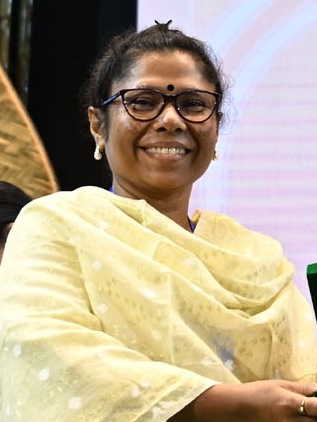
- Akter in Dhaka (2025)
- Born: 1976 (age 49–50); Chandpur, Bangladesh
- Occupation: Union organizer
- Organization: Bangladesh Center for Workers Solidarity
- Awards: 2016 Alison Des Forges Award for Extraordinary Activism

Kalpona Akter (born 1976) is a Bangladeshi labour activist. She is the founder and executive director of the Bangladesh Center for Workers Solidarity and was awarded Human Rights Watch's Alison Des Forges award for Extraordinary Activism in 2016.

== Career ==
Akter's family moved from Chandpur to Dhaka around 1982, where her father worked as general contractor. In 1988, her father suffered two strokes that left him partially paralysed. Akter, aged 12, left school and started work in a garment factory to support her family. In 1991 or 1992, she met her future husband at her workplace. They married in 1993.

In the same year, the management of Akter's factory announced the workers would not receive overtime pay during Eid al-Fitr. Of 1,500 workers, 93 including Akter decided to strike until the bonuses would be paid out again. After a single day of striking, the company agreed to pay out the bonus for that year, but twenty of the striking workers were fired during the Eid holiday. Through the AFL–CIO's Solidarity Center, they started working together with the newly founded Bangladesh Independent Garment Workers Union Federation (BIGUF). Akter attended Solidarity Center classes on labour law and rights.

Akter was fired from her job in 1995. Together with BIGUF, she fought the termination, but lost the court case. She also divorced her husband. Due to being blacklisted, she was fired from two more garment factory jobs. She then worked at BIGUF as full-time union organizer from 1997 until 1999, when she quit after becoming frustrated with the BIGUF's focus on garment workers.

In August 2000, Akter founded the Bangladesh Center for Workers Solidarity together with Babul Akhter and Nazma Sheikh. The new organisation was not a union, but an NGO promoting union rights. In 2003, she also helped to found the Bangladesh Garment and Industrial Workers Federation.

In 2010, Akter was charged with inciting a riot and conspiring to set off an explosive device after garment workers had vandalised several factories, even though she had been thirty-five kilometres away from the events. She temporarily went into hiding, but was eventually found and arrested by police. Other trade union leaders including Montu Ghosh of the Bangladesh Garment Workers Trade Union Centre and Babul Akhter were also arrested around that time, provoking international condemnation. Akter and Akhter were released on bail after thirty days in jail. The charges were dismissed after the US government had suspended its trade privileges with Bangladesh following the Rana Plaza disaster in 2013.

During a 2015 lecture tour in the US, Akter was detained together with other protesters as they were trying to deliver a protest letter to The Children's Place headquarters in Secaucus, New Jersey. She was released after two hours. The charges of trespassing were later dropped.

Akter was awarded Human Rights Watch's Alison Des Forges Award for Extraordinary Activism in 2016.
