= National Coordination Committee for Workers' Education =

National trade union centre of garment workers in Bangladesh

NCCWE
- National Coordination Committee for Workers' Education
- Location: Bangladesh
- Key people: Md. Anwar Hossain, Chairperson; Mesbahuddin Ahmed, Member Secretary
- Affiliations: ITUC, WFTU, ITF

The National Coordination Committee for Workers' Education (NCCWE) is a national trade union centre in Bangladesh. The centre unites 14 national trade union federations. It is affiliated with the International Trade Union Confederation, the World Federation of Trade Unions and the International Transport Workers' Federation. It is also supported by the International Labour Organization.

== Affiliated trade union federations ==
- Bangladesh Labour Federation
- Jatiyo Sramik League
- Bangladesh Trade Union Centre
- Mohila Sramik League
- Several more

== History ==
Following the Rana Plaza collapse in 2013, NCCWE joined the Rana Plaza Coordination Committee, which had been formed to oversee payments to affected workers and their families.

In 2016, NCCWE took part in a project through which workers who were killed by accidents on their workplaces would receive 50,000 taka ($630 as of 2016) in compensation.

In 2018, NCCWE together with the IndustriALL Bangladesh Council formed the Workers' Resource Centre, an NGO dedicated to supporting unions and workers in Bangladesh.
