= Golam Faruk Khandakar Prince =

Bangladeshi politician

Golam Faruk Prince
- গোলাম ফারুক প্রিন্স

Member of the Bangladesh Parliament for Pabna-5
- In office January 2009 – 6 August 2024
- Preceded by: Abdus Sobhan
- Succeeded by: Shamsur Rahman Simul Biswas

Personal details
- Born: 14 January 1969 (age 57) Shardiar, Shankharipara, Pabna Sadar, Pabna
- Party: Bangladesh Awami League

Golam Faruk Prince is a Bangladesh Awami League politician and a former member of Jatiya Sangsad representing the Pabna-5 constituency.

== Early life ==
Prince was born on 14 January 1969 at Krishnapur, Pabna. He has an M.S.S. and an LL.B. degree.

== Career ==
Prince was elected to the parliament from Pabna-5 in 2008 and reelected on 5 January 2014 as a Bangladesh Awami League candidate. In 2009, he accused the Rapid Action Battalion of taking over a sports stadium in Pabna and establishing a torture cell inside it. In November 2010, after Bangladesh Chhatra League activists broke into Pabna Government High School and stole entrance examination papers for government employees. The activists also damaged government vehicles and harassed the District Commissioner AFM Monjur Kadir. Prince blamed the DC and said the DC was not a "good person and does not work for me or the party". His comments were criticized by The Daily Star for not understanding how government works.

Prince is a member of the Parliamentary Standing Committee on the Ministry for Foreign Affairs. In 2018, he was nominated by the Bangladesh Awami League to contest the 11th parliamentary election.
