= Morium Akter =

General Secretary of the Bangladesh Independent Garment Workers Union Federation
- Incumbent
- Assumed office 2013

Vice President of the Bangladesh Textile and Garments Workers League

Morium Akter is the current general secretary of the Bangladesh Independent Garment Workers Union Federation (BIGUF), one of the largest trade union federations of garment workers in Bangladesh. She is also the vice president of the Bangladesh Textile and Garments Workers League.

== Career ==
Akter began working in a garment factory when she was nine years old. She first began organising colleagues when she was 14. In 2013, she was elected as BIGUF's general secretary.
