= Fazlul Haque Montu =

Bangladeshi politician and trade unionist (died 2020)

President of the Bangladesh Jatiya Sramik League
- In office 17 November 2019 – 20 November 2020
- President: Bangladesh Jatiya Sramik League, Bangladesh Institute of Labour Studies

Personal details
- Born: 17 March 1952 Pabna
- Died: 20 November 2020, aged 71 Dhaka
- Spouse: Halima Begum
- Children: Faisal Biswas Lenin (son), Farhana Haque (daughter)
- Known for: Freedom fighter, district commander Pabna, Member of Minimum Wage Board

Fazlul Haque Montu (died on November 20, 2020) was a Bangladeshi politician, Freedom Fighter and trade unionist.

== Biography ==
He was a member of the Awami League and president of its Pabna District unit. He was also involved in trade union politics for more than 45 years and in 2019 was elected president of the Awami League's trade union wing, the Jatiya Sramik League.

He participated in the liberation war as a freedom fighter.

He had formerly been an independent member of the Minimum Wage Board of Bangladesh's garment industry.

Montu died in Dhaka at the age of 71 due to complications brought on by COVID-19.
