= 2006 Dhaka strikes =

- Date: May 20, 2006 - June 6, 2006
- Location: Dhaka, Bangladesh

Parties
Garment workers	The Bangladesh Garment Manufacturers and Exporters Association (BGMEA)

Number
1.8 million	

From May 20 to June 6, nearly 1.8 million garment workers of Bangladesh concentrated in industrial areas in and around the capital Dhaka engaged in a series of simultaneous massive wildcat strikes. During this period, especially from May 20 to May 24 when garment workers' revolt was at its peak, workers of nearly 4000 factories went on strike. These workers, and other workers from the industrial suburbs, continuously demonstrated and blocked highways connecting industrial suburbs to the capital Dhaka and Dhaka to other cities – Mymensingh, Gazipur, Narayanganj, Ashulia, and Chittagong etc. In the face of this mass revolt, the government resorted to massive repression. In the first one-week, as per official figures, at least 3 workers were shot dead, 3000 injured and several thousands were put into prisons. Until June 6–7, workers in different Export Processing Zones (EPZ) and industrial areas continued to engage in wild cat strikes and demonstrations – most garment factories remained closed. The state proclaimed that factories will open only from June 8 once order is fully restored.

== See also ==
- Strike in Bangladesh
- 2023 Bangladesh garment workers strike
