= Central fund =

Central Fund or central fund may refer to:

- In government fund accounting, the main fund for tax and spending
  - Central Fund (Ireland)
  - Consolidated Fund, name in the UK and India
- A central bank fund
- Central Fund (Bangladesh), a Ministry of Labour and Employment fund providing financial support to workers
- Central Fund of Israel, American non-profit association which funding Israeli settlement projects in the West Bank

== See also ==
- Fund (disambiguation)
