= Department of Labour (Bangladesh) =

Bangladesh labor market regulator

- Formation: 1931
- Headquarters: Dhaka, Bangladesh
- Region served: Bangladesh
- Official language: Bengali
- Parent organization: Ministry of Labour and Employment
- Website: www.dol.gov.bd

Department of Labour (Bengali: শ্রম অধিদপ্তর) is a Bangladesh government regulatory agency under the Ministry of Labour and Employment responsible for regulating the labour market in Bangladesh. Goutom Kumar is the director general of the Department of Labour.

== History ==
Directorate of Labour was established in 1931 by the British Raj government and was upgraded in 1958 by the Government of Pakistan. The directorate was upgrade to a department in 2017.

The department has the authority to register unions in Bangladesh and its decisions can be challenged at the Labour Appellate Tribunal.
