= BGMEA University of Fashion & Technology =

University in Bangladesh

- বিজিএমইএ ইউনিভার্সিটি অব ফ্যাশন অ্যান্ড টেকনোলজি
- Other name: BUFT
- Motto: Excellence Through Education
- Type: Private, Research
- Established: 14 March 2012; 14 years ago
- Accreditation: Association of Commonwealth Universities; Institution of Textile Engineers and Technologists
- Affiliations: University Grants Commission (UGC)
- Chairman: Faruque Hassan
- Chancellor: President Hafiz Uddin Ahmad
- Vice-Chancellor: Dr. (Engr.) Ayub Nabi Khan
- Academic staff: 200+ 150+
- Students: 6000+
- Location: Nishatnagar, Turag, Dhaka,1711, Bangladesh; 23.8740°N 90.4000°E
- Campus: Urban, 1.66 acres (0.67 ha)
- Language: English, Bangla
- Colours
- Website: buft.edu.bd

BGMEA University of Fashion and Technology (BUFT) is a private university in Bangladesh.

== History ==
It was established by the Bangladesh Garment Manufacturers and Exporters Association (BGMEA) in 1999 as BGMEA Institute of Fashion & Technology (BIFT) which started functioning in 2000 and was affiliated to the National University, Bangladesh in 2001. BUFT, in collaboration with international organizations such as United Nations Industrial Development Organization (UNIDO), European Union (EU), German Technical Co-operation (GTZ), and the South Asia Enterprise Development fund (SEDF), is working for further growth and development of the garments manufacturing industry in the country.

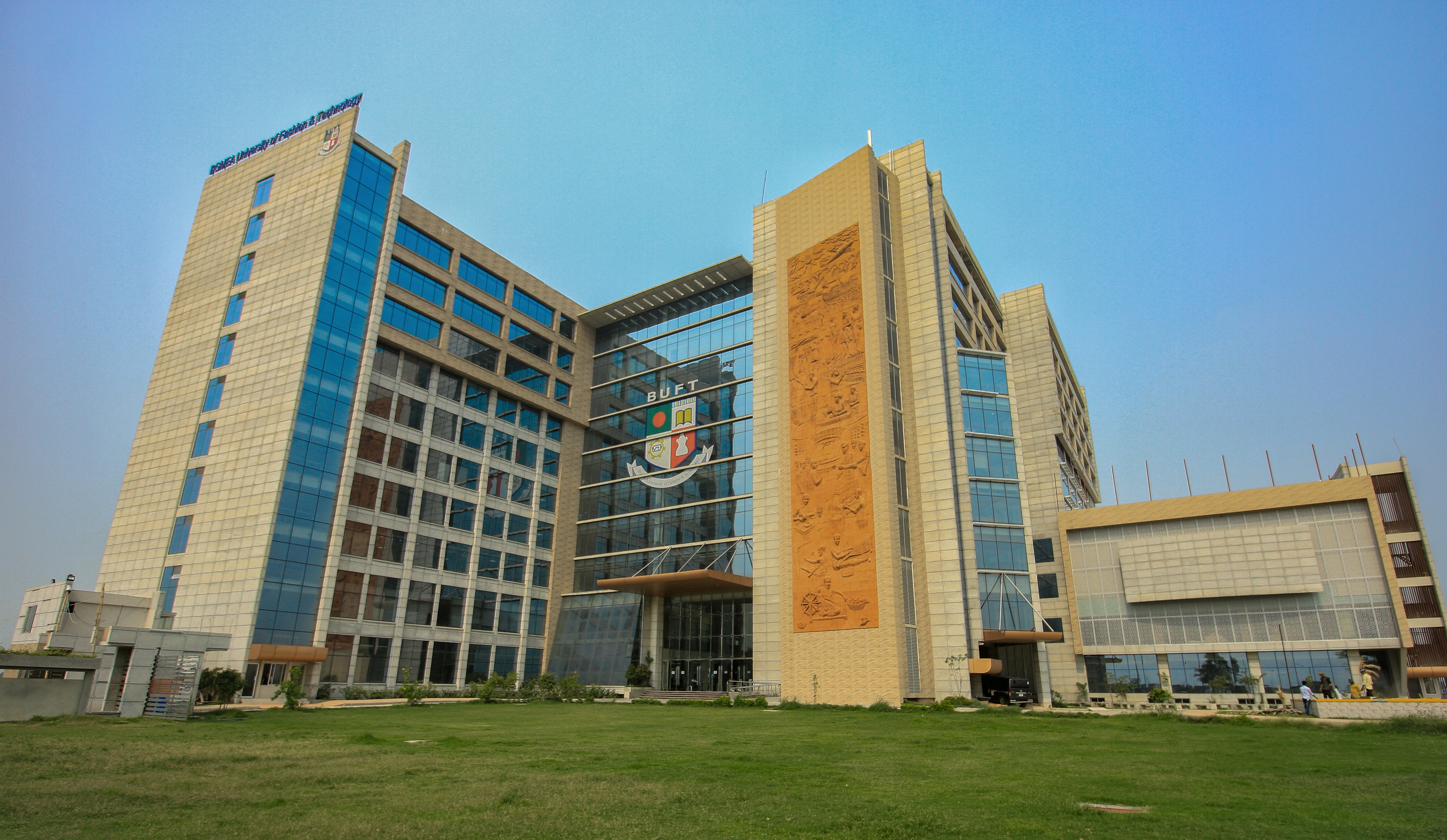

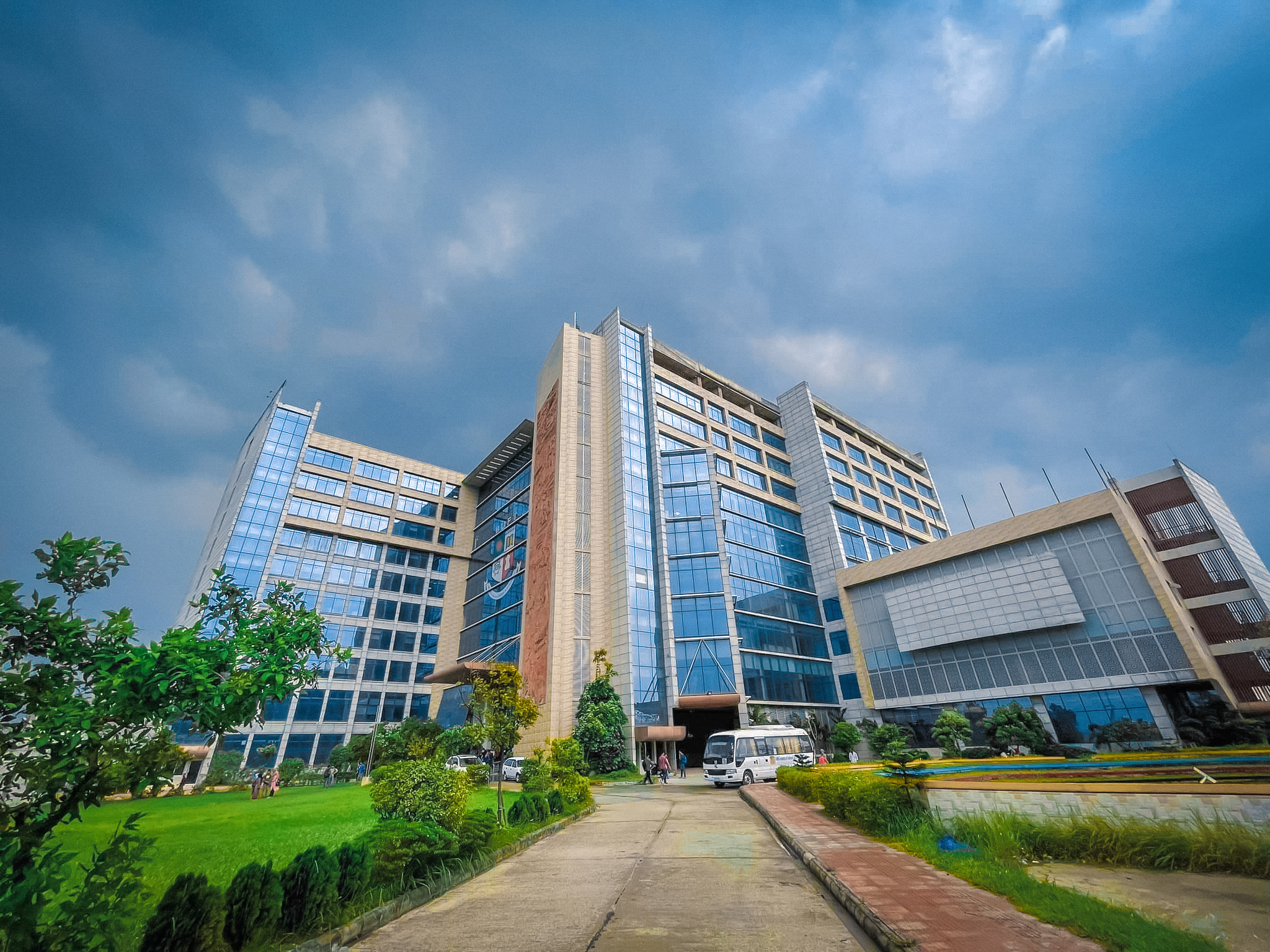

== Vice-Chancellor ==
- Dr. (Engr.) Ayub Nabi Khan (acting) (1 January 2025 – 31 January 2026)
- Dr. (Engr.) Ayub Nabi Khan (1 February 2026 – present)

== International cooperation ==
An agreement of cooperation was signed with China's Wuhan Textile University to develop a joint undergraduate major for fashion design.

On 30 August 2015, BUFT and Goethe-Institut in Bangladesh signed a Memorandum of Understanding (MoU). This MoU is a framework of mutual interest in the fields of educational and academic exchanges, joint fashion competitions, research, internships, and academic transfer agreements and will encourage international cultural exchanges between BUFT and Goethe-Institut. Under the MoU, both parties will host local and international fashion workshops and exhibitions for German and Bangladeshi students.

A MoU has been signed between BUFT and Sweden's University of Boras with the opportunity of joint research including student exchange.

== Convocations ==
The first convocation of the University was held in 2022 at the International Convention City Bashundhara (ICCB). The Second Convocation of the University was held in 2025 at the Bangladesh-China Friendship Exhibition Center (BCFEC). This year, a total of 2731 graduates are receiving their degrees. Undergraduate Programs: 2403 graduates Graduate Programs: 328 graduates.

== See also ==
- Textile schools in Bangladesh
