= Joly Talukder =

Bangladeshi politician and trade union leader

- জলি তালুকদার
- Talukder in 2026

Member of the Presidium of the Communist Party of Bangladesh
- Incumbent
- Assumed office September 2025

Vice President of the Garment Workers Trade Union Centre

General Secretary of the Garment Workers Trade Union Centre
- Incumbent
- Assumed office 2017

Personal details
- Born: 16 November 1976 (age 50) Netrokona, Bangladesh
- Party: Communist Party of Bangladesh
- Occupation: Politician, Trade Unionist, Writer

Joly Talukder (also spelled Talukdar or Jolly Talukder; Bengali: জলি তালুকদার; born 16 November 1976) is a Bangladeshi politician and trade union leader. She is a member of the Presidium of the Communist Party of Bangladesh (CPB) and a vice president of the Garment Workers Trade Union Centre (GWTUC). In 2017 she became the first woman elected general secretary of GWTUC.

== Early life and education ==
Talukder was born on 16 November 1976 in Netrokona District, Bangladesh. Party and publisher biographies describe her as being from Mallikpur village in Mohanganj (Dingapota haor area) and as holding a bachelor's degree in mathematics; she was active in Chhatra Union student politics in Mymensingh before becoming a full-time garment workers' organiser.

== Trade union career ==
From 28 July 2014, Talukder took part in a hunger strike by about 1,600 Tuba Group garment workers in Badda Thana, Dhaka, who had occupied their factory over unpaid wages. When police dispersed the protest on 7 August using tear gas and rubber bullets, they detained Talukder together with Mushrefa Mishu, leader of the Garment Workers Unity Forum; both were released the same day.

Talukder was elected general secretary of GWTUC in 2017 at the centre's 7th national conference; Montu Ghosh was elected president. She was the union's first female general secretary. By the mid-2020s she was identified in international reporting as a vice president of GWTUC.

In April 2018, Talukder and other GWTUC leaders were arrested on charges filed by the Bangladesh Garment Manufacturers and Exporters Association (BGMEA). She was held in solitary confinement. The arrests drew domestic and international protest, including from the Clean Clothes Campaign and the German union ver.di. The detained leaders were released on interim bail on 5 April 2018.

In November 2019 she met WFTU general secretary George Mavrikos in Athens in connection with textile and garment union work.

== Political career ==
Talukder stood as the CPB candidate in Netrokona-4 in the 2018 Bangladeshi general election. During the campaign she and supporters were reportedly attacked; she alleged obstruction by activists linked to the Awami League candidate.

She again contested Netrokona-4 for the CPB in the 2026 general election and received 3,359 votes.

After the CPB's 13th congress in September 2025, she was listed among the members of the party Presidium elected by the central committee.

== Writings ==
Talukder is the author of the Bengali essay collection নারীমুক্তির রাজনৈতিক সংগ্রাম (Nari Muktir Rajnaitik Sangram; [Political struggle for women's liberation]), listed by Dyu Prakashan (ISBN 978-984-741-018-0).
