= Department of Inspection for Factories and Establishments =

Bangladesh labor inspection agency

- Formation: 1969
- Headquarters: Dhaka, Bangladesh
- Region served: Bangladesh
- Official language: Bengali
- Parent organization: Ministry of Labour and Employment
- Website: Department of Inspection for Factories and Establishments

Department of Inspection for Factories and Establishments (DIFE) is an autonomous government agency responsible for health and safety inspection in factories and industries in Bangladesh with its Inspection units RMG Sustainability Council (RSC) and Remediation Coordination Cell (RCC) and is located in Dhaka, Bangladesh. It also provides factories with information and training regarding workers safety and the enforcement of labour laws in Bangladesh.

== History ==
Department of Inspection for Factories and Establishments was established on 1969 by the government of Pakistan on the recommendations of Air Vice Marshal Malik Nur Khan as the Directorate of Inspection for Factories and Establishments. After the Independence of Bangladesh in 1971 the Directorate was placed under the Ministry of Labour and Employment. On 15 January 2014 the Ministry of Labour and Employment upgraded the Directorate of Inspection for Factories and Establishments into the Department of Inspection for Factories and Establishments.
