= Rafiqul Islam Bakul =

Bangladeshi politician

- রফিকুল ইসলাম বকুল

Member of the Bangladesh Parliament for Pabna-5
- In office 1986–1988
- Preceded by: M. A. Matin
- Succeeded by: Md. Iqbal
- In office February 1996 – 2000
- Preceded by: Abdus Sobhan
- Succeeded by: Mazhar Ali Qadri

Personal details
- Born: Pabna District
- Died: 10 November 2000 Sirajganj District
- Party: Bangladesh Nationalist Party
- Other political affiliations: Bangladesh Awami League

Rafiqul Islam Bakul Bangladesh Nationalist Party politician. He was elected a member of parliament for Pabna-5 in 1986, February 1996 and June 1996. He was an organizer of the Liberation War of Bangladesh.

== Career ==
Bakul was the first person to fly the flag of Independent Bangladesh in Pabna District.

Rafiqul Islam Bakul was elected to parliament from Pabna-5 as a Bangladesh Awami League candidate in 1986 election. He was elected a member of parliament for Pabna-5 as a Bangladesh Nationalist Party candidate in February 1996 and June 1996 election.

== Death and legacy ==
Rafiqul Islam Bakul died in a road accident at Konabari in Sirajganj on 10 November 2000.

After the fall of the Sheikh Hasina led Awami League government, the Muhammad Yunus led interim government renamed Rafiqul Islam Bakul Swimming Pool to Pabna District Swimming Pool in May 2025.
