= Pabna-5 =

Constituency of Bangladesh's Jatiya Sangsad

Coordinates: 24.0°N 89.23°E

- Constituency for the Jatiya Sangsad
- District: Pabna District
- Division: Rajshahi Division
- Electorate: 435,902 (2018)

Current constituency
- Created: 1973
- Party: Bangladesh Nationalist Party
- Member: Shamsur Rahman Simul Biswas
- ← 71 Pabna-4 73 Meherpur-1 →

Pabna-5 is a constituency represented in the Jatiya Sangsad (National Parliament) of Bangladesh since 2026 by Shamsur Rahman Simul Biswas of the Bangladesh Nationalist Party.

== Boundaries ==
The constituency encompasses Pabna Sadar Upazila.

== History ==
The constituency was created for the first general elections in newly independent Bangladesh, held in 1973.

== Members of Parliament ==
Election	Member	Party
1973	Abdul Momin Talukder	Awami League
1979	M. A. Matin	Bangladesh Muslim League
Major Boundary Changes
1986	Rafiqul Islam Bakul	Awami League
1988	Md. Iqbal	Independent
1991	Abdus Sobhan	Bangladesh Jamaat-e-Islami
1996	Rafiqul Islam Bakul	Bangladesh Nationalist Party
2000 by-election	Mazhar Ali Qadri	Awami League
2001	Abdus Sobhan	Bangladesh Jamaat-e-Islami
2008	Golam Faruk Khandakar Prince	Awami League
2014	Golam Faruk Khandaker Prince	Awami League
2018	Golam Faruk Khandaker Prince	Awami League
2024	Golam Faruk Khandaker Prince	Awami League
2026	Shamsur Rahman Shimul Biswas	Bangladesh Nationalist Party

== Elections ==
=== Elections in the 2010s ===
Golam Faruk Khandakar Prince was re-elected unopposed in the 2014 general election after opposition parties withdrew their candidacies in a boycott of the election.

=== Elections in the 2000s ===
General Election 2008: Pabna-5
Party	Candidate	Votes	%	±%
AL	Golam Faruk Khandakar Prince	161,413	52.9	+11.8
Jamaat	Abdus Sobhan	141,663	46.4	−10.4
IAB	Arif Billah	1,947	0.6	N/A
Majority		19,750	6.5	−9.1
Turnout		305,023	87.7	+12.9
AL gain from Jamaat				

General Election 2001: Pabna-5
Party	Candidate	Votes	%	±%
Jamaat	Abdus Sobhan	142,884	56.8	+37.2
AL	Md. Wazi Uddin Khan	103,499	41.1	+4.8
IJOF	Md. Azizur Rahman Arzu	4,175	1.7	N/A
Independent	Ashraful Alam Chowdhury	448	0.2	N/A
Gano Forum	Ranesh Moitra	396	0.2	N/A
BKSMA (Sadeq)	Md. Akkas Ali Khan	264	0.1	N/A
Majority		39,385	15.6	+10.8
Turnout		251,666	74.8	−3.1
Jamaat gain from BNP				

=== Elections in the 1990s ===
Rafiqul Islam Bakul died in November 2000. Mazhar Ali Qadri of the Awami League was elected in a by-election.

General Election June 1996: Pabna-5
Party	Candidate	Votes	%	±%
BNP	Rafiqul Islam Bakul	78,165	41.1	N/A
AL	A. K. Khandker	69,119	36.3	+5.9
Jamaat	Abdus Sobhan	37,336	19.6	−27.7
JP(E)	Md. Iqbal	4,377	2.3	+1.5
Zaker Party	Taslim Hasan Suman	659	0.3	+0.1
NAP (Bhashani)	Amzad Hossain	423	0.2	N/A
FP	Md. Aminul Islam Talukdar	85	0.0	−0.1
Majority		9,046	4.8	−12.1
Turnout		190,164	77.9	+18.1
BNP gain from Jamaat				

General Election 1991: Pabna-5
Party	Candidate	Votes	%	±%
Jamaat	Abdus Sobhan	75,586	47.3	
AL	Rafiqul Islam Bakul	48,559	30.4	
BNP	Abul Hasnat	23,734	14.9	
UCL	Md. Aminul Haq	9,073	5.7	
JP(E)	Md. Shawkat Ali	1,280	0.8	
Jatiya Samajtantrik Dal-JSD	Md. Shahjahan Bishwas	557	0.3	
Zaker Party	Taslim Hasan Suman	351	0.2	
Bangladesh Muslim League (Yusuf)	Md. Abdul Kuddus	305	0.2	
FP	Md. Hasan Ali	168	0.1	
Dhumpan O MAdokdrobba Nibaronkari Manabsheba Schansta	Md. Sheikh Abdul Aziz	138	0.1	
Majority		27,027	16.9	
Turnout		159,751	59.8	
Jamaat gain from JP(E)				
