= Mushrefa Mishu =

Bangladeshi trade unionist and politician

President of the Garment Workers Unity Forum

General Secretary of the Democratic Revolutionary Party

Personal details
- Party: Democratic Revolutionary Party

Mushrefa Mishu (Bengali: মোশরেফা মিশু) is a Bangladeshi trade unionist and politician. She is the current president of the Garment Workers Unity Forum and general secretary of Bangladesh's Democratic Revolutionary Party (Bengali: গণতান্ত্রিক বিপ্লবী দল), a leading member of the Democratic United Front and Left Democratic Alliance.

== Career ==
Mishu was a student leader before becoming a trade unionist.

In 2010, Gazipur police arrested Mishu together with three other persons while on their way to a rally of the Garment Workers Unity Forum. She was detained for more than four months and afterwards suffered health problems due to police maltreatment.

In 2013, Mishu opposed demands by Hefazat-e-Islam Bangladesh that women should not interact with men in public.

From July 28, 2014, Mishu took part in a hunger strike of 1,600 Tuba Group garment workers in Badda Thana, who had occupied their factory in protest against the repeated non-payment of wages by the factory owner. When police dispersed the protest on August 7 using tear gas and rubber bullets, they detained Mishu together with Joly Talukder, leader of the Bangladesh Garment Workers Trade Union Centre. Both were released on the same day. Police detained Mishu for several hours on August 19. On December 14 of that year, police detained Mishu following a protest demanding an increase in minimum wage for garment workers. She was accused of having "ransacked" a garment company's office. Amnesty International condemned her arrest and the death of four people during the protests.

On July 13, 2015, police kept Mishu from leaving her Dhaka home to attend a protest against unpaid wages. On December 21, 2016, Mishu was detained by the Detective Branch of Dhaka Metropolitan Police. She was released on the same day, on the condition that she would "refrain from further protests".
