= Sramik Karmachari Oikya Parishad =

National Federation in Bangladesh

- Formation: 1983
- Headquarters: Dhaka, Bangladesh
- Region served: Bangladesh
- Official language: Bengali

Sramik Karmachari Oikya Parishad (Bengali: শ্রমিক কর্মচারী ঐক্য পরিষদ; United Front of Workers and Employees) is a national federation of 16 unions in Bangladesh, which collectively represent 90 percent of the unionized labor force in Bangladesh.

== History ==
Sramik Karmachari Oikya Parishad was established on 13 April 1983 by 12 national unions in Bangladesh. This traces to a meeting of 5 unions in Bangladesh in 1982, when union activities where banned under martial law in Bangladesh, that sought to restore workers rights to unionize. The number of participating unions increased to 11 by the end of 1982. The Bangladesh Jatiyatabadi Sramik Dal, aligned with Bangladesh Nationalist Party, joined in 1983 and they collectively formed the Sramik Karmachari Oikya Parishad. The formation was announced at the Jatiya Press Club. They declared a 5-point demand to the Chief Martial Law Administrator of the Government of Bangladesh concerning labour rights. In 1983, Jatiya Sramik League, aligned with Bangladesh Awami League, joined the Sramik Karmachari Oikya Parishad.

The military regime led by General Hussain Muhammad Ershad initially tried to ignore demands. Smaller unions in Bangladesh started to follow the Sramik Karmachari Oikya Parishad. The Minister of Industry, Golam Mostafa and Minister of Labor, Aminul Islam, met with representatives of the Sramik Karmachari Oikya Parishad. The government facing the threat of national strike signed an agreement with the Sramik Karmachari Oikya Parishad to increase the rights of workers on 21 May 1984. The parishad went on strikes to ensure the government implemented the agreement. In 1984, Kazi Zafar Ahmed of Bangla Sramik Federation and Sirajul Hossain Khan of Bangladesh Workers Federation joined Jatiya Party (Ershad) led by Hussain Muhammad Ershad and were appointed government ministers. Their respective organization left the Sramik Karmachari Oikya Parishad following. Tajul Islam of the parishad was killed by the Bangladesh Police while participating in the strike.

In 1986, Ruhul Amin Bhuiyan of the Jatiya Sramik Jote and Shah Mohammad Abu Zafar of the Jatiya Sramik League joined the Jatiya Party, which further weakened the parishad. In the 1990s, the Sramik Karmachari Oikya Parishad signed a number of agreements with the government of Bangladesh for improving labor conditions and carried out a number of strikes to force the government to implement those strikes. Beyond labour issues, the organization has campaigned for greater rights for religious minorities.
