= BGMEA Complex =

Building in Bangladesh

- বিজিএমইএ কমপ্লেক্স
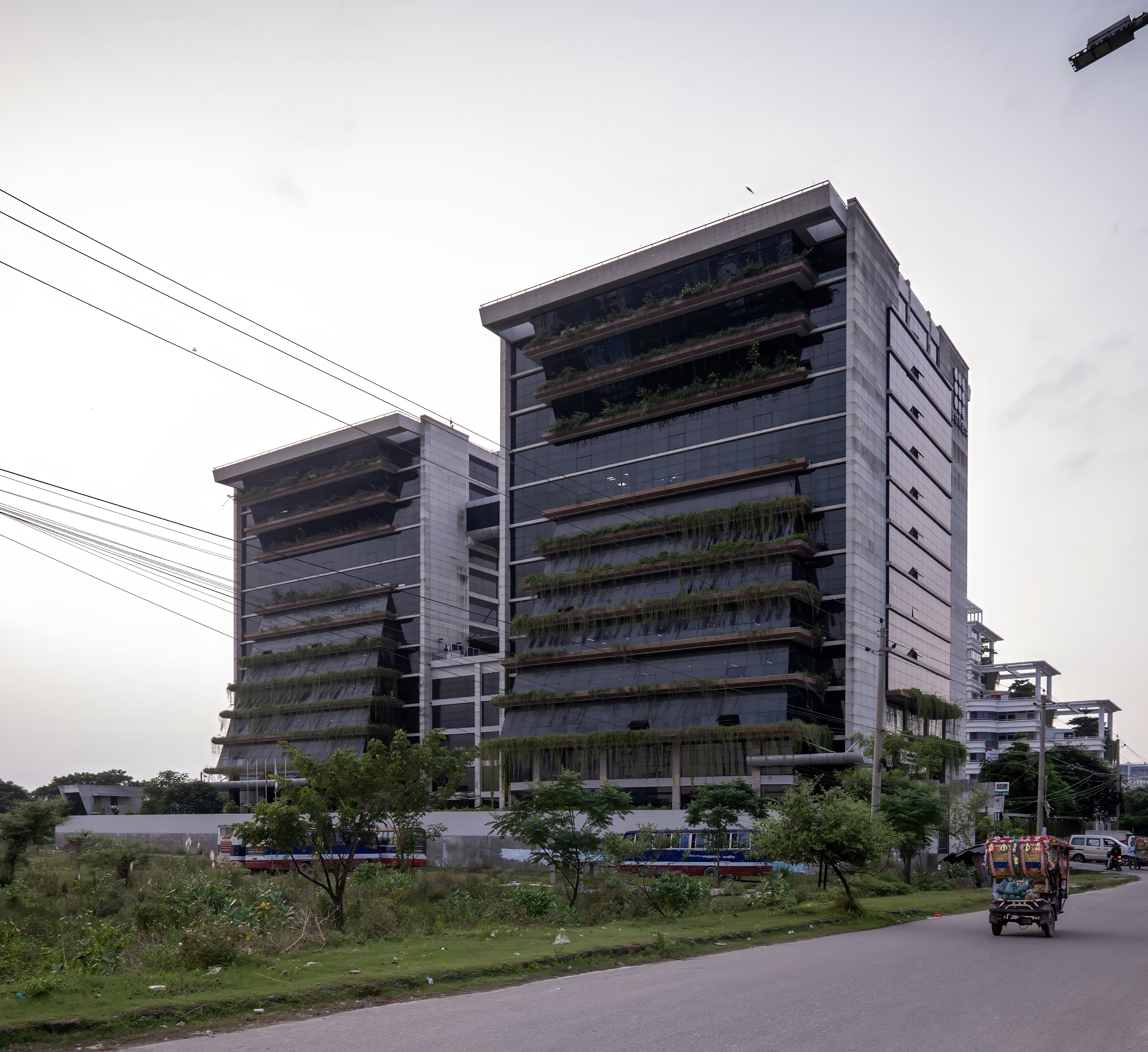
- BGMEA Complex in 2024
- Interactive map of the BGMEA Complex area
- Former names: BGMEA Bhaban

General information
- Status: Completed
- Type: Twin-tower
- Location: Avenue 6, Sector 17, Uttara, Dhaka, Bangladesh
- Coordinates: 23.848194°N 90.370774°E
- Inaugurated: 2019
- Owner: BGMEA
- Landlord: RAJUK

Height
- Top floor: club, swimming pool, seminar room

Technical details
- Floor count: 13

Other information
- Parking: Yes
- Public transit: Uttara South

BGMEA Complex is an office building that served as the headquarters of Bangladesh Garment Manufacturers and Exporters Association and is located in Uttara, Dhaka.

== Previous location ==
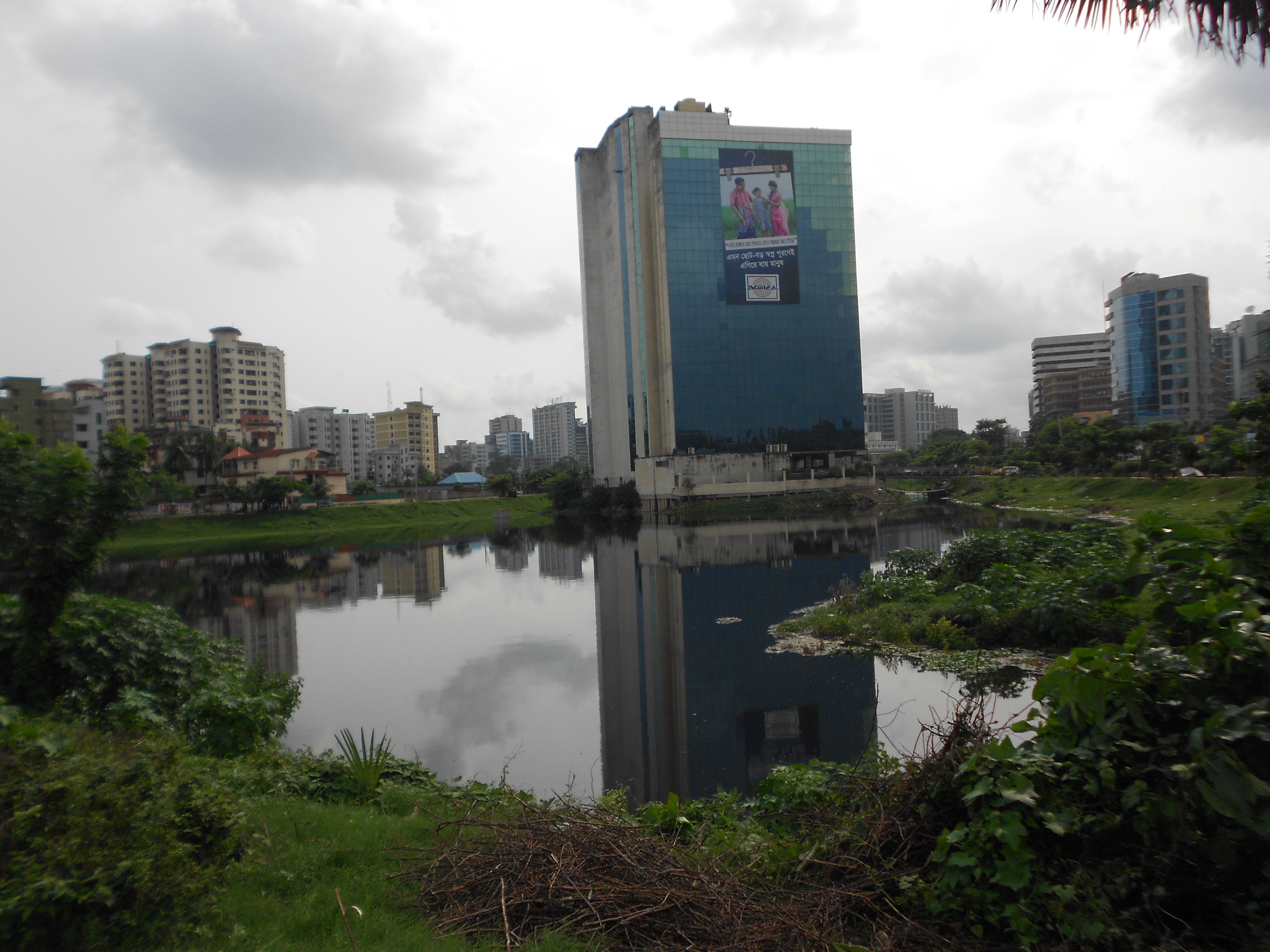
The old BGMEA Bhaban in Hatirjheel

The foundation of the previous headquarters was placed in 1998 by then Prime Minister Sheikh Hasina. In 2006 it was inaugurated by then Prime Minister Khaleda Zia. Sheikh Hasina claimed that the first Hasina ministry allocated site near Pan Pacific Sonargaon for the headquarters. But the building was built illegally on canal land in Hatirjheel. In 2011 Bangladesh High Court ordered the building to be demolished. The High Court in its verdict declared ”The BGMEA Bhaban is like a cancer in the Hatirjheel project and if the building is not taken down immediately, it will infect not just Hatirjheel, but the entire city of Dhaka”. A four-member bench of the Appellate Division of the Supreme Court of Bangladesh led by chief justice Surendra Kumar Sinha upheld the verdict of the High Court in 2016. It was sealed off by the RAJUK in 2019. The demolition was started in 2020.

== Shift to the new building ==
In 2017, the court gave six months to demolish the building. It was known that officials of the BGMEA preferred Uttara as the new site for their headquarters as it is near to the Hazrat Shahjalal International Airport. In 3 April 2019, the new headquarters in Uttara was inaugurated by Sheikh Hasina. BGMEA's new headquarters shifted to two high-rise buildings due to the old building being sealed. The total area of these two buildings is 0.464 million square feet. BGMEA will use 0.3 million square feet in this work. In addition to the exhibition center, there is a 750-capacity auditorium, two seminars, and swimming pools for the members of the Bangladesh Garment Manufacturers and Exporters Association. A new five-storey building was built and the organisation started the process to vacate the old building. It was planned to upgrade the headquarters into 13-storey. However, according to the new members of BGMEA, as the Exim Bank didn’t start their operation to the new building yet, it is not possible to function there. In 2021, it was requested ABM Amin Ullah Nuri, who was the chairman of RAJUK that time, to develop repair roads to the complex and build a culvert that would improve the headquarters transport. In 2022, Textile Technology Business Center was inaugurated at the headquarters. In 2024, a digital plenary was established at the complex named after Subid Ali, the first BGMEA president.
