= Child Labour Unit =

Bangladeshi government department

- Formation: 2009
- Headquarters: Dhaka, Bangladesh
- Region served: Bangladesh
- Official language: Bengali
- Parent organization: Ministry of Labour and Employment
- Website: Child Labour Unit

Child Labour Unit (Bengali: শিশু শ্রমিক ইউনিট) is an agency of the Bangladesh government under the Ministry of Labour and Employment responsible for eliminating child labour in Bangladesh.

== History ==
The Child Labour Unit was established in 2009 under the Ministry of Labour and Employment to eliminate child labour in Bangladesh. This was in accordance with the Convention on the Rights of the Child signed in 1990 and the National Child Policy 2011 policy of the government of Bangladesh. While this was meant to be a temporary organisation, the government of Bangladesh moved to make it a permanent office under the Ministry of Labour and Employment.
