= Shamsur Rahman Simul Biswas =

Bangladeshi politician

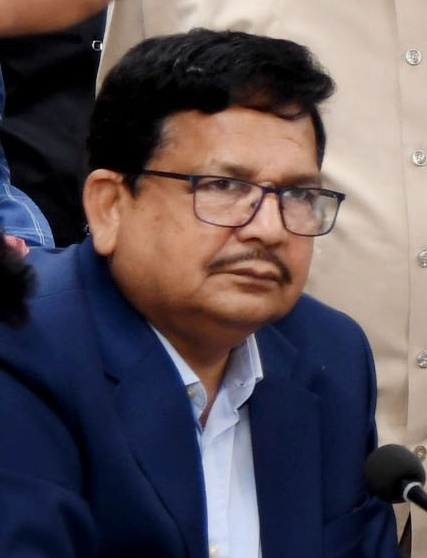
- Simul Biswas in 2026

Member of Parliament for Pabna-5
- Incumbent
- Assumed office 17 February 2026
- Preceded by: Golam Faruk Khandakar Prince

Member Secretary of Bangladesh Jatiotabadi Sramik Dal
- In office 21 November 2026

Personal details
- Party: Bangladesh Nationalist Party
- Children: Tanvir Rahman Mithun Biswas, MD Sad Foysal Rahman
- Occupation: Politician, Lawyer
- Website: shimulbiswas.com

Shamsur Rahman Simul Biswas is a Bangladeshi politician and lawyer. He is an elected Member of Parliament from the Pabna-5 constituency. On 21 November 2026, he was appointed as the Member Secretary of the Central Executive Committee of the Bangladesh Jatiotabadi Sramik Dal. Rahman was arrested on February 8, 2018, base on the Zia Orphanage Trust graft case and released after 14 months.
