= Bangladesh Jatiotabadi Sramik Dal =

Trade union federation affiliated with the Bangladesh Nationalist Party

- বাংলাদেশ জাতীয়তাবাদী শ্রমিক দল
- Logo of Sramik Dal

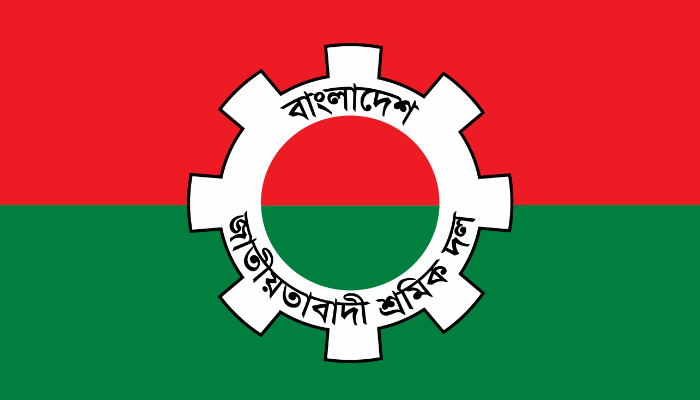
- Party flag
- Headquarters: 28/1, Naya Paltan, VIP Road, Dhaka
- Region served: Bangladesh
- Members: 180,000
- Official language: Bengali
- Convener: Amanullah Aman
- Member Secretary: Shamsur Rahman Simul Biswas
- Parent organization: Bangladesh Nationalist Party
- Affiliations: International Trade Union Confederation

The Bangladesh Jatiotabadi Sramik Dal (Bengali: বাংলাদেশ জাতীয়তাবাদী শ্রমিক দল, lit. 'Bangladesh Nationalist Labour Party') is a national trade union federation in Bangladesh, which is affiliated with the Bangladesh Nationalist Party. It is also affiliated with the International Trade Union Confederation.

== History ==
Bangladesh Jatyatabadi Sramik Dal was founded in 1979 as an affiliate of the Bangladesh Nationalist Party with Nazrul Islam Khan as its general secretary.

It organized a memorial event for Ziaur Rahman, founder president of Bangladesh Nationalist Party, at the WAPDA auditorium in January 2003. On 14 June 2003, a Chittagong unit activist of Bangladesh Jatyatabadi Sramik Dal was shot dead in Chittagong; two people were sentenced to death and one, a former FIFA referee, to life sentence. Akbar Hossain, Minister of Shipping, spoke at a rally organized by Jatyatabadi Sramik Dal in Chittagong Port and chaired by the president of the port unit, Shamsul Alam on 31 August 2003. Nazrul Islam Khan became president of Bangladesh Jatyatabadi Sramik Dal in 2003 and was made ambassador of Bangladesh to Kuwait in 2004. In November 2003, Jatyatabadi Sramik Dal attacked an event of 11 left wing political parties in Narayanganj District. President of the Poura Rickshaw Sramik Dal was killed in custody during Operation Clean Heart in Bogra District.

In May 2004, an activist of Bangladesh Jatyatabadi Sramik Dal was caught while extorting money in Barisal by the general public and handed over to the police who released him soon after.

On 24 August 2004, Bangladesh Jatyatabadi Sramik Dal activists and Bangladesh police attacked an Awami League rally together. They also assaulted journalists who were documenting their attack. The Awami League was protesting the 2004 Dhaka grenade attack targeting Sheikh Hasina and had vandalized the Gulistan area. Jatyatabadi Sramik Dal also tried to stop the funeral prayers of Ivy Rahman in Khulna who was killed in the grenade attack. Purba Banglar Communist Party assassinated a leader of Bangladesh Jatyatabadi Sramik Dal in Bagerhat District on 19 March 2004.

Bangladesh Jatyatabadi Sramik Dal activist was arrested with bombs from Bagerhat District on 1 February 2005.

In August 2006, Sramik Karmachari Oikya Parishad suspended ties with Bangladesh Jatyatabadi Sramik Dal after it had withdrawn from a strike called by the Sramik Karmachari Oikya Parishad. Nurullah Bahar, leader of collective bargaining agent at Chittagong Port and Bangladesh Jatyatabadi Sramik Dal, protested a report by Transparency International Bangladesh which alleged irregularities at the port.

In 2005 and 2006, M Zafrul Hasan was the general secretary of Bangladesh Jatyatabadi Sramik Dal. Hassan was also the Collective Bargaining Agent of Bangladesh Power Development Board. Hasan was a member of Bangladesh Minimum Wage Board led by Chairman Anwarul Haque. Abul Kashem Chowdhury was President of the Bangladesh Jatyatabadi Sramik Dal in 2005. On 29 October 2006, Awami League activist attacked Bangladesh Jatyatabadi Sramik Dal office in Patuakhali District during countrywide protests. Five including a police officer was injured in fighting between different fractions of Bangladesh Jatyatabadi Sramik Dal.

Bangladesh Jatiyatabadi Railway Sramik Karmachari Dal, a unit of Bangladesh Jatyatabadi Sramik Dal, illegally occupied Bangladesh railway warehouse in Tejgaon in January 2007. Anwar Hossain urged Bangladesh Garments Manufacturers and Exporters Association to allow unions in all garment factories of Bangladesh. In March 2007, joint forces arrested Abul Kashem Chowdhury, a leader of Bangladesh Jatyatabadi Sramik Dal.

In October 2008, Bangladesh Election Commission ordered Bangladesh Nationalist Party to remove Bangladesh Jatyatabadi Sramik Dal and Bangladesh Jatiyatabadi Chhatra Dal from affiliate status. Rresident of Bangladesh Jatyatabadi Sramik Dal, Nazrul Islam Khan, and General secretary of Jatiya Sramik League, Roy Ramesh Chandra, appealed to Kuwait Trade Union Federation to look after the interests of Bangladeshi workers in Kuwait in August 2008.

In March 2009, Bangladesh Jatyatabadi Sramik Dal and Jatiya Sramik League wrote a joint letter to G Rajasekaran, President of Malaysia Trades Union Congress, to look into the cancellation of 55 thousand visa of Bangladeshi workers.

In February 2010, BM Bakir Hossain, president of Bangladesh Banks Employees Federation and joint secretary of Bangladesh Jatyatabadi Sramik Dal, died in Dhaka Medical College Hospital under the custody of Bangladesh Police. Hossain was a member of the executive committee of Bangladesh Nationalist Party which demanded a judicial investigation of his death. Former Prime Minister Khaleda Zia blamed the government for his death.

In June 2011, Bangladesh Jatyatabadi Sramik Dal burned down a bus that carried them from Gazipur to Dhaka during a general strike.

President Abul Kashem Chowdhury and General Secretary Muhammad Jafrul Hasan of the Bangladesh Jatyatabadi Sramik Dal expressed concern over the enforced disappearance of M Ilias Ali and his chauffeur in 2012.

Four Bangladesh Jatyatabadi Sramik Dal activists were injured due to infight in front of the office of the chairperson of Bangladesh Nationalist Party on 18 April 2013.

The seventh national council of Bangladesh Jatyatabadi Sramik Dal was held in Institution of Engineers, Bangladesh in 2014 and was attended by former Prime Minister Khaleda Zia.

Anwar Hossain was the President of Bangladesh Jatyatabadi Sramik Dal in 2016. Anwar Hossain is the vice-chairman of Bangladesh Institute of Labour Studies.

The Bangladesh Jatyatabadi Sramik Dal was working with an expired executive committee in 2021, whose term had ended years ago.

In August 2022, Bangladesh Nationalist Party leader son of Sadek Hossain Khoka, Ishraque Hossain, was arrested while he was distributing leaflets against the government with activists of Bangladesh Jatyatabadi Sramik Dal.
