= Central Fund (Bangladesh) =

Government fund for support for workers

- Formation: 2015
- Headquarters: Dhaka, Bangladesh
- Region served: Bangladesh
- Official language: Bengali
- Parent organization: Ministry of Labour and Employment
- Website: centralfund.gov.bd

Central Fund (Bengali: কেন্দ্রীয় তহবিল) is a Bangladesh government fund under the Ministry of Labour and Employment that is responsible for providing financial support to workers. The fund is chaired by the minister of labour and employment.

== History ==
Central Fund was established in 2015 by the government of Bangladesh according to the labor act passed by the parliament in 2013. The purpose of the fund is to help industrial workers in Bangladesh and is jointly funded by the government and private industry. In August 2017, Prime Minister Sheikh Hasina instructed the Ministry of Commerce to bring all industries and factories under the central fund.
