= Ministry of Labour and Employment (Bangladesh) =

Government ministry of Bangladesh

- শ্রম ও কর্মসংস্থান মন্ত্রণালয়
- Government Seal of Bangladesh

Ministry overview
- Formed: 20 January 1972; 54 years ago
- Jurisdiction: Government of Bangladesh
- Headquarters: Bangladesh Secretariat, Dhaka
- Annual budget: ৳467 crore (US$38 million) (2026-2027)
- Minister responsible: Ariful Haque Choudhury
- Child agencies: Department of Inspection for Factories and Establishments; Child Labour Unit; Minimum Wage Board; Department of Labour; Labour Appellate Tribunal; Central Fund
- Website: mole.gov.bd

The Ministry of Labour and Employment (Bengali: শ্রম ও কর্মসংস্থান মন্ত্রণালয়; Śrama ō karmasansthāna mantraṇālaẏa) is the government ministry of Bangladesh responsible for employment, to protect and safeguard the interest of workers and human resource development.

== Target 2030 ==
The government of Bangladesh has set an ambitious target of generating 30 million new job opportunities by the year 2030. In its endeavor to improve labor conditions and expand employment opportunities, the Government of Bangladesh has undertaken significant initiatives to establish a specialized entity known as the "Directorate of Employment."

== Directorates ==
- Department of Inspection for Factories and Establishments
- Child Labour Unit
- Minimum Wage Board
- Department of Labour
- Labour Appellate Tribunal
- Bangladesh Labour Welfare Foundation
- Central Fund (Bangladesh)
