= Labour Appellate Tribunal =

Bangladesh labor appeals court

- Formation: 1972
- Headquarters: Dhaka, Bangladesh
- Region served: Bangladesh
- Official language: Bengali
- Parent organization: Ministry of Labor and Employment
- Website: lat.portal.gov.bd

The Labour Appellate Tribunal is a specialized court that is responsible for hearing appeals against verdicts of labour courts in Bangladesh. The tribunal must dispose of cases within 180 days. All decisions of the tribunal can be appealed at the High Court Division. The tribunal is a regulatory body under the Ministry of Labor and Employment.

There are 13 labour courts in Bangladesh. As of April 2024, there were 23,571 pending cases with the labour courts and the Labour Appellate Tribunal. Since March 2024, it had been operating without a chairman. The court was hearing an appeal filed by Nobel Peace Prize winner Professor Dr Muhammad Yunus.
