= Wuhan Textile University =

Provincial public university in Wuhan, Hubei, China

- 武汉纺织大学
- Former name: Wuhan Textile Engineering College
- Motto: 崇真尚美
- Motto in English: Uphold Truth, Pursue Beauty
- Type: Public university
- Established: October 18, 1958
- President: Fu Xin
- Academic staff: 2,400
- Students: 27,000
- Location: Wuhan, Hubei, China; 30°29′17″N 114°23′36″E
- Campus: 145 ha (360 acres)
- Colours: WTU Blue
- Website: wtu.edu.cn english.wtu.edu.cn

Wuhan Textile University (WTU; 武汉纺织大学) is a public university in Wuhan, China. It occupies three distinct campuses across the city: Nanhu Campus (the original campus), Yangguang Campus (the main campus), and Donghu Campus (formerly belonging to Hubei College of Finance and Economics). The university covers a land area of more than 2,400 mu, with a building floor area exceeding 700,000 square meters.

It is designated as a university under Hubei Province's "First-class Disciplines Development Initiative", one of China’s Top Ten Fashion Universities, a participant in the National Basic Capacity Building Project for Midwestern Universities, an implementing institution of the Outstanding Engineer Education and Training Program, and a selected university of the Overseas Talent Introduction Program for Disciplinary Innovation (the "111 Program").

Centered on engineering disciplines, the university features coordinated development across engineering, science, art, economics, management, liberal arts, law and interdisciplinary fields, with distinctive strengths in textile and apparel disciplines. It holds membership in multiple international alliances, including the Association of Universities for Textiles (AUTEX), International Foundation of Fashion Technology Institutes (IFFTI), the Belt and Road World Textile University Alliance, and the China-CEEC (17+1) Higher Education Alliance.

The university offers 68 undergraduate majors, 2 first-level disciplines authorized to confer doctoral degrees, 16 first-level disciplines authorized to confer master's degrees, and 15 categories of professional master’s degrees. It is the first provincial university in Hubei Province to cultivate an academician of the Chinese Academy of Engineering from its own faculty.

As of April 2026, the university has nearly 27,000 full-time students and more than 2,400 faculty and staff members.

== History ==
The history of Wuhan Textile University can be traced back to the Wuhan Institute of Textile Technology and the Hubei Light Industry School, both established in 1958. After several organizational changes, it evolved into its current structure.

- 1958: Wuhan Institute of Textile Technology was founded at Sancenglou, Wuchang, Wuhan, under the leadership of Wuhan Municipality. In the same year, Hubei Light Industry School was established at Mafangshan, Wuchang, under the leadership of the Hubei Provincial Bureau of Light Industry.
- 1962: Wuhan Institute of Textile Technology was suspended.
- Cultural Revolution Period: Hubei Light Industry School temporarily suspended its operations and resumed teaching in 1970.
- 1978: Approved by the National Education Commission, four new schools were established based on the separation of the light industry and textile majors of Hubei Light Industry School. The textile major was split to form the Wuhan Institute of Textile Technology and the Hubei Textile Industry School; the light industry major was split to form the Hubei Institute of Light Industry and the Hubei Light Industry School. Among them, the Wuhan Institute of Textile Technology was one of the institutions approved by the State Council for reconstruction and was affiliated with the Ministry of Textile Industry.
- 1998: The educational management system of the Wuhan Institute of Textile Technology was restructured and transitioned to be jointly administered by the central government and Hubei Province.
- 1999: Wuhan Institute of Textile Technology was renamed Wuhan University of Science and Technology (WUST) (Note: known at the time as Wuhan Institute of Technology before university status).
- 2002: Hubei Foreign Trade School, established in 1958, was merged into Wuhan University of Science and Technology.
- 2006: Hubei College of Finance and Economics was placed under the temporary management of Wuhan University of Science and Technology by the Department of Education, following a directive from the Hubei Provincial Government.
- 2010: Wuhan University of Science and Technology was renamed Wuhan Textile University.
- 2011: Hubei College of Finance and Economics was formally merged into Wuhan Textile University.
- 2012: The university was selected for the first national batch of the "Basic Capacity Building Project for Universities in the Midwest Region."
- 2015: The university transitioned entirely into the first batch of undergraduate admissions (Tier 1) and completed the Undergraduate Teaching Work Audit Evaluation by the Ministry of Education.
- 2016: Birmingham Institute of Fashion and Creative Art, the province's first undergraduate-level Sino-foreign cooperative education institution, was officially established.
- 2018: Selected as a "Domestic First-Class Discipline Construction University" in Hubei Province, with Textile Science and Engineering designated as a provincial first-class construction discipline.
- 2019: Approved as an Inheritance Base for Excellent Traditional Chinese Culture by the Ministry of Education.
- 2020: The fabric version of the five-star red flag on the lunar surface, developed by the university, landed on the Moon with the Chang'e-5 spacecraft and was successfully displayed.
- 2021: Professor Xu Weilin was elected as an academician of the Chinese Academy of Engineering, making the university the first provincial institution in Hubei to independently cultivate an academician; the State Key Laboratory of New Textile Materials and Advanced Processing Technology was approved for construction; the high-temperature resistant elastic sealing device supported the Tianwen-1 Mars landing mission.
- 2022: Textile Science and Engineering was established as a key construction discipline for first-class disciplines in provincial universities of Hubei.
- 2023: The university was approved as a base for the "111 Program" (University Discipline Innovation and Talent Introduction Plan); the Textile Science and Technology Museum of Wuhan Textile University was officially unveiled.
- 2024: The two primary disciplines of Textile Science and Engineering and Design were granted doctoral degree-conferring authority.

== Faculties and departments ==
Wuhan Textile University comprises the following academic schools and departments:

- Birmingham Institute of Fashion and Creative Arts（伯明翰时尚创意学院)
- School of Textile Science and Engineering（纺织科学与工程学院）
- School of Mechanical Engineering and Automation（机械工程与自动化学院）
- School of Chemistry and Chemical Engineering（化学与化工学院）
- School of Resources and Environmental Engineering（资源与环境学院）
- School of Electronic and Electrical Engineering（电子与电气工程学院）
- School of Computer Science and Artificial Intelligence（计算机与人工智能学院）
- School of Mathematics and Statistics（数学与统计学院）
- School of Microelectronics（微电子学院）
- School of Materials Science and Engineering（材料科学与工程学院）
- School of Biomedical Engineering and Health（生物医学工程与健康学院）
- School of Innovation and Design（创新设计学院）
- School of Fashion（服装学院）
- School of Media and Communication（传媒学院）
- School of Management（管理学院）
- School of Economics（经济学院）
- School of Foreign Languages（外国语学院)
- School of Marxism（马克思主义学院）
- Department of Physical Education（体育部）
- School of Continuing Education（继续教育学院）
- School of International Education（国际教育学院)

== Notable alumni ==
XU Weilin–Academician of the Chinese Academy of Engineering, expert in textile and polymer materials, Secretary of the Party Committee of Wuhan Textile University, Vice Chairman of the China Textile Engineering Society, Vice Chairman of the Hubei Association for Science and Technology.

HU Jinlian–Professor jointly appointed by the Department of Biomedical Engineering and the Department of Materials Science and Engineering at City University of Hong Kong; Fellow of the National Academy of Inventors (USA), Fellow of the Royal Society of Chemistry, Fellow of The Textile Institute (UK), Fellow of the Hong Kong Institution of Textiles and Apparel, Founding Chairman of Hong Kong Health Science and Technology Park, Executive Vice Chairman of the Hong Kong Federation of Invention and Innovation. She is hailed as the founder of shape memory fibers.

QIN Xiaohong–Fellow of the China Textile Engineering Society, Dean, Professor and Doctoral Supervisor of the College of Textiles, Donghua University.

LI Li–Associate Professor and Doctoral Supervisor at the Institute of Textiles and Clothing, The Hong Kong Polytechnic University; academic designer specializing in functional apparel and smart wearable design, a leading international scholar in fabric and fashion design research.

XIA Zhigang–Third-level Professor and Master’s Supervisor at the School of Textile Science and Engineering, Wuhan Textile University; Director of the Key Laboratory of Yarn and Functionalization in the Textile Industry.

LI Jianquan–Chairman and General Manager of Winner Medical Co., Ltd., Chairman and General Manager of PurCotton Technology Co., Ltd. Founder of the Medical Dressing Branch of China Chamber of Commerce for Import and Export of Light Industrial Products and Arts-Crafts, Vice Chairman of the China Cotton Association. In the 2025 Hurun China Rich List, he ranked 443rd with a personal fortune of RMB 15 billion.

YAN Zhanglian–The exclusive designer of the official logo for Wuhan UNESCO City of Design; Member of the International Council of Graphic Design Associations (ico-D), International Jury Member of the A' Design Award (Italy). Recipient of the Grand Prize at the Asia Graphic Design Biennale, Silver Award at Graphis Poster Annual (USA), and multiple Italian international design awards. A top Chinese international poster designer and Visiting Professor at Wuhan Textile University.

YE Youtian–Invited visual designer for the official stamps of the Beijing 2022 Winter Olympics; Gold Award winner of GDC (China’s top graphic design award); Associate Professor and Master’s Supervisor at Hubei Institute of Fine Arts.

ZHANG En–Winner of the 30th China Top Ten Fashion Designer award, Creative Director of haute couture brand NUNU NONO; collaborative designer for Paris Fashion Week, Cannes Film Festival, and national guest ceremonial gowns.

ZHANG Wenhui–Former Chief Womenswear Designer of Shanghai Tang, a high-end Chinese-style fashion brand based in Hong Kong; personal couturier for celebrities including Karen Mok and Lin Chi-ling; Associate Professor and Master’s Supervisor at Wuhan Textile University.

LIU Yong–Two-time recipient of the China Fashion Design Top Award (Golden Summit Award), two-time China Top Ten Fashion Designer; core designer for national leaders’ APEC formal wear; Founder of high-end womenswear brand NAERSI.

HUANG Liyong–Winner of the 19th China Top Ten Fashion Designer award, Founder of independent womenswear brand EYMOOD; Associate Professor and Master’s Supervisor at Wuhan Textile University.

LÜ Yonggang–Professor and Doctoral Supervisor at Chongqing University; Deputy Chairman and Secretary-General of the Hemorheology Committee of the Chinese Society of Microcirculation, Associate Editor of the journal Medical & Biological Engineering & Computing.

CHENG Si–Founder and independent jewelry designer of WELLEN Jewelry; Lecturer majoring in jewelry design at Sichuan Normal University.

SUN Ying’an–Deputy to the 11th National People’s Congress of the People’s Republic of China, Chairman and Legal Representative of Hubei Xiaomian Industrial Group Co., Ltd.

ZHANG Dinghong–Chairman and Legal Representative of Zhongbonong Animal Husbandry Technology Co., Ltd.

QIAO Dewei–Legal Representative of Dynagreen Environmental Protection Group Co., Ltd. Awarded the honorary title of "Republic Innovation Entrepreneur in the 30th Anniversary of Reform and Opening-up" in 2008.

FAN Mengdi–National Level I Volleyball Athlete, Chief Organizer of the 2017 China High-End Sports Industry Forum.

YIN Shiyi–Deputy Secretary of the Communist Youth League Qingdao Municipal Committee.

LÜ Shigan–Chairman of Shenzhen Tongli Southern Elevator Sales Co., Ltd. and Shenzhen Zhenyin Investment Development Co., Ltd., Vice Chairman of Hubei Chamber of Commerce in Shenzhen.

CAI Xueyuan–Chairman and General Manager of Shenzhen Yuanxing Technology Co., Ltd.

SUN Jiajun–Chairman of Jiangsu Huarui Fashion Group.

※ The entries are listed in no particular order and only a partial selection is presented.

== International exchanges ==
In terms of international exchanges, Wuhan Textile University has signed academic exchange agreements with renowned overseas universities including the University of Manchester and Birmingham City University in the United Kingdom, Monash University and RMIT University (Royal Melbourne Institute of Technology) in Australia, Hanyang University in the Republic of Korea, Gadjah Mada University in Indonesia, and Fashion Institute of Technology (FIT) in the United States. It carries out various programs such as joint degree programs, student exchange semesters, short-term training workshops, joint scientific research, and faculty mobility schemes.

The university hosts more than 500 international students originating from 64 countries and regions. As an authorized organizer of foreign aid programs commissioned by the Ministry of Commerce of China, it has run 115 training sessions, delivering professional training to approximately 3,200 government officials and technical specialists from nearly 100 countries worldwide.

== Campus map ==
Wuhan Textile University has three campuses, namely Nanhu Campus, Yangguang Campus and Donghu Campus：

Nanhu Campus：No. 1 Fangzhi Road, Hongshan District, Wuhan City, Hubei Province, People’s Republic of China.

- This campus serves as the university’s primary teaching hub. It houses the School of Media and Communication, School of Fashion, School of Innovation and Design, Birmingham Institute of Fashion and Creative Arts, School of Marxism, and School of International Education.

Yangguang Campus：No. 1 Yangguang Avenue, Jiangxia District, Wuhan City, Hubei Province, People’s Republic of China.

- This campus is the university’s major teaching base. Its facilities include Chongzhen Building, Chongli Building, Administration Building, University Library, and the Textile Science and Technology Museum.

Donghu Campus:No. 1 Yuguang Village, Liyuan, East Lake, Wuchang District, Wuhan City, Hubei Province, People’s Republic of China.

== Research ==
As of April 2026, Wuhan Textile University has undertaken and carried out more than 1,000 research projects, including key national R&D programs, National Natural Science Foundation projects and National Social Science Foundation projects. The university has won 1 First Prize and 3 Second Prizes of the National Science and Technology Progress Award, as well as 2 Second Prizes of the National Technological Invention Award. It has also received 1 Second Prize and 2 Third Prizes of the Outstanding Achievements in Humanities and Social Sciences Research in Chinese Universities, with over 10 artworks selected for national-level art exhibitions.

In addition, the university has participated in the development of major national aerospace projects, such as the lunar flag made of lunar fabric for Chang'e-5, the lunar flag fabricated from basalt fiber for Chang'e-6, and the heat-resistant elastic sealing device used for the Mars lander.

Research Achievements of Wuhan Textile University (Partial List)
Project Name	Award Level
High-efficiency Short-process Embedded Composite Spinning Technology	First Prize of National Science and Technology Progress Award
Ultrafine Powder Processing Technology for High-quality Natural Polymer Materials and Its High-value Recycling	Second Prize of National Technological Invention Award
Microwave Electrodeless UV Photocatalytic Oxidation Classification Treatment and Reuse Technology for Textile Printing and Dyeing Wastewater	Second Prize of National Technological Invention Award
Complete Denitrification and Refining Technology for Lubricant Base Oil and Its Application	Second Prize of National Technological Invention Award
Development and Industrial Application of Complete Industrialization Technology for Polyphenylene Sulfide (PPS) Fibers	Second Prize of National Science and Technology Progress Award
ASP/SaaS-based Collaborative Platform for Industrial Value Chains in Manufacturing	Second Prize of National Science and Technology Progress Award
Energy-saving Twisting Preparation Technology and Equipment for High-performance Industrial Filaments and Its Industrialization	Second Prize of National Science and Technology Progress Award
Layered Agglomeration Regulation of Fibers in Spinning Triangle and Industrial Production of High-performance Yarns and Fabrics	First Prize of Hubei Provincial Technological Invention Award
Processing Technology of Unidirectional Sweat-wicking Textile Fabrics Made of Pure Natural Fibers and Its Advanced Testing Technology	First Prize of Hubei Provincial Science and Technology Progress Award
Photochemical Decolorization Technology and Equipment for Printing and Dyeing Wastewater	First Prize of Hubei Provincial Science and Technology Progress Award
Development of Nanofiber Materials and Nano-functional Textiles	First Prize of Shandong Provincial Science and Technology Progress Award
Key Technologies of High-efficiency and Energy-saving Automatic Screen Printing Equipment	First Prize of Hubei Provincial Technological Invention Award
Regulation of Surface Physicochemical Properties of Fiber Materials and Its Industrial Application	First Prize of Hubei Provincial Technological Invention Award
Complete Industrialization Technology and Equipment for Alginate Fiber Preparation	First Prize of Shandong Provincial Science and Technology Progress Award
Key Manufacturing Technologies of Polymer Nanofibers and Its Gradient Filter Materials	First Prize of Hubei Provincial Technological Invention Award
Key Preparation and Application Technologies of Fabric-based Flexible Wearable Sensing Materials and Devices	Special Project of the 14th Five-Year Plan under National Key R&D Program

※ Data as of December 2022; this list is incomplete.
