= Bangladesh Trade Union Centre =

National trade union federation

BTUC
- Bangladesh Trade Union Centre
- বাংলাদেশ ট্রেড ইউনিয়ন কেন্দ্র
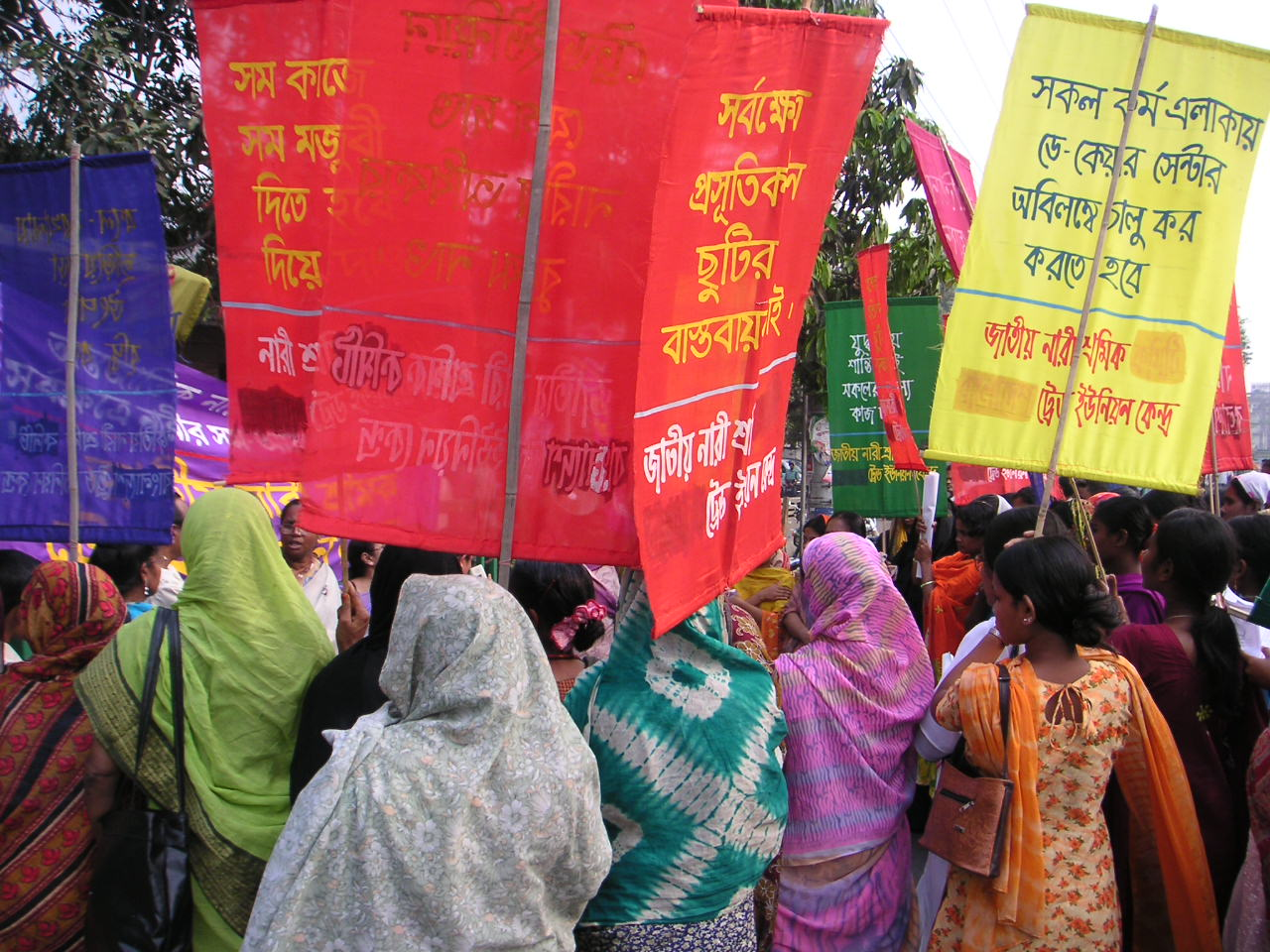
- BTUC members on International Women's Day
- Headquarters: 23/2 Topkhana Road; Dhaka
- Location: Bangladesh
- Members: 50,180 (2003)
- Key people: Wajedul Islam Khan, General Secretary; Shihidullah Chowdhury, President
- Affiliations: WFTU (International) BGWTUC (Garment wing)

The Bangladesh Trade Union Centre (BTUC) (Bengali: বাংলাদেশ ট্রেড ইউনিয়ন কেন্দ্র, Bānlādēśa ṭrēḍa i'uniẏana kēndra) is a national trade union federation in Bangladesh. It is affiliated internationally with the World Federation of Trade Unions.

== History ==
After a fire in a Keraniganj plastic factory in 2019, where 13 workers died of burns and 19 were heavily injured due to the factory building not having any emergency exits, BTUC General Secretary Wajedul Islam Khan demanded better compensation and government action to force factories to adhere to existing workplace safety standards.

During the COVID-19 pandemic, BTUC organised human chains in front of the National Press Club in Dhaka, demanding rations of food for workers, health protections and the timely payment of wages.
