= Garment Workers Unity Forum =

National trade union of garment workers in Bangladesh

GWUF
- Garment Workers Unity Forum
- গার্মেন্টস শ্রমিক ঐক্য ফোরাম
- Headquarters: Dhaka, Bangladesh
- Location: Bangladesh
- Members: 80,000 (2015)
- Key people: Mushrefa Mishu, president

The Garment Workers Unity Forum (GWUF) (Bengali: গার্মেন্টস শ্রমিক ঐক্য ফোরাম) is a national trade union federation of garment workers in Bangladesh.

== History ==
In 2010, GWUF organised protests to demand an increase of the minimum wage for garment workers. Tens of thousands of workers in Ashulia laid down their work. The protests escalated, with workers burning tyres, destroying vehicles and vandalising factories, which led to the police using rubber bullets and tear gas. The protests were stopped when the government announced it would raise the minimum wage to 5,000 taka (~€50/$59) a month. Together with other protestors, GWUF president Mushrefa Mishu was detained on December 14 after being accused of having "ransacked" a garment company's office. Amnesty International condemned the arrests and the deaths of four people during the protests.

In 2015, GWUF conducted a survey that concluded 95 percent of Bangladeshi garment workers had never heard of the Accord on Fire and Building Safety in Bangladesh or the Alliance for Bangladesh Worker Safety, seriously undermining the idea that either of them actually represented the needs of Bangladeshi workers.

In 2016, GWUF submitted an OECD complaint against TÜV Rheinland together with the European Center for Constitutional and Human Rights and other partners. The complaint detailed alleged failures of a report submitted by TÜV Rheinland on the Rana Plaza factory building in Dhaka some months before its collapse in 2013. In response, the German Ministry for Economic Affairs acknowledged that a reform of factory audits in Bangladesh's garment industry was needed.

On December 21, 2016, GWUF president Mushrefa Mishu was detained by the Detective Branch of Dhaka Metropolitan Police. She was released on the same day, on the condition that she would "refrain from further protests".
