= Bangladesh Jatiya Sramik League =

Trade union federation

- বাংলাদেশ জাতীয় শ্রমিক লীগ
- Abbreviation: BJSL
- Nickname: Sramik League
- Founded: 1969
- Location: Bangladesh
- Members: 150,000
- Secretary General: K.M. Azam Khasru
- Parent organisation: Bangladesh Awami League
- Affiliations: ITUC; BRTWF

The Bangladesh Jatiya Sramik League (Bengali: বাংলাদেশ জাতীয় শ্রমিক লীগ, lit. 'Bangladesh National Workers' League') was a national trade union federation in Bangladesh. Since the conviction of the ousted prime minister Sheikh Hasina and her political party Bangladesh Awami League, all their activities have been prohibited including the Bangladesh Jatiya Sramik League.

Nationally, it is affiliated with the National Coordination Committee for Workers' Education and internationally with the International Trade Union Confederation. K.M. Azam Khasru is general secretary of the union and Fazlul Haque Montu was its president until his death in 2020.

== History ==
The Bangladesh Jatiya Sramik League was founded in 1969 by Sheikh Mujibur Rahman, It is politically tied to the Awami League.

On 12 May 2025, The government of Bangladesh banned all activities of the Awami League and its affiliated organisations under the Anti-Terrorism Act.
