= Minimum Wage Board =

Bangladesh minimum wage regulatory body

- Formation: 1959
- Headquarters: Dhaka, Bangladesh
- Region served: Bangladesh
- Official language: Bengali
- Parent organization: Ministry of Labour and Employment
- Website: Minimum Wage Board

The Minimum Wage Board (Bengali: নিম্নতম মজুরী বোর্ড) is a Bangladesh government regulatory agency under the Ministry of Labour and Employment responsible for recommending changes to the minimum wage, which varies by industry, to the government.

== History ==
Minimum Wage Board was established in 1959 by the Government of Pakistan based on the International Labour Organization conference in 1928. The board is responsible for establishing the minimum wage for all industries including the Textile industry in Bangladesh. According to Bangladesh labor law, minimum wages must be revised every five years.
