= Bangladesh Garment Workers Trade Union Centre =

Bangladeshi trade union federation

GWTUC
- Bangladesh Garment Workers Trade Union Centre
- বাংলাদেশ গার্মেন্ট শ্রমিক ট্রেড ইউনিয়ন কেন্দ্র
- Founded: 1994
- Location: Bangladesh
- Members: 125,000 claimed
- Key people: Montu Ghosh, President; Joly Talukder, Vice President
- Parent organization: Bangladesh Trade Union Centre
- Affiliations: Communist Party of Bangladesh
- Website: www.gwtuc.org

The Bangladesh Garment Workers Trade Union Centre (GWTUC) (Bengali: বাংলাদেশ গার্মেন্ট শ্রমিক ট্রেড ইউনিয়ন কেন্দ্র, bānlādēśa gārmēnṭa śramika ṭrēḍa i'uniẏana kēndra) is a trade union federation of garment workers in Bangladesh. It is one of the largest trade unions in that sector, with more than 20 factory trade unions affiliated to it. It has enough members to be formally recognised as a trade union, but does not have that status, as is not uncommon for left-oriented unions in Bangladesh. Politically, GWTUC is aligned with the Communist Party of Bangladesh.

== Context ==
The rate of trade union membership among Bangladeshi garment workers is very low, only around 1.12 percent of the total labour force. Among the reasons for this are restrictive laws on founding unions and trade union centres, together with active intimidation and harassment against union activists. Union organising is altogether banned in export zones, nursing or rural electrification. In 2020, Bangladesh was rated one of the world's ten worst countries for workers in the ITUC's annual Global Rights Index.

Another reason is that almost all unions in Bangladesh are affiliated to political parties, which weakens their ability to work together in collective bargaining, especially since the majority of Bangladesh's parliamentarians are owners of garment or other factories themselves.

== History ==
In 2010, GWTUC worked together with the Bangladesh Center for Workers' Solidarity and the Garment and Industrial Workers Federation to organise demonstrations calling for a raise of the minimum monthly wage to 5,000 taka (~€50/$59). In August, trade union leaders including Montu Ghosh, then an advisor to the GWTUC, were arrested, leading to international reports and condemnation. Protests were again organised when factories did not pay out the new minimum wage of 3,000 taka. By December, most factories had implemented the new minimum wage and resumed normal production.

In 2014, GWTUC took part in the coordination of a hunger strike at an occupied Tuba Group factory in Dhaka, demanding the payment of three months overdue salaries for the nearly 1.600 workers. Another demand was compensation for the dead and injured of the 2012 Dhaka garment factory fire, who had also been employees of Tuba Group. Protests were attacked by police, and the occupied factory's water supply cut off. The overdue salaries were paid in August. One week later, all five Tube Group factories were closed down, stripping all their workers of employment. In October, workers and leaders forced their way into the office of Tuba Group's owner and locked themselves inside with him. After 18 hours, a bonus was paid to 900 workers and the hunger strike ended. Many workers remained unemployed afterwards due to their involvement in the union action.

In 2017, GWTUC organised a rally of workers of Multifabs Ltd in Dhaka, demanding legal action against the company. 13 workers had died and others were injured when an expired boiler had exploded inside the company's factory in Gazipur. The union called for compensation of the dead workers' families and the payment of the medical expenses of injured workers. Two of the injured workers died later. All fifteen families received full salaries and bonuses.

In May of that year, workers at Ashiana Garment Ind formed a union affiliated with GWTUC. They faced harassment and arrests, while authorities refused the union's registration. In January 2018, workers and GWTUC leaders were invited to a meeting with representatives of the Bangladesh Garment Manufacturers and Exporters Association (BGMEA), only to find out outside the building the meeting had been cancelled. They were then attacked by a group armed with iron rods that injured 37 workers, who had to be treated at Dhaka Medical College and Hospital. BGMEA later filed a complaint against 12 GWTUC leaders and 150 workers, alleging they were involved in violence, vandalism and attempted murder of its officials. 2 workers were later arrested and thirty laid off.

On April 1, 2018, GWTUC General Secretary Joly Talukder and five of its other leaders were arrested based on the BGMEA's charges. Talukder was held in solitary confinement. Communist Party of Bangladesh leader Sazedur Rahman Shameem was allegedly arrested when he attended court to request an extension of their bail. The arrests provoked outrage in Bangladesh and abroad, with the Clean Clothes Campaign and German union ver.di calling for the prisoners' release. All seven were released on April 5 on interim bail.

In September 2018, GWTUC organised demonstrations rejecting an increase of the minimum wage for garment workers as "inhumane" and demanding the double of the planned amount. Following the protests, more than 5.000 GWTUC workers were laid off from more than 25 factories.

From March to June 2020, Dragon Group laid off more than 500 of its workers without paying outstanding wages. The layoffs especially targeted employees with more work experience who had demanded the pay of salaries the company already owed them. GWTUC organised the worker's response, including a blockade of Bangladesh's labour ministry. The owner broke an agreement to pay due wages by November 7.
