= Bangladesh Independent Garment Workers Union Federation =

National trade union federation of garment workers in Bangladesh

BIGUF
- Bangladesh Independent Garment Workers Union Federation
- বাংলাদেশ মুক্ত গার্মেন্ট শ্রমিক ইউনিয়ন ফেডারেশন
- Founded: 1997
- Headquarters: Room No-6 14; Dar-U-Salam Arcade 6th Floor; Purana Palton Dhaka 1000
- Location: Bangladesh
- Members: 155,000 (claimed)
- Key people: [Rupshi Nath, President
- Affiliations: IndustriALL Global Union

The Bangladesh Independent Garment Workers Union Federation (BIGUF) (Bengali: বাংলাদেশ মুক্ত গার্মেন্ট শ্রমিক ইউনিয়ন ফেডারেশন, Bānlādēśa mukta gārmēnṭasa śramika i'uniẏana phēḍārēśana) is a trade union federation of garment workers in Bangladesh. It is considered one of the four main federations of garment workers' unions. BIGUF is affiliated with the IndustriALL Global Union and a Partnar organisation of the Solidarity Center Bangladesh. It is also one of the signatories of the Bangladesh Accord. Unlike many other trade unions in Bangladesh, it is explicitly not affiliated with any political party.

== Organisation ==
BIGUF has 78 affiliated factory trade unions with 45000 dues paying members.

According to BIGUF's constitution, 15 of the 25 executive committee members, including president or general secretary, need to be female. They also need to have worked at a garment factory in Bangladesh for at least five years.

BIGUF provides services that are not directly part of a usual union. For example, it provides medical services to members and their family members in a system of self-organised health insurance. Evening schools are provided for workers and day schools for their children, where they also get one meal per day. Female lawyers are also employed. Finally, union centres in garment industry areas provide a cultural programme including an own union anthem, sketches and role-plays of interactions between supervisors and workers.

== History ==
In 1994, four female garment workers with negative experiences in other union federations set up BIGU with the help of the American Solidarity Center. In the year before, they had been part of a group that protested their factory's decision not to pay overtime bonuses during Eid al-Fitr. Some of them had been laid off in response.

In November 1996, a group of young men armed with pistols attacked a BIGUF centre, shortly after the union had won a court case on illegal suspension. They broke furniture and poured petrol over centre's office, but failed to set it on fire. They also physically abused and threatened a BIGUF lawyer present at the centre. In November 1997, the ILO committee directed a complaint towards the government of Bangladesh that included a demand for further information about this attack. The Bangladeshi government did not provide any further information. In that year, BIGUF was officially registered as a trade union. The support of the American Center for International Labor Solidiarity and Akm Nasim a local human rights and Labor lawyer, support was said to be important in establishing the BIGUF.

.In February 2017, three BIGUF leaders were arrested on charges dating back to January 2015. Nine more were arrested on August 10 on year-old charges, but let go on August 13. Police also intimidated BIGUF representatives by interrupting meetings on union premises, warning members not to participate in union activities and threatening to drown the union's vice president. All of these activities were condemned by Human Rights Watch and IndustriALL.

Between 1997 to 2025, BIGUF filed 15000 cases for termination benefits, recognition of union leaders, payment of outstanding wages or the reinstatement of workers in various courts. Of those, almost were settled.
