= Abdus Sobhan =

Bangladeshi politician (1936–2020)

Muhammad Abdus Sobhan

Member of Parliament for Pabna-5
- In office 1991–1995
- In office 2001–2006

Personal details
- Born: 19 February 1936 Sujanagar, Pabna
- Died: 14 February 2020 (aged 83) Dhaka Medical College Hospital
- Resting place: Pabna Sadar Arifpur graveyard
- Citizenship: Bangladesh
- Party: Bangladesh Jamaat-e-Islami
- Occupation: Politics
- Known for: Islami politics & religious personality

Maulana Muhammad Abdus Sobhan (Bengali: মাওলানা মুহাম্মদ আব্দুস সুবহান; 19 February 1936 – 14 February 2020) was a Bangladeshi politician. He was a Senior Nayeeb-e-Ameer central committee of the Bangladesh Jamaat-e-Islami. He was a two term parliamentarian from the Pabna-5 constituency, elected in 1991 and 2001. He went to trial for his relationship with war crimes allegedly committed during the War of Liberation of Bangladesh in 1971.

== Early life and education ==
Abdus Sobhan was born on 19 February 1936 in the village of Mominpara, Sujanagar thana, Pabna district. His father, Munshi Nayeem Uddin Ahmed, was an Islamic scholar. In 1965, he moved with his family to Pathortola, Gopalpur, Pabna city, and has resided there permanently. He enrolled at the Ramchandrapur Maktab. Then he completed his primary education in Manikhaat and Machpara Primary School. In 1941, he enrolled into Ulat Madrassah and studied there till 1947, completing his matriculation. In 1950, he obtained his alim certification. In 1952, he obtained his fazil degree from Sirajganj Alia Madrassah. In 1954, he obtained his kamil degree with distinction from the same madrassah, obtaining 7th position in the first division in the madrassah board.

== Career ==
=== Teaching ===
After completion of his fazil studies, he joined Pabna Aliya Madrasah. After that he taught at Gopalchandra institute, Arifpur Ulat Senior Madrassah and Magura Baroria Fazil Madrasah. His teaching career spanned 10 years from 1952 to 1962.

=== Politics ===
Abdus Sobhan was active in politics from his student life. He was secretary of Pabna District for East Pakistan Jamiat Talaba Arabiya. In 1951, he joined Jamaat-e-Islami and over time was appointed the Ameer of Pabna District. He was a member of the Central Majlis-e-Shura, the central working committee and the executive committee of Bangladesh Jamaat-e-Islami. He was also a Nayeb-e-Ameer of the party.

==== Member of parliament ====
In 1962 and again in 1965, he was elected as a member of the East Pakistan Constituent Assembly and acted as the senior deputy leader of the opposition in his latter term. He was a member of parliament elected from the Pabna-5 constituency in 1991, and deputy leader of the Jamaat's parliamentary group, securing 47.31% of the votes. In 2001, he was again elected as a member of parliament from the Pabna-5 constituency as a candidate of the 4-party alliance, securing 56.78% of the votes in his constituency. In 1996, he campaigned on a platform to increase women's education—in a separate environment from men.

== Arrest and trial ==
Abdus Sobhan was arrested on 20 September 2012 from Bangabandhu Bridge area while he was traveling from Dhaka to Pabna. Later, he was taken to Pabna to appear before the court that issued the warrant against him in connection with a case filed in 2003.

A day after his arrest he appeared before the International Crimes Tribunal (Bangladesh) in Dhaka on charges of crimes against humanity committed during the Liberation War of Bangladesh in 1971. The International Crimes Tribunal-1 (ICT) framed nine charges of wartime offences against Abdus Sobhan for alleged crimes against humanity in 1971. Sobhan denied the charges brought against him and claimed that he had served as a mole for the Mukti Bahini against Pakistani forces in his time at the Peace Committee.

== Death ==
Abdus Sobhan died on 14 February 2020 at Dhaka Medical College Hospital at the age of 83. He was buried the following day at Pabna Sadar Arifpur graveyard.
