= Bangladesh Garment Manufacturers and Exporters Association =

Trade Organization

Bangladesh Garment Manufacturers and Exporters Association (BGMEA)
- বাংলাদেশ পোশাক প্রস্তুতকারক ও রপ্তানিকারক সমিতি
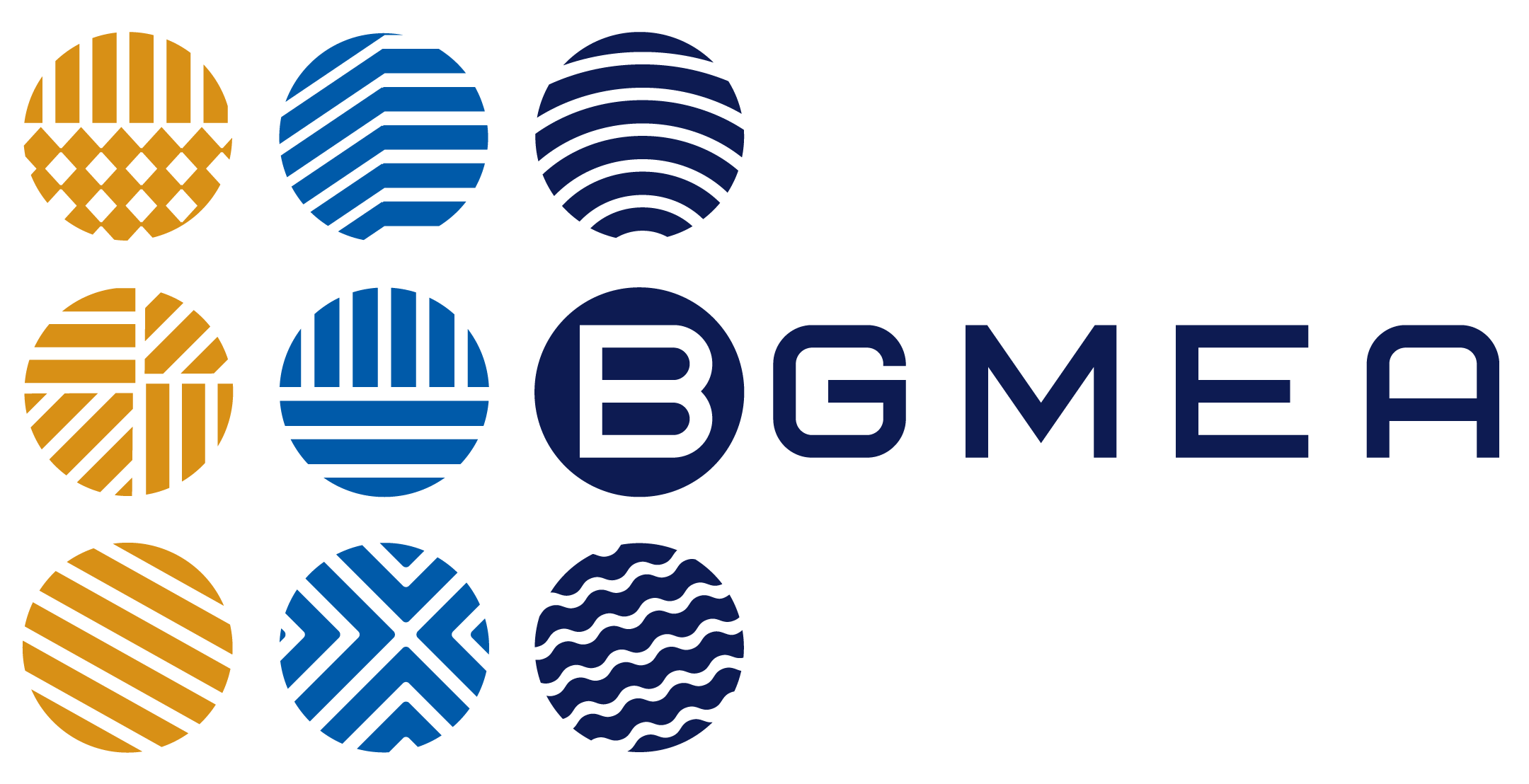
- Logo of BGMEA

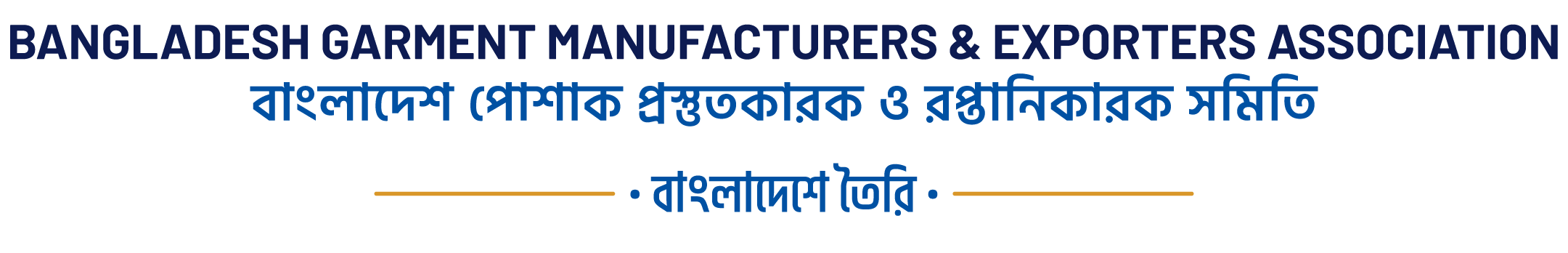
- Abbreviation: BGMEA
- Formation: 1983
- Type: Trade association
- Headquarters: BGMEA Complex, Dhaka
- Region served: Bangladesh
- Official language: Bengali, English
- President: Mahmud Hasan Khan
- Affiliations: Ministry of Industries; Department of Textiles; Bangladesh University of Textiles; BGMEA University of Fashion & Technology; National Institute of Textile Engineering & Research
- Website: bgmea.com.bd

Bangladesh Garment Manufacturers and Exporters Association or BGMEA (Bengali: বাংলাদেশ পোশাক প্রস্তুত ও রপ্তানিকারক সমিতি) is a nationwide trade organization of garments manufacturers in Bangladesh and is located in the capital city of Dhaka. It plays a pivotal role in the country's earning sector of foreign trades.

== History ==
BGMEA was founded in 1983. BGMEA University of Fashion and Technology is owned by the trade body. The trade body has a research wing. Chattogram BGMEA University of Fashion & Technology was founded in 2022 by the BGMEA. It aims to develop skilled professionals with updated technical competence for textile industries in Chittagong.

=== BGMEA Bhaban ===
BGMEA Bhaban (BGMEA Building) is a 16-storey building that is the headquarters of BGMEA and is located in Hatirjheel, Dhaka. The foundation of the building was placed in 1998, by then Prime Minister Sheikh Hasina. In 2006, it was inaugurated by then Prime Minister Khaleda Zia. The building was built illegally on canal land.

On 3 April 2011, Bangladesh High Court ordered the building to be demolished. The court in its verdict declared:

The BGMEA Bhaban is like a cancer in the Hatirjheel project and if the building is not taken down immediately, it will infect not just Hatirjheel but the entire Dhaka City.

A four-member bench of the Appellate Division of the Supreme Court of Bangladesh led by chief justice Surendra Kumar Sinha upheld the verdict of the High Court on 2 June 2016.

== Board of Directors ==
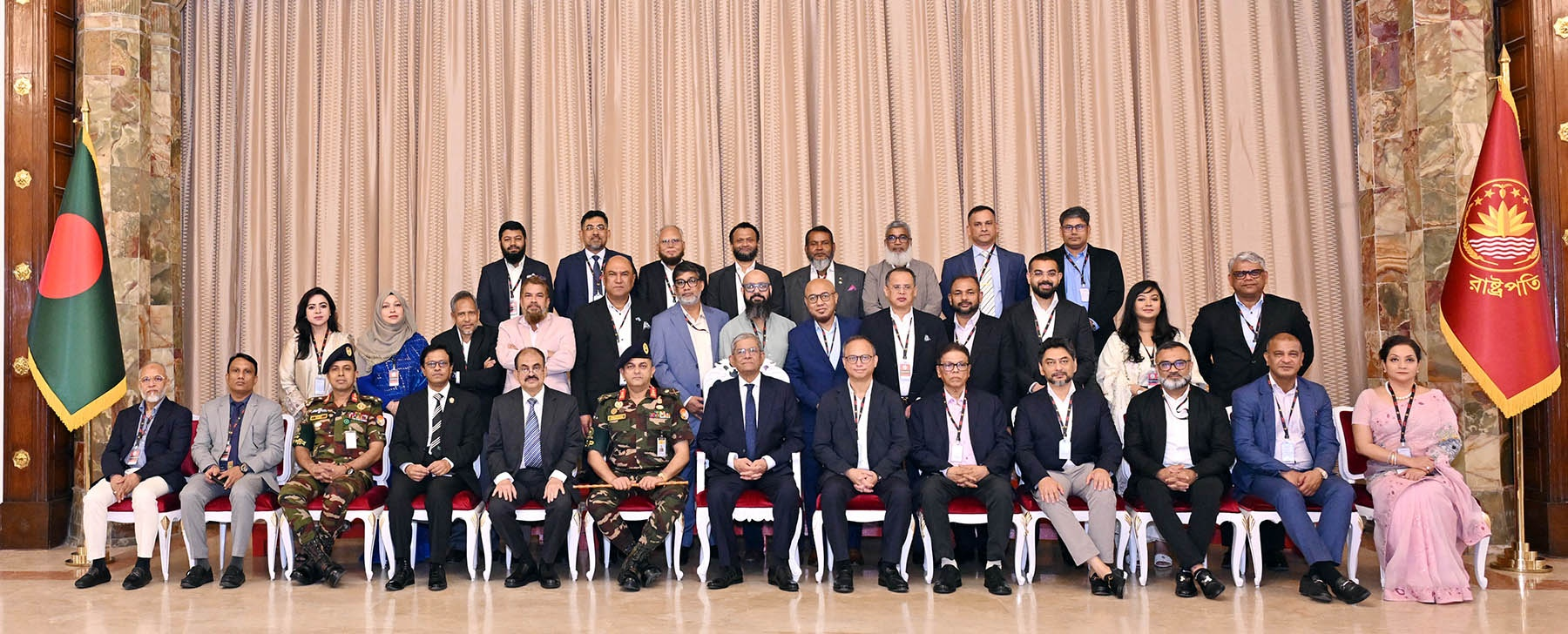
BGMEA delegation with President of Bangladesh, 2026

BGMEA has a board of directors to take strategic decisions for Bangladeshi garment industry.

M.A. Rahim (Feroz)	Managing Director, Dulal Brothers Ltd.
Arshad Jamal (Dipu)	Chairman, Tusuka Fashions Ltd.
Mahmud Hasan Khan (Babu)	Managing Director, Rising Apparels Ltd.
Barrister Shehrin Salam Oishee	Director, Envoy Design Ltd.
Asif Ashraf	Managing Director, Urmi Garments Ltd.
Md. Mohiuddin Rubel	Director, Denim Expert Ltd.
Asif Ibrahim	Managing Director, Keilock Newage Bangladesh Ltd.
Tanvir Ahmed	Director, Envoy Fashions Ltd.
Md. Khosru Chowdhury	Managing Director, Nipa Fashion Wear Industry Ltd.
Faisal Samad	Director, Surma Garments Ltd.
Abdullah Hil Rakib	Managing Director, Brothers Fashion Limited
Haroon Ar Rashid	Managing Director, TRZ Garments Industry Ltd.
Navidul Huq	Managing Director, MG Knit Flair Ltd.
Rajiv Chowdhury	Managing Director, Young 4 Ever Textiles Ltd.
Barrister Vidiya Amrit Khan	Deputy Managing Director, Desh Garments Ltd.
Inamul Haq Khan (Bablu)	Managing Director, Ananta Garments Ltd.
Md. Imranur Rahman	Managing Director, Laila Styles Ltd.
Mijanur Rahman	Managing Director, Fabrica Knit Composite Ltd.
Md. Sajjadur Rahman Mridha (Shipon)	Chairman, Vintage Denim Studio Ltd.
Neela Hosna Ara	Chairman, Crony Fashions Ltd.
Md. M. Mohiuddin Chowdhury	Managing Director, Clifton Apparels Ltd.
Mohammed Abdus Salam	Managing Director, Chittagong Asian Apparels Ltd.
Tanvir Habib	Chairman, Legacy Fashion Ltd.
A.M. Shafiul Karim (Khokon)	Managing Director, A.S.R. Apparels Ltd.
Md. Hassan (Jacky)	Managing Director, Four H Apparels Ltd.
M. Ahsanul Hoq	Managing Director, Amheco Fabrics (Pvt.) Ltd.
Mohammed Meraj-E-Mostafa (Kaisar)	Managing Director, NLZ Fashion Ltd.
