= 2018 Bangladesh road-safety protests =

NISA Movement

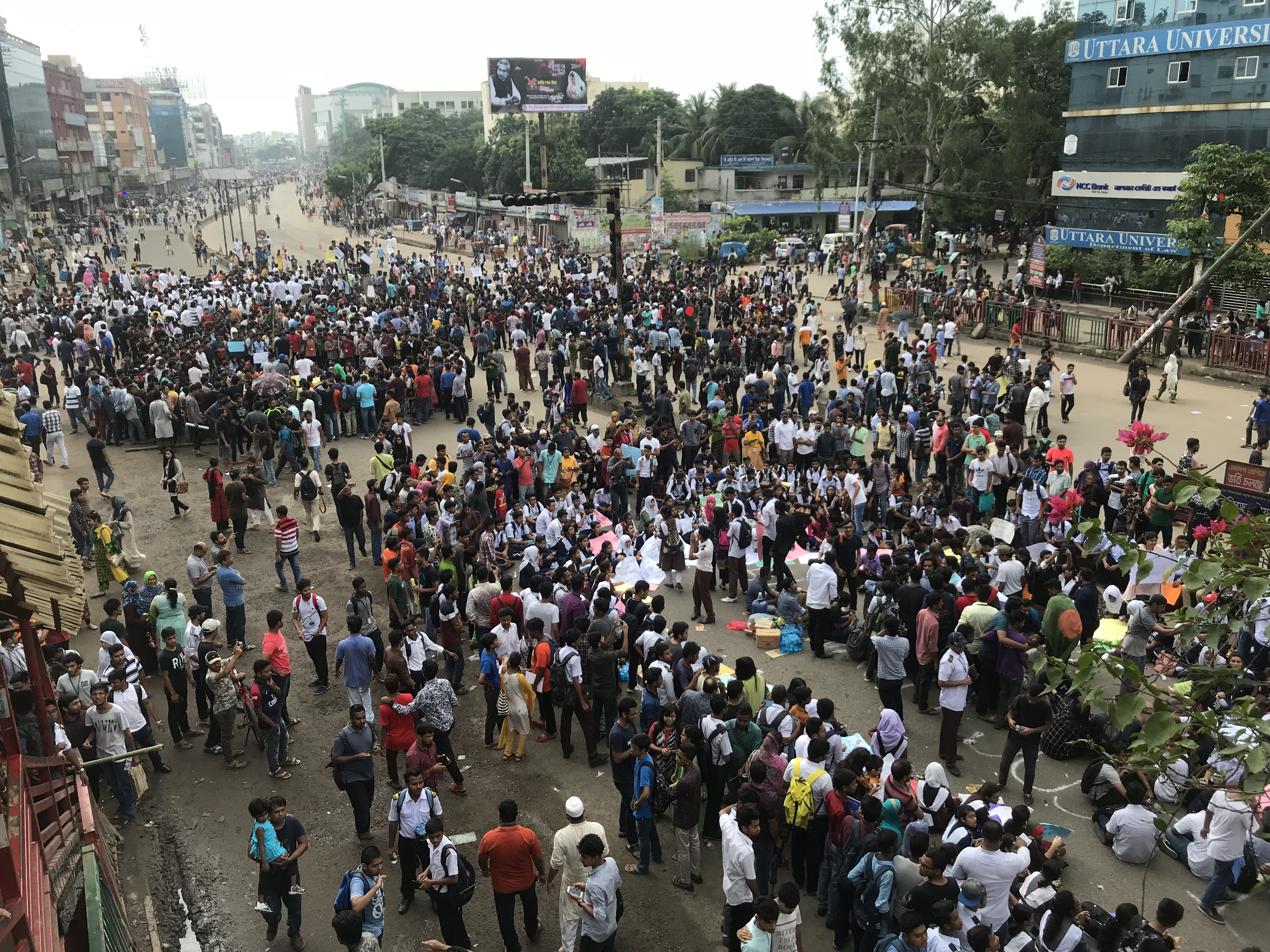
- Students blocking a road in Uttara, Dhaka, 2 August 2018
- Date: 29 July 2018 – 10 August 2018
- Location: Bangladesh
- Caused by: Two college students killed by negligent driver
- Goals: Ensurement of safe roads, formulation and implementation of road-safety laws, and punishment of drivers violating traffic laws
- Methods: Processions, road blockade, sit-ins, human chains, checking driving licence, controlling traffic on the road etc.
- Result: Formulation of a new road safety law by the government, announcement of traffic week, change in driver recruitment and payment schemes

Parties
(Bangladesh) Protestors: Private University Students Alliance of Bangladesh; Students of different educational institutions in Bangladesh; Journalists; Supported by BNP; Jamaat-E-Islami	Government of Bangladesh; Bangladesh Chhatra League; Bangladesh Road Transport Authority; Bangladesh Police; Bangladesh Road Transport Workers Federation

Casualties
- Injuries: 150

A series of public protests in Bangladesh advocating improved road safety were held from 29 July to 10 August 2018. They were sparked by the deaths of two high-school students in Dhaka struck by a bus operated by an unlicensed driver who was racing to collect passengers. The incident impelled students to demand safer roads and stricter traffic laws, and the demonstrations rapidly spread throughout Bangladesh.

The protests were peaceful until 2 August, when police attempted to disperse the demonstrators with tear gas, and people believed to be members of a pro-government youth league attacked protesters and journalists. The government arrested several protesters and a photographer for giving an interview about the protests to international media. Various international organisations and high-profile figures expressed solidarity with the protesters. The crack-down on the student protesters received high criticism both domestically and internationally.

The third Hasina ministry approved, on 6 August, a draft traffic act stipulating capital punishment for intentional killing and a maximum five-year prison sentence for accidental killing with a motor vehicle. The protesters felt that the maximum five-year sentence was too light for accidental deaths due to reckless driving. By 10 August, the situation in the city had returned to normal; most students had returned to their classes and traffic had resumed as normal, with many sources stating that the protests were finally over.

== Background ==
Bus services in Dhaka are notoriously unregulated and accident-prone. Although many traffic laws and regulations were passed by the parliament, they had not been put into action. Research by the National Committee to Protect Shipping, Roads and Railways showed that more than 4,200 people were killed and 16,100 others were injured in road accidents in Dhaka in 2017. It is estimated that approximately 2.4 million vehicles were being driven by unqualified drivers in Dhaka in 2018.

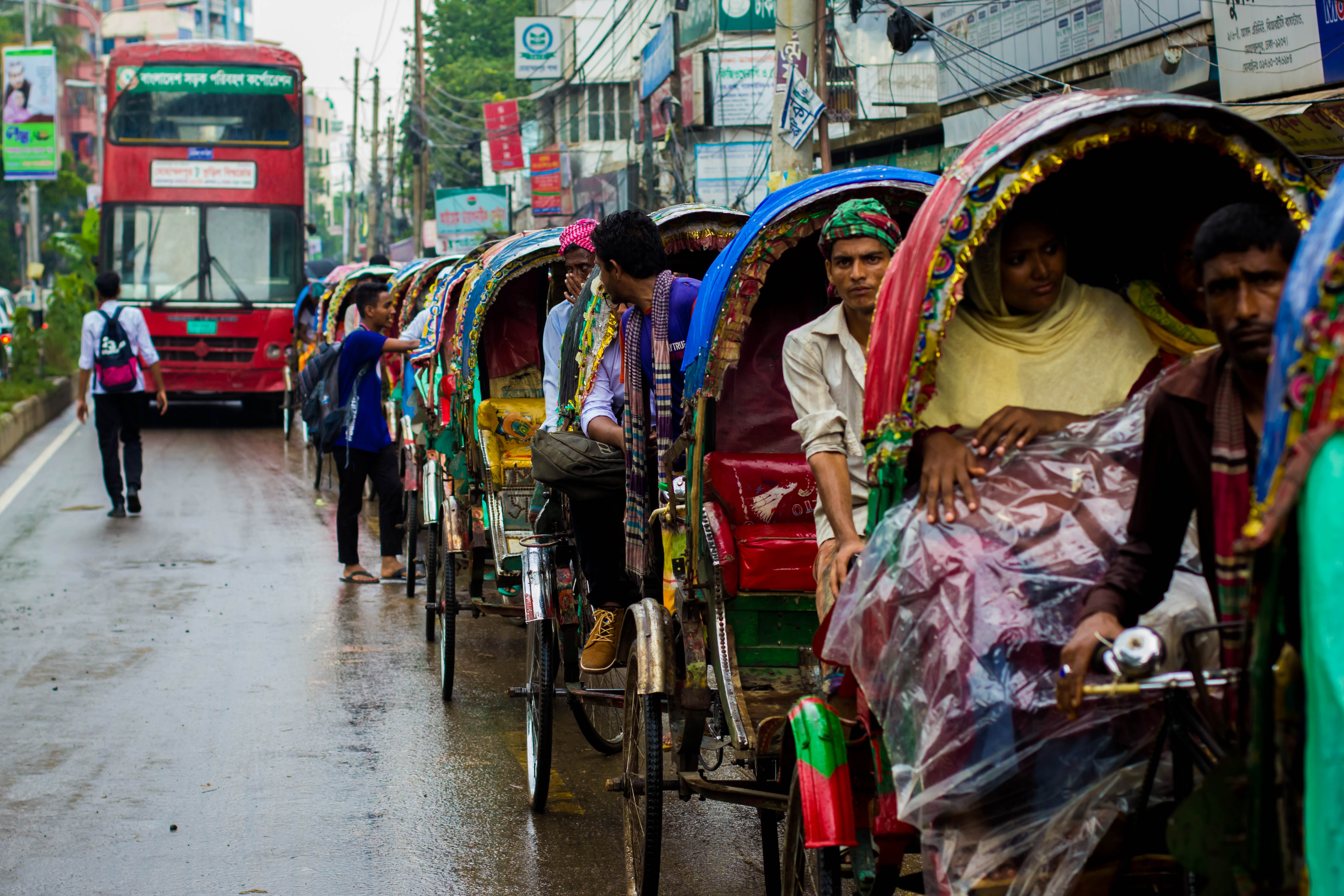
A road in Dhaka during the protests

== Protests ==
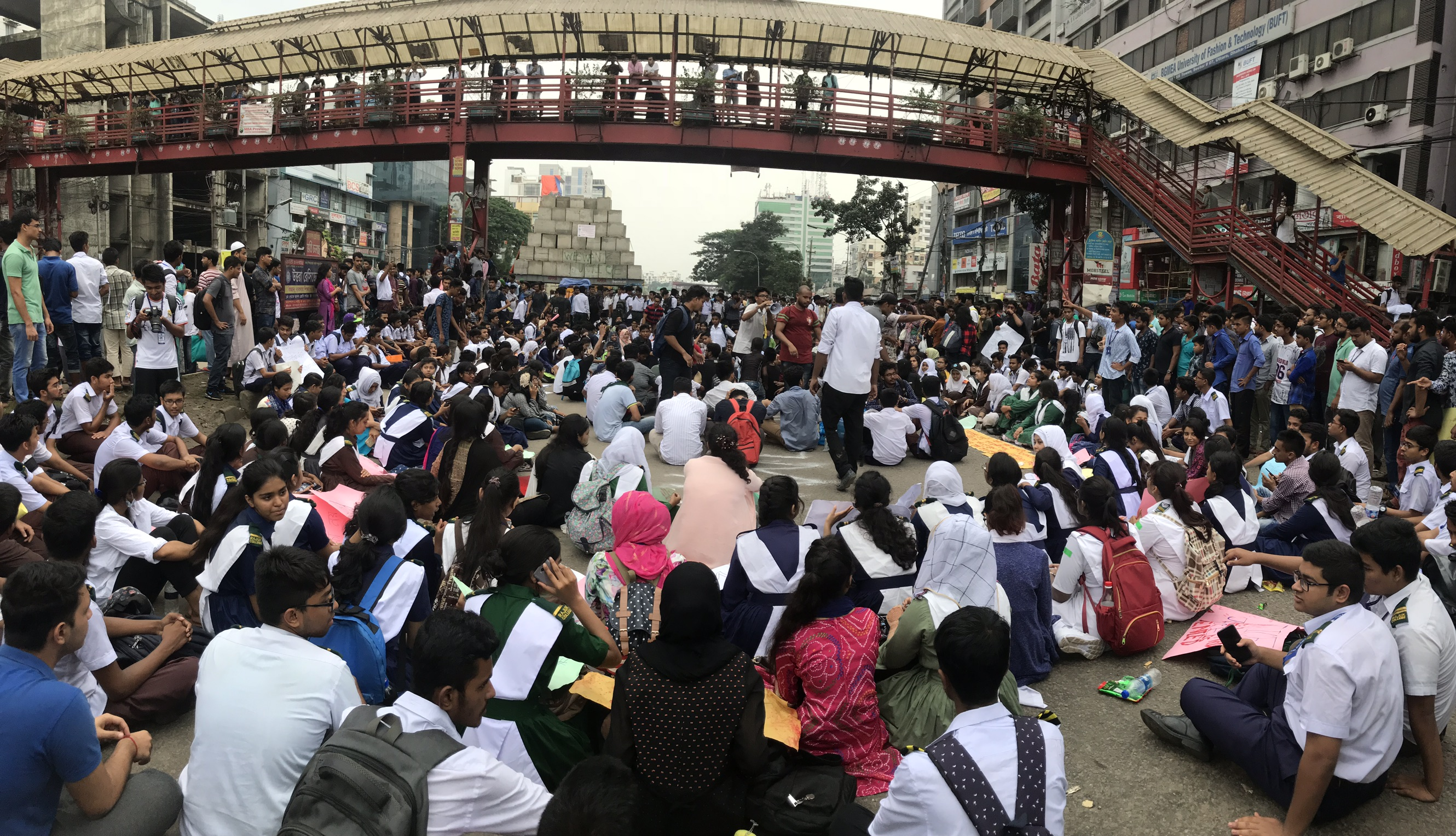
Students organise a sit-in to block roads

The protests started on 29 July 2018 after two students of Shaheed Ramiz Uddin Cantonment College were killed when a speeding bus ploughed into a bus stop on Airport Road, Dhaka. The vehicle had been racing another bus to pick up passengers when it drifted onto the sidewalk, killing the two and injuring 12 others. Hundreds of students poured into the streets demanding justice for the incident. The bus responsible for the crash was run by Jabal-e-Nur Paribahan and owned by Shahadat Hossain, who was later arrested. It was later revealed that three buses were involved in the incident. All three drivers were arrested, along with two assistants.

Hours later, journalists spoke with Shajahan Khan, Bangladeshi Minister of Shipping, who is also the Executive President of Bangladesh Road Transport Workers Federation, who said, "a road crash has claimed 33 lives in India's Maharashtra; but do they talk about it like the way we do?" His remark and smile were highly criticised by citizens and triggered protests in other areas of the country, and the protesters started demanding his apology.

The protests then spread outside Dhaka. The protesters, mostly students aged 15 to 19, blocked roads at major points and checked the legal documents and fitness certificates of different vehicles at different points throughout the country. The students declared 9 demands. Members of civil rights organisations expressed solidarity with protests. The protests continued for a fifth day despite the government's declaration that all educational institutions would remain closed countrywide on 2 August 2018.

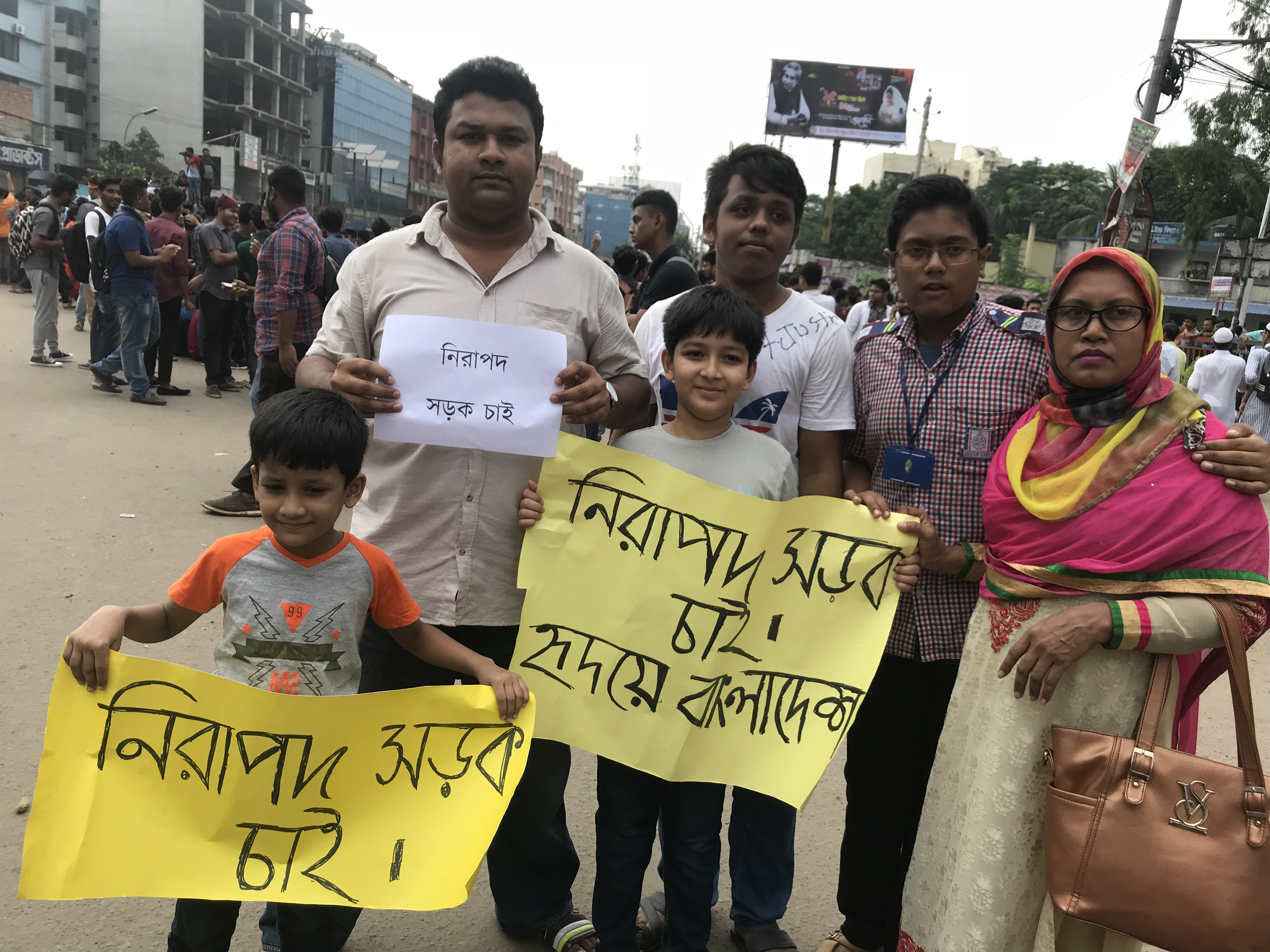
Bangladeshis of various age groups protesting for safe roads

Ilias Kanchan, a Bangladeshi film actor, road safety activist, and founder of the Nirapad Sarak Chai campaign, expressed solidarity with the protests by initiating a human chain in Dhaka on 3 August. On 5 August, Dhaka University students blocked Shahbag Square demanding Shajahan's apology, before proceeding to Science Lab Square, where police attempted to disperse them with tear gas. Dozens of students were injured, and several journalists were beaten up by pro-government activists.

On 6 August 2018, demonstrations were held in different parts of the country by students of the private and public universities. In Dhaka, police used tear gas and rubber bullets to disperse the protesters, and approximately 40 students were injured and 10 people were arrested from the nearby area of the private university campuses. On 7 August 2018, hundreds of journalists formed a large human chain outside the National Press Club, demanding punishment for attacks by BCL activists on journalists while covering the news of the protests, and also demanding punishment for attacks on the student protesters. Following the arrests of some of the student protesters, BRAC University students boycotted class on 8 August, demanding the release of the detained protesters, while Professor Abdul Mannan Choudhury, vice-chancellor of World University of Bangladesh, also asked the government to release the protesters. In retaliation to the arrest of protesters, Noakhali District's Noakhali University on 9 August announced its indefinite closure until all protesters were released.

== Retaliation and attacks on protesters and journalists ==
The student protesters and journalists collecting news of the protests were attacked by pro-government supporters alleged to be members of Bangladesh Chhatra League (BCL), the student wing of the ruling political party, injuring about 115 students and 15 journalists in Dhaka.

One local daily newspaper reported that three of its journalists were beaten and one female journalist was molested by BCL men while covering protests in the Jhigatola area of Dhaka on 4 August. Local journalists also reported having their camera equipment destroyed and phones snatched. They also alleged that they were forced to delete the videos of violence from their mobile phone.

Bangladesh Police fired tear gas and rubber bullets and used batons to disperse the protesters, leaving many people injured. The police and the road transport minister, Obaidul Quader, rejected all allegations of an attack on the protesters. One top leader of the ruling Bangladesh Awami League alleged that some criminals wearing school uniforms had joined the violence, but this was unconfirmed.

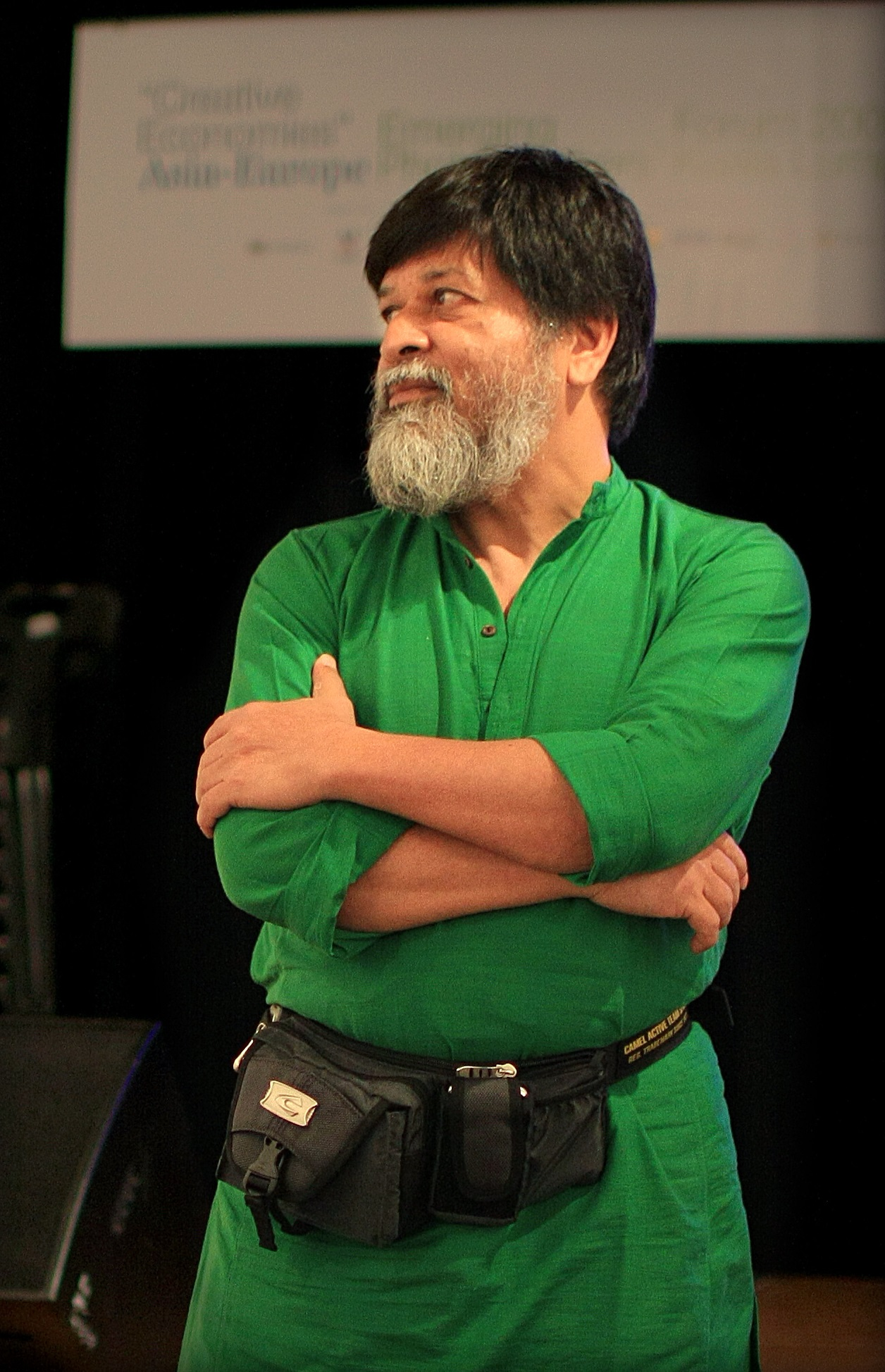
Photographer Shahidul Alam, founder of Drik Picture Library, was arrested for talking about the protests in an interview with Al Jazeera

Posts on social media alleged that four female students of Bir Shreshtha Noor Mohammad Public College were taken to a Bangladesh Awami League office and raped by BCL activists; however, these reports remain unconfirmed and have been denied by BCL leadership. Some of the alleged incidents, including rape, were later described as rumours that spread over social media.

On 4 August, a group of armed men riding motorcycles attacked an official car carrying Marcia Bernicat, the US ambassador to Bangladesh, although nobody was injured.

On 5 August, police used tear gas again to disperse thousands of school, college, and university students. Prime Minister Sheikh Hasina urged the protesters to go home and expressed concern that a "third party" could sabotage the protests and put the safety of students at risk. At least six photojournalists, including photojournalists of Associated Press, The Daily Bonik Barta, Janakantha, a photography student of Pathshala South Asian Media Institute, as well as freelance photojournalists, were attacked with iron rods, machetes, and sticks in Dhaka by activists of BCL. Law enforcement was present for the incident, but did not make any attempt to stop the attackers. The attackers tried to snatch the victims' cameras and phones, threatening to attack anyone who possessed a camera.

Following a live interview about the protests with Al Jazeera, photographer Shahidul Alam was detained by a group of between 30 and 35 plainclothes police officers on 5 August. Alam was charged under Section 57 of the Information and Communication Technology Act and was remanded for seven days. He told the court that he had been tortured while in police custody. The Supreme Court halted the seven-day remand on 7 August, and after observing his physical condition, ordered authorities to admit him to a hospital. Alam was taken to a hospital on 8 August at 9 am. However, Alam was taken back to the office of the Detective Branch of police again at 2 pm on the same day.

Five more people were detained by the Bangladesh Police, including Mahabubur Rahaman Arman, a human rights activist, and cybersecurity and crime analyst who was charged under Section 57 of the Information and Communication Technology Act and was remanded for six days. Others were remanded for 3–5 days in the same Act during that time.

On 6 August, East West University students who had blocked the road in front of the university in late morning protests were attacked by a group of men carrying sticks. Local residents stated that activists from the Shecchashebok League, a wing of the ruling party, were among the attackers. Police also fired tear gas shells to disperse the protesters. Prothom Alo correspondent Nasrin Akhtar Shumi, who recorded the violence on her phone, had her phone snatched away by the police, who took her to the local police outpost and erased the video recording. Police were also alleged to have sought assistance from pro-government youths to deal with the protesters.

Relatives of the protesters expressed their dismay when 22 private university students involved in the protests were detained by the police on 7 August, but no legal action was taken on the alleged ruling party activists who attacked the protesters. On 8 August, police raided the Bashundhara Residential Area in Dhaka, where a number of private university students reside, but no one was arrested during the operation.

On 9 August, Dhaka University authority handed over one of their student to police with the assistance of pro-government youth league BCL for his Facebook posts.

On 10 August, Shaidul Alam was accused of having been an initiator of the violence. One protester was reported to have lost his eyesight. No further incidents related to the protests have been reported since.

== Official response ==
Although no official statement was published by the Prime Minister Sheikh Hasina, Home Minister Asaduzzaman Khan Kamal said at a press briefing on 2 August that the prime minister had requested students to stop protesting on the streets and return to their schools. The Ministry of Education advised all educational institutions to remain closed on 2 August in order to control the ongoing wave of student agitation. Education Minister Nurul Islam Nahid said that this decision was taken based on security concerns. The Cyber Crime Unit of Dhaka Metropolitan Police filed cases against 29 individuals and online news portals for sharing news and media related to the protests at the Ramna Police Station. Private television channel Ekattor TV was issued a letter of warning by the Information Ministry after it aired footage of student protests on national television.

On 3 August, the government donated a savings certificate of 2 million BDT to each of the families of the students who died in the bus accident.

On 4 August, the government blocked mobile internet access for 24 hours in response to supposed misinformation circulating online. Internet service providers were ordered to reduce the mobile internet speed to 1.28 kbit/s to prevent the uploading of pictures or videos to the internet. Home Minister Asaduzzaman Khan announced that police would take "tough action" against the agitating students "if limit is crossed [sic?]".

On 5 August, 3G and 4G cellular networks were again reportedly blocked by authorities in an attempt to control the mass spread of misinformation online, resulting in a temporary communication black-out.

On 6 August, a new traffic act was approved at a cabinet meeting, proposing capital punishment for intentional killing and five years in prison for accidental killing with a motor vehicle.

Bus owners took the decision to put contract drivers on monthly payroll. They commented, "The drivers move recklessly so that they can earn extra on an additional trip when they can. If they get a monthly salary, their mentality of rash driving will change." The announcement came on 8 August and had been set to be enforced from 1 September 2018.

== Police response ==
In response to the protests, national authorities launched "Traffic Week", a week-long road-safety program. On its first day, 5 August, 19,366 cases were filed for traffic rule violators, with 25,882 more recorded the following day.

Bangladesh police filed 34 cases against protesters and arrested at least 37 of them. No charges were filed against the attackers over attacks on protesters and journalists. Photographer Shahidul Alam was detained for interrogation and remanded by police due to his social media activity on the protest; Amnesty International condemned the arrest.

According to an official in the cybercrime division of the Dhaka Metropolitan Police, up to 1,200 social media accounts have been identified to allegedly spread rumours. In addition to police officers, members of the pro-government youth league BCL also asked followers to send examples of anyone allegedly spreading rumours. Posts featuring the names and pictures of alleged activists, including four women, were spread across Facebook and Instagram. These actions have made many students in Dhaka panic and made them stop posting about the protests online. There are also reports of terrified students deleting their online messages of support for the protests.

Dhaka Metropolitan Police (DMP) scrutinised over 1,500 profiles on different social media and launched legal action against 150 such profile holders for their alleged involvement in instigating anarchy during the movement.

== International response ==
The United Nations expressed concern for the safety of Bangladeshi children and young people in the protests. The US Embassy in Dhaka issued a statement condemning the actions taken against the student protesters. London-based Save the Children urged the government to meet the demands of the students and to ensure the safety of the protesting students. Amnesty International also released a statement, calling for the release of activist and photographer Shahidul Alam and for an end to the crackdown on student protesters. Similarly, PEN International issued a statement demanding the immediate release of the photographer. Indian writer Arundhati Roy, Canadian author Naomi Klein, American writer and philosopher Noam Chomsky, and Indian intellectual Vijay Prashad also demanded the immediate release of photographer Shahidul Alam in a joint statement. RSF urged the government to protect those involved in the freedom of the press. Swedish Foreign Affairs Minister Margot Wallström voiced her concern regarding the violent scenes witnessed in Dhaka and called for the respect of the right to peacefully protest. The European Union also expressed concern over the attacks on students and journalists. New York-based Human Rights Watch criticised the Bangladesh government for "unlawfully attacking" student protesters and locking up people for "peaceful criticism".

== Injured journalists and photographers ==
- A. M. Ahad, photojournalist at Associated Press
- Ahmed Deepto, staff reporter at Prothom Alo

== In popular culture ==
A film titled Bikkhov starring Shanto Khan and Srabanti Chatterjee, has been made based on the event.

== See also ==
- 2024 Bangladesh quota reform movement
- 2018 Bangladesh quota reform movement
- 2015 Bangladesh student protests
- 1952 Bengali language movement
- 2020 Bangladesh protests
- Politics of Bangladesh
- 2018-2019 Bangladesh protests
