= Soto Monir =

Bangladeshi politician

- ছোট মনির
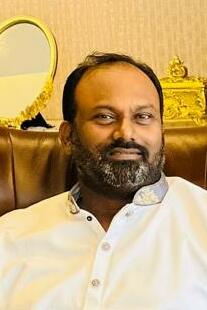
- Monir at his Tangail residence (2022)

Member of the Bangladesh Parliament for Tangail-2
- In office 30 December 2018 – 6 August 2024
- Preceded by: Khandaker Asaduzzaman

Personal details
- Born: Tanvir Hasan; 27 May 1978 (age 47) Tangail, Bangladesh
- Party: Bangladesh Awami League
- Spouse: Oaishe Khan
- Relations: Shajahan Khan (father-in-law)
- Occupation: Politician

Soto Monir (born 27 May 1978) is a Bangladesh Awami League politician and a former 2-time Jatiya Sangsad member representing the Tangail-2 constituency. He was the joint secretary of Awami League's branch in Germany.

== Career ==
Monir entered student politics as a member of the Chhatra League in the early 1990s. However, he left Bangladesh in 1996 for Moscow University in Russia. He then moved to Germany, and served as the joint-secretary of the Awami League's branch of the central European country. He came back to Bangladesh during 2006-08 Bangladeshi political unrest.

Monir was elected to Jatiya Sangsad from the Tangail-2 constituency as a Awami League candidate at the 2018 Bangladeshi general election. He was accused of NID forgery, and arms trafficking, however the allegations were never proven and referred as "politically motivated conspiracy" by Monir's associates.

Monir serves as the joint-general secretary of the Tangail District Awami League, he previously served as the secretary of science and technology of the Tangail district committee of the Bangladesh Awami League. He is also the chairperson of Tangail's branch of the Bangladesh Road Transport Workers Federation.

Monir was a member of the Parliamentary Standing Committee on the Ministry of Fisheries and Livestock in the 11th National Parliament of Bangladesh.

== Personal life ==
Monir is married to Oaishe Khan (Nishe), the only daughter of Shajahan Khan, a former shipping minister, current presidium member of the Bangladesh Awami League and the eight-time Madaripur-2 MP.
