= JSF =

JSF may refer to:

- JavaServer Faces (now Jakarta Faces), a specification for building web application user interfaces
- Jabber Software Foundation, now the XMPP Standards Foundation
- Japan Skating Federation, the national body for ice skating in Japan
- Joint Strike Fighter program, a military aircraft acquisition program which began in the 1990s
  - F-35 JSF, alternative name of the resulting Lockheed Martin F-35 Lightning II
- United States Joint Strike Force, a faction in the video game Tom Clancy's EndWar
- Joint Strike Fighter (video game)
- Jatio Sramik Federation, a trade union federation in Bangladesh
- Jeux sans frontières, a European-wide television game show
- Jonathan Safran Foer (born 1977), American author
- Junior Songfestival, a Dutch televised song competition
