= Jahander Ali Miah =

Bangladeshi politician

- জাহান্দার আলী মিয়া

Member of the Bangladesh Parliament for Madaripur-2
- Incumbent
- Assumed office 17 February 2026
- Preceded by: Shajahan Khan

Personal details
- Born: 20 April 1962 (age 64) Madaripur Sadar Upazila, Madaripur District
- Party: Bangladesh Nationalist Party

Jahander Ali Miah is a Bangladeshi politician of the Bangladesh Nationalist Party. He is currently serving as a member of parliament from Madaripur-2 .

== Early life ==
Jahander Ali Miah was born on 20 April in 1962 at Madaripur Sadar Upazila under Madaripur District.
