= Faridpur-12 =

Defunct parliamentary constituency in Bangladesh

Faridpur-12 was a parliamentary constituency in Bangladesh for the Jatiya Sangsad (National Parliament), located in Faridpur District.

== History ==
In the 1970 provincial elections, the Awami League nominated Satish Chandra Halder as its candidate from Faridpur-12, and he won by a significant margin.

In the first general elections of independent Bangladesh in 1973, Santosh Kumar Biswas was nominated by the Bangladesh Awami League and won the election. The constituency was abolished in 1984.

== Elected Members of Parliament ==
Election	Member	Party
1970	Satish Chandra Halder	Awami League
1973	Santosh Kumar Biswas	Awami League
1979	Qazi Mahabub Ahmed	Bangladesh Nationalist Party
Constituency Abolished
