= Syed Golam Kibria =

Bangladeshi journalist and politician

- সৈয়দ গোলাম কিবরিয়া
- Born: January 17, 1933; Madaripur, Faridpur, British India
- Died: May 31, 1996; Dhaka, Bangladesh
- Resting place: Gournadi, Barisal, Bangladesh
- Occupations: Journalist; Politician
- Known for: Language movement
- Children: Rokeya; Nannu; Bipu; Shathi; Shadhin; Bithi; Tithi
- Relatives: Shajahan Khan (son-in-law); Soto Monir (grandson-in-law)
- Awards: Ekushey Padak

Syed Golam Kibria (died on May 31, 1996) was a Bangladeshi journalist and politician. He was awarded Ekushey Padak in 2016 by the Government of Bangladesh.

== Career and personal life ==
Kibria was a Language-movement activist in 1952, for which he was posthumously awarded Ekushey Padak, the second highest civilian award in Bangladesh, at 2016.

Kibria served as the acting editor of the Daily Azad and Daily Bhorer Kagoj.

Kibria was the father-in-law of Bangladeshi minister and Awami League politician Shajahan Khan. He was also the grandfather-in-law of Bangladesh Awami League MP Soto Monir.

Kibria died at 1996, he left behind a wife, 4 daughters and 3 sons.
