= Musfiq Mannan Choudhury =

Musfiq Mannan Choudhury is a professor of Business and Information Systems at the University of Dhaka. He is now also appointed as Commissioner of Finance, Accounts, and Revenue of the Bangladesh Telecommunication Regulatory Commission. He was a member of the Board of Governors of the Pioneer Dental College and member of the Board of Trustees of the World University of Bangladesh. He has taught in several universities in Bangladesh and in England.

== Early life ==
Choudhury's father, is Professor Abdul Mannan Choudhury, who was also a professor of Management Information Systems at the University of Dhaka and presently the Vice-Chancellor of World University of Bangladesh. He did his bachelor's degree in management studies and masters in human resource management at the University of Dhaka in 1998 and 1999 respectively. He did his PhD at Durham University in 2008 in electronic commerce.

Choudhury grew up in West Africa and was a student of the Bayero University Kano Staff School in the early 80s

== Career ==
Choudhury was a Research Fellow in Digital Marketing at the University of Southampton from 1 September 2011 to 1 March 2014. While working there, he was also included in the prototype building of the Boeing 737 max Rolls Royce Engine. Choudhury has around six (6) MPhil/PhD students enrolled with him. He has published 21 research papers in top ranking journals. In terms of innovation, he has developed an ERP which can streamline processes in higher education making institutes run effectively and smoothly.

Choudhury was the secretary of World University of Bangladesh in 2015.

In 2019, Choudhury was the acting chairman of World University of Bangladesh. He oversaw the inauguration of the permanent campus of the World University of Bangladesh in Sector-17, Uttara. He is the director of Center for Development and Institutional Studies at the University of Dhaka. While working in Dhaka University, he was the deputy director of Center for Development and Institutional Studies at the University of Dhaka.

Choudhury was appointed Commissioner of Bangladesh Telecommunication Regulatory Commission in December 2022. He oversaw the audit of TeleTalk by BTRC. In October 2023, he gave the keynote speech on Cyber security challenges for developing nations at the Cyber Security Awareness Day 2023 at Daffodil International University.
