= Shajahan Khan =

Bangladeshi Politician

- শাজাহান খান
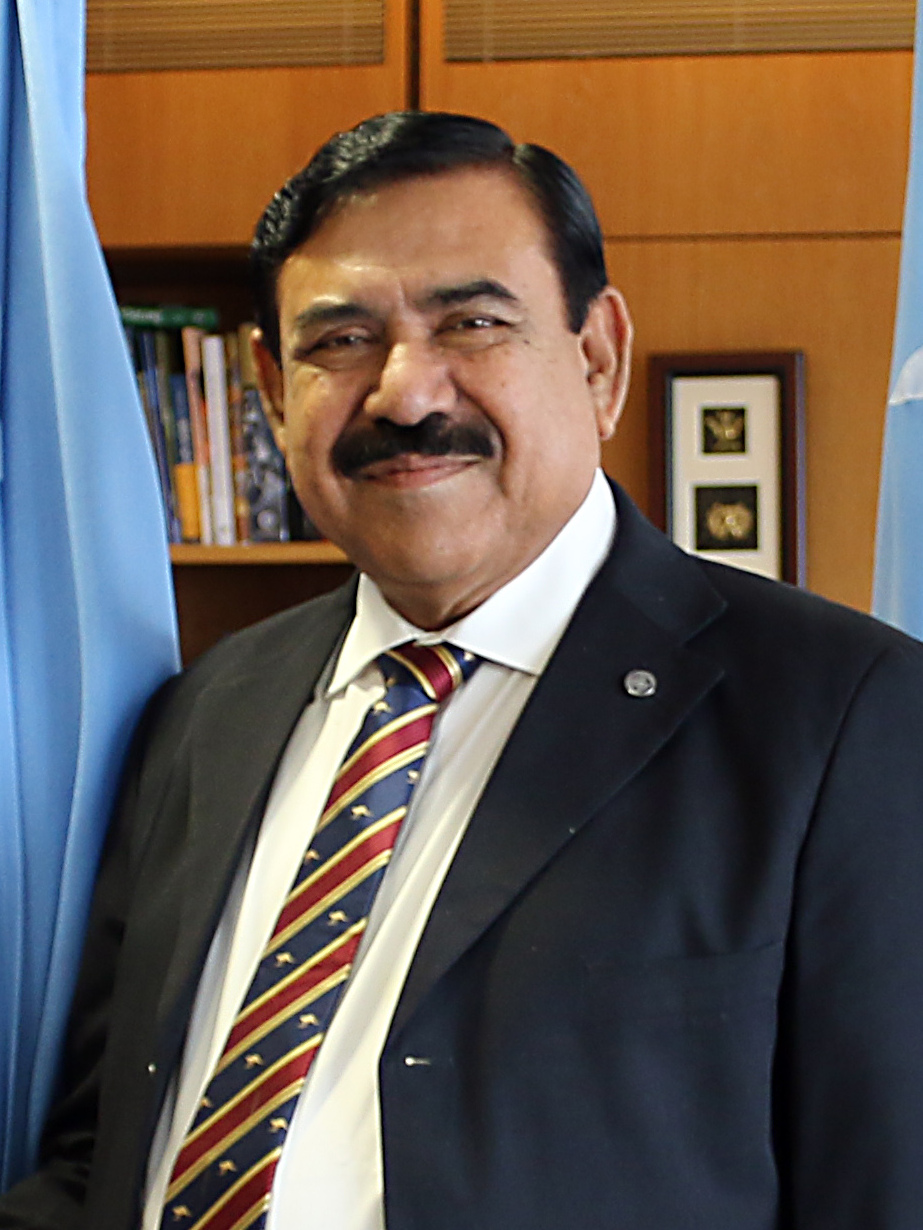
- Khan in London (2017)

Member of the Bangladesh Parliament for Madaripur-2
- In office 14 July 1996 – 6 August 2024
- Preceded by: Qazi Mahabub Ahmed
- In office September 1991 – 24 November 1995
- Preceded by: Sirajul Islam Bhuiyan
- In office 10 July 1986 – 6 December 1987
- Preceded by: Position created

Minister of Shipping
- In office 31 July 2009 – 7 January 2019
- Prime Minister: Sheikh Hasina
- Preceded by: Akbar Hossain
- Succeeded by: Khalid Mahmud Chowdhury

Minister of Liberation War Affairs
- In office 21 November 2013 – 5 January 2014
- Preceded by: AB Tajul Islam
- Succeeded by: Mozammel Haque

Personal details
- Born: 1 January 1952 (age 74) Madaripur, East Bengal, Pakistan
- Party: Bangladesh Awami League
- Other political affiliations: Jatiyo Samajtantrik Dal (1973 - 1989)
- Relations: Syed Golam Kibria (father-in-law); Soto Monir (son-in-law)
- Parent: Asmat Ali Khan (father)
- Occupation: Politician

Shajahan Khan (born 1 January 1952) is a Bangladeshi politician and a former Jatiya Sangsad member representing the Madaripur-2 constituency for 8 terms during 1986–2024. He served as the minister of shipping during 2009–2019. He was announced as a presidium member of Awami League in 2019.

Khan is a freedom fighter, having fought in 1971 Liberation War as a member of Mukti Bahini. He was the chairman of the parliamentary committee of the Ministry of Liberation War Affairs at the 11th national parliament of Bangladesh.

== Early life ==
Khan was born on 1 January 1952 to Asmat Ali Khan, a Jatiya Sangsad member, politician and educationist, and Tajan Nesa Begum. He passed the S.S.C examination from United Islamia High School, Madaripur in 1966 and H.S.C from Madaripur Nazimuddin College in 1968. He obtained his bachelor's degree from Government Nazimuddin College.

== Career ==
Khan joined politics in 1964. He was elected as the secretary of Chhatra League in Madaripur subdivision. Later he was elected as the secretary general (1966–67) and vice-president (1968–69) of Govt. Nazimuddin College. He was a Mukti Bahini soldier, of Mujib Bahini section. He received military training in Dehradun, India.

Khan is a presidium member of Awami League, and the ex-president of Bangladesh Road Transport Workers Federation.

Khan was a 8-time elected MP. He was first elected to the Bangladesh Parliament in 1986, as the MP of Madaripur-2 constituency as an individual candidate. He has been elected as an MP for the same seat as the nominee of the Awami League through the 1991, 1996, 2001, 2008, 2014, 2018 and 2024 election seasons.

On 31 July 2009, Khan was appointed as Minister of Shipping. In November 2013, he was appointed in the interim government as the Minister of Liberation War affairs. Following the election of 2014, he left that ministry and took up the responsibility of the Ministry of Shipping and held the office until January 2019.

Khan served as the chairman of the standing committee of Ministry of Liberation War Affairs.

=== Controversy ===
On 23 August 2011, transport workers loyal to Khan snatched newspapers from hawkers and transport vehicles because the newspapers criticized the role Khan played in granting driving licenses. He has been criticised for defending drivers violating traffic laws. As the minister of shipping, he defended chief engineer of the Department of Shipping AKM Fakhrul Islam and protected him from departmental action. Islam was arrested on 11 August 2017 by the Anti-Corruption Commission with half a million taka in bribe. He has supported CBA leaders at Bangladesh Bank, worrying officers at the bank. He was criticised over the recruitment at Chittagong port by government MP Moin Uddin Khan Badal and opposition party MP Ziauddin Ahmed Bablu.

On 29 July 2018, Khan was criticized for commenting lightheartedly with a smile about a road accident which led to the death of two students. Following his remark, countrywide protests and road blockades were held by the students

=== Aftermath of Hasina's Resignation ===
On 6 September 2024, following the July Revolution, Shajahan Khan was arrested from his residence. Khan suffered a heart attack in prison and he was hospitalised on 4 November 2024 citing chest pain.

== Personal life ==
Khan has been married to Syeda Rokeya Begum, daughter of Ekushey Padak winning journalist Syed Golam Kibria. The couple has two sons and a daughter. The eldest, Ashibur Rahman Khan, was the Upazila Chairman of Madaripur and a central committee member of Awami Jubo League. His daughter Oaishe Khan is married to Tangail-2 MP Tanvir Hasan Soto Monir.
