= 2018–2019 Bangladesh protests =

The 2018–2019 Bangladesh protests, also known as the Bangladeshi Social Revolution, was a series of public social unrest and Strike actions by Garment workers and Trade unions against low wages and high unemployment and demanded the resignation of the government. Over 50,000 protesters participated in the nonviolent movement. Anti-wages and anti-fee hike demonstrations loomed in Factories and Company buildings in Ashulia and Rajshahi, where most protesters staged their protest and sit-ins. Dhaka and other minor areas with factories experienced massive increasingly violent and severe street demonstrations while growing street opposition. Civil disobedience and massive labour unrest rocked the country as Garment workers and Farmers demonstrated nationwide against the results of the 2018 Bangladeshi general election, the ousting and sacking of workers in Factories, harsh working conditions and deteriorating wage conditions. Police brutality and deadly clashes was met at protest movement sites and many people were killed in the strikes and Nonviolent resistance and Civil resistance movement at towns and regions nationwide. The protests was suppressed by the military on 13 January, 2019 after a wave of crackdowns for 7 days and clampdowns on the 2018 Bangladesh election violence. The result of the massive movement was mobs were arrested and 1500+ workers are sacked.

== See also ==
- 2018 Bangladesh road-safety protests
- 2023 Bangladesh garment workers strike
- 2018 Bangladesh quota reform movement
- 2010 Bangladeshi protests
