= Asmat Ali Khan =

Bangladeshi politician

Moulavi Asmat Ali Khan
- আছমত আলী খান

1954 East Bengali legislative election
- In office 3 April 1954 – 1958
- Leader: A. K. Fazlul Huq

Member of the Bangladesh Parliament for Faridpur-14
- In office 7 March 1973 – 1978

Personal details
- Born: 1907 British India
- Died: 21 October 1993 (aged 85–86) Dhaka, Bangladesh
- Resting place: Madaripur, Bangladesh
- Party: Awami League
- Spouse: Tajan Nesa Begum
- Children: Shajahan Khan
- Profession: Politician, educationist, social worker and lawyer
- Awards: Swadhinata Padak

Moulavi Asmat Ali Khan was a Bangladeshi lawyer, politician, educationist, and social worker. Asmat Ali Khan was elected a member of parliament in 1973. He was a close ally of Sheikh Mujibur Rahman. In 2016 a bridge was opened under his name. In 1953 he started a school in his community.

== Early life ==
Moulavi Asmat Ali Khan was born in 1907 in British India (now Bangladesh). He graduated in law at a very early age and started social work. His son, Shahjahan Khan, is a government minister.

== Career ==
Khan was elected as an M.L.A. in 1954 during the East Bengal elections. In 1970, he was elected M.P.A. In 1973, Khan was elected the first member of parliament from Faridpur-14 (vote area number 214), Madaripur). He was also the founding member and president of Madaripur Awami League. In 2016, he received the Swadhinata Padak.
