= Santosh Kumar Biswas =

Bangladeshi politician

Member of Bangladesh Parliament
- In office 1973–1976

Personal details
- Political party: Awami League

Santosh Kumar Biswas (Bengali: সন্তোষ কুমার বিশ্বাস) is a Awami League politician in Bangladesh and a former member of parliament for Faridpur-12.

== Career ==
Biswas was elected to parliament from Faridpur-12 as an Awami League candidate in 1973.
