= 2010 Bangladeshi protests =

Garment worker's demonstrations

The 2010 Bangladeshi protests is a wave of garment worker's demonstrations and strikes across Bangladesh that began on 19 June, when hundreds of workers took to the streets for an 8-day strike over wages and low salaries in Ashulia and lasted for 11 days, smashing windows and burning tyres and trucks. Violent protests and street demonstrations occurred again on 30 July, when thousands rioted against low wages. 15,000 took part in the rioting and demonstrations and was mainly beaten and arrested, including 10 children. On 16 August, protesters again marched and held rallies over low pay for workers, 21 were arrested and in Dhaka, demonstrators clashed with the security forces.

== See also ==
- 2018-2019 Bangladesh protests
