= 2020 Bangladesh protests =

The 2020 Bangladeshi protests were protests by hundreds of thousands of protesters against France, government mishandling of the COVID-19 pandemic and rape. Protests in Bangladesh erupted on 7 October after a video of a group of men attacking, stripping, and assaulting a woman went viral, Human Rights Watch said. Protesters called for the resignation of Home Minister Asaduzzaman Khan Kamal over the government's failure to address an alarming rise violence against women and girls. Rape protests continued and demonstrators threatened to escalate the protests. Demonstrations by schoolgirls took place on 11 October and soon, police tried to break up the protests with water cannons. At the end of the month and in November, tens of thousands of protesters marched daily against the regime of Emmanuel Macron and his discrimination of Islam. The protesters burned pictures of Emmanuel Macron and Charlie Hebdo and used slippers at police. Police opened fire on demonstrators and one death was reported and soon, Clashes broke out by November. After violence, protests turned peaceful and men dominated demonstrations. The protests ended on 3 November.

== See also ==
- 2018 Bangladesh road-safety protests
- Islamophobia in France
