= 2015 Bangladesh student protests against VAT on education =

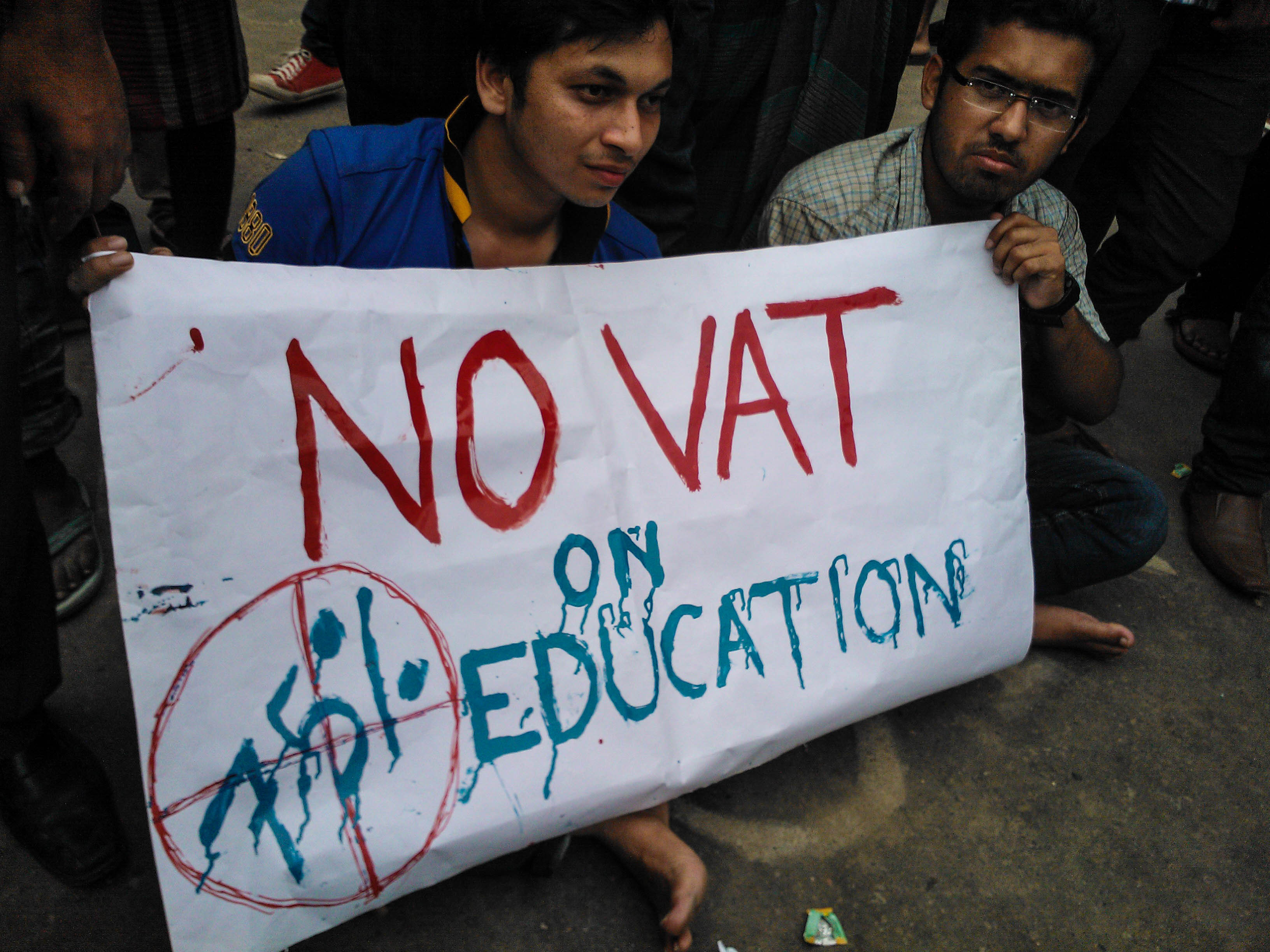
Students holding a "No VAT on education" placard.

The 2015 Bangladesh student protests on "No VAT on Education" were protests by students of private universities in Bangladesh demanding the VAT imposed on higher education in private universities be eliminated. The present Finance Minister of the Bangladesh Awami League government first introduced a 10% VAT upon higher education in private universities in the draft of budget of 2015–16. Following strong opposition, the VAT was reduced to 7.5%. The imposed VAT was withdrawn by the finance division after a cabinet meeting on 14 September 2015.

== History ==
Previous government tried to impose similar VAT on private university tuition fee in 2010, but had to revoke their decision as students protested strongly.

== Protests ==
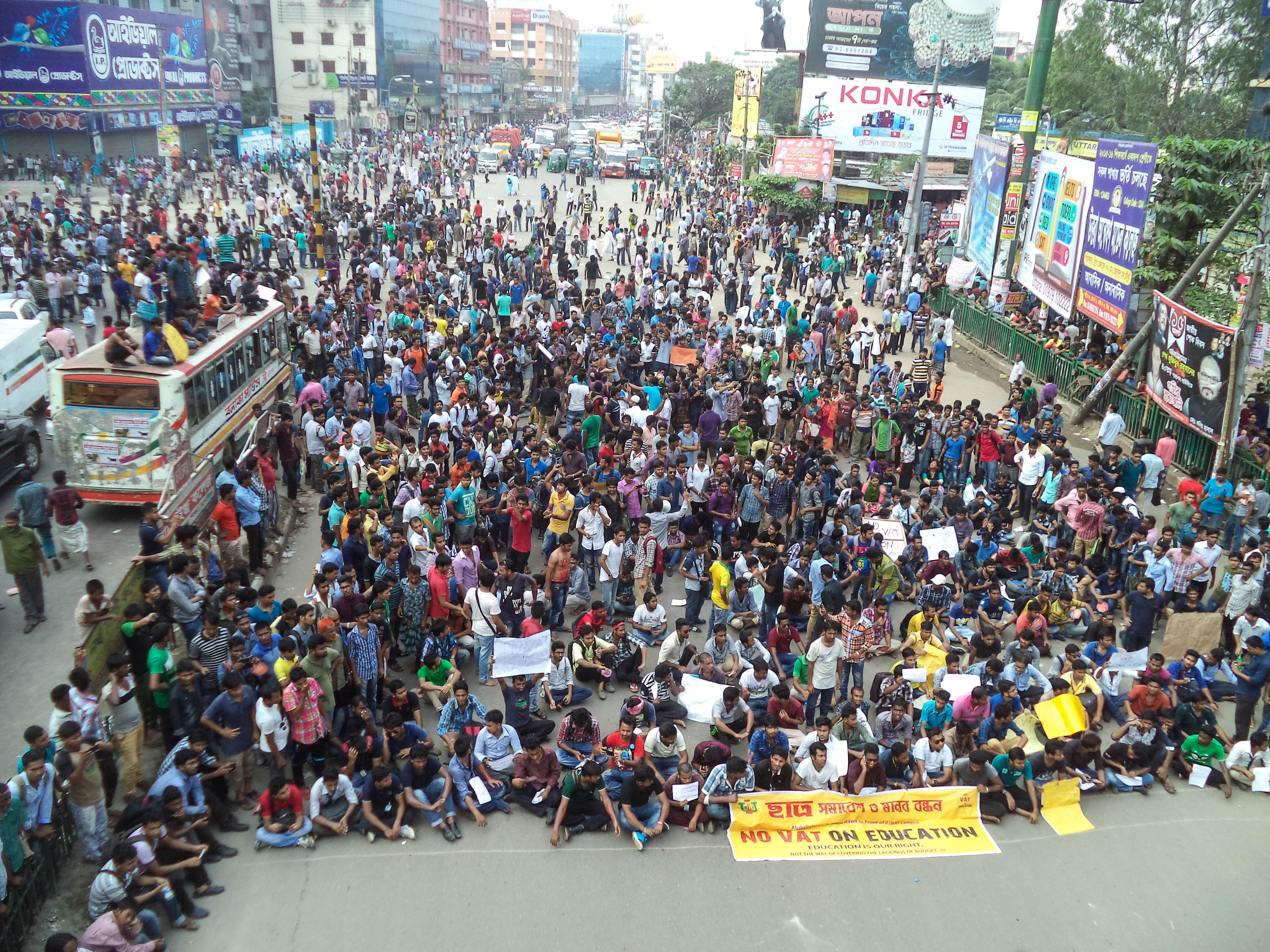
Private university students in Uttara, Dhaka protest VAT on tuition fees.

On 22 June, law enforcement authorities foiled a procession of private university students heading for the finance ministry building to press home their demands.

At the start of August 2015 the government announced they would not withdraw the VAT and that students must pay it. The news sparked outrage among students. On 9 September, police opened fire on a protest by the students of East West University. This caused outrage and immediate support for the cause by thousands of other students from different universities. On 10 September, road blockades were carried out by students from different private universities to protest the VAT on tuition fees. The protest was sparked by controversial statements by the minister of finance, Abul Maal Abdul Muhith but he stood firm on the decision for the VAT to stay. The government also issued a circular stating the VAT was only imposed on the private university authorities and the students need not pay.

== Incidents ==
There were two notable incident. First one happened at Dhanmondi 27, private universities students were attacked two times in a row and the second one happened at Banani-Kakoli Square on 14 September.

== Result ==
On 14 September 2015 at a regular cabinet meeting directed by prime minister Sheikh Hasina, the Finance division decided to withdraw the VAT imposed on tuition fees.

== Gallery ==
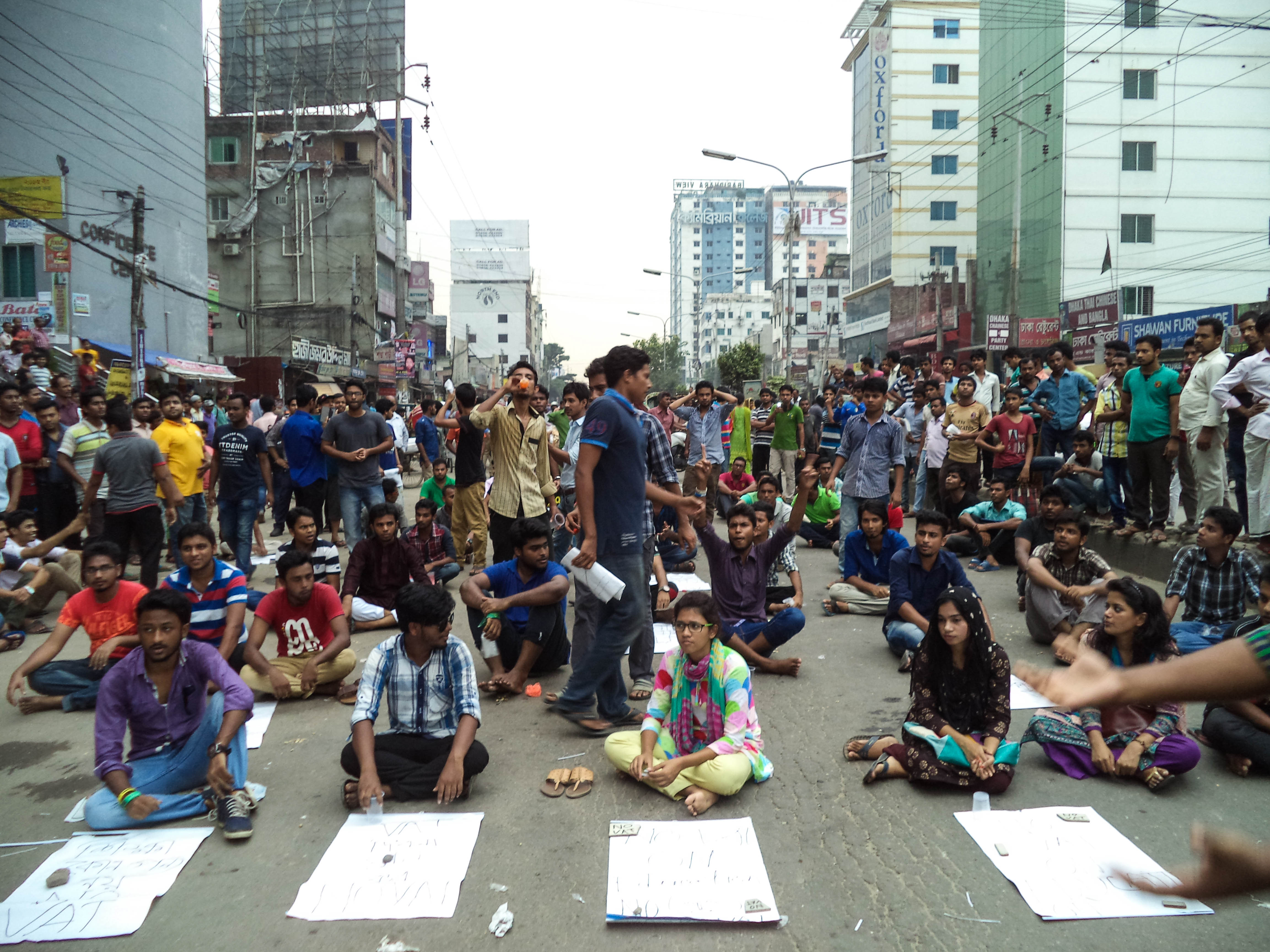
Students in Badda, Dhaka protest VAT on tuition fees

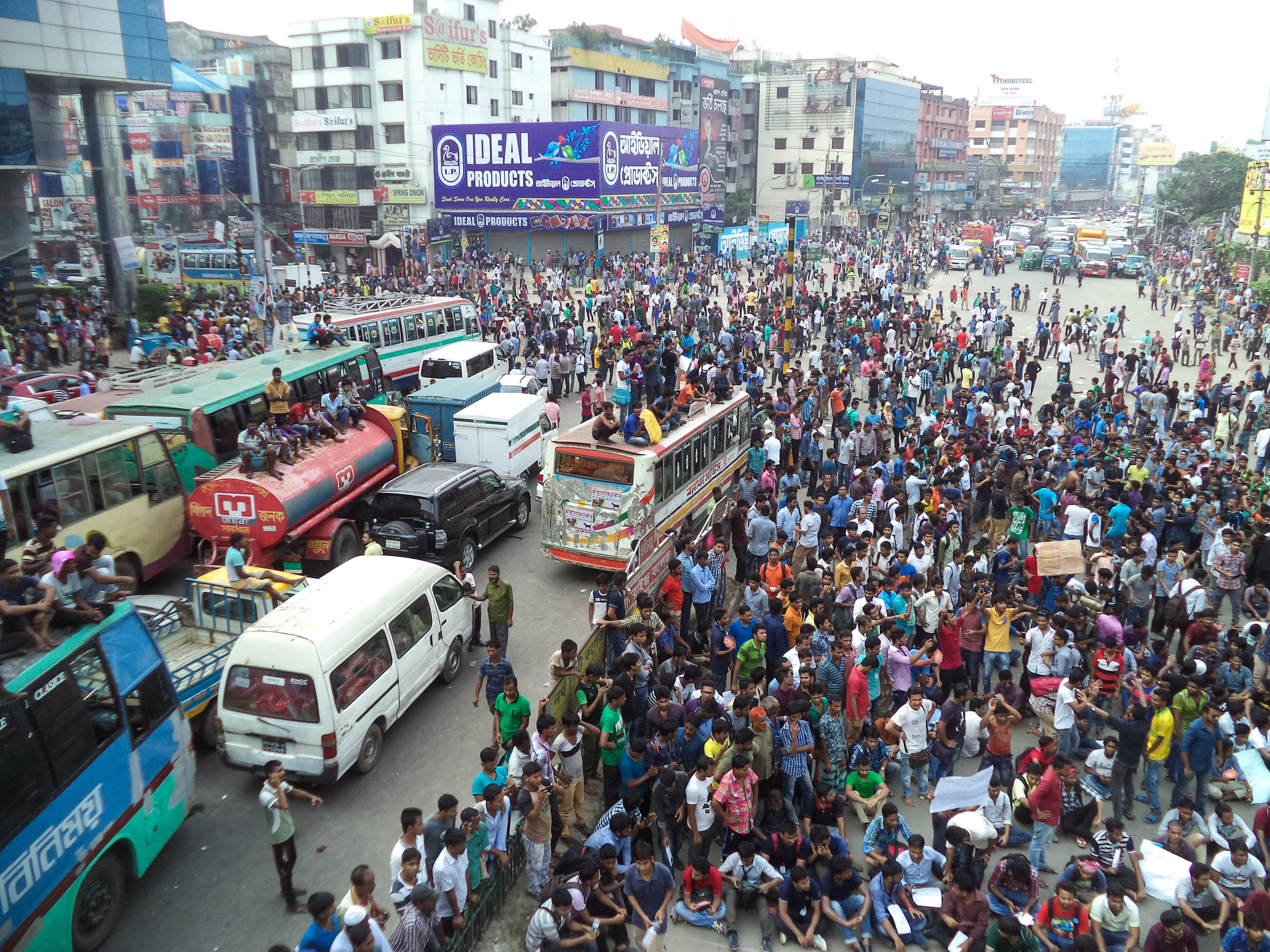
Students in Uttara, Dhaka protest VAT on tuition fees

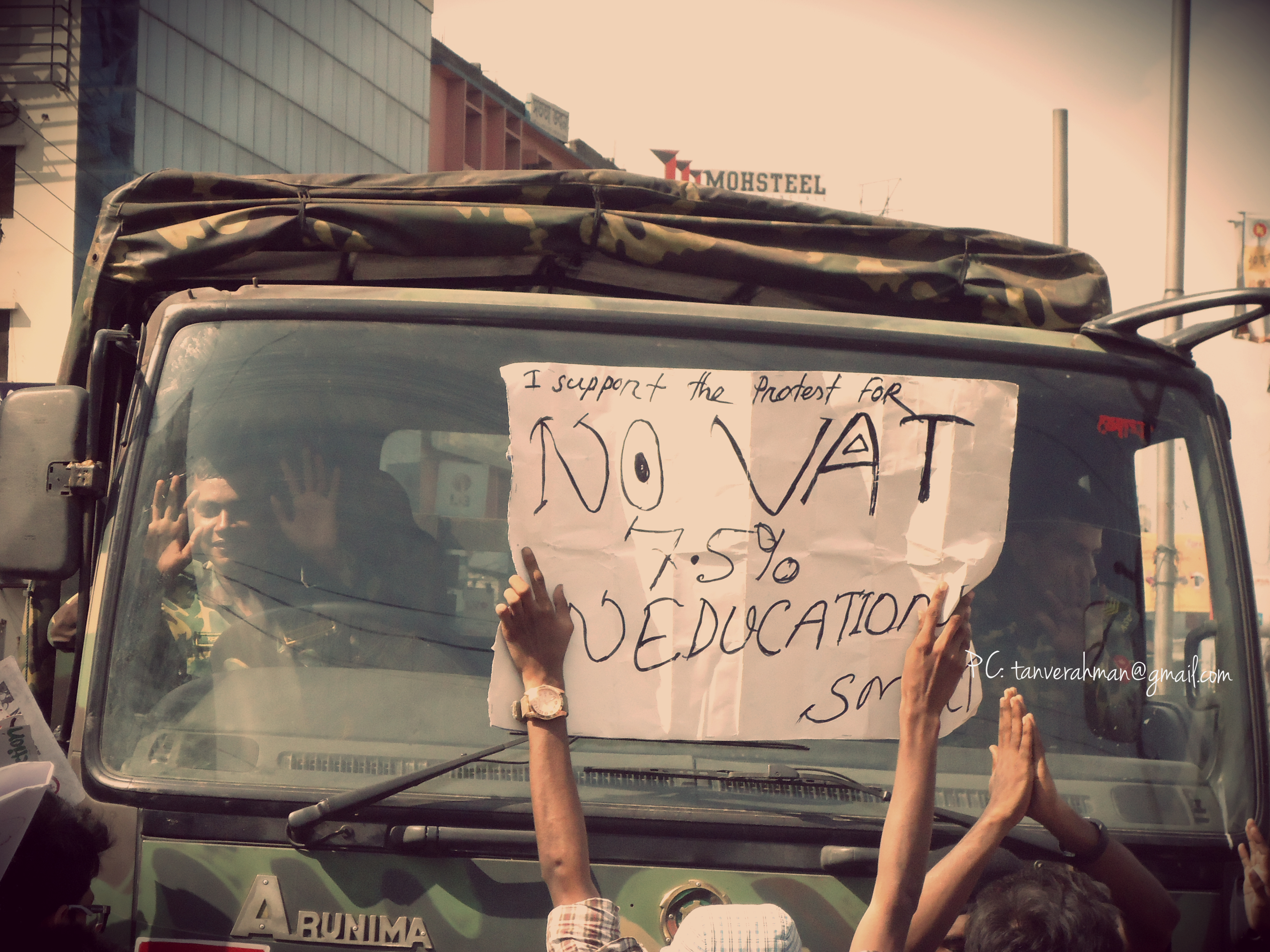
Students protests against the imposition of vat in their tuition fees by upholding the placard in front of Army vehicle.

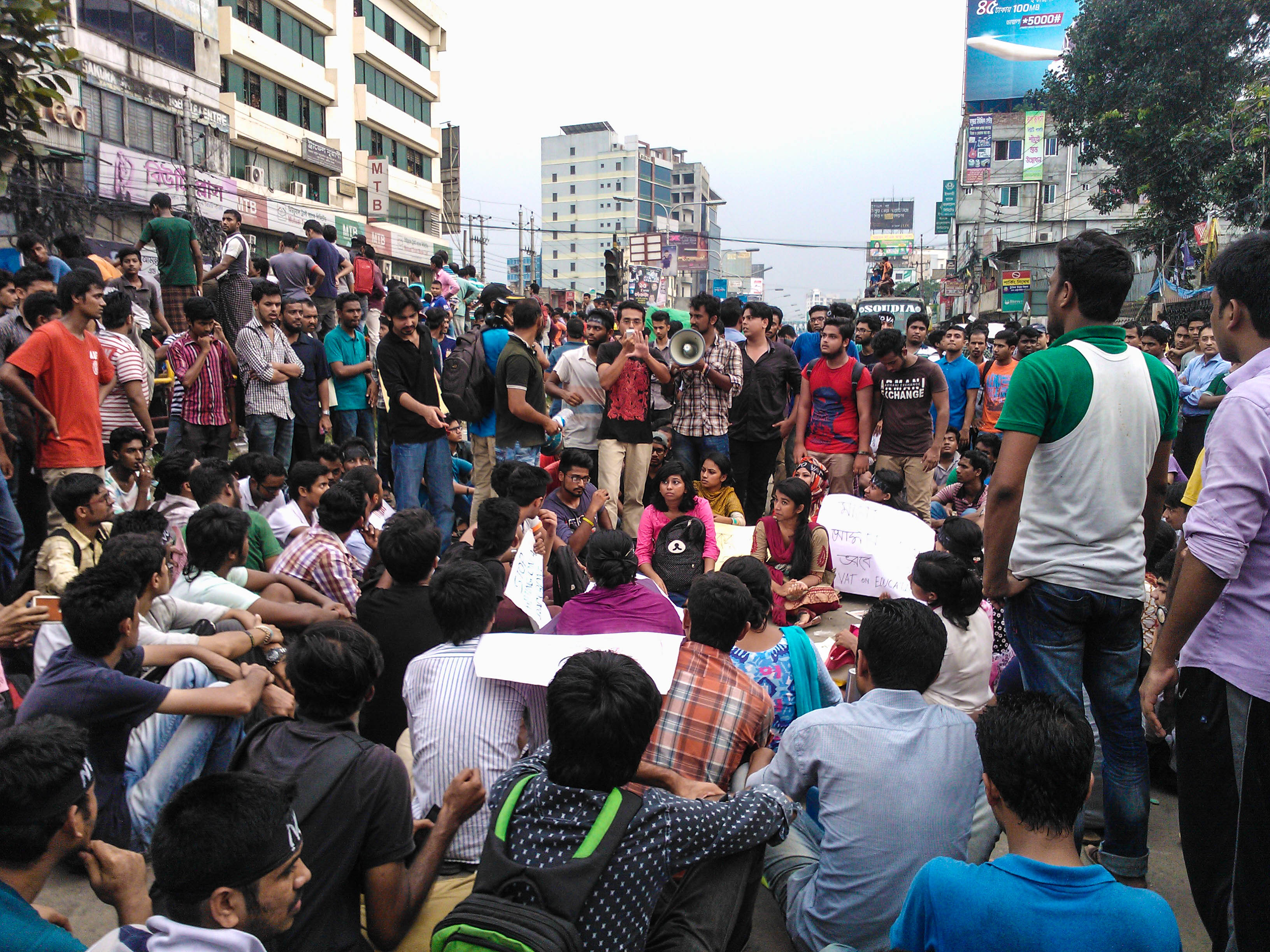
Students in Bashundhara Gate, Dhaka protest VAT on tuition fees

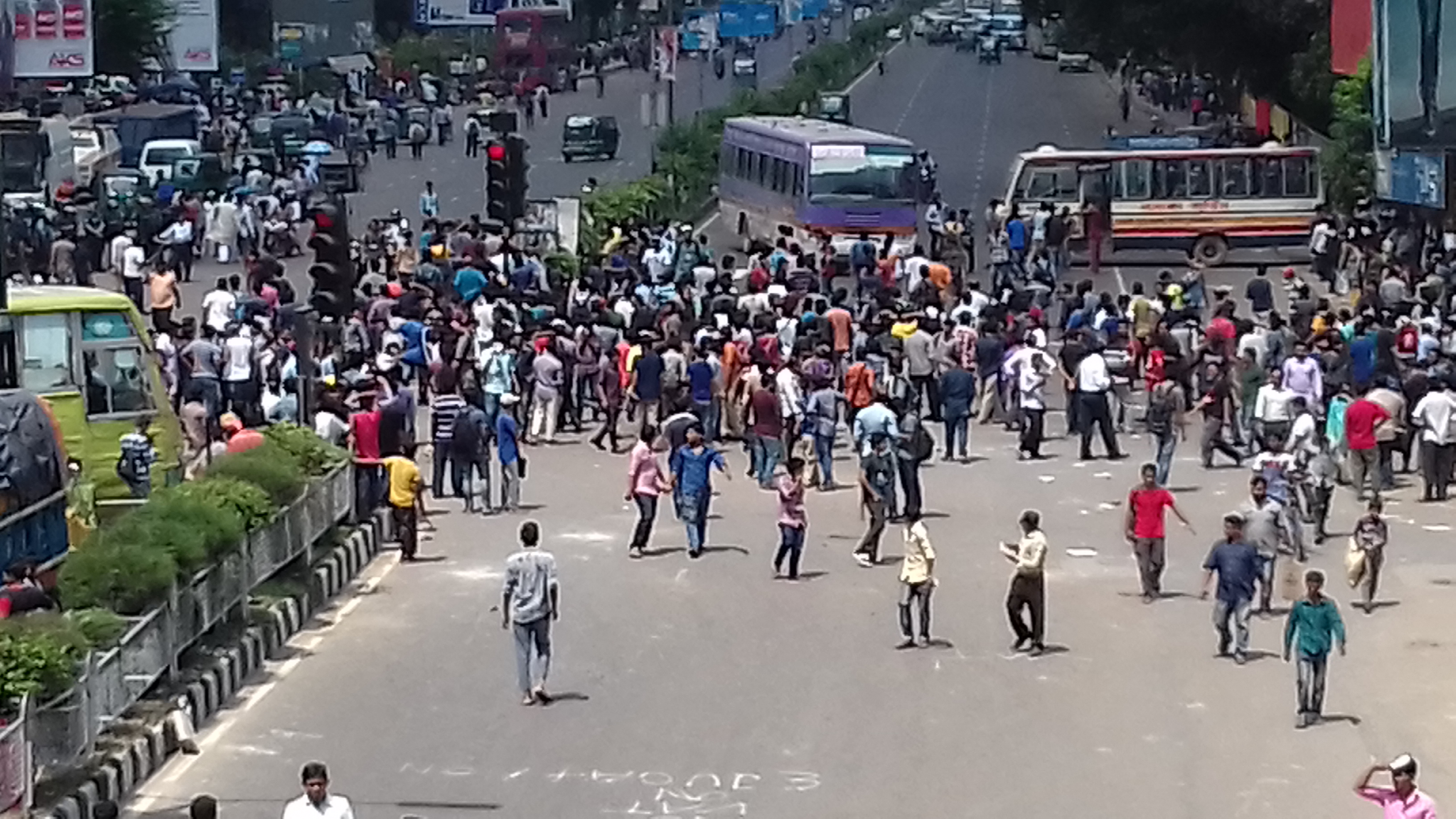
Students in Banani-Kakoli Square, Dhaka protest VAT on tuition fees

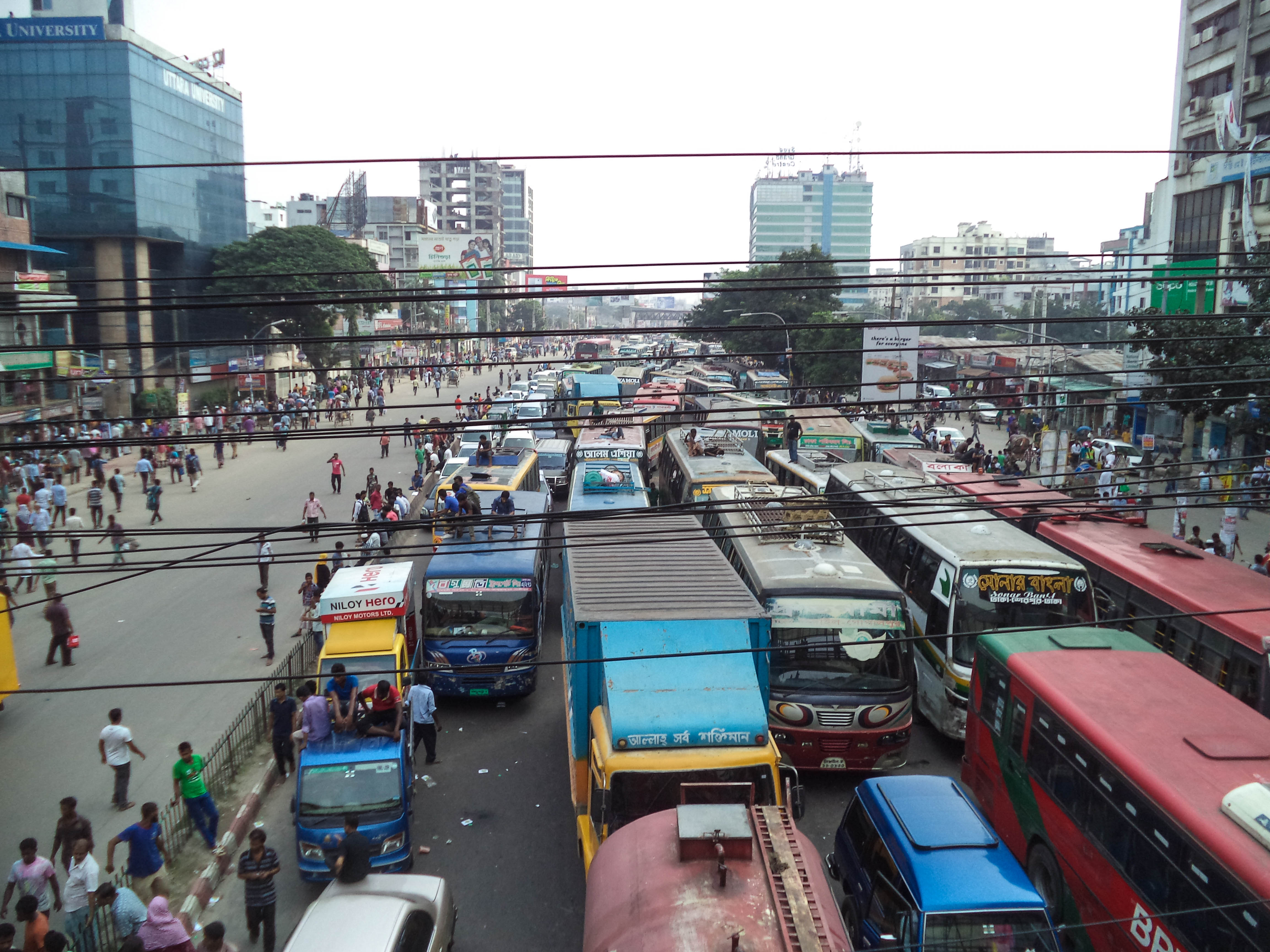
Traffic jam during a protest by private university students in Dhaka against the VAT on tuition fees

== See also ==
- Anti-austerity protests
- Politics of Bangladesh
- 2018 Bangladesh road-safety protests
