= Jatio Sramik Federation =

National trade union federation in Bangladesh

JSF
- Jatio Sramik Federation
- জাতীয় শ্রমিক ফেডারেশন
- Founder: Shajahan Khan
- Headquarters: 31/F Topkhana Road; Dhaka
- Location: Bangladesh
- Members: 15,881 (2003)
- Key people: Abul Bashar, president Shah Alam, general secretary
- Affiliations: WFTU; BRTWF

The Jatio Sramik Federation (JSF) is a national trade union federation in Bangladesh. It is affiliated with the World Federation of Trade Unions.
