= Bangladesh Road Transport Workers Federation =

Trade union in Bangladesh

- বাংলাদেশ সড়ক পরিবহন শ্রমিক ফেডারেশন
- Nickname: Poribohon Sromik Federation
- Formation: 1991
- Founder: Shajahan Khan
- Purpose: Workers welfare
- Headquarters: Motijheel Dhaka, Bangladesh
- Region served: Bangladesh
- Official language: Bengali
- President: Abdur Rahim Bux Dudu (Acting)
- Secretary General: Humayun Kabir Khan (Acting)
- Key people: Humayun Kabir Khan; Sadiqur Rahman Hiru; Abdur Rahim Bux Dudu; Mofizul Haque
- Affiliations: JSF; BJSL; ITUC; WFTU

The Bangladesh Road Transport Workers Federation (Bengali: বাংলাদেশ সড়ক পরিবহন শ্রমিক ফেডারেশন) or BRTWF was established in 1991, after Shajahan Khan successfully united truck, bus and automobile workers federations. It is currently the largest trade union in Bangladesh.

The federation incumbent Acting president is the Abdur Rahim Bux Dudu. Humayun Kabir Khan is the Acting General Secretary, Sadiqur Rahman Hiru is the organiser. Abdur Rahim Box Dudu, Mofizul Haque Bebu, Tajul Islam are vice-presidents. Humayun Kabir Khan, Jubayer Jakir, Shojib Ali, Rofiqul Islam, M.A. Majid and Abul Bahar serve as joint-secretary of the central committee. Soto Monir MP is the board chair of the Tangail district.

== Criticism ==
The Bangladesh Road Transport Workers Federation was heavily criticised for their role in the 2018 Bangladesh road-safety protests. They were once accused of snatching newspapers that criticised their leader.
