= Madaripur-2 =

Constituency of Bangladesh's Jatiya Sangsad

Coordinates: 23.21°N 90.05°E

- Constituency for the Jatiya Sangsad
- District: Madaripur District
- Division: Dhaka Division
- Electorate: 347,230 (2018)

Current constituency
- Created: 1984
- Party: Bangladesh Nationalist Party
- Member: Jahander Ali Miah
- ← 218 Madaripur-1 220 Madaripur-3 →

Madaripur-2 is a constituency represented in the Jatiya Sangsad (National Parliament) of Bangladesh since 2026 by Jahander Ali Miah of the Bangladesh Nationalist Party.

== Boundaries ==
The constituency encompasses Rajoir Upazila, Madaripur Municipality, and ten union parishads of Madaripur Sadar Upazila: Bahadurpur, Chilar Char, Dhurail, Dudkhali, Kalikapur, Kunia, Panchokhola, Pearpur, Rasti, and Sirkhara.

== History ==
The constituency was created in 1984 from a Faridpur constituency when the former Faridpur District was split into five districts: Rajbari, Faridpur, Gopalganj, Madaripur, and Shariatpur.

== Members of Parliament ==
Election	Member	Party
1986	Shajahan Khan	Jatiya Party
1988	Sirajul Islam Bhuiyan	Awami League
Sep 1991 by-election	Shajahan Khan	Awami League
Feb 1996	Qazi Mahabub Ahmed	Bangladesh Nationalist Party
Jun 1996	Shajahan Khan	Awami League
2026	Jahander Ali Miah	Bangladesh Nationalist Party

== Elections ==
=== Elections in the 2020s ===
General election 2026: Madaripur-2
Party	Candidate	Votes	%	±%
BNP	Md Jahander Ali Miah			
Independent	Milton Baidya			
Bangladesh Kalyan Party	Subal Chandra Majumder			
BKM	Abdus Sobahan			
Independent	Md. Reazul Islam			
Independent	Shahidul Islam Khan			
Independent	Muha Kamrul Islam Sayeed			
IAB	Ali Ahmed Chowdhury			
JP(E)	Md Mohidul Islam			
BSD (Marxist)	Mohammad Didar Hossain			
Majority				
Turnout				

=== Elections in the 2010s ===
Shajahan Khan was re-elected unopposed in the 2014 general election after opposition parties withdrew their candidacies in a boycott of the election.

=== Elections in the 2000s ===
General Election 2008: Madaripur-2
Party	Candidate	Votes	%	±%
AL	Shajahan Khan	179,883	83.3	+9.4
BNP	Helen Jerin Khan	28,594	13.2	−11.4
IAB	Md. Abdul Malek	7,496	3.5	N/A
Majority		151,289	70.0	+20.7
Turnout		215,973	80.8	+13.1
AL hold				

General Election 2001: Madaripur-2
Party	Candidate	Votes	%	±%
AL	Shajahan Khan	139,096	73.9	+10.4
BNP	Sirajul Islam Bhuiyan	46,234	24.6	+7.2
IJOF	Md. Atikur Rahman Hawlader	2,424	1.3	N/A
JSD	A. Rashid Khan Badal	323	0.2	+0.1
Independent	Helen Jerin Khan	120	0.1	N/A
Majority		92,862	49.3	+3.2
Turnout		188,197	67.7	−5.1
AL hold				

=== Elections in the 1990s ===
General Election June 1996: Madaripur-2
Party	Candidate	Votes	%	±%
AL	Shajahan Khan	92,492	63.5	
BNP	Qazi Mahabub Ahmed	25,397	17.4	
JP(E)	Golam Moula	17,031	11.7	
IOJ	Md. Azahar Uddin	3,165	2.2	
Independent	Syed Nawbab Chand	2,831	1.9	
Jamaat	Md. Sobahan Khan	2,803	1.9	
Zaker Party	A. Rab Hawladar	1,404	1.0	
JSD	Md. Abdul Hye Hawladar	200	0.1	
Social Democratic Pafiy	Md. Mizanur Rahman Mridha	199	0.1	
Independent	A. Sattar Sipai	155	0.1	
Majority		67,095	46.1	
Turnout		145,677	72.8	
AL hold				

Abdur Razzaq stood for two seats in the 1991 general election: Madaripur-2 and Shariatpur-3. After winning both, he chose to represent Shariatpur-3 and quit Madaripur-2, triggering a by-election in it. Shajahan Khan of the Awami League was elected in a September 1991 by-election.

General Election 1991: Madaripur-2
Party	Candidate	Votes	%	±%
BAKSAL	Abdur Razzaq	61,532	46.4	
JSD	Shajahan Khan	30,156	22.8	
Bangladesh National Congress	Abdul Mannan Shikdar	15,436	11.6	
JP(E)	Sirajul Islam Bhuiyan	9,869	7.4	
Jamaat	Samsul Haq	6,355	4.8	
Zaker Party	Md. Enamul Haq	4,744	3.6	
BKA	H. Anwarul Haq	2,973	2.2	
Independent	Nurul Amin	1,278	1.0	
Independent	Ferdaus Jomadar	183	0.1	
Majority		31,376	23.7	
Turnout		132,526	50.9	
BAKSAL gain from JP(E)				
