= Abdul Mannan Choudhury =

Bangladeshi academic

- আবদুল মান্নান চৌধুরী
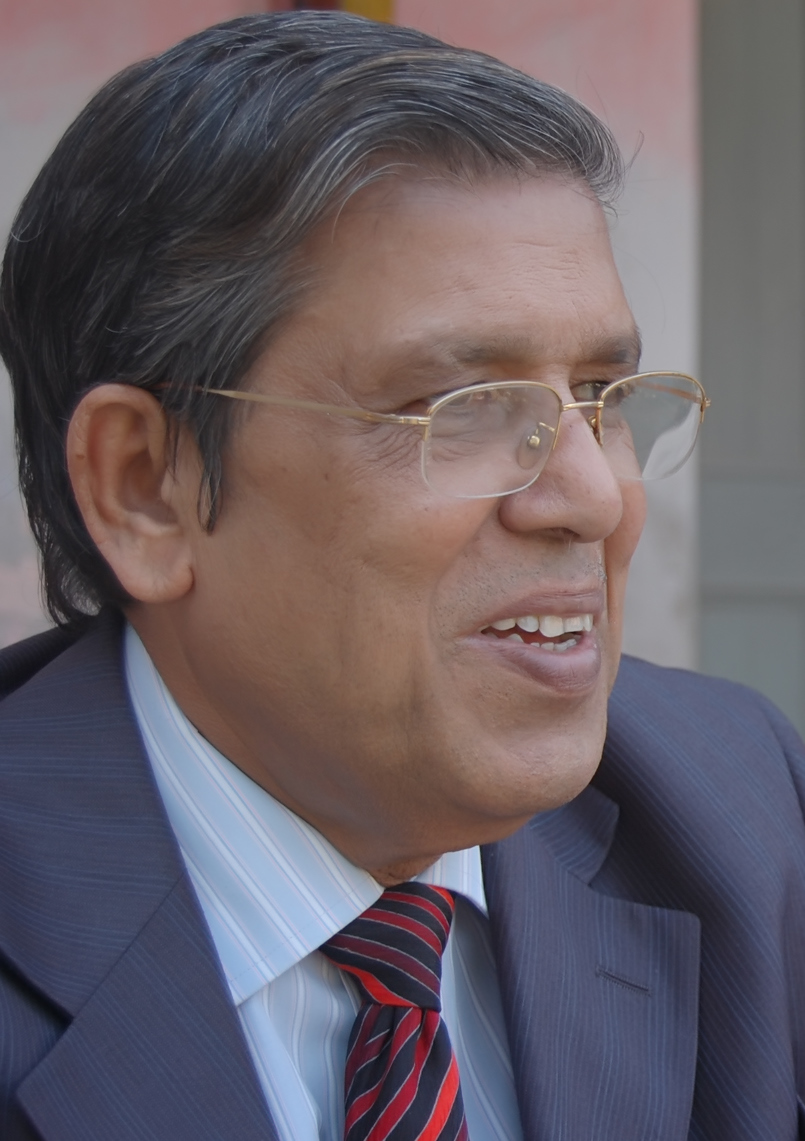

Vice-Chancellor of World University of Bangladesh

Personal details
- Born: 1 January 1948 (age 78) Comilla, Bangladesh
- Spouse: Morsheda Choudhury
- Education: PhD (London), MBA (Manchester), B.Com Hons. & M.Com, Dhaka.
- Profession: Author, educationist, columnist, administrator

Abdul Mannan Choudhury (born 1 January 1948) is a Bangladeshi academic, educationist and veteran of the liberation war of Bangladesh.

He is the vice-chancellor of the World University of Bangladesh. He was formerly a professor and a selection grade professor at the University of Dhaka.

== Education ==
Choudhury was born in what is now Comilla District of Bangladesh. He completed his PhD from London, his MBA from Manchester Business School and Master of Commerce from Dhaka University.

== Career ==
Choudhury was a freedom fighter and he took part in several movements related to the Bangladesh Liberation War. He was an advisor of National Council for Freedom Fighters.

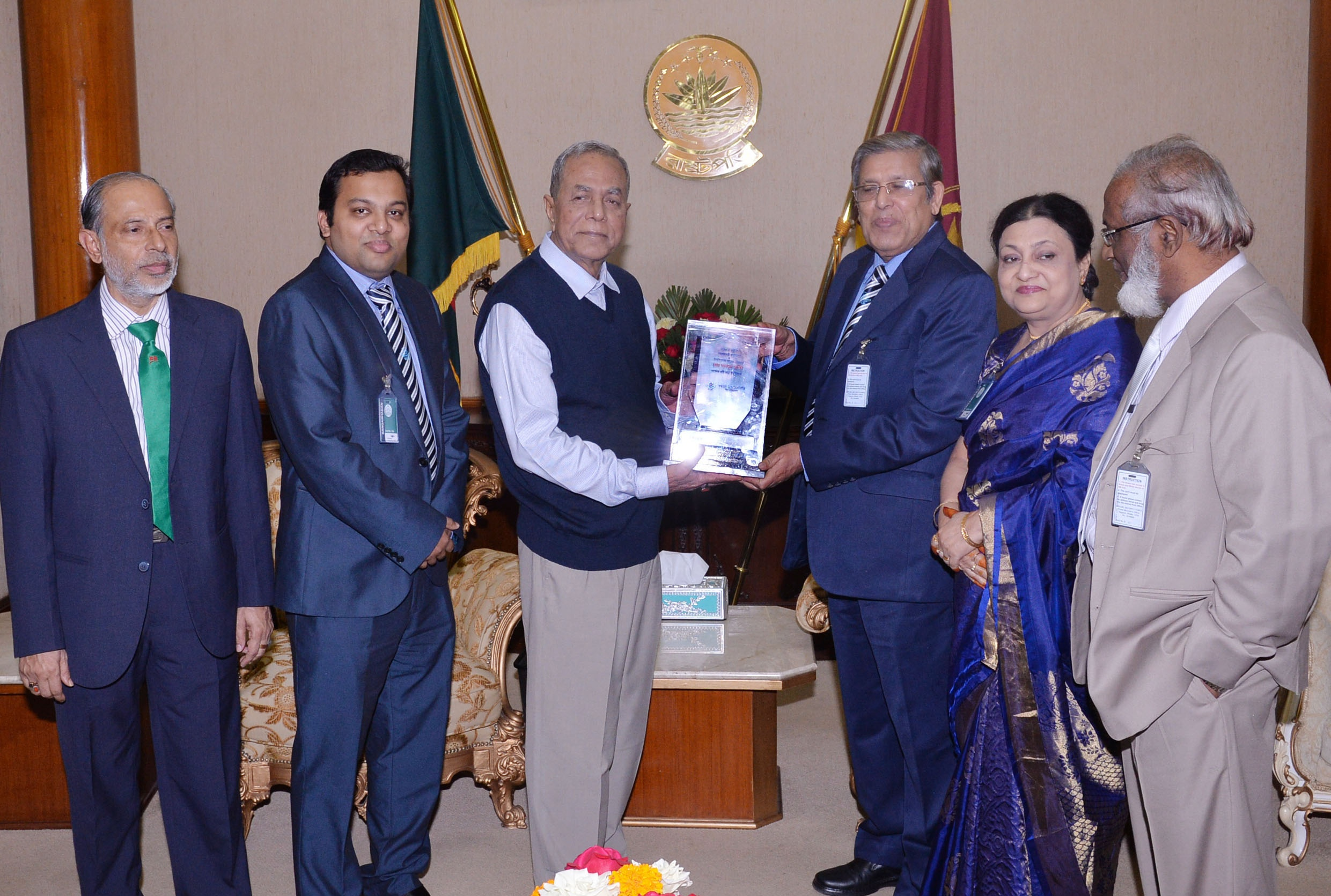
Professor Abdul Mannan Choudhury and President Md Abdul Hamid At Bangabhaban (2015-02-15)

Choudhury served as the head of the department, academic dean, and syndicate member at Bayero University in Nigeria. As an associate professor, he joined Dhaka University in 1978. He was the proctor of the University of Dhaka from 1987 to 1989. From 1989 to 1992, he was a professor of management at Dhaka University. In 1992, he was promoted to selection grade professor of management. On 12 April 2005, Dhaka University appointed Choudhury the first chairman of the Department of Management Information Systems (MIS). From 2005 to 2012, he served as a selection grade professor in the Department of Management Information Systems (MIS), Dhaka University.

Choudhury was elected as the president of the National Management Association in 1996. He was formerly the director of Bangladesh Commerce Bank Ltd in 1998. He was a member of Finance Committee, University of Dhaka (1998–1999), National Board of Drugs and Narcotics, Ministry of Home Affairs, Government of Bangladesh (1999), Prison Reforms Committee, Ministry of Social Welfare and Government of Bangladesh (1998).

Choudhury served as chairperson of the Department of Management, University of Dhaka, from 1992 to 1995. He was the founder chairman of the National Institute of Business Administration & Information Science (2000) and the Institute of Business Administration & Information Systems (1998). He was the founder director of the Evening MBA Program, Department of Management Studies, University of Dhaka. From 2007 to 2010, he was the vice chancellor of World University of Bangladesh. In 2012 he joined again as the vice chancellor of World University of Bangladesh.

== Personal life ==
Chowdhury's son, Musfiq Mannan Choudhury, is a professor at the University of Dhaka and commissioner of Bangladesh Telecommunication Regulatory Commission.
