= Private University Students Alliance of Bangladesh =

Student organization in Bangladesh

- প্রাইভেট ইউনিভার্সিটি স্টুডেন্টস এলায়েন্স অফ বাংলাদেশ
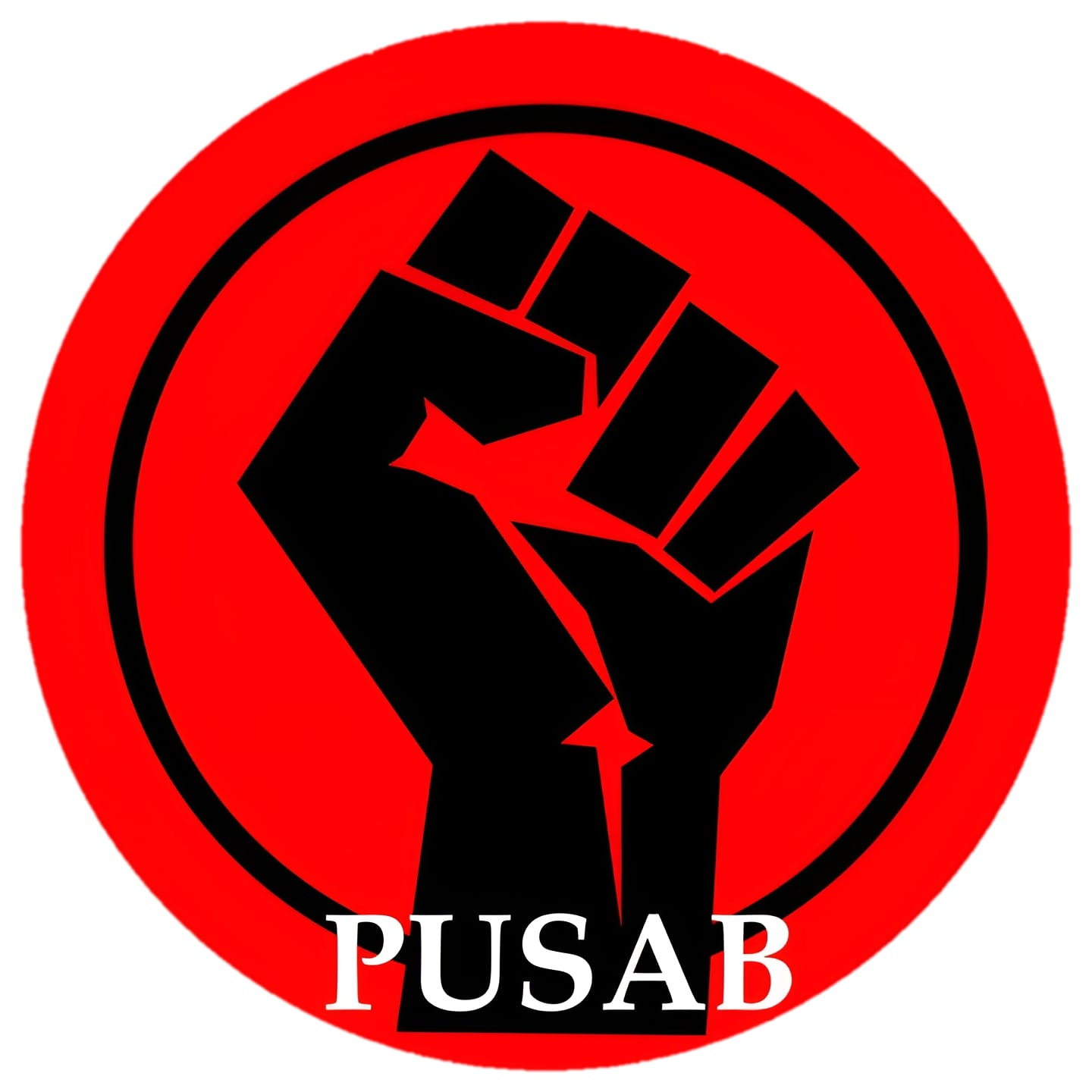
- PUSAB logo
- Abbreviation: PUSAB
- Formation: June 9, 2015; 10 years ago
- Founder: Abdullah Al Mahfuz Zakaria
- Type: Student organization
- Headquarters: Dhaka
- Location: Bangladesh
- Official language: Bengali & English
- Website: pusabbd.com

Private University Students Alliance of Bangladesh (PUSAB; Bengali: প্রাইভেট ইউনিভার্সিটি স্টুডেন্টস এলায়েন্স অফ বাংলাদেশ) is a non-political organization for students of private universities in Bangladesh, established in 2015. PUSAB advocates for students and faculty members in disputes and complaints with university authorities.

== History ==
PUSAB was established on June 9, 2015, to address the challenges faced by private university students in Bangladesh.

PUSAB has provided support for various student movements in Bangladesh. It was formed during the 2015 anti-VAT movement, and has since contributed to the 2018 quota reform protests and the road safety movement. In July 2024, PUSAB played a role in the student protests, and was the first to call for a single-point demand on July 18, advocating for a mass uprising.

== Leadership ==
PUSAB is student-led, and includes representatives from private universities across Bangladesh. PUSAB's leadership structure for the term 2024–2025 is divided into the Standing Committee and the executive committee, along with advisory members from various private universities.
