= Satish Chandra Halder =

Bangladeshi politician

Satish Chandra Halder is a Bangladeshi politician. He was elected to the East Pakistan Provincial Assembly in 1970 from Faridpur-12.
