= Qazi Mahabub Ahmed =

Bangladeshi politician

Member of Parliament for Madaripur-2
- In office 15 February 1996 – 12 June 1996

Member of Parliament for Faridpur-12
- In office 1979–1982

Personal details
- Born: Madaripur
- Party: Bangladesh Nationalist Party

Qazi Mahabub Ahmed (born 11 November 1950) is a Bangladesh Nationalist Party politician and a former member of parliament for Faridpur-12 and Madaripur-2.

== Career ==
Ahmed was elected to parliament from Faridpur-12 as a Bangladesh Nationalist Party candidate in 1979. He was elected to parliament from Madaripur-2 as a Bangladesh Nationalist Party candidate in 1996.
