= Sirajul Islam Bhuiyan =

Bangladeshi politician

Member of Bangladesh Parliament

Personal details
- Died: 15 February 2016 Madaripur, Bangladesh
- Party: Jatiya Party (Ershad)

Sirajul Islam Bhuiyan was a Jatiya Party (Ershad) politician and member of parliament for Madaripur-2.

== Career ==
Bhuiyan was elected to parliament from Madaripur-2 as a Jatiya Party candidate in 1988. He died on 15 February 2016 in Madaripur.
