= World University of Bangladesh =

Private University in Bangladesh

Coordinates: 23.7422°N 90.3825°E

- Motto: Utilitarian Education for Economic Emancipation
- Type: Private
- Established: 26 February 2003; 23 years ago
- Affiliations: Association of Commonwealth Universities; University Grants Commission Bangladesh; Accreditation Council for Business Schools and Programs AACSB; Pharmacy Council of Bangladesh; Institute of Engineers, Bangladesh
- Chancellor: President Mohammed Shahabuddin
- Vice-Chancellor: Abdul Mannan Choudhury
- Faculty: 170
- Administrative staff: 100
- Students: 3,600
- Location: Dhaka, Bangladesh
- Campus: Avenue 6 & Lake Drive Road, Sector # 17/H, Uttara, Dhaka-1230 (Permanent)
- Website: www.wub.edu.bd

University rankings

Regional – Overall
- QS Asia: 1301-1400 (2026)

World University of Bangladesh (Bengali: ওয়ার্ল্ড ইউনিভার্সিটি অব বাংলাদেশ), often abbreviated as WUB, is a private university in Dhaka, Bangladesh. Abdul Mannan Chowdhury is the vice-chancellor of the university. The university is approved by the University Grants Commission of Bangladesh and the Ministry of Education (Bangladesh), under the Private University Act, 2010. The institution is governed by a Board of Trustees and is listed in international university directories maintained by organizations such as UNESCO.

== History ==
World University of Bangladesh (WUB) established in 2003 under the private University Act, 1992 (amended in 1998) and private university Act 2010, approved and recognized by the Ministry of Education, government of Bangladesh and the University Grants Commission (UGC) of Bangladesh. The WUB is a non-profit making concern - and governed by a 9-member board of trustees constituted per the Private Universities Act 1998 (Amended in 2010).

== Administration ==
The university as per requirement of the Private Universities Act. 2010, has a board of trustees consisting of nine members. The board is entrusted with the responsibilities of financing the university and determining the strategies and policies of the university.

=== List of vice-chancellors ===
- Abdul Mannan Choudhury (present).

== Affiliations and memberships ==
World University of Bangladesh is affiliated with several national and international academic organizations, including:

- Association of Commonwealth Universities (ACU)
- International Association of Universities (IAU)
- Association of Universities of Asia and the Pacific (AUAP)
- Accreditation Council for Business Schools and Programs (ACBSP)
- Association to Advance Collegiate Schools of Business (AACSB)
- International Telecommunication Union (ITU)

The university also facilitates professional memberships and academic engagement with organizations such as:

- Institute of Electrical and Electronics Engineers (IEEE)
- American Society of Civil Engineers (ASCE)
- Institution of Civil Engineers (ICE)
- Association for Computing Machinery (ACM)

=== Academic structure ===
The university currently consists of four faculties and sixteen departments, offering approximately 34 undergraduate and postgraduate academic programs. Additional programs are subject to approval from the University Grants Commission of Bangladesh.

=== Academic collaborations ===
World University of Bangladesh maintains credit transfer arrangements and academic collaborations with more than 65 universities worldwide, including institutions in:

- United Kingdom
- United States
- Australia
- Germany
- China
- Japan
- Italy
- Switzerland
- Russia
- Latvia
- Portugal
- Malaysia
- Nigeria
- Philippines
- Vietnam
- Malawi
- Puerto Rico
- Caribbean region

These collaborations aim to facilitate academic exchange, joint research, and student mobility.

== Degree programs ==
The university is authorized to offer undergraduate and postgraduate degrees, diplomas, and certificates independently or in collaboration with other institutions. Convocation ceremonies are held periodically, and degrees are formally conferred under the authority of the President of Bangladesh, who serves as the Chancellor of the university.

World University of Bangladesh has introduced several academic initiatives, including degree programs designed for Diploma Engineers, one of the early academic programs in Mechatronics Engineering in Bangladesh, a Master of Business Education (MBE) program.

WUB offers the following programs from its three faculties.

=== Faculty of Business Studies ===
- Bachelor of Business Administration (BBA)
- Bachelor in Tourism and Hospitality Management (BHTM)
- MBA (Regular)‑ 2 years
- MBA (Executive)‑ 1 year
- MBE (Master of Business Education)‑ 1.5 to 2 years

=== Faculty of Science & Engineering * ===
- B.Sc. in Computer Science & Engineering (CSE)
- B.Sc. in Computing & Information Science (CIS)
- B.Sc. in Electrical & Electronic Engineering (EEE)
- B.Sc. in Civil Engineering(CE)
- B.Sc. in Mechanical Engineering(ME)
- B.Sc. in Automobile Engineering(AE)
- B.Sc. in Mechatronics Engineering (MTE)
- B.Sc. in Textile Engineering (TE)
- Bachelor of Architecture
- Bachelor of Pharmacy

=== Faculty of Arts & Humanities ===
Department of Law

- Bachelor of Laws (LL.B) ‑ 4 years
- Bachelor of Laws (LL.B) ‑ 2 years
- Master of Laws (LL.M) – 1–2 years

Department of English

- BA in English ‑ 4 years
- MA in English ‑2 years
- MA in English ‑1 year

== Student life ==
=== Co-curricula and extracurricular activities ===
All university departments arranged seminars, symposiums, study tours, etc. to encourage the students to link the theories to reality. Besides, the university has many clubs and societies which offer extra-curricular activities. To develop leadership faculties, the students are encouraged to participate in indoor and outdoor sports, cultural programs, debates, celebrations of National Days, Annual Picnic, Excursion, etc.

=== Festival ===
Every year, WUB arranges a day CSE Festival. The festival offers an Inter-University Project showcasing, a Robotics Contest, a college-level debating contest, an IT Olympiad, Seminars, Workshops, and a Gaming Contest. Every year more than fifty universities and twenty schools and colleges participate in the festival.

=== Alumni ===
As of recent records, the university reports more than 25,000 graduates, many of whom are employed in various sectors in Bangladesh and internationally.
