= Parliamentary committees of Bangladesh =

Committees are an important element of the Jatiya Sangsad, as in most modern legislatures.

Bangladesh has three types of parliamentary committees: standing, select, and special. Standing committees are normally constituted for the duration of the parliament, whereas select and special committees are temporary entities created as needed and dissolved when their task is complete.

The Constitution of Bangladesh mandates a minimum of two parliamentary committees: a Public Accounts Committee and a Privileges Committee. Parliament's Rules of Procedure requires additional committees, including one to shadow each government ministry.

Standing committees typically have between 8 and 15 members. Committees sit in private, their meetings are not open to the public or the media.

The standing committees that parallel government ministries, and two financial ones: the Standing Committee on Public Accounts, and Committee on Public Undertakings are widely viewed as the most important ones for oversight and government accountability. Professor of public administration Nizam Ahmed said of Bangladeshi parliamentary committees that "although they do not appear to be good watchdogs, neither can they be considered as poodles." They have little bite - little direct effect on government actions - but their bark can publicise issues and air disagreements. Taiabur Rahman, another academic in the field, wrote that the Bangladesh Parliament has "a weak committee system with marginal scope in ensuring executive accountability."

== List of committees ==
In the 10th parliamentary sessions, there were 50 committees.

1. Committee on Estimates
2. Committee on Government Assurances
3. Standing Committee on Public Accounts
4. Library Committee
5. Committee on Petitions
6. Committee on Private Member's Bills and Resolutions
7. Standing Committee of Privileges
8. House Committee
9. Business Advisory Committee
10. Standing Committee on Rules of Procedure
11. Standing Committee on Ministry of Law, Justice and Parliamentary Affairs
12. Standing Committee on Ministry of Commerce
13. Standing Committee on Ministry of Cultural Affairs
14. Standing Committee on Ministry of Disaster Management & Relief
15. Standing Committee on Ministry of Railway
16. Standing Committee on Ministry of Hill Tracts
17. Standing Committee on Ministry of Science and Technology
18. Standing Committee on Ministry of Youth and Sports
19. Standing Committee on Ministry of Housing and Public Works
20. Standing Committee on Ministry of Primary and Mass Education
21. Standing Committee on Ministry of Social Welfare
22. Standing Committee on Ministry of Land
23. Standing Committee on Ministry of Agriculture
24. Standing Committee on Ministry of Defence
25. Standing Committee on Ministry of Forest and Environment
26. Standing Committee on Ministry of Textile and Jute
27. Standing Committee on Ministry of Food
28. Standing Committee on Ministry of Fisheries & Livestock
29. Standing Committee on Ministry of Women and Children Affairs
30. Standing Committee on Ministry of Power, Energy and Mineral Resources
31. Standing Committee on Ministry of Road Transport and Bridge
32. Standing Committee on Ministry of Shipping
33. Standing Committee on Ministry of Civil Aviation and Tourism
34. Standing Committee on Ministry of Labour and Employment
35. Standing Committee on Ministry of Information
36. Standing Committee on Ministry of Religious Affairs
37. Standing Committee on Ministry of Post Tele Communication & Information Technology
38. Standing Committee on Ministry of Health and Family Planning
39. Standing Committee on Ministry of Education
40. Standing Committee on Ministry of Administration
41. Standing Committee on Ministry of Expatriates Welfare and Overseas Employment
42. Standing Committee on Ministry of Foreign Affairs
43. Standing Committee on Ministry of Industry
44. Standing Committee on Ministry of Liberation War
45. Standing Committee on Ministry of Home Affairs
46. Standing Committee on Ministry of Water Resources
47. Standing Committee on Ministry of Local Government, Rural Development & Co-operatives
48. Standing Committee on Ministry of Planning
49. Standing Committee on Ministry of Finance
50. Committee on Public Undertakings
