= J. B. M. Hassan =

Bangladeshi judge

Justice of the High Court Division of Bangladesh
- Incumbent
- Assumed office 10 May 1992

Personal details
- Born: January 10, 1968 (age 58)
- Profession: Judge

J. B. M. Hassan, also written as JBM Hassan, is a judge of the High Court Division of the Bangladesh Supreme Court.

== Early life ==
Hassan was born on 10 January 1968. He completed his bachelor's degree and masters in law from the University of Rajshahi.

== Career ==
Hassan became a lawyer on the district courts on 10 May 1992.

On 22 January 1994, Hassan became a lawyer of the High Court Division of the Bangladesh Supreme Court.

Hassan became a lawyer of the Appellate Division of Bangladesh Supreme Court on 21 July 2004.

On 18 April 2010, Hassan became an additional judge of the High Court Division of the Bangladesh Supreme Court.

Hassan was made a permanent judge of the High Court Division on 15 April 2012.

Hassan was appointed the judge by Chief Justice Syed Mahmud Hossain on 12 December 2018 to hear former Prime Minister Khaleda Zia's appeal challenging the Bangladesh Election Commission decision to cancel her candidacy ahead of the 11th Parliamentary elections to be held of 31 December 2018. The hearing went to him after Justices Syed Refaat Ahmed and Md Iqbal Kabir delivered a split verdict. Hassan and Justice Md Khairul Alam canceled the candidacy of M. Rashiduzzaman Millat of Bangladesh Nationalist Party for the 11th parliamentary elections. Khaleda Zia's lawyer, AJ Mohammad Ali, expressed no confidence in Hassan.

In January 2021, Hassan and Justice Md Khairul Alam ordered United Hospital, Dhaka to pay 12 million BDT in damages to the families of people who died in the COVID-19 ward fire at the hospital. On 20 September 2021, Hassan and Justice Razik Al Jalil ordered Dhaka WASA to provide it a plan to tackle water contamination.

On 25 January 2021, Hassan and Justice Fatema Najib ordered the closure of all illegal brick kilns in the Chittagong Hill Tracts Districts (Bandarban District, Khagrachari District, and Rangamati District).
