= K. M. Hafizul Alam =

Bangladeshi Judge

The Honourable K. M. Hafizul Alam
- কে. এম. হাফিজুল আলম

Justice of the High Court Division of Bangladesh
- Incumbent
- Assumed office 29 January 2002

Personal details
- Born: 3 March 1974 (age 52)
- Profession: Judge

K. M. Hafizul Alam is a Justice of the High Court Division of the Supreme Court of Bangladesh.

== Early life ==
Hafizul Alam was born on 3 March 1974. Hafizul Alam has a bachelor's and master's in law. He has a Ph.D.

== Career ==
Hafizul Alam became a lawyer of the District Courts on 29 January 2002 and the High Court Division on 27 April 2003.

Hafizul Alam became a lawyer of the Appellate Division on 29 March 2018. He was appointed an additional Judge of the High Court Division on 31 May 2018. In September, Hafizul Alam and Justice Md Nazrul Islam Talukder rejected a petition by Bangladesh Nationalist Party politician Amir Khasru Mahmud Chowdhury challenging a summon by the Anti-Corruption Commission. In November 2018, Hafizul Alam and Justice Md Nazrul Islam Talukder issued a verdict declaring former Prime Minister Khaleda Zia ineligible for elections due to her being sentenced to more than two years imprisonment. Hafizul Alam and Justice Md Nazrul Islam Talukder also ordered a lower court to finish proceedings in the Gatco corruption case, filed against former Prime Minister Khaleda Zia on 2 September 2007 by the Anti-Corruption Commission.

In January 2019, Justice Md Nazrul Islam Takukder and Hafizul Alam summoned S. M. Atiqur Rahman, general manager, Mohammad Ali, deputy general manager, and Md Abdus Samad Sarkar, principal officer of Rupali Bank Limited after their names were exempted from a 150 million taka corruption case. The issued the order on an appeal filed by AHM Bahauddin, managing director of Everest Holding and Technologies Limited, who had been sentenced life imprisonment in the embezzlement case. Hafizul Alam and Justice Md Nazrul Islam Talukder denied bail to the chief auditor of the Farmers Bank in an misappropriation case filed by the Anti-Corruption Commission. In July, Hafizul Alam and Justice Justice Md Nazrul Islam Talukder issued a suomoto ruling ordering bus owners to renew their fitness certificate by 30 September. Hafizul Alam and Justice Md Nazrul Islam Talukder issued an order asking two employees of Rajdhani Unnayan Kartripakkha to surrender to a lower court in six weeks in a case related to Banani's FR Tower design forgery. The verdict was scrapped by a bench of the Appellate Division led by Chief Justice Syed Mahmud Hossain following an appeal by the Anti-Corruption Commission.

In May, Hafizul Alam and Justice Md Nazrul Islam Talukder denied bail to retired Lieutenant Colonel Didarul Alam, Director of Destiny Group, as he was a flight risk in a 19.35 billion BDT money laundering case. In June 2021, Hafizul Alam and Justice Md. Abu Zafor Siddique ordered the arrest of four, including two lawyers, for forging a bail order of the High Court Division.

In June 2023 Hafizul Alam and Justice Md. Abu Ahmed Jamadar, in an International Crimes Tribunal-1 bench headed by Justice Md Shahinur Islam, sentenced four people from Jessore District to death for war crimes, torture and execution of three civilians, during Bangladesh Liberation War.
