= A B M Altaf Hossain =

Bangladeshi Judge

Justice of the High Court Division of Bangladesh
- Incumbent
- Assumed office 11 December 2010

Personal details
- Born: Kurigram District
- Profession: Judge

A B M Altaf Hossain is a Bangladeshi senior lawyer and former judge of the High Court Division of the Supreme Court of Bangladesh. Hossain is a former deputy attorney general of Bangladesh.

== Early life ==
Hossain was born in Kurigram District, Bangladesh.

== Career ==
On 11 December 2010, Deputy Attorney General Hossain spoke at the Acid Survivors Foundation's seminar titled Legal Aid to Acid Victims and Resolving Obstacles.

Deputy Attorney General Hossain represented the government in a petition filed against a factory for sound pollution in June 2011.

Hossain, as the deputy attorney general, prosecuted M Ruhul Amin, lecturer at Jahangirnagar University, for posting a comment on Facebook wishing for the death of Prime Minister Sheikh Hasina on 5 January 2012. In February 2012, he condemned Khaleda Zia's statement on the murder of Sagar Sarowar and Meherun Runi in court.

Hossain was appointed as an additional judge of the High Court Division of Bangladesh Supreme Court in June 2012 along with five other judges.

On 24 July 2012, Hossain and Justice Hasan Foez Siddique issued a verdict against Abdul Hamid (then speaker of parliament and later President of Bangladesh) after Hamid called a speech critical of the parliament by Justice AHM Shamsuddin Choudhury Manik a violation of the constitution.

In June 2013, Hossain was part of a large High Court bench that examined the Ashiyan City housing project to determine whether its activities were legal. On 28 July 2013, Hossain and Justice Quazi Reza-Ul Hoque ordered the government to take action against Hefazat-e-Islam Bangladesh for attacking journalists and to provide treatment to the injured journalists.

Hossain issued a verdict on 31 January 2014 that declared the government policy mandating the Anti-Corruption Commission to seek its approval before investigating corruption allegations against government officials to violate people's fundamental rights to equality before law and right to protection of law guaranteed by the constitution. On 9 February 2014, Hossain and Justice Quazi Reza-Ul Hoque ordered to the government to pay 4.3 million taka to the Hindu community, a religious minority, who were attacked by religious extremists following an allegedly blasphemous post on Facebook.

In June 2014, Hossain's name was dropped from the promotion list but the five other judges, who became judges at the same time as Hossain, were made permanent judges of the High Court Division. According to The Daily Star "influential people" in the government were unhappy with certain verdicts by Hossain. The government people were also unhappy with a verdict against President Abdul Hamid and Hossain's attempt to get government housing despite being an additional judge and not a permanent one.

Hossain filed a petition demanding he be made a permanent judge of the High Court Division. The petition was dismissed by Justice Sheikh Hassan Arif and Justice Abu Taher Md Saifur Rahman. Hossain was represented by Advocate Salauddin Dolon and one of the judges in the case felt embarrassed to hear the petition.

In March 2016, Hossain represented M Abdullah in a legal challenge against the Bangladesh Association of International Recruiting Agencies for dropping his name from the voter list.

In January 2022, Hossain represented Md Humayun Kabir Khandaker, secretary of the Election Commission, at a hearing at the High Court.
