= Razik-Al-Jalil =

Bangladeshi judge

Justice of the High Court Division of Bangladesh
- Incumbent
- Assumed office 15 September 1992

Personal details
- Born: November 22, 1962 (age 63)
- Profession: Judge

Razik-Al-Jalil is a judge of the High Court Division of Bangladesh Supreme Court.

== Early life ==
Razik-Al-Jalil was born on 22 November 1962 to Justice Md. Abdul Jalil and Syeda Hazera Jalil. He completed his undergraduate and graduate studies in political science before completing his law degree.

== Career ==
Razik-Al-Jalil became a lawyer of district courts on 15 September 1992.

On 28 January 1995, Razik-Al-Jalil became a lawyer of the High Court Division of Bangladesh Supreme Court.

Razik-Al-Jalil was appointed an additional judge of the High Court Division on 12 February 2015.

On 8 February 2017, Razik-Al-Jalil was made a permanent judge of the High Court Division of Bangladesh Supreme Court.

Razik-Al-Jalil and Justice FRM Nazmul Ahasan refused to hear a petition on 20 December 2018 that challenged the legality of the upcoming 11th parliamentary election scheduled to be held on 30 December 2018.

Razik-Al-Jalil and Justice Sheikh Hassan Arif issued a verdict on 13 February saying the media reports should not disclose the identities of those under 18. The verdict was given after barrister Sayedul Haque Sumon filed a petition following a report on The Daily Star that mentioned the name of an underage convict. On 11 December 2019, Razik-Al-Jalil and Justice Md Ashraful Kamal issued an order cancelling the 27 November 1995 verdict by Justice Khandker Musa Khaled, judge of the First Court of Settlement of Dhaka, who handed over government land in Kakrail to four claimants. Razik-Al-Jalil and Kamal observed that the judgement was flawed and questioned the integrity of Justice Khandker Musa Khaled.

On 1 November 2020, Razik-Al-Jalil and Justice Naima Haider ordered the government to pay the benefits and retrospectively promote 39 members of the first Bangladesh Civil Service Batch, known as the freedom fighters batch, which had been denied to them from 2001 to 2003. Razik-Al-Jalil and Justice Md Ashraful Kamal on 8 November asked the government to collect tax revenue from Amazon, Facebook, and Google. On 19 November 2020, Razik-Al-Jalil and Justice Md Ashraful Kamal in a verdict declared the government policy change of allowing practitioners of alternate medicine to use the title of doctor to be illegal.

Razik-Al-Jalil and Justice Md Ashraful Kamal on 18 July 2021 issued a verdict declaring Sonargaon Economic Zone illegal and called one the government to create a separate ministry for the protection of wetlands. On 13 December, Razik-Al-Jalil and Justice JBM Hassan rejected a petition by Shahidul Alam challenging the legality of his decision under Information and Communication Technology Act, 2006 during the 2018 Bangladesh road-safety protests.
