= Md. Rezaul Haque =

Bangladeshi judge

The Honourable Justice Md. Rezaul Haque
- বিচারপতি মো. রেজাউল হক
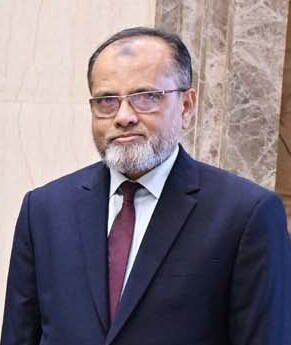
- Rezaul in 2024

Justice of the Appellate Division, Supreme Court
- Incumbent
- Assumed office 13 August 2024

Justice of the High Court Division of Bangladesh

Personal details
- Born: April 24, 1960 (age 65)
- Profession: Judge

Justice Md. Rezaul Haque is a Bangladeshi judge currently serving in the Appellate Division of the Bangladesh Supreme Court.

== Early life ==
Rezaul Haque was born on 24 April 1960. He holds a Bachelor's of Laws (LL.B.) and a Master of Arts degree.

== Career ==
Rezaul Haque joined the District Court on 8 April 1984. He became a lawyer of the High Court Division on 21 June 1990.

On 23 August 2004, Rezaul Haque was appointed an additional judge of the High Court Division. Rezaul Haque was made a permanent judge on 23 August 2006.

Rezaul Haque and Justice Nazmun Ara Sultana issued a verdict asking the government to explain Justice Md Abdul Wahab should not be reappointed to the court on 9 March 2009. Md Abdul Wahab was appointed to the court on 29 May 1984 as an additional judge but his appointment was not confirmed after two years. Rezaul Haque and Justice Nazmun Ara Sultana issued a stay order on a notice of the Anti-Corruption Commission sent to Hasina Ahmed, a member of parliament of the opposition Bangladesh Nationalist Party.

On 3 September 2014, Rezaul Haque and Justice Gobinda Chandra Tagore refused to hear a petition by Tanvir Rahman, an official of Scholastica and a suspect in the Murder of Sagar Sarowar and Meherun Runi, due to personal conflicts.

Rezaul Haque and Justice Md Khosruzzaman granted bail to Bangladesh Nationalist Party politician Gayeshwar Chandra Roy on 15 November 2015.

On 25 June 2018, Rezaul Haque and Justice Muhammad Khurshid Alam Sarkar granted bail to Taimur Alam Khandaker, advisor to the chairperson of Bangladesh Nationalist Party Khaleda Zia. Rezaul Haque and Justice Zafar Ahmed granted bail to Bangladesh Nationalist Party politician Mirza Abbas and his wife Afroja Abbas.

Rezaul Haque and Justice Md Atoar Rahman on 14 December 2020 stayed a case against Matiur Rahman, editor of Prothom Alo, over the death of a student of Dhaka Residential Model College who was accidentally electrocuted at a program of the Prothom Alo. Rezaul Haque and Justice Bhishmadev Chakrabortty issued an order saying a rape accused cannot be found innocent only on the basis of the absence of medical evidence.

Rezaul Haque and Justice Md Badiuzzaman denied the bail request of Helena Jahangir, a former Awami League politician, facing a Digital Security Act case.

On 20 April 2022, Rezaul Haque and Justice Mohammad Ali heard 285 cases in an attempt to reduce the backlog of cases at the court.
