= Md. Abu Ahmed Jamadar =

Bangladeshi Judge

Justice of the High Court Division of Bangladesh
- Incumbent
- Assumed office 22 February 1984

Personal details
- Born: June 16, 1957 (age 69)
- Education: University of Rajshahi
- Profession: Judge

Md. Abu Ahmed Jamadar is a justice of the High Court Division of the Bangladesh Supreme Court. He is serving as chairman judge of the International Crimes Tribunal since February 2024.

== Early life ==
Jamadar was born on 16 June 1957. He fought in the Bangladesh Liberation War. He has an LLB and MSc from the University of Rajshahi.

== Career ==
Jamadar joined the judicial branch of the Bangladesh Civil Service on 22 February 1984 as a munsif. In October 2008, he was promoted to district and sessions judge. From 2009 to 2014, he served as the joint secretary at the Ministry of Law, Justice and Parliamentary Affairs.

In June 2015, Jamadar as the judge of the Special Judge Court-3 set the date for the Zia Charitable Trust corruption case and Zia Orphanage Trust corruption case against former prime minister Khaleda Zia. In December 2016, Khaleda Zia pleaded not guilty in the Special Judge Court-3. Justice M Enayetur Rahim and Justice Shahidul Karim of the Bangladesh High Court transferred the cases from Jamadar's Court to the Special Judge Court-5 headed by Mohammed Akhtaruzzaman following a petition by Khaleda Zia.

In August 2015, Jamadar sentenced Mahmudur Rahman, editor of Amar Desh, to three years imprisonment for failure to submit his wealth statement to the Anti-Corruption Commission.

Jamadar was appointed a judge to the International Crimes Tribunal-1 on 11 October 2017 after retiring as a district judge. In November 2017, Jamadar and Justice Amir Hossain, in an International Crimes Tribunal-1 bench headed by Justice Md Shahinur Islam, sentenced five to death including a former member of parliament and Bangladesh Jamaat-e-Islami politician Abu Saleh Md Abdul Aziz Mia.

In January 2018, Jamadar and Justice Amir Hossain, in an International Crimes Tribunal-1 bench headed by Justice Md Shahinur Islam, sentenced three people from Moulvibazar District to death. to In March 2018, Jamadar and Justice Amir Hossain, in an International Crimes Tribunal-1 bench headed by Justice Md Shahinur Islam, sentenced three people from Noakhali District who had served in the Razakar to death war crimes during Bangladesh Liberation War. On 31 May 2018, Jamadar was appointed an additional judge of the High Court Division. He along with 17 other newly appointed judges paid tribute to Sheikh Mujibur Rahman at his shrine in Tungipara after their appointment.

Jamadar was reappointed to the International Crimes Tribunal-1 on 5 July 2018. In July, Jamadar and Justice Amir Hossain, in an International Crimes Tribunal-1 bench headed by Justice Md Shahinur Islam, sentenced four people from Moulvibazar DIstrict to death all who served in the Razakar. In August 2018, Jamadar and Justice Amir Hossain, in an International Crimes Tribunal-1 bench headed by Justice Md Shahinur Islam, sentenced five people from Patuakhali District who had served the Razakar Bahini and were members of the Convention Muslim League. In November, Jamadar and Justice Amir Hossain, in an International Crimes Tribunal-1 bench headed by Justice Md Shahinur Islam, sentenced two people from Habiganj District to death, including one former politician of the Awami League.

In March 2019, Jamadar and Justice Amir Hossain, in an International Crimes Tribunal-1 bench headed by Justice Md Shahinur Islam, sentenced five Netrokona District men to death, including an Awami League politician. In August 2019, Jamadar and Justice Amir Hossain, in an International Crimes Tribunal-1 bench headed by Justice Md Shahinur Islam, sentenced a Rajshahi man to death for killing 15 people while serving in the Razakar during the Bangladesh Liberation War. In October, Jamadar and Justice Amir Hossain, in an International Crimes Tribunal-1 bench headed by Justice Md Shahinur Islam, sentenced five people from Gaibandha District to death for war cimes during Bangladesh Liberation War. In December 2019, Jamadar and Justice Amir Hossain, in an International Crimes Tribunal-1 bench headed by Justice Md Shahinur Islam, sentenced Abdus Sattar, a member of Islami Chhatra Sangha and Razakar, to death for war crimes, related to the killing of Babar Mandal and attack on Talaimari village.

On 30 May 2020, Jamadar was made a permanent judge of the High Court Division by President Md Abdul Hamid. He was the director of the Deutsche Gesellschaft für Internationale Zusammenarbeit sponsored Justice Reform and Corruption Prevention Project.

In June 2023, Jamadar, in an International Crimes Tribunal-1 bench headed by Justice Md Shahinur Islam, sentenced four people from Jessore District to death for war crimes, torture and execution of three civilians, during Bangladesh Liberation War. On 26 February 2024 he appointed as the chairman of the International Crimes Tribunal (ICT).

== Personal life ==
Jamadar's son, Ishtiaq Ahmed, was the additional deputy commissioner of Dhaka Metropolitan Police. In April 2025, he was arrested by the investigation agency of the International Crimes Tribunal for allegedly using drones and helicopters to attack protestors against Prime Minister Sheikh Hasina in July 2024. Md Rashed Khan, leader of the student of the 2018 quota reform movement and advisor to Prime Minister Tareque Rahman, alleged Ahmed tortured him in 2018.
