= Md. Zakir Hossain (judge) =

Bangladeshi judge

Justice of the High Court Division of Bangladesh

Personal details
- Born: January 1, 1963 (age 63)
- Education: University of Dhaka
- Profession: Judge

Md. Zakir Hossain is a justice of the High Court Division of the Bangladesh Supreme Court. He is the former register general of the Bangladesh Supreme Court.

== Early life ==
Hossain was born on 1 January 1963. He did his bachelor of laws, master of laws, and Ph.D. from the University of Dhaka. He has another master of laws from the International Maritime Law Institute.

== Career ==
Hossain became an advocate of the Dhaka District Court on 26 October 1987.

Hossain was appointed the acting register of the Bangladesh Supreme Court on 17 October 2017.

In March 2018, following the recommendation of Chief Justice Syed Mahmud Hossain, Hossain was made the register general of Bangladesh Supreme Court by the Ministry of Law, Justice and Parliamentary Affairs.

In April 2019, Hossain issued a circular which stated that the statements of rape victims can only be taken by female magistrates. On 21 October 2019, Hossain was appointed an additional judge of the High Court Division.

In September 2021, Hossain and Justice Abu Taher Md Saifur Rahman criticized the government for its failure to regulate the e-commerce market in Bangladesh and not taking steps to prevent fraud.

In July 2022, Hossain and Justice Khizir Ahmed Choudhury order the secretary of the Ministry of Social Welfare to provide five hundred thousand BDT to a child born in a road accident which left both parents dead and establish a committee to look after the treatment of the newborn. In October 2022, Hossain and Justice Md Salim ordered law enforcement agencies to not harass a "rebel" fraction of the Bangladesh Chhatra League at Eden Mohila College.

== Bibliography ==
- Law of Writs: Constitutional Remedies (2012)
