= S. M. Maniruzzaman (judge) =

Judge in Bangladesh Supreme court

Justice of the High Court Division of Bangladesh
- Incumbent
- Assumed office 13 April 1996

Personal details
- Born: February 1, 1972 (age 54)
- Profession: Judge

S. M. Maniruzzaman is a Justice of the High Court Division of the Bangladesh Supreme Court.

== Early life ==
Maniruzzaman was born on 1 February 1972. He has a Bachelor of Laws and a Master of Laws.

== Career ==
Maniruzzaman joined the district court on 13 April 1996 and the High Court Division on 30 October 1997.

On 24 April 2009, Maniruzzaman was appointed the Assistant Attorney General. He was promoted to Deputy Attorney General on 10 April 2011.

Maniruzzaman became a lawyer of the Appellate Division of the Supreme Court on 1 March 2018. He was appointed an additional judge of the High Court Division on 31 May 2018.

On 30 May 2020, Maniruzzaman was made a permanent Judge of the High Court Division.

In June 2021, Maniruzzaman and Justice Farah Mahbub felt embarrassed and refused to hear a petition challenging the government's appointment of 70 deputy attorneys general and 105 assistant attorneys general in July 2019. They instead referred the petition to Chief Justice Syed Mahmud Hossain. Maniruzzaman and Justice Farah Mahbub ordered the government to not identify rape victims.

In April 2022, Maniruzzaman and Justice Farah Mahbub handed over the custody of a 19 year old Canadian woman, who had been confined in Bangladesh by her parents, to the Canadian High Commission in Bangladesh. Maniruzzaman and Justice Farah Mahbub ordered the government to allow Bangladesh Nationalist Party politician Syed Moazzem Hossain Alal to travel abroad for medical treatment in a June verdict. Maniruzzaman and Justice Bhishmadev Chakrabortty ordered an investigation into the assault on the principal of Mirzapur United Degree College, Swapan Kumar Biswas.

In June 2023, Maniruzzaman and Justice Md Iqbal Kabir Lytton felt embarrassed and refused to hear 13 petitions by Grameen Kalyan and Grameen Telecom Trust challenging the government's decision to impose income tax on the two non-profits founded by Muhammad Yunus, Nobel Laureate and founder of Grameen Bank.
