= Ahmed Sohel =

Bangladeshi Judge

Justice of the High Court Division of Bangladesh
- Incumbent
- Assumed office 2002

Personal details
- Born: 13 March 1972 (age 54)
- Education: University of Dhaka
- Profession: Judge

Ahmed Sohel is a justice of the High Court Division of the Bangladesh Supreme Court.

== Early life ==
Sohel was born on 13 March 1972. His father was Justice Muhammad Ansar Ali of the Bangladesh Supreme Court. He did his undergrad and master's in geography and environment at the University of Dhaka. He did his law degree at the University of Wolverhampton and joined the Lincoln's Inn. He did a postgraduate diploma at the City, University of London in law.

== Career ==
Sohel joined the Malik and Michael legal firm in England in 2002. He worked as a lawyer for the High Court Division and the Appellate Division of the Bangladesh Supreme Court.

On 31 May 2018, Sohel was appointed an additional judge of the High Court Division.

On 30 May 2020, Sohel was made a permanent judge of the High Court Division. Sohel and Justice Md Nazrul Islam Talukder granted bail to AKMA Awal, former member of parliament and his wife in two corruption cases. In December 2020, Sohel and Justice Md Nazrul Islam Talukder asked Special Branch to submit a list of dual citizen Bangladeshis who purchased homes abroad through money laundering.

In June 2022, Jinnat Jahan Jhunu, additional district and sessions judge of Jamalpur District, apologized to a bench composed of Sohel and Justice Sheikh Md Zakir Hossain for refusing to grant bail to an accused.

Sohel and Justice Farah Mahbub questioned on what grounds Rapid Action Battalion had detained Sultana Jasmine who subsequently died in custody and were her rights to due process were respected. It sought information on the officers involved in her detention. Sohel and Justice Farah Mahbub felt embarrassed to hear a petition challenging the election of the president of Bangladesh, Mohammad Shahabuddin, and forwarded the case to the chief justice. In July 2023, Sohel and Justice Md Habibul Gani criticized Cox's Bazar District and Sessions Judge Mohammad Ismail for granting bail without following due procedures. The bench called his actions a "crime".
