= Mohammed Akhtaruzzaman (judge) =

Bangladeshi Judge

Md Akhtaruzzaman
- মো. আখতারুজ্জমান

Justice of the High Court Division of Bangladesh
- In office 21 October 2019 – 31 August 2025

Personal details
- Born: 1 January 1966 (age 60)
- Education: Ph.D. in law from the University of Dhaka
- Alma mater: University of Dhaka, University of Rajshahi
- Profession: Judge

Md Akhtaruzzaman is a former judge of the High Court Division of Bangladesh Supreme Court. He was the trial judge in the Zia Charitable Trust corruption case against former prime minister Khaleda Zia.

== Early life ==
Akhtaruzzaman was born on 1 January 1966. He completed his bachelor's degree in law from the University of Rajshahi. He did his master's in law and philosophy from the University of Dhaka, and his Ph.D. in law from the University of Dhaka.

== Career ==
Akhtaruzzaman started his legal practice at the District Courts on 27 May 1991.

On 1 April 1993, Akhtaruzzaman joined the judicial branch of the Bangladesh Civil Service and was appointed an assistant judge.

Akhtaruzzaman was promoted to district and sessions judge on 14 June 2015. He was the judge of the Special Judge's Court-5 in Dhaka.

On 30 October 2018, Akhtaruzzaman sentenced former prime minister Khaleda Zia to seven years imprisonment in the Zia Charitable Trust corruption case.

On 21 October 2019, Akhtaruzzaman was appointed an additional judge of the High Court Division.

Akhtaruzzaman was made a permanent judge of the High Court Division on 19 October 2021.

On 14 July 2022, Akhtaruzzaman granted bail to a former official of the ministry of land sentenced to five years imprisonment in a corruption case after he filed an appeal against the corruption. The Appellate Division of the Bangladesh Supreme Court criticized the verdict saying bail should not be given considering only the age of the convict. Akhtaruzzaman and Justice Zafar Ahmed of the High Court Division cancelled an order of the University of Dhaka demoting faculty member Samia Rahman for plagiarism on 4 August 2022. On 18 October, Akhtaruzzaman and Justice Zafar Ahmed ordered the government of Bangladesh to explain why its reconstitution of the board of trustees of Manarat International University should not be declared illegal. Akhtaruzzaman and Justice Zafar Ahmed declared illegal the decision of Jahangirnagar University to suspend two students for assaulting another student in November.

After the fall of the Sheikh Hasina-led Awami League government, an inquiry was launched against Akhtaruzzaman. He resigned in September 2025.
