= Bazlur Rahman =

Bazlur Rahman may refer to:

- Bazlur Mohamed Rahman (born 1959), Bangladeshi swimmer
- Bazlur Rahman (journalist) (1941–2008), Bangladeshi writer and journalist
- Bazlur Rahman Badal (1921/1922 – 2018), Bangladeshi dancer who won the Independence Day Award
- Md. Bazlur Rahman, Bangladesh High Court Judge
- Mohammad Bazlur Rahman, Bangladesh Appellate Division Judge
