= Md. Kamrul Hossain Mollah =

Banglasdeshi judge

Justice of the High Court Division of Bangladesh
- Incumbent
- Assumed office 22 February 1984

Personal details
- Born: January 1, 1960 (age 66)
- Education: University of Dhaka
- Profession: Judge

Md. Kamrul Hossain Molla is a Justice of the High Court Division of the Bangladesh Supreme Court.

== Early life ==
Mollah was born on 1 January 1960 in Parulia, Palash Upazila, Narsingdi District, East Pakistan, Pakistan. He did his bachelor's and master's in law from the University of Dhaka.

== Career ==
Mollah joined the judicial branch of the Bangladesh Civil Service on 22 February 1984 as a Munsif.

On 5 May 1997, Mollah was promoted to Joint Sessions Judge. He was promoted to Additional District Judge on 12 January 2004.

In May 2008, as Judge of the judge of the special tribunal court, Molla sentenced to two members of Jamaat-ul-Mujahideen Bangladesh to life imprisonment in an explosives case. On 28 April 2009, Molla was promoted to District and Sessions Judge. He was made a senior District Judge on 28 April 2014. In June 2015, as Metropolitan Sessions Judges Court, he issued arrest warrants against 33 politicians of Bangladesh Nationalist Party in a case over a bombing of a bus on 25 January 2015 in Mirpur Thana.

In May 2016, Mollah issued arrest warrants against former Prime Minister Khaleda Zia and 27 others in the Zia Orphanage corruption case and Zia Charitable Trust corruption case.

In April 2017, Mollah, as the Judge of the Senior Special Judge's Court, issued an arrest warrant Mayor of Comilla City Corporation Monirul Haque Sakku in a case filed by the Anti Corruption Commission. He found former President of Bangladesh, Hussain Mohammad Ershad, two former chiefs of Bangladesh Air Force, Momtaz Uddin Ahmed and Sultan Mahmud and AKM Musa, director of United Trading innocent in a 1992 corruption case related defence equipment purchase.

On 31 May 2018, Mollah was appointed an Additional Judge of the High Court Division. After his appointment, Mollah and 17 other judges went to Gopalganj to pay tribute to the founding president of Bangladesh, Sheikh Mujibur Rahman.

Mollah was made a permanent judge of the High Court Division on 30 May 2020 by President Md Abdul Hamid.

Mollah and Justice Md Mozibur Rahman Miah ordered the Bangladesh Telecommunication Regulatory Commission to remove All the Prime Minister's Men report by Al Jazeera from online sites. In June 2021, Mollah and Justice Md Mozibur Rahman Miah criticised Judicial Magistrate Enayet Ullah for not granting bail in underage accused in a rape case violating the Children Act, 2013 and ordered his withdrawal. In October 2021, Mollah and Justice Md Mozibur Rahman Mia stayed for three months a government allocation of protected forest land, 700 acre in Cox's Bazar, for construction of the Bangladesh Civil Service Academy.
