= Md. Mozibur Rahman Miah =

Bangladeshi Judge

Justice of the High Court Division of Bangladesh

Personal details
- Born: July 4, 1965 (age 60)
- Profession: Judge

Md. Mozibur Rahman Miah is a Justice of the High Court Division of the Bangladesh Supreme Court. He was a judge of the International Crimes Tribunal-2, war crimes court for crimes committed during Bangladesh Liberation War.

== Early life ==
Miah was born on 4 July 1965. He did his bachelor's and master's in law from the University of Rajshahi.

== Career ==
Miah became a Dhaka Judge Court lawyer on 9 February 1992. He started practicing in the High Court Division on 9 February 1992.

On 9 February 2009, Miah was appointed the Deputy Attorney General on 9 February 2009. He received training from the United States Department of Justice as part of the Mutual Legal Assistance Training Program.

Miah was appointed an Additional Judge in the Bangladesh High Court on 20 October 2011. On 13 December 2012, Miah was appointed to the International Crimes Tribunal-2. Miah, Justice Obaidul Hassan, and Justice Md. Shahinur Islam found Abdul Quader Molla guilty of war crimes in 2012. Miah and Justice Salma Masud Chowdhury ordered an investigation by a senior government officer into an attempt to impose fatwa in Mirsara, Chittagong District.

Miah was made a permanent judge of the High Court Division on 7 October 2013.

In May 2021, Miah wrote an article defending legal polygamy in The Daily Star. Miah and Justice Md Kamrul Hossain ordered the closure of illegal brickkilns in Chittagong District. Miah and Justice Md Kamrul Hossain Mollah stopped the elections of Bangladesh Federal Union of Journalists for two months over allegations of irregularities in the voter list. Miah and Justice Kamrul Islam Mollah issued a contempt of court verdict against Mayor of Dhaka North City Corporation Md Atiqul Islam for not reinstating an employee who was suspended after sending a legal notice demanding a promotion. Miah and Justice Md Kamrul Hossain Mollah ordered the government prevent access to unregistered Bangladeshi news websites.

Miah and Justice Khizir Hayat refused to give permission an Awami League leader to extract sand from Meghna River in Chandpur District. In August 2022, Miah and Justice Kazi Md Ejarul Haque Akondo suspended a provision of Government Service Ac which required police to seek government permission before arresting civil servants.
