= Md. Riaz Uddin Khan =

Bangladeshi judge

Justice of the High Court Division of Bangladesh
- Incumbent
- Assumed office 1 April 1995

Personal details
- Born: December 15, 1970 (age 55)
- Education: University of Dhaka
- Profession: Judge

Md. Riaz Uddin Khan is a Justice of the High Court Division of the Bangladesh Supreme Court.

== Early life ==
Khan was born on 15 December 1970. He did his bachelor's and master's at the University of Dhaka.

== Career ==
Khan started working as a lawyer at the District Courts on 1 April 1995. He became a lawyer of the High Court Division 29 September 1996.

In May 2011, Khan became a lawyer of the Appellate Division of the Bangladesh Supreme Court.

President Mohammad Abdul Hamid appointed Khan an Additional Judge of the High Court Division on 31 May 2018.

In August 2019, Khan and Justice Jahangir Hossain Selim ordered Bangladesh Police to not harass four journalists in Feni District or arrest them in nine cases filed in four separate police stations on charges of subversive acts and vandalism filed before the 2018 Bangladeshi general election.

On 30 May 2020, Khan was made a permanent judge of the High Court Division. In November 2020, Khan and Justice Md Habibul Gani granted anticipatory to 120 Bangladesh Nationalist Party politicians in 11 cases filed for arsons attack on buses in Dhaka.

Khan and Justice Md Habibul Gani granted anticipatory bail to 74 Bangladesh Nationalist Party politicians, including Aman Ullah Aman and Mizanur Rahman Minu, in August 2021 in a case filed over attacking police at Chandrima Uddan. Khan and Justice Md Habibul Gani stopped a labour law violation case against Dr Muhammad Yunus, noble laurate, for six months in December.

In January 2023, Khan and Justice Md Salim granted a six-month bail to Bangladesh Nationalist Party politicians, Mirza Abbas and Mirza Fakhrul Islam Alamgir in a case over clashes between Bangladesh Nationalist Party activists and the police on 7 December 2022. Khan and Justice Md Salim granted anticipatory bail to 25 pro-Bangladesh Nationalist Party lawyers over violence at the Bangladesh Supreme Court Bar Association.

In July 2023, Khan was placed in a special bench to hear formed to hold hearing on old bail petitions at the High Court.
