= Hamidur Rahman (disambiguation) =

Hamidur Rahman (1953–1971) was a sepoy in Bangladesh Army during the 1971 Bangladesh Liberation War, posthumously awarded Bir Sreshtho.

Hamidur Rahman may also refer to:

- Hamidur Rahman (artist) (1928–1988), Bangladeshi artist and sculptor
- Hamidul Rahman (b. 1959), Indian politician
- A. H. M. Hamidur Rahman Azad (b. 1965), Bangladesh Jamaat-e-Islami politician
- Hamidur Rahman Remon (b. 1990), Bangladeshi footballer
- Hamid Ur Rahman, Pakistani politician from Swat District
- Hamid Ur Rehman, Pakistani politician from Bajaur District
- Md. Hamidur Rahman, Bangladeshi justice
- Hamidur Rahman (Bangladeshi politician), Bangladesh Nationalist Party politician
