= Md. Mahmud Hassan Talukder =

Bangladeshi judge

The Honourable Md. Mahmud Hassan Talukder

Justice of the High Court Division of Bangladesh
- Incumbent
- Assumed office 10 December 1989

Personal details
- Born: 7 January 1966 (age 60)
- Education: University of Dhaka
- Profession: Judge

Md. Mahmud Hassan Talukder is a Justice of the High Court Division of the Bangladesh Supreme Court.

== Early life ==
Talukder was born on 7 January 1966. He has an LLB and a Master in Art from the University of Dhaka.

== Career ==
Talukder became a lawyer of the District Courts on 10 December 1989 and the High Court Division on 31 December 1991.

On 21 October 2019, Talukder was appointed an additional Judge of the High Court Division.

In January 2020, Talukder and Justice Sheikh Hassan Arif stayed the recruitment of primary school teachers in 14 districts following a petition filed by failed candidates. This was expanded to four more districts. Talukder and Justice Sheikh Hassan Arif cancelled all convictions of juveniles by executive magistrates across Bangladesh. The court also ordered the release of all juveniles detained on orders of executive magistrate. On 8 December 2020, Talukder and Justice Md. Khasruzzaman ordered the government to block all online portals owned by Kanak Sarwar for anti-state propaganda.

On 19 October 2021, Talukder was made a permanent Judge of the High Court Division by President Mohammad Abdul Hamid.
