= Md. Abdul Mannan (judge) =

Bangladeshi judge

Justice of the High Court Division of Bangladesh

Personal details
- Profession: Judge

Md. Abdul Mannan is a judge of the High Court Division of the Bangladesh Supreme Court.

== Career ==
Abdul Mannan was the District and Sessions Judge of Pirojpur District when he was stand released, or terminated, from his job in 2020 on charges of corruption. This took place after he sent A. K. M. A. Awal Saydur Rahman, former member of parliament of the Awami League, and his wife to jail in a corruption case. Justice Tariq ul Hakim and Justice Md Iqbal Kabir questioned the government why his removal should not be declared illegal. The decision was heavily criticised by lawyers and civil society.

Abdul Mannan and 22 others were appointed Judges of the High Court Division on 9 October 2024 following the fall of the Sheikh Hasina-led Awami League government.
