= Sashanka Shekhar Sarkar =

Bangladeshi judge

Justice of the High Court Division of Bangladesh

Personal details
- Profession: Judge

Shashanka Shekhar Sarkar is a Bangladeshi jurist and justice of the High Court Division of the Bangladesh Supreme Court since 2018.

== Early life ==
Sarkar was born on 6 June 1968 in a Bengali Hindu family. He acquired an LL.B. and LL.M. from the University of Dhaka.

== Career ==
Sarkar became a lawyer at the Dhaka District Court on 15 September 1992. He became a lawyer of the High Court Division on 22 January 1994.

In February 2009, President Iajuddin Ahmed appointed Sarkar deputy attorney general. In October 2010, Sarkar represented the Attorney General of Bangladesh at a special court of the Bangladesh Rifles in Chapai Nawabganj District for the trial of 30 soldiers accused of participating in the Bangladesh Rifles mutiny. He also represented the Attorney General of Bangladesh at the Satkhira District special court of Bangladesh Rifles for the trial of 105 mutineers of the 41 Rifles Battalion. He became a lawyer of the Appellate Division of the Bangladesh Supreme Court on 28 December 2010.

In 2016, Sarkar was the prosecutor of the 2005 Netrokona bombing at the Bangladesh Supreme Court which upheld the death penalty against the main accused, a member of the Jama'atul Mujahideen Bangladesh.

On 31 May 2018, Sarkar was appointed an additional judge of the High Court Division by President Md Abdul Hamid. His oath was taken a second time at the office of Chief Justice Syed Mahmud Hossain after the first virtual ceremony failed due to technical problems. He and the 17 judges paid tribute to Sheikh Mujibur Rahman at his mausoleum in Tungipara. In August 2019, Sarkar requested a VIP protocol, a flag car, police escort, and fuel, through the Supreme Court's deputy registrar to visit his village home from the Deputy Commissioner of Khulna District Mohammad Helal Hossain.

In May 2019, Sarkar and Justice Zubaer Rahman Chowdhury ordered news television channels to stop airing advertisement in the headlines.

Sarkar was made a permanent judge of the High Court Division on 30 May 2020.
