= Md. Atabullah =

Bangladeshi judge (born 1963)

Justice of the High Court Division of Bangladesh

Personal details
- Born: 1 November 1963 (age 62)
- Profession: Judge

Md. Atabullah (born 1 November 1963) is a judge of the High Court Division of the Bangladesh Supreme Court. He is a former District Sessions judge.

== Early life ==
Atabullah was born on 1 November 1963 in Bhanua, Gazipur District, East Pakistan, Pakistan. He completed his SSC from Gazipur Cantonment Board High School and HSC from Dhaka College. He did his bachelor's and master's in law from the University of Dhaka in 1985 and 1987, respectively.

== Career ==
Atabullah joined the judicial branch of the Bangladesh Civil Service as an assistant judge on 15 February 1988.

Atabullah served as the deputy director of the Judicial Administration Training Institute. He worked in the DANIDA-JATI Project as deputy director.

In November 2018, Narsingdi District and session judge Atabullah sent Bangladesh Nationalist Party politician Khairul Kabir Khokon to jail in connection with two sabotage cases.

Dhaka Metropolitan Judge Atabullah rejected the bail petition of a police sub-inspector who had framed a man with Ya ba drugs with two police informants. He was made an additional judge of the High Court Division on 31 July 2022 along with 10 others. He and the newly appointed judges met with President Mohammad Abdul Hamid after their appointment. In September, Atabullah and Justice Md Rezaul Hasan issued a suo moto ruling on the lynch mob killing of Taslima Begum Renu, a single mother who had gone to Badda to admit her children to a school there, on suspicion of being a kidnapper. The bench called for exemplary punishment for all involved in the lynch mob killing.
