= Biswajit Debnath =

Bangladeshi judge

Justice of the High Court Division of Bangladesh

Personal details
- Profession: Judge

Biswajit Debnath is a judge of the High Court Division of the Bangladesh Supreme Court.

== Early life ==
Debnath was born on 1 April 1963 in a Bengali Hindu family. He did his bachelor's and master's of law from the University of Rajshahi.

== Career ==
Debnath registered with the Bangladesh Bar Council on 10 May 1992. He became a lawyer of the High Court Division on 1 February 1997.

On 8 February 2009, Debnath was appointed a Deputy Attorney General of Bangladesh.

In October 2016, Debnath was sent to Munishganj District to ensure the security of Durga Puja.

Debnath became a lawyer of the Appellate Division of the Bangladesh Supreme Court on 1 March 2018.

In April 2021, Debnath represented the state at the hearing of Erfan Selim, son of Awami League member of parliament Haji Selim, for assaulting a Bangladesh Navy officer.

Debnath served as the Deputy Attorney General till 30 July 2022. He was appointed an additional judge of the High Court Division on 31 July.

In May 2023, Debnath and Justice Sheikh Hassan Arif passed a verdict prohibiting employees of Bangladesh High Court from accepting tips or gratuity and taking it will be treated as corruption.
