= Kazi Ebadoth Hossain =

Bangladeshi judge

Justice of the High Court Division of Bangladesh

Personal details
- Profession: Judge

Kazi Ebadoth Hossain is a Justice of the High Court Division of the Bangladesh Supreme Court.

== Early life ==
Hossain was born on 1 October 1969. He did his bachelor's and master's in law from the University of Dhaka.

== Career ==
Hossain became a lawyer in the district court in 1993 and the High Court Division in 2003. He was a member of the Dhaka University LLM Lawyers' Association.

On 21 October 2019, Hossain was appointed an additional judge of the High Court Division.

On 19 October 2021, Hossain was made a permanent judge of the High Court Division by President Mohammad Abdul Hamid.

In April 2022, Hossain and Justice Md Rezaul Hasan confirmed the death penalty in the Mymensingh double murder.

In January 2023, Hossain and Justice Zubayer Rahman Chowdhury in a verdict declared Jatiya Muktijoddha Council has no authority to cancel the names of "Freedom Fighter" from gazette notification.
