= S. M. Maniruzzaman =

S. M. Maniruzzaman may refer to:

- S. M. Maniruzzaman (judge)
- S. M. Moniruzzaman (admiral)
