= Md. Habibul Gani =

Bangladeshi judge

The Honourable Md. Habibul Gani

Justice of the Supreme Court of Bangladesh
- Incumbent
- Assumed office 3 April 1989

Personal details
- Born: 31 May 1962 (age 64)
- Education: University of Chittagong
- Profession: Judge

Md. Habibul Gani is a judge on the High Court Division of Bangladesh Supreme Court.

== Early life ==
Habibul Gani was born on 31 May 1962. He completed an M.S.S and a law degree from the University of Chittagong.

== Career ==
Habibul Gani became a lawyer of the district courts on 3 April 1989.

On 11 April 1992, Habibul Gani became a lawyer of the High Court Division of Bangladesh Supreme Court.

Habibul Gani was appointed an additional judge of the High Court Division of Bangladesh Supreme Court on 18 April 2010.

Habibul Gani became a permanent judge of the High Court Division on 15 April 2012.

On 11 January 2015, three bombs, weighing 500 grams, were recovered from the courtroom of Habibul Gani and Justice Zinat Ara.

On 17 December 2017, Habibul Gani and Justice KM Kamrul Kader issued a sua sponte ruling on the legality of the assistant commissioner of land and executive magistrate of Dinajpur, Biroda Rani Roy, sentencing a lawyer, Nirod Bihari Roy, to imprisonment and fined him 500 taka. The incident stemmed from a sitting dispute at the office of the Upazila Land Office. Biroda Rani Roy apologized to the court unconditionally for her actions.

On 11 September 2020, Habibul Gani and Justice Md Badruzzaman issued a verdict that stated the lower courts could not cancel the bail of someone who had been granted bail by the High Court unless there was evidence that the conditions of bail were broken.

On 22 September 2021, Habibul Gani and Justice Md Riaz Uddin Khan refused bail to Moazzem Hossain, officer in charge of Sonagazi Police Station, who had been jailed for eight years. Hossain had recorded the death statement of the victim in the murder of Nusrat Jahan Rafi and circulated the video without the victim's consent. In December 2021, Habibul Gani and Md Riaz Uddin Khan issued a stay of six months on a labor law case against Muhammad Yunus, founder of Grameen Bank and Nobel Peace Prize winner. The case was filed by Arifuzzaman, inspector of Department of Inspection for Factories and Establishments for not making permanent and providing due benefits to 101 workers of Grameen Communications.

On 25 January 2022, Habibul Gani and Justice SM Mozibur Rahman refused bail to journalist Kanak Sarwar's sister, Nusrat Shahrin Raka, on a drug case.
