= Md. Ali Reza =

Bangladeshi judge

Justice of the High Court Division of Bangladesh

Personal details
- Profession: Judge

Md. Ali Reza is a Justice of the High Court Division of the Bangladesh Supreme Court.

== Early life ==
Reza was born on 23 January 1964. He did his Bachelor of law from the University of Rajshahi and Master of law from the University of Dhaka.

== Career ==
Reza started his career as a lawyer on 3 April 1989 in the Jhenaidah District Court. He became a lawyer of the High Court Division on 27 May 1993.

Reza became a lawyer of the Appellate Division of the Supreme Court of Bangladesh on 12 May 2011.

Reza was appointed an additional Judge of the High Court Division on 31 July 2022 by President Mohammad Abdul Hamid. He and the other ten newly appointed judges travelled to Tungipara in Gopalganj District to pay homage to the founding president of Bangladesh, Sheikh Mujibur Rahman.

Reza and Justice Bhishmadev Chakraborty ordered the government of Bangladesh to stop construction of the housing project for journalists in Cox's Bazar District by cutting a hill following a petition by the Bangladesh Environmental Lawyers Association. In August 2023, Reza and Justice Bhishmadev Chakraborty ordered a stay on the suspension order of Comilla University student for writing a news article on a speech made by the vice-chancellor of Comilla University AFM Abdul Moyeen on corruption. The student, a correspondent of Jaijaidin, had written an article about the speech which the university claimed was fabricated.
