= Md. Khairul Alam =

Bangladeshi judge

- মো. খায়রুল আলম

Justice of the High Court Division of Bangladesh
- Incumbent
- Assumed office 3 March 1997

Personal details
- Born: November 15, 1971 (age 54)
- Profession: Judge

Md Khairul Alam is a Justice of the High Court Division of the Bangladesh Supreme Court.

== Early life ==
Khairul Alam was born on 15 November 1971. He has a Bachelor of Laws and a Master of Laws.

== Career ==
Khairul Alam became a lawyer of the District Courts on 3 March 1997 and the High Court Division on 30 October 1997.

Khairul Alam was appointed an additional judge of the High Court Division on 31 May 2018. In July, Khairul Alam and Justice ABM Hassan dismissed the bail petition of Badal Farazi, who had been convicted and sentenced to life imprisonment for murder in India and was bought back to Bangladesh to serve the rest of his sentence. In December, Khairul Alam and Justice ABM Hassan cleared the way for 25 Bangladesh Jamaat-e-Islami politicians to stand for the 2018 Bangladeshi general election. Khairul Alam and Justice ABM Hassan issued a stay order on the candidacy of Tahsina Rushdir Luna, wife of Ilias Ali, and M. Rashiduzzaman Millat of the Bangladesh Nationalist Party following a petitions by the Awami League candidate and Jatiya Party candidate. Luna as a retired civil servant needed to wait three years before standing for election and Millat was previously convicted in a corruption case. Khairul Alam and Justice ABM Hassan canceled the candidacy of Bangladesh Nationalist Party politician Afroza Khan Rita for defaulting on a 18 billion BDT loan.

In July 2019, Khairul Alam and Justice JBM Hassan ordered Dhaka Water Supply and Sewerage Authority to provide safe drinking water.

On 30 May 2020, Khairul Alam was made a permanent judge of the High Court Division by President Mohammad Abdul Hamid. In August 2020, Khairul Alam and Justice JBM Hassan rejected a petition calling for action against two police officers, Superintendents of Police Mostafijur Rahman and Mohammad Mizanur Rahman Shelley, who had posted negative comments on Facebook against a witness in the Murder of Major Sinha Mohammed Rashed Khan case on a technicality. In September, Khairul Alam and Justice JBM Hassan issued a six months stay order on the government order cancelling the freedom fighter status of 120 personnel of Bangladesh Air Force and Bangladesh Rifles out of nearly 1200 whose status was cancelled on the grounds of using forged documents to obtain freedom fighter status.

In February 2023, Khairul Alam and Justice Naima Haider issued a verdict declaring educational institutions cannot compel students to disclose their marital status in the admission forms.
