= Mohammad Showkat Ali Chowdhury =

Bangladeshi judge

Justice of the High Court Division of Bangladesh

Personal details
- Profession: Judge

Mohammad Showkat Ali Chowdhury is a judge of the High Court Division of the Bangladesh Supreme Court.

== Early life ==
Chowdhury was born on 6 October 1962. He has a bachelor's and master of law from the University of Dhaka.

== Career ==
Chowdhury became a lawyer in the District Courts in 1986. On 15 February 1988, he joined the judicial branch of the Bangladesh Civil Service.

Chowdhury was promoted on 12 October 2012 to District and Sessions Judge.

In December 2020, Dhaka District and Sessions Judge Chowdhury ordered an injunction on the usage of facebook.com.bd by A-1 Software Limited, a Bangladeshi company owned by SK Shamsul Islam, following a petition by Facebook.

On 31 July 2021, Chowdhury was appointed an additional judge of the High Court Division. He and the ten other newly appointed judges went to Tungipara to pay homage at the mausoleum of former President Sheikh Mujibur Rahman.

In May 2023, Chowdhury and Justice KM Kamrul Kader asked the Legislative and Parliamentary Affairs Division to explain why laws still had Pakistan and East Pakistan written in them despite Bangladesh becoming an independent country. Chowdhury and Justice KM Kamrul Kader summoned the Narayanganj District Commissioner for failure to demolish illegal brickkilns following a verdict of the court. Chowdhury and Justice KM Kamrul Kader ordered all 16 cases, filed in different districts, against Bangladesh Nationalist Party politician Abu Sayeed Chand for allegedly making death threats against Prime Minister Sheikh Hasina be heard in a single court case in Rajshahi.
