= Md. Ashraful Kamal =

Bangladeshi Justice

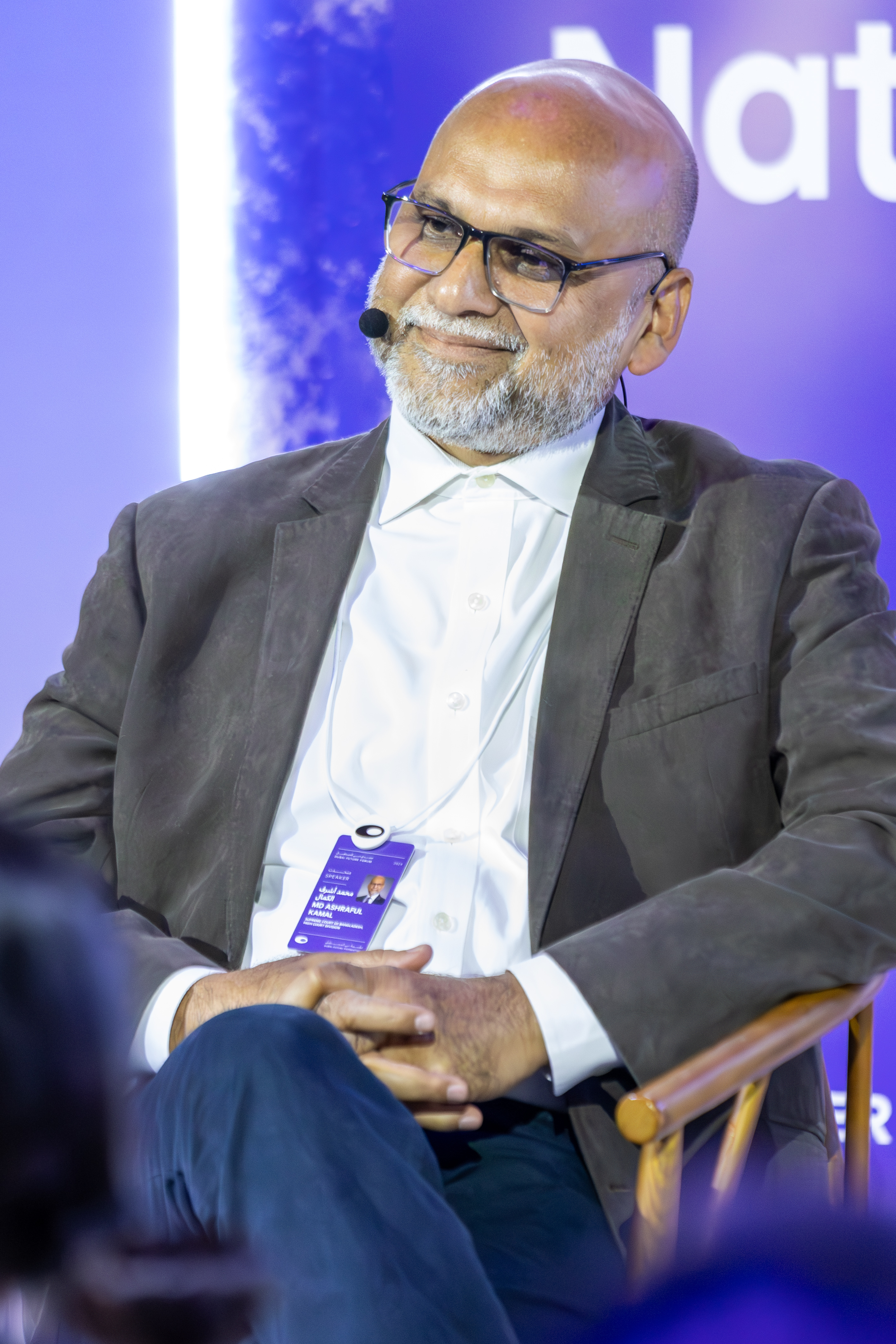
- Md. Ashraful Kamal at the Dubai Future Forum (2024)

Justice of the High Court Division of Bangladesh

Personal details
- Citizenship: Bangladesh
- Profession: Judge

Md. Ashraful Kamal is a Justice in the High Court Division of the Bangladesh Supreme Court.

== Early life ==
Ashraful Kamal was born on 3 November 1964. He obtained his bachelor's degree in law and master's in commerce at the University of Dhaka.

== Career ==
Ashraful Kamal started his legal practice on 30 April 1994. He became a lawyer of the High Court Division on 26 September 1996. Ashraful Kamal became a lawyer of the Bangladesh Supreme Court on 24 August 2010.

He was appointed an additional judge of the High Court Division on 12 December 2010. On 10 December 2012, Ashraful Kamal was made a permanent judge of the High Court Division.

Justice Moyeenul Islam Chowdhury and Ashraful Kamal scrapped a provision of the Anti Corruption Commission Act that curtailed the independence of the commissioners in 2015. He and Justice Chowdhury issued a split verdict challenging the parliamentary membership of Mofazzal Hossain Chowdhury Maya, who had been convicted in a corruption case. Chowdhury asked Maya for an explanation, while Ashraful Kamal rejected the petition.

In September 2014, Ashraful Kamal, alongside Justice Md. Ashfaqul Islam, superseded the trademark rights of a previously existing company over the British Broadcasting Company (BBC) according to international law.

In March 2016, Ashraful Kamal, Justice Naima Haider, and Justice Quazi Reza-Ul Hoque rejected a petition that challenged the making of Islam the state religion of Bangladesh in 1988.

Ashraful Kamal and Justice Moyeenul Islam Chowdhury ordered the government of Bangladesh to collect taxes from Google. In October 2018, Ashraful Kamal gave a split verdict with Justice Moyeenul Islam Chowdhury on a petition challenging the "fictitious" case filed by the Government of Bangladesh against politicians of the opposition Bangladesh Nationalist Party. Chowdhury sought an explanation from the government why it should not be declared illegal, while Ashraful Kamal said the cases could not be called fictitious and should be properly investigated.

In February 2019, Ashraful Kamal and Justice Moyeenul Islam Chowdhury issued a 17-point verdict on protecting rivers of Bangladesh, such as preventing those involved in illegal occupation of riverbanks from receiving loans or standing for elections. Justice Moyeenul Islam Chowdhury and Ashraful Kamal in a verdict recognized the Turag River as a living entity and ordered the eviction of encroachers. The verdict scrapped a lease by A. K. Azad of the Ha-meem Group on the banks of the river by the Gazipur administration. Ashraful Kamal and Justice Moyeenul Islam Chowdhury asked the government to take action to prevent unnecessary C-sections in June 2019.

In 2021, a virtual bench of the High Court Division of Justice Md. Ashraful Kamal and Justice Razik-Al-Jalil delivered a verdict declaring the Hatirjheel-Begunbari project a public trust.

In 2022, a High Court bench headed by Justice Md. Ashraful Kamal delivered a historic verdict, stating that the right of every citizen of Bangladesh to free and unadulterated medical treatment is a constitutional fundamental right and the government must take effective steps to ensure it.

In June 2023, Ashraful Kamal upheld the five-year jail sentence of Md Bazlur Rashid, Deputy Inspector General of Prisons, in a 31.4 million Bangladeshi taka corruption case.

In June 2024, Justice Md. Ashraful Kamal was invited to the Dubai Future Forum held in Dubai, United Arab Emirates. He delivered an important keynote speech on river protection and environmental sustainability, where he emphasized the urgent need for cross-border cooperation to protect rivers from pollution and encroachment. His speech highlighted legal, environmental, and humanitarian aspects of waterway conservation.

In 2020, the High Court bench of Justice Md. Ashraful Kamal and Justice Razik-Al Jalil ruled that all activities of Unique Property Development (UPDL) and the Sonargaon Economic Zone (SEZ) to fill wetlands, agricultural lands, and water bodies in Sonargaon were illegal.

On 1 January 2026, the High Court published the full written verdict of a judgment declaring free access to safe and pure drinking water to be a fundamental right under Article 32 of the Constitution, as an integral component of the right to life, and affirming the state’s constitutional obligation to ensure this right for all citizens. The judgment arose from a suo motu rule issued in 2020 and was originally delivered in February 2025, directing the government to ensure the availability of safe drinking water at major public places within one year and to establish nationwide systems within ten years to guarantee free access to safe drinking water and affordable potable water for other uses, while also ordering the protection of water sources from pollution, depletion, and degradation and requiring the submission of a progress report on implementation.
