= Khizir Ahmed Choudhury =

Bangladeshi judge

Justice of the High Court Division of Bangladesh

Personal details
- Profession: Judge

Khizir Ahmed Choudhury is a judge on the High Court Division of Bangladesh Supreme Court.

== Early life ==
Chowdhury was born on 24 November 1959. He completed a bachelor's of art degree and a bachelor of law degree.

== Career ==
On 18 March 1986, Chowdhury became an advocate of the district court.

Chowdhury became a lawyer of the High Court Division on 30 April 1989 and lawyer of the Appellate Division on 13 December 2009.

Chowdhury was appointed an additional judge of the High Court Division on 12 February 2015. He is a member of the Supreme Court's Special Committee for Child Rights.

On 4 April 2016, Chowdhury and Justice Naima Haider issued an order that heirs not nominees are to receive money from the bank account of a deceased individual.

Chowdhury and Justice Naima Haider ordered the removal of the word kumari (virgin) and replaced it with unmarried on Muslim marriage registration on 25 August 2019.
