= A. K. M. Rabiul Hassan =

Bangladeshi judge

The Honourable A. K. M. Rabiul Hassan

Justice of the High Court Division of Bangladesh
- Incumbent
- Assumed office 5 August 2003

Personal details
- Born: 30 October 1974 (age 52)
- Education: University of Wolverhampton
- Profession: Judge

A. K. M. Rabiul Hassan is a Justice of the High Court Division of the Bangladesh Supreme Court.

== Early life ==
Rabiul Hassan was born on 30 October 1974. He did his Bachelor of Law from the University of Wolverhampton. He did a Bar Vocational Course from Northumbria University. He then joined Lincoln's Inn.

== Career ==
Rabiul Hassan joined the district court on 5 August 2003 and the High Court Division on 20 April 2005.

On 29 March 2018, Rabiul Hassan became a lawyer of the Appellate Division of the Supreme Court of Bangladesh.

Rabiul Hassan was appointed an additional Judge of the Bangladesh High Court on 31 July 2022 by President Mohammad Abdul Hamid. He and the 10 other judges paid respect to the founding President Sheikh Mujibur Rahman in Gopalganj District after their appointment.

Rabiul Hassan and Justice Abu Taher Md Saifur Rahman summoned M Amir Hossain Chowdhury, the Chief Conservator of Forests, in August 2022 for disobeying an order of the court. In December 2022, Rabiul Hassan and Justice Abu Taher Md Saifur Rahman criticized the bureaucrats while at the contempt of court hearing of deputy secretary of the Ministry of Local Government, Rural Development and Co-operatives, Md Abdur Rahma.

In February 2023, Rabiul Hassan and Justice Abu Taher Md Saifur Rahman expressed disappointment with bureaucrats not following orders of the court and refused to hear a contempt of court petition against the secretary of the ministry of environment. Rabiul Hassan and Justice Abu Taher Md Saifur Rahman summoned a politician of Awami League for allegedly poisoning 50 palm trees illegally in Bagmara upazila. The bench had him stand in court for a few hours and criticized him for killing the trees. In April, Rabiul Hassan and Justice Iqbal Kabir granted bail to 24 lawyers aligned with the Bangladesh Nationalist Party in a vandalism case.
