= Sikder Mahmudur Razi =

Bangladeshi judge

The Honourable Justice Shikder Mahmudur Razi

Justice of the High Court Division of Bangladesh

Personal details
- Profession: Judge

Justice Sikder Mahmudur Razi is a judge of the High Court Division of Bangladesh Supreme Court.

== Career ==
Mahmudur Razi, along with 22 others, were appointed Judges of the High Court Division on 9 October 2024 following the fall of the Sheikh Hasina led Awami League government. He and Justice Fatema Najib stayed the appointment of 6,531 candidates for assistant teachers of government primary schools.
