= S. M. Kuddus Zaman =

Bangladeshi Judge

Justice of the High Court Division of Bangladesh
- Incumbent
- Assumed office 22 February 1984

Personal details
- Born: August 12, 1960 (age 65)
- Profession: Judge

S. M. Kuddus Zaman is a Justice of the High Court Division of the Bangladesh Supreme Court.

== Early life ==
Zaman was born on 12 August 1960 in Bhabanipur, Rajbari District, East Pakistan, Pakistan. He graduated from Rajbari Government High School and Rajbari Government College in 1975 and 1978, respectively. He completed his bachelor's and master's in law from the University of Dhaka in 1982 and 1983, respectively.

== Career ==
Zaman joined the judicial branch of the Bangladesh Civil Service on 22 February 1984 as a munsif. He was promoted to Senior Assistant Judge and Joint District Judge.

From March to April 2006, Zaman visited the United States as part of the Ministry of Law, Justice and Parliamentary Affairs to study the Plea bargain system. He was promoted to District Judge on 9 October 2006. He was the Registrar of the Bangladesh Supreme Court. In January, he sent a letter to the Dhaka Metropolitan Police requesting extra security after bombs were recovered from premises of the Bangladesh Supreme Court and Chapainawabganj District court. He was the director of the Judicial Strengthening Project sponsored by the United Nations Development Programme.

Zaman was appointed the District Judge of Dhaka District on 5 February 2015.

Zaman indicted Sohel Rana and 40 others in the collapse of Rana Plaza. In November 2016, Zaman sentenced four police officers from the Government Railway Police Station to 10 years imprisonment for robbing a man near Hazrat Shahjalal International Airport.

Zaman was appointed an additional judge of the High Court Division on 31 May 2018. In July, Zaman and Justice Obaidul Hassan rejected the bail application Mahabubul Haque Chisty, former audit chief of the Farmers Bank.

In February 2019, Zaman and Justice Obaidul Hassan denied bail to Tufan Sarker, Sramik League convener of Bogura District, in a rape and torture case. Zaman and Justice Obaidul Hassan fined Md Feroz Alam, a former Feni District Court Judge, for contempt of court for failure to provide protocol to High Court Justice Syed Amirul Islam. In March, Zaman and Justice Mamnoon Rahman withdrew the bail to former Awami League leader Ruhul Amin for ordering a rape for withholding information in bail appeal. Zaman and Justice Obaidul Hassan rejected the bail application of former Prime Minister Khaleda Zia in the Zia Charitable Trust corruption case in July.

Zaman was appointed to the Search Committee, 2022 to recommend commissioners for the Bangladesh Election Commission. In July, Zaman and Justice K. M. Zahid Sarwar Kazal granted bail to Mohammad Shahed, Chairman of Regent Hospital, in a loan default case from Farmers Bank. Zaman and Justice Fahmida Quader granted bail to two former trustee board members of North South University, M. A. Kashem and Rehana Rahman, in a 3.04 billion BDT money laundering case in November.

Zaman and Justice Fahmida Quader stayed a Digital Security Act case against singer Rita Dewan for "derogatory" comments about religion in January 2023. Zaman and Justice Shahed Nuruddin denied bail to former Deputy Inspector General Md Mizanur Rahman.
