= Tamanna Rahman =

Bangladeshi judge

Justice of the High Court Division of Bangladesh

Personal details
- Profession: Judge

Tamanna Rahman is a judge of the High Court Division of Bangladesh Supreme Court.

== Early life ==
Rahman's father is Touhid Imroze Khalidi. Her uncle, Toufique Imrose Khalidi, was the chief editor of Bdnews24.com from 2006 to 2026.

== Career ==
Rahman joined the Dhaka Bar Association in 1994.

Rahman, along with 22 others, were appointed Judges of the High Court Division on 9 October 2024 following the fall of the Sheikh Hasina led Awami League government.
