= K. M. Rasheduzzaman Raja =

Bangladeshi judge

Justice of the High Court Division of Bangladesh

Personal details
- Profession: Judge

K. M. Rasheduzzaman Raja is a judge of the High Court Division of Bangladesh Supreme Court.

== Career ==
In 2005, Raja was the Joint District Judge of Sirajganj District.

Raja, along with 22 others, were appointed Judges of the High Court Division on 9 October 2024 following the fall of the Sheikh Hasina led Awami League government.
