= Syed Enayet Hossain =

Bangladeshi judge

Justice of the High Court Division of Bangladesh

Personal details
- Profession: Judge

Syed Enayet Hossain is a judge of the High Court Division of Bangladesh Supreme Court.

== Career ==
In September 2011, Hossain was transferred from the post of the Narayanganj women and children repression prevention tribunal judge to member of administrative tribunal No 3. He sentenced 26 people to death in the Seven Murders of the Narayanganj in January 2017.

Hossain, along with 22 others, were appointed Judges of the High Court Division on 9 October 2024 following the fall of the Sheikh Hasina led Awami League government. He and Justice AKM Asaduzzaman acquitted all the accused in the 2004 Dhaka Grenade Attack on former prime minister Sheikh Hasina in December 2024. He and Justice AKM Asaduzzaman acquitted Gias Uddin Al Mamun in a money laundering case.
