= Mustafa Zaman Islam =

Bangladeshi Judge

Justice of the High Court Division of Bangladesh

Personal details
- Profession: Judge

Mustafa Zaman Islam is a justice of the High Court Division of the Bangladesh Supreme Court.

== Early life ==
Islam was born on 10 February 1960. He did his undergraduate and graduate studies in law.

== Career ==
Islam started his legal practice on 19 May 1991 in the District Courts. On 13 March 1993, Islam became a lawyer in the High Court Division. He participated in the 1996 SAARC law conference.

Islam and five other lawyers of the Supreme Court filed a petition against Jamaat-e-Islami Bangladesh using scales as its election symbol as they claimed it was a symbol of the courts in May 2006.

Islam was appointed deputy attorney general of Bangladesh in February 2009.

Islam became a lawyer of the Appellate Division on 28 December 2010. He was appointed as an additional judge of the High Court Division on 20 October 2011. In September 2012, Islam and Justice Hasan Foez Siddique questioned the government's failure to increase the retirement age of teachers who were veterans of Bangladesh Liberation War despite issuing a gazette notification on 31 December 2009 to do so. Islam was made a permanent judge of the High Court Division on 7 October 2013.

Chief Justice Surendra Kumar removed Islam from the Bangladesh Rifles Mutiny verdict appeal hearing and replaced him with Justice Nazrul Islam Talukder. In August 2015, Islam and Justice Naima Haider ordered the government to send detained Bangladesh Nationalist Party politician Rizvi Ahmed to hospital.

Islam and Justice Bhabani Prasad Singha upheld the verdict of the Narayanganj Seven murder case committed by members of Rapid Action Battalion in August 2017 while also defending the law enforcement agency in their verdict.

In September 2021, Islam and Justice K. M. Zahid Sarwar in a verdict declared that the lower courts violated the rules by placing Pori Moni in police custody multiple times for questioning. They criticized the conduct of the lower court judges in the case. The magistrates of the lower courts apologized to the High Court bench for their actions.

In April 2023, Islam and Justice Md Aminul Islam granted bail to the editor of Prothom Alo, Matiur Rahman, in a Digital Security Act case. Islam and Justice Md. Aminul Islam also granted bail to Islamic preacher, Rafiqul Islam Madani, in four Digital Security Act cases filed in Dhaka and Gazipur in March 2023. In May, Islam and Justice Md Aminul Islam granted bail to the former joint secretary general of Hefazat-e-Islam Bangladesh, Mamunul Haque, is five cases.
