= Md. Jabid Hossain =

Bangladeshi judge

Md. Jahid Hossain

Justice of the High Court Division of Bangladesh

Personal details
- Profession: Judge

Md. Jabid Hossain is a judge of the High Court Division of Bangladesh Supreme Court.

== Career ==
Hossain was the District and Session Judge of Dinajpur District.

Hossain, along with 22 others, were appointed Judges of the High Court Division on 9 October 2024 following the fall of the Sheikh Hasina led Awami League government.
