= Zafar Ahmed =

Bangladesh judge

Justice of the High Court Division of Bangladesh

Personal details
- Born: January 4, 1970 (age 56)
- Profession: Judge

Zafar Ahmed is a Justice of the High Court Division of the Bangladesh Supreme Court.

== Early life ==
Ahmed was born on 4 January 1970. He did his bachelor's and master's in law from the University of Dhaka. He completed a second law degree from London Metropolitan University. He did a bar vocational course at BPP University.

== Career ==
In 1994, Ahmed became a lawyer in the district courts. He became a lawyer in the High Court Division next year in 1995.

Ahmed was appointed an Additional Judge of the High Court Division on 14 June 2012.

On 12 June 2014, Ahmed was made a permanent judge of the High Court Division.

In June 2015, Ahmed and Justice Md Nuruzzaman allowed the Niko corruption case against former Prime Minister Khaleda Zia. In September, Ahmed and Justice Md Ashfaqul Islam declared the parliamentary membership of ASM Feroz legal following a petition calling it to be declared invalid allegedly due to defaulting on loans.

In October 2017, Ahmed and Justice Md. Miftah Uddin Choudhury halting proceedings against Mirza Fakhrul Islam Alamgir, General Secretary of Bangladesh Nationalist Party, in a vandalism case from 2015. The bench also granted bail to four other politicians of the Bangladesh Nationalist Party, Amanullah Aman, Habib-un-Nabi Khan Sohel, Khairul Kabir Khokon, and Rafiqul Alam Majnu.

Ahmed and Justice Md. Rezaul Haque granted anticipatory bail to Bangladesh Nationalist Party politician Mirza Abbas and his wife Afroja Abbas on 19 November 2018 in three cases over violence and attacking Bangladesh Police personnel in Nayapaltan filed on 14 November.

In January 2019, Ahmed and Justice Rezaul Haque granted bail to Barrister Mainul Hosein in 11 defamation cases filed over his remarks on journalist Masuda Bhatti on a television talk show.

In March 2022, Ahmed and Justice Kazi Zinat Hoque questioned why the action should not be taken against the officer in charge of Banani Police Station for not registering the name of a suspect in a hit and run case following a petition by ZI Khan Panna. The suspect was the son of a High Court Division Judge.

Ahmed and Justice Mohammed Akhtaruzzaman squashed an order of the administration at the University of Dhaka demoting Professor Samia Rahman for plagiarism on 4 August 2022. On 18 October, Ahmed and Justice Md Akhtaruzzaman asked the government of Bangladesh to explain why the reconstitution of the board of trustees of Manarat International University, a private university, should not be declared illegal after Prof AKM Fazlul Haque, previous board of trustee member at Manarat International University, filed an appeal against the government move. The government made the mayor of North Dhaka and Awami League politician Atiqul Islam the new chairman of the board of trustees of Manarat International University. Ahmed and Justice Md Akhtaruzzaman declared illegal the decision of Jahangirnagar University to suspend two students for assaulting another student in November.
