= Md. Rezaul Hasan =

Bangladeshi judge

Honourable Justice Md. Rezaul Hasan

High Court Division Judge
- In office 2011–present

Personal details
- Born: December 17, 1962 (age 63)
- Education: University of Dhaka

Md. Rezaul Hasan (born 17 December 1962), also known as M R Hasan, is a judge of the High Court Division of the Bangladesh Supreme Court.

== Education ==
Rezaul Hasan received his bachelor and Masters degrees in law from the University of Dhaka. His father was a lawyer.

== Career ==
Rezaul Hasan became an advocate of the District Court and the High Court Division of the Supreme Court of Bangladesh in 1985 and 1989 respectively. He was enrolled as an advocate of the Appellate Division in 2004. In 2009, he was appointed as an additional judge of the High Court Division. He was elevated to a permanent judge of the High Court Division of the Supreme Court in 2011. In 2003, he was short-term consultant at the World Bank's offices in Dhaka.

Rezaul Hasan contributed an essay to the treatise Investment Across the Borders published by the International Monetary Fund in 2010. His book M. R. Hasan's Index of Bangladesh Laws has been widely accepted by the legal community in Bangladesh and copies of it are preserved in the libraries of the United States Supreme Court, United States Congress, Harvard Law School, Cornell University, Yale University, Columbia University Law School, Princeton University, and the University of Chicago. In 2014, he removed eight members from the board of directors of Pubali Bank, as they did not own the minimum required shares of the bank.

In 2014, after a judgment from Rezaul Hasan, the Bangladesh Securities and Exchange Commission changed its Listing Registrations to require listed companies to hold an annual general meeting in the cities of their registered offices, a move intended to increase transparency in the capital markets. The Ministry of Education circulated information about a judgment by Rezaul Hasan directing that no teachers should be kept under suspension for more than two months. In 2016, Rezaul Hasan and Justice Kashefa Hussain ordered Chittagong Development Authority, Chattogram City Corporation, and the Department of Environment to protect Munshi Pukur, a 100-year-old pond in Chittagong. They then ordered the removal of 2,181 illegal structures from the banks of Karnaphuli River.

On 7 June 2013, Chief Justice Md. Muzammel Hossain warned Rezaul Hasan and cautioned him to be more careful in the future as not to damage the image of the judiciary. Rezaul Hasan was travelling in a two car entourage when his vehicles was stopped at the Bangabandhu Bridge for the bridge toll by Asaduzzaman, supervisor of the toll plaza at the bridge after Rezaul Hasan initially refused to pay. Rezaul Hasan then paid the toll and filed a contempt of court complaint with Bangabandhu Bridge Police Station who then arrested Asaduzzaman. Supervisor Asaduzzaman was sent to Sirajganj District jail and secured bail from Sirajganj District court.

In 2021, he was a keynote speaker at a Dhaka WASA webinar and presented "Development Plans of Bangabandhu and the Present Day Realities" to honour of what would have been Sheikh Mujibur Rahman's 100th birthday.
