= Nasreen Akter =

Bangladeshi judge

Justice of the High Court Division of Bangladesh

Personal details
- Profession: Judge

Nasreen Akter, also spelled Nasrin Akter, is a judge of the High Court Division of Bangladesh Supreme Court.

== Early life ==
Akter was born on 25 October 1980.

== Career ==
Akter became a member of the Dhaka Bar Association in 2008.

Akter, along with 22 others, were appointed judges of the High Court Division on 9 October 2024 following the fall of the Sheikh Hasina led Awami League government.
