= K. M. Zahid Sarwar =

Bangladeshi judge

The Honourable K. M. Zahid Sarwar

Justice of the High Court Division of Bangladesh
- Incumbent
- Assumed office 12 October 1995

Personal details
- Born: 1 January 1971 (age 55)
- Education: University of Rajshahi
- Profession: Judge

K. M. Zahid Sarwar is a justice of the High Court Division of the Bangladesh Supreme Court. He is the former deputy attorney general of Bangladesh.

== Early life ==
Sarwar was born on 1 January 1971. He has a bachelor's and master's in law from the University of Rajshahi.

== Career ==
Sarwar became a lawyer of the district courts and High Court Division on 12 October 1995 and 30 October 1997, respectively.

Sarwar was elected assistant secretary of the Supreme Court Bar Association in 2008.

From 9 February 2009 to 2019, Sarwar served as the deputy attorney general of Bangladesh. He represented the state in the BDR mutiny trial.

Sarwar became a lawyer of the Appellate Division of the Bangladesh Supreme Court on 29 March 2018.

Sarwar was appointed an additional judge of the High Court Division on 21 October 2019.

In September 2021, Sarwar and Justice Mustafa Zaman Islam denied bail for the managing director of Bashundhara Group, Sayem Sobhan Anvir, in a rape and murder case. Sarwar and Justice Mustafa Zaman Islam granted bail to Jhumon Das who had been detained under a Digital Security Act for making a Facebook post on Mamunul Haque, leader of Hefajat-e-Islam, after he had spent more than six months in pretrial detention. On 19 October 2021, Sarwar was appointed a permanent judge of the High Court Division by President Mohammad Abdul Hamid. In September, Sarwar and Justice Mustafa Zaman Islam in a verdict declared that the lower courts violated the rules by placing Pori Moni in police custody multiple times for questioning. They criticized the conduct of the lower court judges in the case. The magistrates of the lower courts apologized to the High Court bench for their actions.

On 21 April 2022, Sarwar and Justice Sheikh Hassan Arif disposed 1501 cases in one day of hearings.

In January 2023, Sarwar and Justice SM Emdadul Haque denied bail to a man accused in the Kalabagan O-level student rape and murder case.
