= Md. Sagir Hossain =

Bangladeshi judge

Justice of the High Court Division of Bangladesh

Personal details
- Profession: Judge

Md. Sagir Hossain is a judge of the High Court Division of Bangladesh Supreme Court.

== Career ==
Hossain was the lawyer of Shamsur Rahman Shimul Biswas, Personal Assistant to the chairperson of the Bangladesh Nationalist Party Khaleda Zia in 2012 when he was charged in the murder of Milon Hossain, an activist of the Bangladesh Nationalist Party.

Hossain, along with 22 others, were appointed Judges of the High Court Division on 9 October 2024 following the fall of the Sheikh Hasina led Awami League government.
