= Shathika Hossain =

Bangladeshi judge

Justice of the High Court Division of Bangladesh

Personal details
- Profession: Judge

Shathika Hossain, also spelled Sathika Hossain, is a judge of the High Court Division of Bangladesh Supreme Court.

== Career ==
In 2007, Hossain was a Deputy Attorney General of Bangladesh.

Hossain, along with 22 others, were appointed Judges of the High Court Division on 9 October 2024 following the fall of the Sheikh Hasina led Awami League government.
