= Sayed Jahed Mansur =

Sayed Jahed Mansur is a judge of the High Court Division of Bangladesh Supreme Court.

== Career ==
As judge of the Metropolitan Special Tribunal-9, Mansur sentenced Harris Chowdhury to three years imprisonment in October 2007. He sentenced former minister of home affairs, Lutfozzaman Babar, to 17 years imprisonment in an arms case.

In 2011, Mansur was the chief judicial magistrate of Pabna District.

Mansur, along with 22 others, were appointed judges of the High Court Division on 9 October 2024 following the fall of the Sheikh Hasina led Awami League government.
