= Sk. Tahsin Ali =

Bangladeshi judge

SK. Tahsin Ali

Justice of the High Court Division of Bangladesh

Personal details
- Profession: Judge

Sk. Tahsin Ali is a judge of the High Court Division of Bangladesh Supreme Court.

== Career ==
Ali was accused in an attempted murder case by SM Zulfiqure Ali Junu, a pro-Bangladesh Nationalist Party lawyer, in 2011. He was represented by Barristers Jamiruddin Sircar and Bodruddoza Badal and secured anticipatory bail from a bench of the High Court Division.

In 2017, Ali was elected to the Bangladesh Supreme Court Bar Association as a pro-Bangladesh Nationalist Party candidate.

Ali, along with 22 others, were appointed Judges of the High Court Division on 9 October 2024 following the fall of the Sheikh Hasina led Awami League government.
