= Aynun Nahar Siddiqua =

Bangladeshi judge

Justice of the High Court Division of Bangladesh

Personal details
- Profession: Judge

Aynun Nahar Siddiqua is a judge of the High Court Division of Bangladesh Supreme Court.

== Career ==
In 2012, Siddiqua filed a petition to stop bikes going through footpath.

In 2019, Siddiqua successfully represented Bangladesh Legal Aid and Services Trust, Bangladesh Mahila Parishad, and Nari Pakkho in a petition to remove “Kumari” (virgin) from Muslim marriage certificates.

Siddiqua, along with 22 others, were appointed Judges of the High Court Division on 9 October 2024 following the fall of the Sheikh Hasina led Awami League government.
