= Md. Bashir Ullah =

Bangladeshi judge

Justice of the High Court Division of Bangladesh
- Incumbent
- Assumed office 31 August 1996

Personal details
- Born: December 31, 1967 (age 58)
- Education: Jahangirnagar University; Dhaka International University
- Profession: Judge

Md. Bashir Ullah is a Justice of the High Court Division of the Bangladesh Supreme Court. He is a former Deputy Attorney General of Bangladesh.

== Early life ==
Bashir Ullah was born on 31 December 1967. He has a Bachelor of Law, a Master of Social Science, and a Master of Philosophy. He completed his PhD at Jahangirnagar University. He has a diploma from Dhaka International University.

== Career ==
Bashir Ullah started his legal practice on 31 August 1996. He became a lawyer in the High Court Division on 12 December 2001.

From 5 April 2008 to 29 April 2017, Bashir Ullah served as a faculty of Jahangirnagar University and Demra Law College. Bashir Ullah became an Assistant Attorney General of Bangladesh on 20 April 2009. He was promoted to Deputy Attorney General on 22 May 2013.

Bashir Ullah became a lawyer of the Appellate Division on 29 March 2018. He represented the government against Shahidul Alam. Bashir Ullah served as the Deputy Attorney General till 30 July 2022 and was appointed an additional judge of the High Court Division on 31 July. In October 2022, Bashir Ullah and Justice Jahangir Hossain confirmed the death penalty of five in the Aftab Ahmed murder case.

In January, Bashir Ullah and Justice Zafar Ahmed asked the government to explain why retired government officials cannot contest elections within three years of their retirement following a petition filed by retired Brigadier General Md Shamim Kamal. In June 2023, Bashir Ullah and Justice Zafar Ahmed denied a petition filed by Mohammad Zahangir Alam challenging his suspension from the post of mayor of Gazipur.

== Bibliography ==
- Bichitra Doritri
