= Foyej Ahmed =

Bangladeshi judge

Justice of the High Court Division of Bangladesh

Personal details
- Born: 1 November 1977 (age 49)
- Spouse: Niger Sultana
- Education: University of Dhaka
- Profession: Judge

Foyej Ahmed is a judge of the High Court Division of Bangladesh Supreme Court.

== Career ==
Ahmed, along with 22 others, were appointed Judges of the High Court Division on 9 October 2024 following the fall of the Sheikh Hasina-led Awami League government. He was an advocate of the Supreme Court with 23 years experience in the legal arena. Being an enrolled Advocate of Appellate Division, he has served individual and corporate clients, including financial institutions, multinational companies, and regulatory bodies. His honours and masters degree were obtained from the University of Dhaka. He was initially made a deputy attorney general in August 2024. He and Justice Mohammad Ullah ordered an investigation into loans by National Bank Limited to Bashundhara Group.
