= Md. Toufiq Inam =

Bangladeshi judge

Justice of the High Court Division of Bangladesh

Personal details
- Profession: Judge

Md. Toufiq Inam, also known as Toufiq Inam Tipu, is a judge of the High Court Division of Bangladesh Supreme Court.

== Career ==
Inam represented 208 veterans of Bangladesh Liberation War whose names were left out of the government list of freedom fighters in 2016.

Inam, along with 22 others, were appointed Judges of the High Court Division on 9 October 2024 following the fall of the Sheikh Hasina led Awami League government.
