= Mohammad Ali (judge) =

Bangladeshi judge (born 1969)

- মোহাম্মদ আলি

Justice of the High Court Division of Bangladesh
- Incumbent
- Assumed office 31 May 2018

Personal details
- Born: 15 December 1969 (age 56)
- Education: University of Dhaka
- Profession: Judge

Mohammad Ali (born 15 December 1969) is a judge of the High Court Division of the Bangladesh Supreme Court.

== Early life ==
Ali was born on 15 December 1969. He has a bachelor's and master's in law from the University of Dhaka.

== Career ==
Ali became a lawyer of the District Courts on 16 August 1994.

Ali became a High Court Division lawyer on 7 March 1996. He became a lawyer of the Appellate Division of the Bangladesh Supreme Court on 20 March 2018.

Ali was appointed an additional judge of the High Court Division on 31 May 2018.

In August 2019, Ali and Justice Obaidul Hassan ordered the government to follow the warrant of the precedence in providing protocol.

On 30 May 2020, Ali was made a permanent judge of the High Court Division by President Abdul Hamid.

Ali and Justice KM Kamrul Quader order division status in jail for five politicians of the Bangladesh Nationalist Party, Abdus Salam, Khairul Kabir Khokon, Shahiduddin Chowdhury Annie, AKM Fazlul Haque Milon, and Abul Hossain Khan in December 2022.

Ali and Justice KM Kamrul Kader ruled that prisoners have the right to healthcare and that the government has a responsibility to provide those services to prisoners. Ali and Justice KM Kamrul Kader sought an explanation from the government in January on why Syed Hafizur Rahman, a member of the Crack Platoon who died in the Bangladesh Liberation War, was not designated a freedom fighter. In February 2023, Ali and Justice KM Kamrul Kader expressed dissatisfaction with the governments in ability to improve air quality in Dhaka and ordered the closure of illegal brick kilns. Ali and Justice KM Kamrul Kader described the cost of Hajj as fixed by the government as "inhumane" at a hearing on a petition filed against the hajj package cost. In April, Ali and Justice Md Akram Hossain Chowdhury granted bail to the owner of Rana Plaza in a case over the collapse of the building killing 1136 people.
