= Quazi Reza-Ul Hoque =

Bangladeshi Judge

Justice of the High Court Division of Bangladesh

Personal details
- Born: 28 November 1958 (age 67)
- Education: University of Dhaka
- Profession: Judge

Quazi Reza-Ul Hoque was a judge in the High Court Division of the Bangladesh Supreme Court.

== Early life ==
Reza was born on 28 November 1958. He did his bachelor's and master's in law from the University of Dhaka. He did his second master's of law from the University of Essex. He did an MBA from the American International university and PhD from the Nottingham Trent University.

== Career ==
Reza became a lawyer on the district court on 6 October 1985.

On 6 April 1989, Reza became a lawyer of the High Court Division.

Reza was appointed an additional judge of the High Court Division on 18 April 2010.

On 15 April 2012, Reza was made a permanent judge of the High Court Division.

On 8 January 2015, Reza's residence in Feni Sadar Upazila was burned down after he and Justice Abu Taher Md Saifur Rahman issued a verdict which asked the government of Bangladesh to not publicize statements by Tarique Rahman, vice-chairman of Bangladesh Nationalist Party. Soon after his verdict, chairman of Ekushey Television, Abdus Salam was arrested for airing a speech of Tarique Rahman. Near the end of the year S. Alam Group bought Ekushey Television.

In March 2016, Reza-Ul Hoque quashed a petition to remove Islam as the state religion of Bangladesh which was made in 1988 by the president of Bangladesh, General Hussain Mohammad Ershad, who was facing a popular movement against his dictatorship. Reza-Ul Hoque, Justice Moyeenul Islam Chowdhury, and Justice Md Ashraful Kamal issued a verdict scrapping the Sixteenth Amendment to the Constitution of Bangladesh which allowed the government to impeach judges of the Bangladesh Supreme Court on 12 August 2016.

On 13 December 2017, Reza-Ul Hoque and Justice Mohammad Ullah censured Upazila Nirbahi Officer and executive magistrate Mohammad Nooruzzaman of Lakshmipur Sadar Upazila and additional deputy commissioner Sheikh Morshedul Islam of Lakshmipur District for abuse of power.

In August 2019, Reza, Justice Salma Masud Chowdhury, and Justice AKM Zahirul Hoque were sent on forced leave following allegations of corruption. Chowdhury and Zahirul Haque were suspended for issuing a verdict in favor of MR Trading. Bangladesh Supreme Court asked the three to not perform judicial activities. Since then his judicial activities remained suspended.

He resigned from the post of High Court judge on November 19, 2024.
