= Kazi Waliul Islam =

Bangladeshi judge

Justice of the High Court Division of Bangladesh

Personal details
- Profession: Judge

Kazi Waliul Islam is a judge of the High Court Division of Bangladesh Supreme Court.

== Career ==
In May 2005, President Iajuddin Ahmed appointed Waliul Islam as deputy attorney general.

Waliul Islam, along with 22 others, were appointed Judges of the High Court Division on 9 October 2024 following the fall of the Sheikh Hasina led Awami League government.
