= Mubina Asaf =

Bangladeshi judge

Justice of the High Court Division of Bangladesh

Personal details
- Profession: Judge

Mubina Asaf is a judge of the High Court Division of Bangladesh Supreme Court.

== Early life ==
Asaf completed her bachelors and masters in law at the University of Dhaka.

== Career ==
Asaf joined Rokanuddin Mahmud & Associates after her graduation. She practiced law in the Dhaka District Court, the High Court Division and the Appellate Division.

Asaf was appointed assistant attorney general by the Bangladesh Nationalist Party led government. She resigned in 2009 after Awami League came to power and the newly appointed attorney general demanded resignation of all officers appointed by the past government.

Asaf was the head of legal and external affairs at the British American Tobacco Bangladesh. She was a director of Prerona Foundation.

Asaf, along with 22 others, were appointed Judges of the High Court Division on 9 October 2024 following the fall of the Sheikh Hasina led Awami League government.
