= Fahmida Quader =

Bangladeshi judge

Justice of the High Court Division of Bangladesh

Personal details
- Profession: Judge

Fahmida Quader is a Justice of the High Court Division of the Bangladesh Supreme Court. She is the former Tangail District and Session Judge.

== Early life ==
Quader was born on 8 June 1966. Her father, Abdul Kader Talukder, was the Joint Secretary of the Ministry of Law, Justice and Parliamentary Affairs. She did her SSC at Agrani Balika Bidyalay and HSC at Holy Cross College, Dhaka. She did her bachelor of law and master of law from the University of Dhaka. She is married to retired District Judge Md. Maqbul Ahsan.

== Career ==
Quader joined the judicial branch of the Bangladesh Civil Service and was appointed an assistant Judge on 11 December 1991.

Quader was promoted to District Judge on 9 February 2015. She is the vice-chairman of the Women Judge's Association of Bangladesh.

Quader was appointed an additional judge of the High Court Division on 31 July 2022. She and the 10 other newly appointed judges paid tribute to Sheikh Mujibur Rahman at his mausoleum in Gopalganj. In November, Justice S. M. Kuddus Zaman and Quader granted conditional bail to two trustee board members of North South University, M. A. Kashem and Rehana Rahman, in a three billion BDT money laundering case.

Justice S. M. Kuddus Zaman and Quader stayed a Digital Security Act case against singer Rita Dewan for "derogatory" comments about religion in January 2023.
