= Bangladesh Association of International Recruiting Agencies =

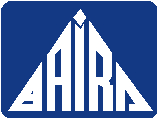
- Formation: 1984, Dhaka, Bangladesh
- Headquarters: 130 New Eskaton Road, Dhaka, Bangladesh
- Members: 1100+
- Key people: Mohammad Abul Bashar, President
- Website: baira.org.bd

The Bangladesh Association of International Recruiting Agencies (BAIRA) is an association of recruiting agencies of migrant workers in Bangladesh. As of 2025, it has approximately 2,400 member agencies and works in collaboration with the government of Bangladesh.

Manpower export from Bangladesh was pioneered in 1976. Since then, International Recruiting or Placement Agents under BAIRA have recruited 5.5 million (approximate, 2009) Bangladeshis for jobs abroad. This resulted in record highest remittance inflow and foreign exchange earned of US$10 billion (net) for the fiscal year 2008–9, making migrant workers the leading contributor to Bangladesh's foreign exchange reserve.

== History and background ==
Bangladesh Association of International Recruiting Agencies (BAIRA) is one of the largest trade bodies in Bangladesh affiliated with the Federation of Bangladesh Chambers of Commerce and Industry (FBCCI), established in 1984. As of 2025, BAIRA has about 2,400 member agencies.

Promises for change, bringing an end to the concept of one person contesting for many terms and another 27 point election manifesto was pledged by Mustafa to make BAIRA dynamic and vibrant as it should have been. While the opposition promised BAIRA Airlines serving international flights for in and outbound workers. The election recorded highest number of member attendance and votes cast. Result of the election left all stunned; as it was the biggest landslide victory in Bangladesh compared to any other trade body election held, as 'Sammilita Ganatantrik Front' received the majority 70.33%(approx.) of votes. Ghulam Mustafa and his 'Sammilita Ganatantrik Front' won 26 seats.

== List of BAIRA members ==
- List of BAIRA Members
