= Md. Salim (judge) =

Bangladeshi Judge

- মো. সেলিম

Justice of the High Court Division of Bangladesh
- Incumbent
- Assumed office 31 August 1996

Personal details
- Born: 11 September 1969 (age 57)
- Education: University of Rajshahi
- Profession: Judge

Md. Salim is a justice of the High Court Division of the Bangladesh Supreme Court.

== Early life ==
Salim was born on 11 September 1969. He did his bachelor's and master's at the University of Rajshahi.

== Career ==
Salim became a lawyer in the district courts on 31 August 1996 and the High Court Division on 1 February 1997.

Salim became a lawyer in the Appellate Division of the Bangladesh Supreme Court on 24 August 2010. He was appointed an additional judge of the High Court Division on 12 February 2015.

On 12 February 2017, Salim was made a permanent judge of the High Court Division. In October 2017, Salim and Justice Syed Refaat Ahmed ordered the government to complete the construction of the Central Effluent Treatment Plant at the Savar tannery estate within four weeks. Salim and Justice Syed Refaat Ahmed issued a two-month injunction on member of parliament Mahbubur Rahman Talukder from holding the post of chairman of 11 educational institutions in Patuakhali District.

In April 2018, Salim and Justice Syed Refaat Ahmed suspended the term extension of the Accord on Fire and Building Safety in Bangladesh after Smart Jeans filed an appeal after its contract was suspended by the Accord.

In November 2019, Salim and Justice Syed Refaat Ahmed declared the import of MT Producer for the shipbreaking industry illegal due to the ship being contaminated with radioactive material.

On 9 December 2021, Salim upheld the verdict in a tax evasion case over an imported Hummer against Harunur Rashid after hearing his appeal. Salim commuted his sentence to time served.

Salim and Justice Mustafa Zaman Islam stopped the narcotics case against Pori Moni for three months in March 2022. Salim and Justice Mustafa Zaman Islam criticized the Police Bureau of Investigation over its handling of the murder of Nurul Islam, a labour union activist, in Rajshahi in an attempt to protect accused, another leader of the Puthia Motor Sramik Union. Salim and Justice Md Atabullah denied bail to the mayor of Tangail, Shahidur Rahman Khan Mukti, in a case over the murder of an Awami League leader. Salim and Justice Mustafa Zaman Islam denied bail to former chairman of Laxmipur Union, Selim Khan, for having 345.3 million BDT of illegal wealth. Salim and Justice Md Riaz Uddin Khan granted bail to Jhumon Das who had been accused in hurting religious sentiments under the Digital Security Act.

In February 2023, Salim and Justice Md Riaz Uddin Khan granted permanent bail to Bangladesh Nationalist Party politicians, Mirza Fakhrul Islam Alamgir, and Mirza Abbas, in a case filed over clashes between Bangladesh Police and activists of Bangladesh Nationalist Party. Salim and Justice Md Riaz Uddin Khan granted anticipatory bail to 25 pro-Bangladesh Nationalist Party lawyers over violence at the Bangladesh Supreme Court Bar Association.
