= Kazi Md. Ejarul Haque Akondo =

Bangladeshi judge

The Honourable Kazi Md. Ejarul Haque Akondo
- কাজী ইজারুল হক আকন্দো

Justice of the High Court Division of Bangladesh
- Incumbent
- Assumed office 14 June 2012

Personal details
- Born: 24 May 1971 (age 55)
- Education: University of Dhaka
- Profession: Judge

Kazi Md. Ejarul Haque Akondo (born 24 May 1971) is a Bangladeshi judge of the High Court Division, Supreme Court of Bangladesh. He was appointed in 2012.

== Early life ==
Akondo was born on 24 May 1971. He completed his bachelor's and master's from the University of Dhaka.

== Career ==
Akondo started working as a district court lawyer on 1 April 1995.

On 30 October 1997, Akondo became a lawyer of the High Court Division of Bangladesh Supreme Court.

Akondo was appointed a judge of the High Court Division of Bangladesh Supreme Court on 14 June 2012. In June 2014, he was made a permanent judge of the High Court Division.

In May 2014, Akondo and Justice Farah Mahbub issued a split verdict on 25 May 2014 on a petition filed by former prime minister Khaleda Zia. The petition called the appointment of Special Judge Basudeb Roy to the Zia Charitable Trust corruption case illegal. Akondo ordered for the petition to be scrapped while Mahbub ordered a freezing of the trust corruption trial. The chief justice appointed Justice Quazi Reza-Ul Hoque to solve the issue.

On 14 December 2015, Akondo and Justice Farah Mahbub asked the government to explain the legal basis behind the construction of a market near Balda Garden in Wari, Old Dhaka. The order was issued after The Daily Star reported a road beside the garden was leased by Dhaka South City Corporation to Awami League members to build the market.

In February 2021, Akondo and Justice AKM Asaduzzaman granted bail to a journalist in a case filed under the Digital Security Act by Deputy Commissioner of Kishoreganj District Md Sarwar Murshed Chowdhury. Akondo and Justice Muhammad Abdul Hafiz extended the bail of former prime minister Khaleda Zia by one year on 28 September 2021.
