= Md. Iqbal Kabir =

Bangladeshi judge

- মো. ইকবাল কবির

Justice of the High Court Division of Bangladesh
- Incumbent
- Assumed office 10 May 1992

Personal details
- Born: November 10, 1967 (age 58)
- Profession: Judge

Md. Iqbal Kabir, also known as Md Iqbal Kabir Lytton, is a judge on the High Court Division of the Bangladesh Supreme Court.

== Early life ==
Kabir was born on 10 November 1967. He completed his master's degree in law from the University of Dhaka.

== Career ==
Kabir became a lawyer of the district courts on 10 May 1992.

On 24 January 1995, Kabir became a lawyer of the High Court Division of the Bangladesh Supreme Court.

Kabir was appointed an additional judge of the High Court Division of the Bangladesh Supreme Court on 12 February 2015. On 9 June Kabir and Justice Naima Haider ordered the Bangladesh Police to take secretary general of the Bangladesh Nationalist Party Mirza Fakhrul Islam Alamgir, who was in police custody, to Bangabandhu Sheikh Mujib Medical University following a petition filed by Fakhrul's wife.

On 8 February 2017, Kabir was made a permanent judge of the High Court Division of the Bangladesh Supreme Court.

In December 2018, Kabir and Justice Syed Refaat Ahmed gave a split verdict on a petition challenging the Election Commission cancelling the nomination of former prime minister Khaleda Zia for the 11th parliamentary elections scheduled for 31 December 2018. Justice Syed Refaat Ahmed asked the Election Commission to accept the candidate of Khaleda Zia while Kabir supported blocking Khaleda Zia from participating in the election.

Kabir is the vice-principal of the Dhanmondi Law College.

Kabir and Justice Mustafa Zaman Islam provided bail to eight accused of attacking a 2002 Satkhira motorcade of Prime Minister Sheikh Hasina in May 2021. In December 2021, Kabir and Justice Md Ashfaqul Islam in a verdict recognized the copyright of Sheikh Abdul Hakim, the ghost writer of Masud Rana, over the books he wrote and not the claims of Qazi Anwar Hossain, the creator of Masud Rana.
