= Md. Nazrul Islam Talukder =

Bangladeshi judge

Personal details
- Born: 1 December 1964 (age 61)
- Occupation: Judge, lawyer

Md. Nazrul Islam Talukder is a judge of the High Court Division of Bangladesh Supreme Court. He is a member of Bangladesh Judicial Service Commission.

== Early life ==
Talukder was born on 1 December 1964. He has a bachelors and masters in law.

== Career ==
Talukder became a lawyer of the District Courts on 16 October 1991.

On 21 August 1993, Talukder became a lawyer of the High Court Division of Bangladesh Supreme Court.

Talukder became a lawyer on the Appellate Division of Bangladesh Supreme Court on 12 May 2008.

On 4 November 2010, Talukder was appointed an additional judge of the High Court Division of Bangladesh Supreme Court.

On 15 October 2012, Talukder was confirmed as a permanent judge of the High Court Division of Bangladesh Supreme Court.

In November 2017, Talukder, Justice Md Shawkat Hossain, and Justice Md Abu Zafor Siddique gave the verdict in the Bangladesh Rifles mutiny case. In the verdict he was critical of Operation Dal-Bhat and asked the government not to repeat such actions that might have a negative effect on moral and professionalism of the soldiers.

Talukder was appointed to the Bangladesh Judicial Service Commission on 4 October 2020. On 5 October 2020, Talukder and Justice Ahmed Sohel granted anticipatory bail to A. K. M. A. Awal Saydur Rahman, former Awami League member of parliament for Pirojpur-1, and his wife on corruption charges.

Talukder and Justice Mohi Uddin Shamim issued a ruling asking the government to explain its failure to detain associates of PK Halder. On 7 November 2021, Talukder and Justice S. M. Mozibur Rahman gave a split verdict on the bail petition of retired Lieutenant Colonel Didarul Alam, director of Destiny Group, on money laundering charges.

On 23 November 2021, Talukder and Justice AKM Zahirul Huq ordered Agrani Bank Limited official, Manik Kumar Pramanik, to surrender to the court on charges of leaking question papers.
