= Md. Shahinur Islam =

Bangladeshi judge

- মো. শাহিনুর ইসলাম

Justice of the High Court Division of Bangladesh
- In office 5 August 2013 – 10 August 2024

Personal details
- Born: 7 April 1958 (age 68)

Md. Shahinur Islam (born 7 April 1958) is a retired judge of the Appellate Division of Bangladesh Supreme Court and International Crimes Tribunal.

== Early life ==
Islam was born on 7 April 1958. He completed his bachelors in law from the University of Rajshahi.

== Career ==
Islam enrolled at the Mymensingh District Bar in 1983 and practised criminal law in the Sessions Court as well as High Court.

Islam was appointed the District Munsiff Court on 20 April 1983.

On 13 January 2001, Islam was promoted to District and Sessions Judge and worked in Habiganj District and Narail District. He was then stationed in the Government Servant Administrative Tribunal.

In April 2010, Islam was appointed to the International Crimes Tribunal as its registrar.

On 22 March 2012, Islam was appointed member of the second International Crimes Tribunal.

Islam was appointed Additional Judge of the High Court Division on 5 August 2013.

Islam was an expert in the Law of Criminal Procedure and Appeals. He also handled quasi-civil matters under the Negotiable Instruments Act, Customs Act, Excise Act and in prosecution cases in Company Law. Elevated to the Bench in 2014. He was appointed in 2015.

On 11 October 2017, Islam was appointed head judge/chairman of the International Crimes Tribunal-1. The post fell vacant after the death of the previous chairman Justice Anwarul Haque.

On 24 November 2021, Islam sentenced Abdul Momen Talukder, former Bangladesh Nationalist Party member of parliament, to death on war crimes charges.
