= Md. Hamidur Rahman =

Bangladeshi judge

Justice of the High Court Division of Bangladesh

Personal details
- Profession: Judge

Md. Hamidur Rahman is a judge of the High Court Division of Bangladesh Supreme Court.

== Career ==
Hamidur Rahman, along with 22 others, were appointed Judges of the High Court Division on 9 October 2024 following the fall of the Sheikh Hasina led Awami League government.
