= Md. Bazlur Rahman =

Bangladeshi judge

Justice of the High Court Division of Bangladesh

Personal details
- Born: June 5, 1964 (age 62)
- Education: University of Dhaka
- Profession: Judge

Md. Bazlur Rahman is a Justice of the High Court Division of the Bangladesh Supreme Court.

== Early life ==
Bazlur Rahman was born on 5 June 1964 in Nalchiti Upazila, Jhalakathi District, East Pakistan, Pakistan. In 1979, he sat for his SSC under the Jessore Education Board and HSC in 1981. He obtained his bachelor's and master of law from the University of Dhaka in 1985 and 1986. He completed an NDC course from the National Defence College.

== Career ==
In 1987, Bazlur Rahman joined the Dhaka District Bar Association.

Bazlur Rahman joined the judicial branch of the Bangladesh Civil Service in 1989 as an Assistant Judge.

In 2014, Bazlur Rahman was promoted to District and Sessions Judge. He is affiliated with the Police Traffic Training School, Dhaka, the Bangladesh Public Administration Training Center, and the Judicial Administration Training Institute.

Bazlur Rahman was appointed an additional judge of the High Court Division on 31 July 2022 by President Mohammad Abdul Hamid. He and the ten newly appointed judges visited the shrine of former President Sheikh Mujibur Rahman after their appointment.
