= Sheikh Hassan Arif =

Bangladeshi judge

Justice of the High Court Division of Bangladesh

Personal details
- Profession: Judge

Sheikh Hassan Arif is a judge of the High Court Division of Bangladesh Supreme Court.

== Early life ==
Arif was born on 20 April 1968 to Late Faizur Rahaman and Late Hosne Ara Begum ( Died 8 July 2023) ( Died in Evercare Hospital Chattogram). He completed a bachelor of law and a M.S.S. degree from the University of Chittagong. He completed a second law degree from the University of Wolverhampton.

== Career ==
Arif became a lawyer of the District Courts on 12 October 1995.

On 18 January 1998, Arif became a lawyer of the High Court Division of Bangladesh Supreme Court.

Arif was appointed an additional judge of the High Court Division of Bangladesh Supreme Court on 18 April 2010.

In January 2011, Arif and Justice Md. Imman Ali issued a verdict which banned corporal punishment in all educational institutions in Bangladesh.

On 15 April 2012, Arif was made a permanent judge of the High Court Division. In November 2012, Arif felt embarrassed to hear the bail plea of Shukho Ranjan Bali, defense witness for convicted war criminal Delawar Hossain Sayedee, after he initially indicated he would prefer a later date for the hearing. The senior member of the High Court bench, Justice Syed Refaat Ahmed, wanted to hear the bail plea at which point Arif announced he was embarrassed to hear it which sent the plea to the bench of the chief justice.

On 25 September 2014, Arif and Justice Muhammad Ullah rejected a petition filed to seek the appointment of A B M Altaf Hossain to a permanent judge of the High Court from his post of Additional judge.

In October 2019, Arif and Justice Razik-Al-Jalil refused to hear a petition seeking compensation for the family member of Abrar Fahad. On 20 October 2019, Arif and Justice Razik-Al-Jalil declared the government's recent announcement for minimum age of freedom fighters (veterans of Bangladesh Liberation war) illegal and unconstitutional.

On 10 February 2020, Arif and Justice Md Mahmud Hassan banned the playing of card and dice games, and housie in social clubs as it viewed the activities as illegal gambling. Arif and Justice Razik-Al-Jalil ordered the jail authorities to provide divisional facilities to Mainul Hosein.

Arif and Justice Ahmed Sohel in November 2021 issued a verdict saying a lower court would discover if the father of Monnujan Sufian, State Minister of Labour and Employment, was a member of the East Pakistan Central Peace Committee during Bangladesh Liberation war on a petition filed by historian Muntassir Mamoon. Mamoon had been sued by Sufian in 2019 after he claimed her father was a collaborator and member of the peace committee during the war and Mamoon filed a petition challenging the lawsuit by Sufian.
