= Abu Taher Md. Saifur Rahman =

Bangladeshi Judge

Justice of the High Court Division of Bangladesh
- Incumbent
- Assumed office 19 May 1991

Personal details
- Born: 31 December 1966 (age 59)
- Education: University of Dhaka
- Profession: Justice

Abu Taher Md. Saifur Rahman is a Judge of the High Court Division of Bangladesh Supreme Court.

== Early life ==
Saifur Rahman was born on 31 December 1966. He has a bachelor's and master's in law from the University of Dhaka. He did another bachelor's in law from the University of Wolverhampton.

== Career ==
On 19 May 1991, Saifur Rahman started working as a lawyer in the district courts and the High Court Division on 12 December 1992.

Saifur Rahman was appointed an additional judge of the High Court Division on 20 October 2011.

Saifur Rahman was made a permanent judge of the High Court Division on 7 October 2013.
