= Fatema Najib =

Bangladeshi judge

The Honourable Fatema Najib
- ফাতেমা নজীব

Justice of the High Court Division of Bangladesh
- Incumbent
- Assumed office 31 May 2018

Personal details
- Born: 11 July 1959 (age 67)
- Parent(s): Md. Abdul Basir Chowdhury (father); Hosne Ara Begum (mother)
- Education: University of Dhaka
- Profession: Judge

Fatema Najib (born 11 July 1959) is a Bangladeshi justice of the High Court Division.

== Early life ==
Najib was born on 11 May 1959. She has a law degree from the University of Dhaka.

== Career ==
Najib started her career in Judicial Service as Munsif on 12 November 1984.

In September 2011, Najib was promoted a District and Sessions Judge. Najib was appointed as an additional judge of the High Court Division on 31 May 2018.
