= K. M. Kamrul Kader =

Bangladeshi judge

The Honourable K. M. Kamrul Kader
- কে. এম. কামরুল কাদের

Justice of the High Court Division of Bangladesh
- Incumbent
- Assumed office 18 April 2011

Personal details
- Born: 9 June 1964 (age 61)
- Profession: Judge

K. M. Kamrul Kader (born 9 June 1964) is a Bangladeshi justice of the High Court Division Supreme Court of Bangladesh. He was appointed in 2011.

== Early life ==
Kamrul Kader was born on 9 June 1964. He completed his bachelors and masters in law from the University of Rajshahi. He completed a second bachelors in law from the University of Wolverhampton.

== Career ==
On 26 October 1987, Kamrul Kader started his legal practice in the district courts. Kamrul Kader became a lawyer of the High Court Division on 9 October 1990. On 20 October 2011, Kamrul Kader was appointed as an additional judge on the High Court Division. He became a regular judge of the High Court Division on 7 October 2013.

On 29 August 2019, Kamrul Kader and Justice FRM Nazmul Ahasan issued a ruling that mandated portraits of Sheikh Mujibur Rahman be in all courtrooms of Bangladesh.

On 15 February 2020, Kamrul Kader and Justice FRM Nazmul Ahasan issued a ruling that asked the government to make 7 March the "historic national day" because of the 7 March Speech of Bangabandhu.

On 10 March 2020, Kamrul Kader and Justice FRM Nazmul Ahasan issued a ruling that declared Joy Bangla to be the national slogan of Bangladesh.
