= Bhishmadev Chakrabortty =

Bangladeshi judge

The Honourable Bhishmadev Chakrabortty
- ভীষ্মদেব চক্রবর্তী

Justice of the High Court Division of Bangladesh
- Incumbent
- Assumed office 12 February 2015

Personal details
- Born: 2 July 1967 (age 59)
- Parent(s): Keshab Chakrabortty (father); Suniti Chakrabortty (mother)
- Education: University of Dhaka
- Profession: Judge

Bhishmadev Chakrabortty (born 2 July 1967) is a Bangladeshi judge of the High Court Division of the Bangladesh Supreme Court. He was appointed in 2015.

== Early life ==
Chakrabortty completed his bachelors and masters in law from the University of Dhaka. He enrolled a lawyer of the district court on 11 October 1993.

== Career ==
Chakrabortty became a lawyer of the High Court Division of the Bangladesh Supreme Court on 28 January 1995.

On 24 August 2010, Chakrabortty became a lawyer of the Appellate Division of the Bangladesh Supreme Court.

Chakrabortty on 12 February 2015 was appointed a judge on the High Court Division of the Bangladesh Supreme Court.

Chakrabortty and Justice Md Ruhul Quddus on 15 December 2015, conformed the 15 year sentence handed down to Osman Gani, former chief conservator of forest, on corruption charges.

In October 2016, Chakrabortty and Justice Md Ruhul Quddus issued a verdict that said a rape accused cannot be found only on the basis of lack of medical evidence.

On 9 May 2017, Chakrabortty and Justice Md Ruhul Quddus acquitted former President Hussain Mohammad Ershad in a 25 year old corruption case relating to his presidency.

Chakrabortty and Justice Md Ruhul Quddus gave the verdict on the Murder of Biswajit Das, on 6 August 2017. They upheld the verdict of the lower court which had sentenced 8 accused to death.
