= Naima Haider =

Bangladeshi justice

- নাইমা হায়দার

Justice of the High Court Division of Bangladesh
- In office 30 June 2009 – 9 February 2026

Personal details
- Born: 19 March 1962 (age 64)
- Parents: Badrul Haider Chowdhury (father); Begum Anwara Chowdhury (mother)
- Education: University of Dhaka; Columbia University

Naima Haider (born 19 March 1962) is a former Bangladeshi justice of the High Court Division.

== Early life and education ==
Haider was born on 19 March 1962. Her father, Badrul Haider Chowdhury, was the 5th Chief Justice of Bangladesh. Her mother is Begum Anwara Chowdhury. She passed her LLB and LLM from University of Dhaka. She has completed her second masters in law from Columbia University.

== Career ==
Haider was elevated as additional judge of the High Court Division on 30 June 2009 and appointed judge on 6 June 2011.
