= Supreme Court of Bangladesh =

Highest court of Bangladesh

- বাংলাদেশ সুপ্রীম কোর্ট
- Supreme Court of Bangladesh Logo

- Flag of the Supreme Court of Bangladesh
- Interactive map of Supreme Court of Bangladesh
- 23.7308°N 90.4025°E
- Location: Shahbag, Dhaka 1000, Bangladesh
- Coordinates: 23.7308°N 90.4025°E
- Authorised by: Constitution of Bangladesh
- Appeals to: Appellate Division, Supreme Court of Bangladesh
- Judge term length: Mandatory retirement at 67 years of age.
- Number of positions: 6 in Appellate Division; 95 in High Court Division
- Annual budget: ৳282 crore (US$23 million) (2024-2025)
- Website: supremecourt.gov.bd

Chief Justice of Bangladesh
- Currently: Zubayer Rahman Chowdhury
- Since: 28 December 2025

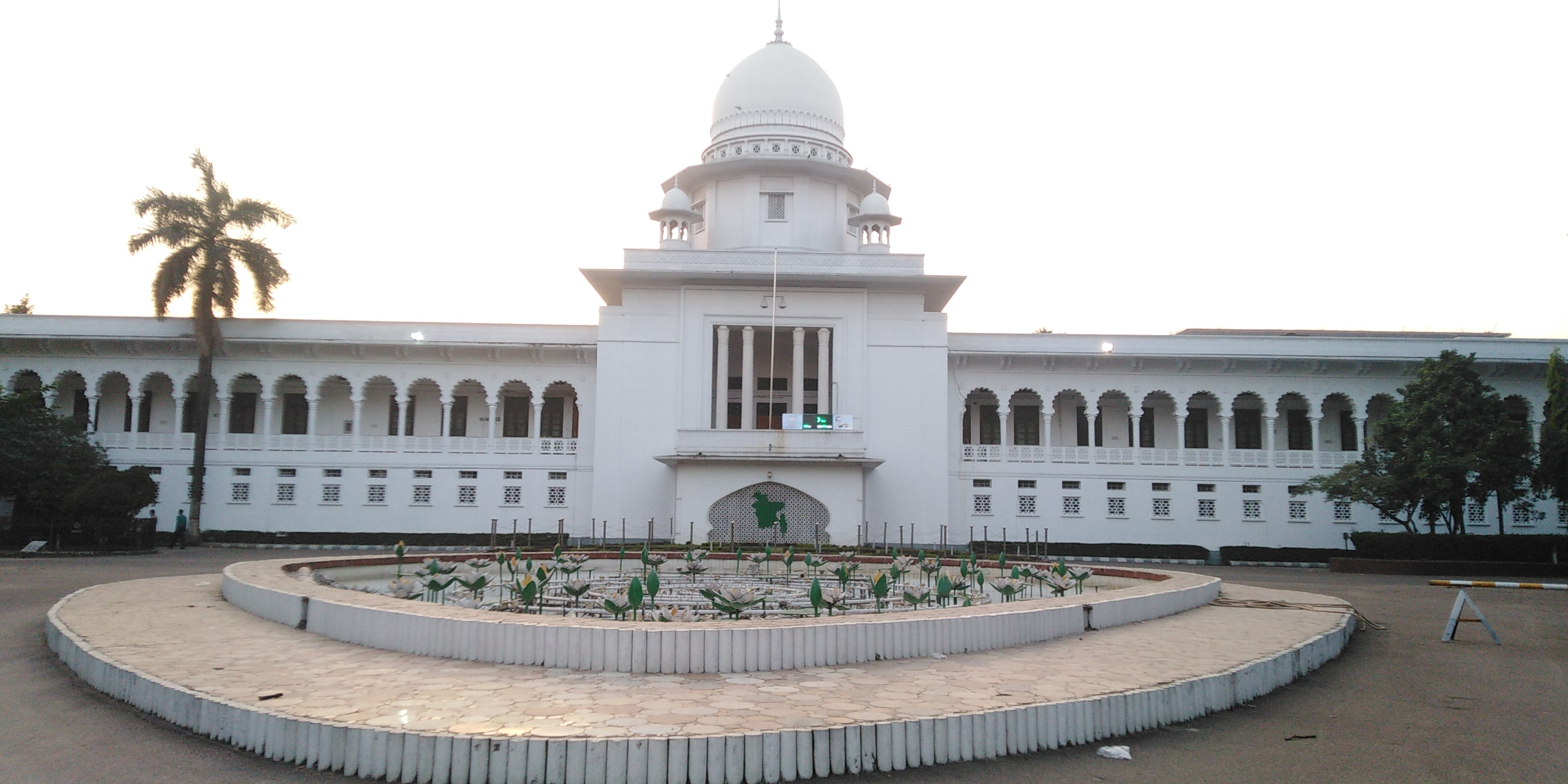
Supreme Court of Bangladesh in Dhaka

Supreme Court of Bangladesh (SCB) (Note: Bengali: বাংলাদেশ সুপ্রীম কোর্ট, romanized: Baṅladeś Suprim Korṭ, pronounced [ˈbaŋlaˌdeʃ ˈsupɾim ˈkoɾt]) is the highest court of law in the People's Republic of Bangladesh. It is composed of the High Court Division and the Appellate Division, and was established by Part VI, Chapter I (Article 94) of the Constitution of Bangladesh, adopted in 1972. This is also the office of the chief justice, Appellate Division judges, and High Court Division judges of Bangladesh. As of February 2026, the Appellate Division consists of 6 judges, while the High Court Division has 103 judges (77 are permanent and 26 are additional).

== Structure ==
The Supreme Court of Bangladesh is divided into two parts: the Appellate Division and the High Court Division. The High Court Division hears appeals against decisions of the lower courts and tribunals; it also has original jurisdiction in certain limited cases, such as writ jurisdiction under Article 102 of the Constitution of Bangladesh, and company and admiralty matters. The Appellate Division has jurisdiction to hear appeals against decisions of the High Court Division under Article 103 of the Constitution of Bangladesh. The Supreme Court is independent of the executive branch, and is theoretically able to rule against the government in politically controversial cases.

The chief justice of Bangladesh is appointed by the president, while other judges of the Supreme Court are appointed by the president following mandatory consultation with the chief justice. The entry point to the seat of judges in the High Court Division is the post of additional judge who are appointed from among the practising advocates of the Supreme Court Bar Association and from the judicial service under the provision of Article 98 of the constitution for a period of two years. The current ratio of such appointment is 80%–20% (80% from the advocates of the Supreme Court and 20% from the judges of district courts). Upon successful completion of this period and upon recommendation by the chief justice an Additional Judge is appointed permanently by the president of Bangladesh under the provision of Article 95 of the Constitution. The judges of the Appellate Division are also appointed by the president of Bangladesh under the same provision. All such appointments come into effect on and from the date of taking oath by the appointee under the provision of Article 148 of the constitution.

A judge of the Bangladesh Supreme Court serves until the age of 67, as extended by Article 95 of the Constitution through the (Thirteenth) Amendment Act, 2004 (Act 14 of 2004). A retiring judge faces disability in pleading or acting before any court or authority or holding any office of profit in the service of the republic, not being a judicial or quasi-judicial office or the office of the chief adviser or adviser.

A Supreme Court judge is not removable from office except in accordance with the provision of Article 96 of the Constitution which provides for the Supreme Judicial Council empowering it to remove a judge of the Supreme Court from office upon allowing the delinquent judge an opportunity of being heard. The supreme judicial council is constituted with the chief justice of Bangladesh and next two senior judges of the Appellate Division, provided if at any time the Council inquiring into the capacity or conduct of a judge who is a member of the supreme judicial council, or a member of the council is absent or is unable to act due to illness or other cause, the judge who is the next in seniority to those who are members of the council shall act as such member.

Supreme court judges are independent in their judicial function as empowered through article 94(4) of the Constitution.

== Judgments ==
As per Article 111 of the Constitution of Bangladesh, 1972, the Supreme Court judgments have binding effects and the article provides that the law declared by the Appellate Division shall be binding on the High Court Division and the law declared by either division of the Supreme Court shall be binding on all courts subordinate to it.

These judgements are usually summarised in the Bangladesh Supreme Court Digest. There are also many law reports which publish the judgments and orders of the Supreme Court. All these law reports are in printed volumes. The Chancery Law Chronicles offers the online service of judgments of Supreme Court of Bangladesh.

=== Language ===
Although Bengali is the only state language of Bangladesh in accordance with the article 3 of the Constitution of Bangladesh, the verdicts given by the judges at the Supreme Court of Bangladesh are frequently in English following the colonial tradition of the British rule, violating the Bengali Language Implementation Act, 1987. Sheikh Hasina, the immediate past prime minister of Bangladesh, suggested that the judges should deliver their verdicts in Bengali so that every Bangladeshi can read them, and, later on if need be, the verdicts could be translated into English. Muhammad Habibur Rahman, a former chief justice of Bangladesh, stated that if justice is a virtue and a service to the people, then verdicts should be given in Bengali. He also stated that if the people of the country want that all works in the Supreme Court must be operated in Bengali, then the representatives of the people in the Jatiya Sangsad (Parliament of Bangladesh) must enact and implement law to ensure the use of Bengali in the Supreme Court.

== Justices ==
=== Sitting justices of the Appellate Division ===
Name	Date appointed in Appellate Division	Date appointed in High Court Division as additional judge	Mandatory retirement	Appointing President at High Court Division	Prime minister at time of appointment in High Court Division	Judicial position before appointment as a justice	Law school
Chief Justice Zubayer Rahman Chowdhury	13 August 2024	27 August 2003	17 May 2028	Iajuddin Ahmed	Khaleda Zia (BNP)	Advocate at Supreme Court	University of Dhaka
Justice S. M. Emdadul Hoque	13 August 2024	27 August 2003	6 November 2030	Iajuddin Ahmed	Khaleda Zia (BNP)	Advocate at Supreme Court	University of Rajshahi
Justice Md. Rezaul Haque	13 August 2024	23 August 2004	23 April 2027	Iajuddin Ahmed	Khaleda Zia (BNP)	Advocate at Supreme Court	University of Dhaka
Madame Justice Farah Mahbub	25 March 2025	23 August 2004	26 May 2033	Iajuddin Ahmed	Khaleda Zia (BNP)	Advocate at Supreme Court	University of Dhaka
Justice Md. Habibul Gani	27 August 2026	18 April 2010	31 May 2029	Zillur Rahman	Sheikh Hasina (AL)	Advocate at Supreme Court	University of Chittagong

== Sitting permanent judges of the High Court Division ==
1. Justice Md. Ashraful Kamal
2. Justice K. M. Kamrul Kader
3. Justice Md. Mozibur Rahman Miah
4. Justice Mostofa Zaman Islam
5. Justice Mohammad Ullah
6. Justice Abu Taher Mohammad Saifur Rahman
7. Justice Md. Badruzzaman
8. Justice Zafar Ahmed
9. Justice Kazi Md. Ejarul Haque Akondo
10. Justice Khizir Ahmed Choudhury
11. Justice Razik-Al-Jalil
12. Justice Bhishmadev Chakrabortty
13. Justice Md. Iqbal Kabir
14. Justice Md. Salim
15. Justice Md. Shohrowardi
16. Madam Justice Fatema Najib
17. Justice Md. Kamrul Hossain Molla
18. Justice S. M. Kuddus Zaman
19. Justice Md Atoar Rahman
20. Justice Shashanka Shekhar Sarkar
21. Justice Mohammad Ali
22. Justice Mohi Uddin Shamim
23. Justice Md. Riaz Uddin Khan
24. Justice Md Khairul Alam
25. Justice S. M. Moniruzzaman
26. Justice Ahmed Sohel
27. Justice Sardar Mohammad Rashed Jahangir
28. Justice K. M. Hafizul Alam
29. Justice Md Zakir Hossain
30. Justice Md Mahmud Hasan Talukder
31. Justice Kazi Ebadoth Hossain
32. Justice K. M. Zahid Sarwar
33. Justice A. K. M. Zahirul Huq
34. Madam Justice Kazi Zinat Hoque
35. Justice Mohammad Showkat Ali Chowdhury
36. Justice Biswajit Debnath
37. Justice Md. Atabullah
38. Justice Md. Ali Reza
39. Justice Md. Bazlur Rahman
40. Justice K. M. Emrul Kayesh
41. Justice Fahmida Quader
42. Justice Md. Bashir Ullah
43. Justice A. K. M. Rabiul Hassan
44. Justice Md. Golam Mortuza Mozumder
45. Justice Md. Mansur Alam
46. Justice Sayed Jahed Mansur
47. Justice K. M. Rasheduzzaman Raja
48. Justice Md. Jabid Hossain
49. Madam Justice Mubina Asaf
50. Justice Kazi Waliul Islam
51. Madam Justice Aynun Nahar Siddiqua
52. Justice Md. Abdul Mannan
53. Madam Justice Tamanna Rahman
54. Justice Md. Shofiul Alam Mahmood
55. Justice Md. Hamidur Rahman
56. Madam Justice Nasreen Akter
57. Madam Justice Shathika Hossain
58. Justice Syed Mohammed Tazrul Hossain
59. Justice Md. Toufiq Inam
60. Justice Yousuf Abdullah Suman
61. Justice Sk. Tahsin Ali
62. Justice Foyej Ahmed
63. Justice Md. Sagir Hossain
64. Justice Sikder Mahmudur Razi
65. Justice Syed Enayet Hossain
66. Justice Debasish Roy Chowdhury
67. Justice Anwarul Islam (Shahin)
68. Justice Saiful Islam
69. Justice Nurul Islam
70. Justice Sheikh Abu Taher
71. Justice Aziz Ahmed Bhuiyan
72. Justice Rajiuddin Ahmed
73. Justice Faisal Hasan Arif
74. Justice SM Saiful Islam
75. Justice Md Ashif Hasan
76. Justice Md Ziaul Haque
77. Justice Dihider Masum Kabir
78. Madam Justice Jasmine Ara Begum
79. Justice Murad-e-Mawla Sohel
80. Justice Md Rafizul Islam
81. Justice Md Manjur Alam
82. Justice Md Lutfar Rahman
83. Justice Rezaul Karim
84. Madam Justice Fatema Anwar
85. Justice Mahmud Hasan
86. Justice Syed Hasan Zubair
87. Justice AFM Saiful Karim
88. Madam Justice Urmi Rahman
89. Justice SM Iftekhar Uddin Mahmud
90. Justice Md Zakir Hossain
91. Justice Abdur Rahman

== Controversy ==
In 2004, Justice Syed Shahidur Rahman was terminated by President Iajuddin Ahmed on corruption allegation.

Former chief justice Mohammad Fazlul Karim withheld the oath taking of Justice Md. Ruhul Quddus (Babu) as he was involved in the murder of Aaslam, a pro-Jamaat-e-Islami Bangladesh student of Rajshahi University, on 17 November 1988, when he was a leader of Jatiyo Samajtantrik Dal (JSD), and Justice Mohammad Khosruzzaman was overtly involved in contempt of court on 30 November 2006.

Justice Shah Abu Nayeem Mominur Rahman, an appellate division judge, first ever among these judges, resigned on 12 May 2011 due to supersession, as he was presumed to be the chief justice of Bangladesh on 18 May 2011.

Justice Mohammad Nizamul Huq resigned from the post of International Crimes Tribunal (ICT)-1 chairman on 11 December 2012 amid controversy for holding Skype conversations with an expatriate Bangladeshi legal expert based in Belgium.

The president of Bangladesh ordered the formation of a Supreme Judicial Council to investigate alleged misconduct of High Court justice Mizanur Rahman Bhuiyan after he distributed copies of a 17 February The Daily Inqilab report, termed slain (on 15 February 2013) 2013 Shahbag protests activist and blogger Ahmed Rajib Haider was a moortad (heretic), among the justices of the Supreme Court of Bangladesh.

Justice A B M Altaf Hossain was not confirmed as a permanent justice on 12 June 2014 despite recommendation from the chief justice of Bangladesh. So he has served legal notices to the top bureaucrats of Bangladesh government to reinstate him within 72 hours.

Chief Justice Surendra Kumar Sinha resigned on 11 November 2017 from Singapore while on a leave, and transiting from Australia to Canada. Later on former chief justice Surendra Kumar Sinha was sentenced in absentia to 11 years in jail for money laundering and criminal breach of trust.

Former justice AHM Shamsuddin Chowdhury Manik, a judge of the appellate Division of Supreme Court of Bangladesh gained notoriety for number of controversies.In 2003, he accused traffic police officers of contempt of court for not saluting his car while it was passing. The then inspector general of police of the Bangladesh Police, Shahudul Haque, issued a rejoinder that said traffic police are under no obligations to salute anyone and they could do so if it was safe. The High Court Division bench of Justice M A Matin and Justice Syed Refat Ahmed issued a contempt of court charge against Haque which automatically removed him from the post of Inspector General according to the law. The government of Bangladesh secured a presidential pardon that protected Haque's job. He was also criticised for his vitriolic attack on various politicians including Speaker and members of the Parliament.

Furthermore, the Supreme Court of Bangladesh has repeatedly faced criticism for legitimizing authoritarian rule through its treatment of martial law regimes and military tribunals. The Constitution’s Fifth and Seventh Amendments, which the court initially allowed to stand for years, retroactively validated military takeovers, suspended constitutional safeguards, and insulated martial-law authorities from judicial review. Special Martial Law Tribunals operated with severe due-process deficiencies — including closed-door proceedings, restrictions on appeals, and military officers presiding over civilian trials. Later rulings by the court itself acknowledged that these arrangements violated the rule of law, judicial independence, and constitutional supremacy, effectively conceding that the judiciary had long assented to systems enabling political persecution and executive overreach.

During the 2007–2008 military-backed caretaker government in Bangladesh, the judiciary — including the Supreme Court of Bangladesh — was widely criticized for failing to act as an effective check on executive and military authority despite the regime’s nominally civilian character. Courts largely acquiesced to emergency regulations that suspended fundamental rights, expanded detention without trial, curtailed political activity, and enabled sweeping anti-corruption prosecutions widely viewed as politically selective. Human Rights Watch documented widespread arbitrary arrests, emergency-rule detentions, weakened judicial independence, and special tribunals that failed to meet international fair-trial standards, while rights groups alleged that habeas corpus and bail decisions were frequently ignored or politically overridden. The Asian Human Rights Commission further argued that the judiciary became increasingly ineffective under emergency rule, with military intelligence agencies operating beyond meaningful judicial scrutiny and civilian institutions subordinated to military-backed governance.

== See also ==
- Caretaker Government of Bangladesh
- Executive Magistrate of Bangladesh
