= Syed Mahmud Hossain =

22nd Chief Justice of Bangladesh

The Honourable Chief Justice Syed Mahmud Hossain
- সৈয়দ মাহমুদ হোসেন
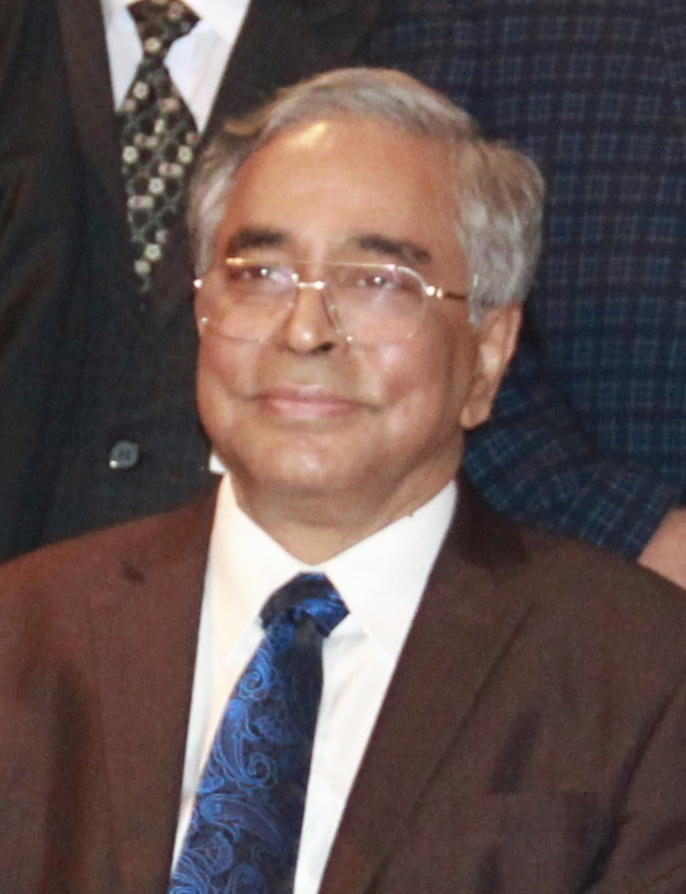
- Hossain in January 2020

22nd Chief Justice of Bangladesh
- In office 2 February 2018 – 30 December 2021
- Appointed by: Abdul Hamid
- President: Abdul Hamid
- Prime Minister: Sheikh Hasina
- Preceded by: Surendra Kumar Sinha; Md. Abdul Wahhab Miah (as acting)
- Succeeded by: Hasan Foez Siddique

Personal details
- Born: 31 December 1954 (age 71)
- Education: University of Chittagong
- Profession: Judge

Syed Mahmud Hossain (born 31 December 1954) was a Bangladeshi lawyer and judge who served as the 22nd Chief Justice of Bangladesh. He retired from the post of Chief Justice on 30 December 2021.

== Early life and education ==
Hossain was born in 1954 to Syed Mustafa Ali (d. 2018) and Begum Kawsar Jahan. His father Late Syed Mustafa Ali was a prominent lawyer in Comilla town. Hossain completed secondary school certificate from Comilla Zilla School, Higher Secondary from Comilla Victoria College and B.Sc from the same college under University of Chittagong in 1972, 1974 and 1976 respectively. In 1980, he obtained LL.B degree from Comilla Law College under the University of Chittagong. He completed six-month post graduate diploma in "Commonwealth Young Lawyers Course" from the School of Oriental African Studies and the Institute of Advanced Legal Studies, both part of University of London.

== Career ==
In 1981, Hossain started practicing law in the District Judge Court. Then he joined as an advocate in the High Court Division in 1983. He was appointed as a deputy attorney general in 1999. He was appointed as Additional Justice of the High Court Division on 22 February 2001 and two years later, on 22 February 2003, the permanent appointment was made. On 23 February 2011, he was appointed as the Appellate Division's Justice. He was the chairman of the search committee formed to form the Election Commission twice. Hossain is a strong supporter of country's Digital Security Act. In a verdict made on 6 March 2021, Hossain cautioned that there would be no consideration of bail for people who would tarnish the image of Bangladesh in any manner. He argued that this is because the first priority is the image of the country.
