= High Court Division, Supreme Court of Bangladesh =

Lower Division of the Supreme Court of Bangladesh

High Court Division of the Supreme Court of Bangladesh
- বাংলাদেশ সুপ্রীম কোর্টের হাইকোর্ট বিভাগ
- Supreme Court of Bangladesh Logo
- Interactive map of High Court Division of the Supreme Court of Bangladesh
- 23.730777°N 90.402458°E
- Location: Ramna, Dhaka 1000, Bangladesh
- Coordinates: 23.730777°N 90.402458°E
- Authorised by: Constitution of Bangladesh
- Appeals to: Appellate Division, Supreme Court of Bangladesh
- Website: www.supremecourt.gov.bd

Chief Justice of Bangladesh
- Currently: Zubayer Rahman Chowdhury
- Since: 28 December 2025

The High Court Division, Supreme Court of Bangladesh (Bengali: হাইকোর্ট বিভাগ), popularly known as High Court, is one of the two divisions of the Supreme Court of Bangladesh, the other division being the Appellate Division. It consists of the Chief Justice of Bangladesh and other judges of the High Court Division.

The High Court Division exercises both original and appellate jurisdiction in civil and criminal matters. Its primary jurisdiction, however, is writ jurisdiction, pursuant to which it is empowered under article 102 of the Constitution of Bangladesh to issue writs of certiorari, mandamus, quo warranto, prohibition and habeas corpus.

== History ==
=== The High Court of Judicature for East Bengal (1947 - 1955) ===
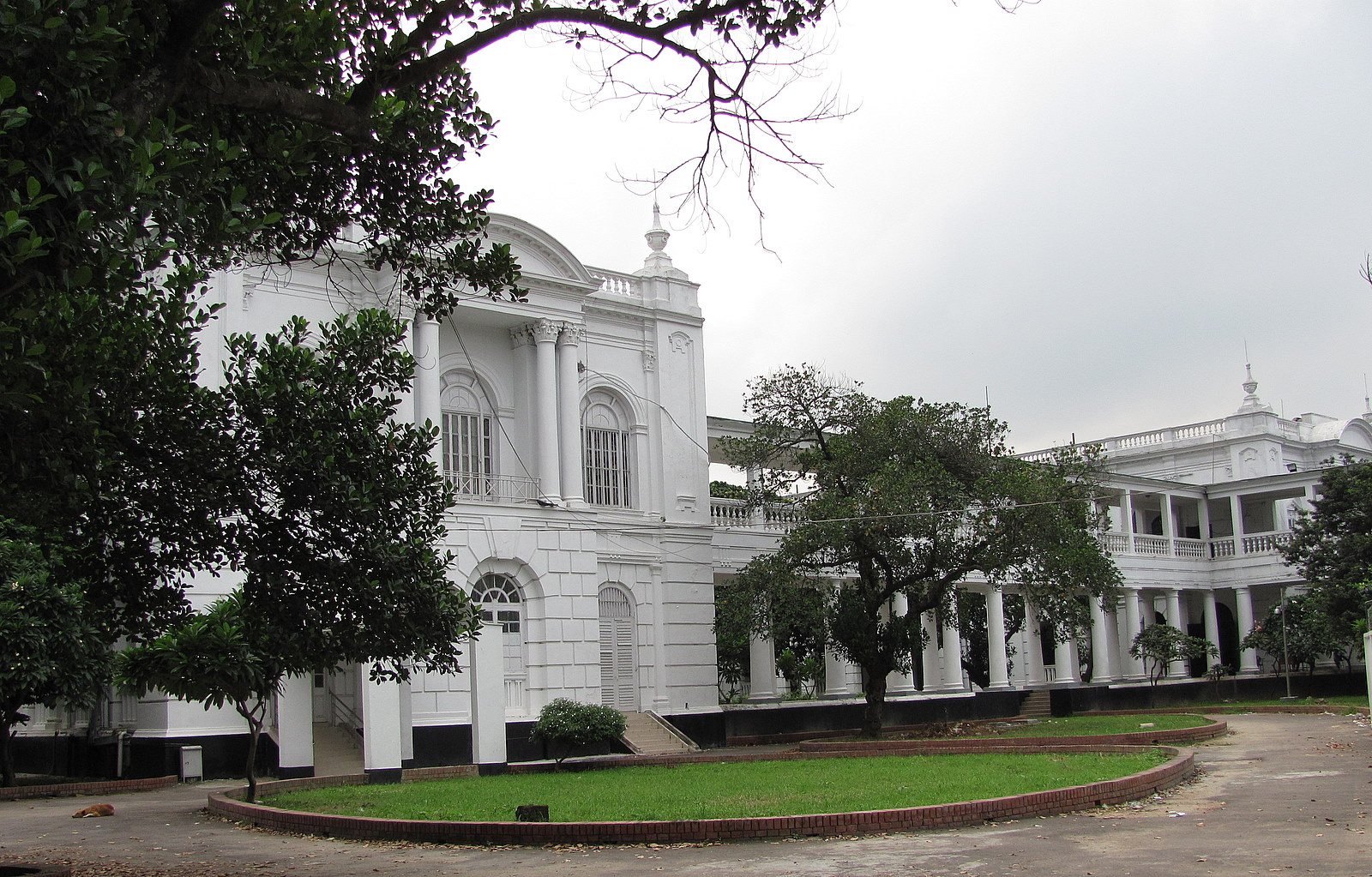
Old High Court Building

The High Court of Judicature for East Bengal, commonly known as the Dacca High Court, was established in 1947 under the High Courts (Bengal) Order, 1947 as a separate High Court with all appellate, civil and original jurisdictions. It functioned as a part of the Federal Court of Pakistan.

=== The High Court of Judicature at Dacca in East Pakistan (1956 - 1971) ===
With the adoption of the 1956 constitution in Pakistan, the Dacca High Court became the High Court of East Pakistan, and the Supreme Court of Pakistan was established as the apex Court with appellate jurisdiction to hear decisions of the High Courts established in both East and West Pakistan.

Until 1967, the High Court was held in the building that is now known as the Old High Court Building on Kazi Nazrul Islam Avenue, opposite the curzon hall, Dhaka. With the construction of a larger facility in the 1960s nearby that now houses the Supreme Court of Bangladesh and Attorney General's office, the High Court was moved from Old House on 10 July 1967.

=== Chief Justices (1947 - 1971) ===
- Justice Abu Saleh Muhammad Akram (1947 - 1950)
- Justice Muhammad Shahabuddin (1950-1953)
- Justice Amiruddin Ahmad (1954-1956)
- Justice Amin Ahmed (1956 - 1959)
- Justice Mirza Ali Ispahani (1959-1962)
- Justice Imam Hossain Choudhury (1962-1964)
- Justice Syed Mahbub Murshed (1964-1967)
- Justice Badruddin Ahmed Siddiky (1967-1971)

=== Division of the Supreme Court (1971 - present) ===
In 1971, East Pakistan became the independent Republic of Bangladesh. On 17 January 1972, the High Court of Bangladesh Order, 1972 (the President Order No. 5 of 1972) was promulgated to regularize the judicial system. The Order declared that the High Court of Bangladesh would be a Court of Record and would possess original, appellate, special, revisional and review powers, along with all procedural other powers previously exercisable by the High Court of Judicature at Dacca in East Pakistan under any law in force before March 26, 1971. Subsequently, the High Court of Bangladesh Order, 1972 was amended by the High Court of Bangladesh (Amendment) Order 1972 (the President Order No. 91 of 1972) to establish the Appellate Division conferring upon it all the powers formerly vested in the Supreme Court of Pakistan. Following the enactment of the Constitution of Bangladesh, the Supreme Court of Bangladesh was established, comprising two divisions, namely the High Court Division and the Appellate Division.

== Jurisdiction ==
=== Original Jurisdiction ===
The High Court Division can hear a case or suit as Court of first instance. The jurisdiction of the High Court is described in Article 101 of the Constitution of Bangladesh. The High Court Division will deal with original cases, appeals and other judicial functions. Also, under Article 102 of the Constitution of Bangladesh, writ petitions and company and army divisions have original jurisdiction in certain limited cases.

=== Appellate Jurisdiction ===
Any law may confer appellate jurisdiction on the High Court Division on any matter. For example, the Code of Criminal Procedure and the Code of Civil Procedure have conferred on the High Court Division appellate jurisdiction.

== Sitting Permanent Judges of the High Court Division ==
As of September 2026, the list of permanent judges are as follows:

1. Justice M Ashraful Kamal
2. Justice K. M. Kamrul Kader
3. Justice Mohammad Mujibur Rahman Miah
4. Justice Mostofa Zaman Islam
5. Justice Mohammad ullah
6. Justice Abu Taher Mohammad Saifur Rahman
7. Justice Md. Badruzzaman
8. Justice Zafar Ahmed
9. Justice Kazi Md. Ejarul Haque Akondo
10. Justice Khizir Ahmed Choudhury
11. Justice Razik Al-Jalil
12. Justice Bhishmadev Chakrabortty
13. Justice Md. Iqbal Kabir
14. Justice Md. Salim
15. Justice Md. Sohrowardi
16. Madam Justice Fatema Najib
17. Justice Md. Kamrul Hossain Molla
18. Justice S. M. Kuddus Zaman
19. Justice Md. Atowar Rahman
20. Justice Shashanka Shekhar Sarkar
21. Justice Mohammad Ali
22. Justice Mohi Uddin Shamim
23. Justice Md. Riaz Uddin Khan
24. Justice M Khairul Alam
25. Justice S. M. Moniruzzaman*
26. Justice Ahmed Sohel
27. Justice Sardar Mohammad Rashed Jahangir
28. Justice K. M. Hafizul Alam
29. Justice Md Zakir Hossain
30. Justice Md Mahmud Hasan Talukder
31. Justice Kazi Ebadoth Hossain
32. Justice K. M. Zahid Sarwar
33. Justice A. K. M. Zahirul Haque
34. Madam Justice Kazi Zinat Hoque
35. Justice Mohammad Showkat Ali Chowdhury
36. Justice Biswajit Debnath
37. Justice Md. Atabullah
38. Justice Md. Ali Reza
39. Justice Md. Bazlur Rahman
40. Justice K. M. Emrul Kayesh
41. Madam Justice Fahmida Quader
42. Justice Md. Bashir Ullah
43. Justice A. K. M. Rabiul Hassan
44. Justice Md. Golam Mortuza Mozumder
45. Justice Syed Enayet Hossain
46. Justice Md. Mansur Alam
47. Justice Sayed Jahed Mansur
48. Justice K. M. Rasheduzzaman Raja
49. Justice Md. Jabid Hossain
50. Madam Justice Mubina Asaf
51. Justice Kazi Waliul Islam
52. Madam Justice Aynun Nahar Siddiqua
53. Justice Md. Abdul Mannan
54. Madam Justice Tamanna Rahman
55. Justice Md. Shofiul Alam Mahmood
56. Justice Md. Hamidur Rahman
57. Madam Justice Nasreen Akter
58. Madam Justice Shathika Hossain
59. Justice Syed Mohammed Tazrul Hossain
60. Justice Md. Toufiq Inam
61. Justice Yousuf Abdullah Suman
62. Justice Sk. Tahsin Ali
63. Justice Foyej Ahmed
64. Justice Md. Sagir Hossain
65. Justice Sikder Mahmudur Razi
66. Justice Debasish Roy Chowdhury
67. Justice Anwarul Islam (Shahin)
68. Justice Saiful Islam
69. Justice Nurul Islam
70. Justice Sheikh Abu Taher
71. Justice Aziz Ahmed Bhuiyan
72. Justice Rajiuddin Ahmed
73. Justice Faisal Hasan Arif
74. Justice SM Saiful Islam
75. Justice Md Ashif Hasan
76. Justice Md Ziaul Haque
77. Justice Dihider Masum Kabir
78. Madam Justice Jasmine Ara Begum
79. Justice Murad-e-Mawla Sohel
80. Justice Md Zakir Hossain
81. Justice Md Rafizul Islam
82. Justice Md Manjur Alam
83. Justice Md Lutfar Rahman
84. Justice Rezaul Karim
85. Madam Justice Fatema Anwar
86. Justice Mahmud Hasan
87. Justice Abdur Rahman
88. Justice Syed Hasan Zubair
89. Justice AFM Saiful Karim
90. Madam Justice Urmi Rahman
91. Justice SM Iftekhar Uddin Mahmud
