= Ruhul =

Ruhul is a given name. Notable people with the name include:

- M. M. Ruhul Amin (1942–2017), Bangladeshi jurist, 16th Chief Justice of Bangladesh
- Md. Ruhul Amin, Bangladeshi jurist, 15th Chief Justice of Bangladesh
- Mirza Ruhul Amin (1921–1997), Bangladeshi Jatiya Party politician and MP
- Mohammad Ruhul Amin BS (1935–1971), engine room artificer in the Bangladesh Navy awarded the Bir Sreshtho
- Moulvi Ruhul Amin, Member of the 4th National Assembly of Pakistan as a representative of East Pakistan
- Ruhul Amin (born 1971), Bangladeshi-born British film director
- Ruhul Amin (Bangladeshi film director) (1940–2013), Bangladeshi film director
- Ruhul Amin (Kurigram politician) (born 1956), Bangladeshi politician and MP
- Ruhul Amin (mufti) (born 1962), Bangladeshi Islamic scholar and educator
- Ruhul Amin (Patuakhali politician) (1949–2014), Bangladeshi politician
- A.B.M. Ruhul Amin Howlader (born 1953), Bangladeshi Jatiya Party politician
- Ruhul Amin Madani (born 1971), Bangladeshi politician and MP
- Md. Ruhul Quddus (born 1962), Bangladeshi justice of the High Court Division of the Supreme Court of Bangladesh
- Shah Md. Ruhul Quddus, Bangladesh Jamaat-e-Islami politician and MP
- Ruhul Kabir Rizvi, Bangladeshi politician
- Nurul Amin Ruhul, also known as Ruhul Bhai (born 1959), Bangladeshi politician
- Md. Ruhul Alam Siddique, the High Commissioner of Bangladesh to Pakistan
- Ruhul Quddus Talukdar (born 1962), Bangladeshi politician, lawyer, former deputy minister and former MP

== See also ==
- BNS Shaheed Ruhul Amin (1974), an ex-Canadian coastal passenger-cargo vessel acquired by the Bangladeshi Navy in 1974
- BNS Shaheed Ruhul Amin (1994), Island-class offshore patrol vessel of the Bangladesh Navy used as a training ship
- Ruhul Amin (disambiguation)
- Rahal (disambiguation)
- Rahul
- Rohal
- Rohel
