= Asaduzzaman Siddiqui v. Bangladesh =

2015–16 Bangladesh Supreme Court case

- Court: High Court Division, Supreme Court of Bangladesh
- Full case name: Advocate Asaduzzaman Siddiqui & others v. Government of Bangladesh & others
- Decided: 5 May 2016

Case history
- Appealed to: Appellate Division, Supreme Court of Bangladesh

Holding
- 16th Amendment to the Constitution of Bangladesh declared unconstitutional and void

Court membership
- Chief judge: Moyeenul Islam Chowdhury
- Associate judges: Quazi Reza-Ul Hoque; Md. Ashraful Kamal

The Advocate Asaduzzaman Siddiqui & others v. Government of Bangladesh & others is a constitutional case concerning the 16th Amendment to the Constitution of Bangladesh. In its ruling, the High Court declared the amendment unconstitutional and void. The Appellate Division also upheld the decision.

== Background ==
Right after independence, the Parliament of Bangladesh had the authority to remove judges from office. In 1975, when Bangladesh transitioned to a presidential state, this power shifted to the president. During the regime of Ziaur Rahman, the 5th constitutional amendment transferred the authority to an independent body known as the Supreme Judicial Council, with the chief justice serving as its leader.

In 2014, the government made the 16th amendment to the constitution. This amendment gave Parliament the power to remove judges. Law Minister Anisul Huq said that even if the power to impeach judges is given to Parliament, judges cannot be removed simply because they don't like their rulings. There must be specific allegations of misconduct or incompetence against the judge, and an independent body will verify these allegations.

Multiple political parties, including the Bangladesh Nationalist Party, and lawyers' organizations opposed this amendment. At that time, they claimed that the government wanted to establish political control over the judiciary.

== Legal proceedings ==
=== High Court Division ruling ===
On 5 November 2014, nine lawyers, led by Asaduzzaaman Siddiqui, filed a writ petition with the High Court Division. The petitioners said that the amendment might have been driven by bad faith, and the judges might feel threatened before issuing an order against a lawmaker. On 9 November, the High Court issued a rule to the government asking why the 16th amendment should not be scrapped. For this ruling, the High Court convened a panel of three judges, headed by Moyeenul Islam Chowdhury.

On 21 May 2015, the court began its hearing. It heard expert opinions from five amici curiae. On 5 May 2016, based on a 2–1 split verdict, the court declared the 16th Amendment to the Constitution void and unconstitutional. Moyeenul Islam and Quazi Reza-Ul Hoque gave their judgment in favour of declaring the amendment illegal, while Md. Ashraful Kamal opposed.

=== Appellate Division ruling ===
The state appealed the High Court's verdict on 4 January 2017. The next month, the Appellate Division appointed ten senior lawyers as amici curiae to hear opinions from senior advocates in this case. Out of them, nine said that the power to remove judges should not be with the parliament. Only Azmalul Hosen Qasi gave his opinion in favor of giving this power to the parliament.

On 8 May, the appeal hearing began. The case was heard in the Appellate Division for eleven days. On 3 July, the Chief Justice Surendra Kumar Sinha, along with a seven-judge appellate bench, unanimously declared the sixteenth amendment illegal and upheld the High Court's verdict.

In the ruling, Sinha criticized various issues including the liberation war, national politics, democracy, military rule, and the judiciary's independence, prompting backlash from Awami League ministers and leaders, who called for his resignation. Sinha also faced criticism in parliament and from Prime Minister Sheikh Hasina. Anisul Huq described the ruling as containing irrelevant political remarks and indicated they would challenge it legally, though they respected the verdict despite disagreements.

After the Appellate Division ruling, the state filed a review petition. On 20 October 2024, a six-member bench of the Appellate Division, headed by Chief Justice Syed Refaat Ahmed, dismissed the review petition and reinstated the Supreme Judicial Council.

== Reactions ==
The government opposed the verdict. Attorney General Mahbubey Alam expressed his frustration and disappointment with the Appellate Division's decision. The state counsel stated that the government aimed not to change the constitution but to restore the original version through this amendment. Civil Aviation and Tourism Minister Rashed Khan Menon also opposed, saying, "The court cannot change the decision of a sovereign parliament."

The main opposition parties in parliament, the Jatiya Party and Jatiya Samajtantrik Dal, also criticized the court's verdict, stating it set a bad precedent for the judiciary to invalidate any law passed by parliament.

The Bangladesh Nationalist Party praised the verdict. Ruhul Kabir Rizvi described it as a "victory for the Bangladeshi people" during a briefing.

== See also ==
- Amendments to the Constitution of Bangladesh
- Fifteenth Amendment to the Constitution of Bangladesh
