= Ruhul Amin =

Ruhul Amin (Arabic: رُوح الأَمِين, romanized: Rūḥ al-Amīn, lit. 'Trustworthy Spirit'; transliterations vary) may refer to:

== People ==
- Ruhul Amin (Bangladeshi film director) (1940–2013), Bangladeshi film director
- Ruhul Amin (British film director) (born 1971)
- Ruhul Amin (Kurigram politician) (born 1956), Bangladeshi politician and MP of Kurigram-4
- Ruhul Amin (Patuakhali politician) (1949–2014)
- Ruhul Amin (scholar) (born 1962), Bangladeshi mufti and educator
- Ruhul Amin (diplomat), Bangladeshi diplomat
- Ruhul Amin Madani (born 1952), Bangladeshi politician and MP for Mymensingh-7
- Roohul Amin, Afghan politician
- Roohul Amin Khan (born 1961), Pakistani judge
- Mirza Ruhul Amin (1921–1997), Bangladeshi politician and MP for Thakurgaon-2
- Moulvi Ruhul Amin, Pakistani-Bengali politician and MLA of Noakhali
- Mohammad Ruhul Amin (1934–1971), Bangladesh Navy sailor, killed during the Bangladesh Liberation War
- Md. Ruhul Amin, 15th Chief Justice of Bangladesh
- M. M. Ruhul Amin (1942–2017), 16th Chief Justice of Bangladesh
- A. B. M. Ruhul Amin Howlader (born 1953), Bangladeshi politician and MP of Patuakhali-1

== See also ==
- Jibril
- Amin (name)
- BNS Shaheed Ruhul Amin, the name of two ships of the Bangladesh Navy
- Bir Shrestha Shahid Ruhul Amin Stadium, now Bir Shrestho Flight Lieutenant Matiur Rahman Cricket Stadium, Bangladeshi cricket stadium in Chittagong
