= Syed Shahidur Rahman =

Bangladeshi Judge

Justice of the High Court Division of Bangladesh

Honourable Judge
- In office April 2003 – 20 April 2004
- Appointed by: Iajuddin Ahmed

Personal details
- Party: Bangladesh Jamaat-e-Islami
- Profession: Judge

Syed Shahidur Rahman was an additional judge of the High Court Division who was impeached for corruption.

== Career ==
Shahidur Rahman faced allegation of misappropriation of funds while he was in the Bangladesh Supreme Court Bar Association. In April 2003, Shahidur Rahman was appointed an additional judge of the High Court Division. His appointment was opposed by the bar association and senior lawyers due to the allegation of embezzlement from the association.

In October 2003, Rokanuddin Mahmud, president of the bar association, accused Shahidur Rahman of taking bribes for bails. The allegation led to the formation of the first ever Supreme Judicial Council in Bangladesh. The council, led by Chief Justice Khondokar Mahmud Hasan, investigated the allegations and submitted their report on 26 January 2004.

On 20 April 2004, Shahidur Rahman was removed from his judgeship by President Iajuddin Ahmed on the recommendation of the Supreme Judicial Council and consent of Prime Minister Khaleda Zia. He had received 50 thousand taka bribe from an accused. A High Court Division verdict had declared Shahidur Rahman's removal illegal but that was halted by a stay order of the Appellate Division led by Chief Justice J. R. Mudassir Husain. The order was halted following an appeal by Idrisur Rahman, a lawyer of Supreme Court.

Chief Justice Surendra Kumar Sinha led panel of four judges upheld the removal of Justice Shahidur Rahman on 16 September 2015.

On 1 September 2026, Rahman joined Bangladesh Jamaat-e-Islami.
