= Ruhul Islam =

Bangladeshi jurist

The Honourable Ruhul Islam
- রুহুল ইসলাম

Justice of the High Court Division of Bangladesh

Personal details
- Profession: Justice

Ruhul Islam is a retired Justice of the Appellate Division of the Bangladesh Supreme Court.

== Career ==
In 1976, the Supreme Court was divided into two by martial law order and Ruhul Islam was appointed chief justice of the High Court. He served in that position till 1977, when the courts were merged into one again by martial law order.

On 30 December 1978 during martial law, Chief Justice Kemaluddin Hossain, Justices Fazle Munim, Ruhul Islam, and KM Subhan issued a verdict declaring martial law tribunal verdicts cannot be challenged in any courts with justice Subhan dissenting. The verdict was overturned in December 2012 by the Supreme Court of Bangladesh.

On 3 March 1979, Ruhul Islam was removed from the Supreme Court by General Ziaur Rahman along with Justices Abdul Mumit Chowdhury, Ahsan Uddin Chowdhury, Debesh Bhattacharya, Siddique Ahmed Chowdhury, and Syed A B Mahmud Husain.

In 1981, Ruhul Islam led the investigation into the murder of General Muhammed Abul Manzur who had accused of being involved in the assassination of Ziaur Rahman, President of Bangladesh.
