= Khondokar Mahmud Hasan =

13th Chief Justice of Bangladesh

Khondokar Mahmud-ul Hasan
- খন্দকার মাহমুদ-উল হাসান

13th Chief Justice of Bangladesh
- In office 23 June 2003 – 26 January 2004
- Appointed by: Iajuddin Ahmed
- Prime Minister: Khaleda Zia
- Preceded by: Mainur Reza Chowdhury
- Succeeded by: J. R. Mudassir Husain

Ambassador of Bangladesh to Iraq
- In office 1980–1982

Personal details
- Born: 27 January 1939 (age 87)
- Education: University of Dhaka; University of London

Khondokar Mahmud-ul Hasan (known as Justice KM Hasan; born 27 January 1939) is a Bangladeshi jurist who served as the 13th Chief Justice of Bangladesh during 2003–2004. He served as a diplomat while serving as the ambassador of Bangladesh to Iraq during 1980–1982.

== Early life and education ==
Hasan was born on 27 January 1939. His father, Khondokar Mohammed Hasan, was a justice from Munshiganj District. Hasan holds BA and MA degrees in history from the University of Dhaka, LLM from the University of London, and is a Barrister-at-Law from Lincoln's Inn. (Note: Department of History at the University of Dhaka mentioned Hasan as a notable alumni at "Home :: Dhaka University".)

== Career ==
Hasan began his legal career in 1963 as an advocate of the Supreme Court of Bangladesh. Hasan was a member of the Bangladesh Bar Council. He served as ambassador to Iraq during 1980–1982.

Hasan was appointed a judge to the High Court Division on 13 July 1991. He was elevated as a judge to the Appellate Division on 20 January 2002. He refused to hear the case of the assassination of the President Sheikh Mujibur Rahman as one of the accused, Colonel Farooq, was his relative creating a potential conflict of interest. Rahman's daughter and then leader of Awami League leader, Sheikh Hasina argued a judge should not be embarrassed to hear a case while he had taken an oath to keep himself beyond any family ties with anyone.

In June 2003, Hasan was appointed as the Chief Justice of Bangladesh replacing Justice Mainur Reza Chowdhury. Bangladesh Supreme Court Bar Association boycotted this as this appointment superseded Justices Mohammad Fazlul Karim and Md. Ruhul Amin. Minister of Law Moudud Ahmed claimed it was done to correct a past wrong as Hasan was superseded in the past. President Rokanuddin Mahmud of the Bangladesh Supreme Court Bar Association said it was the standard practice to appoint the senior most judge on the Appellate Division as the chief justice. Attorney General A. F. Hassan Ariff welcomed his appointment and hoped he would strengthen the judiciary.

In 2004, Hasan opened an investigation against Justice Syed Shahidur Rahman following an allegation of corruption.

Justice J. R. Mudassir Husain succeeded Hasan in January 2004 as the next chief justice; it superseded Justice M Ruhul Amin again.

=== Crisis with the Chief Adviser appointment ===
In 2004, the Bangladesh Nationalist Party government raised the age of retirement for judges from 65 to 67 through a constitutional amendment, which made Hasan eligible to be the next chief adviser of the caretaker government responsible for holding election in 2006 as the last retired chief justice. His candidacy was opposed by Awami League. Sheikh Hasina opposed his appointment and alleged Hasan was not a neutral person to hold the position since he had been the international affairs secretary of the BNP in the past. The two parities tried to come to an agreement through negotiations led by Abdul Mannan Bhuiyan and Abdul Jalil. There were violent street protests, strikes, and fights between the two parties. His appointment was also opposed by Sammilita Nagorik Andolon and 11 other leftist political parties. The controversy surprised Hasan himself. Syed Badrul Ahsan recommended Hasan to refuse the position. The Awami League preferred Justice Mahmudul Amin Chowdhury according to its communication with foreign diplomats while the BNP supported election commissioner M. A. Aziz as an alternate. On 23 October 2006, Hasan met with Patricia Butenis, then ambassador of the United States to Bangladesh. On 28 October, he refused the position of chief adviser and then BNP appointed President Iajuddin Ahmed to the position. After taking the position, Ahmed invoked marital law which ultimately led to his replacement by Fakhruddin Ahmed, backed by Bangladesh Army. Awami League would win the 2008 Bangladeshi general election, and Khaleda Zia would later state it was a mistake appointing Iajuddin Ahmed.

== Post-judicial life (2006–present) ==
In May 2006, the government allocated one katha of land from Dhanmondi Police Station to Hasan who had requested land bordering his plot for building a sweeper passage. The land and building was allocated to Sheikh Rehana on 21 July 2001 but was turned into a police station in 2005 after the Bangladesh Nationalist Party (BNP) came to power.

Hasan served as a part-time law lecturer at the University of Dhaka, and Honorary Secretary and Director of the Bangladesh Institute of Law and International Affairs. He also served as the president of the Commonwealth Secretariat Arbitral Tribunal in London. He co-authored Legal Aspects of Population Planning in Bangladesh.

In January 2017, BNP recommended Hasan for the search committee for the Election Commission. Obaidul Quader, general secretary of the Awami League, opposed the nomination.

In December 2023, Hasan attended a get together of all ten living former chief justices at the official residence of the incumbent chief justice, Obaidul Hassan.

== Personal life ==
Hasan is married to Shamim Hasan, a daughter of Abul Kashem Khan, an industrialist who founded A K Khan & Company.
