= Supreme Judicial Council of Bangladesh =

Judicial body in Bangladesh

The Supreme Judicial Council is a judicial body in Bangladesh responsible for investigating allegations of misbehaviour or incapacity and recommending the removal of judges of the Supreme Court of Bangladesh. It is composed of three judges from the Appellate Division and is led by the Chief Justice of Bangladesh.

== History ==
Initially, the Constitution of Bangladesh empowered Parliament of Bangladesh to investigate allegations against judges. The Fourth Amendment to the Constitution removed Parliament's power to do so and transferred it to the President. The proclamation of martial law in 1978 removed this authority from the President and established the Supreme Judicial Council, which was incorporated into the constitution in 1979 through the Fifth Amendment. In 2005, the High Court declared the Fifth Amendment illegal but retained the Supreme Judicial Council. In 2010, the Appellate Division upheld the verdict and ruled that the Supreme Judicial Council would remain valid until 31 December 2011. In 2011, the 9th Jatiya Sangsad passed the Fifteenth Amendment to the Constitution, allowing the Supreme Judicial Council to continue.

In 2014, the 10th Jatiya Sangsad abolished the Supreme Judicial Council by passing the Sixteenth Amendment. Following a writ petition, the High Court declared the Sixteenth Amendment unconstitutional and void on 5 May 2016. On 3 July 2017, the Appellate Division dismissed the government's appeal and upheld the High Court's verdict. The government filed a review petition on 24 December 2017. The Supreme Court rejected it on 20 October 2024 and restored the council.

== Structure ==
The Supreme Judicial Council is headed by the Chief Justice of Bangladesh and comprises the two senior-most judges of the Supreme Court. It can investigate allegations of misconduct or incapacity against an accused judge. If, after the investigation, the Supreme Judicial Council submits a report to the President affirming the allegations, the President would impeach the judge by an order.

== See also ==
- Judiciary of Bangladesh
