= Kemaluddin Hossain =

3rd Chief Justice of Bangladesh

3rd Chief Justice of Bangladesh
- In office 1 February 1978 – 11 April 1982
- Appointed by: Ziaur Rahman
- President: Ziaur Rahman; Abdus Sattar
- Prime Minister: Mashiur Rahman; Shah Azizur Rahman
- Preceded by: Syed A. B. Mahmud Hossain
- Succeeded by: Fazle Kaderi Mohammad Abdul Munim

Personal details
- Born: 31 March 1923 Kolkata, British India
- Died: 21 August 2013 (aged 90) Dhaka, Bangladesh

Kemaluddin Hossain (31 March 1923 – 21 August 2013) was a Bangladeshi jurist who served as the third Chief Justice of Bangladesh from 1 February 1978 until 11 April 1982. He was a chairman of Bangladesh Law Commission.

== Early life ==
Hossain was born on 31 March 1923 in Kolkata. He graduated from St. Xavier's College, Kolkata in 1945. He completed his law degree from Calcutta University's Law college. He passed the Chamber's examination from the Calcutta High Court and was awarded the Sir Rashbehary Ghosh Memorial medal. He migrated to East Pakistan (present-day Bangladesh) after the 1950 riot.

== Career ==
On 30 December 1978 during martial law, Chief Justice Kemaluddin Hossain, Justices Fazle Munim, Ruhul Islam, and KM Subhan issued a verdict declaring martial law tribunal verdicts cannot be challenged in any courts with justice Subhan dissenting. The verdict was overturned in December 2012 by the Supreme Court of Bangladesh.

== Death ==
He died on 21 August 2013 at the age of 90.

== Personal life ==
In 1953, Hossain married Sultana Begum whose family had migrated from Jalpaiguri district, West Bengal.
