= Muhammad Imman Ali =

Bangladeshi Supreme Court justice

Justice of the High Court Division of Bangladesh

Personal details
- Parent(s): Israil Ali (Farther); Alifjan Bibi (Mother)
- Profession: Judge

Muhammad Imman Ali (born 1 January 1956) is a retired judge of the Appellate Division of the Bangladesh Supreme Court. He is dual Nationality Bangladeshi/British.

== Early life ==
Ali was born in East Bengal, Dominion of Pakistan (now Bangladesh) on 1 January 1956 to Israil Ali and Alifjan Bibi.

== Career ==
Ali started his career as an advocate on 21 June 1979. From September 1998 to February 2001, Ali served as the Deputy Attorney General of Bangladesh.

On 22 February 2001, Ali was appointed a Judge on the Bangladesh High Court. He taught at the Judicial Administration Training Institute.

His book, Towards a Justice Delivery System for Children in Bangladesh, was published in 2010 by UNICEF. In March 2010, Justice Md Abu Tariq and Ali declared it illegal to try people under a repealed law following a convict who had been sentenced to death under Women and Child Repression Act, 1995 which was replaced by the Women and Child Abuse Suppression Act, 2000. On 23 February 2011, Ali was appointed to the Bangladesh Supreme Court.

In 2015, Ali was part of a bench led by A. B. M. Khairul Haque that ordered Fatwa could not violate Bangladeshi laws.

Ali was part of the bench that declared 16th Amendment to the Constitution of Bangladesh, the right of parliament to impeach judges, illegal in 2017.

In November 2018, Ali temporarily served as the Chief Justice of Bangladesh. Ali further served as the temporary chief justice in July 2019.

In September 2019, he upheld the bail order on Toufique Imrose Khalidi who was facing criminal charges by the Anti Corruption Commission.

On 2 September 2021, Ali pardoned Ashraful Islam Ashraf, a lawyer, who made offensive remarks about the chief justice on Facebook. He presided over a ceremony of Bangladesh International Mediation Society in October 2021.

On 26 October 2021, Ali ordered Counter Terrorism and Transnational Crime to investigate the assets of Rajarbagh Darbar Shareef and its head Dillur Rahman.

After the retirement of Chief Justice Syed Mahmud Hasan, Ali was the senior-most judge in the Appellate Division. Scheduled to retire a year later, he was passed over for the top job and immediately went on a leave of absence. Justice Hasan Foez Siddique was appointed as 23rd Chief Justice. Ali retired in December 2022.
