= Md. Khasruzzaman =

Bangladeshi judge

- মো. খসরুজ্জামান

Supreme Court of Bangladesh

Personal details
- Born: 28 October 1968 (age 57)
- Profession: Judge

Md. Khasruzzaman (born October 28, 1968) is a judge of the High Court Division of Bangladesh Supreme Court.

== Early life ==
Khasruzzaman was born on 28 October 1968. He has a bachelor's and master's degree in law.

== Career ==
Khasruzzaman became a lawyer of the District Courts on 16 August 1994.

On 29 September 1996, Khasruzzaman a lawyer on the High Court Division of Bangladesh Supreme Court.

Chief Justice Md Fazlul Karim refused to administer the oath to Khasruzzaman and Md. Ruhul Quddus in April 2010. Khasruzzaman was facing allegations of vandalizing the Supreme Court and kicking the door of the chief justice J. R. Mudassir Husain on 30 November 2006. His appointment was opposed by the Bangladesh Nationalist Party dominated Supreme Court Bar Association led by Khandaker Mahbub Hossain. Khasruzzaman was appointed an additional judge of the High Court Division of Bangladesh Supreme Court 4 November 2010.

On 14 October 2012, Khasruzzaman was made a permanent judge of the High Court Division of Bangladesh Supreme Court.

On 26 May 2015, Khasruzzaman and Justice Md Rezaul Haque granted bail to Bangladesh Nationalist Party politician Rafiqul Islam Miah in seven separate criminal cases.

On 18 January 2017, Khasruzzaman and Justice Sheikh Abdul Awal issued bail to Amanur Rahman Khan Rana, Member of Parliament for Tangail-3, who was charged in the murder of Faruk Ahammed.

On 8 December 2020, Khasruzzaman and Justice Md Mahmud Hassan Talukder ordered the government to block all online portals owned by Kanak Sarwar for anti-state propaganda.

Khasruzzaman and Justice Md. Mahmud Hassan ordered the Ministry of Environment, Forest and Climate Change to submit a probe report on the death of 11 zebras and one lion and tiger at Bangabandhu Sheikh Mujib Safari Park on 15 February 2022.

On April 1, 2024, the vacation bench of the High Court, comprising Justices Md Khasruzzaman and KM Zahid Sarwar, suspended the Bangladesh University of Engineering and Technology’s (BUET) ban on student politics. This decision, influenced by a writ petition from Awami League-backed student organization Bangladesh Chhatra League leader Imtiaz Hosain Rabbi, effectively lifts the previous restrictions on political activities at the university. These restrictions were originally imposed after a group of Bangladesh Chhatra League men murdered a second-year student named Abrar Fahad at the university’s Sher-e-Bangla Hall on October 7, 2019.
