= Fifth Amendment to the Constitution of Bangladesh =

The Fifth Amendment to the Constitution of Bangladesh ratified and confirmed all proclamations, orders, regulations and laws, and amendments, additions, modifications, substitutions and omissions made in the constitution during the period between 15 August 1975 and 9 April 1979 (both days inclusive) by the authorities when the country was under martial law. It was passed on 6 April 1979 by the newly convened parliamentary session led by President Ziaur Rahman.

== Background ==
With the assassination of President Sheikh Mujibur Rahman on 15 August 1975, his autocratic one-party state was to put to an end and democratic republicanism was restored by a military-backed presidency with the proclamation of martial law in a state of emergency. Khondaker Mostaq Ahmad, the new president, under martial law, issued a proclamation to amend the Constitution in order to omit the provision for the legal basis of one-party system. His successor, former chief justice and President Abu Sadat Mohammad Sayem issued a number of proclamations. The first one, on 31 December 1975, amended Articles 66 and 122 of the Constitution, which disenfranchised those convicted under the Bangladesh Collaborators (Special Tribunal) Order 1972 from being elected as members of parliament and registered as voters. This notably included Shah Azizur Rahman, who later served as prime minister under President Ziaur Rahman and his vice-president and successor, Abdus Sattar.

The next two proclamations amended Article 6 and omitted the proviso to Article 38 to officially include the non-Bengalis of the country as citizens, and Muslim nationalist and far-right political parties as legal associations. The final proclamation restored the enforcement of fundamental rights through the power of the High Court Division and substituted the parts regarding the judiciary.

When Ziaur Rahman assumed acting presidency on Sayem's resignation, he made a proclamation amending the Preamble to the Constitution based on his omission of Article 12 and amendment of Article 8 to de-secularise state policy, substituting Articles 9 and 10 with new articles to remove proposals for Bengali nationalism and economic socialism, and inserting a clause to encourage fraternal policy towards Muslim nations. When elected as president in 1978, he issued a second proclamation that removed the provision of absolute veto power of the president introduced by Mujib, inserted authorization of presidential expenditure in some cases with or without parliamentary approval, amendments regarding the power of the judiciary, as well as addition of a proviso of referendum regarding fundamental amendments to the Constitution.

In 1979, after full restoration of multi-party democracy by President Ziaur Rahman, the country's second parliamentary term convened in 1979 which passed the amendment.

== Effects ==
The following lists the effects of the amendment:

- Abolition of one-party system introduced by the fourth amendment
- Partial restoration of the independence of judiciary (Article 95 and 116) which was curtailed by the fourth amendment
- Restoration of the jurisdiction of the High Court Division to enforce fundamental rights as was provided in original Articles 44 and 102 of the Constitution
- Insertion of the provision of the Supreme Judicial Council (Article 96)
- Abolition of the provision of absolute veto power of the President as introduced by the fourth amendment (Article 80)
- Introduction of the provision of referendum in respect of amendment of Articles 142 (1A), (1B) and (1C) of the Constitution
- The insertion of the words "Bismillahir Rahmanir Rahim" (Note: In the name of God, the Merciful and the Compassionate) at the beginning of the Constitution i.e. above the Preamble, thereby making Islam as the de-facto state religion (Note: Islam would be formally declared as the state religion of Bangladesh in 1988 by Ziaur Rahman's successor, Hussain Muhammad Ershad.) & marking a dramatic shift away from socialism towards rule under Islam.
- Amending the original Article 6 of the Constitution which provided that the citizens of Bangladesh would be known as "Bengalees [sic]" by the substituted Article 6 providing that citizens of Bangladesh would be known as "Bangladeshis" in order to distance the state away from secular Bengali nationalism & its people from the Bengali Hindu population of India.
- Original Article 9 of the Constitution was also substituted by a new article promoting local governmental institutions
- Replacing the word "secularism" as was provided in original Article 8(1) of the Constitution with the words "absolute trust and faith in the Almighty Allah" and the insertion of a new sub article (1A) containing the words "Absolute trust and faith in the Almighty Allah shall be the basis of all actions", thereby legitimising political Islam.
- Giving new explanation to "Socialism" as mentioned in original Article 8(1) that socialism would mean only economic and social justice
- Omission of Article 12
- Substitution of original Article 10 of the Constitution by a new article providing "participation of women in national life"
- Omission of the entry for those "convicted of any offence under the Bangladesh Collaborator (Special Tribunals) Order 1972" from each of the provisos of disqualification to Articles 66 and 122 respectively regarding election to parliament and voter registration
- Omission of the proviso to Article 38 from the original constitution
- Addition of new Article 92A giving the President the power to expend public moneys in certain cases even without the approval of the Parliament
- Inserting of another new Article 145A providing that all international treaties would be submitted to the President who should cause them to be laid before Parliament by second proclamation
- Inserting of a new clause in Article 25 determining the state policy of consolidating, preserving and strengthening fraternal relations with Muslim countries "based on Islamic solidarity", thereby going back to the days of Muslim nationalism that had died out due to the impact of the Bengali language movement in 1950s.

== Supreme Court decision and controversy ==
On 29 August 2005, the High Court Division of the Supreme Court of Bangladesh, in a landmark verdict, declared that the amendment is illegal. On 25 May 2009, two leave-to-appeal petitions, one of which was filed by three SC lawyers and the other by the secretary-general of Zia's party, the BNP, were filed with the SC against the verdict. On 2 February 2010, with Mujib's party, the Awami League, in power during the second Hasina ministry, the verdict was upheld by the SC's Appellate Division with some exceptions. Moudud Ahmed, barrister, law minister of the Bangladesh Nationalist Party government, and former Prime Minister of Bangladesh, said that he feared a constitutional vacuum would be created by the SC decision and told the court that Zia made the necessary amendment to the constitution in accordance with law, as the people of the country had given him the mandate for it through a referendum. He also believed that the judgment reflects the personal political views of the Chief Justice S. K. Sinha, who came from the Hindu community, that had been adversely affected by Zia's policies of Islamisation.

== Fifteenth amendment ==
Regarding the changes made by the fifth amendment, the fifteenth amendment, passed without a referendum or serious deliberations on 25 June 2011, omitted paragraph 18 of the Fourth Schedule, regarding the actions taken under martial law, thus technically legalising Mujibur Rahman's one-party state and outlawing the martial law governments, along with making the judiciary and parliament subservient to the President and eliminating fundamental rights, and proceeded to

- reincorporate "secularism" and remove "absolute trust and faith in the Almighty Allah" as well as it being "the basis of all actions", and also omit any liberal interpretation of socialism, in order to restore Mujibism as the fundamental principles of the state policy
- omit the referendum proviso to Article 142 regarding such an amendment
- add "The people of Bangladesh shall be known as Bangalees as a nation" to Article 6
- revert Article 9 to the original one defining the basis of the nationalism as being Bengali linguocultural identity
- reinstate Article 12, which defined the principle of secularism
- revert Article 10 to the original one espousing economic socialism
- restore the entry for those convicted under the Bangladesh Collaborators (Special Tribunals) Order, 1972 in each of the disqualification provisos regarding election and voter registration
- restore the provision in Article 38 that deprives anyone of the right to form associations or unions on the grounds of religion, race, sex, birthplace or language
- omit clause 25(2) regarding the state policy of fraternal relations with Muslim countries based on "Islamic solidarity", thus undermining membership in OIC
