= Muhammad Ibrahim (justice) =

Pakistani politician

Muhammad Ibrahim মুহাম্মদ ইব্রাহিম محمد ابراہیم
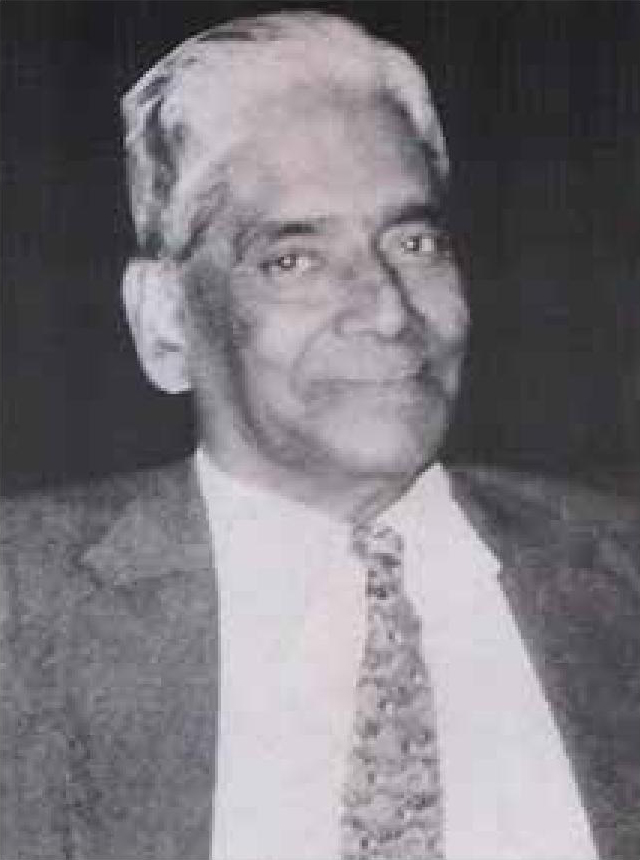

Minister of Law of Pakistan
- In office 1958–1962
- President: Ayub Khan

8th Vice-Chancellor of the University of Dhaka
- In office 9 November 1956 – 27 October 1958
- Preceded by: Walter Allen Jenkins
- Succeeded by: Hamoodur Rahman

Personal details
- Born: September 1894 Shaildubi, Sadarpur, Faridpur, Bengal Presidency, British India
- Died: 13 October 1966 (aged 71–72) Dacca, Pakistan
- Children: Sufia Ahmed
- Education: Dhaka College
- Occupation: Academic

Muhammad Ibrahim (known as Justice M Ibrahim; September 1894 – 13 October 1966) was a Pakistani judge and academic who served as the 8th Vice-chancellor of the University of Dhaka from 1956 to 1958. From 1958 to 1962, he was the law minister of Pakistan.

== Early life and education ==
Ibrahim was born in September 1894 in Shaildubi village of Sadarpur Upazila in Faridpur District to Ghiyasuddin Ahmed. Ibrahim passed matriculation exam from Barisal Zilla School and intermediate exam from Dhaka College in 1916 and 1918 respectively. He completed his bachelor's in English literature. He then studied Law under the persuasion of Nares Chandra Sen-Gupta. He earned a law degree in 1921.

== Career ==
Ibrahim practiced law at Faridpur during 1922–1923, and joined the Dhaka District Bar in 1924. He also served as a part-time teacher at the University of Dhaka from 1924 until 1943. He became a public prosecutor at the Dhaka District Court in 1939. He was appointed an Additional District and Sessions Judge in 1943 and elevated to the Dhaka High Court Bench in 1950. He retired as a High Court Judge in 1956.

He served as the Chairman of the Election Tribunal and later as the Vice-Chancellor of the University of Dhaka from November 1956 until October 1958.

He was appointed the Minister of Law by Pakistani President Ayub Khan and served in the position during 1958–1962.

== Personal life ==
Ibrahim was married to Lutfuennessa Ibrahim. Together they had a daughter Sufia Ahmed, a National Professor of Bangladesh. Their grandson, Syed Refaat Ahmed, served as the Chief Justice of Bangladesh in 2024 and 2025.
