= Syed Ishtiaq Ahmed =

Former attorney general and former adviser of the caretaker government of Bangladesh

- সৈয়দ ইশতিয়াক আহমেদ

3rd Attorney General of Bangladesh
- In office 22 March 1976 – 6 May 1976
- Appointed by: Abu Sadat Mohammad Sayem
- President: Abu Sadat Mohammad Sayem
- Preceded by: Faqueer Shahabuddin Ahmad
- Succeeded by: Khandaker Abu Bakr

Adviser for Law, Justice and Parliamentary Affairs
- In office 31 March 1996 – 23 June 1996
- President: Abdur Rahman Biswas
- Preceded by: Muhammad Jamiruddin Sircar
- Succeeded by: Abdul Matin Khasru
- In office 15 July 2001 – 10 October 2001
- President: Shahabuddin Ahmed
- Preceded by: Abdul Matin Khasru
- Succeeded by: Moudud Ahmed

Adviser for Local Government, Rural Development and Co-operatives
- In office 31 March 1996 – 23 June 1996
- President: Abdur Rahman Biswas
- Preceded by: Abdus Salam Talukder
- Succeeded by: Zillur Rahman

Adviser for Civil Aviation and Tourism
- In office 15 July 2001 – 10 October 2001
- President: Shahabuddin Ahmed
- Preceded by: Sayed Ashraful Islam
- Succeeded by: Mir Mohammad Nasiruddin

Personal details
- Born: 16 January 1932 Ghazipur, North-Western Provinces, British India
- Died: 12 July 2003 (aged 71) Dhaka, Bangladesh
- Spouse: Sufia Ahmed (m. 1955)
- Children: Syed Refaat Ahmed; Tasneem Raina Fateh
- Parent: Syed Zafar Ahmed (father)
- Education: Dhaka College; University of Dhaka; London School of Economics
- Occupation: attorney general

Syed Ishtiaq Ahmed (16 January 1932 – 12 July 2003) was a Bangladeshi lawyer and constitutionalist. He was a former attorney general of Bangladesh. He served as an adviser on law to the non-party caretaker government in two successive terms.

== Background and education ==
Ahmed and his family originated from Ghazipur in present-day Uttar Pradesh, India. He had four elder brothers and one younger one. He got his elementary education in Ramanath High English School in Hili, Dakshin Dinajpur where his father, Syed Zafar Ahmed, had a business. He also studied in Calcutta Madrasa in Kolkata, West Bengal.

Ahmed passed the matriculation and intermediate exam from Mymensingh Zilla School in 1948 and Dhaka College in 1950 respectively. He completed his bachelor's and master's in economics at the University of Dhaka in 1953 and 1954 respectively. He obtained his second master's in economics from London School of Economics in 1958.

== Career ==
Ahmed joined The Honourable Society of Lincoln's Inn and became a barrister in 1958. He then taught in a higher secondary school in London until he returned to Bangladesh in 1960. He then started practicing law at the East Pakistan High Court. He worked as an associate barrister at the chamber of Barrister ATM Mustafa at Ramkrishna Mission Road in Dhaka.

Ahmed was appointed additional attorney general in 1972 and attorney general in 1976. He was the permanent representative of Bangladesh to the United Nations in 1978. He was recruited as a member of the International Election Observer Group and monitored national elections of Sri Lanka, Nepal, and the Maldives. He served as an adviser to the Caretaker government of Bangladesh in 1991 and again in 2001. He was twice elected president of the Supreme Court Bar Association, during 1978–79 and 1989–90.

Ahmed taught law at the University of Dhaka as a part-time faculty member from 1961 to 1968 and served the university as a senior legal adviser from 1972 to 1991. He established the law firm Syed Ishtiaq Ahmed & Associates.

Ahmed was the president of the Rotary Club of Dhaka North, life member of the Bangla Academy, the Asiatic Society of Bangladesh, the Bangladesh Itihas Parisad, the board of trustees of Centre for Policy Dialogue.

== Personal life ==
Ahmed married Sufia Ibrahim in June 1955. Sufia is an academic and the first female National Professor of Bangladesh. Together they had one son Syed Refaat Ahmed, who became the 25th Chief Justice of Bangladesh, and a daughter, Tasneem Raina Fateh, a physician.

Ahmed had been suffering from diabetes, anaemia and encephalopathy. He died of old-age complications at BIRDEM Hospital in Dhaka on 12 July 2003.

On 18 July 2004, Sufia established a trust fund titled "Barrister Syed Ishtiaq Ahmed Memorial Foundation" at the Asiatic Society of Bangladesh.
