= S. K. Sinha =

S. K. Sinha may refer to:

- Shri Krishna Sinha (1887–1961), the first chief minister of the Indian state of Bihar (1946–61)
- Srinivas Kumar Sinha (1926–2016), Indian army, later ambassador to Nepal, later governor of Assam and Jammu and Kashmir
- Surendra Kumar Sinha (born 1951), Chief Justice of Bangladesh
