= Sufia Ahmed =

Bangladeshi academic (1932–2020)

- সুফিয়া আহমেদ
- Born: 20 November 1932; Faridpur District, Bengal Presidency, British India
- Died: 9 April 2020 (aged 87); Dhaka, Bangladesh
- Education: Brojomohun College; University of Dhaka
- Occupation: Academic
- Spouse: Syed Ishtiaq Ahmed (m. 1955; died 2003)
- Children: Syed Refaat Ahmed; Tasneem Raina Fateh
- Father: Muhammad Ibrahim
- Awards: Ekushey Padak

Sufia Ahmed (née Ibrahim; 20 November 1932 – 9 April 2020) was a Bangladeshi academic. She was selected as the first female National Professor of Bangladesh in January 1995. She was awarded Ekushey Padak in 2002 by the Government of Bangladesh.

== Career ==
Ahmed was born in the Faridpur District to M Ibrahim, a judge and former vice-chancellor of the University of Dhaka and Lutfunnessa Ibrahim. She studied at Dow Hill Girls' School in Darjeeling, but after the Partition of Bengal in 1947, the family moved to Barisal. Ahmed was a student at Brojomohun College in Barisal. In 1950, she got admitted to the University of Dhaka. She was one of the female forerunners to break section 144 and violate the curfew at the university's campus on February 21, 1952. She earned her Ph.D. in 1960 in London.

Ahmed joined as a faculty member at the Department of Islamic History and Culture of the University of Dhaka in 1961. She was a visiting professor of Boğaziçi University in Istanbul and Alverno College in Milwaukee, Wisconsin.

Ahmed served as a member of board of the directors of Bangladesh Bank. She was the president of Bangladesh Itihas Parishad.

== Personal life ==
Ahmed married Barrister Syed Ishtiaq Ahmed in June 1955. Together they had a son, Syed Refaat Ahmed, who became the 25th Chief Justice of Bangladesh and a daughter, Raina Ahmed, a physician.

On July 18, 2004, Sufia Ahmed established a trust fund titled "Barrister Syed Ishtiaq Ahmed Memorial Foundation" at the Asiatic Society of Bangladesh.

The two children of Sufia Ahmed established a trust fund titled "National Professor Dr. Sufia Ahmed Memorial Foundation" on November 20, 2020 at the Asiatic Society of Bangladesh.

== Awards ==
- Sufia Kamal Award (2015)
- Ekushey Padak (2002)
