= Mohammad Fazlul Karim =

Bangladeshi judge (1943–2024)

- মোহাম্মদ ফজলুল করীম

18th Chief Justice of Bangladesh
- In office 8 February 2010 – 30 September 2010
- Appointed by: Zillur Rahman
- President: Zillur Rahman
- Prime Minister: Sheikh Hasina
- Preceded by: Md. Tafazzul Islam
- Succeeded by: A.B.M. Khairul Haque

Personal details
- Born: 30 September 1943 Suchakradandi village, Patiya, Chittagong District, Bengal Province, British India
- Died: 16 November 2024 (aged 81) Dhaka, Bangladesh

Mohammad Fazlul Karim (30 September 1943 – 16 November 2024) was a Bangladeshi jurist who served as the 18th Chief Justice of Bangladesh.

== Early life ==
Fazlul Karim was born in Chittagong, East Bengal, British India on 30 September 1943. Karim graduated from the University of Dhaka with a law degree.

== Career ==
From 1965 to 1992, Fazlul Karim was a lawyer of the Supreme Court of Bangladesh.

On 15 June 2001, Fazlul Karim was made a Judge on the Appellate Division of Bangladesh Supreme Court.

Fazlul Karim was the Chief Justice from 8 February 2010 to 30 September 2010 as the 18th chief justice of Bangladesh. His predecessors M. M. Ruhul Amin and Md. Tafazzul Islam became Chief Justices superseding him. In April 2010, he refused to administer the oath of office to two nominees, Md. Khasruzzaman and Md. Ruhul Quddus, to the High Court Division. Khasruzzaman was accused of vandalizing the courts during protest and Quddus was accused of murder. Fazlul Karim sentenced Editor of Amar Desh, Mahmudur Rahman and its reporter, Oliullah Noman, to six months and one month imprisonment respectively on contempt of court charges.

== Death ==
Fazlul Karim died on 16 November 2024, at the age of 81.
