= Satkhira Government College =

Government college in Satkhira, Bangladesh

Coordinates: 22.708895°N 89.086584°E

- সাতক্ষীরা সরকারি কলেজ
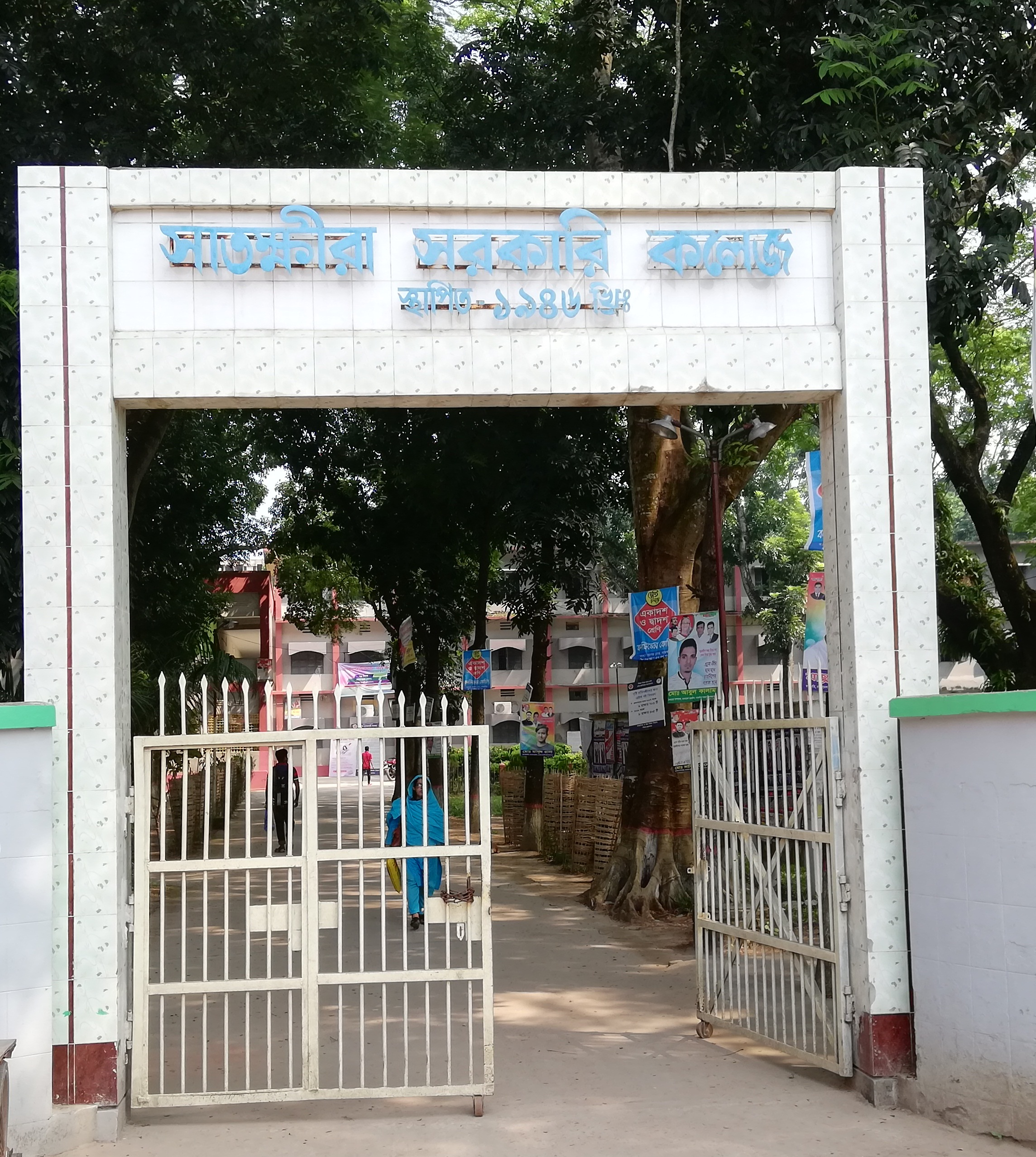
- Former name: রাজার বাগান কলেজ
- Motto: জ্ঞানই শক্তি (Bengali)
- Type: Affiliate college of National university
- Established: 1946 (80 years ago)
- Affiliations: National University
- Principal: Professor Amanullah Al Hadi
- Students: 15000+
- Location: Satkhira, Bangladesh
- Campus: Rajarbagan, Wards -3, Satkhira Sadar, Satkhira-9400
- Website: satkhiragovtcollege.edu.bd

Satkhira Government College is a government college in Satkhira, Bangladesh. Affiliated with National University, the college has 16 departments and 2 student hostels.

== Notable alumni ==
- Pori Moni, actress
- Hasan Foez Siddique, Chief Justice of Bangladesh
