= Mohammad Tafazzul Islam =

17th Chief Justice of Bangladesh

Tafazzul Islam

17th Chief Justice of Bangladesh
- In office 23 December 2009 – 7 February 2010
- Appointed by: Zillur Rahman
- Preceded by: M. M. Ruhul Amin
- Succeeded by: Mohammad Fazlul Karim

Personal details
- Born: 8 February 1943 (age 83) Lalpur, Tippera district, Bengal Presidency, British India
- Relations: Md Mainul Islam (brother), Atiqul Islam (brother)
- Education: University of Dhaka

Mohammad Tafazzul Islam (born 8 February 1943) is a Bangladeshi who served as the 17th Chief Justice of Bangladesh.

== Early life and education ==
Islam was born on 8 February 1943 in Lalpur village of Tippera district, British India (now in Titas Upazila, Bangladesh). His father, Momtazuddin Ahmed, was a police officer. Islam graduated with a Bachelor of Arts (Honours) in history from the University of Dhaka, continuing to complete his master's in the same subject and then graduated with Bachelor of Laws (LL.B) under the University of Dhaka. Later he completed a postgraduate diploma Bar vocational course and became a Barrister-at-Law in 1967. Islam stood first in Bangla recitation in the literary competition of Salimullah Muslim Hall in years 1959 and 1960. While doing the BVC in London, he was a news broadcaster in BBC.

== Career ==
Islam was called to the Bar of England and Wales from the Honourable Society of Lincoln's Inn in 1967. He enrolled as an advocate of the High Court of East Pakistan in 1969. Later, in 1980, he became an advocate in the Appellate Division of the Supreme Court of Bangladesh.

He was elevated to the bench in 1994, as a judge of the High Court Division, and then to the Appellate Division of the Supreme Court of Bangladesh in 2003. In 2009, he was appointed as the Chief Justice of Bangladesh.

During the period he was an advocate, Islam had been actively associated with the teaching profession. He was an adjunct faculty in the City Law College, Dhaka teaching The Transfer of Property Act, 1882 and Equity and Trust. He also taught Corporate law at the Institute of Business Administration, University of Dhaka, and was an Examiner in Law department of Dhaka University. As a member of the Corporate Law Commission of Bangladesh, he actively participated in the drafting of Bank Company Act, 1991 and The Companies Act (Bangladesh), 1994.

While a judge of the Supreme Court Division, he also held the offices of Chairman of the Enrollment Committee of the Bangladesh Bar Council, from 2004 to 2008, and of the chairman of the Bangladesh Judicial Service Commission during 2008–9.

Md. Tafazzul Islam was appointed as a member of the Permanent Court of Arbitration (PCA) at The Hague in September 2015 for a six-year term.

Mr. Islam was appointed to the Panel for Conciliators of the World Bank's International Centre for Settlement of Investment Disputes (ICSID) for a period of six years extending through 26 April 2027.

== Judgments ==
Islam was the principal author of several landmark judgments, laying the foundations for the development of laws and setting significant precedents. These include the judgments on repeal of the Fifth Amendment of the Constitution of Bangladesh, upholding the judgment of the High Court Division sentencing the killers of Sheikh Mujibur Rahman, enlarging the powers of the High Court Division under The Companies Act (Bangladesh), 1994 in protecting the interests of minority shareholders, and reversing the decision of the High Court Division to allow the construction of markets in violation of the provisions of environmental laws.
