= Khandaker Abu Bakr =

Bangladeshi lawyer

Attorney General of Bangladesh
- President: Abu Sadat Mohammad Sayem
- Preceded by: Syed Ishtiaq Ahmed
- Succeeded by: Mohammad Nurullah

Minister of Law, Justice and Parliamentary Affairs
- Preceded by: Shah Azizur Rahman
- Succeeded by: Ataur Rahman Khan

Khandaker Abu Bakr was a high-ranking Bangladeshi lawyer, civil servant, and politician who served as the attorney general of Bangladesh for nine years. He also served as Minister of Law, Justice and Parliamentary Affairs for two years.

== Career ==
Khandaker Abu Bakr had been appointed by the president, Abu Sadat Mohammad Sayem, as the attorney general of Bangladesh on 10 May 1976, succeeding Syed Ishtiaq Ahmed, and his tenure had lasted till 13 March 1985, upon which he was replaced by Mohammad Nurullah as attorney general of Bangladesh.

Abu Bakr had also served as the Minister of Law, Justice and Parliamentary Affairs of Bangladesh starting from 27 March 1982, succeeding Shah Mohammad Azizur Rahman until 1 June 1984, whereupon he was succeeded by Ataur Rahman Khan.
