= Md. Abdul Wahhab Miah =

Former acting Chief Justice of Bangladesh

Abdul Wahhab Miah
- আবদুল ওয়াহহাব মিয়া
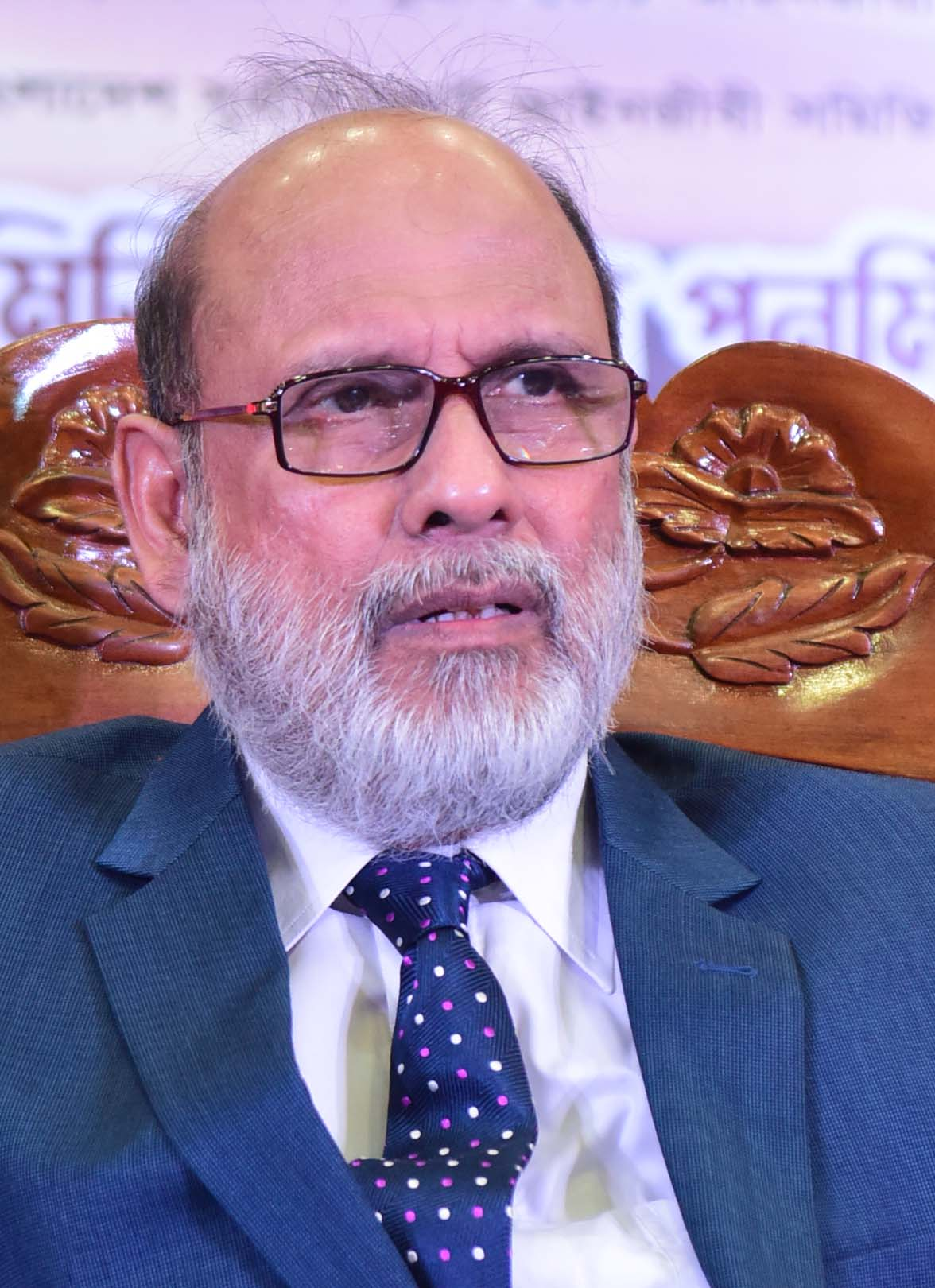
- Wahhab in 2014

Acting Chief Justice of Bangladesh
- In office 12 November 2017 – 2 February 2018
- Appointed by: Abdul Hamid
- President: Abdul Hamid
- Prime Minister: Sheikh Hasina
- Preceded by: Surendra Kumar Sinha
- Succeeded by: Syed Mahmud Hossain

Personal details
- Born: 11 November 1951 (age 74)

Abdul Wahhab Miah (born 11 November 1951) is a prominent Bangladeshi judge, former designated senior advocate of the Supreme Court of Bangladesh and law teacher. He was appointed as acting Chief Justice of Bangladesh when 21st Chief Justice of Bangladesh Surendra Kumar Sinha left. Prior to assuming the position of Chief Justice, he served as a judge in the Appellate Division of the Supreme Court of Bangladesh.

== Career ==
Justice Miah was enrolled as an advocate in High Court Division in 1976. He was appointed an additional judge to the High Court Division on 24 October 1999 and became a permanent judge in 2001. He was elevated to the Appellate Division on 23 February 2011. He served as acting Chief Justice of Bangladesh when Chief Justice Surendra Kumar Sinha left. He resigned from his post on 2 February 2018 though he was set to retire on 10 November 2018. Since 2019, he is serving as a 'distinguished adjunct professor' at law department of North South University.
