= Syed AB Mahmudul Huq =

Bangladeshi judge

Justice of the High Court Division of Bangladesh

Personal details
- Profession: Judge

Syed AB Mahmudul Huq is a judge of the High Court Division of Bangladesh Supreme Court.

== Career ==
In July 2008, Mahmudul Huq and 18 other judges opposed a High Court Division verdict that ordered the government to restore judgeship of 10 additional judges whose appointment was not confirmed by the Bangladesh Nationalist Party government. The ten judges were appointed by an Awami League government while the 18 of the 19 judges opposing were appointed by the Bangladesh Nationalist Party. Mahmudul Huq and Justice Moyeenul Islam Chowdhury expressed embarrassment to hear the Barapukuria coal mine graft case against former Prime Minister Khaleda Zia in October 2008.

In February 2009, Mahmudul Huq and Justice Moyeenul Islam Chowdhury gave a split verdict in a bail petition one asked them to surrender to a lower court while the other judge asked them to appear before the bench.

Barrister Rafique Ul Huq shouted and cursed at Justice Moyeenul Islam Chowdhury in a hearing. Justice Mahmudul Huq and Justice Moyeenul Islam Chowdhury summoned Rafique following a contempt of court petition against him following the outburst. In March 2009, Justice Mahmudul Huq and Justice Moyeenul Islam Chowdhury granted bail to Chowdhury Irad Ahmed Siddiky son of Chowdhury Tanbir Ahmed Siddiky in a defamation case filed by ASM Hannan Shah. Justice Mahmudul Huq and Justice Moyeenul Islam Chowdhury granted bail 199 students of University of Rajshahi and activists of Bangladesh Islami Chhatra Shibir in a case over assaulting a Bangladesh Chhatra League leader. They granted bail to 24 Bangladesh Chhatra League activist in a case over the murder of a leader of Bangladesh Islami Chhatra Shibir.

Mahmudul Huq and Justice M Akram Hossain Chowdhury granted bail Khan Tipu Sultan, member of parliament, and his wife in a case filed over the death of their daughter-in-law in 2014. Mahmudul Huq and Justice Md Akram Hossain Chowdhury granted bail Rubel Hossain, member of the Bangladesh National Cricket Team in a case filed by Naznin Akhter Happy, an actress, who alleged Rubel had an intimate affair with her on the promise of marriage but refused to marry her afterwards.

In August 2016, Mahmudul Huq, justice Naima Haider and justice Qazi Reza-Ul-Hoque cancelled a court order that declared the Ashiyan City housing project illegal.
