= Md Abu Tariq =

Bangladeshi judge

- মো. আবু তারিক

Justice of the High Court Division of Bangladesh

Personal details
- Profession: Judge

Md Abu Tariq is a retired justice of the High Court Division of the Bangladesh Supreme Court.

== Career ==
Abu Tariq served in the Bangladesh Liberation War in 1971.

In June 2008, Justice ABM Khairul Haque and Abu Tariq held hearings on suo moto contempt rule against Ekramul Huq and other journalists after a magazine published a report on a High Court judge whitening black money. Khairul Haque and Abu Tariq declared Contempt of Court Ordinance, 2008 illegal due to provision allowing "constructive criticism" of judgement.

In July 2008, Abu Tariq was one of 19 judges who filed an appeal against a High Court verdict reinstating 10 judges of the High Court Division whose appointment was not confirmed by the Bangladesh Nationalist Party. The ten judges were appointed by an Awami League government while 18 out of the 19 judges were appointed by a Bangladesh Nationalist Party government.

In March 2010, Abu Tariq and Justice Muhammad Imman Ali declared it illegal to try people under a repealed law following a convict who had been sentenced to death under Women and Child Repression Act, 1995 which was replaced by the Women and Child Abuse Suppression Act, 2000.

Abu Tariq was a trustee board member of The University of Comilla (UNIC).
