= Zinat Ara =

Bangladeshi jurist

The Honourable Justice Zinat Ara
- জিনাত আরা

Supreme Court Division of Bangladesh
- Incumbent
- Assumed office 27 April 2003

Personal details
- Born: 15 March 1953 (age 73)
- Parent(s): H.M.R. Siddiqui (father); Begum Ayesha Siddiqui (mother)
- Education: University of Dhaka
- Profession: Judge

Zinat Ara (born March 15, 1953) is a former judge of the Appellate Division. She was the third female judge in the High Court Division and the second female judge in the Appellate Division. In 2024, the interim government appointed her as the chairperson of the Law Commission.

== Early life and education ==
Ara was born on 15 March 1953. Her father's name is H.M.R. Siddiqui and mother's name is Begum Ayesha Siddiqui. She passed her LLB and LLM from University of Dhaka.

== Career ==
Ara was elevated as additional judge of the High Court Division on 27 April 2003 and appointed judge on 27 April 2005. In 2007, 1st time in the history of the country's judiciary, Justice Zinat Ara and Justice Farah Mahbub the 2 female judges had conducted a division bench of the High Court in order to deliver justice to the people. On 2 October 2024, the Yunus interim government appointed her as the chairperson of the Law Commission of Bangladesh.
