= Hasan Foez Siddique =

23rd Chief Justice of Bangladesh

- হাসান ফয়েজ সিদ্দিকী
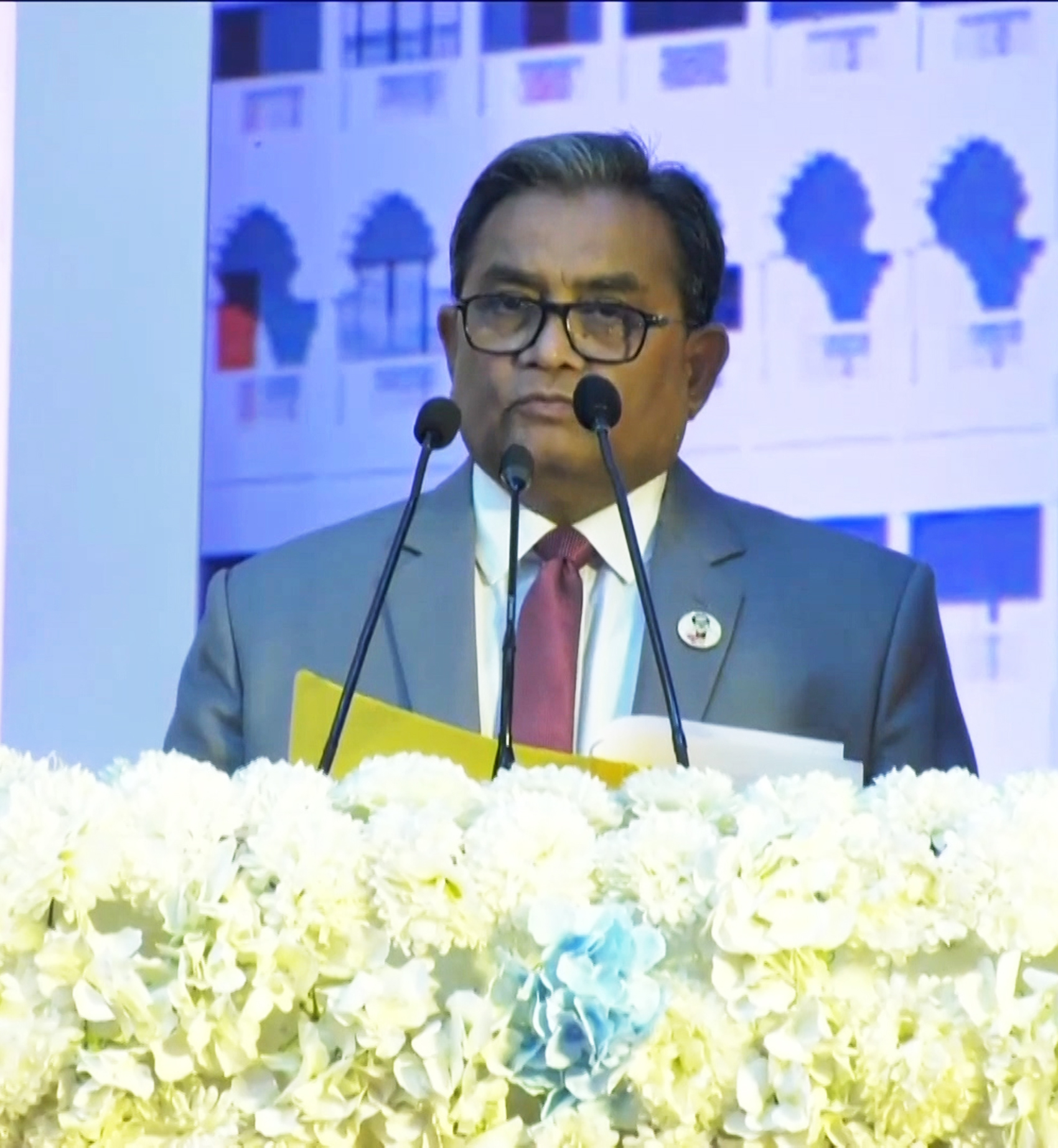
- Siddique in 2022

23rd Chief Justice of Bangladesh
- In office 31 December 2021 – 25 September 2023
- Appointed by: Abdul Hamid
- President: Abdul Hamid; Mohammed Shahabuddin
- Preceded by: Syed Mahmud Hossain
- Succeeded by: Obaidul Hassan

Personal details
- Born: 26 September 1956 (age 70)
- Education: Satkhira Government College; University of Dhaka; Dhanmondi Law College

Hasan Foez Siddique (born 26 September 1956) is a Bangladeshi lawyer and jurist who served as 23rd Chief Justice of the Supreme Court of Bangladesh.

== Early life and education ==
Siddique was born on 26 September 1956 to Abdul Gofur Mollah and Nurjahan Begum. He passed SSC from Khoksa Janipur Pilot High School in 1972 and ISC from Government P.C. College in 1974. After passing Bachelor of Arts from Satkhira Government College, he took his MSS (Masters in Social Science) degree from the Department of Political Science, University of Dhaka. He later passed Bachelor of Laws from Dhanmondi Law College and enrolled as an advocate at the District & Sessions Judge Court, Dhaka in 1981.

== Career ==
Siddique was enrolled as an advocate of the District Court, the High Court Division and the Appellate Division of the Supreme Court of Bangladesh in 1981, 1983 and 1999 respectively. He acted as legal advisor to Khulna City Corporation, Kushtia Municipality, Jalalabad Gas Transmission Company, and chief law advisor of the Ministry of Home Affairs.

On 24 December 2007, he was appointed as an additional attorney general of Bangladesh. He resigned from the post on 4 June 2008, citing difficulties in discharging his duties. Elevated as judge of the High Court Division in 2009 and as a judge of the Appellate Division of the Supreme Court of Bangladesh in 2013.

Siddique was appointed the chairman of Bangladesh Judicial Service Commission on 30 April 2015. In September 2019, he briefly served as the Chief Justice of Bangladesh in absence of the Chief Justice. He was re-appointed as the chairman of Bangladesh Judicial Service Commission on 4 May 2020.

On 21 June 2021, Siddique issued an order halting the bail of those accused of attacking a motorcade of Prime Minister Sheikh Hasina. On 30 December 2021, he was appointed as the chief justice. On this appointment, he superseded justice Muhammad Imman Ali, the most senior Appellate Division judge. He retired on 25 September 2023 from chief justice of Bangladesh.

== Personal life ==
Siddique is married to Dalia Firoz. His elder brother, Abu Bakar Siddique, is a retired judge of the Appellate Division.
