= Fazle Kaderi Mohammad Abdul Munim =

Bangladeshi jurist

- ফজলে কাদেরী মোহাম্মদ আবদুল মুনিম

4th Chief Justice of Bangladesh
- In office 12 April 1982 – 30 November 1989
- Appointed by: Ahsanuddin Chowdhury
- President: Ahsanuddin Chowdhury; Hussain Muhammad Ershad
- Prime Minister: Ataur Rahman Khan; Mizanur Rahman Chowdhury; Moudud Ahmed; Kazi Zafar Ahmed
- Preceded by: Kemaluddin Hossain
- Succeeded by: Badrul Haider Chowdhury

Personal details
- Born: 1 December 1924 Dhaka Bikrampur, Bengal Presidency, British India
- Died: 16 February 2001 (aged 76) Dhaka, Bangladesh
- Resting place: Azimpur Graveyard, Dhaka
- Education: University of London

Fazle Kaderi Mohammad Abdul Munim (also known as FKMA Munim; 1 December 1924 – 16 February 2001) was a Bangladeshi jurist who served as the 4th Chief Justice of Bangladesh and as the first chief of the Bangladesh Law Commission.

== Early life ==
Abdul Munim was born on 1 December 1924 in Khilgaon village of Joinsar Union in Sirajdikhan upazila of Dhaka Bikrampur (now Munshiganj), former East Bengal (now Bangladesh), British India. His father was Mohammed Abdul Khalique, a retired Deputy Magistrate living in Lalbagh, Dhaka. Abdul Munim's paternal uncle was the Bengali poet Kaykobad.

In 1951, Abdul Munim joined the Dhaka High Court Bar. He finished his LLM and Ph.D. degrees from the University of London in 1960.

== Career ==
In 1964, Abdul Munim started his practice as an advocate of the Supreme Court of Pakistan. He was a member of both the provincial East Pakistan Bar Council and the national Pakistan Bar Council. In 1970, he was made the Advocate General of East Pakistan.

In 1970, he became a judge of the Dhaka High Court. After the independence of Bangladesh, he then became a judge in the high court of Bangladesh. He worked on the drafting of the constitution of Bangladesh.

In 1976, Abdul Munim was made a judge in the Supreme Court of Bangladesh. He was made the Chief Justice of Bangladesh in 1982 and retired from his post in November 1989. On 6 August 1996, he was made the chairman of the Bangladesh Law Commission. He resigned from the commission on 31 December 1997, citing health reasons.

== Personal life ==
Abdul Munim's spouse was Syeda Nurunnahar. They had five sons and one daughter, who died in childhood.
