= Moyeenul Islam Chowdhury =

Bangladeshi Judge

Justice of the High Court Division of Bangladesh

Personal details
- Born: January 9, 1953 (age 73)
- Profession: Judge

Moyeenul Islam Chowdhury is a retired judge of the Bangladesh High Court.

== Early life ==
Chowdhury was born on 9 January 1953 in Sylhet, East Pakistan. completed his law degree, bachelor's, and master's in art from the University of Dhaka.

== Career ==
On 17 March 1982, Chowdhury became an assistant judge in the judicial service of the Bangladesh Civil Service.

On 1 March 1998, Chowdhury was promoted to district and district and session judge.

On 23 August 2004, Chowdhury was appointed an additional judge of the High Court Division.

Chowdhury became a permanent judge on 23 August 2006.

Barrister Rafique Ul Huq shouted and cursed at Chowdhury in a hearing. Chowdhury and Justice Syed AB Mahmudul Huq summoned Rafique following a contempt of court petition against him following the outburst. In March 2009, Chowdhury and Justice Syed AB Mahmudul Huq granted bail to Chowdhury Irad Ahmed Siddiky son of Chowdhury Tanbir Ahmed Siddiky in a defamation case filed by ASM Hannan Shah. Chowdhuy and Justice Syed Refaat Ahmed heard a petition challenging the Chittagong Hill Tracts Peace Accord filed by a Bengali settler in the Chittagong Hill Tracts and Bangladesh Jammat e Islami lawyer. Chowdhury and Syed AB Mahmudul Huq granted bail 199 students of University of Rajshahi and activists of Bangladesh Islami Chhatra Shibir in a case over assaulting a Bangladesh Chhatra League leader. They granted bail to 24 Bangladesh Chhatra League activist in a case over the murder of a leader of Bangladesh Islami Chhatra Shibir.

In May 2012, Chowdhury granted anticipatory bail to 30 Bangladesh Nationalist Party politicians including Mirza Fakhrul Islam Alamgir.

Chowdhury and Justice Md Ashraful Kamal scrapped a provision of the Anti Corruption Commission act which curtailed the independence of the commissioners in 2015. He and Justice Md Ashraful Kamal issued a split verdict challenging the parliamentary membership of Mofazzal Hossain Chowdhury Maya who had been convicted in a corruption case. He asked Maya for an explanation while Kamal rejected the petition.

In April 2016, the Bangladesh Supreme Court to issue a verdict on the legality of Dhaka Metropolitan Police collecting information on tenants in Dhaka. In March the court declared the collection legal and dismissed the petition.

In October 2018, Chowdhury gave a split verdict with Justice Ashraful Kamal on a petition challenging the "fictitious" case filed by the government of Bangladesh against politicians of the opposition Bangladesh Nationalist Party. Chowdhury sought an explanation from the government why it should not be declared illegal while Kamal said the cases could not be called fictitious and should be properly investigated. Chowdhury and Justice Md Ashraful Kamal asked the government to take action to prevent unnecessary C-sections. Chowdhury and Justice J. B. M. Hassan stopped the recruitment exam of four state owned banks. Chowdhury and Justice Md Ashraful Kamal asked the government to take against members of Bangladesh Police for trading Ya ba in Cox's Bazar District. Chowdhury and Justice Md Ashraful Kamal asked the government to collect taxes from Facebook and Google.

Chowdhury and Justice Md Ashraful Kamal in a verdict recognized Turag river as a living entity and ordered the eviction of encroachers. The verdict scrapped a lease by A. K. Azad of Ha-Meem Group on the banks of the river by Gazipur administration and noted river encroachers cannot contest elections. In August 2019, ordered Chowdhury to finish the trial against Shahidul Alam, founder of Drik Gallery who had been arrested for spreading rumours, and which had been halted following a petition. Chowdhury and Justice Khandaker Diliruzzaman asked the government not to harass Nobel Prize winner Muhammad Yunus.

On 8 January 2020, Chowdhury retired from the High Court Division. He was appointed chairman of Bangladesh Industrial Finance Company Limited by Justice Muhammad Khurshid Alam Sarkar of the High Court Division in January 2021.

Chowdhury was appointed chairman of Destiny Group on 1 September 2022 on an order of Justice Muhammad Khurshid Alam Sarkar of the High Court Division.

== Bibliography ==
- Maintainability of Writ Petition : An Appraisal
