= J. R. Mudassir Husain =

14th Chief Justice of Bangladesh

Syed J R Mudassir Husain
- সৈয়দ জে আর মোদা‍চ্ছির হোসেন
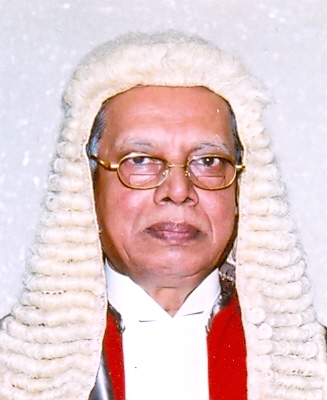

14th Chief Justice of Bangladesh
- In office 27 January 2004 – 28 February 2007
- Appointed by: Iajuddin Ahmed
- President: Iajuddin Ahmed
- Prime Minister: Khaleda Zia; Iajuddin Ahmed (acting); Fazlul Haque (acting); Fakhruddin Ahmed (acting)
- Preceded by: Khondokar Mahmud Hasan
- Succeeded by: Md. Ruhul Amin

Personal details
- Born: 1 March 1940 (age 86) Laskerpur Village, Habiganj, Sylhet District, Assam Province, British India
- Education: University of Dhaka

Syed J. R. Mudassir Husain (born 1 March 1940) is a Bangladeshi jurist who served as the 14th Chief Justice of Bangladesh during 2004–2007.

== Background and education ==
Hussain's family traced their descent from Syed Nasiruddin, a companion of Shah Jalal. Husain's uncle, Syed A. B. Mahmud Hossain, was the second Chief Justice of Bangladesh. Husain completed his BA and LLB from the University of Dhaka.

== Career ==
Husain was enrolled as a High Court advocate in 1965. He was then appointed a High Court judge on 18 February 1992 and elevated to the Appellate Division on 5 March 2002.

Husain was appointed assistant attorney general in 1977 and deputy attorney general on 8 January 1984.

Husain worked as part-time lecturer at Central Law College, Dhaka during 1966–78.

== Personal life ==
Husain is married to Syeda Majida Khatun. Together they had three daughters and a son.
