= Imam Hossain Choudhury =

Bangladeshi Judge

- ইমাম হোসেন চৌধুরী
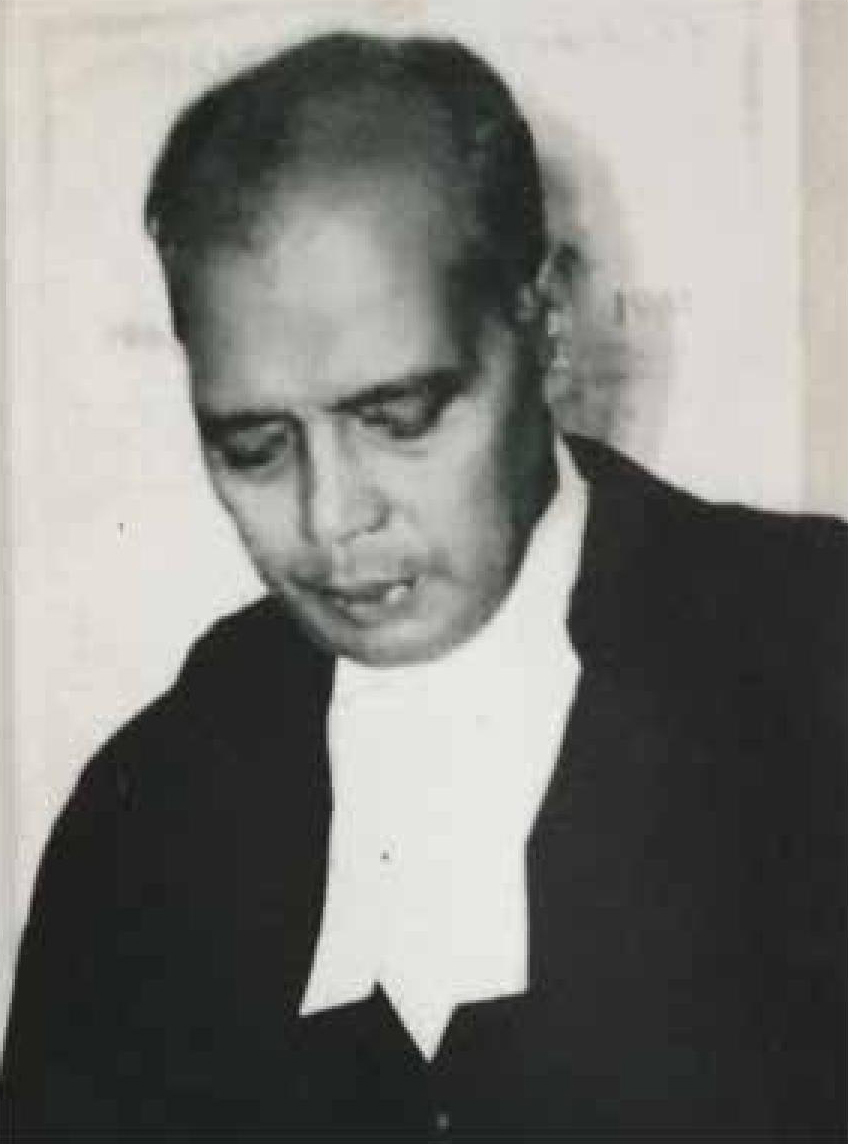

Chief Justice Dacca High Court

Personal details
- Profession: Judge

Imam Hossain Choudhury was the chief justice of Dhaka High Court in East Pakistan.

== Early life ==
Choudhury was born in 1905 in Bhatiary, Chittagong District, East Bengal, British India. He graduated from Chittagong Government College.

== Career ==
Choudhury was an additional judge of the High Court in 1951.

In 1960, Justice Imam Hossain Choudhury succeeded Justice Mirza Ali Ispahani as the chief justice of East Pakistan. He praised Rabindranath Tagore at a time when his works were under attack in East Pakistan.
