= Syed Refaat Ahmed =

25th Chief Justice of Bangladesh

- সৈয়দ রেফাত আহমেদ
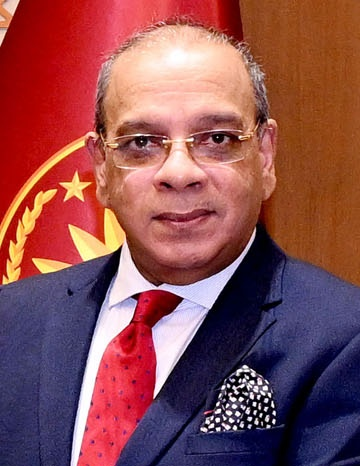
- Ahmed in 2024

25th Chief Justice of Bangladesh
- In office 10 August 2024 – 27 December 2025
- Appointed by: Mohammed Shahabuddin (President of Bangladesh)
- Preceded by: Obaidul Hassan
- Succeeded by: Zubayer Rahman Chowdhury

Personal details
- Born: 28 December 1958 (age 67)
- Parents: Syed Ishtiaq Ahmed (father); Sufia Ahmed (mother)
- Relatives: Muhammad Ibrahim (grandfather)
- Education: University of Dhaka; University of Oxford; Tufts University
- Profession: Judge

Syed Refaat Ahmed (Note: Bengali: সৈয়দ রেফাত আহমেদ) (born 28 December 1958) is a Bangladeshi lawyer and jurist. He served as the 25th chief justice of Bangladesh. Previously, he was the most senior judge at the High Court Division of the Supreme Court of Bangladesh.

== Early life and education ==
Ahmed was born on 28 December 1958. His father, Syed Ishtiaq Ahmed, was a prominent Bangladeshi lawyer and former attorney general of Bangladesh. His mother, Sufia Ahmed, was a National Professor of Bangladesh and a professor of Islamic history and culture at the University of Dhaka. Justice Ahmed's maternal grandfather, Justice Muhammad Ibrahim, was a noted jurist, vice-chancellor of the University of Dhaka, and the law minister of Pakistan.

Ahmed completed his H.S.C. in 1978 from Dhaka College. He completed his bachelor of laws (LL.B) degree with honours at the University of Dhaka. Later, he completed a bachelor of arts (BA) and master's (MA) in jurisprudence at Wadham College of Oxford University. He earned another Master of Arts (MA) in law and diplomacy and PhD at the Fletcher School of Law and Diplomacy administered by Tufts University. Justice Ahmed was awarded the Ford Foundation Fellowship in Public International Law while at The Fletcher School. Ahmed is a Refugee and Migration Law enthusiast and beyond his academic and professional specialisation in these fields has participated in specialist programmes conducted by the International Institute of Humanitarian Law (IIHL), San Remo, Italy. On 26 March 2025, he was conferred an Honorary Fellowship for life by Wadham College, University of Oxford, in recognition of his remarkable achievements. "Wadham College welcomes its new Honorary Fellows for 2025". Wadham College, University of Oxford. Wadham College. 25 April 2025. On 28 May 2025, the Supreme Court Bar Association (SCBA) felicitated Justice Ahmed for being awarded with the prestigious Lifetime Honorary Fellowship by Wadham College, Oxford University.

== Career ==
Ahmed began his career as a lawyer in London's financial district, the City. In 1984, Ahmed was enrolled as an advocate of the Dhaka district and sessions judge Court. He became enrolled as an advocate of the High Court Division in 1986. He also worked at the United Nations High Commissioner for Refugees in Hong Kong and Washington, D.C. In 2002, Ahmed became an advocate of the Appellate Division of the Supreme Court of Bangladesh.

Ahmed was appointed an additional judge of the High Court Division of the Supreme Court on 27 April 2003. In 2003, AHM Shamsuddin Chowdhury Manik accused traffic police officers of contempt of court for not saluting his car. The inspector general of Bangladesh Police, Shahudul Haque, issued a rejoinder that said traffic police are under no obligations to salute anyone, and they could do so if it was safe. The Bangladesh High Court bench of Justice M. A. Matin and Justice Syed Refaat Ahmed issued a contempt of court charge against Haque which automatically removed him from the post of inspector general according to the law. The government of Bangladesh secured a presidential pardon that protected Haque's job. (Note: Multiple references:)

Ahmed was made a permanent judge on the High Court Division on 27 April 2005.

In 2008, commonly known as the UCBL Case, the first of its kind considered under the Companies Act, 1994 read with the Depository Act, 1999 and the Depository (User) Regulations, 2003, Justice Ahmed, through his verdict, ensured the protection of the interests of small-time shareholders against machinations of major equity investors to defeat the interests of the former group's divided entitlements by resort to a pre-fixed Record Date as determinant of closure of the company's Share Register (A.B.M. Khalikuzzaman and Others vs United Commercial Bank and Others [28 BLD (HCD) 2008, 635]).

In 2009, Justice Moyeenul Islam Chowdhury and Justice Syed Refaat Ahmed heard a petition challenging the Chittagong Hill Tracts Peace Accord filed by a Bengali settler in the Chittagong Hill Tracts. The case [Mohammad Badiuzzaman vs. Bangladesh and Others 15 BLC (2010) 531] is commonly known as the Chittagong Hill Tracts (CHT) case. In this case the court faced with a constitutional challenge to the execution of the CHT Peace Accord of 1997 found the Peace Accord to be a political accord between belligerents and, thereby, not to be a subject of Judicial Review. However, a concomitant and corresponding challenge to the CHT Regional Council Act, 1998 stemming from the execution of the CHT Peace Accord, was found to be a colorable piece of legislation given that the establishment of the Regional Council and its consequential powers envisaged in the Act were found to be potentially destructive of the fabric of a unitary Republic.

In his 2012 judgment in Axiata (Bangladesh) Ltd. alias Robi Axiata Ltd. vs. Govt. of Bangladesh and Others, the Court dealt with a revenue matter of some significance by holding that in granting or renewing Cellular Mobile Phone Operator's Licenses, assignments of spectrum, etc., the Bangladesh Telecommunication Regulatory Commission (BTRC) acts as a statutory body that provides statutory taxable services under the Bangladesh Telecommunication Act, 2001 read with the Value Added Tax. 1991. It was found that between the government and a given telecommunication operator there is indeed a place for an intermediate authority like the BTRC that exercises statutory power and engages in taxable economic activity. As to the mode of collection of VAT enunciated in Section 3 and 5 of the VAT Act, 1991 which is always one of an addition of VAT to the total consideration value. Therefore, the modality of deduction under the 'Deduction at Source' scheme was equally found to be one of deduction after, and not prior to, the addition of VAT on the consideration value. Accordingly, it was held incumbent on a licensee telecommunication operator as Robi Axiata Ltd, as a recipient of taxable services supplied by BTRC, to deduct or withhold VAT at source after calculating the same on the entire consideration and thereafter pay directly in the exchequer as the deducting party (Axiata (Bangladesh) Ltd. alias Robi Axiata Ltd. vs. Govt. of Bangladesh and Others) [1 CLR (2012) HCD 77].

In 2013, his ruling in Moulana Md. Abdul Hakim vs. Govt. of Bangladesh & Others [34 BLD (HCD) 2014, 129] extended the frontiers of judicial review under the Bangladeshi Constitutional scheme as the judgment explored the judicial reviewability of actions and decisions of private bodies operating in the public domain.

In October 2017, Justice Md. Salim and Ahmed ordered the government to complete the construction of the Central Effluent Treatment Plant at the Savar tannery estate within four weeks. Justice Md. Salim and Ahmed issued a two-month injunction on member of parliament Mahbubur Rahman Talukder from holding the post of chairman of 11 educational institutions in Patuakhali District.

In 2018, in the case of Syed Saifuddin Kamal vs Bangladesh, Ministry of Health [38 BLD (2018), 453] the court presided over by Justice Ahmed through a collaborative exercise spurred and guided the formulation of the "Emergency Medical Services for Road Accident Victims and Protection of Good Samaritans Policy, 2018".

In April 2018, Justice Md. Salim and Ahmed suspended the term extension of the Accord on Fire and Building Safety in Bangladesh after Smart Jeans filed an appeal after its contract was suspended by the Accord. In December 2018, Ahmed was part of a divided bench on the question of Khaleda Zia participating in the general election. He had asked the Election Commission to accept the nomination of former prime minister Khaleda Zia, while his fellow judge on the bench, Justice Iqbal Kabir, disagreed and blocked the participation of Khaleda Zia.

In 2019, in Human Rights and Peace for Bangladesh vs. Government of Bangladesh case, the Bangladesh Telecommunication Regulatory Commission, under the Court's guidance presided over by Justice Ahmed, formulated the "Guidelines for Limiting Exposure to Radiation of Electromagnetic Fields".

On 28 July 2019, High Court bench led by him banned the marketing of pasteurized milk by 14 companies. Rajdhani Unnayan Kartripakkha on 17 December 2004 allocated a plot in the third phase of Uttara Model Town (sector 15) to Md. Miftah Uddin Choudhury. Rajdhani Unnayan Kartripakkha cancelled the allocation, which was halted by a High Court bench of Justice Md. Iqbal Kabir and Justice Syed Refaat Ahmed, which ordered Rajdhani Unnayan Kartripakkha to accept Choudhury's payments in August 2019.

On 14 November 2019, the judgment authored by him in the case of Bangladesh Environmental Lawyers Association (BELA) vs Bangladesh and others (Writ Petition No. 8466 of 2017), declared the import, beaching and breaking of the FPSO North Sea Producer illegal and denounced illegalities and lack of transparency in shipbreaking sector in Bangladesh. The Court noted with dismay the incessant violations of national and international laws by the shipbreaking industry, and passed several directions upon the Government to regulate the sector in line with earlier rulings. Referring to the Judgment, NGOs worldwide, including NGO Shipbreaking platform, have urged the UK to hold the ship owners and cash buyers GMS accountable for the illegal export of the toxic ship. The Judgment has paved the way for the UK environmental agency, Department for Environment, Food and Rural Affairs (DEERA) to investigate the illegal export of the toxic ship from the UK.

On 29 January 2020, he delivered the Lex Oration Lecture titled "Digital Footprints: A Rights-Based Perspective" in Dhaka, Bangladesh.

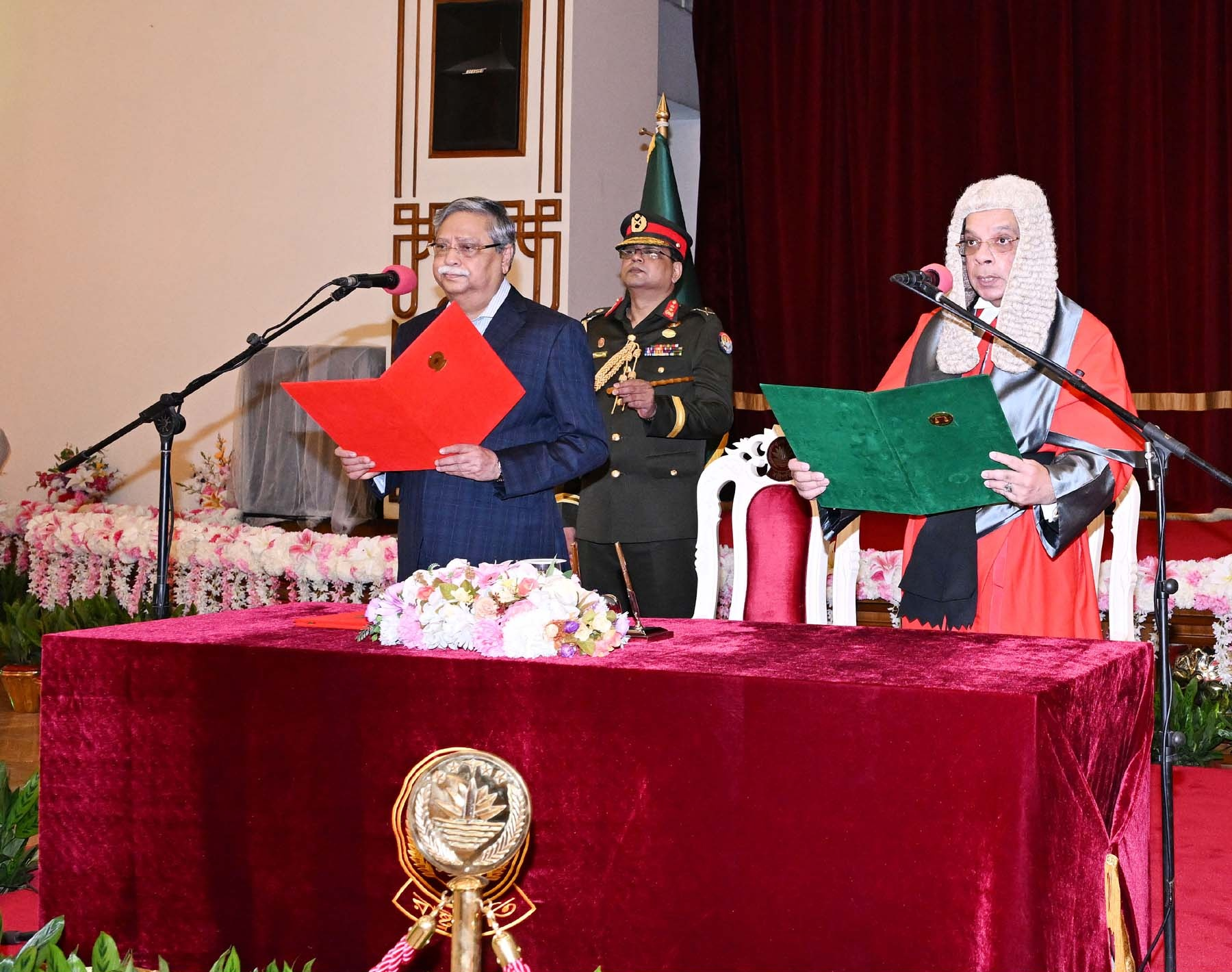
President Mohammed Shahabuddin administered the oath of office to Syed Refat Ahmed as the Chief Justice of Bangladesh at the Durbar Hall of Bangabhaban.

He was appointed the chief justice of Bangladesh by the President of Bangladesh on 10 August 2024. On 11 August 2024, he was sworn in as the chief justice of Bangladesh after his nomination was proposed by student leaders of the Non-cooperation movement (2024).

Refat Ahmed along with the Election Commissioners of Bangladesh in 2024

Sixteenth Amendment of the constitution of Bangladesh, which had transferred the power to remove Supreme Court judges from the Supreme Judicial Council to Parliament, was declared unconstitutional by both High Court Division and Appellate Division of the Supreme Court, though the final Review Petition remained pending. On 20 October 2024, the Appellate Division disposed of the review petition, reinstating the Supreme Judicial Council's authority, which then resumed its functions under the leadership of Justice Ahmed. Since October 2024, the Supreme Judicial Council has been operating at full capacity, actively fulfilling its constitutional mandate to reinforce judicial accountability and integrity.

Justice Ahmed delivered the keynote address at the regional conference "Achieving Just Societies: Inclusive Justice Pathways for People and Planet in Asia and the Pacific" held in Bangkok on 11 November 2024, organised by UNDP, the Thailand Institute of Justice (TIJ), UNEP, and UN Women Asia and the Pacific. Justice Ahmed delivered the main address at the Global Government Summit (Global Government Regulatory Forum) held in Dubai, UAE on 13 February 2025.

At the invitation of the President of the Constitutional Court of Türkiye, Justice Ahmed delivered speech on the occasion of the Court's 63rd anniversary in Istanbul on 25 April 2025. He also presented a comprehensive lecture at NYU Abu Dhabi titled "Climate Justice and the Constitution: Reflections from the Global South" on 28 April 2025.

A high-level delegation led by Justice Ahmed, visited South Africa from 17 to 24 May 2025 to exchange experiences on reform, transition and truth and reconciliation (TRC) process organized by United Nations Development Programme (UNDP) and the Commonwealth Secretariat. During the visit, the Justice Ahmed held a meeting with Justice Mandisa Muriel Lindelwa Maya, the Chief Justice of the Constitutional Court of South Africa.

At the invitation of Justice Antonio Herman Benjamin, Chief Justice of the National High Court of Brazil, Justice Ahmed participated in the program "Exchanges on Matters of Mutual Judicial Interest, Particularly Concerning Institutional Reform, Environmental Justice, Judicial Independence, and Technological Innovation in the Administration of Justice." His visit to Brazil took place from 10 to 19 September 2025.During the visit, Justice Ahmed held meetings with Mr. Fernando Antonio Torres Garcia, President of the Court of Justice of São Paulo (TJSP), as well as with Justice Antonio Herman Benjamin. The discussions focused on a range of issues concerning judicial cooperation between the two jurisdictions.

At the invitation of Justice Boulos Fahmy Iskandar, President of the Supreme Constitutional Court of Egypt, Hon'ble Mr. Justice Ahmed visited the Supreme Constitutional Court of Egypt and the Alexandria Court of Appeal from 5 to 10 October 2025. During the visit, on 7 October 2025, the Supreme Constitutional Court of Egypt and the Supreme Court of Bangladesh signed a Judicial Cooperation Protocol at the Supreme Constitutional Court in Cairo, marking a significant milestone in strengthening bilateral judicial collaboration.

Justice Ahmed held bilateral talks with the Minister of Justice of Thailand, Pol. Lt. Gen. Ruttaphon Naowarat, on 15 October 2025 in Bangkok, during his official visit to attend a UNDP-organized conference titled "Regional Convening on Judicial Leadership for Women Judges in Asia-Pacific". On 16 October 2025, Justice Ahmed delivered the keynote address at the conference, highlighting the importance of advancing gender representation on the Bench as a key driver for achieving sustainable development.

Justice Ahmed has pursued a broad judicial reform agenda focused on strengthening judicial independence, administrative autonomy, and institutional accountability. His tenure has been marked by the introduction of a Judicial Reform Roadmap, emphasizing separation of the judiciary from the executive and modernization of court administration.

A key achievement under his leadership was the establishment of a separate Supreme Court Secretariat, formalized through a government ordinance on 30 November 2025, aimed at ensuring the Supreme Court's administrative, financial, and policy autonomy. He also initiated steps to operationalize constitutionally mandated bodies such as the Judicial Appointment Council and the Supreme Judicial Council, alongside measures to enhance transparency, combat corruption, and expand digital infrastructure within the judiciary.

In support of these reforms, Justice Ahmed conducted roadshows in all divisional cities, participating in seminars and consultations on judicial independence and efficiency, and engaging stakeholders nationwide to build consensus and gather feedback for effective reform implementation.

Justice Ahmed initiated the establishment of dedicated Commercial Courts in Bangladesh. In September 2025, the Supreme Court of Bangladesh submitted a detailed proposal to the Law Ministry for setting up specialized commercial courts to ensure the expeditious resolution of business disputes. The draft ordinance was approved by the Government's Advisory Council in December 2025 and was promulgated on 1 January 2026.

== Bibliography ==
- Ahmed, Syed Refaat (25 October 2023). "Rule of Law within the Constitutional Scheme: A Judicial Perspective" (Part II, Chapter V) in "A History of the Constitution of Bangladesh: The Founding, Development, and Way Ahead" (1st ed.). Routledge. ISBN 9781032233291.
- Ahmed, Syed Refaat (9 July 2019) "The Rohingya Asylum Dilemma: Setting Sights Beyond Protection" (Professor Mahfuza Khanam and Barrister Shafique Ahmed Trust Fund Lecture 2019) Asiatic Society, Dhaka.
- Ahmed, Syed Refaat (16 April 2019) "Politics of Conflicting Allegiances: Bengal, 1937-40) (Professor Dr. Habiba Khatun Trust Fund Lecture 2019) Department of Islamic History and Culture, University of Dhaka
- Ahmed, Syed Refaat (13 October 2018) "Aspirational Value of Law: Test Case on Workers' Rights" (Delivered as the Justice Muhammad Ibrahim Memorial Lecture, 2018 at the Asiatic Society of Bangladesh) 2019 (4) Legal Issue, 42
- Ahmed, Syed Refaat (December, 2016) "The Case of Moulana Abdul Hakim and Judicial Review: A move in the right direction?" Volume 2, Issue 1, University of Asia Pacific Journal of Law & Policy
- Ahmed, Syed Refaat (12 July 2014) "Constitutional Law and Peace Accords: the case of the Chittagong Hill Tracts" (Delivered as the Sarat Chandra Bose 125th Birth Anniversary Lecture, 2014 in Kolkata, India) 2018 (1) Lawyers and Jurists (LNJ), Journal-1
- Ahmed, Syed Refaat (8 June 2010) "CERTIORARI- A Historical and Legal Analysis in a Comparative Perspective" (Delivered as the Keynote Speaker of Justice Ibrahim Memorial Lecture 2010), Justice Muhammad Ibrahim Trust Fund, University of Dhaka
- Ahmed, Syed Refaat (April, 2002) "Of Pariahs and Watchdogs", Volume XXII, P. 9-15, Bangladesh Legal Decisions
- Ahmed, Syed Refaat (December, 2001) "Persecution: The Vietnamese Paradigm" Volume 46, No. 2, Journal of the Asiatic Society of Bangladesh p. 373-386
- Ahmed, Syed Refaat "Forlorn Migrants: An International Legal Regime for Undocumented Migrant Workers" (1st edn.) The University Press Limited, Dhaka. ISBN 978-984-05-1526-4 2000
- Ahmed, Syed Refaat (April, 1990) "The Role of the UN Secretary-General in Resolving the Iran-Iraq Conflict, 1982-1987: Establishing a Case for an Effective Peace-Making Process" Volume 11, No. 2, Bangladesh Institute of International and Strategic Studies Journal, p. 208-241
