= Mirza Ali Ispahani =

Bangladeshi Judge

- মির্জা আলী ইস্পাহানি
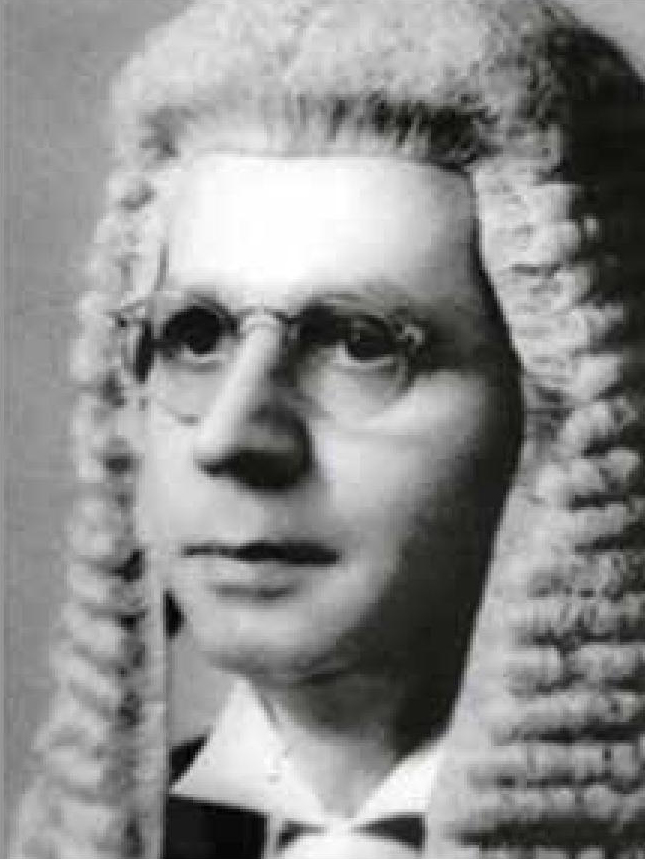
- Justice Ispahani in 1949

Chief Justice Dacca High Court
- In office 1959–1960

Personal details
- Born: 1900 Calcutta, Bengal Presidency, British India
- Died: 1982 (aged 81–82) Dhaka, Bangladesh
- Education: University of Edinburgh
- Profession: Judge

Mirza Ali Ispahani (1900-1982) was the chief justice of East Pakistan. He served as a secretary in the Ministry of Law and later as chief justice of East Pakistan from 1959 to 1962. Ispahani lived in Dhaka's Ispahani Colony, his family estate. He married Monirea Rashti Ispahani and had a son with her, Mirza Shahab Ispahani. He died in 1982 and was buried in Dhaka.

== Early life ==
He was born in 1900 in Calcutta to Hashem Ispahani and Fatimah Ispahani. In 1947, he moved to Dhaka, East Pakistan after the Partition of India along with his cousin Ahmad Ispahani. He graduated with a law degree from University of Edinburgh and joined the Inner Temple.

== Career ==
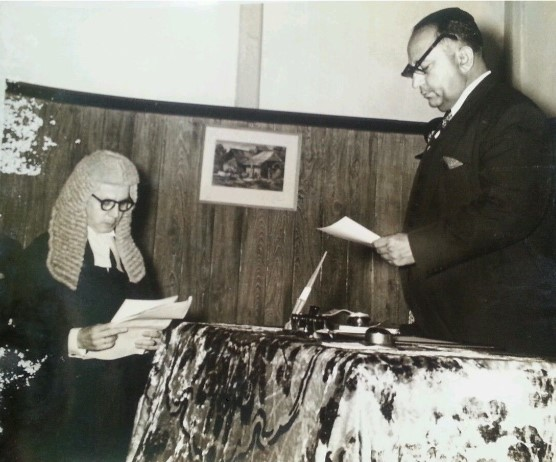
Chief Justice Ispahani administers the oath of Governor to Lt General Azam Khan, 1960

Ispahani practiced at the Calcutta High Court from 1928 to 1937. He was then appointed a district and sessions judge.

Ispahani was a former president of Dhaka Club Limited.

In 1960, Justice Imam Hossain Choudhury succeeded Justice Isphani as the chief justice of East Pakistan.

== Death ==
Ispahani died in 1982 and was buried in Dhaka.
