= A. B. M. Khairul Haque =

19th Chief Justice of Bangladesh

- এ. বি. এম. খায়রুল হক

19th Chief Justice of Bangladesh
- In office 1 October 2010 – 17 May 2011
- Appointed by: Zillur Rahman
- Prime Minister: Sheikh Hasina
- Preceded by: Mohammad Fazlul Karim
- Succeeded by: Md. Muzammel Hossain

Personal details
- Born: 18 May 1944 (age 82)
- Education: University of Dhaka

A. B. M. Khairul Haque (born 18 May 1944) is a Bangladeshi jurist, who served as the 19th Chief Justice of Bangladesh and the chairman of Bangladesh Law Commission.

== Career ==
In June 2008, Khairul Haque and Justice Md Abu Tariq held hearings on suo moto contempt rule against Ekramul Huq and other journalists after a magazine published a report on a High Court judge whitening black money. Justice Khairul Haque and Justice Abu Tariq declared Contempt of Court Ordinance, 2008 illegal due to provision allowing "constructive criticism" of judgement.

Haque delivered the verdict which declared the Caretaker Government illegal and unconstitutional.

Haque was made Chairman of Law Commission on 23 June 2013 for a term of three years. He called for trial of Pakistani soldiers for war crimes committed during Bangladesh Liberation War.

On 24 July 2025, Haque was arrested in Dhanmondi, Dhaka. He was accused in the murder case of Abdul Kaiyum, an activist of the Bangladesh Nationalist Party affiliate Jubo Dal. Kaiyum died in protests led by the Anti-Discrimination Student Movement against former Prime Minister Sheikh Hasina on 18 July 2024. Journalist David Bergman criticized his arrest saying "To use a judicial decision as a pretext for a criminal case—let alone a murder charge to which he has no connection—is also a direct assault on the principle of judicial independence and the rule of law." Bergman believed Haque was targeted for his 2011 decision that abolished the caretaker government.

Haque was granted bail in March 2026 in 2 cases and cleared for release from jail. On 17 August, an Appellate Division's chamber judge upheld a High Court order granting Haque ad-interim bail and he was then released from Keraniganj Central Jail the day after.

== Leading Judgments ==
- Abdul Mannan Khan v Government of Bangladesh (declaring caretaker government unconstitutional)
- Siddiq Ahmed v Bangladesh
- Bangladesh Italian Marble Works v Government of Bangladesh
