= Constitutional ruling =

A constitutional ruling is a legal case in the United States in which the United States Supreme Court interprets the Constitution of the United States and makes a ruling that binds all states. It is contrasted with a common law case which sets precedent in federal cases, but is not binding in state cases.
