= Md. Ruhul Quddus =

Bangladeshi judge

The Honourable Md. Ruhul Quddus
- মোঃ রুহুল কুদ্দুস

Justice of the High Court Division of Bangladesh
- Incumbent
- Assumed office 5 November 2010

Personal details
- Born: 7 December 1962 (age 63)
- Education: University of Rajshahi
- Profession: Judge

Md. Ruhul Quddus (born 7 December 1962) is a Bangladeshi justice of the High Court Division of the Supreme Court of Bangladesh.

== Early life ==
Ruhul Quddus was born on 7 December 1962.

== Career ==
Ruhul Quddus completed his B.A. LL.B. and M.S.S. at University of Rajshahi. He was elected the General Secretary of the Rajshahi University Central Students Union. A case of murder was filed against him and others in November 1988 on the charge of killing a leader of the Islami Chhatra Shibir, the student wing of Islamist political party Bangladesh Jamaat-e-Islami, at the university.

Ruhul Quddus started working as a lawyer on 19 April 1993 and became a member of the Bangladesh Bar Council. On 29 September 1996, he became a lawyer of the High Court Division of Bangladesh Supreme Court.

On 15 January 2009, Ruhul Quddus became a lawyer of the Appellate Division of Bangladesh Supreme Court. He served as an advisor to Bangladesh Legal Aid and Services Trust and Board of Intermediate and Secondary Education, Rajshahi.

In April 2010, the government sought to remove Ruhul Quddus from among those accused in the murder case, and appointed him an Additional Judge to the High Court Division. In an unprecedented move, Chief Justice Mohammad Fazlul Karim declined to swear him in. Four months later, Ruhul Quddus was dropped from the murder case. Despite protests along party lines against Ruhul Quddus' appointment, citing his "controversial past", the next Chief Justice, A.B.M. Khairul Haque, administered the oath of office to him in November.

Ruhul Quddus was appointed Judge to the High Court Division in October 2012.
