= BNS Shaheed Ruhul Amin =

Two ships of the Bangladesh Navy carried the name BNS Shaheed Ruhul Amin:

- BNS Shaheed Ruhul Amin (1974), an ex-Canadian coastal passenger-cargo vessel named Anticosti acquired in 1974.
- BNS Shaheed Ruhul Amin (1994), an Island-class patrol craft currently in service. Used as a training ship.
