= Surendra Kumar Sinha =

21st Chief Justice of Bangladesh

- সুরেন্দ্র কুমার সিনহা
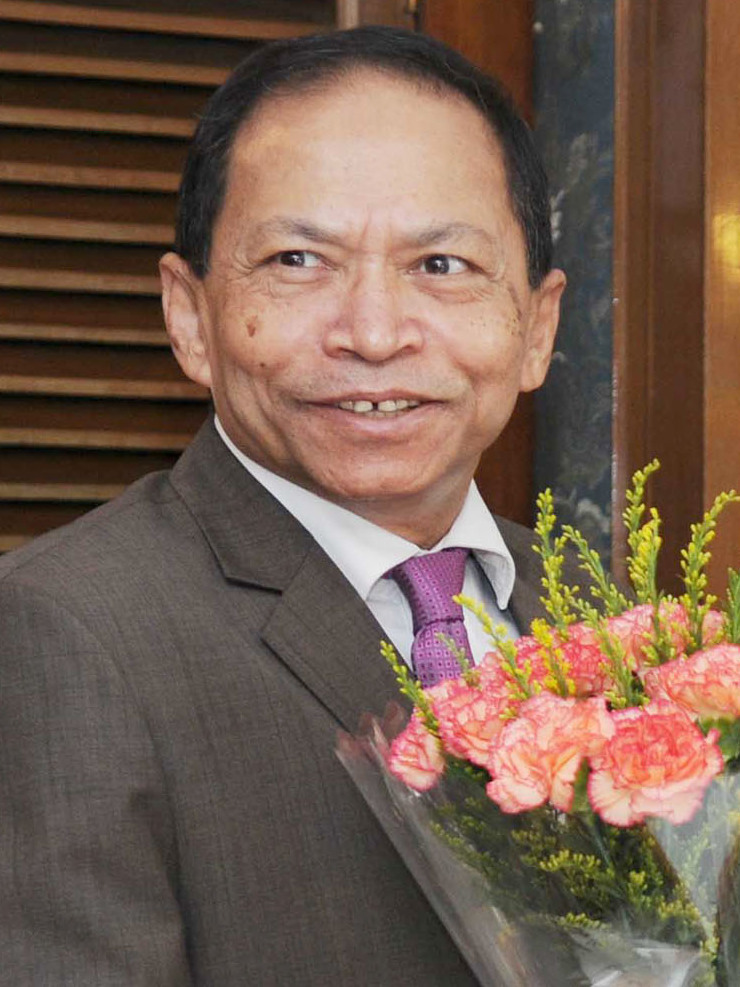
- Sinha in New Delhi (2015)

21st Chief Justice of Bangladesh
- In office 17 January 2015 – 11 November 2017
- Appointed by: Mohammad Abdul Hamid (President of Bangladesh)
- Preceded by: Md. Muzammel Hossain
- Succeeded by: Syed Mahmud Hossain

Personal details
- Born: 1 February 1951 (age 75) Sylhet, East Bengal, Dominion of Pakistan (now Bangladesh)
- Spouse: Sushama Sinha
- Education: University of Chittagong

Surendra Kumar Sinha (born 1 February 1951), commonly known as SK Sinha is a Bangladeshi lawyer and jurist who served as the 21st Chief Justice of Bangladesh. He resigned from the position in November 2017 amid the 16th amendment verdict controversy.

== Early life and education ==
He completed bachelor in economics from Chittagong University. Later he obtained his bachelor of laws (LL.B) degree in 1974 under the University of Chittagong.

== Career ==
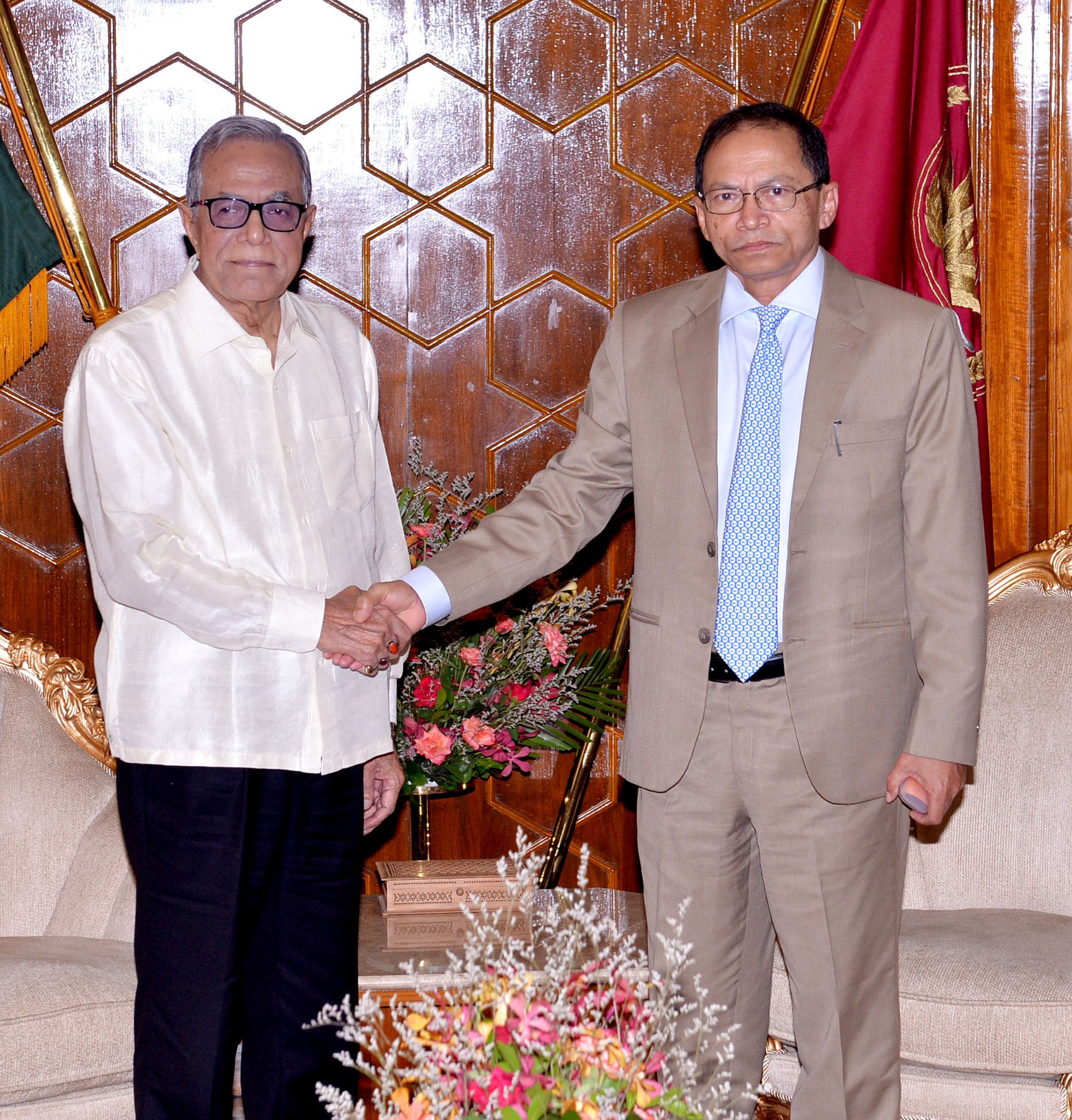
Chief Justice Surendra Kumar Sinha meets President Abdul Hamid in 2015

Sinha enrolled as an advocate of the District Court, Sylhet in 1974 and practiced in that court under the guidance of two civil and criminal lawyers and conducted sessions trial cases independently till the end of 1977. He obtained the permission to practice before the High Court Division and Appellate Division of the Supreme Court of Bangladesh in 1978 and 1990 respectively.

Sinha was elevated as a judge of the High Court Division on 24 October 1999. On 16 July 2009 he was appointed judge of the appellate division of the Supreme Court of Bangladesh. He assumed the office of the chairman of the Bangladesh Judicial Service Commission in June 2011 and the office of the Chief Justice of Bangladesh on 17 January 2015. As a Hindu, he was the first non-Muslim chief justice of the Muslim-majority country.

Sinha attended several conferences regarding judicial affairs.

Sinha is known for a number of high-profile judgments including those on the killing of former President Sheikh Mujibur Rahman and the 5th and 13th amendments to the Constitution of Bangladesh.

=== The 16th amendment verdict ===
The 16th amendment of the constitution of Bangladesh was passed by the parliament on 17 September 2014 which would give power to Jatiya Sangsad to remove judges if allegations of incapability or misconduct against them are proved. On 5 May 2016, a special High Court bench declared the amendment illegal and unconstitutional. On 4 January 2017, the government challenged the verdict by filing an appeal with the appellate division and on 3 July, a seven-member Supreme Court bench headed by Sinha unanimously rejected the appeal upholding the High Court verdict. Following the full verdict release on 1 August, the prime minister and senior ministers publicly criticized Sinha for the decision. The Jatiya Sangsad on September 13 passed a resolution calling for legal steps to nullify the Supreme Court verdict.

=== Fallout ===
Sinha went on one month's leave since 3 October 2017 and traveled to Australia on 13 October. Justice Md. Abdul Wahhab Miah was appointed to discharge the duties of the chief justice in the absence of Sinha. Earlier, law minister Anisul Huq said Sinha went on the leave for treatment as he was suffering from cancer. Sinha later rejected this claim. Bangladesh Nationalist Party spokesperson alleged Sinha was forced to leave.

On 14 October, a day after Sinha left the country, the Supreme Court released a statement citing 11 charges against him including money laundering, financial irregularities, corruption and moral turpitude. According to the statement, on 30 September, President Mohammad Abdul Hamid handed over documentary evidence over those allegations to four other appellate division justices. It added, upon meeting with those justices, Sinha submitted his application to the president on 2 October for one month's leave. On 10 November, he flew to Canada when his 39-day leave expired. A day later, he sent his resignation letter to President Hamid. Sinha was scheduled to retire on 31 January 2018.

On 10 July 2019, the Anti-Corruption Commission sued Sinha and 10 others on the charge of misappropriating and laundering about Tk 4 crore from the Farmers Bank in 2016. A day later, Sinha rejected the allegations against him but said he would not defend himself in court, he had committed no wrong and that Sheikh Hasina’s government had been misusing the law. According to a Canadian online news portal, The Star, Sinha crossed into Canada through Fort Erie from the United States on 4 July and filed a refugee claim.

On 6 January 2020, Judge KM Emrul Kayesh of the Senior Special Judge’s Court of Dhaka issued arrest warrants against Sinha and 10 others as they have been shown fugitives in the charge-sheets.

On 31 March 2022, ACC filed a case against Sinha and his brother, Ananta Kumar Sinha, over allegations of illegal earning and money laundering of $280,000.

== Later Development ==
"My last days in Bangladesh were very appalling, which cannot be expressed in words. Because it is a question of realisation. I, as a sitting chief justice, had been kept under house arrest. I was not allowed to communicate with anybody. My internet connections were disconnected. Nobody was allowed to meet me. Security forces [intelligence] would stand guard around my home. One of my staffers was beaten up while he was entering my house. Saiful Abedin, the then chief of DGFI, used to disturb me at midnight and put pressure on me to resign and leave the country."

— Surendra Kumar Sinha

In a 14 August 2024 interview with The Daily Star, following the fall of the Hasina government, Sinha recounted the intense pressure he faced from then Prime Minister Sheikh Hasina. Sinha claimed that Hasina, using DGFI personnel, forced him to leave the country due to his efforts to uphold judicial independence despite her interference. He noted that tensions began when he initiated measures to prevent lower courts from granting bail to notorious criminals shortly after his appointment as the 21st Chief Justice of Bangladesh in January 2015.

The conflict escalated when he directed the law ministry to draft disciplinary rules for lower court judges, ensuring that the Supreme Court retained authority rather than the executive branch. The situation further intensified when he refused to rule in favor of the government in the 16th amendment case, which concerned the removal of Supreme Court judges, in July 2017.

Sinha stated that his colleagues in the Appellate Division of the Supreme Court, under government influence, refused to sit with him in court. They also informed him that the High Court judges would not cooperate with him, subjecting him to immense mental pressure.

He recounted that on the night of July 2, he was summoned to Bangabhaban for a meeting with then-President Abdul Hamid, Prime Minister Sheikh Hasina, Law Minister Anisul Huq, and Attorney General Mahbubey Alam. During the meeting, Hasina requested that he deliver the verdict in favor of the government the next day, July 3. However, he declined, prioritizing the independence of the judiciary.

"I could figure that the prime minister perhaps convinced the other judges of the apex court bench to deliver judgement in favour of the government. At one stage, the arguments with the prime minister heated up and I told her that I would resign right away. At that, she requested me not to resign and said the people would take it very badly if I resigned. She told me to go ahead as I wished."

— Surendra Kumar Sinha

Sinha stated that after all seven judges of the Appellate Division unanimously delivered the verdict on July 3, 2017, which scrapped the 16th amendment, members of the ruling party, including Prime Minister Hasina, harshly criticized him for over five hours.

Sinha added an incident where, after a day at the Supreme Court, the DGFI chief visited his office, claiming that the prime minister had sent him to demand his resignation and departure from the country. Justice Sinha recalled shouting at the DGFI chief, questioning his authority, and was told that they only follow the prime minister's orders, not those of the law minister or attorney general. He asked the DGFI chief to leave, but upon returning home, he was placed under house arrest.

The Supreme Court's registrar general informed him that they could do nothing and advised him to take leave. Distressed, Justice Sinha signed a seven-day leave application prepared by his secretary. When he arrived home that evening, he found his residence completely secured by military personnel in plainclothes, with all gates closed and internet connections disconnected.

"Then I thought the government might not allow me to stay in the country. I hurriedly completed other relevant proceedings. I went to Japan to join a conference of the chief justices of the Asia Pacific countries. After getting out of the conference room, I got a phone call from DGFI and was told not to return home. A day later, I came back to Bangladesh through Singapore. After I landed at Dhaka airport, I discovered that five to six DGFI members surrounded me. They were not allowing me to go to my officials present there. A tall man told me that they wanted to have a cup of coffee with me and requested me to give them five minutes. I asked them to mind their language and maintain the protocol. Incensed, I said 'get lost'. They wanted to go with me in my car on the pretext of ensuring my security. I told them that I have a car and security and I don't need them and left. I thought it was another bad signal.

— Surendra Kumar Sinha

The following morning, as he worked from his residential office, Justice Md Abdul Wahhab Miah called, requesting to meet him. Although Sinha asked Wahhab to come to his house, Wahhab insisted that he go to his residence, where other judges were present. Sensing a conspiracy, Justice Sinha invited them to his home instead. When they arrived, they informed him they would not sit with him in court, a decision Sinha recognized as being influenced by the government, further isolating him and undermining his position.

Amid this situation, Justice Sinha left Bangladesh on the night of October 13, 2017.

== Personal life ==
Sinha is married to Sushama Sinha. He sought asylum in USA, but was denied then he crossed the border to Canada and sought asylum there.

== Biography ==
Sinha published his autobiography A Broken Dream: Rule of Law, Human Rights and Democracy on 19 September 2018. In the book, he gave first-hand accounts of government agencies intimidating the judges to serve verdicts in favour of the government, ruled by Awami League. In a sensational revelation, he alleged that the country's military intelligence agency Directorate General of Forces Intelligence (DGFI), forced him to leave the country and offer the resignation. DGFI spokesperson Brigadier general Tanveer Mazhar Siddique, later denied the allegation saying, "DGFI never threatens any person or does anything like this".
