= Syed A. B. Mahmud Hossain =

Chief Justice of Bangladesh from 1975 to 1978

Honorable Chief Justice Syed A. B. Mahmud Hossain

2nd Chief Justice of Bangladesh
- In office 18 November 1975 – 31 January 1978
- Appointed by: Abu Sadat Mohammad Sayem
- President: Abu Sadat Mohammad Sayem; Ziaur Rahman
- Preceded by: Abu Sadat Mohammad Sayem
- Succeeded by: Kemaluddin Hossain

Personal details
- Born: 1916 Laskarpur Union, Habiganj, Sylhet, Bengal Presidency, British India
- Died: 2 August 1981 (aged 64–65) Dhaka, Bangladesh

Syed Abul Bashar Mahmud Hossain (1916 – 2 August 1981) was a Bangladeshi lawyer and jurist who served as the 2nd Chief Justice of Bangladesh during 1975–1978.

== Early life and career ==
Hossain was born into a Bengali Muslim family of Syeds in Laskarpur Union in Habiganj district in 1916. He was a descendant of Syed Nasiruddin, a general of the Sultan Shamsuddin Firuz Shah who helped conquer Sylhet. He joined the Dhaka District Bar in 1940. He served as the principal of Darul Ulum Ahsania Madrasa, Dhaka. He joined the Dhaka High Court Bar in 1948. He served as the assistant government pleader from 1952 to 1956 in the High Court of East Pakistan. He was the advocate general of East Pakistan in 1964. He was then elevated to the High Court Division on 18 January 1972.

In the context of the retirement of Justice Abu Sadat Mohammad Sayem, the honorable President of Bangladesh appointed Syed A. B. Mahmud Hossain as Chief Justice and on 18 November 1975, he took the oath as Chief Justice. On 31 January 1978, he retired from the post after President Ziaur Rahman reduced the retirement age of judges from 65 to 62.

== Personal life and death ==
Husain died on 2 August 1981 in Dhaka. His son, Syed Md. Dastgir Husain, is a retired Judge of the High Court Division of the Supreme Court of Bangladesh. His daughter married the renowned eye surgeon from Phulbari, Sylhet, Prof. M. A. Rahim Choudhury, with whom he shared literary interests. Husain translated into Bengali and English the Diwan-e-Gausia, a collection of Persian poems attributed to Abdul Qadir Jilani.
