= Moulvi Ruhul Amin =

Pakistani politician

Moulvi Ruhul Amin was a Member of the 4th National Assembly of Pakistan as a representative of East Pakistan.

== Career ==
Amin was a Member of the 4th National Assembly of Pakistan representing Noakhali-II. He was nominated by the Muslim League.
