= Ruhul Amin (Bangladeshi film director) =

Bangladeshi film director

- Born: 14 March 1940
- Died: 7 January 2013 (aged 72)
- Occupation: Film Director

Ruhul Amin (14 March 1940 – 7 January 2013) was a Bangladeshi film director.

== Biography ==
Amin was born on 14 March 1940 in Dhaka. His ancestors' home is situated at Pubail in Gazipur, Uttar Pradesh, India.

The first film Amin directed, Nijere Haraye Khuji, was released in 1972. He also directed films like Gangchil and Beiman, which were selected for preservation in the Bangladesh Film Archive.

Amin died in his own house in Moinartek, Dhaka on 7 January 2013 at the age of 72.

== Selected filmography ==
- Nijere Haraye Khuji
- Gangchil
- Beiman
- Rong Berong
- Target
