= KM Sobhan =

Bangladeshi Judge

- Born: 25 July 1924; Faridpur District, Bengal Presidency, British India
- Died: 31 December 2007 (aged 83); Dhaka, Bangladesh
- Resting place: Mirpur, Dhaka, Bangladesh
- Occupation: justice

Kazi Mohammad Sobhan (25 July 1924 – 31 December 2007) was a Bangladeshi justice, diplomat and activist. He was a former justice of the Bangladesh Supreme Court. He also served as the Bangladeshi ambassador to Germany and Czechoslovakia.

== Career ==
Sobhan was appointed as a judge in 1971.

Sobhan had two sons, Kazi Adnan Sobhan and Kazi Rehan Sobhan and a daughter, Rumana Nahid Sobhan. On 31 December 2007, Sobhan fell sick while walking at Ramna Park and later died of cardiac arrest at Birdem Hospital in Dhaka. He was buried in Mirpur Martyred Intellectuals' Graveyard.
