= Law Commission of Bangladesh =

- Formation: 1996
- Headquarters: Dhaka, Bangladesh
- Region served: Bangladesh
- Official language: Bengali
- Website: Law Commission of Bangladesh

The Law Commission of Bangladesh is an independent body, set up through an act passed in the national parliament that reviews laws and recommends reforms when necessary in Bangladesh and is located in Dhaka, Bangladesh. Former Appellate Division Justice Zinat Ara is the present chairman of the commission.

== History ==
There has a number of temporary law commissions in the history of Bangladesh, the first one being set up in 1974. On 9 September 1996 the first permanent law commission was constituted. The first chairman of the commission was Fazle Kaderi Mohammad Abdul Munim, a former chief justice of Bangladesh. In 2016 it drafted the Liberation War Denial Crimes Act, 2016 which made denying war crimes in the Bangladesh Liberation war a crime.
