= M. M. Ruhul Amin =

Bangladeshi jurist

- এম. এম. রুহুল আমিন

16th Chief Justice of Bangladesh
- In office 1 June 2008 – 22 December 2009
- Appointed by: Iajuddin Ahmed
- President: Iajuddin Ahmed; Zillur Rahman
- Prime Minister: Fakhruddin Ahmed (acting); Sheikh Hasina
- Preceded by: Md. Ruhul Amin
- Succeeded by: Md. Tafazzul Islam

Personal details
- Born: 23 December 1942 Lakshmipur District, Bengal Presidency, British India
- Died: 17 January 2017 (aged 74) Bukit Merah, Singapore
- Education: BA (honours), MA, LL.B
- Alma mater: University of Dhaka

M. M. Ruhul Amin (23 December 1942 – 17 January 2017) was a Bangladeshi jurist who served as the 16th Chief Justice of Bangladesh.

== Education ==
Ruhul Amin earned his bachelor and master's in history and LL.B from the University of Dhaka.

== Career ==
Ruhul Amin joined the judicial service in 1967 and became a district judge in 1984. He worked as a district and sessions judge in four districts. He was appointed an additional judge of the High Court on 10 February 1994. He was elevated as a judge of the Appellate Division on 13 July 2003. He had been serving as the chairman of Bangladesh Judicial Service Commission since 2004.

On 1 June 2008, Ruhul Amin was appointed the 16th Chief Justice of Bangladesh by President Iajuddin Ahmed.

Ruhul Amin died on 17 January 2017, while undergoing treatment at Singapore General Hospital.
