= Amendments to the Constitution of Bangladesh =

Amendments to the Constitution of Bangladesh involve making changes to the country's supreme law. The Constitution of the People's Republic of Bangladesh was adopted by the Constituent Assembly on 4 November 1972 and came into effect on 16 December 1972, one year after Bangladesh's victory in the War of Liberation. As of 2018, the Constitution has been amended 17 times. The procedure for constitutional amendments is outlined in Article 142, which mandates that a bill must be presented in the Jatiya Sangsad with the support of no less than two-thirds of all its members (233 MPs).

== Amendments ==
=== First amendment ===
Passed on 15 July 1973, the first amendment was made to Article 47 of the constitution. The amendment inserted an additional clause, Article 47(3), that states that any law regarding prosecution or punishment of war crimes cannot be declared void or unlawful on grounds of unconstitutionality. A new Article 47A was also added, which specifies that certain fundamental rights will be inapplicable in such cases.

=== Second amendment ===
The second amendment of the constitution was passed on 22 September 1973. It suspended the enforcement of some of the fundamental rights of the citizens during a state of emergency. The act made following changes to the constitution:

- Amended Articles 26, 63, 72 and 142.
- Substituted Article 33.
- Inserted a new Part IXA to the constitution.

=== Third amendment ===
Third Amendment was passed on 28 November 1974 that brought changes in Article 2 of the constitution. An agreement was made between Bangladesh and India in respect of exchange of certain enclaves and fixation of boundary lines between the countries.

=== Fourth amendment ===
The amendment was passed on 25 January 1975.

1. Amended articles 11, 66, 67, 72, 74, 76, 80, 88, 95, 98, 109, 116, 117, 119, 122, 123, 141A, 147 and 148 of the constitution.
2. Substituted Articles 44, 70, 102, 115 and 124 of the constitution.
3. Amended part III of the constitution out of existence.
4. Altered the Third and Fourth Schedule.
5. Extended the term of the first Jatiya Sangsad.
6. Inserted a new part, VIA in the constitution and.
7. Inserted new articles 73A and 116A in the constitution.

Significant changes included:

- the presidential form of government was introduced replacing the parliamentary system.
- a one-party system in place of a multi-party system was introduced;
- the powers of the Jatiya Sangsad were curtailed;
- the Judiciary lost much of its independence;
- the Supreme Court was deprived of its jurisdiction over the protection and enforcement of fundamental rights.

=== Fifth Amendment ===
The Fifth Amendment Act was passed by the Jatiya Sangsad on 6 April 1979. This Act amended the Fourth Schedule to the constitution by adding a new paragraph 18 thereto, which provided that all amendments, additions, modifications, substitutions and omissions made in the constitution during the period between 15 August 1975 and 9 April 1979 (both days inclusive) by any Proclamation or Proclamation Order of the Martial Law Authorities had been validly made and would not be called in question in or before any court or tribunal or authority on any ground whatsoever.

=== Sixth Amendment ===
This Amendment Act was passed on 10 July 1981. The Sixth Amendment Act was enacted by the Jatiya Sangsad with a view to amending Articles 51 and 66 of the 1981 constitution.

=== Seventh Amendment ===
The Seventh Amendment Act was passed on 11 November 1986. It amended Article 96 of the constitution; it also amended the Fourth Schedule to the constitution by inserting a new paragraph 19 thereto, providing among others that all proclamations, proclamation orders, Chief Martial Law Administrator's Orders, Martial Law Regulations, Martial Law Orders, Martial Law Instructions, ordinances and other laws made during the period between 24 March 1982 and 11 November 1986 (both days inclusive) had been validly made, and would not be called in question in or before any court or tribunal or authority on any ground whatsoever. In summary, the amendment protected Hussain Muhammad Ershad and his regime from prosecution for actions taken under the years of military rule, following the 1982 coup d'état until the 1986 presidential election.

=== Eighth Amendment ===
This Amendment Act was passed on 9 June 1988. The Constitution (Eighth Amendment) Act, 1988 declared, among others, that Islam shall be state religion (Article 2A) and also decentralised the judiciary by setting up six permanent benches of the High Court Division outside Dhaka (Article 100). Anwar Hussain vs. Bangladesh, widely known as the 8th Amendment case, is a famous judgment in the constitutional history of independent Bangladesh.

=== Ninth Amendment ===
This Amendment Act was passed on 11 July 1989.

=== Twelfth Amendment ===
The Twelfth Amendment Act was passed on 18 September 1991, following a constitutional referendum. It amended Articles 48, 55, 56, 57, 58, 59, 60, 70, 72, 109, 119, 123(1) and (2) 124, 141A and 142, restoring executive powers to the Prime Minister's Office, as per the original 1972 constitution, but which had been held by the President's Office since 1974. Instead, the President became the constitutional head of the state; the Prime Minister became the executive head; the cabinet headed by the Prime Minister became responsible to the Jatiya Sangsad; the post of the Vice President was abolished and the President was required to be elected by the members of the Jatiya Sangsad. Moreover, through Article 59 of the Constitution, this Act ensured the participation of the people's representatives in local government bodies.

=== Thirteenth Amendment ===
The Constitution (Thirteenth Amendment) Act, 1996 (28 March) introduced a non-party Caretaker Government (CtG) system which, acting as an interim government, would give all possible aid and assistance to the Election Commission for holding the general election. It was declared illegal on 10 May 2011 by the Appellate Division of the Supreme Court. Though High Court declared it legal previously on 4 August 2004.

=== Fourteenth Amendment ===
The Fourteenth Amendment was passed on 17 May 2004.The main provision for this amendment is concerned about women in parliament.

=== Fifteenth amendment ===
The Fifteenth Amendment was passed on 30 June 2011, making some significant changes to the constitution. The amendment made following changes to the constitution:

- Increased number of women reserve seats to 50 from existing 45.
- After article 7 it inserted articles 7(a) and 7(b) in a bid to end take over of power through extra-constitutional means.
- Restored secularism in its original form.
- Incorporated nationalism, socialism, democracy and secularism as the fundamental principles of the state policy.
- Acknowledged Sheikh Mujibur Rahman as the Father of the Nation.

On 17 December 2024, it was declared partially illegal by the High Court Division of Supreme Court of Bangladesh, restoring the caretaker government and provision for referendums for constitutional amendments.

=== Sixteenth amendment ===
The 16th amendment of the constitution was passed by the parliament on 22 September 2014, which gave power to the Jatiya Sangsad to remove judges if allegations of incapability or misconduct against them are proved. It was a controversial amendment to control the judicial system of the country by the parliament members. On 5 May 2016, the Supreme Court of Bangladesh declared the 16th Amendment illegal and contradictory to the Constitution. The Appellate Division also upheld the verdict. After hearing the review petition on 20 October 2024, the Appellate Division upheld the previous Sixteenth Amendment verdict.

=== Seventeenth Amendment ===
The 17th amendment of the constitution was passed by the Jatiya Sangsad on 8 July 2018. The amendment extended the tenure of the 50 reserved seats for women for another 25 years.
