= Md. Ruhul Amin =

Bangladeshi judge (1941–2024)

- মোঃ রুহুল আমিন

15th Chief Justice of Bangladesh
- In office 1 March 2007 – 31 May 2008
- Appointed by: Iajuddin Ahmed
- President: Iajuddin Ahmed
- Prime Minister: Fakhruddin Ahmed
- Preceded by: J. R. Mudassir Husain
- Succeeded by: M M Ruhul Amin

Personal details
- Born: 1 June 1941 Noakhali District, Chittagong Division, Bengal Province, British India
- Died: 24 November 2024 (aged 83) Dhaka, Bangladesh

Md. Ruhul Amin (1 June 1941 – 24 November 2024) was a Bangladeshi jurist who served as the 15th Chief Justice of Bangladesh from 1 March 2007 until 31 May 2008. Ruhul Amin died on 24 November 2024, at the age of 83.
