= Chief Justice of Bangladesh =

Chief amongst the judges of the Supreme Court of Bangladesh

- বাংলাদেশের প্রধান বিচারপতি
- Emblem of the chief justice of Bangladesh

- Flag of the chief justice of Bangladesh

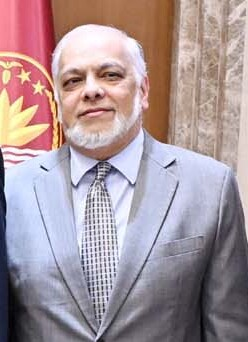
- Incumbent; Zubayer Rahman Chowdhury since 28 December 2025
- Supreme Court of Bangladesh
- Style: The Honourable (formal); Mr. Chief Justice (informal); His Excellency (diplomatic)
- Type: Chief Justice
- Status: Presiding Judge
- Abbreviation: CJB
- Member of: Judiciary of Bangladesh
- Residence: Dhaka, Bangladesh
- Seat: Supreme Court of Bangladesh, Shahbag, Dhaka
- Appointer: The president of Bangladesh
- Term length: Until the age of 67 or at the pleasure of the president
- Inaugural holder: Abu Sadat Mohammad Sayem
- Formation: 16 December 1972; 53 years ago
- Website: supremecourt.gov.bd

The chief justice of Bangladesh (Bengali: বাংলাদেশের প্রধান বিচারপতি – Baṅladeśer Prodhan Bicarpoti) is the highest-ranking judge of the Supreme Court of Bangladesh and the head of the country's judiciary, overseeing both the Supreme Court and all subordinate courts. The chief justice is appointed by the president of Bangladesh. The chief justice sits in the Appellate Division of the Supreme Court with other judges to hear and decide cases, presides over meetings of the full Supreme Court to transact business relating to administration of the court, and supervises the discipline of the judges and magistrates of the subordinate courts. Most rules for regulating the practice and procedure of both the Appellate and High Court Divisions of the Supreme Court—including those applicable to subordinate courts and specified in legislative acts such as the Companies Act 1994 and the Banking Companies Act 1991—are duly scrutinized and approved in full court meetings presided over by the chief justice. He also distributes judicial business of the High Court Division by constituting different benches to exercise its original, appellate and revisable jurisdictions.

Administrative control—including the power to create posts, grant promotion and approve leave—and disciplinary authority over judges and magistrates of the subordinate courts are exercised by the president in consultation with the Supreme Court. Urgent matters in this regard are dealt with in consultation with the chief justice.

== Appointment procedure ==
Clause (3) of Article 48 of the Constitution of Bangladesh states: "Except for the appointment of the Prime Minister under clause (3) of Article 56 and the Chief Justice under clause (1) of Article 95 of this Constitution, the President shall perform all other functions in accordance with the advice of the Prime Minister"; and under the power granted by Article 95(1), the Honourable President of Bangladesh appoints the Chief Justice. Moreover, under Article 96(1) of the Constitution, a judge may serve up to the age of 67.

== List of chief justices of Bangladesh ==
No.	Image	Name (birth–death)	Start of Term	End of Term	Length of Term	Appointed by (President of Bangladesh)	Ref.
1		Abu Sadat Mohammad Sayem (1916 – 1997)	16 December 1972	5 November 1975	2 years, 324 days	Abu Sayeed Chowdhury	
2		Syed A. B. Mahmud Hossain (1916 – 1981)	18 November 1975	31 January 1978	2 years, 74 days	Abu Sadat Mohammad Sayem	
3		Kemaluddin Hossain (1923 - 2013)	1 February 1978	11 April 1982	4 years, 69 days	Ziaur Rahman	
4		Fazle Kaderi Mohammad Abdul Munim (1924 – 2001)	12 April 1982	30 November 1989	7 years, 232 days	Ahsanuddin Chowdhury	
5		Badrul Haider Chowdhury (1925 – 1998)	1 December 1989	1 January 1990	31 days	Hussain Muhammad Ershad	
6		Shahabuddin Ahmed (1930 – 2022)	14 January 1990	31 January 1995	5 years, 17 days	Hussain Muhammad Ershad	
7		Muhammad Habibur Rahman (1928 – 2014)	1 February 1995	30 April 1995	88 days	Abdur Rahman Biswas	
8		Abu Taher Mohammad Afzal (born 1934)	1 May 1995	31 May 1999	4 years, 30 days	Abdur Rahman Biswas	
9		Mustafa Kamal (1933 – 2015)	1 June 1999	31 December 1999	213 days	Shahabuddin Ahmed	
10		Latifur Rahman (1936 – 2017)	1 January 2000	28 February 2001	1 year, 58 days	Shahabuddin Ahmed	
11		Mahmudul Amin Choudhury (1937 – 2019)	1 March 2001	17 June 2002	1 year, 108 days	Shahabuddin Ahmed	
12		Mainur Reza Chowdhury (1938 – 2004)	18 June 2002	22 June 2003	1 year, 4 days	Badruddoza Chowdhury	
13		Khondokar Mahmud Hasan (born 1939)	23 June 2003	26 January 2004	217 days	Iajuddin Ahmed	
14		Syed Jillur Rahim Mudasser Husain (born 1940)	27 January 2004	28 February 2007	3 years, 32 days	Iajuddin Ahmed	
15		Md. Ruhul Amin (1941 – 2024)	1 March 2007	31 May 2008	1 year, 91 days	Iajuddin Ahmed	
16		M M Ruhul Amin (1942 – 2017)	1 June 2008	22 December 2009	1 year, 204 days	Iajuddin Ahmed	
17		Md. Tafazzul Islam (born 1943)	23 December 2009	7 February 2010	46 days	Zillur Rahman	
18		Mohammad Fazlul Karim (1943 – 2024)	8 February 2010	30 September 2010	234 days	Zillur Rahman	
19		A.B.M. Khairul Haque (born 1944)	1 October 2010	17 May 2011	228 days	Zillur Rahman	
20		Md. Muzammel Hossain (born 1948)	18 May 2011	16 January 2015	3 years, 243 days	Zillur Rahman	
21		Surendra Kumar Sinha (born 1951)	17 January 2015	11 November 2017 (Resigned)	2 years, 298 days	Abdul Hamid	
Acting		Md. Abdul Wahhab Miah (born 1951)	11 November 2017	2 February 2018 (Resigned)	83 days	Abdul Hamid	
22		Syed Mahmud Hossain (born 1954)	2 February 2018	30 December 2021	3 years, 331 days	Abdul Hamid	
23		Hasan Foez Siddique (born 1956)	30 December 2021	25 September 2023	1 year, 269 days	Abdul Hamid	
24		Obaidul Hassan (born 1959)	26 September 2023	10 August 2024 (Resigned)	319 days	Mohammed Shahabuddin	
25		Syed Refaat Ahmed (born 1958)	10 August 2024	27 December 2025	2 years, 37 days	Mohammed Shahabuddin	
26		Zubayer Rahman Chowdhury (born 1961)	28 December 2025	17 May 2027	262 days	Mohammed Shahabuddin	

== Historical List ==
=== Chief Justice of East Pakistan ===
Chief Justice of Dhaka High Court
#	Portrait	Name	Appointment	Retirement	Term	President
1		A.S.M. Akram	1947	1949	3 year	Muhammad Ali Jinnah
2		Muhammad Shahabuddin	1949	1953	5 year	Khawaja Nazimuddin
3		Thomas Hobart Ellis	1953	1954	2 year	Malik Ghulam Muhammad
4		Amiruddin Ahmad	1954	1954	1 year	Malik Ghulam Muhammad
5		Amin Ahmed	1956	1959	4 year	Iskander Mirza
6		Mirza Ali Ispahani	1959	1960	1 year	Ayub Khan
7		Imam Hossain Choudhury	1960	1964	5 year	Ayub Khan
8		Syed Mahbub Murshed	1964	1967	4 year	Ayub Khan
9		Badruddin Ahmed Siddiky	1967	1971	5 year	Ayub Khan

== See also ==
- Supreme Court of Bangladesh
- Caretaker Government of Bangladesh
- Chief Adviser of Bangladesh
