= Khandoker Musa Khaled =

Bangladeshi judge

Justice of the High Court Division of Bangladesh

Personal details
- Profession: Judge

Khandoker Musa Khaled is a retired judge of the High Court Division of Bangladesh Supreme Court. He is a former director general of the Judicial Administration Training Institute.

== Career ==
Khaled was appointed an additional judge of the High Court Division along with eight other judges by an Awami League government in 2001.

In 2003, Khaled and three other judges (AHM Shamsuddin Chowdhury Manik, Mohammad Bazlur Rahman, and Mohammed Nizamul Huq) of the nine judges appointed by the Awami League government in 2001 were not made permanent judges of the High Court Division by the Bangladesh Nationalist Party government. Justices Mohammad Anwarul Haque, Mirza Hussain Haider, Nazrul Islam Chowdhury, Sheikh Rezowan Ali, and Syed Mohammad Dastagir Husain of the nine were confirmed as permanent judges of the High Court Division.

On 20 May 2021, Justice Nazmun Ara Sultana replaced Musa as the director general of the Judicial Administration Training Institute.
