= Mohammad Anwarul Haque =

Bangladeshi judge

- মোহাম্মদ আনোয়ার উল হক

Justice of the High Court Division of Bangladesh

Personal details
- Profession: Judge

Mohammad Anwarul Haque was a judge of the High Court Division of the Bangladesh Supreme Court.

== Biography ==
Anwar was appointed an additional judge of the High Court Division, along with eight other judges, by an Awami League government in 2001.

In 2003, Khandoker Musa Khaled and three other judges (AHM Shamsuddin Chowdhury Manik, Mohammad Bazlur Rahman, and Mohammed Nizamul Huq) of the nine judges appointed by the Awami League government in 2001 were not made permanent judges of the High Court Division by the Bangladesh Nationalist Party government. Justices Mohammad Anwarul Haque, Mirza Hussain Haider, Nazrul Islam Chowdhury, Sheikh Rezowan Ali, and Syed Mohammad Dastagir Husain of the nine were confirmed as permanent judges of the High Court Division.

In 2009, Anwar and Justice Kamrul Islam Siddiqui refused to hear a petition related to cantonment residence of former prime minister Khaleda Zia as they had handled documents related to the property. In February 2011, Anwar and Justice Syed Abu Kowser Md Dabirush-shan gave a split verdict on a petition challenging the legality of the 1974 agreement regarding prisoners of war from the Bangladesh Liberation War signed by Bangladesh, India, and Pakistan. Haque dismissed the petition while Syed Abu Kowser Md Dabirush-shan sought an explanation from the government on why the treaty should not be declared illegal.

Anwar died on 25 May 2024 in Square Hospital, Dhaka, Bangladesh.
