= Home Secretary of Bangladesh =

Senior civil servant of the Ministry of Home Affairs of Bangladesh

- বাংলাদেশের স্বরাষ্ট্র সচিব
- Government Seal of Bangladesh

- Flag of Bangladesh

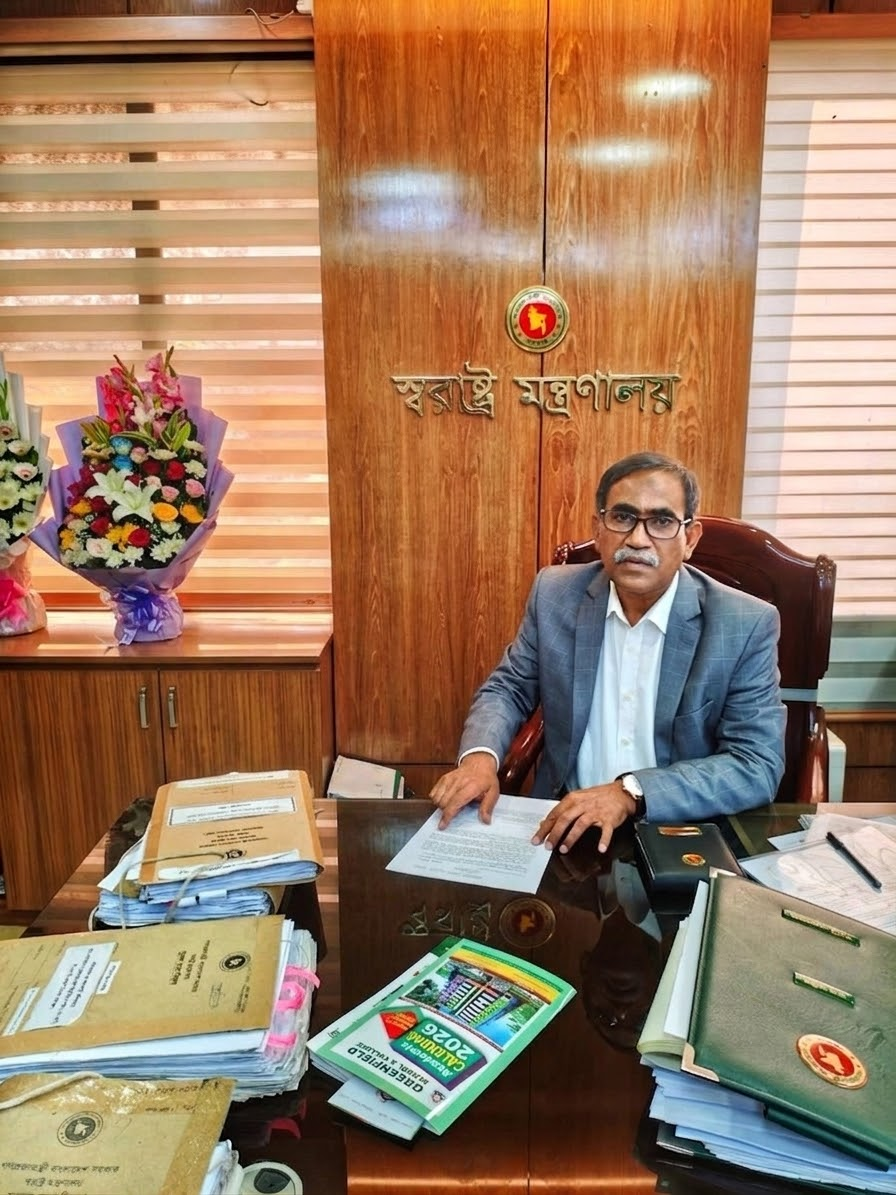
- Incumbent; Manzur Morshed Chowdhury since 25 February 2026
- Government of Bangladesh; Ministry of Home Affairs
- Type: Civil servant
- Status: Senior civil servant of the Ministry of Home Affairs
- Member of: Ministry of Home Affairs; Bangladesh Administrative Service; Bangladesh Civil Service
- Reports to: Minister of Home Affairs
- Seat: Bangladesh Secretariat, Dhaka
- Appointer: Government of Bangladesh
- Term length: Until the age of 59; Term contractually extendable
- Website: Official website

The Home Secretary of Bangladesh is the senior civil servant responsible for the administration of the Ministry of Home Affairs of the Government of Bangladesh. The office is normally held by a secretary or senior secretary of the government and is responsible for the ministry's administrative affairs.

The Ministry of Home Affairs is responsible for matters relating to internal security and public order and works through its departments and agencies in areas including policing, border management, immigration, prisons, fire and civil defence, and narcotics control.

The incumbent Home Secretary is Manzur Morshed Chowdhury, who serves as Senior Secretary of the Ministry of Home Affairs.

== List of Home Secretaries ==
No.	Image	Name	Took office	Left office	Ref.
1		Abdul Khaleque	4 September 1971	26 January 1973	
2		Shamsuddin Ahmed	27 January 1973	27 March 1975	
3		Md. Mahbubuzzaman	17 January 1979	14 April 1982	
4		Md. Khorshed Anwar	14 April 1982	17 May 1983	
5		Quazi Azhar Ali	17 May 1983	23 June 1986	
6		Sayeed Ahmed Mahmud	23 June 1986	23 February 1987	
7		A. K. M. Kamal Uddin Chowdhury	23 February 1987	1 June 1988	
8		Azim Uddin Ahmed	14 November 1989	26 December 1990	
9		M. A. Sayeed	27 December 1990	22 April 1991	
10		Muhammad Lutfullahil Majid	23 April 1991	19 August 1992	
11		Manzur-ul-Karim	20 August 1992	6 February 1993	
12		Azim Uddin Ahmed	30 March 1993	22 November 1995	
13		Syed Rezaul Hayat	26 November 1995	7 April 1997	
14		Safiur Rahman	8 April 1997	30 December 2000	
15		Sadat Hussain	18 July 2001	2 September 2002	
16		Muhammad Omar Faruk	2 September 2002	19 March 2005	
17		Safar Raj Hossain	20 March 2005	31 October 2006	
18		S. M. Zahurul Islam	31 October 2006	6 December 2006	
19		Md. Abdul Karim	7 December 2006	9 March 2009	
20		Abdus Sobhan Sikder	9 March 2009	3 October 2011	
21		Manzur Hossain	5 October 2011	6 February 2012	
22		C. Q. K. Mustaq Ahmed	6 February 2012	6 July 2014	
23		Mozammel Haque Khan	7 July 2014	20 December 2016	
24		Kamal Uddin Ahmed	21 December 2016	14 February 2017	
Public Security Division
25		Kamal Uddin Ahmed	14 February 2017	27 August 2017	
26		Mostafa Kamal Uddin	27 August 2017	12 January 2022	
27		Md. Akhtar Hossain	12 January 2022	30 October 2022	
28		Md. Aminul Islam Khan	30 October 2022	31 March 2023	
29		Md. Mostafizur Rahman	2 April 2023	30 May 2024	
30		Md. Jahangir Alam	30 May 2024	14 August 2024	
31		Md. Mokabbir Hossain	14 August 2024	18 August 2024	
32		Mohammad Abdul Momen	18 August 2024	9 December 2024	
Ministry of Home Affairs
33		Nasimul Gani	23 December 2024	16 February 2026	
34		Manzur Morshed Chowdhury	17 February 2026	Incumbent	

== See also ==
- Ministry of Home Affairs (Bangladesh)
- Government of Bangladesh
- Bangladesh Civil Service
- Secretary to the Government of Bangladesh
