= Khademul Islam Chowdhury =

Bangladeshi judge

Justice of the High Court Division of Bangladesh

Personal details
- Profession: Judge

Khademul Islam Chowdhury is a retired judge of the High Court Division of the Bangladesh Supreme Court. He was chairperson of the Chittagong Hill Tracts Land Dispute Resolution Commission.

== Career ==
In July 2005, Chowdhury and Justice Emdadul Haque Azad kept journalist Salahuddin Shoaib Chowdhury standing in dock at the court as punishment for ignoring a court order.

In May 2007, Chowdhury and Justice Md. Ashfaqul Islam granted bail to 39 Awami League activists, including British citizens, who were detained after flying to Bangladesh from London with former Prime Minister Sheikh Hasina. They were arrested by police under emergency powers and were accused of trying to destabilize Bangladesh.

Following Justice Abdus Salam Mamun filing a writ petition, Justice Khademul Islam Chowdhury and Justice Mashuque Hosain Ahmed of the High Court Division asked the government why it should not be ordered to make Mamun a permanent judge of the High Court Division on 23 July 2008.

In July 2009, Chowdhury was appointed chairperson of the Chittagong Hill Tracts Land Dispute Resolution Commission. Parbatya Chattagram Jana Sanghati Samity demanded the government of Bangladesh remove Chowdhury from the Chittagong Hill Tracts Land Dispute Resolution Commission. Raja Debasish Roy, Chief of Chakma Circle, also called for his removal.

In November 2013, Bangladesh Cricket Board created a disciplinary panel to examine match fixing allegation and from which a tribunal will be created. The panel was led by Justice Mohammad Abdur Rashid included Chowdhury, Nirmalendu Goon, and Sheikh Rezowan Ali. Chowdhury headed a three panel tribunal to examine evidence of match fixing in the second season of Bangladesh Premier League following the allegations of the Anti-Corruption and Security Unit of the International Cricket Council.
