= Durga Puja in Bangladesh =

Hindu religious and cultural festival

Durga Puja
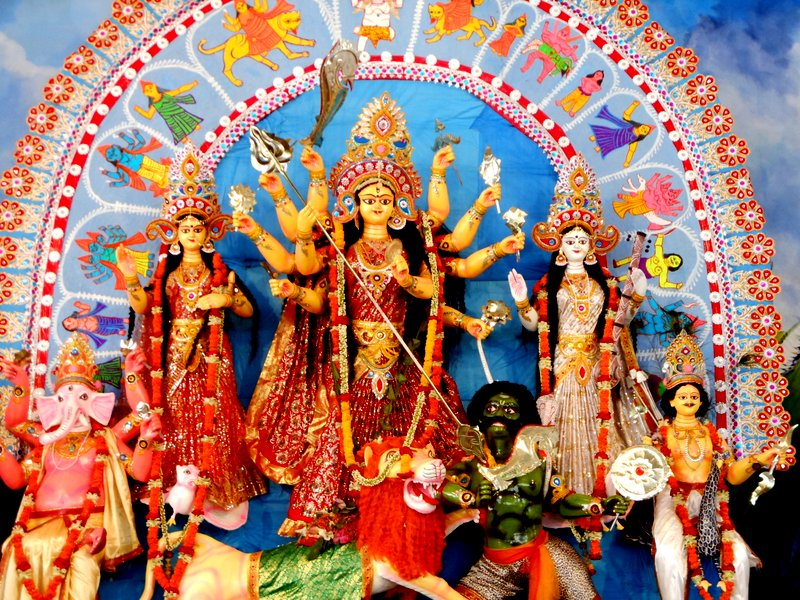
- Ramakrishna Mission Temple, Dhaka, 2013
- Official name: Sharadiya Durga Puja
- Also called: Durgotsava, Śāradotsava
- Observed by: Bangladeshi Hindus
- Type: Hindu festival
- Significance: Worship of Goddess Durga as Mahishasuramardini, symbolizing the triumph of good over evil
- Celebrations: Worship, cultural programs, Kumari Puja, Sindur Khela, Dhunuchi dance, immersion of idols
- Observances: Mahalaya, Bodhon, Saptami, Ashtami, Navami, Visarjan, Anjali, Hom Yajna
- Begins: Shashthi (Sixth day of Navaratri)
- Ends: Vijaya Dashami
- Date: During Ashwin (September–October)
- Duration: 5 days
- Frequency: Annual
- Related to: Navaratri, Vijayadashami

Durga Puja (Bengali: দুর্গাপূজা, Bengali pronunciation: [d̪uɾɡapud͡ʒa]) is one of the largest religious and cultural festivals and is among the principal festivals of the Hindu community of Bangladesh. In this festival, the goddess Durga is worshipped—she who is the destroyer of evil and the symbol of divine power. The Puja is usually celebrated during the Sharadiya Navaratri in the month of Ashwin (September–October) and continues for five days: Shashthi, Saptami, Ashtami, Navami, and Dashami. In Bangladesh, Durga Puja is observed on a grand scale primarily in temples and puja mandaps. Idols of the goddess are installed in the mandaps, and daily rituals, worship, and cultural programs are held. On the day of Shashthi, the goddess is ceremonially invited, and on Dashami, the festival concludes with the immersion of the idols. On the day of immersion, devotees bid farewell to the goddess by immersing the idols in rivers or ponds.

Durga Puja is celebrated in every district of Bangladesh, but the grandeur of the festivities is most prominent in major cities like Dhaka, Chattogram, Khulna, Rajshahi, and Barisal. One of the most important religious festivals for followers of Hinduism, Durga Puja is observed not only by Bengali Hindus but also by various other Hindus of indigenous communities in Bangladesh, including the Tripuri, Hajong, Banai, Oraon, Mahato, Patra, Koch, Barman, Ganjhu, Dalu, and several others.

In 2021, the number of puja mandaps across the country was 32,118, which increased by 46 in 2022, bringing the total to 32,168. In 2023, the number of permanent and temporary puja mandaps nationwide reached 32,460. In 2024, the number decreased, and Sharadiya Durga Puja was held in 31,461 mandaps and temples.

== Tradition and history ==
The tradition and history of Durga Puja in Bangladesh are deeply intertwined with the culture of the Indian subcontinent. It is one of the most important festivals for Hindus, centered around the worship of Goddess Durga in her form as Mahishasuramardini, the slayer of the buffalo demon Mahishasura. The modern form and timing of the festival in Bangladesh and West Bengal, India, are believed to have been initiated by Raja Kangsa Narayan of Tahirpur. During the reign of Emperor Akbar (1556–1605), the Rajshahi region of Bangladesh became notable for its distinctive features of the celebration, such as the display of various deities' sculptures and unique worship rituals.

Historically, Durga Puja has been celebrated in Bangladesh since the time of kings and maharajas. Particularly, in the late 19th and early 20th centuries, the festival gained popularity among the Hindu community. In various parts of Bangladesh—especially in cities like Dhaka, Narayanganj, Rajshahi, Rangpur and Chattogram—Durga Puja is celebrated with grandeur and festivity.

The rituals and customs of Durga Puja have been passed down through generations. Mahalaya, Shashthi, Saptami, Ashtami, Navami, and Dashami—each day has its own distinct significance and rites. Cultural elements such as Kumari Puja (the worship of a prepubescent girl as the goddess), theatrical performances, songs, and dances are also integral to the tradition of Durga Puja. Through these, reverence and devotion are expressed toward both the Creator and the creation.

In recent times, Durga Puja has become an inseparable part of Bangladesh's cultural and social life. Influenced by technology and modernity, the manner of celebration has evolved. In many cities, theme-based pavilions (pandals), decorative lighting, and cultural programs have transformed Durga Puja from a purely religious observance into a broader cultural festival.

In Bangladesh's political history, Durga Puja has at times been a source of conflict and difficulty. During periods of religious violence and communal riots, the celebration has faced threats. However, through social and cultural movements, the Hindu community has been able to preserve its heritage.

== Rituals and procedures of the worship ==
Durga Puja is celebrated with immense significance in Bangladesh, and its rituals and ceremonies are carried out following specific customs and procedures. The main festival spans five days, from the sixth to the tenth day (Shashthi to Dashami). Each day's religious observances and traditions are marked by purity, devotion, and discipline. The first new moon of the month of Ashwin is known as Mahalaya. On the sixth day after this new moon, the worship begins with the invocation of the goddess through Mahashashthi. Below is a detailed description of each ritual and procedure of Durga Puja:

=== Mahalaya ===
Durga Puja begins with Mahalaya. It is considered the preliminary preparation for the festival. This day marks the end of Pitri Paksha (the fortnight of the ancestors) and the beginning of Devi Paksha (the goddess's fortnight). On this day, the Hindu community performs Pitritarpan—offering black sesame seeds and water as an act of remembrance and peace for their ancestors. In the early hours of Mahalaya, Goddess Durga is invoked, and the Chandi path (recitation of hymns in praise of the goddess) is performed. In many places, symbolic festivities are held representing the arrival and departure of the goddess.

=== Shashthi (Bodhon) ===
The main rituals of Durga Puja commence on the day of Shashthi. This day is known as Bodhon, where the goddess is formally invoked. The priest chants specific mantras and performs Pran Pratistha—the ritual of instilling life into the idol. Through Bodhon, the goddess is invited into the mandap, and the official ceremonies of the Puja begin from Shashthi.

=== Saptami ===
Saptami is one of the principal days of the Puja. On this day, the Nabapatrika is installed, symbolizing the nine special forms of the goddess (Navadurga). The Nabapatrika is a bundle of nine sacred plants wrapped with a banana plant. It is called Kolabou or Nabapatrika, which is bathed in a sacred river and brought to the mandap, where it is placed beside the idol of the goddess. After that, the worship begins with offerings (Arghya) and Anjali (prayer with flowers). The main worship of the goddess begins on Saptami, with various offerings and rituals.

=== Ashtami ===
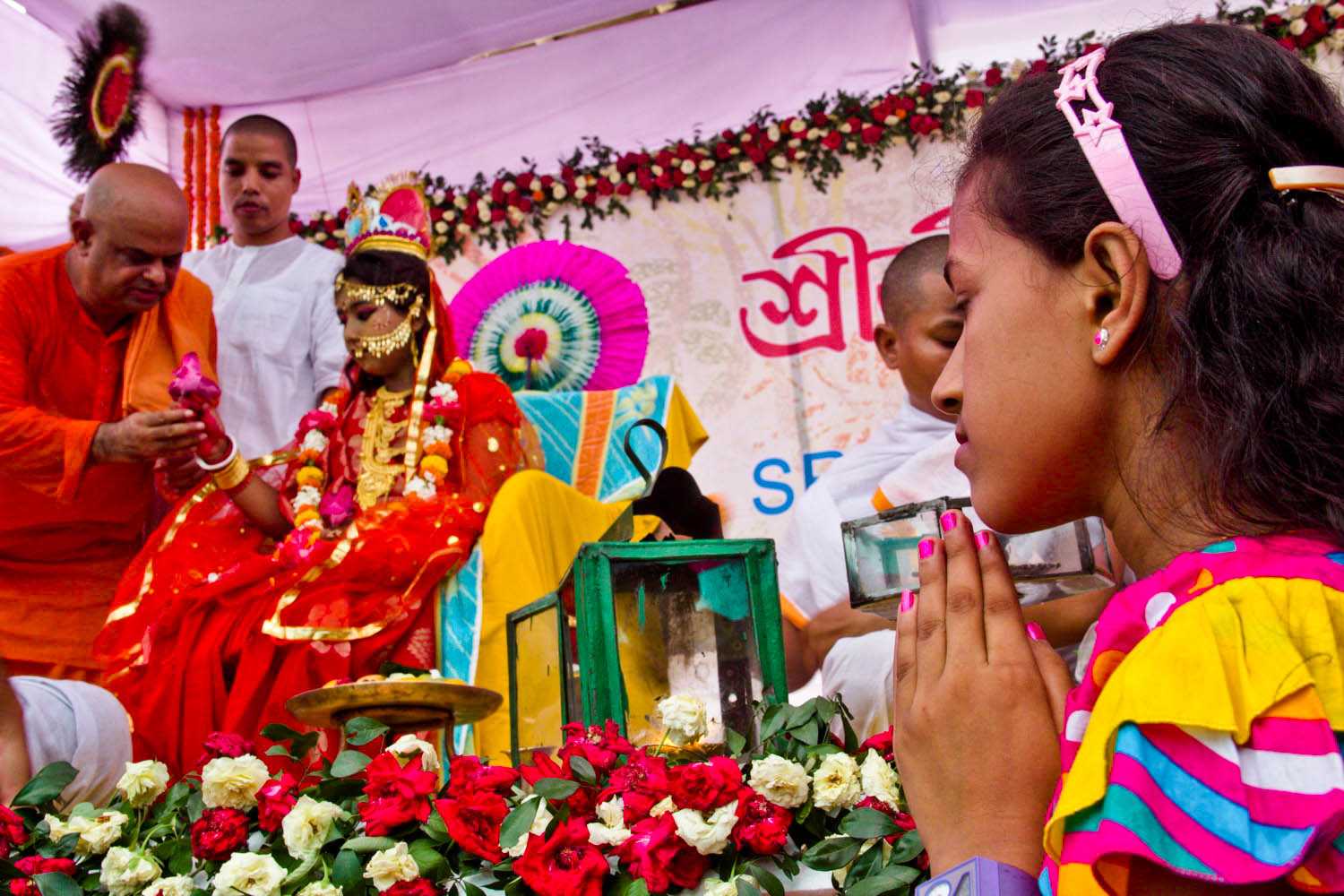
Kumari Puja

Mahashtami is the most significant day of Durga Puja. On this day, the Mahagauri form of the goddess is worshipped. The day begins with the chanting of Sanskrit hymns, and thousands of devotees offer Anjali to the goddess. The primary ritual of Ashtami is Kumari Puja, where a young girl is worshipped as a living embodiment of Goddess Durga, symbolizing the reverence for feminine power. Another vital ritual of Ashtami is the Sandhi Puja, which takes place at the juncture of Ashtami and Navami. This Puja is especially held in memory of the goddess's victory over Mahishasura in her form as Mahishasuramardini. During Sandhi Puja, 108 lamps are lit, and 108 lotus flowers are offered.

=== Navami ===
Navami is the final day of the full-fledged worship during Durga Puja. On this day, the Chandi form of the goddess—who defeated Mahishasura—is worshipped. Devotees offer Mahaprasad to the goddess and perform special rituals and a sacred fire ceremony (Hom Yajna). After offering Bhog (food) to the goddess on Navami, the Prasad is distributed among the devotees. Worshippers gather at the mandap to receive the blessings of the goddess and bow before her.

=== Vijaya dashami ===
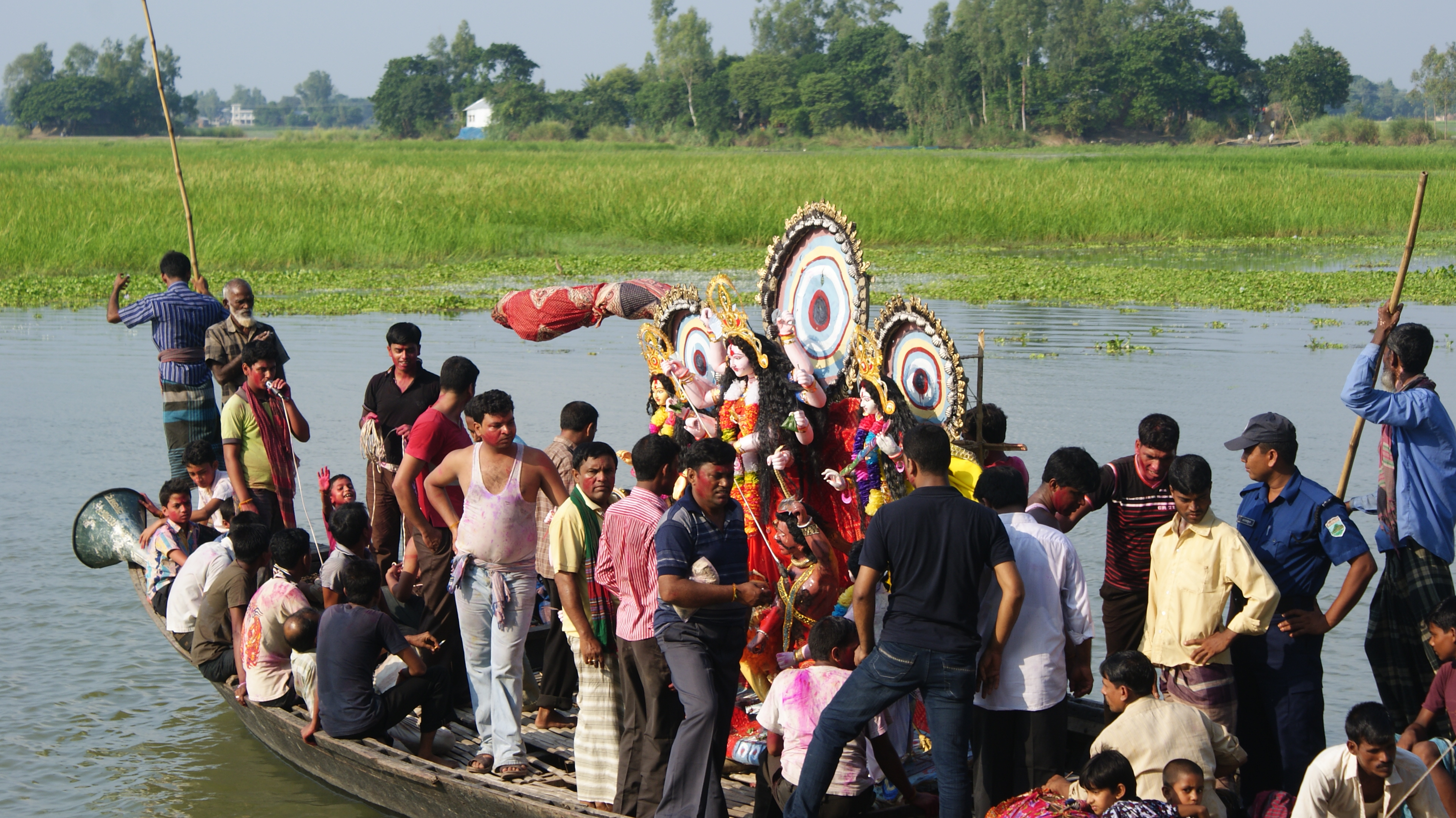
Pratima Visarjan

Vijaya Dashami marks the conclusion of Durga Puja. It is observed as the day of the goddess's departure. The main ritual of Dashami is the Visarjan (immersion). The idol of Goddess Durga is taken in a procession and immersed in a river or pond. During the immersion, devotees chant "Durga Ma Ki Jai" to bid farewell to the goddess. This ceremony symbolizes her return to the heavens and is accompanied by prayers for her return the following year.

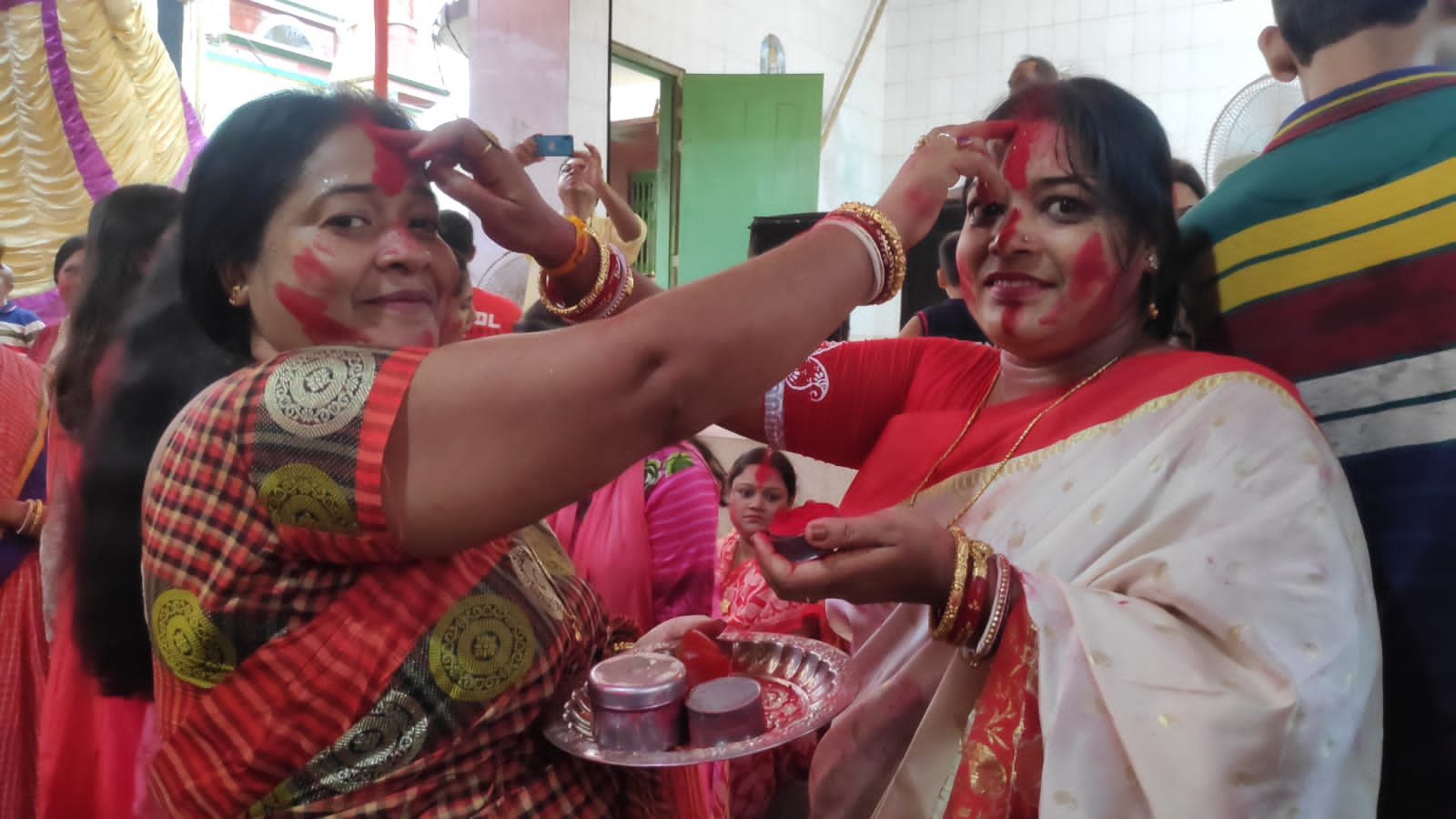
Shuvo Vijaya's sindoor khela

Another notable tradition on Vijaya Dashami is Sindur Khela. Married women smear vermillion on each other's foreheads and apply it to the goddess's forehead while praying for her blessings. Sindur Khela is a symbol of joy and is one of the most colorful customs of Durga Puja.

=== Anjali and Prasad ===
Every day during the Puja, devotees offer Anjali—prayers using flowers to the goddess. After the Puja, the Bhog offered to the goddess is distributed as Prasad among the devotees. Prasad typically includes fruits, sweets, and rice-based dishes.

=== Aarti and Dhunuchi dance ===
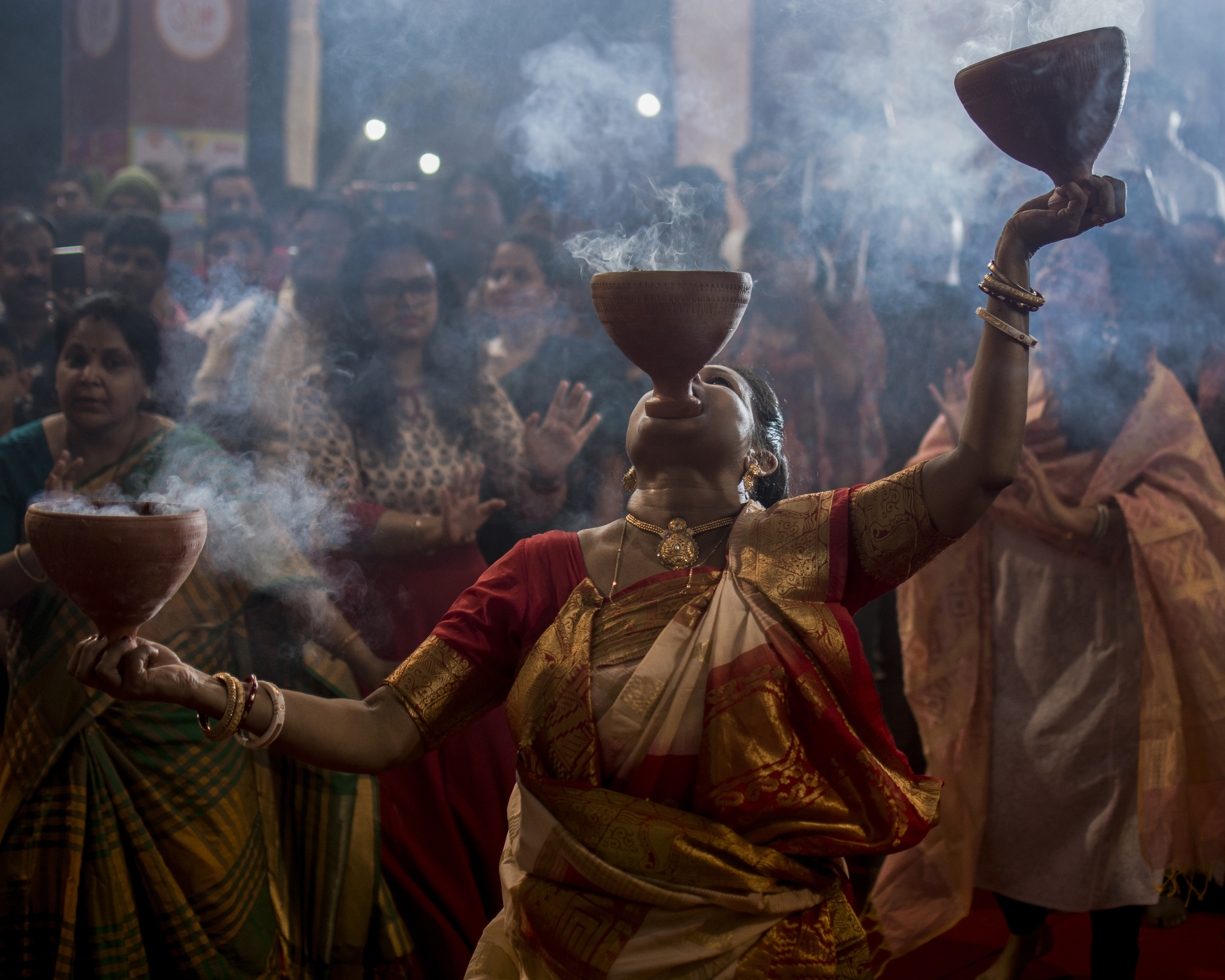
Traditional Dhunuchi Nritya

Every evening, a special Aarti is held, where candles, incense, and oil lamps are offered to the goddess. During Aarti, the Dhunuchi Nritya takes place, in which devotees perform dances while holding dhunuchis (incense burners) in their hands. This dance is one of the most captivating parts of the Puja celebration.

=== Homyajna ===
On Navami, a Hom Yajna (fire ritual) is performed as part of the Puja. Priests chant mantras while lighting the sacred fire, and devotees offer oblations (Arghya) into it, seeking the goddess's blessings.

=== Feeding the poor and donations ===
During Durga Puja, many temples and mandaps distribute food among the poor and underprivileged. Additionally, there is a tradition of performing charity and making donations to seek the blessings of the goddess.

The main aim of the rituals and customs of Durga Puja in Bangladesh is to express devotion to Goddess Durga, attain spiritual peace through religious observance, and strengthen familial and social bonds.

== Social impact ==
Durga Puja is celebrated in Bangladesh as a major religious festival, and it has a significant social impact on the society. This festival plays a vital role in communal harmony, cultural exchange, and economic activities. During Durga Puja, various cultural programs such as music, dance, drama, and decorative lighting are organized.

Durga Puja also brings a surge in demand for large pandals, worship materials, clothing, offerings, and lighting, which contributes significantly to the local economy. Many people buy new clothes and gifts during the festival, and artists, craftsmen, and laborers are employed to decorate temples and pandals. This creates a temporary boom in business and invigorates the local economy.

Durga Puja is also a time for families, relatives, and friends to come together, deepening social relationships. People invite each other to their homes during the festival, which strengthens friendship and social bonds. During Durga Puja, many temples and organizations arrange charitable activities. These include distributing food to the poor, handing out winter clothes, and organizing educational programmes.

At times, incidents of communal unrest or violence can occur during Durga Puja, which creates social tension. But in recent years, the law enforcement agencies have tightened security during the festival. In recent years, there has been a growing trend of environmental awareness regarding pandal and idol construction and immersion. Many places now use eco-friendly materials, which play an important role in protecting the environment.

== Major Durga Puja venues ==
Durga Puja is celebrated in Bangladesh with great enthusiasm, and many devotees crowd the main locations. Although Durga Puja is organized across various parts of the country, some specific places are renowned for their popularity. Among them, the notable major Durga Puja venues are:

=== Dhaka ===
- Dhakeshwari Temple: Among Dhaka's traditional Hindu temples, Dhakeshwari Temple is one of the most prominent. Here, Durga Puja is organized in a grand and lavish manner.
- Jagannath Hall Puja Mandap of Dhaka University.
- Ramakrishna Math and Mission: Located in Gopibagh, Dhaka, this monastery holds Durga Puja every year with the participation of many devotees.
- Ramna Kali Temple
- Banani Puja Mandap: Every year, a temporary Puja mandap is set up at the Banani playground. This extravagant and opulent mandap draws many visitors.
- Khamarbari Puja Mandap: Located next to the Krishibid Institute Bangladesh (KIB), the Khamarbari Puja Mandap is widely discussed due to its lighting, the beauty of the idols, entrance design, interior structure, and pandal artistry.
- Old Dhaka Puja Mandaps
- Shree Shree Siddheshwari Kali Temple: Situated within the Siddheshwari area, near Mouchak Market.

=== Chattogram ===
- Choumuhani Sarbojanin Bijoya Durga Temple: In Noakhali, this mandap once featured Bangladesh's tallest Durga idol, standing 71 feet high.
- Anandamoyi Kalibari Temple: This temple in Chattogram is famous for Durga Puja. Thousands of devotees gather here during the festival.

=== Rangpur ===
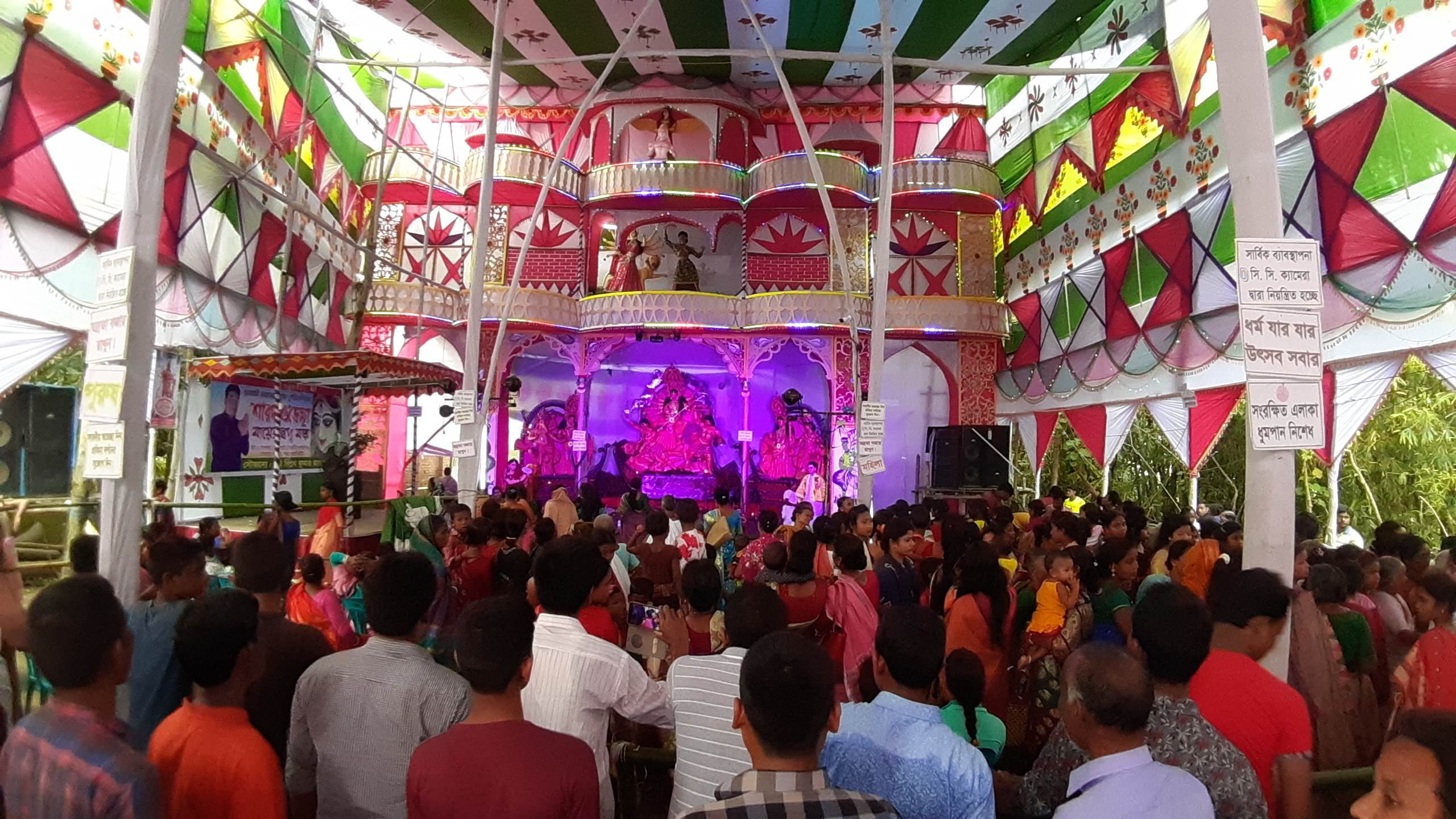
Senpara Kalir Path Sarbojanin Durga Temple

- Shri Shri Karunamoyi Kalibari, Rangpur Sadar
- Madan Mohan Thakur Bari, Palpara, Rangpur
- Sindurmati Sarbojanin Durga Temple, Lalmonirhat
- Senpara Kalir Path Sarbojanin Durga Temple
- Shri Shri Radha-Giridhari Temple, Baniar Dighi, Lalmonirhat

=== Cumilla ===
- Nanuar Dighi Bank: One of the major centers for Durga Puja in Cumilla. The puja mandaps here are decorated beautifully.

=== Sylhet ===
- In Gowainghat, various temples of the Hindu community celebrate the Durga Puja festival in the Sylhet region in a joyful and vibrant atmosphere.

=== Rajshahi ===
- Durga Puja is extensively celebrated in various temples of Rajshahi city, with especially large-scale celebrations in the central temples of the city.

=== Khulna ===
- Shikdar Bari Puja Mandap: In 2023, at Shikdar Bari in South Hakimpur, Bagerhat Sadar, the puja mandap was adorned with 501 idols. The organizers claimed it to be the largest mandap in Asia in terms of the number of idols.
- Math in Gopalganj: In the Khulna region, Durga Puja is celebrated here with great pomp and festivity.

=== Barisal ===
- Madhabpasha Durga Puja: In the Barisal region, the Madhabpasha Durga Puja is a traditional and well-known celebration.

== Government role ==
During the time of Puja, law enforcement agencies (police, RAB, BGB) are deployed across the country to strengthen security. Surveillance is especially increased at Puja mandaps, and CCTV cameras are installed at important locations. The government assigns sufficient numbers of police personnel, female police officers, and volunteers around the Puja mandaps so that devotees can celebrate the Puja safely. In Bangladesh, Vijaya Dashami, the last day of Durga Puja, is a public holiday, and Ashtami and Navami are optional holidays.

In 2024, when there was a demand to extend the holidays, the interim government's Home Affairs Adviser M. Sakhawat Hossain recommended a three-day holiday for Durga Puja. Later, one additional day of leave was granted. Every year, the government provides a financial grant of 20 million BDT for temples and Puja mandaps.

== Attacks ==
=== 2021 ===
Between 13 and 19 October 2021, during the Durga Puja festival, communal violence was incited across Bangladesh against the Hindu community, triggered by a viral video showing a copy of the Quran placed under the feet of an idol in a temple. As a result, over fifty temples and temporary puja pavilions were vandalized across Bangladesh. Police investigations revealed that the Quran had been placed there by a man named Iqbal Hossain. CCTV footage showed him emerging from a nearby shrine at midnight with the Quran in hand, heading toward the puja pavilion, and later wandering the streets holding the weapon from the hand of the idol of Hanuman.

=== 2024 ===
During the Durga Puja that took place after the 2024 Student–People's uprising, several unpleasant incidents occurred. For example, on 15 September, in Bhanga Upazila of Faridpur, eight Durga idols under construction in a temple were vandalized. In several temples in Khulna, anonymous letters were sent demanding a ransom of 500,000 taka to allow Durga Puja to proceed. On 3 October, in the Boro Bazar–Manipurghat Road area of Batrish in Kishoreganj District town, idols were vandalized at the Sri Sri Jiur Akhra. On 8 October, the sixth day of Durga Puja, five idols at the Durga Puja pavilion of the Sajankanda District Road Transport Owners' Unity Council Temple in Rajbari were vandalized.

== See also ==
- Culture of Bangladesh
- List of festivals of Bangladesh
- Hinduism in Bangladesh
- Freedom of religion in Bangladesh
- 2021 Bangladesh anti-Hindu violence
