= Gour Gopal Saha =

Bangladeshi judge

Justice of the High Court Division of Bangladesh

Personal details
- Profession: Judge

Gour Gopal Saha (died 2018) was a retired Justice of the High Court Division of the Bangladesh Supreme Court and a Hindu community activist.

== Career ==
On 6 November 2002, Saha and Justice Sheikh Rezowan Ali issued a verdict which stated that courts must record the reason for allowing additional evidence in an ongoing trial.

In April 2010, Saha, as chairman of the Administrative Appellate Tribunal, issued a verdict declaring the termination of 84 upazila election officers in September 2007 by the caretaker government illegal. The officers were appointed by the previous Bangladesh Nationalist Party government.

In February 2011, Justice AHM Shamsuddin Chowdhury Manik and Justice Sheikh Md Zakir Hossain of the High Court Division declared it illegal for Saha to be the chairman of the Administrative Appellate Tribunal. Advocate Tapash Kumar Pal filed the petition against Saha holding the post as he was the President of Ramakrishna Math & Ramakrishna Mission Dhaka and the Hindu Religious Welfare Trust which violated the terms of his position at the chairman of the tribunal.

Saha was the vice-chairman of the Bangladesh Hindu Religious Welfare Trust in 2017. He criticized Chief Justice Surendra Kumar Sinha for his comments on Sheikh Mujibur Rahman in the 16th amendment verdict and said his actions had placed the Hindu community on trial in Bangladesh.

Saha is the President of Gendaria's Shree Shree Shiv Mandir. He was a patron of the Bangladesh Chapter of the Asian Conference of Religions for Peace.

== Death ==
Saha died on 4 September 2018 in Dhaka, Bangladesh.
