= Kamrul Islam =

Kamrul Islam may refer to:

- Kamrul Islam (footballer), Bangladeshi footballer
- Kamrul Islam (physician), Bangladeshi doctor
- Kamrul Islam Imon, Bangladeshi cricketer
- Kamrul Islam Rabbi, Bangladeshi cricketer
- Kamrul Islam Siddiqui, Bangladeshi judge

== See also ==
- Mohammad Quamrul Islam, Bangladeshi politician
- Qamrul Islam (born 1950), Bangladeshi politician
- Qamar ul Islam, Indian politician
- Quamrul Islam Siddique, Bangladeshi engineer
