= Abdus Salam Mamun =

Bangladeshi judge

The Honourable Abdus Salam Mamun

Justice of the High Court Division of Bangladesh
- Incumbent
- Assumed office 27 July 2002

Personal details
- Profession: Judge

Abdus Salam Mamun is a Justice of the High Court Division of the Bangladesh Supreme Court.

== Career ==
Mamun was appointed to the High Court Division on 27 July 2002 by President Iajuddin Ahmed. In January 2003, Mamun and Justice Mohammad Joynul Abedin issued a stay order on elections in Sandwip Municipality. In April 2004, Mamun and Justice Shah Abu Naim Mominur Rahman declared crown and hunter drinks illegal.

Mamun served for two years on the High Court Division and received a six-month extension on 29 July 2004 and was assured by the minister of law Barrister Moudud Ahmed that his appointment would be confirmed. Mamun left the High Court Division in February 2005 after his appointment was not made permanent.

Mamun sued Chief Justice Syed JR Mudassir Husain for not recommending him for a permanent position on personal issues and demanding the dismissal of the chief justice on 8 April. The case was dismissed by Justice Shah Abu Nayeem Mominur Rahman and Justice Mainul Islam Chowdhury on 17 April 2005.

Mamun filed a writ petition and on 23 July 2008 Justice Khademul Islam Chowdhury and Justice Mashuque Hosain Ahmed of the High Court Division asked the government why it should not be ordered to make Mamun a permanent judge of the High Court Division.

In 2021, Mamun joined a new political party, Noitik Samaj, founded by AMSA Amin.

== Personal life ==
In December 2014, Justice Sheikh Abdul Awal and Justice Abu Taher Mohammad Saifur Rahman granted bail to an Islamic State recruit and son of Justice Abdus Salam Mamun. The Chief Justice Md Muzammel Hossain of the Appellate Division of the Bangladesh Supreme Court canceled the bail order of his son, Asif Adnan Shuvo, and Fazle Elahi Tanzil, another recruit and son of a bureaucrat. However Asif Adnan was later acquitted of all charges from the court.
