= Abu Saleh Sheikh Mohammad Zahirul Haque =

Abu Saleh Sheikh Mohammad Zahirul Haque (8 August 1958 - 7 August 2020) was the Secretary of the Ministry of Law of Bangladesh. He served at the Ministry of Law when the Chief Justice Surendra Kumar Sinha was forced to flee Bangladesh.

== Early life ==
Zahirul Haque was born on 8 August 1958 in Shahjadpur Upazila, Sirajganj District, East Pakistan, Pakistan. He finished his SSC and HSC under the Board of Intermediate and Secondary Education, Rajshahi. He completed his bachelor of law from the University of Rajshahi.

== Career ==
As Rajshahi additional sessions judge, Zahirul Haque presided over the trial Aminul Haque, Ruhul Quddus Talukdar, Nadim Mostafa, and 27 others on terrorism charges in June 2007.

In December 2013, Zahirul Haque attended a secret meeting of top law and judiciary officials regarding the execution of Abdul Quader Mollah at the office of Shafique Ahmed, law advisor to Prime Minister Sheikh Hasina. The meeting was attended by Mahbubey Alam, Attorney General of Bangladesh, AKM Nasir Uddin Mahmud, registrar of the International Crimes Tribunal, C. Q. K. Mustaq Ahmed, Secretary of the Ministry of Home Affairs, and Hassan Mahmood Khandker, Inspector General of Police. While the participants of the meeting did not saying anything about the subject a similar meeting was held before an arrest warrant was issued against Mollah.

Zahirul Haque was appointed Secretary of the Ministry of Law on 2 February 2015. In October 2016, Justices M Enayetur Rahim and J. B. M. Hassan of the High Court Division issued a contempt of court ruling against Zahirul Haque, Mohammad Shahidul Haque, secretary of the Legislative and Parliamentary Affairs Division, and the secretary of the Ministry of Social Welfare for not providing the court with a clarification regarding the Children Act, 2013. He served under Anisul Huq, Minister of Law. He suspended Mohammad Juel Rana, Additional Judge of Fifth Dhaka District and Session Judge Court, after he wrote a complaint to the President of Bangladesh.

Following his retirement on 7 August 2017, the government reappointed him law secretary on a two-year contract. Ashraf-uz Zaman, a lawyer on the Bangladesh Supreme Court, filed a petition with the High Court Division challenging the legality of his contractual appointment. Justice Syed Muhammad Dastagir Husain and Justice Md. Ataur Rahman Khan passed a stay order on his appointment. Justice Syed Mahmud Hossain of the Appellate Division issued a stop order on the High Court Division stay order in August 2017. There were some dissent in the Bangladesh Civil Service over the contractual reappointed of senior civil servants.

Zahirul Haque sacked five Deputy Attorney Generals; Abdullah Al Mamun, Manjur Kader, Md Jahangir Alam, Shaikh AKM Moniruzzaman Kabir, and Zahirul Haque Zahir in October 2018.

== Death ==
Zahirul Haque died from COVID-19 on 6 August 2020 at the Bangabandhu Sheikh Mujib Medical University.
