= Zuena Aziz =

Bangladeshi civil servant

Chief Coordinator (SDG Affairs) Prime Minister's Office (Bangladesh)
- In office 9 January 2020 – 8 January 2023
- Prime Minister: Sheikh Hasina
- Preceded by: Md. Abul Kalam Azad
- Succeeded by: Akhtar Hossain

Personal details
- Born: 1961 (age 64–65) Noakhali District, Bangladesh
- Spouse: Enayet Hossain Khan
- Children: Subeh Ashfarah (daughter); Baizid Farabi (son)
- Parent(s): Azizul Haque (father); Mukima Khatun (mother)
- Education: University of Dhaka; Harvard University

Zuena Aziz is a retired senior secretary and the former Principal Coordinator for Sustainable Development Goals at the Prime Minister's Office of Sheikh Hasina. She was the Secretary of the Information and Communication Technology Division. She was an Additional Secretary to the Local Government Division. She was an advisor of the Bangladesh Girl Guides Association. She was a member of Physical Infrastructure Division of the Bangladesh Planning Commission.

== Early life ==
Aziz was born in 1961 in Noakhali District, East Pakistan and finished her schooling in Noakhali. Her father, Azizul Haque, was a veteran of Bangladesh Liberation War and her mother, Mukima Khatun, was a school teacher. She did her bachelor's degree and masters in Bengali language and Literature at the University of Dhaka.

== Career ==
Aziz joined the Bangladesh Civil Service in 1984 as an admin cadre and started working in 1986 after her training. She was the Thana Nirbahi Officer of Sreepur Upazila.

Aziz was the joint secretary of the Local Government Division in 2012. While she was the Senior Secretary at the Ministry of Social Welfare, she implemented the National Social Security Strategy. She was promoted to secretary in May 2016 and was appointed a member of the Bangladesh Planning Commission.

On 1 January 2020, Aziz was appointed the Principal Coordinator for Sustainable Development Goals at the Prime Minister's Office of Sheikh Hasina. She replaced Md Abul Kalam Azad.

In April 2022, Aziz was awarded the BASIS (Bangladesh Association of Software and Information Services) Luna Shamsuddoha Award. She was an advisor of the Bangladesh Girl Guides Association. Md. Akther Hossain succeeded her as the Principal Coordinator for Sustainable Development Goals at the Prime Minister's Office of Sheikh Hasina.

After the fall of the Sheikh Hasina led Awami League government, a murder case was filed against Aziz by Bangladesh Nationalist Party politician Mohammad Zaman Hossain Khan over the death of a protestor in July 2024.

== Personal life ==
Aziz is married Enayet Hossain Khan, a journalist. They have one son, Baezid Farabi Khan, a civil servant and another daughter, Subeh Ashfarah, a lawyer.
