= Nazmun Ara Sultana =

Bangladeshi Judge

- নাজমুন আরা সুলতানা
- Born: July 8, 1950 (age 76); Moulvibazar District
- Education: LLB
- Occupation: Judge
- Title: Director General of Judicial Administration Training Institute
- Predecessor: Khandoker Musa Khaled

Nazmun Ara Sultana (born July 8, 1950) is the first woman in Bangladesh to serve as head of an Appellate Division bench in the Supreme Court. The Supreme Court is the apex court that gives a final verdict in the country's judicial system. Sultana took the oath as the first female justice of the Appellate Division on February 23, 2011. She went into retirement on July 7, 2017.

== Early life and education ==
Sultana was born in Moulvibazar in 1950 into a distinguished family with deep roots in the region. Her father, Chowdhury Abul Kasem Moinuddin, served as a commissioned officer in the British Indian Army prior to the partition, alongside his cousin, General M. A. G. Osmani. Sultana was the third of five children, and lost her father at the age of 11. Her mother, Begum Rashida Sultana Deen was a teacher at Radha Sundari Girls' High School in Mymensingh. Sultana passed the SSC examination from Vidyamoyee Government Girls' High School in 1965 and the HSC exam from Muminunnesa Women's College in 1967. She earned her B.Sc. from Ananda Mohan College and went on to complete her LLB from Momenshahi Law College, Mymensingh.

Sultana's grandfather, Shamsul Ulama Maulana Abdul Monayem Chowdhury, hailed from Longla in Sylhet and was a respected scholar who taught at the Calcutta Aliah Madrasa, now known as Aliah University. Her uncle, Abu Lais Chowdhury, served as the Director of Public Instruction (DPI) for Assam Province during British India.

== Career ==
Sultana began her legal career as an advocate at the Mymensingh District Court in July 1972. She ranked among the top three in the Bangladesh Civil Service (Judiciary) examination and entered the Judicial Service as a Munsif on December 20, 1975. Over the years, she held various ranks within the judiciary, eventually being promoted to District and Sessions Judge on December 20, 1990. Throughout her service, she worked in several districts, including Khulna, Brahmanbaria, Comilla, Tangail, and Faridpur.

On May 28, 2000, Sultana was appointed an Additional Judge of the High Court Division of the Supreme Court of Bangladesh, and two years later, on May 28, 2002, she was confirmed as a permanent Judge of the same Division. On February 23, 2011, she took the oath as the first female justice of the Appellate Division of the Supreme Court of Bangladesh.

Sultana was the founding president of the Bangladesh Women Judges Association (BWJA) and has been an active member of the International Association of Women Judges (IAWJ) since its foundation in 1991. She served two consecutive four-year terms as Secretary of the IAWJ.

== Personal life ==
Sultana is married to Quazi Nurul Haque, the former general manager of Bangladesh Steel and Engineering Corporation. They have two sons, both of whom are electrical engineers.
