= Raisuddin =

Raisuddin (Bengali: রঈসুদ্দীন) is a Bengali masculine given name of Arabic origin. Notable persons with this name are:

== Given name ==
- Raisuddin Ahmed (1939–2021), Bangladeshi cricketer
- Raisud-Din Ahmed, Bangladeshi politician from Mymensingh

== Surname ==
- Muhammad Rais Uddin (born 1956), Bangladeshi high court justice
- Md. Rais Uddin (academic), Bangladeshi academic and Vice-Chancellor

== See also ==
- Rais (disambiguation)
- Uddin
