= Keya Group =

Bangladeshi diversified conglomerate

- Company type: Public
- Traded as: DSE: KEYACOSMET; CSE: KEYACOSMET
- Industry: Consumer goods
- Founded: 1996; 30 years ago
- Founder: Abdul Khaleque Pathan
- Headquarters: Dhaka, Bangladesh
- Area served: Bangladesh
- Key people: Abdul Khaleque Pathan (Chairperson); Khaleda Pathan (Managing Director); Homaun Kabir (CFO)
- Products: Cosmetics; Detergent; Toilet cleaner
- Brands: List: Keya Cosmetics Limited; Keya Europe; Keya Cotton Mills; Keya Knit Composite; Keya Agro Process Limited; Keya Yarn Mills Limited; Keya Spinning Mill; Knit Composite Division
- Revenue: ▼ ৳9.01 billion (US$74 million)(FY 2020)
- Operating income: ▲ ৳1.83 billion (US$15 million)(FY 2020)
- Net income: ▲ ৳236.38 million (US$1.9 million)(FY 2020)
- Total assets: ▲ ৳22.66 billion (US$190 million)(FY 2020)
- Total equity: ▲ ৳209.3 million (US$1.7 million)(FY 2020)

Keya Group (Bengali: কেয়া গ্রুপ) is a Bangladeshi diversified conglomerate based in Dhaka. The company was founded by Abdul Khalek Pathan in 1983. It is one of the largest cosmetic brands in Bangladesh.

== History ==
Keya Cosmetics Limited was established in 1996. Its founder and chairperson is Abdul Khaleque Pathan. It paid 10 to 50 percent dividends on its stocks in 2001.

Keya Detergent Limited and Keya Soap Chemicals Limited were merged with Keya Cosmetics Limited in 2010. Keya Soap Chemicals was the only company not listed on the Dhaka Stock Exchange.

Keya Cosmetics announced that it will sponsor Suhrawardy Cup National under-19 football championship.

Keya group employed around 1,000 physically challenged workers. in 2016, out of the 6461 workers, 966 were differently-able.

Keya Cotton Mills, Keya Knit Composite, and Keya Spinning Mills were merged in 2015 with Keya Cosmetics. Bangladesh Securities and Exchange Commission initially opposed the move as the three companies were burdened with large liabilities while Key Cosmetics is listed on the Dhaka Stock Exchange. The merger received approval from Bangladesh High Court. In September 2015, about 500 Keya Knit Composite Limited workers felt sick after drinking water at the canteen. 100 more workers fell sick a few days at the same factory.

The company shares performed well in the Dhaka Stock Market in 2007. The sponsor directors reduced shares from 62 percent to 46 percent in 2017. They failed to offload further shares due to lack of demand. The company shifted its office from Banani to Gazipur, where its factories are located, to reduce costs. The company has 8.5 billion taka in long-term loans and 6.3 billion in short-term loans.

In May 2018, Keya Group signed an agreement with Khulna University to research crab farming in Bangladesh.

== Controversies ==
In 2017 Anti-Corruption Commission arrested the Chairperson of Keya Group, Abdul Khaleque Pathan, for allegedly embezzling 1.11 billion taka from Bangladesh Krishi Bank Limited. Financial Reporting Council Bangladesh estimated that Keya Group had laundered more than 10 billion taka through their European subsidiary. In 2018, Abdul Khaleque Pathan, his wife, Feroza Begum, and son, Tansin Keya, sold two billion taka worth of shares to pay off bank loans in 2018. Keya also violated Dhaka Stock Exchange rules by not publishing their quarterly statements. Four directors of Keya Group were fined on 24 July 2018 by Bangladesh Securities and Exchange Commission. Keya Group has 1.57 billion taka loan from Pubali Bank. An investigation by Dhaka Stock Exchange found irregularities in the company's shares. It had been suffering from financial problems.

Keya Group has announced the permanent closure of four textile factories—including knit composite garments, knitting, spinning, and cotton divisions, plus Keya Yarn Mills—in Konabari, Gazipur, effective May 1, 2025, due to severe financial challenges. This closure will render approximately 8,000 workers jobless, among them around 1,000 individuals with disabilities. While these textile operations are shutting down, the dyeing unit (employing 400–500 workers) and the cosmetics/detergent wing—generating BDT 25–26 crore monthly—will continue operations. Keya Group owes banks around BDT 3,000 crore or roughly U.S. $245 million, and its chairman blamed the situation on banks confiscating the company's export earnings—allegedly violating central bank rules—further crippling working capital.

== Sister Concerns ==
- Keya Cosmetics Limited (Keya Soap, lifeguard, active toothpaste, Super Saloon, and Ice Magic)
- Keya Europe
- Keya Cotton Mills
- Keya Knit Composite
- Keya Agro Process Limited
- Keya Yarn Mills Limited
- Keya Cotton Mills
- Khaleque Knitting and Garments Industries Private Limited
- Keya Spinning Mills
- Knit Composite Division
