= C. Q. K. Mustaq Ahmed =

- সি. কিউ. কে. মুস্তাক আহমেদ
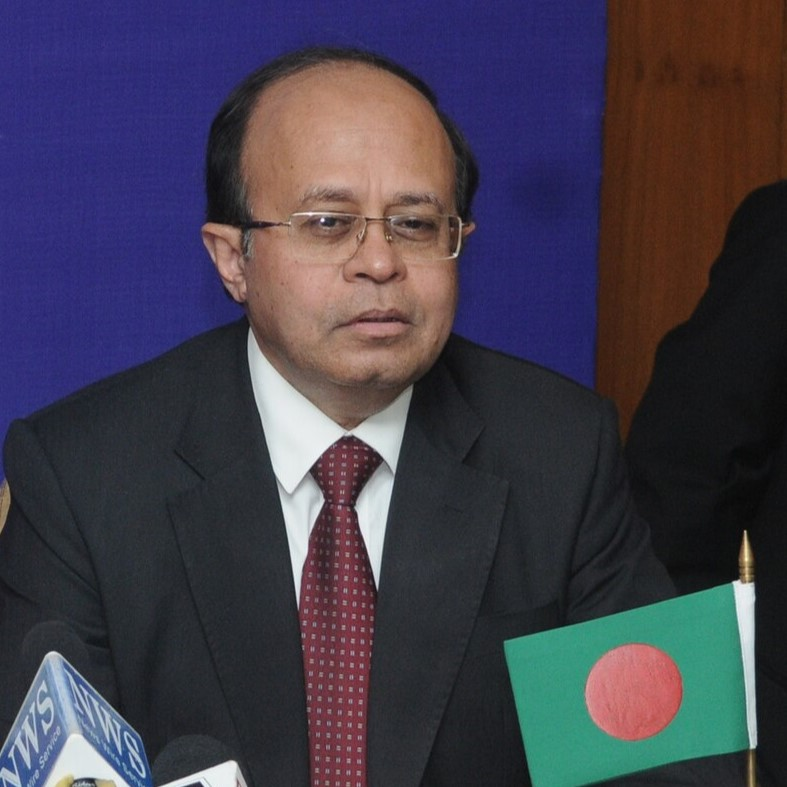
- Born: 1955 (age 70–71); Sylhet District, East Pakistan, Pakistan (present day Sylhet, Bangladesh)
- Citizenship: Bangladesh
- Education: University of Dhaka
- Organization: Ministry of Home Affairs

C. Q. K. Mustaq Ahmed is a retired Ministry of Home Affairs secretary and a businessman. He is the chairman of Prime Bank Investment Limited. He is the former Chairman of Financial Reporting Council, a financial regulatory agency.

== Early life ==
Ahmed was born in 1955 in Sylhet District, East Pakistan, Pakistan. (present day Sylhet, Bangladesh) He did his bachelor and masters in economics at the University of Dhaka.

== Career ==
Ahmed joined the administration cadre of Bangladesh Civil Service in January 1981.

Ahmed had served as the Director General of the NGO Affairs Bureau. He was the first secretary of the Bangladesh High Commission to the United Kingdom and Private secretary to the Speaker of the Bangladesh Parliament.

Ahmed was appointed the secretary of the Ministry of Liberation War Affairs in 2008. From 2008 to 2009, Ahmed was the secretary of the Bridges Division in the Ministry of Road Transport and Bridges. From 2009 to 2012, he was the secretary of the Ministry of Agriculture. In February 2012, he was appointed secretary of the Ministry of Home Affairs replacing Manzur Hossain who was transferred to the Ministry of Agriculture. The move was made after the position of the Inspector General of Police, under the Ministry of Home Affairs, was elevated to Senior Secretary.

In December 2013, Ahmed attended a secret meeting of top law and judiciary officials regarding the execution of Abdul Quader Mollah at the office of Shafique Ahmed, law advisor to Prime Minister Sheikh Hasina. The meeting was attended by Mahbubey Alam, Attorney General of Bangladesh, AKM Nasir Uddin Mahmud, registrar of the International Crimes Tribunal, Abu Saleh Sheikh Mohammad Zahirul Haque, Secretary of the Ministry of Law, and Hassan Mahmood Khandker, Inspector General of Police. While the participants of the meeting did not saying anything about the subject a similar meeting was held before an arrest warrant was issued against Abdul Quader.

Ahmed retired from the civil service on 8 July 2015.

Ahmed was appointed chairman of the Financial Reporting Council on 6 July 2017 by the government of Bangladesh. He was the first chairman of the council founded in 2016 through the passage of the Financial Reporting Act, 2015 in parliament. He expressed an in ability to operate the council due to lack of regulations. He highlighted the lack of trust people had on the financial institutions as a problem for Bangladesh. He wrote to the Bangladesh Securities and Exchange Commission to take action against Advent Pharmaceutical Limited over irregularities.

Ahmed is an independent director of Prime Bank and chairman of Prime Bank Investment Limited. He is a member of the risk management committee of Prime Bank.
