= Md. Nojibur Rahman =

- Born: 31 December 1960 (age 65)

Md. Nojibur Rahman is a retired civil servant and former chairman of the National Board of Revenue. He is the chairman of Capital Market Stabilization Fund. He is the former Principal Secretary of Prime Minister Sheikh Hasina.

== Early life ==
Rahman was born on 31 December 1960 in Sunamganj District, East Pakistan, Pakistan. Rahman completed his Bachelor of Social Science and Master of Social Science at the University of Dhaka in 1982 and 1984 respectively. He completed a second Masters at Australian National University in Development Administration in 1999.

== Career ==
Rahman joined the admin cadre of the Bangladesh Civil Service in 1982.

From 1991 to 1994, Rahman served at the Embassy of Bangladesh in Vietnam and Myanmar.

From 2009 to 2012, Rahman was the Economic Advisor at the Permanent Mission of Bangladesh to the United Nations.

Rahman was the secretary of the Statistics and Informatics Division at the Ministry of Planning from 2012 to 2014. He was the secretary of the Ministry of Environment, Forests and Climate Change.

From 12 January 2015 to 31 December 2017, Rahman was the chairman of the National Board of Revenue. He was succeeded by Md. Mosharraf Hossain Bhuiyan. He accused businessmen in Bangladesh of dodging taxes using bonded warehouses. He was appointed Principal Secretary to the Prime Minister Sheikh Hasina. He replaced Kamal Abdul Naser Chowdhury.

Rahman is an advisory board member of Cosmos Foundation. He was arrested after the fall of the Prime Minister Sheikh Hasina led Awami League government in mass protests. Talebur Rahman, Deputy Commissioner of the Dhaka Metropolitan Police, could not tell the media under which case or charge he had been detained. He and Md Aminul Islam Khan, former senior secretary of the Ministry of Home Affairs, were sent to jail in a case filed over the death of Shamim, a leader of Jubo Dal, in a clash between police and supporters of Awami League and the Bangladesh Nationalist Party in Dhaka on 28 October 2023.
