= Sheikh Abdul Awal =

Bangladeshi judge

Justice of the High Court Division of Bangladesh
- Incumbent
- Assumed office 30 October 1986

Personal details
- Born: July 4, 1960 (age 65)
- Profession: Judge

Sheikh Abdul Awal is a judge of the High Court Division, Supreme Court of Bangladesh of the Supreme Court of Bangladesh.

== Early life ==
Abdul Awal was born on 4 June 1960 to Sheikh Yousuff Ali and Saleha Begum. He completed a M.A., M.S.S., and law degree.

== Career ==
Abdul Awal became a lawyer of the District Courts on 30 October 1986. On 26 February 1989, Abdul Awal became a lawyer of the High Court Division of the Bangladesh Supreme Court.

Abdul Awal was appointed to the High Court Division as an additional judge on 23 August 2004. On 23 August 2006, Abdul Awal became a permanent judge of the High Court Division.

On 26 August 2008, Abdul Awal and Justice Tariq ul Hakim granted bail to Tarique Rahman, son of former Prime Minister Khaleda Zia, on an extortion case. On 8 October 2008 Abdul Awal and Justice AKM Fazlur Rahman ordered the government not to harass Saifur Rahman. On 17 October 2008, Abdul Awal and Justice Tariq ul Hakim granted bail to Lutfozzaman Babar, former Minister of Home Affairs, who had been sentenced to 17 years imprisonment for illegal possession of weapons by Judge Sayed Jahed Mansur.

On 8 March 2015, Abdul Awal and Justice Abu Taher Md. Saifur Rahman granted bail to an Islamic State recruit and son of a former judge of the High Court Division, Justice Abdus Salam Mamun.

On 3 March 2010, Abdul Awal and Justice Md Iman Ali declared the death penalty under the Women and Children Repression Prevention (Special) Act, 1995 illegal as it did not offer an alternate punishment besides the death penalty, which was against the constitution of Bangladesh. The verdict was delivered following a petition filed by Bangladesh Legal Aid and Services Trust and Sukur Ali, a convicted murder and rapist sentenced to death under the act.

On 21 July 2018, Abdul Awal and Justice Bhishmadev Chakrabortty found that seven employees of the court system had been involved in forging a bail order that facilitated the release of two suspected drug peddlers in Chittagong in April. Abdul Awal and Justice Bhishmadev Chakrabortty granted bail to Shahidul Alam.

Abdul Awal and Justice Bhishmadev Chakrabortty accepted the bail plea of two former inspector generals of police, Ashraful Huda and Shahudul Haque, on 21 January 2019 for their involvement in the 2004 Dhaka grenade attack.
