= Financial Reporting Act 2015 =

Act of the Bangladesh National Assembly

The Financial Reporting Act 2015 (known as FRA 2015) is an act of the parliament of Bangladesh. The act was passed on September 6, 2015, in order to follow the accountability and transparency of the financial reporting procedures in the country. On September 9, 2015, the act was officially published by the government of Bangladesh.

== Accountancy in Bangladesh ==
The Institute of Chartered Accountants of Bangladesh (ICAB) is the only governing body for regulating the country's chartered accountants, while the Institute of Cost and Management Accountants of Bangladesh (ICMAB) is for the cost and management accountants. In order to monitor the ICAB and ICMAB, the Financial Reporting Council (FRC), with 12 members, formed a body under the act to ensure accountability and performance among the chartered accountants and management accountants in Bangladesh. Moreover, the council will be a statutory body with expert members from various government bodies, institutions and professional groups.

== Functional objectives ==
The FRC is expected to be the watchdog body tasked with monitoring the functions of auditors, ensure transparency and accountability in accounting and the auditing of financial organisations, including various government, autonomous and non-government institutions. The stated mission of this institution is to be a model organization in Bangladesh with a view to ensuring quality in auditing, accounting and financial and non-financial reporting.

== Implications for auditors in Bangladesh ==
All auditors and audit firms must register with the Financial Reporting Council. Without registration, no auditor or audit firm will be able to provide auditing services to any entity related to the public interest. For registration, the auditor or audit firm needs to apply to the FRC. The FRC will review the application and will implore the registration pursuant to implement certain rules and guidelines. If any auditor or any audit firm violates any provisions or any of its rules and guidelines created by the act, the Financial Reporting Council may cancel or suspend the registration and may held financially accountable as well.
