= Syed Abu Kowser Md Dabirush-shan =

Bangladeshi judge

Justice of the High Court Division of Bangladesh

Personal details
- Profession: Judge

Syed Abu Kowser Md Dabirush-shan is a former judge of the High Court Division of Bangladesh Supreme Court.

== Career ==
In August 2010, Dabirush-shan and Justice Mohammad Anwarul Haque asked the government to explain why government allocating funds to member of parliament should not be declared illegal following a petition by Akkelpur Upazila chairman Anwarul Haque Bablu. He submitted his wealth statement to Chief Justice ABM Khairul Haque along with Justice Shahidul Islam following an appeal by the chief justice to the High Court Division Judges.

In February 2011, Dabirush-shan and Justice Mohammad Anwarul Haque gave a split verdict on a petition challenging the legality of the 1974 agreement regarding prisoner of war from the Bangladesh Liberation War signed by Bangladesh, India, and Pakistan. Mohammad Anwarul Haque dismissed the petition while Dabirush-shan sought an explanation from the government on why the treaty should not be declared illegal.
