= Secretary to the Government of Bangladesh =

Bangladeshi government official

- বাংলাদেশ সরকারের সচিব
- Government Seal of Bangladesh

- Flag of Bangladesh
- Government of Bangladesh
- Type: Civil Servant
- Status: Government Official
- Member of: Cabinet; Bangladesh Civil Service
- Reports to: Prime Minister; Cabinet of Bangladesh
- Seat: Bangladesh Secretariat, Dhaka
- Appointer: Prime Minister of Bangladesh
- Term length: Until the age of 59; Term contractually extendable
- Formation: 16 July 1971; 55 years ago
- Succession: 15th (on the Order of precedence in Bangladesh)
- Salary: ৳112080 (US$910) per month (incl. allowances)
- Website: bangladesh.gov.bd

Secretary to the Government of Bangladesh is a rank within the Bangladesh Civil Service under the Government of Bangladesh. The creation of this post is authorized by the government of Bangladesh, aligning with the country's administrative needs. The position is typically held by a career civil servant, predominantly from the Bangladesh Administrative Service, and represents a government official of considerable seniority.

In Bangladesh, the secretary is either from the Bangladesh Administrative Service or other cadres of the civil service upon attaining the required level of seniority and experience. Appointments and promotions to this position are made by the government of Bangladesh, often involving high-level decision-making bodies.

Within the structure of the Bangladeshi government, a secretary serves as the administrative head of a ministry or division. The role is comparable to that of the highest-ranking officials in other government branches and is recognized as such in the hierarchy of the Bangladesh Civil Service. The position of senior secretary, created in 2012, adds an additional tier of seniority, addressing the growing complexities and demands of modern governance in Bangladesh.

== History and background ==
The role of the secretary has evolved significantly since Bangladesh's independence in 1971. Initially shaped by the administrative traditions inherited from Pakistan and British India, the position has undergone various transformations, reflecting the changing political and administrative landscape of the country. Over the decades, secretaries have played instrumental roles in policy formulation, administration, and crisis management.

In 1998, the government decided to keep 75% of posts of deputy secretary and 70% of posts of joint secretary for the BCS administration and the remaining posts for the officers of other cadres.

== Appointment and tenure ==
The appointment of secretaries (including Senior Secretaries) is conducted by the Prime Minister of Bangladesh, based on seniority and merit within the Bangladesh Civil Service. The tenure of a secretary varies, often influenced by the government's administrative needs and the individual's performance.

== Role and responsibilities ==
- Policy Implementation: Secretaries are primarily responsible for implementing government policies within their respective ministries.
- Advisory Function: They advise ministers on policy matters, offering insights and recommendations based on their expertise and departmental feedback.
- Administrative Oversight: Overseeing the administrative functions of their ministries, they ensure efficiency and compliance with regulations.
- Interdepartmental Coordination: They facilitate coordination among various departments and ministries, essential for integrated policy implementation.
- International Representation: In some cases, Secretaries represent Bangladesh in international forums, particularly in matters related to their ministries.

It is primarily modeled after a hierarchical policy structure, following the British framework. The hierarchy is as follows:

Secretary General/Senior Secretary >> Secretary >> Additional Secretary >> Joint Secretary >> Deputy Secretary >> Senior Assistant Secretary >> Assistant Secretary.

Minister
Senior Secretary
Secretary
Additional Secretary
Joint Secretary
Deputy Secretary
Senior Assistant Secretary
Assistant Secretary

== Secretary to the Government of Bangladesh ==
- Cabinet Secretary of Bangladesh
- Principal Secretary to the Prime Minister of Bangladesh
- Principal Secretary to the President of Bangladesh
- Secretary to the President of Bangladesh
- Senior Secretary, Ministry of Public Administration (Bangladesh)
- Foreign Secretary of Bangladesh
- Home Secretary of Bangladesh
- Finance Secretary of Bangladesh
- Finance Division Secretary of Bangladesh
- Internal Resources Division Secretary of Bangladesh
- Economic Relations Division Secretary of Bangladesh
- Planning Division Secretary of Bangladesh
- Implementation Monitoring and Evaluation Division Secretary of Bangladesh
- General Economics Division Secretary of Bangladesh
- Road Transport and Highways Division Secretary of Bangladesh
- Bridges Division Secretary of Bangladesh
- Shipping Secretary of Bangladesh
- Civil Aviation and Tourism Secretary of Bangladesh
- Commerce Secretary of Bangladesh
- Industries Secretary of Bangladesh
- Energy and Mineral Resources Division Secretary of Bangladesh
- Power Secretary of Bangladesh
- Water Resources Secretary of Bangladesh
- Local Government Division Secretary of Bangladesh
- Rural Development and Cooperatives Division Secretary of Bangladesh
- Information Secretary of Bangladesh
- Information and Communication Technology Division Secretary of Bangladesh
- Posts and Telecommunications Division Secretary of Bangladesh
- Health Services Division Secretary of Bangladesh
- Health Education and Family Welfare Division Secretary of Bangladesh
- Secondary and Higher Education Division Secretary of Bangladesh
- Technical and Madrasah Education Division Secretary of Bangladesh
- Primary and Mass Education Secretary of Bangladesh
- Law Secretary of Bangladesh
- Legislative and Parliamentary Affairs Division Secretary of Bangladesh
- Defence Secretary of Bangladesh
- Religious Affairs Secretary of Bangladesh
- Disaster Management and Relief Secretary of Bangladesh
- Environment, Forest and Climate Change Secretary of Bangladesh
- Agriculture Secretary of Bangladesh
- Fisheries and Livestock Secretary of Bangladesh
- Food Secretary of Bangladesh
- Labour and Employment Secretary of Bangladesh
- Expatriates' Welfare and Overseas Employment Secretary of Bangladesh
- Social Welfare Secretary of Bangladesh
- Women and Children Affairs Secretary of Bangladesh
- Youth and Sports Secretary of Bangladesh
- Cultural Affairs Secretary of Bangladesh
- Liberation War Affairs Secretary of Bangladesh
- Land Secretary of Bangladesh
- Housing and Public Works Secretary of Bangladesh
- Textiles and Jute Secretary of Bangladesh
- Science and Technology Secretary of Bangladesh
- Railways Secretary of Bangladesh
