= Shree Shree Siddheswari Kalimandir =

Hindu temple in Bangladesh

Coordinates: 23.7440°N 90.4113°E

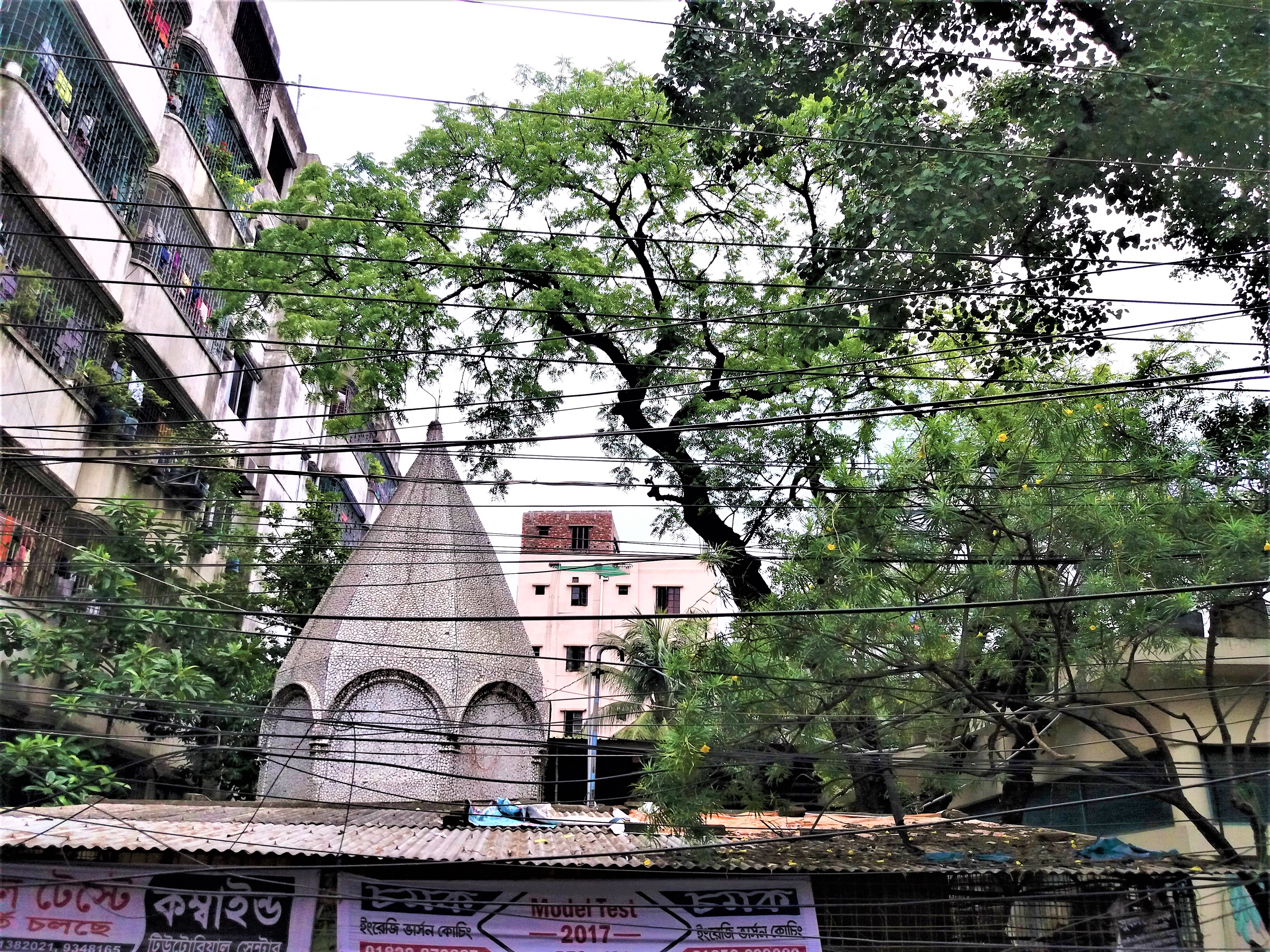
Shree Shree Siddheswari Kalimandir

The Siddheshwari Kali Mandir is a Hindu temple located at 14 Siddheshwari Lane in Dhaka, Bangladesh, established in the year 1441 CE. It is known that the name of Siddheshwari has come from the temple's name. It is estimated that someone called Chand Rai established this temple.

The centre of the temple has valuable statue of "Kali Ma" and the temple was extended with columns.

It is situated in a very congested area with narrow roads and crowded with people. Beside Siddheshwari the centre of Malibagh is situated. In the courtyard of the temple a red sandalwood ("Roktochondon") tree is standing. Near the temple there was an old pond and some old temples.

In the temple, festivals are organized. At the time of the Sharodio festival the people have placed Puja in front of the statue of Devi Ma for years. The people organize the grand festival of Durga Puja. On the tenth day of worshiping the Hindu people immerse the statue of Devi Ma into the pond. In this way the festivals goes on throughout the year.
