= Bangladesh Girl Guides Association =

- Seal of Bangladesh Girl Guides Association
- Country: Bangladesh
- Founded: 1973
- Membership: 49,975
- Affiliation: World Association of Girl Guides and Girl Scouts

The Bangladesh Girl Guides Association (Bengali: বাংলাদেশ গার্ল গাইডস অ্যাসোসিয়েশন) is the national Guiding organization of Bangladesh. It serves 49,975 members (as of 2003).

== History ==
Girlguiding in today's Bangladesh started in 1928 and became the East Pakistan Branch of the Pakistan Girl Guides Association in 1947. After Bangladesh's independence from Pakistan, the branch organization was reorganized into an independent national organization. The girls-only organization became a full member of the World Association of Girl Guides and Girl Scouts in 1973 and was incorporated on 3 October 1973 by section 2 of the Bangladesh Girl Guides Association Act, 1973 (No. XXXI), and that Act makes further provision in relation to the association.

== See also ==
- Bangladesh Scouts
