= Mohammad Abdur Rashid (judge) =

Bangladeshi judge (1942–2023)

- মোহাম্মদ আবদুর রশিদ

Justice of the High Court Division of Bangladesh
- In office 24 October 1999 – 26 January 2009

Personal details
- Born: 1942
- Died: 24 October 2023 (aged 81)
- Profession: Judge

Mohammad Abdur Rashid (1942 – 24 October 2023) was a Justice of the High Court Division of the Bangladesh Supreme Court. He was a former chairman of the Law Commission of Bangladesh.

== Early life ==
Rashid was born in 1942 in Chasara, Narayanganj District, East Bengal, British India. He completed a Bachelor of Science as well as a degree in law.

== Career ==
From 1968 to 1969, Rashid worked at the Mymensingh District bar.

Rashid became a lawyer of the High Court Division in 1976.

Rashid was appointed judge of the High Court Division on 24 October 1999.

Rashid retired from the High Court Division on 26 January 2009. He was appointed chairman of the Bangladesh Law Commission on 2 April 2009.

On 19 October 2010, Rashid resigned from the post of chairman of the Bangladesh Law Commission following a disagreement with the government. The Ministry of Law was unhappy with the activities of the commission.

Rashid asked the Supreme Court to rewrite the verdict on the 16th constitutional amendment to reduce the confusion created by the verdict declaring the act of parliament illegal. The act empowered the parliament to remove judges on certain grounds.

== Death ==
Rashid had a heart attack while watching a cricket match between Afghanistan and Pakistan. He was rushed to Monowara Hospital, then later moved to United Hospital, where he died on 24 October 2023 around 8:30 AM.
