= Monjur Morshed Chowdhury =

Bangladeshi civil servant

Manjur Morshed Chowdhury
- মনজুর মোর্শেদ চৌধুরী
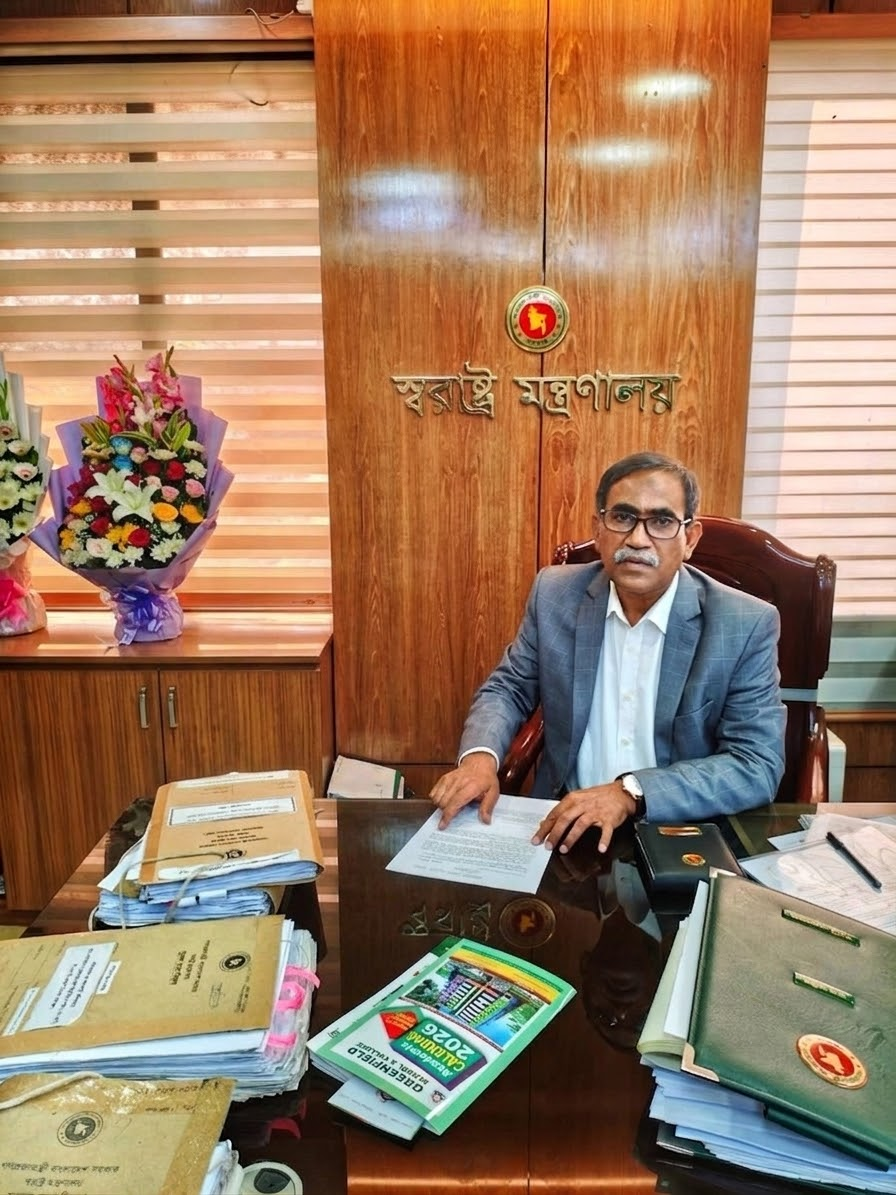

Secretary of the Ministry of Home Affairs
- Preceded by: Nasimul Gani

Personal details
- Born: 1 January 1963 (age 63) Sarangdia village, Sreepur Upazila, Magura District, Bangladesh
- Citizenship: Bangladesh
- Education: University of Dhaka

Manzur Morshed Chowdhury is a Bangladeshi civil servant and secretary of the Ministry of Home Affairs. He was appointed to the post on a one-year contractual basis in February 2026.

== Career ==
Chowdhury served as the Upazila Nirbahi Officer of Chokoria Upazila, Cox's Bazar District in 2004.

Chowdhury joined the Bangladesh Civil Service through the 8th Bangladesh Civil Service examination. During his career, he held various government positions, including deputy secretary of the Bangladesh Trade and Tariff Commission.

Following his retirement, Chowdhury was granted a retrospective promotion to the rank of secretary by the interim government, which recognised him as one of the 764 officials allegedly deprived of promotion during the tenure of the Awami League government.

In February 2026, Chowdhury was appointed secretary of the Ministry of Home Affairs on a one-year contract under Section 49 of the Government Service Act, 2018. He succeeded Nasimul Ghani, who had been appointed cabinet secretary. In February 2026, Chowdhury attended a meeting between Home Minister Salahuddin Ahmed and Chinese Ambassador Yao Wen on bilateral cooperation in security, cybercrime prevention, police training, trade, and investment. He was among 16 retired secretaries serving in Bangladesh's civil administration on a contractual basis.
