= Kamrul Islam Siddiqui =

Bangladeshi judge

Justice of the High Court Division of Bangladesh

Personal details
- Profession: Judge

Kamrul Islam Siddiqui was a judge of the High Court Division of Bangladesh Supreme Court.

== Biography ==
Siddiqui was born in 1950 in Dargahpur, Assasuni Upazila, Satkhira District, East Bengal, Pakistan.

On 28 August 2004, Siddiqui was appointed a judge of the High Court Division.

Siddiqui served in a special committee to investigate the separation of the judiciary and executive branch in 2007. In 2009, Siddiqui and Justice Mohammad Anwarul Haque refused to hear a petition related to cantonment residence of former Prime Minister Khaleda Zia as they had handled documents related to the property.

In July 2012, Siddiqui and Justice Abu Taher Md Saifur Rahman granted bail to Bangladesh Nationalist Party men accused of killing a bus driver in an arson attack.

On 29 May 2017, Siddiqui retired from the High Court Division.

Siddiqui died on 19 August 2018 at the Ibne Sina Hospital, Dhaka, Bangladesh.
