= Md. Ataur Rahman Khan =

Bangladeshi judge

Justice of the High Court Division of Bangladesh
- Incumbent
- Assumed office 5 March 1984 - December 2024

Personal details
- Born: 1 December 1957 (age 68)
- Profession: Judge

Md. Ataur Rahman Khan is a former judge of the High Court Division of Bangladesh Supreme Court.

== Early life ==
Khan was born on 1 December 1957.

== Career ==
Khan joined the district court as a lawyer on 5 March 1984.

On 27 December 1989, Khan became a lawyer of the High Court Division and on 6 June 1999 he became a lawyer of the Appellate Division.

Khan was appointed an additional judge of the High Court Division on 23 September 2004 and made a permanent judge of the division on 23 August 2006.

Khan was one of 19 High Court Division judges who opposed a High Court Division verdict asking the government to reinstate 10 judges. The ten judges appointment was not confirmed by the Bangladesh Nationalist Party government.

On 29 August 2008, Khan and Justice Nozrul Islam Chowdhury acquitted six of the accused in the Jail Killing case while confirming the jail sentence of one. The acquitted are A.K.M. Mohiuddin Ahmed, Abdul Hashem Mridha, Mohammad Bazlul Huda, Mohiuddin Ahmed, Marfat Ali Shah, Syed Faruque Rahman, and Sultan Shahriar Rashid Khan. The court confirmed the death sentence of Moslemuddin.

In 2009, Khan and Justice Nozrul Islam Chowdhury sentenced three people to life imprisonment for murder who had been acquitted by a lower court on 19 March 1989.

Khan and Justice AKM Asaduzzaman granted bail to Mahfuz Anam, editor of The Daily Star, in 10 cases in June 2016.

Khan and Justice Syed Muhammad Dastagir Husain halted the suspension order of M. A. Mannan, mayor of Gazipur, by the Local Government Division in July 2017. Khan and Justice Syed Muhammad Dastagir Husain also stayed the suspension orders of the mayors of Habiganj and Rajshahi. Khan and Justice Syed Muhammad Dastagir Husain summoned Health Secretary Sirajul Haque Khan for failure of the ministry to take action against pharmaceutical companies that produced toxic paracetamol leading to the death of 28 children in 2009. In November 2017, Khan and Justice Syed Muhammad Dastagir Husain declared the government travel ban on Syed Moazzem Hossain Alal, former member of parliament from the Bangladesh Nationalist Party, illegal. Khan and Justice Syed Muhammad Dastagir Husain asked the government to explain why closing Lakehead Grammar School for inspiring religious extremism should not be declared illegal as it harmed the students. It asked the government to take actions against individuals who have specific allegations against them and not the school as it would be detrimental to the education of the students.

In January 2018, Khan and Justice Syed Muhammad Dastagir Husain refused to hear a petition by lawyer Eunus Ali Akond to asking the government to explain why it had not appointed a successor to Chief Justice Surendra Kumar Sinha after he resigned.
