= Mohammad Bazlur Rahman =

Bangladeshi jurist

The Honourable Mohammad Bazlur Rahman

Justice of the High Court Division of Bangladesh

Personal details
- Died: 1 January 2017
- Profession: Justice

Mohammad Bazlur Rahman (died 2017) was a Justice of the Appellate Division of the Bangladesh Supreme Court.

== Career ==
Bazlur Rahman was appointed an Additional Judge of the High Court Division during the Awami League government along with twelve other judges. In 2001, the Bangladesh Nationalist Party came to power and refused to appoint the thirteen judges permanently despite the recommendation of the chief justice. Ten of those judges sued the government and secured a verdict in their favor from the Bangladesh Supreme Court asking the government to appoint them as permanent judges to the High Court Division. Bazlur Rahman was not part of the lawsuit and was not automatically appointed. On 8 May 2009, the newly elected Awami League government appointed Bazlur Rahman permanent Judge of the High Court Division.

In July 2015, Bazlur Rahman and Justice Md Ruhul Quddus ordered Bangladesh Police to take action when they receive complaints related to rent.

In February 2016, Bazlur Rahman was appointed Judge of the Appellate Division of the Bangladesh Supreme Court. Justice Mirza Hossain Haider and Justice Md Nizamul Huq were appointed to the Appellate Division of the Bangladesh Supreme Court at the same time.

== Death ==
Bazlur Rahman died on 1 January 2017.
