= Md Aminul Islam Khan =

Aminul Islam Khan

Senior Secretary Public Security Division, Ministry of Home Affairs
- In office 1 November 2022 – 31 March 2023
- Prime Minister: Sheikh Hasina
- Minister: Asaduzzaman Khan
- Preceded by: Akhtar Hossain
- Succeeded by: Mostafizur Rahman

Personal details
- Born: 1 April 1964 (age 62) Bakerganj, Barisal
- Education: University of Dhaka
- Known for: Senior Secretary

Md Aminul Islam Khan is a retired Bangladeshi civil servant and former senior secretary of the Ministry of Home Affairs. He was the secretary of the Ministry of Primary and Mass Education. He was arrested and charged with murder of the fall of the Sheikh Hasina led Awami League government.

== Career ==
Khan joined the Bangladesh Civil Service in 1986 as an admin cadre. He was the first secretary of the Embassy of Bangladesh in Qatar.

Khan had served as additional secretary of the Local Government Division.

Khan was the secretary of the Technical and Madrasah Education Division of the Ministry of Education in 2020 under Dipu Moni. He was appointed secretary of the Ministry of Liberation War Affairs in February 2020. He was previously additional secretary to the Ministry of Housing and Public Works. In March 2022, Khan was the director of SAARC and BIMSTEC wing of the Ministry of Foreign Affairs. On 13 February, he was appointed the secretary of the Ministry of Primary and Mass Education. He was promoted to senior secretary in May. He announced plans to open a hotline for education. In October, he was transferred to the Public Security Division of the Ministry of Home Affairs, responsible for law enforcement agencies in Bangladesh including Bangladesh Police. He replaced Md Akhter Hossain as secretary.

Khan was the senior secretary of the Public Security Division of the Ministry of Home Affairs. Khan sent Md Mahbub Hakim, additional deputy inspector general of Tourist Police, and Md Alamgir Alam, additional deputy inspector general of Criminal Investigation Department, to forced retirement in November 2022. In the last month he had sent three superintendents of police, Delwar Hossain Mia, Mirza Abdullahel Baqui, and Shahidullah Chowdhury to forced retirement. He sent Md Ali Hossain Fakir to forced retirement. He terminated Mizanur Rahman after he was arrested in a corruption case.

Khan was arrested after the fall of the Awami League government led by Prime Minister Sheikh Hasina in October 2024 from Banani. He was charged with the murder of Bangladesh Nationalist Party activist, Shamim, who died in 2023. He was sent to jail along with Md. Nojibur Rahman. Shamim had died after the rally of the Bangladesh Nationalist Party was attacked by Awami League and Bangladesh Police.
