= Mashuque Hosain Ahmed =

Bangladeshi judge

Justice of the High Court Division of Bangladesh

Personal details
- Profession: Judge

Mashuque Hosain Ahmed is a retired Justice of the High Court Division of the Bangladesh Supreme Court.

== Career ==
On 20 August 2006, Ahmed and Justice Joynul Abedin issued a stay order on the sale of state owned Ruplai Bank Limited following a petition filed by a shareholder of the bank.

Ahmed and Justice Khademul Islam Chowdhury expressed embarrassment to hear a case filed by Motiur Rahman Nizami against the Gatco corruption case in July 2008. Ahmed and Justice Khademul Islam Chowdhury on 21 July asked the caretaker government why its declaration of emergency on 11 January 2007 should not be declared illegal. Ahmed and Justice Khademul Islam Chowdhury stopped the proceedings of two corruption cases against former Prime Minister Sheikh Hasina.
