= Md. Emdadul Haque Azad =

Bangladeshi judge

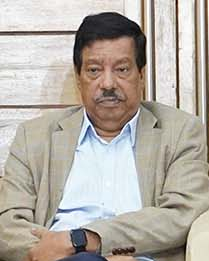
- Azad in 2025
- Born: 16 October 1956 (age 69)
- Education: University of Rajshahi
- Occupations: Lawyer, judge

Md. Emdadul Haque Azad is a retired judge of the High Court Division of the Bangladesh Supreme Court.

== Early life ==
Azad was born on 16 October 1956. He completed his law degree from the University of Rajshahi.

== Career ==
Azad started working in the district court of Rajshahi on 11 March 1985.

Azad became a lawyer in the High Court Division on 13 April 1987.

On 27 February 2001, Azad was appointed a lawyer of the Appellate Division.

Azad was appointed an additional judge of the High Court Division on 23 August 2004 and was made permanent judge on 23 August 2006.

Azad and Justice Sharif Uddin Chaklader stopped a scam case against Ali Asgar Lobi, former Bangladesh Nationalist Party member of parliament from Khulna-2, in July 2008. Azad and Justice Sharif Uddin Chaklader stopped the proceeding of a case against the wife of Khandaker Mosharraf Hossain, former minister of health in the Bangladesh Nationalist Party government. The bench did not grant bail to former prime minister Sheikh Hasina and ABM Mohiuddin Chowdhury, Awami League mayor of Chittagong. Azad was one of 19 judges who opposed a High Court order asking the government to reinstate 10 judges whose appointment was not confirmed by the Bangladesh Nationalist Party government. In August 2008, Azad and Justice Sharif Uddin Chaklader granted bail to former prime minister Khaleda Zia in the Barapukuria coal mine corruption case. The bench also halted the case against the wife of Sadeque Hossain Khoka, former Bangladesh Nationalist Party mayor of Dhaka. It granted bail to Ashraf Hossain, parliamentary whip of Bangladesh Nationalist Party, in a case filed by the Anti-Corruption Commission about the construction of the Gulistan Jatrabari flyover.

Azad and Justice AFM Abdur Rahman in November 2009 asked the minister of home affairs, Sahara Khatun, to explain extrajudicial killings by the Rapid Action Battalion.

He retired on 15 October 2023.

In November 2024, He was appointed as the director general (DG) of the Judicial Administration Training Institute (JATI).
