= Md. Akther Hossain =

Akhter Hossain

Chief Coordinator (SDG Affairs) Prime Minister's Office (Bangladesh)
- In office 7 February 2023 – 14 August 2024
- Prime Minister: Sheikh Hasina
- Preceded by: Zuena Aziz
- Succeeded by: Lamiya Morshed

Senior Secretary Public Security Division
- In office 12 January 2022 – 30 October 2022
- Preceded by: Mostafa Kamal Uddin
- Succeeded by: Md Aminul Islam Khan

Personal details
- Born: 31 October 1963 (age 62) Shariatpur District, Bangladesh
- Education: University of Dhaka
- Occupation: Government official, Secretary

Md. Akther Hossain is a retired civil servant and former senior secretary of the Public Security Division of the Ministry of Home Affairs. He was the principal coordinator for Sustainable Development Goals (SDG) affairs in the Prime Minister's Office when Sheikh Hasina was prime minister.

== Early life ==
Hossain was born in Shariatpur District. He completed his bachelor's degree in social sciences and master's degree in sociology at the University of Dhaka in 1983 and 1984, respectively. He has a law degree and an MBA.

== Career ==
Hossain joined the Bangladesh Civil Service on 15 February 1988 as an admin cadre. He served as an assistant commissioner, upazila magistrate and upazila nirbahi officer in Chandpur District, Cox's Bazar District, Jhalkathi District, and Feni District.

From July 1996 to June 2001, Hossain was senior assistant secretary and assistant private secretary to the minister of water resources, Abdur Razzak.

From March 2009 to September 2014, Hossain was the deputy secretary and joint secretary in the Local Government Division.

Hossain served as an additional secretary in the Ministry of Housing and Public Works.

Hossain was appointed secretary to the Ministry of Youth and Sports on 2 June 2021. He was promoted to senior secretary after his appointment. He served there until 11 January 2022.

On 12 January 2022, Hossain was appointed secretary of the Ministry of Home Affairs, Public Security Division. On 30 October 2022, the president of Bangladesh sent him into retirement.

In February 2023, Hossain was appointed the principal coordinator for Sustainable Development Goals. Hossain replaced Zuena Aziz, whose term ended in December 2022. In August 2024, Lamiya Morshed succeeded Hossain after the fall of the Sheikh Hasina-led Awami League government. The new government terminated his contract.
