= Judicial Administration Training Institute =

Bangladeshi judicial training agency

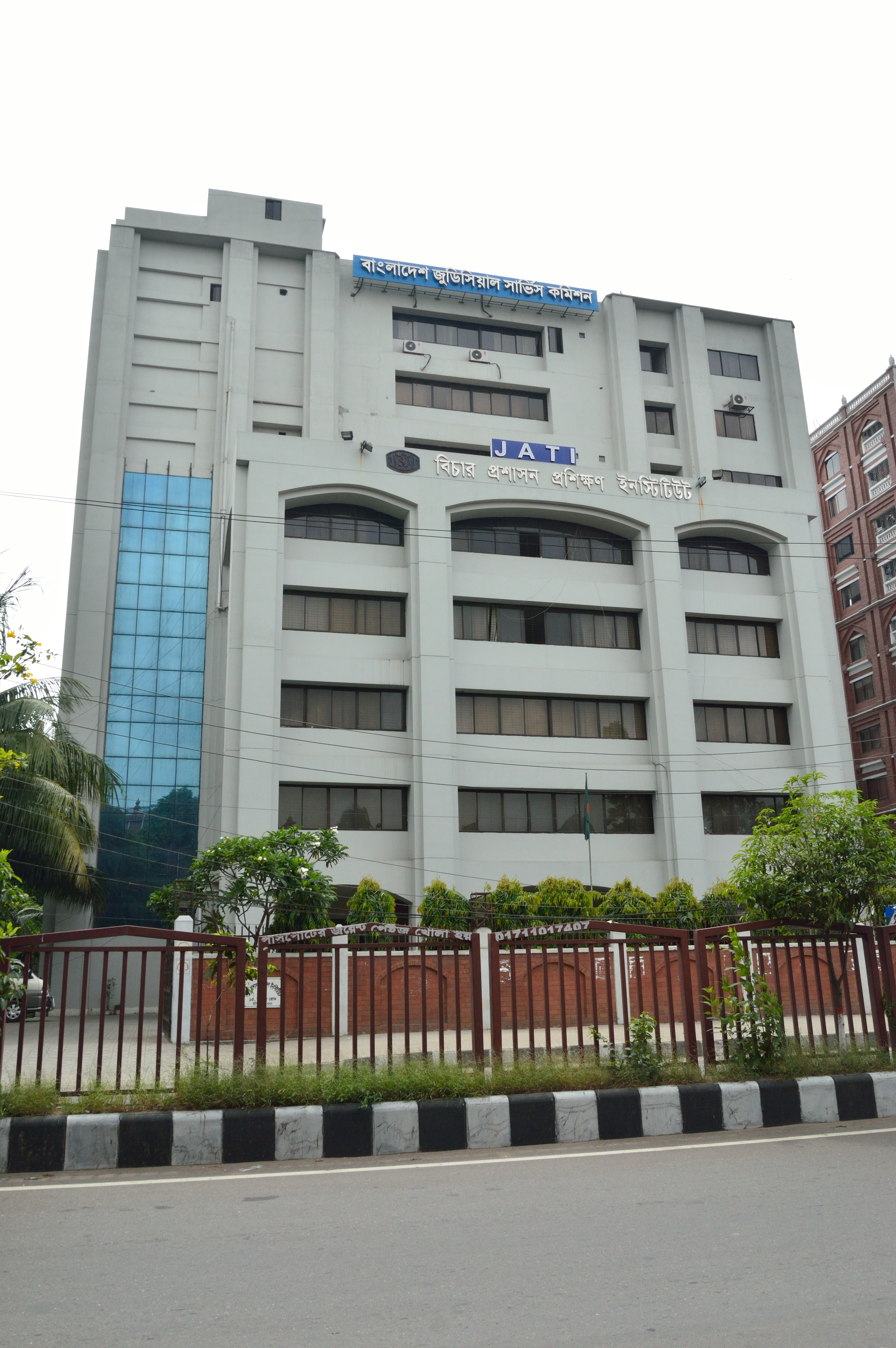
- Abbreviation: JATI
- Formation: 1996
- Headquarters: 15, College Road, Ramna, Dhaka, Bangladesh
- Region served: Bangladesh
- Official language: Bengali
- Director general: Md. Emdadul Haque Azad
- Website: Judicial Administration Training Institute

Judicial Administration Training Institute is a statutory organization of the Bangladesh government. It is a national training institute for judges and judicial magistrates in Bangladesh.

== History ==
Judicial Administration Training Institute was established in 1996 as a statutory organization. It was established through the Judicial Administration Training Institute Act 1995. The purpose of the institute is to train judges, magistrates and other judicial officers.
