= Sheikh Rezowan Ali =

Bangladeshi judge

Justice of the High Court Division of Bangladesh

Personal details
- Profession: Judge

Sheikh Rezowan Ali is a retired judge of the High Court Division of the Bangladesh Supreme Court.

== Career ==
In 2000, as the metropolitan sessions judge, Ali was the judge of the Humayun Zahir murder case, who was a director of the United Commercial Bank Limited which was forcibly taken over by Akhtaruzzaman Chowdhury Babu.

On 6 November 2002, Ali and Justice Gour Gopal Saha issued a verdict which stated courts must record the reason for allowing additional evidence in an ongoing trial. On 3 July 2003, Ali was made a permanent judge of the High Court Division by President Iajuddin Ahmed.

In September 2008, Ali and Justice Md Rais Uddin rejected the bail petition of former prime minister Sheikh Hasina in an extortion case filed by Noor Ali, a businessman, following a petition by her lawyer Sheikh Fazle Noor Taposh. The bail petition was contested by the government of Bangladesh.

In January 2009, Ali and Justice Md Rais Uddin asked law enforcement agencies to not harass prime minister Sheikh Hasina in the Niko corruption case and the barge-mounted power plant corruption case.

In May 2010, Ali and Justice Habibul Gani granted bail to Mehnaz Rashid, daughter of Lieutenant Colonel Khandaker Abdur Rashid, in a case filed over a bomb attack on Sheikh Fazle Noor Taposh. In July 2010, Ali and Ali and Justice Md Habibul Gani halted the murder trial against 11, including justice Md. Ruhul Quddus, over the 1988 murder of a Islami Chhatra Shibir activist at the University of Rajshahi.

In June 2011, Ali and Justice Muhammad Abdul Hafiz granted bail to Abdus Salam Pintu and Nasiruddin Ahmed Pintu in a case filed over the 2001 Narayanganj bombing.
