= Syed Mohammad Dastagir Husain =

Bangladeshi Judge

Justice of the High Court Division of Bangladesh
- In office 3 July 2003 – 17 September 2018

Personal details
- Profession: Judge

Syed Mohammad Dastagir Husain is a Bangladeshi lawyer and former justice of the High Court Division of Bangladesh Supreme Court.

== Early life ==
Husain's father, Syed A. B. Mahmud Hossain, was the second chief justice of Bangladesh.

== Career ==
On 6 August 2006, Husain issued an order on extrajudicial killings and asked the Rapid Action Battalion and Bangladesh Police why they should not be directed to protect the lives of people in their custody.

Husain and 18 other judges opposed a High Court Division order that asked the government to make 10 judges position permanent who were denied by the Bangladesh Nationalist Party government. Husain was the only judge out the 19 who was appointed by an Awami League government while the rest were appointed by the Bangladesh Nationalist Party.

On 29 October 2009, Husain and Justice Md Rais Uddin granted bail AKM Rafiqul Islam, officer in-charge of Motijheel Police Station in the 2005 murder case of Kamrul Islam Momin.

On 17 January 2016, Husain and Justice AKM Shahidul Huq issued an order to investigate torture of an assistant director of Bangladesh Bank, Golam Rabbi by Masud Shikder, sub-inspector of Mohammadpur Police Station in order to extort money from the bank official. Husain and Justice AKM Shahidul Huq ordered the halting of 72 cases against Mahfuz Anam, the editor of The Daily Star on 11 April 2016. On 13 April, Husain and Justice AKM Shahidul Huq declared mandatory registration biometric data for SIM cards to be legal.

On 6 September 2016, Husain told an audience in the University of Rajshahi that the government was ignoring the Chief Justice Surendra Kumar Sinha request to create a separate secretariat for the Supreme Court and that was harming the ability of the court to be independent.

Husain and Justice Md Ataur Rahman Khan issued an order in August 2017 halting the reappointment of Abu Saleh Sheikh Mohammad Zahirul Haque as law secretary.

On 29 January 2018, Husain and Justice Md Ataur Rahman Khan, transferred the officer in charge of Lohagara Police Station for issuing an arrest warrant against a suspect already in custody.
