= Md. Rais Uddin =

Bangladeshi judge

Justice of the High Court Division of Bangladesh
- Incumbent
- Assumed office 22 August 1981

Personal details
- Born: July 30, 1956 (age 69)
- Profession: Judge

Md. Rais Uddin is a judge of the High Court Division of Bangladesh Supreme Court.

== Early life ==
Rais was born on 30 July 1956.

== Career ==
After Rais competed his law degree he joined the district court as a lawyer on 22 August 1981.

On 3 November 1983, Rais became a lawyer of the High Court Division.

On 23 August 2004, Rais was appointed an additional judge of the High Court Division. He was made a permanent judge of the division on 23 August 2006.

Rais was one of 19 judges who opposed a High Court order in July 2008 that called on the government to reinstate 10 judges of the high court whose appointment was not confirmed by Bangladesh Nationalist Party government. In October 2008, Rais and Justice Sheikh Rezowan Ali issued an order asking the government to not harass former Prime Minister Sheikh Hasina. They also rejected her bail petition because she was outside of the country at that time. In July 2009, Rais and Justice Syed Muhammad Dastagir Husain asked the government to explain why it should not grant bails to two officers of National Security Intelligence, Major General Rezzakul Haider Chowdhury and Wing Commander Sahab Uddin. Rais and Justice Syed Muhammad Dastagir Husain also squashed the corruption conviction of Mohiuddin Khan Alamgir. Rais and Justice Syed Muhammad Dastagir Husain granted bail to Giasuddin Al Mamun in October 2009. Rais and Justice Syed Muhammad Dastagir Husain asked the government to explain why contempt of court charges should not be started against the government for its failure to provide medical treatment to Abdus Salam Pintu, former Bangladesh Nationalist Party minister in jail.

In April, Rais asked eight individuals accused in the case over the 1996 Bangladesh share market scam to surrender. Rais stayed the conviction of Sabira Sultana, the Bangladesh Nationalist Party nominee for Jessore-2, which had been denied by the courts twice and paved the way for her to contest the upcoming national elections in December 2018. She is the former chairperson of Jhikargachha Upazila who had been convicted on corruption charges.
