= Nazrul Islam Chowdhury (judge) =

Bangladeshi judge

Justice of the High Court Division of Bangladesh
- Incumbent
- Assumed office 2001

Chairman of the International Crimes Tribunal-2
- Incumbent
- Assumed office 8 May 2025

Personal details
- Profession: Judge

Nazrul Islam Chowdhury is a retired judge of the High Court Division of the Bangladesh Supreme Court. He is currently the chairman of the International Crimes Tribunal-2.

== Career ==
In 2001, Chowdhury was appointed an additional judge of the High Court Division.

In January 2003, Chowdhury and Justice M A Aziz declared the detention of Tofail Ahmed, a politician of the Awami League, who was arrested in December 2002. On 3 July 2003, Chowdhury was appointed a permanent judge of the High Court Division.

In May 2004, the Chief Justice nominated Chowdhury to the selection committee formed to pick the commissioner of the Anti-Corruption Commission.

In September 2007, Chowdhury and Justice Ataur Rahman Khan rejected an appeal to quash the MiG-29 fighter planes corruption case against former prime minister Sheikh Hasina.

In August 2011, Chowdhury and Justice Anwarul Haque expressed embarrassment and unwillingness to hear the bail hearing in a case against 13 lawyers. The lawyers were accused of preventing police from discharging their duties. The lawyers had created chaos in a court room after a judge observed in a hearing against Fazlul Haque Amini that some comments of former prime minister Khaleda Zia was seditious and quested her patriotism.

In February 2016, Chowdhury stopped representing Mir Quasem Ali, a Bangladesh Jamaat-e-Islami politician who had been accused of committing war crimes in the Bangladesh Liberation War.
