= Financial Reporting Council Bangladesh =

- Formation: 2016
- Headquarters: Dhaka, Bangladesh
- Region served: Bangladesh
- Official language: Bengali
- Website: www.frc.gov.bd

The Financial Reporting Council Bangladesh (Bengali: ফইনান্সিয়াল রিপোর্টিং কাউন্সিল) is a Bangladesh government regulatory agency responsible for regulating financial reporting, auditing and audit firms.

== History ==
The Financial Reporting Council Bangladesh was established on 19 April 2016 as per Financial Reporting Act, 2015 as an independent regulatory agency. The agency is controlled by 12 member-governing body which has representatives from the government, Bangladesh Bank, Bangladesh Securities and Exchange Commission, Federation of Bangladesh Chambers of Commerce & Industries, professional accountants association and academia. It was created through the passage of Financial Reporting Act 2015 in the parliament of Bangladesh.

In 2020 it signed agreements with International Valuation Standards Council, International Federation of Accountants, and IFRS Foundation.
