= Ramakrishna Mission Temple, Dhaka =

Hindu temple in Dhaka, Bangladesh

Coordinates: 23.7209°N 90.4236°E

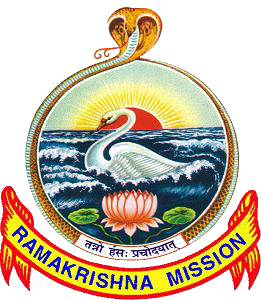
- Emblem

- Location within Bangladesh

Religion
- Affiliation: Hinduism

Location
- Location: Dhaka
- Country: Bangladesh
- Interactive map of Ramakrishna Mission Temple, Dhaka

Website
- dhakarkmm.org

Ramakrishna Mission Temple, Dhaka is a historically significant architectural monument situated on R. K Mission Road in the Motijheel area in Dhaka, Bangladesh. The temple Ramakrishna Mission is an architecture which was founded by Swami Vivekananda in 1899 and the Ramakrishna Math (temple) was founded by Swami Brahmananda and Swami Premananda.

== History ==
In 1916 Swami Brahmananda and Swami Premananda visited to Dhaka. On 13 February 1916, Swami Brahamananda and Swami Permananda laid the foundation of Ramakrishna Math and Ramakrishna Mission, respectively. After 8 months, on 24 October the first Governor of the East Bengal, Lord Carmichael, inaugurated the opening ceremony of the medical service centre. In March of this year, Dhaka Ramakrishna Mission received the affiliation of the Headquarters at Belur.

The Ramakrishna Mission Authority of Belur appointed the local executive committee to start renovation work as after 85 years of use, the temple had become dilapidated. The main construction work began in 2000. In 2015, Prime Minister of India, Narendra Modi visited them temple.

== Architectural significance ==
The temple has a capacity of sitting for about 600 persons. It has 5 entrances. The shrine room with hexagonal view has been made in such a way that devotees can see the shrine from every side of the temple except back. The main dome is surrounding by 6 small domes with the symbols of 6 religions in their pinnacles, presenting the universality of Ramakrishna Order on the basis of Sri Ramakrishna's realization "as many faiths so many paths."

== Sources ==
- Uddipon (Page no- 185- 230)published by: PrincipalRamakrishna Math and Ramakrishna Mission
