= Mirza Hussain Haider =

Bangladeshi Judge

Supreme Court of Bangladesh

Personal details
- Born: 1 March 1954 (age 72) Bakshiganj, Jamalpur District
- Occupation: Judge, lawyer

Mirza Hussain Haider (Bengali: মির্জা হুসেন হায়দার) is a former justice of the Appellate Division of the Bangladesh Supreme Court.

== Early life ==
Haider was born on 1 March 1954 in Bakshiganj, Jamalpur District, East Bengal, Pakistan. He completed his bachelor's degree and master's in law from the University of Dhaka.

== Career ==
Haider started working as a lawyer in the district court in 1979.

In 1981, Haider became a lawyer in the High Court Division.

Haider worked as a lawyer in the Appellate Division in 1999.

On 3 July 2001, Haider was appointed an additional judge on the High Court Division of Bangladesh Supreme Court. His appointment was confirmed three years later in 2003 as a permanent judge of the division.

Haider and Justice Borhan Uddin issued an order for Abul Hasnat Abdullah, former chief whip, to surrender before the court in a tax evasion case in 2009.

On 22 March 2012, Haider and Justice Muhammad Khurshid Alam Sarkar ordered the government to block anti-Islam content on Facebook.

In 2016, Haider was the second most senior judge in the High Court Division. Haider was promoted to the Appellate Division of the Bangladesh Supreme Court on 8 February 2016.

In August 2019, Haider's residence in Bakshiganj was attacked and damaged by a local Awami League politician.

Haider retired in February 2021. During his farewell speech he questioned the neutrality and independence of the judiciary in Bangladesh.
