= Md Abdul Hye =

Bangladeshi judge (died 2021)

Justice of the High Court Division of Bangladesh

Personal details
- Died: 20 February 2021
- Profession: Judge

Md Abdul Hye (died 20 February 2021) was a Bangladeshi judge who was the chairman of the Labour Appeal Tribunal and a retired Justice of the High Court Division of the Bangladesh Supreme Court.

== Career ==
In December 2008, Abdul Hye and Justice ABM Khairul Haque declared provisions related to bail under the Emergency Powers Ordinance, 2007 and Emergency Power Rules, 2007 illegal.

In January 2009, Abdul Hye and Justice ABM Khairul Haque stopped the corruption case against Mosaddek Ali Falu, former member of parliament.

In March 2010, Abdul Hye and Justice Afzal Hossain Ahmed granted bail to A Rouf Chowdhury, chairman of RanksTel in a case over illegal VoIP. In December, Abdul Hye and Justice Md Mifta Uddin Choudhury ordered the police to interrogate Saiful Islam Duke, nephew of former Prime Minister Khaleda Zia, at jail gate or in front of his lawyers in custody following a petition by his father Rafiqul Islam.

In January 2011, Abdul Hye and Justice Md Abdur Razzaque acquitted Mostafa Rashidi Suja, former Awami League member of parliament, and his wife in a corruption case. In February 2011, seven judges of the Bangladesh High Court threatened to go on strike or resign if Md Shamsul Huda, and Justice Md Momtazuddin Ahmed were not appointed to the Appellate Division. The seven judges were Justice AHM Shamsuddin Chowdhury Manik, Justice Faruque Ahmed, Justice Md Nizamul Huq, Justice Md Abdul Hye, Justice Md Shamsul Huda, Justice Md Momtazuddin Ahmed, and Justice Marzi-ul Huq. They had argued that the two judges were harmed by not having their appointment confirmed by the Bangladesh Nationalist Party government.

In April 2014, Abdul Hye and Justice Krishna Debnath acquitted four members of Islami Chhatra Shibir in a case over the death of eight Bangladesh Chhatra League activists in July 2000.

After Abdul Hye retired from the High Court Division, he was appointed chairman of the Labour Appeal Tribunal on 19 March 2017.

== Death ==
Abdul Hye died on 20 February 2021.
