= 2000 Chittagong massacre =

Event in Bangladesh

2000 Chittagong massacre refers to the murder of eight people by the Bangladesh Islami Chhatra Shibir (the student wing of the Bangladesh Jamaat-e-Islami) who had fired on a microbus carrying an organization Bangladesh Chhatra League activists killing six in the microbus and one passer-by.

== Background ==
Bangladesh Islami Chhatra Shibir is the student wing of the Bangladesh Jamaat-e-Islami. Bangladesh Chhatra League is the student wing of the Awami League. Shibir Controlled politics in Chittagong from the dorm of Chittagong College where it was believed the murder was planned. IHS Jane's Global Terrorism and Insurgency Attack Index placed Shibir third on the list of non-state armed group in 2013.

== Incident ==
On the morning of 12 July 2000, Bangladesh Islami Chhatra Shibir activist fired on a microbus carrying Bangladesh Chhatra League activists in Bahodderhat, Chittagong. They killed seven in the bus, six Bangladesh Chhatra League activists and the bus drive, and one driver of a nearby auto rickshaw. The reason for the targeted killing was to control a newly constructed campus of the Chittagong Commercial Institute.

== Trial ==
Abdul Kader Khan, assistant superintendent of police of the Criminal Investigation Department, filed murder charges against 22 activists of Bangladesh Islami Chhatra Shibir on 17 January 2001 and framed on 17 June 2002. In March 2008, Court of Second Additional Metropolitan Sessions Judge of Chittagong Ekramul Haq Chowdhury sentenced four to death and three to life imprisonment, all activists of Islami Chhatra Shibir.

In April 2014, the four capital convictions in the case were reversed on appeal by High Court Division judges Md Abdul Hye and Krishna Debnath due to lack of eyewitnesses although the convictions which resulted in life imprisonment were apparently left untouched. Deputy Attorney General Moniruzzaman Rubel said the state would appeal against the High Court verdict that acquitted the four.

Gittu Nasir, a criminal cadre of Islami Chhatra Shibir, who was believed to be involved in the Murder of Gopal Krishna Muhuri was detained in February 2005. He was killed in a shootout with Rapid Action Battalion the following month. Gittu Nasir was a follower of Shibir Nasir, who was released from prison in August 2024 after the resignation of Sheikh Hasina.
