= Md. Miftah Uddin Choudhury =

Judge on the Bangladesh Supreme Court

Justice of the High Court Division of Bangladesh
- In office 27 August 2003 – 25 June 2022

Personal details
- Profession: Judge

Justice Md. Miftah Uddin Choudhury was a judge on the High Court Division of Bangladesh Supreme Court.

== Early life ==
Choudhury was born on 26 July 1955. He completed his bachelor's degree and master's in law.

== Career ==
Choudhury joined the district court on 21 August 1981 as a lawyer.

Choudhury became a lawyer of the High Court Division of Bangladesh Supreme Court on 24 January 1984.

On 30 October 2001, Choudhury became a lawyer of the Appellate Division of the Bangladesh Supreme Court.

On 27 August 2003, Choudhury was appointed an additional judge of the High Court Division.

Choudhury was made a permanent judge of the High Court Division on 27 August 2005.

On 11 November 2009, Choudhury and Justice Abu Bakar Siddiquee ordered the government to appoint 197 candidates of the 27th Bangladesh Civil Service examinations whose appointment had been stopped by the previous caretaker government on grounds that there had been irregularities in the recruitment.

On 25 January 2011, Choudhury asked the government to explain why the dismissal of Brigadier General Abdullahil Amaan Azmi, son of Bangladesh Jamaat-e-Islami chief Ghulam Azam, from the Bangladesh Army on 23 June 2009 would not be declared illegal. Justice Jahangir Hossain who sat in the bench dissented with the verdict. This led the Chief Justice Md. Muzammel Hossain to create a new bench to hear the case led by Justice Jahangir Hossain who then issued a verdict which upheld the government order dismissing Brigadier General Abdullahil Amaan Azmi.

On 1 October 2015, Choudhury and Justice Kazi Md Ejarul Haque Akondo rejected a petition by Awami League member of parliament Abdur Rahman Bodi challenging the legality of a corruption case filed against him by the Anti Corruption Commission.

Choudhury and Justice ANM Bashir Ullah in April 2017 stayed proceedings against former prime minister Khaleda Zia in four "sabotage" cases. In June 2017, Choudhury and Justice ANM Bashir Ullah detained Abdul Baset Majumder, vice-chairman of Bangladesh Bar Council and an Awami League leader, for a few hours after he allegedly misheard the judge and got the police to release a suspect from custody. The suspect, Abdul Kuddus, was detained in an attempted murder case and was an Awami League politician in Chittagong. In June, Choudhury and Justice ANM Bashir Ullah granted bail to Khairul Kabir Khokon, Bangladesh Nationalist Party politician, in seven cases for extortion, arson, and vandalism. In October 2017, Choudhury and Justice Zafar Ahmed halting proceedings against Mirza Fakhrul Islam Alamgir, general secretary of the Bangladesh Nationalist Party, in a vandalism case from 2015. On 28 November 2017, Choudhury and Justice Abu Taher Md Saifur Rahman granted bail to professor of law at the University of Dhaka Asif Nazrul in a defamation and a ICT case.

On 7 January 2018, Choudhury and Justice Abu Taher Md Saifur Rahman granted bail to Mahmudur Rahman, editor of Amar Desh, in 10 cases.

Rajdhani Unnayan Kartripakkha on 17 December 2004 allocated a plot in the third phase of Uttara Model Town (sector 15) to Choudhury. Rajdhani Unnayan Kartripakkha cancelled the allocation which was halted by a High Court bench of Justice Md. Iqbal Kabir and Justice Syed Refaat Ahmed who ordered Rajdhani Unnayan Kartripakkha to accept his payments in August 2019.

Choudhury in a verdict on 3 September 2020, confirmed the rights of Hindu widow to the properties of their late husbands.

He retired on 25 July 2022.
