= Marzi-ul Huq =

Bangladeshi judge

Justice of the High Court Division of Bangladesh

Personal details
- Profession: Judge

Marzi-ul Huq was a Justice of the High Court Division of the Bangladesh Supreme Court.

== Career ==
In November 2001, Marzi-ul Huq and Justice Md Abdul Matin issued an order asking the government to protect the Hindu community, a religious minority, and sought clarification regarding the government's role following a petition by the Ain-O-Salish Kendra. The order came following the victory of Bangladesh Nationalist Party in the 2001 Bangladeshi general election and start of the 2001 Bangladesh post-election violence.

Marzi-ul Huq was appointed additional Judge of the High Court Division near the end of the Awami League government term in 2001. Despite the recommendation of the chief justice, Marzi-ul Huq and other judges appointed by the Awami League government were not made permanent judges of the High Court Division by the newly elected Bangladesh Nationalist Party breaking tradition. Ten of the judges, including Marzi-ul Huq, filed an appeal with the Court Division ordered the government to make the ten permanent judges with seniority in 2008. The judgement was confirmed by the Appellate Division, a five judge bench led by Chief Justice MM Ruhul Amin following an appeal by 19 sitting judges of the High Court Division who were concerned about their promotions if the judges were reinstated with seniority. On 26 March 2009, he was sworn in as a permanent judge of the High Court Division.

In May 2009, Marzi-ul Huq and Justice MA Wahhab Mian warned Dhaka Metropolitan Sessions Judge ANM Bashirullah for his comments on the Bangladesh High Court. Bashirullah apolozied to the court. Marzi-ul Huq and Justice MA Wahhab Miah granted bail to M Morshed Khan and Anwar Hossain Manju.

In February 2011, seven judges of the Bangladesh High Court threatened to go to strike or resign if Md Shamsul Huda, and Justice Md Momtazuddin Ahmed were not appointed to the Appellate Division. The seven judges were Justice AHM Shamsuddin Chowdhury Manik, Justice Faruque Ahmed, Justice Md Nizamul Huq, Justice Md Abdul Hye, Justice Md Shamsul Huda, Md Momtazuddin Ahmed, and Justice Marzi-ul Huq. They had argued that the two judges were harmed by not having their appointment confirmed by the Bangladesh Nationalist Party government.

Marzi-ul Huq retired on 9 September 2012.

== Personal life ==
Marzi-ul Huq's sister was AN Mahfuza Khatun Baby Moudud, a notable journalist.

== Death ==
Marzi-ul Huq died on 19 October 2013 in Square Hospital, Dhaka, Bangladesh following a heart attack.
