= Md Shamsul Huda Manik =

Bangladeshi judge (died 2025)

Md Shamsul Huda

Justice of the High Court Division of Bangladesh

Personal details
- Died: 26 May 2025
- Profession: Judge

Md Shamsul Huda Manik (died 26 May 2025) was a Bangladeshi judge who was a justice of the Appellate Division of the Supreme Court. He formerly served in the High Court Division of the Bangladesh Supreme Court.

== Career ==
In a verdict by the Bangladesh High Court, which was upheld by the Bangladesh Supreme Court, the government of Bangladesh was asked to reappoint 10 judges to the High Court Division whose appointment was not confirmed by the Bangladesh Nationalist Party despite the recommendation of the chief justice, as they were appointed to the court by the last Awami League government. The ten judges included Shamsul Huda. The verdict was opposed by 19 judges of the High Court Division.

In December 2009, Shamsul Huda and Justice Nazmun Ara Sultana ordered the government to include 159 family planning officers in the cadre service with appropriate seniority.

Shamsul Huda and Justice Abu Bakar Siddiquee scrapped a three-year prison term for AKM Shamim Osman, former Awami League member of parliament, in a corruption case. In May, Shamsul Huda and Justice Abu Bakar Siddiquee asked Mockbul Hossain, former Awami League member of parliament, to surrender to the trial court related to a corruption case. Huda and Justice Abu Bakar Siddiquee quashed the frigate purchase corruption case against Prime Minister Sheikh Hasina filed in 2003 by the Bureau of Anti Corruption. Shamsul Huda and Justice Abu Bakar Siddiquee quashed the Niko corruption case against Prime Minister Sheikh Hasina filed in 2007 by the Anti-Corruption Commission. Shamsul Huda and Justice Abu Bakar Siddiquee quashed the Bangladesh Export Processing Zones Authority corruption case against Prime Minister Sheikh Hasina filed in 2001 by the Bureau of Anti-Corruption related to the appointment of lobbyists in Washington, D.C., for the authority. Shamsul Huda and Justice Abu Bakar Siddiquee quashed a case against Sheikh Selim, former Awami League member of parliament and cousin of Prime Minister Sheikh Hasina, for attacking a motorcade of former prime minister Khaleda Zia in 2001 in Keraniganj. Shamsul Huda and Justice Abu Bakar Siddiquee granted bail to Sheikh Helal, former Awami League member of parliament and cousin of Prime Minister Sheikh Hasina, and his wife in two cases related to corruption and extortion. In June 2010, Shamsul Huda and Justice Abu Bakar Siddiquee granted anticipatory bail to Ahmed Akbar Sobhan, chairman of Bashundhara Group, in seven criminal cases.

In February 2011, seven judges of the Bangladesh High Court threatened to go on strike or resign if Shamsul Huda and Justice Md Momtazuddin Ahmed were not appointed to the Appellate Division. The seven judges were Justice AHM Shamsuddin Chowdhury Manik, Justice Faruque Ahmed, Justice Md Nizamul Huq, Justice Md Abdul Hye, Justice Md Shamsul Huda, Md Momtazuddin Ahmed, and Justice Marzi-ul Huq. They had argued that the two judges were harmed by not having their appointment confirmed by the Bangladesh Nationalist Party government.

In August 2012, Shamsul Huda upheld a High Court order that halted the Hallmark Group's plan to build an industrial park in Savar following a petition by Paribesh Bachao Andolan.

Huda was the President of the president of Gopalganj District Bar Association. He served as the General Secretary of the Gopalganj District Awami League and Chairman of the Gopalganj District Council.

== Personal life and death ==
In January 2021, Shamsul Huda filed a general diary with Shahbagh police station against his daughter Tuhin Sultana Topu after she appeared on a Facebook page called Mojar TV and claimed to be destitute. His daughter, Shahin Sultana Shanta, had filed an assault case against four police officers, including former deputy commissioner of the Dhaka Metropolitan Police Kohinoor Mian and DIG Md Mazharul Haque, for assaulting her in March 2006 during a strike by the opposition Awami League. She was pregnant at the time and had a miscarriage as a result. The case was dismissed in September 2024.

== Death ==
Huda died on 26 May 2025.
