= Faruque Ahmed =

Bangladeshi judge

The Honourable Faruque Ahmed

Justice of the High Court Division of Bangladesh

Personal details
- Profession: Judge

Faruque Ahmed is a retired judge of the High Court Division of the Bangladesh Supreme Court.

== Career ==
In February 2001, Ahmed was appointed as an additional judge of the High Court Division by the Awami League government near the end of its term. The new Bangladesh Nationalist Party government did not appoint him and 8 other judges as permanent judges.

In a verdict by the Bangladesh High Court, which was upheld by Bangladesh Supreme Court, the government of Bangladesh was asked to reappointed 10 judges, including Ahmed, to the High Court Division whose appointed was not confirmed by the Bangladesh Nationalist Party despite the recommendation of the chief justice as they were appointed to the court by the last Awami League government. The verdict was opposed by 19 judges of the High Court Division. He was appointed a permanent judge of the High Court Division in February 2011.

In February 2011, seven judges of the Bangladesh High Court threatened to go to strike or resign if Md Shamsul Huda, and Justice Md Momtazuddin Ahmed were not appointed to the Appellate Division. The seven judges were Justice AHM Shamsuddin Chowdhury Manik, Justice Faruque Ahmed, Justice Md Nizamul Huq, Justice Md Abdul Hye, Justice Md Shamsul Huda, Md Momtazuddin Ahmed, and Justice Marzi-ul Huq. They had argued that the two judges were harmed by not having their appointment confirmed by the Bangladesh Nationalist Party government.
