= Mohammad Atikullah Khan Masud =

Bangladeshi newspaper editor (1951–2021)

- Born: 29 August 1951; Medini Mandal, Munshiganj District, East Bengal, Pakistan
- Died: 22 March 2021 (aged 69); Dhaka, Bangladesh
- Occupations: Journalist, editor, publisher
- Known for: Founder and Editor of Daily Janakantha

Mohammad Atikullah Khan Masud (29 August 1951 – 22 March 2021) was a Bangladeshi journalist, editor, and publisher, best known as the founder and editor of the Bangla daily newspaper, Daily Janakantha. He was the chairperson of Globe Janakantha Shilpa Paribar.

== Early life ==
Masud was born on 29 August 1951 in Medini Mandal, Munshiganj District, East Bengal, Pakistan.

== Career ==
Masud founded Globe Janakantha Shilpa Paribar in 1969 as a 17-year-old college student. He exported betel leaf from East Pakistan to West Pakistan taking an advantage of the price difference between the two wings of Pakistan. He fought in the Bangladesh War of Independence under Sector 2 of the Mukti Bahini. He finished college after the Independence of Bangladesh.

Masud established Globe Insecticides Limited in 1978, becoming the largest manufacturer of insecticides in Bangladesh. He founded Globe Metal Complex Limited in 1990 with technical support from China.

Masud launched the Daily Janakantha in 1993, becoming one of Bangladesh's prominent national newspapers. It was the first newspaper in Bangladesh to be published across the country simultaneously using a microwave system. He established Globe Khamar Prokalpa Limited in 1997 and Globe Construction Limited in 1998.

Jamaat-ul-Mujahideen Bangladesh planned an attack on Masud in 2004 but failed to carry it out.

Masud was arrested in March 2007 by joint police and military forces under the Caretaker government from the Janakantha office in Eskaton; the same night Tareque Rahman, son of former Prime Minister Khaleda Zia, was arrested. He was taken to his residence in Dhaka Cantonment, the residence was then searched. He was sent to Dhaka Central Jail under the Special Powers Act, 1974.

The Anti-Corruption Commission filed four cases against Masud along with several former Rajdhani Unnayan Kartripakkha (RAJUK) officials, for corruption and document theft. The allegations include illegally obtaining building design approvals and stealing official documents with the help of complicit RAJUK personnel. Three RAJUK cases involve unauthorised approvals and concealment of corruption evidence, while the fourth case accuses Masud and his family of hiding assets worth approximately BDT 14 million. The cases were filed by ACC Deputy Assistant Director Mahmud Hasan at Motijheel and Ramna police stations.

Masud was charged with 15 crimes, including corruption and propaganda against the government. The Daily Star reported in January 2008 Masud and other prisoners were overstaying at the VIP inmate cell of the Bangabandhu Sheikh Mujib Medical University. After the report, he was sent back to jail. In March, he was sentenced to seven years imprisonment in one case. In September, some journalists wrote to the government for his bail on health grounds. He was freed after the Awami League came to power in 2009.

In 2015, Masud was found guilty of contempt of court by Chief Justice Surendra Kumar Sinha over an article on the war crimes trial against Salauddin Quader Chowhudry. In March 2016, an arrest warrant was issued against Masud over an alleged defamatory article on Chief Justice Surendra Kumar Sinha which alleged he was a member of the Shanti Bahini in 1971. In the same case, warrants were issued against his colleagues Toab Khan and Swadesh Roy. The case was filed by Arfan Uddin Khan, president of the Dhaka Metropolitan Bar Association. The Supreme Court also asked him to surrender in a forgery case from his 2007 detention.

== Bibliography ==
- Shei Razakar

== Personal life ==
Masud was married and had two sons.

== Death ==
Masud died on 22 March 2021 in Dhaka, Bangladesh. According to reports, he was rushed to Evercare Hospital around 5:30 am after suffering from breathing complications and was declared dead shortly afterwards. President Abdul Hamid, Prime Minister Sheikh Hasina, and deputy leader of the opposition Golam Mohammad Quader sent condolences following his death. Editors' Council President Mahfuz Anam and General Secretary Naem Nizam sent their condolences.
