= Janakantha =

Daily newspaper in Dhaka, Bangladesh

- Logo used since 2025

- 10 September 2023 front page of Janakantha
- Type: Daily newspaper
- Format: Print, online
- Owner: Globe Janakantha Shilpa Paribar
- Editor: Mohammad Atikullah Khan Masud
- Founded: 1993
- Political alignment: Left-wing
- Language: Bengali
- Website: www.dailyjanakantha.com

The Daily Janakantha (Bengali: দৈনিক জনকণ্ঠ; Dainik Janakanṭha "Daily People's Voice") is a Bengali daily newspaper published from Dhaka, Bangladesh. It is owned by Janakantha Shilpa Paribar (GJSP).

== History ==
This newspaper was first published on 21 February 1993. Mohammad Atikullah Khan Masud was the editor of the newspaper till his death. Janakantha created Janakantha Gunijan Sammanana and Pratibha Sammanana awards.

In 1999, Bangladesh Army personnel defused a landmine left at the newspaper office by suspected Islamist militants.

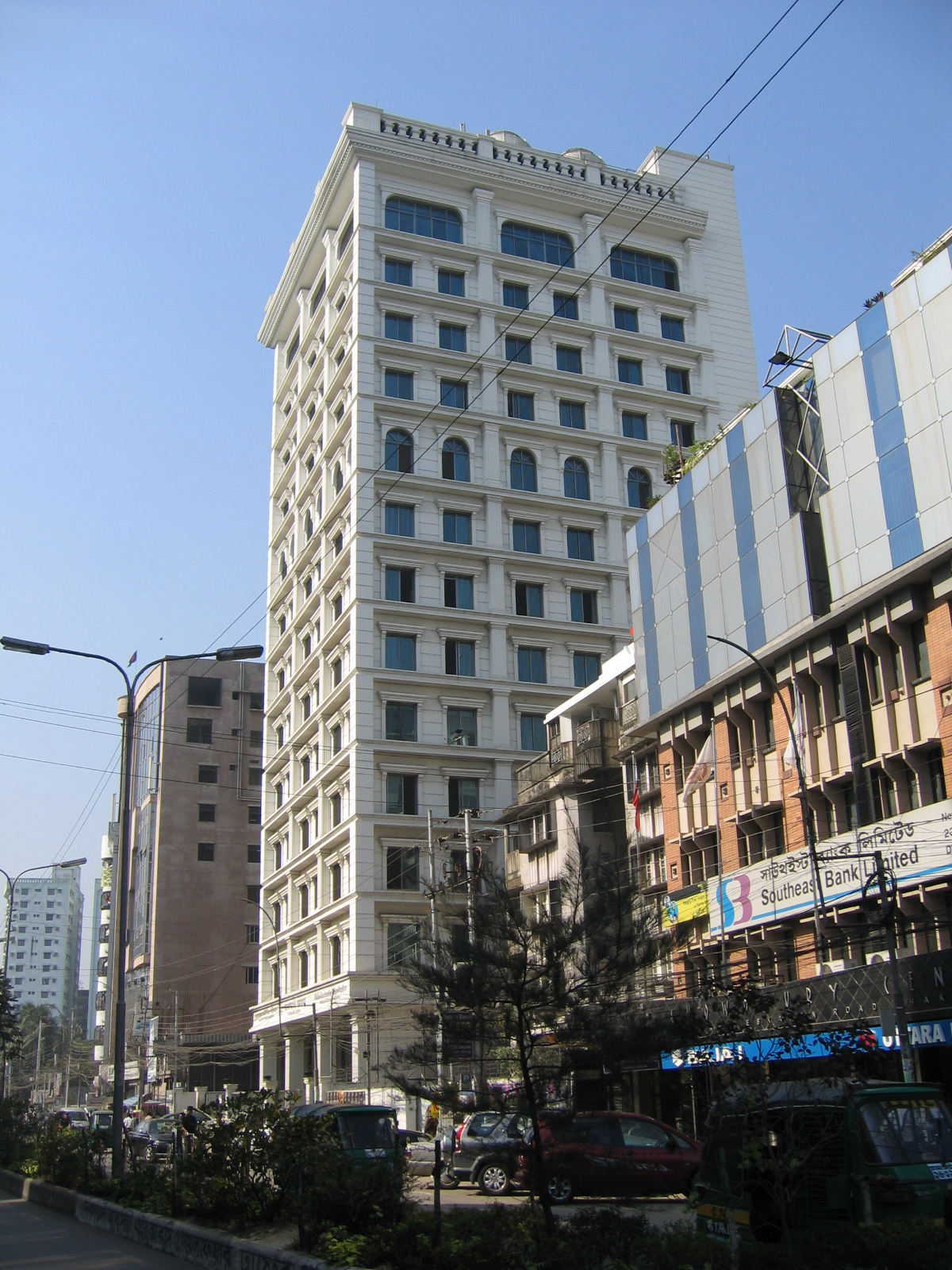
Janakantha Bhaban, headquarters of Janakantha

Mohammad Atikullah Khan Masud, editor of Janakantha, was arrested by joint forces on 7 March 2007 from Janakantha Bhaban. He was charged with using fraud to get designs approved for two buildings in Hosseini Dalan Road from Rajdhani Unnayan Kartripakkha. Tanzeena Ismail, Judge of Special Court-6, sentenced him to seven years imprisonment. In October 2007 a fraud case was withdrawn against him after he settled the matter out of court with the accuser. The accuser had alleged Masud had taken a deposit for a flat which he had not provided or returned the deposit.

A former reporter of Janakantha, Aghore Mondal, threaten legal action after the newspaper accused him of using its name to secure accredations for the 2007 ICC World Twenty20.

In January 2009, the editor of Janakantha, Mohammad Atikullah Khan Masud secured bail in four corruption cases filed by the Anti-Corruption Commission. Justice Md Shamsul Huda and Justice Abu Bakar Siddiquee of the High Court Division acquitted him in a corruption case.

An auto-rickshaw carrying journalists of the Janakantha was shot at killing the driver and a nearby rickshaw-puller in April 2015.

On 29 July 2015, a contempt of court verdict was issued against Janakantha, editor Swadesh Roy, and publisher Atiqullah Khan Masud over a report on Salauddin Quader Chowdhury. The Appellate Division adjourned the hearing following an appeal by the defendants. The two were found guilty of contempt of court and fined 10 thousand BDT which was to be donated to a charity.

Former president of Dhaka Metropolitan Bar Association Arfan Uddin Khan filed a defamation case over a report on the newspaper which alleged a judge was writing the verdict against former Prime Minister Khaleda Zia after retirement. Arrest warrants were issued against Atiqullah Khan Masud, Toab Khan, and Swadesh Roy.

Executive Editor Swadesh Roy was one of the founders of the Editors Guild, Bangladesh in 2018.

On 12 April 2021, ten journalists who had been terminated from the newspaper where attacked as they were protesting outside the newspaper office. The injured journalists were treated at the Dhaka Community Hospital. Atikullah Khan Masud, editor of Janakantha, died at the age of 71. Salman F Rahman support loans from state owned Bank for the holding company of the newspaper, Globe Janakantha Shilpa Paribar.

After the fall of the Sheikh Hasina led Awami League government, the Habiganj correspondent of the newspaper was sued on charges of attacking students protesting against Hasina.

On 4 May 2025, a confrontation occurred at the Daily Janakantha office in Dhaka, reportedly triggered by a protest from journalists demanding overdue wages. Tensions escalated when a group of outsiders allegedly broke into the office, assaulted several journalists and staff, and disrupted the demonstration. The protest had been ongoing for several days, and five journalists involved had recently been dismissed without clear resolution of their dues. According to some Janakantha employees, the attackers were linked to the National Citizen Party (NCP). However, Zainal Abedin Shishir—Janakantha's Planning Advisor and an NCP leader—claimed the clash resulted from internal disputes and prior opposition by certain journalists to political protests, stating that police were called to defuse the situation. The NCP has since sought a formal explanation from Shishir regarding his role in the incident.

In August 2025, a dispute arose over the control of Janakantha following the formation of a rival editorial board by a faction of its staff. The newspaper’s editor and publisher, Shamima A Khan, accused Afizur Rahman, a retired major of the Bangladesh Army and former Directorate General of Forces Intelligence (DGFI) officer, of orchestrating a “hostile takeover” of the newspaper’s offices. According to Khan, a group entered the premises and replaced the editorial team under Rahman’s direction. Rahman denied the allegations, stating he had no involvement in the incident and was preoccupied with a family emergency. He described the accusations as false and maintained that his past actions during his tenure at the DGFI were performed as part of his official duties.

Rahman had previously served at DGFI for 11 years, during which time he was accused of press intimidation, including summoning journalists, influencing union elections, and exerting pressure on media coverage critical of government-aligned individuals. He was later appointed to executive positions at several media and academic institutions linked to businessman Chowdhury Nafeez Sarafat, including Dainik Bangla and the Canadian University of Bangladesh. Reports also alleged Rahman’s involvement in internal elections within journalist associations such as the Dhaka Reporters Unity and the Bangladesh Federal Union of Journalists. He denied interfering in these elections, stating his role was limited to coordination under official directives.

== See also ==
- List of newspapers in Bangladesh
- Bengali-language newspapers
