= Bashir Ullah =

Bashir Ullah or Bashirullah is a surname. Notable people with the surname include:

- A. N. M. Bashir Ullah (born 1956), Justice of the High Court Division of the Bangladesh Supreme Court
- Md. Bashir Ullah (born 1967), Justice of the High Court Division of the Bangladesh Supreme Court

== See also ==
- Bashir (name)
- Ullah
