= Jahangir Hossain =

Bangladeshi Judge

Justice of the High Court Division of Bangladesh
- In office 1986–2024

Personal details
- Born: Kabilpur, Senbag, Noakhali District, East Pakistan, Pakistan
- Education: University of Dhaka
- Profession: Judge

Jahangir Hossain a retired judge of the Appellate Division of Bangladesh Supreme Court.

== Early life ==
Jahangir Hossain was born on 31 December 1959 in Kabilpur, Senbag,Noakhali District, East Pakistan, Pakistan. Hossain finished his LL.B and Masters in Commerce from the University of Dhaka.

== Career ==
In 1986, Hossain started worked as an advocate at the District and Session Judge's Court. In 1991, Hossain started working as an advocate at the Bangladesh High Court. Hossain worked as a special public prosecutor in Dhaka. Hossain notably prosecuted the murder of the first President of Bangladesh, Sheikh Mujibur Rahman. On 18 April 2010, Hossain appointed as an Additional Judge on the Bangladesh High Court bench.

On 5 January 2012, Hossain and Justice AHM Shamsuddin Chowdhury, sentenced a university teacher, M Ruhul Amin, to 6 months in jail over a Facebook post on which he wished the death of Prime Minister Sheikh Hasina. On 15 April 2012, Hossain's appointment was made permanent. On 29 August 2012, Hossain was appointed as a judge to the International Crimes Tribunal-1 of the International Crimes Tribunal. Hossain faced some controversy after Skype conversation where Chairman of Tribunal, Justice Mohammad Nizamul Huq, made disparaging comments about Hossain and called him corrupt, were leaked to the media.

In December 2013, Hossain's home in Noakhali District was attacked.

Hossain was elevated to the Appellate Division from High Court in December 2022 by superseding many of his colleagues. On 10 August 2024 he has resigned in the face of student agitation.
