= Shibir Nasir =

Bangladeshi gangster

- শিবির নাসির
- Born: Nasir Uddin Chowdhury
- Status: On bail

Details
- Span of crimes: 1981–1998
- Country: Bangladesh
- Date apprehended: 1998

Shibir Nasir, born Nasir Uddin Chowdhury, is a cadre of Bangladesh Islami Chhatra Shibir and gangster from Chittagong. He was facing 36 cases with charges including extortion, kidnapping, and murder. He operated out of a dorm of Chittagong College.

== Career ==
Nasir was a cadre of Bangladesh Islami Chhatra Shibir who used him to keep control of Chittagong and nearby areas. He also worked for hire occasionally for other parties. He carried out his activities from two rooms of a dorm of Chittagong College.

Nasir was detained by Bangladesh Police on 15 June 1992 with a Pakistan made gun. on 15 June 1997, charges were framed against him over the incident.

Bangladesh Police tried to detain him from Chawbazar area of Chittagong leading to a violent clash between the police and his supporters in 1997.

Nasir was arrested on 9 April 1998 from a dorm of Chittagong College. He was intermittently kept in Chittagong Jail and Comilla Jail. His followers were Baittya Alamgir, BDR Selim, Chhota Saiful, Gittu Nasir, Habib Khan, Sajjad Khan, and Yakub after his arrest many of them were killed by security forces, detained, or fled from Bangladesh. Gittu Nasir murdered Chhota Saiful in an internal dispute and Rapid Action Battalion killed Baittya Alamgir, Gittu Nasir, and Yakub. The other three fled to the United Arab Emirates. His another associate, Giasuddin Iftekhar alias Gias Hazarika, was also killed in a crossfire. His elder sister Lili was also involved. He was also on the hit list of Rapid Action Battalion but he was still in prison. His associate, Md Ramzan alias Bhagina Ramzan, was arrested in 2004 with an AK-47.

According to a 2008 report of The Daily Star, Nasir was treated like a VIP prisoner and was allowed to meet his associates in hotel in Chittagong. In May 2008, he was sentenced to 17 years imprisonment in an arms case filed in 1992. His associate, Jahangir Alam, was arrested in 2008.

In 2017, Nasir was sentenced to five years imprisonment in a case filed over attacking police officers in Chittagong College. Mosharraf Hossain, Minister of Housing and Public Works, testified Nasir had threatened to kill him at gunpoint after killing freedom fighter Harun Basha. He was acquitted in the murder of Zamir Uddin, general secretary of the students union at the Chittagong Polytechnic Institute in 2015, and the murder of Gopal Krishna Muhuri, principal of Nazirhat College. Gopal Krishna Muhuri had banned Islami Chattra shibir in his college.

Nasir applied for bail in 2022 after crossfire deaths stopped but was denied.

Nasir was released on 11 August 2024, after the fall of Awami League and Prime Minister Sheikh Hasina. He had a total of 36 cases against him. He was acquitted in 31 cases against him and found guilty in three cases. He served the prison term of those three cases. He has three other cases against him in which he was able to secure bail.
