= Jubilee Bank =

Commercial bank in Bangladesh

- Industry: Banking
- Founded: Kushtia, Bangladesh
- Headquarters: Kushtia, Bangladesh
- Products: Banking services Consumer Banking; Corporate Banking; Investment Banking
- Net income: ▲

Jubilee Bank (Bengali: জুবিলী ব্যাংক) was one of the oldest commercial banks in Bangladesh. It was a non-scheduled bank, one of five in Bangladesh. The others are Ansar-VDP Unnayan Bank, Grameen Bank, Karmasangsthan Bank, and Palli Sanchay Bank. It was scheduled for liquidation in 2022.

== History ==
Jubilee Bank was founded in 1913 in Khoksa, Kushtia as the Khoksha-Janipur Bank. The bank was renamed to Khoksha-Janipur Loan Company in 1964 under the 1962 Banking Companies Ordinance. After the independence of Bangladesh in 1971, owner of Afil Jute Mills Limited, Mohammad, served as the chairman of the bank. In 1987, Khoksha-Janipur Bank was renamed to Jubilee Bank. In 1988 the bank with permission from Bangladesh Bank was transformed into a commercial bank with Mia Abdur Rashid, co-chairman of Bangladesh Freedom Party, as chairman. The bank gained some notoriety for having shares owned by Colonel Khandaker Abdur Rashid, Colonel Syed Farooq Rahman, Major Bazlul Huda. They were the convicted assassins of Sheikh Mujibur Rahman, President of Bangladesh. Their shares were confiscated by the government of Bangladesh. The bank had no branches and operated from Kushtia headquarters. The bank did not inform the Registrar of Joint Stock Companies And Firms about their ownership as required by law.

In 2000, there were ten non-scheduled banks in Bangladesh. MBI Munshi was made the chairman of the bank in 2002.

In September 2018, Bangladesh Bank appointed Md Shah Alam, a director of Bangladesh Bank, chairman of the Jubilee Bank.

On 27 December 2020, Bangladesh Bank removed the Chairperson of the bank, Md. Shah Alam, and also dissolved the working committee of the bank. Following a High Court verdict by justice Muhammad Khurshid Alam Sarkar, Bangladesh Bank started taking steps to liquidate Jubilee Bank. In June 2021, the government cancelled the registration of Jubilee Bank with a notification on the Bangladesh Gazette.

Justice Muhammad Khurshid Alam Sarkar appointed retired justice AHM Shamsuddin Chowdhury Manik on 3 February 2022 liquidator of Jubilee Bank. Barrister Faria Huq was appointed an additional liquidator of Jubilee Bank.
