= Globe Janakantha Shilpa Paribar =

Bangladeshi industrial conglomerate

- Type: Public
- Industry: Construction, engineering, electrical cables, information technology, printing, media
- Founded: 1969; 57 years ago
- Headquarters: Dhaka, Bangladesh
- Number of employees: 2500
- Website: www.globe-janakantha.com

Globe Janakantha Shilpa Paribar (GJSP) is one of the largest Bangladeshi conglomerates. The industries under this conglomerate include construction, engineering, electrical cables, information technology, printing, media etc. It was founded in 1969 by Mohammad Atikullah Khan Masud.

Small, medium and large family owned businesses dominate over Bangladesh's $100 billion ($288 billion in PPP GDP) economy, which has been growing at over 5 percent a year since 1995.

== History ==
In 2025, cartoonist Kishore alleged that the Chief Operating Officer, major Afizur Rahman, of the company has similarity with sketch of alleged torturer. With demand for arrest citing relation with enforced disappearance, torture, and abuse. Afizur denied the allegation stating that he never wore glasses as seen in the sketch.

== List of companies ==
- Globe Insecticides Ltd.
- Globe Metal Complex Ltd.
- Globe Cables Limited
- Janakantha, a popular daily newspaper in Bangladesh
- Globe Khamar Prokalpa Ltd.
- Globe Construction Ltd.
- Globe Technologies Ltd.

== See also ==
- List of companies of Bangladesh
