= Kalantar =

Indian newspaper

- Owner: Communist Party of India West Bengal State Council
- Publisher: Swapan Banerjee
- Editor: Kalyan Bandyopadhyay
- Founded: 1965; 60 years ago
- Language: Bengali
- City: Kolkata
- Country: India
- Website: cpikalantar.blogspot.com

Kalantar is a daily Bengali-language newspaper issued from Kolkata, India. It is the organ of the West Bengal State Council of the Communist Party of India. It was published as a weekly newspaper since 1965; 'Kalantar' converted to a daily newspaper in the late 1960s. And have a separate weekly as it is. The header of the 'Kalantar' daily was designed by the legend film maker-artist Satyajit Ray himself. Among the early editors, veteran communist leader Somnath Lahiri, Bhabani Sen, Jyoti Dasgupta, Prabhat Dasgupta, Prof. Gautam Chattopadhyay were there. From the single-color edition it is now publishing as a four-color daily newspaper. In the autumn, Kalantar publish a festive 'Sharadiyo' edition in the book form as like as other daily newspapers in Kolkata.
