= Ataus Samad =

Bangladeshi journalist

- Born: 16 November 1937; Mymensingh District Bengal Presidency, British India
- Died: 26 September 2012 (aged 74); Dhaka, Bangladesh
- Resting place: Azimpur Graveyard
- Awards: Ekushey Padak

Ataus Samad (16 November 1937 – 26 September 2012) was a Bangladeshi journalist. He was awarded Ekushey Padak in 1992 by the Government of Bangladesh.

== Early life and education ==
Samad was born November 16, 1937, in Kishoreganj District. He earned post graduation degree from University of Dhaka in 1959.

== Career ==
Samad started his journalism career in 1959. He was the chief reporter of the Pakistan Observer from 1965 to 1969. He was the general secretary of the East Pakistan Union of Journalists from 1969 to 1970. Between 1982 and 1994, Samad was the special correspondent of BBC in Dhaka. He was also a special correspondent of Bangladesh Sangbad Sangstha (BSS) in New Delhi during 1972 to 1976. He served as the advisory editor of the daily Amar Desh. At the same time he was the editor of Weekly Ekhon. Later, he also served as the chief executive of the television channel NTV for some time. Besides, he worked as a part-time teacher of the University of Dhaka for a long time. He was imprisoned for his reporting in BBC during the presidency of Hussain Mohammad Ershad.

== Personal life ==
Samad was married to Quamrun Nahar. Together they had a son Ashequs, and two daughters Nayeema and Samia.
