= 2012 ICT Skype controversy =

The 2012 ICT Skype controversy was the leaking of Skype conversations and emails between Mohammed Nizamul Huq, head judge and chairman of Bangladesh's International Crimes Tribunal, and Ahmed Ziauddin, a Bangladeshi lawyer based in Brussels. These conversations took place during the prosecution of the accused for alleged war crimes during the Bangladesh Liberation War in 1971.

According to The Economist, the recordings and emails suggested that the Bangladesh Government pressured and attempted to intervene in the International Crimes Tribunal to speed up proceedings. The neutrality and independence of Huq was called into question, as Ziauddin appeared to help him to prepare documents for the tribunal and made detailed recommendations for Huq. Ziauddin also advised prosecutors, including the chief prosecutor Zaed-al-Malum, and informed Huq about how the prosecutors may develop their cases. This resulted in a connection between the judge, adviser and the prosecution.

The 17 hours of conversations between 28 August and 20 October 2012 and more than 230 e-mails between September 2011 and September 2012 were disclosed to The Economist. The Bangladeshi newspaper Amar Desh also received the conversations, and published a report on 9 December, followed by the transcripts in full. On 13 December, a court injunction banned Bangladeshi newspapers from publishing the materials, at which time Amar Desh stopped further publication.

On 11 December 2012, Huq resigned from his position as chairman of ICT-1, citing personal reasons. Despite demands from Jamaat-e-Islami for the Tribunal to be scrapped, the Law Minister Shafique Ahmed said that Huq's resignation would not hamper trial proceedings. On 13 December, Fazle Kabir, then head of the second tribunal (ICT-2), was named as the new chairman. The defendants' applications for retrials were rejected.

== Key figures ==
- Justice Mohammed Nizamul Huq, chair of the International Crimes Tribunal
- Ahmed Ziauddin, a Bangladeshi expatriate lawyer based in Brussels, longtime colleague of Huq
- The Economist and journalists Rob Gifford and Adam Roberts
- Mahmudur Rahman, editor of Amar Desh
- Guardian Consulting LLC, a US-based security firm

== Background ==
The International Crimes Tribunal was set up in Bangladesh in 2009 to prosecute suspects accused of war crimes during the Bangladesh Liberation War. The Awami League had pledged to do so in the campaign for the 2008 election. Between 2010 and 2012, the tribunal indicted eleven men as suspects; they are now political leaders, nine from Jamaat-e-Islami, two from the BNP and zero from the Awami League. At the time of the Skype controversy, the trials of Salahuddin Quader Chowdhury, Motiur Rahman Nizami and Ghulam Azam were underway at ICT-1 and the trial of Delwar Hossain Sayeedi had nearly finished.

On 6 December 2012, the presiding judge of ICT-1, Mohammed Nizamul Huq, passed an order requiring two members of The Economist to appear before the court, demanding that they explain how they came into possession of e-mails and conversations between him and lawyer Ziauddin. This order came after The Economist contacted Huq about the material they had. The order named Ahmed Ziauddin as an expert assisting the judges, explaining that the judges needed research support as the tribunal is based on new law. On 9 December, the newspaper Amar Desh began publishing reports and transcripts of the conversations, and The Economist published a further report on 15 December.

== Revelations ==
According to The Economist, the Skype conversations and e-mails suggested that the Bangladesh Government pressured and attempted to intervene in the International Crimes Tribunal to speed proceedings up. During a conversation between Huq and Ziauddin on 14 October, Huq referred to the government as

Absolutely crazy for a judgment. The government has gone totally mad. They have gone completely mad, I am telling you. They want a judgment by 16th December (Victory Day)...it's as simple as that.

On 15 October, Huq described how a member of the government "came to visit me this evening. He asked me to pass this verdict fast. I told him 'how can I do that?'... He said, 'Try as quick as you can.'"

The Economist also reported the communications revealed Brussels-based lawyer Ziauddin's influence in the trial. Between 28 August and 20 October, the two men spoke for the equivalent of almost 20 minutes every day. Ziauddin appeared to help Huq prepare documents. On 12 May, Ziauddin sent Huq a document called "GhulamAzamChargesFinalDraft", and the next day the tribunal issued an identical document as its indictment against Ghulam Azam. Ziauddin also advised Huq on the future of Huq's fellow judge Shahinur Islam, saying, "If he does not stop he has to go as well, because it is so harmful to us."

The Economist further adds that the conversations reveal that Ziauddin discussed the same issues with the judge and the prosecutors, including the chief prosecutor Zaed-al-Malum. On 11 December 2011 he sent Malum and another prosecutor help on the case against Azam and forwarded this advice to Huq. After the prosecutors laid their charges, Ziauddin continued to advise Huq on the accusations.

During the conversations, one or both of the men referred to Justice Jahangir Hossain as "corrupt." Before Justice Huq resigned, Hossain gave an emotional speech in court in his own defence (Huq was absent). Hossain objected to Huq and Ziauddin's characterisation of him. He also objected to Amar Desh's coverage of the Skype conversations. Hossain said he had been appointed to sit on a case that involved Mahmudur Rahman (now editor of Amar Desh) while he had been appointed as Energy Advisor in the BNP government. Hossain said that Rahman should not have included his name in a large headline.

== Ahmed Ziauddin ==
Ahmed Ziauddin is a Bangladeshi lawyer and academic specializing in international courts of law, who lives and works in Brussels, Belgium. He was born in Dhaka, then part of East Pakistan, where he went to college and law school, and his brother was a friend of Mohammed Nizamul Huq. They have known each other for many years. Ziauddin is a professor of international law at Catholic University of Brussels, where he is the full-time director of the Bangladesh Centre for Genocide Studies. The center campaigns to end what he has called "the ingrained culture of impunity" regarding the 1971 war crimes in Bangladesh.

Ziauddin is also known for his advocacy of the Rome Statute of the International Criminal Court as he lobbied Asian governments to sign and ratify the treaty Ziauddin was affiliated since 2001 as coordinator for the Asian Network of the Coalition for the International Criminal Court (CICC) and its efforts to lobby United Nations-member countries to sign the Rome Statute that established by treaty the International Criminal Court. He worked to get Asian countries, such as Pakistan and Bangladesh, to sign and then ratify the treaty Bangladesh signed and then ratified in 2010. In that same year, Bangladesh's ratification of the Rome Statute made possible its establishment of Bangladesh's International Crimes Tribunal.

His lobbying of Bangladesh for the Rome Treaty was also connected to his desire to see the war crimes trial take place there. He said previous governments in Bangladesh had not dealt with the war crimes. He also wrote that the International Criminal Court did not negate the role of nations; he wrote, "The ICC is only a complementary court. It is intended to supplement national courts, which are primarily responsible to try war crimes, crimes against humanity and acts of Genocide." He also said that the Rome Statute would protect the country; he said, "As Bangladesh works to address impunity for past crimes and re-establish the rule of law, joining the ICC will help ensure that grave crimes are not committed in the future."

During the war crimes trial, Ziauddin advised lead Justice Nizamul Huq. He also drafted charges against one of the accused, Ghulam Azam. Weeks before the Skype controversy came to public light, Ziauddin attended a conference at the Assembly of States Parties of the International Criminal Court at The Hague in November 2012 where Toby Cadman, who is the defense attorney for the accused in Bangladesh's International Crimes Tribunal and the most high-profile critic of the process. Cadman presented a paper that linked the Rome Statute with the problems of the ICT: "lack of transparency; discriminatory intent of the legislation and tribunal; lack of clear definitions of crimes; absence of rules of disclosure; and investigations being conducted under a cloak of secrecy."

Ziauddin described his professional relationship with Huq in The Economist as follows:

It's up to judges to decide where they are going to get research support or other support they need. They are quite entitled to do it. The more so when they really don’t have that research backup [in Bangladesh]. [They ask for help] if they feel if there are people more informed about the issue, especially where [international law] is so new in Bangladesh ... I’m not really advising him, but if there is a question then I try to respond.

After the disclosure of their conversations came to light, Ziauddin was also called before Bangladesh's war crimes court to answer for his participation, a case which is in progress.

== Aftermath ==
On 11 December 2012, Huq resigned from his position as chairman of ICT-1, citing personal reasons. Despite demands from Jamaat-e-Islami for the tribunal to be scrapped, the Law Minister Shafique Ahmed said that Huq's resignation would not hamper trial proceedings. He said that Huq had in no way behaved improperly and had the right to consult with experts in the law. On 13 December, Fazle Kabir, then head of the second tribunal (ICT-2), was named as the new chairman.

On 19 December, the defence submitted applications for a retrial. A petition was also filed to remove the chief prosecutor Zaed-al-Malum. Salahuddin Quader Chowdhury, BNP MP on trial at ICT-1, demanded adjournment of his case until the petition was settled. On 3 January, the defendants' applications for retrials were rejected.

The editor of Amar Desh, Mahmudur Rahman, was arrested on remand on 11 April 2013 for a number of charges, including sedition for publishing the Skype material, as well as other reporting from Amar Desh about the 2013 Shahbag protests. The Asian Human Rights Commission reports that they are informed that Rahman has been tortured in police custody.
