= Ekdin =

Indian newspaper

Ekdin (একদিন)

- Front page of Ekdin
- Type: Daily newspaper
- Format: Broadsheet
- Owner(s): Narshingha Broadcasting Pvt. Ltd.
- Publisher: Krishnanand Singh
- Editor: Santosh Kumar Singh
- Founded: 2006
- Language: Bengali
- Headquarters: Kolkata, India
- Website: ekdin-epaper.com

The Daily Ekdin (Bengali: একদিন, meaning "One Day"), is a daily newspaper, published from West Bengal in Bengali language. It is one of the largest circulated Bengali language newspapers in India. Santosh Kumar Singh is the editor of the newspaper.

== History ==
Ekdin was founded in 2006.

== Editors ==
Santosh Kumar Singh is the current editor of the newspaper.
