= Bangladesh Press Council =

Bangladeshi Quasi-judicial Institution

- Formation: 1979
- Headquarters: Segunbagicha, Dhaka, Bangladesh
- Region served: Bangladesh
- Official language: Bengali
- Chairman: Justice Mohammed Nizamul Huq Nassim
- Parent organization: Ministry of Information and Broadcasting (Bangladesh)
- Website: www.presscouncil.gov.bd

Bangladesh Press Council (Bengali: বাংলাদেশ প্রেস কাউন্সিল) is a quasi-judicial institution that protects freedom of speech and regulates the press in Bangladesh and is located in Segunbagicha, Dhaka, Bangladesh.

== History ==
The act to establish the institution was passed in 1974. The institution was established on 18 August 1979. In 2016, the Bangladesh Law Commission recommended that the council be given the power to close any newspaper temporarily.

Justice Mohammad Mamtaj Uddin Ahmed was reappointed chairperson of the Bangladesh Press Council for a two-year term in August 2017.
