= Toab Khan =

Bangladeshi journalist (1934–2022)

- Born: 24 April 1934; Satkhira, Bengal Presidency, British India
- Died: 1 October 2022 (aged 88)
- Occupation: Journalist

Toab Khan (24 April 1934 – 1 October 2022) was a Bangladeshi journalist. He served as the Advisory Editor of the Bengali daily Janakantha. He was awarded Ekushey Padak in 2016 by the Government of Bangladesh.

== Early life and career ==
Toab Khan was born on 24 April 1934 in Satkhira. He started journalism in 1955. He worked for Dainik Sangbad and Dainik Pakistan. He was a press secretary to Prime Minister Sheikh Mujibur Rahman and later he served as a chief information officer and director general of the Press Institute of Bangladesh (PIB). He was also a press secretary to President HM Ershad and President Shahabuddin Ahmed. He died on 1 October 2022, at the age of 88.

== Awards ==
- Ekushey Padak (2016) – Journalism.
