= Swadesh Roy =

Bangladeshi journalist (born 1961)

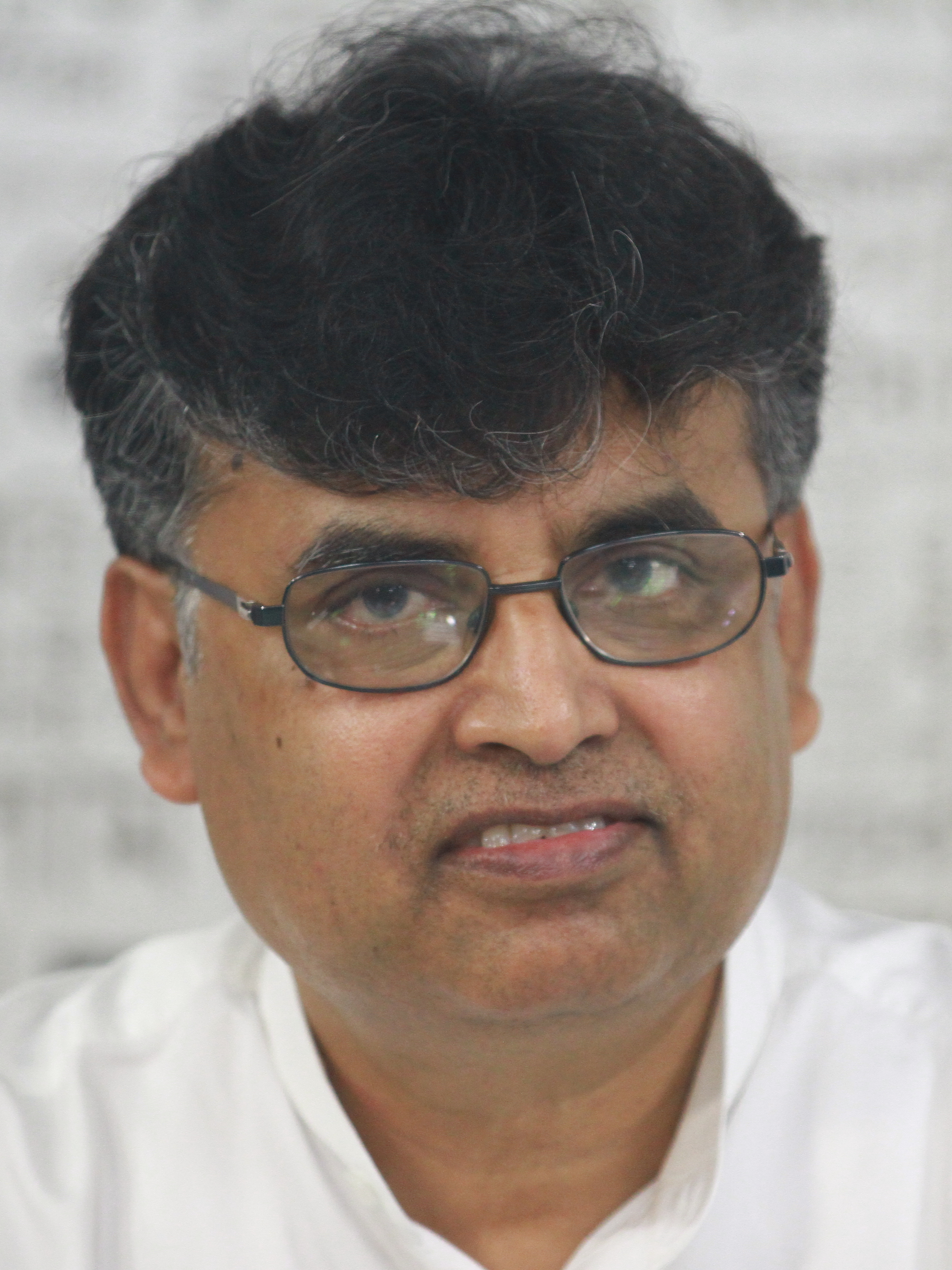
- Born: 5 June 1961 (age 64); Khulna, East Pakistan, Pakistan
- Education: Paikgachha High School; Bagerhat PC College; University of Dhaka
- Alma mater: University of Dhaka
- Occupation: Journalist
- Awards: Ekushey Padak

Swadesh Roy (born 5 June 1961) is a Bangladeshi journalist. He was awarded Ekushey Padak in 2017 by the Government of Bangladesh in the journalism category. He has over 22 books published, some of which include Muniar Chok, Chibuk Paharer Shada Murti, Mousumi Bou, and Meghnar Buke Lata. His most recent book is Ma Shukhtara Dhekten. He is also a political analyst.

== Education and career ==
Roy passed the SSC from Paikgachha High School in 1977 and the HSC from Bagerhat PC College in 1981. He completed his bachelor's in management from the University of Dhaka.

Roy was the executive editor of Janakantha.

He is the editor of NewsBangla24.com.

=== Court case ===
On July 16, 2015, Roy wrote an article "Saka Paribarer Totporota! Palabar Path Kome Gechhe" (tr: "Lobbying by Salauddin Quader's family! Escape route got narrowed"). The article mentioned that a member of the Supreme Court bench, the Chief Justice was involved in hearing the appeal of Salauddin Quader Chowdhury had met with the convict's family members. The contempt was challenged by Roy, who provided evidence for his case, in which the Chief Justice admitted to be involved. Furthermore, the Ganajagaran Mancha spokesperson had announced continuous demonstrations at Shahbagh, ahead of the verdict day, to make sure ‘no conspiracy’ reduces or overturns justice. However, the apex court issued a contempt rule against Roy and the publisher Atiqullah Khan Masud. On August 14, 2015, they were sentenced to confinement in the courtroom for three hours and fined Tk 10,000.

== Personal life ==
Roy is married to Chitra Roy, a Supreme Court lawyer.
