= Nazirhat College =

- নাজিরহাট কলেজ
- Established: 1949
- Location: Nazirhat, Hathazari Upazila, Chittagong District, Bangladesh; 22.6350°N 91.7879°E
- Language: Bengali

Nazirhat College is a higher secondary education institution situated at Nazirhat in Hathazari Upazila of Chittagong District. It is located on the west bank of the river Halda

== History ==
Nazirhat College was established in 1949 on the north side of Hathazari area. It was the only institution for study before creating University of Chittagong in this area.

On 21 February 1965, students erected a Shaheed Minar (martyrs' monument) on campus to commemorate Shaheed Day. Five students were initially expelled for taking this action without permission from the college authorities. After students went on strike in support of those expelled, the principal rescinded the expulsions and commended the students' "love for Bengali".

Gopal Krishna Muhuri was the principal, who was murdered in his home in 2001.

On 10 January 2016, water resource minister Anisul Islam laid the foundation stone for an academic building and an administrative building of the college.

== See also ==
- List of colleges in Chittagong
