= Mohammad Mosaddak Ali =

Bangladeshi entrepreneur and politician (born 1960)

- মোহাম্মদ মোসাদ্দেক আলী
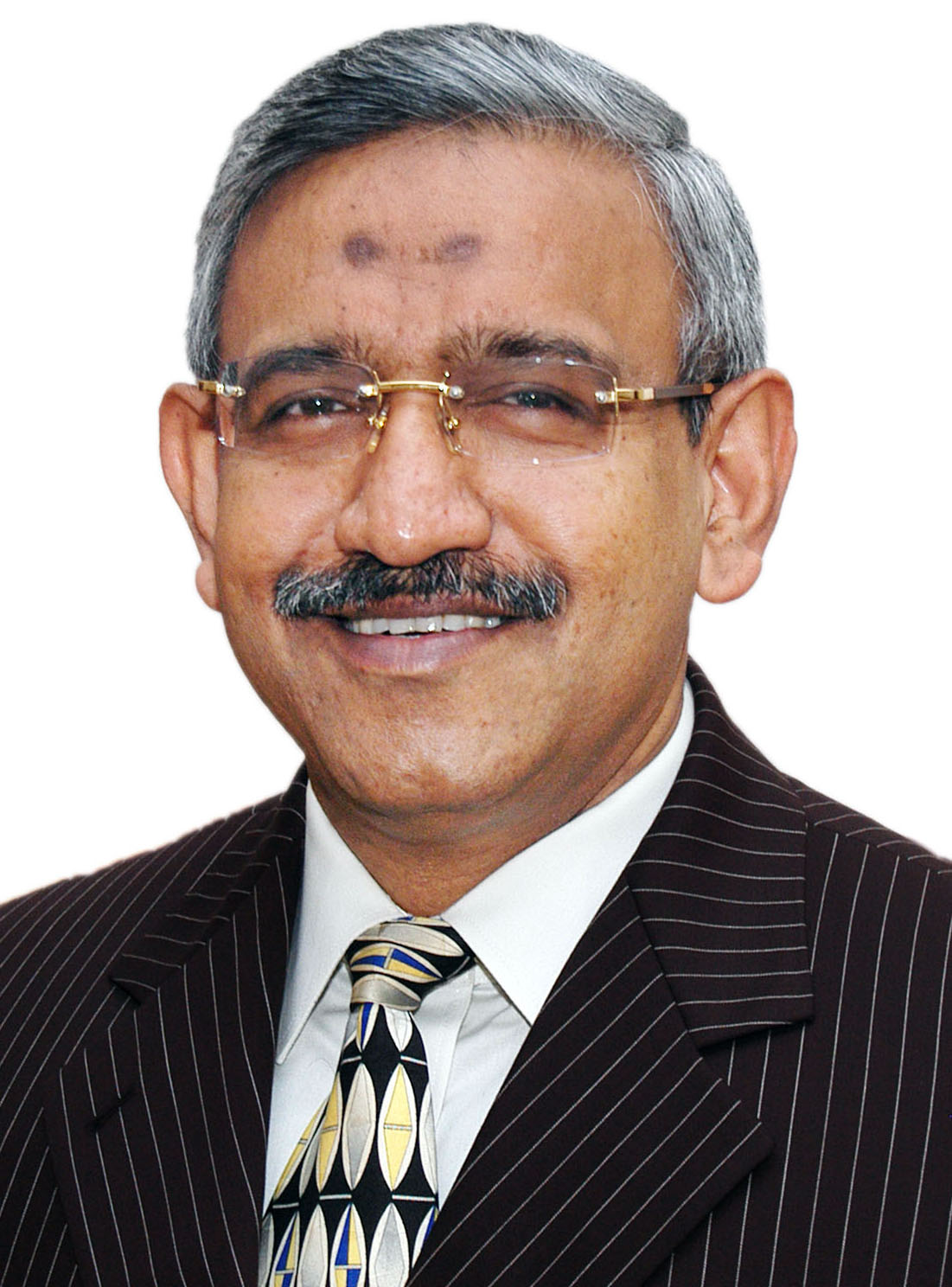
- Born: 7 April 1960 (age 66); Dacca, East Pakistan, Pakistan
- Other name: Phalu
- Citizenship: Pakistan (1960–1971); Bangladesh (from 1971)
- Education: University of Dhaka
- Occupation: Businessman
- Political party: Bangladesh Nationalist Party (former)
- Spouse: Mahbuba Sultana
- Children: 1
- Website: www.mosaddakali.com

Mohammad Mosaddak Ali (born 7 April 1960), also known as Mosaddak Ali Phalu, is a Bangladeshi entrepreneur and a politician who was a former parliamentarian from Bangladesh Nationalist Party (BNP). He served as the political secretary to the Prime Minister of Bangladesh Begum Khaleda Zia between 2001 and 2004. He was responsible for building special relations and partnership for development between the government and the private sector that is interested in investing in new and highly potential industrial sectors, and introducing new products and services to local industries, at a time when Bangladesh's economic growth accelerated. In 2003, Ali launched Bangladesh's first automation-based private satellite television station NTV. He also founded another satellite channel RTV and Bengali daily newspaper Amar Desh. He is the founding President of Association of Television Channel Owners (ATCO).

== Early life and education ==
Ali was born on 7 April 1960. His father Alhaj Abdul Mannan was a businessman and social worker and mother Mrs Ramon Bibi a housewife and they had six children. Mosaddak Ali is the youngest one of them. He is married to Mahbuba Sultana and the couple has one daughter, Roza Ali. He started his school life at Don Junior High School (which was closed down during the war 1971) and he then went to Shahjahanpur Railway Colony High School. He had completed his bachelor's degree (with honours) under the University of Dhaka in 1980.

== Career ==
Ali started his business in the mid-1980s establishing Brotherhood Enterprise Ltd. Now he is the chairman of his own securities company MAH Securities Ltd, a member of Dhaka stock exchange Ltd. His subsequent investments include a joint venture with China for manufacturing ceramics, steel fabrication manufacturing company and healthcare consumer products manufacturing company. Currently, he is the Chairman of Dhaka-Shanghai Ceramics Ltd. He is the Chairman of Roza Properties, Chairman Roza Agro Ltd., Roza Director at Union Insurance Company Ltd., Director at Rakeen Development Co. (Bd) Ltd., Director at SM Aabashon Ltd., Director at Ashlaoy Housing and Development Ltd., Director at Star Porcelain Ltd. and chairman at Roza Industrial Park Ltd.. Ali is a former chairman at The Cox Today Limited, former chairman at Brotherhood Enterprises Limited, former chairman at Build Trade Structures Ltd., former chairman at Brotherhood Securities Limited, former chairman at Build Trade Engineering Limited and former chairman at Build Trade Color Coat Ltd. He was the former Chairman of International Finance Investment and Commerce Bank Limited (IFIC Bank).

=== Media business ===
==== NTV ====
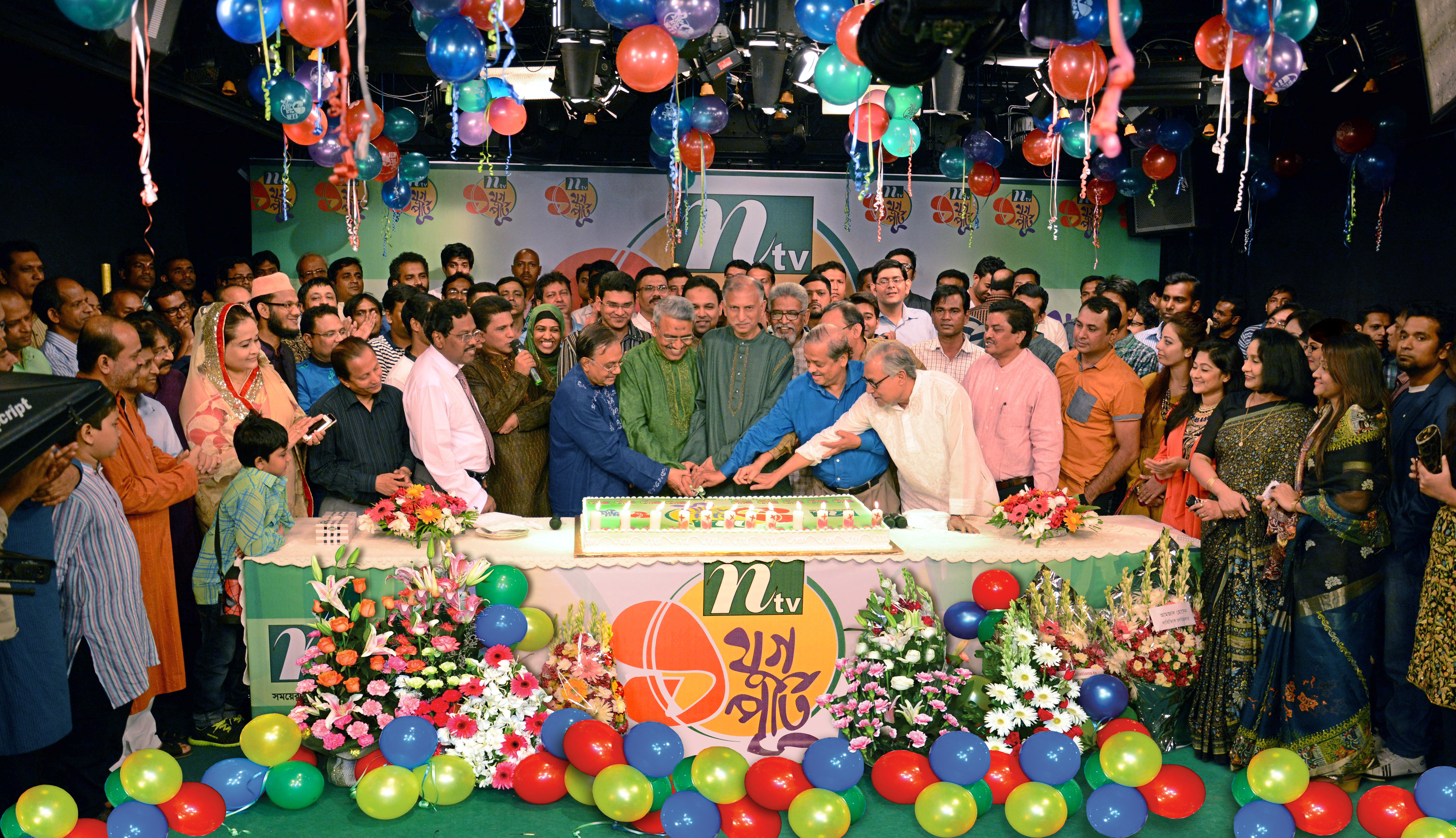
Ali along with the country's prominent personalities cutting cake marking the 12th founding anniversary of NTV at its office

Ali became chairman and managing director of Bengali language channel NTV in 2003. NTV has established itself as one of the most popular Bengali language TV channels in Bangladesh. As the chairman and managing director of NTV, Ali launched its operation in the United States of America in 2004, Canada in 2005, the United Kingdom and Europe in 2010, and the United Arab Emirates in 2014 and opened its Australia office in Sydney in 2015. Bangladesh Online Media Association (BOMA) awarded NTV Online as the best online portal in Bangladesh for being popular in home and abroad.

==== RTV ====
Ali launched in December 2005 his second television channel RTV. He is a former Chairman of RTV, the 1st 24-hour broadcasting TV channel in Bangladesh.

==== Amar Desh ====
Ali began publishing Amar Desh, a Bangla daily newspaper, in 2004. He is the founder Chairman of Amar Desh. The newspaper continued its publication even after a fire incident that damaged its office.

== Involvement in politics ==
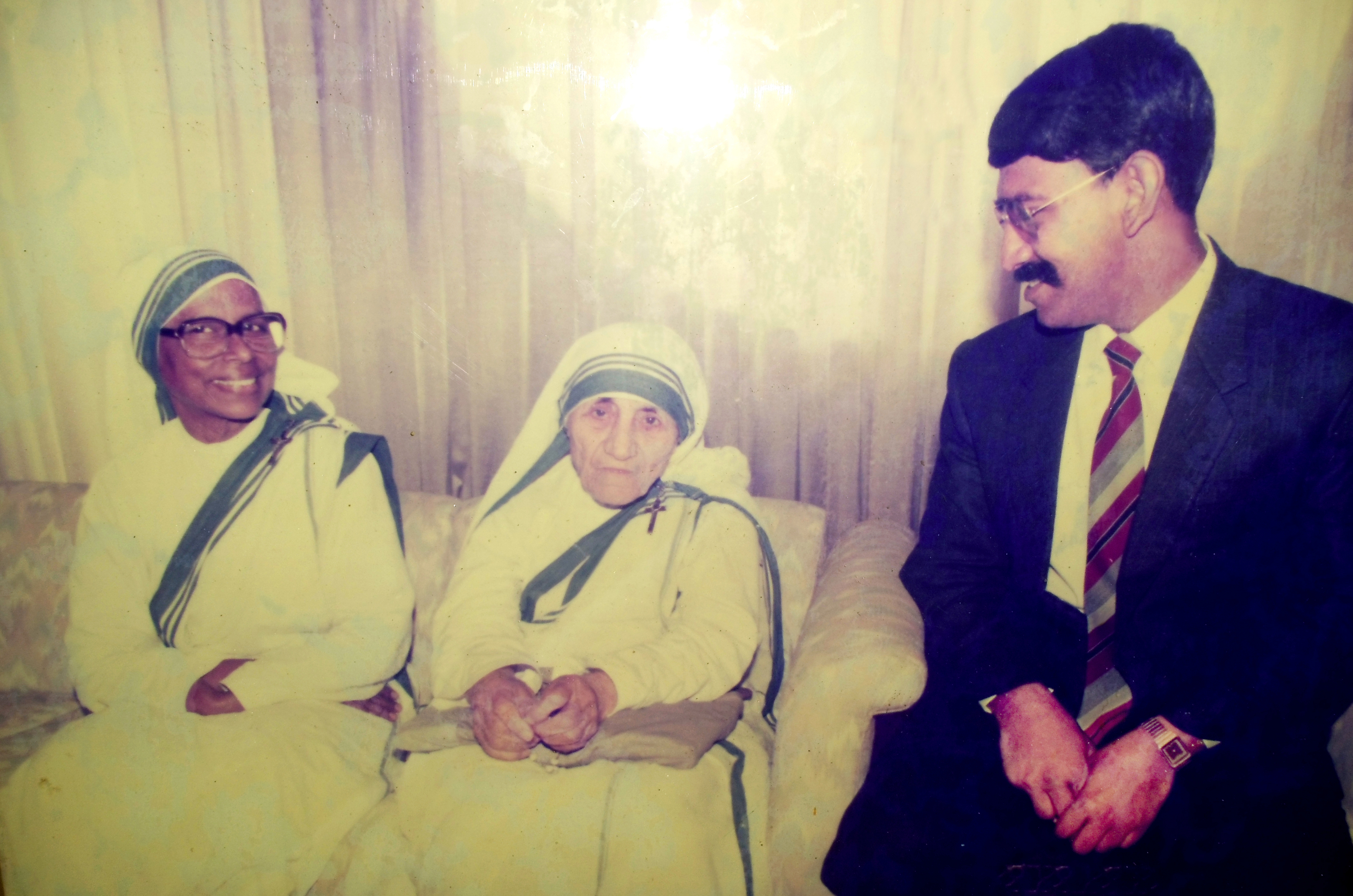
Ali with Mother Teresa at Zia International Airport in Dhaka (1991)

Ali joined politics in 1979 and played an active role in anti-autocracy movement in the 1980s. He was the private secretary (1991 to 1996) to Prime Minister Begum Khaleda Zia. From 1996 to 2001, Ali was political secretary of the BNP Chairperson and leader of the opposition of parliament.

When Khaleda Zia was sworn in as Prime Minister in 2001, Ali was appointed her political secretary, a position he held until he resigned for contesting a by-election in Dhaka in 2004. The BNP central committee later declared Ali as vice president. Though he has already resigned from the position, his name is still there as vice president in central committee. Ali continued to be a close aide of Khaleda Zia after Zia and Ali were released from prison and the caretaker regime ended. He was selected into the advisory council, now consisting of 32 members, following the Fifth National Council of the Bangladesh Nationalist Party.

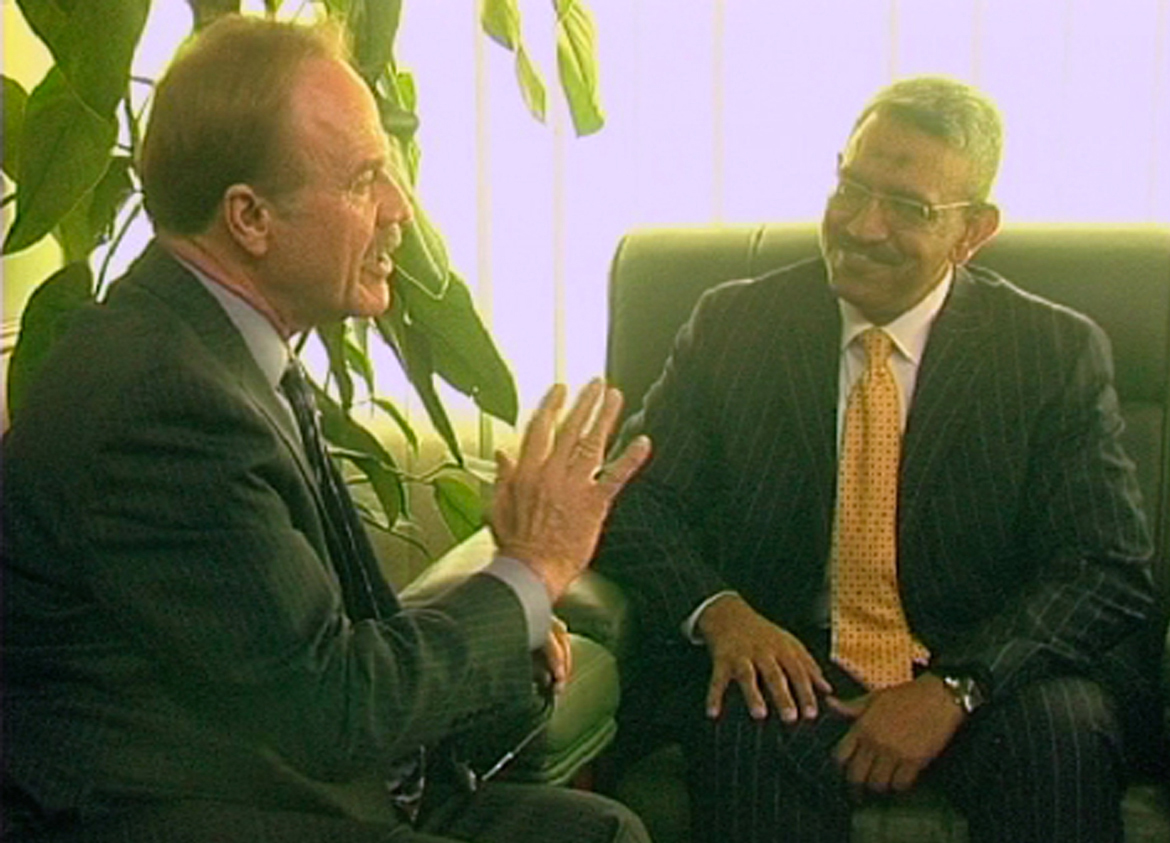
Ambassador of United States of America to Bangladesh Dan Mozina with Ali

=== Member of Parliament ===
The BNP nominated Ali as its candidate for Dhaka-10 (Ramna-Tejgaon) by-polls, and he won the election. Ali took oath as Member of Parliament (MP) from the then Speaker Muhammad Jamiruddin Sircar on 3 July 2004. As an MP, he immediately became active in parliament. In light of Khaleda's two-way loyalty strategy Ali was allowed to contest for the 2004 by-election of the Dhaka-10 constituency when BNP parliamentarian M A Mannan's defection to Bikalpa Dhara Bangladesh meant that the seat was vacant.

== Activities ==
Ali is a member of Dhaka Club, Uttara Club, Kurmitola Golf Club, All Community Club, National Press Club (Bangladesh), Baridhara Cosmopolitan Club, and Dhaka Boat Club. He served as president of Mohammedan Sporting Club Limited, for 16 years. He has founded, under the regulatory control of the Mosaddak Ali Foundation, Abdus Sobhan Madrasa and Orphanage; Ramon Bibi Women Madrasa and Orphanage; Abdul Mannan Degree College, Savar, Dhaka; Shishu Swastho Kendra (Mother and Child Health Centre) Savar, Dhaka; and Mahbuba Child Care Savar, Dhaka.

== Controversies ==
Following the resignation of Iajuddin Ahmed's caretaker government in January 2007 and the ascension of an army-backed caretaker government, Ali was among the first of many to be arrested on corruption charges - he was arrested on 5 February 2007. He was detained when many politicians were arrested. Reporters Without Borders mentioned his name in its report that expressed "Concerns over unfair arrests" after an anti-corruption drive. He was then charged with misuse of the government's relief materials and was jailed for five years in the case. The High Court declared his detention illegal and he was released from the jail. The High Court halted graft cases against Ali. The Supreme Court upheld the High Court verdict that acquitted him from relief embezzlement charges. He was in penal institution on grounds of sleaze between 2007 and 2008. And HC upholds Ali's acquittal in relief scam case. The probe committee of the 2011 share market scam in Bangladesh identified Ali among the 20 individuals involved in masterminding the scam to their personal benefits. The chairman of the investigation committee, Khondokar Ibrahim Khaled denied the allegation. Specific evidences were available against Falu according to the report. The probe committee found Falu, among others, to operate multiple omnibus accounts used to perform the chicanery. However, the Finance Minister AMA Muhith stated that the state would neither disclose the names of the accused officially nor take punitive measures without further investigation.

== Bibliography ==
As an author Ali write seven books. The books are:

- Sohoj Hajj Niyomaboli (2002)
- Al Quran-er Drishtite Manobjibon (2008)
- Al-Lulu Wal Marjan (2012)
- Somriddhir Pothe Bangladesh (2002)
- Somriddhi, Unnoyon O Utpadone Bangladesh (2004)
- Unnoyone Bangladesh (2005)
- Somriddho Bangladesh (2006)
