= Muhammad Khurshid Alam Sarkar =

Bangladeshi judge

Justice of the High Court Division of Bangladesh

Personal details
- Profession: Judge

Muhammad Khurshid Alam Sarkar is a judge on the High Court Division of Bangladesh Supreme Court.

== Early life ==
Sarkar was born on 1 March 1972. He completed his bachelor's degree and master's in law from the University of Dhaka. He also completed a second law degree from the United Kingdom.

== Career ==
Sarkar became a lawyer of the district courts on 1 April 1995.

On 7 March 1996, Sarkar became a lawyer of the High Court Division of Bangladesh Supreme Court.

On 24 August 2010, Sarkar became a lawyer of the Appellate Division of Bangladesh Supreme Court.

Sarkar was appointed an additional judge of the High Court Division of Bangladesh Supreme Court on 20 October 2011.

In November 2012, Sarkar and Justice Naima Haider issued a stay order on the University of Dhaka policy that prevented madrassah students from being admitted into eight departments of the university for three months.

In August 2013, Sarkar temporarily halted the development of Purbachal New Town Project by Rajdhani Unnayan Kartripakkha until it received the clearance from the Department of Environment. Sarkar was made a permanent judge of the High Court Division on 7 October 2013.

Sarker and Justice Mohammad Emdadul Haque rejected a petition that challenged Islam being the state religion of Bangladesh despite a 2011 amendment that restored secularism to the constitution on 7 September 2015.

In March 2020, Sarkar recommended a retired judge be made the head of International Leasing and Financial Services Limited, which had money embezzled by Prashanta Kumar Halder. He also issued an arrest warrant against Halder. In July 2021, he appointed a board of directors and chairperson for the company.

In October 2021, Sarkar appointed a four-member team to manage Evaly, an e-commerce site which was going through financial crises, led by retired judge AHM Shamsuddin Chowdhury Manik.

Justice Muhammad Khurshid Alam Sarkar appointed retired justice AHM Shamsuddin Chowdhury Manik on 3 February 2022 liquidator of Jubilee Bank.
