= A. N. M. Bashir Ullah =

Bangladeshi jurist

The Honourable A. N. M. Bashir Ullah
- আ. ন. ম. বশির উল্লাহ

Justice of the High Court Division of Bangladesh
- Incumbent
- Assumed office 1 December 1981

Personal details
- Born: 31 March 1956 (age 70)
- Education: University of Dhaka
- Profession: Judge

A. N. M. Bashir Ullah is a Bangladeshi justice of the High Court Division, Supreme Court of Bangladesh.

== Early life ==
He was born on 31 March 1956. He obtained his undergraduate degree and master's in law at the University of Dhaka.

== Career ==
He joined the judicial branch of Bangladesh Civil Service on 1 December 1981 as a munsif or Assistant Judge. On 21 October 1997, he was promoted to district and sessions judge.

In March 2006, Sylhet District and Sessions Judge Ullah sentenced a Jamaat-ul-Mujahideen Bangladesh member to death for the bomb attack on Biplob Goswami, a judge of the speedy trial tribunal in Sylhet. As Chittagong district and sessions judge he sentenced twelve defendants to life imprisonment on 20 November 2006 for the murder of Abdus Sobhan on 30 October 1991.

In June 2008, he, then Chittagong metropolitan sessions judge, heard an extortion case against Abu Saleh Mohammed Mofazzal Hoque, former assistant commissioner of the Chittagong Metropolitan Police, and two other police officers.

He ordered the return of the passport of Badruddoza Chowdhury Momen, chairman of BD Foods Limited, after it was seized following his arrest in case over smuggling heroin to the United Kingdom. In May 2009, Justices MA Wahhab Mian and Marzi-ul Huq warned him, then the Dhaka metropolitan sessions judge, about his disparaging comments regarding a verdict of the High Court. He granted bail to Anwar Hossain Manju, chairman of Jatiya Party, in a case over possession of alcohol. He did not grant bail to a suspect who had secured it from the High Court. He apologized for his comments. He sentenced subinspector Mainul Ahsan to two years in jail in a corruption case. On 19 July, Ullah sentenced Dr Afzal Hossain Raj, son of Justice Fazlul Haque, after the Anti-Corruption Commission sued him. He summoned former prime minister Khaleda Zia in the Zia Orphanage case in August. He had also summoned Tarique Rahman. He issued an arrest warrant against Gayeswar Chandra Roy in a case filed by the Anti-Corruption Commission. In September he adjourned the hearing against Giausuddin Al Mamun and transferred the case to the Special Judge's Court-2 in October. In October, he sent the managing director of Rid Pharmaceuticals Limited to jail after refusing his bail petition in case over producing toxic medicine resulting in the death of 28 children. He heard the 2004 Dhaka grenade attack case and extended the deadline for the Criminal Investigation Department to complete their investigation. He heard the trial of 2001 Ramna Batamul bombings.

In January 2010, as judge of the Senior Special Judge's Court, he summoned Abdul Jalil, former general secretary of the Awami League, in a tax evasion case. In March, former state minister of youth Fazlur Rahman Patal sought bail from him. He issued arrest warrants against Arafat Rahman Koko and Fazlur Rahman Patal. In April he summoned four officials of Axiata Bangladesh in a copyright case. On 18 April 2010, Ullah was appointed an additional judge of the High Court Division. He was sworn in with fourteen new judges but the ceremony was boycotted by the Appellate Division. The nominated judges, Justice Ruhul Quddus Babu and justice Md. Khasruzzaman were also not sworn in the ceremony with the other judges.

Ullah was made a permanent judge of the High Court Division on 15 April 2012.

In March 2017, Ullah and Justice Md Miftah Uddin Choudhury warned justices Md Saiful Islam of the Dhaka Cyber Tribunal and Sheikh Mafizur Rahman of the Magura District and Sessions Court for improper adherence to bail rules regarding Information and Communication Technology Act cases. In May, Ullah and Justice Md Miftah Uddin Choudhury halted a sedition case against former prime minister Khaleda Zia. In April, Ullah and Justice Md Miftah Uddin Choudhury halted four other cases against Khaleda Zia. In July, Ullah and Justice Md Miftah Uddin Choudhury granted anticipatory bail to former Justice Md. Joynul Abedin of the Bangladesh Supreme Court after the Anti-Corruption Commission began an investigation against him. Ullah and Justice Md Miftah Uddin Choudhury stayed a case against M. K. Anwar.
