= Krishna Debnath =

Bangladeshi Judge

The Honourable Justice Krishna Debnath
- কৃষ্ণা দেবনাথ

Supreme Court of Bangladesh, Appellate Division
- In office 18 April 2010 – 9 October 2022

Personal details
- Born: October 10, 1955 (age 70)
- Education: University of Rajshahi
- Profession: Judge

Krishna Debnath (born 10 October 1955) is a retired Bangladeshi judge of the Appellate Division, the highest court of Bangladesh. She was the first Hindu women judge in Bangladesh. She is also Bangladesh's first Hindu female judge of the Appellate Division, Supreme Court.

== Early life and education ==
Debnath was born on 10 October 1955. Her father's name is Dinesh Chandra Debnath, who was a judge and law professor at Rajshahi University, and mother's name is Benu Debnath. She passed her LLB and LLM from University of Rajshahi. She joined the judiciary on December 7, 1981, as a 'Munsef' after completing her law studies from Dhaka University. Later, in 1996, she was promoted to district and sessions judge. She was appointed as an additional judge on April 17, 2010. Two years later, on April 17, 2012, she was appointed as a permanent judge of the High Court Division.

== Career ==
Debnath was elevated as additional judge of the High Court Division on 18 April 2010 and appointed judge on 15 April 2012. She appointed at Appellate Division, Supreme Court on 9 January 2022. She retired on 9 October, 2022 after completed her 41-year judicial career.
