= Amar Desh =

Bengali-language daily newspaper in Bangladesh

- Swadhinotar Kotha Bole
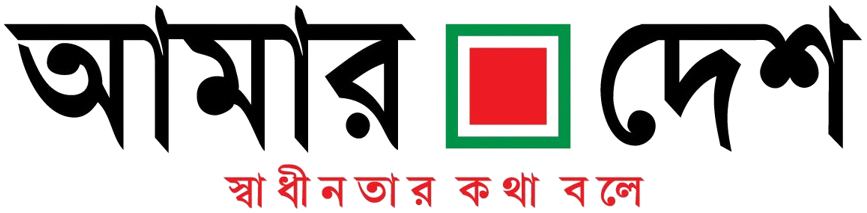
- Type: Daily newspaper
- Format: Broadsheet
- Owner: Amar Desh Publications
- Founder(s): Mosaddak Ali Phalu; Enayetur Rahman Bappi
- Publisher: Mahmudur Rahman
- Editor: Mahmudur Rahman
- Deputy editor: Sultan Mahmud Bin Zulfiqar
- Managing editor: AHM Zahed Chowdhury
- Founded: 2004; 22 years ago
- Relaunched: 22 December 2024
- Language: Bangla
- Headquarters: Dhaka Trade Centre, 99, Kazi Nazrul Islam Avenue, Karwan Bazar-1215, Dhaka
- Country: Bangladesh
- Website: dailyamardesh.com

Amar Desh (Bengali: আমার দেশ, lit. 'My country';) is a newspaper based in Dhaka, Bangladesh. Amar Desh provides news about Bangladesh from local and regional perspectives and covers international news. Amar Desh is considered as a popular newspaper in Bangladesh. The newspaper was closed down in 2010 and again in 2013 by the Awami League administration. After the fall of Sheikh Hasina's government, the newspaper was relaunched on 22 December 2024.

The Awami League government twice closed down the newspaper, and both times its censorship occurred in conjunction with the arrests of editor Mahmudur Rahman. On 1 June 2010, the editor was arrested, and the government shut the newspaper down for 10 days. On 11 April 2013, he was arrested again for publishing the Skype conversations between Mohammed Nizamul Huq, the lead justice of Bangladesh's war crimes trials, and Ahmed Ziauddin, and the suppression of the newspaper was continued by the Awami League government.

== History ==
Mohammad Mosaddek Ali, a former BNP politician, and Enayetur Rahman Bappi, NTV's managing director, officially launched Amar Desh on 23 September 2004. The newspaper was sold in 2008 while Falu was serving a prison term for corruption. Journalist Amanullah Kabir was the editor of Amar Desh before it changed hands. At the time of the management change, Ataus Samad was the acting editor. Mahmudur Rahman and 20 other investors took ownership and formed a new board of directors on 6 October 2008. Rahman became the chairperson of Amar Desh Publications Ltd. Hashmat Ali was listed as publisher. Rahman became acting editor.

=== Shut down and relaunch ===
The Awami League government has shut down Amar Desh twice, both times coinciding with the arrest of its editor, Mahmudur Rahman, and imposed censorship on the newspaper. On 1 June 2010, the editor was arrested, and the government temporarily closed the newspaper for 10 days. On 11 April 2013, Rahman was arrested again after Amar Desh published leaked Skype conversations between the chief justice of Bangladesh's war crimes tribunal and Ahmed Ziauddin, leading to further suppression of the newspaper. The government authority closed this newspaper.

After the fall of the Hasina government, the relaunch process of its print version started again. All necessary approvals, including clearance from the DC office, Department of Films and Publications (DFP), and the Special Branch, have already been obtained to relaunch its print newspaper. Official paperwork has been completed as well. However, due to its long closure, the entire printing press has fallen into disrepair, and much of the equipment has been looted and rendered unusable. As a result, Amar Desh has signed a contract with Al-Falah Printing Press for future print runs.

Regular circulation of the newspaper was again started on 22 December 2024, and their new website was also launched.

In 2010, Rahman described Amar Desh before his arrest: "We are the third largest national daily and have the second largest Internet readership." In 2013, the circulation of Amar Desh rose sharply to 200,000 copies daily. An issue of Amar Desh is sold for 12 taka.

== Editorial focus ==
About the purpose of Amar Desh, Mahmudur Rahman, editor, said,

Our main objective is to wage a battle against corruption, protect our independence and uphold national and people's interest above everything else. ... basically it's a paper for upholding all rights of people and struggling to play an ideal and ideologically sound role of an independent media and all these role will continue in future too.

In 2010, Rahman described Amar Desh's approach: "I have in my journalism exposed the government's record on corruption and human rights abuses extensively." He has also said Amar Desh is against fascism.

== Legal disputes ==
The Observatory for the Protection of Human Rights Defenders and other organisations have said that the Awami League government has conducted "judicial harassment" against Mahmudur Rahman and his paper. In 2010, Reporters Without Borders said that the Awami League party was "clearly unable to tolerate criticism from this opposition newspaper." In 2013, the Committee to Protect Journalists issued a statement expressing concern about "the official harassment" of Amar Desh.

The Awami League party revoked the license of Amar Desh on 1 June 2010. The Bangladesh Police arrested its editor, Mahmudur Rahman, and using police force closed down Amar Desh. The High Court later reversed the government after 10 days, and Amar Desh was allowed to continue publication. Later, the Appellate Division denied the appeal. However, the Supreme Court sentenced Rahman to prison for contempt for a 21 April Amar Desh article, headlined, "Chamber means stay for Government,”চেম্বার মানে সরকার পক্ষে স্টে”for which he served 7 months, This report was written by the then special correspondent of the newspaper, Oliullah Noman. The reporter Oliullah Noman was also sentenced to one month in prison and an additional Tk 10,000 or 1 more week in prison. Noman said, "Though I have no idea about what was wrong with the report, I was jailed." Hashmat Ali, the publisher, was fined Tk 10,000 or 1 week in prison.

On 11 April 2013, Bangladesh police again closed down the Amar Desh newspaper after Rahman's arrest for publishing materials from the Skype conversations, but the Amar Desh was able to distribute a limited edition for the next three days in Dhaka, which led to a government raid on The Daily Sangram. Magistrate Nasrin Sultana filed a suit against Sangram's publisher and editor Abul Asad Saturday for printing issues of Amar Desh. In Bangladesh, the Printing Presses and Publications Act of 1973 requires the printing of newspapers to be registered, and the government had sealed Amar Desh's printing office. Police searched the premises of Sangram in the late evening and confiscated over 6,000 copies of the Amar Desh and then arrested 19 workers. The court sent the printers directly to jail and denied their petitions for a remand and bail. Rahman's mother is the acting head at Amar Desh in Rahman's absence. Information Minister Hasanul Haq Inu said Amar Desh could resume printing from another site once it had an order from Dhaka's magistrate.

According to Amnesty International, over 50 cases have been filed against Amar Desh, Mahmudur Rahman, and the staff. Among them are:

- In April 2013, another Awami League politician, Minister Suranjit Sengupta, sued Amar Desh staff for defamation over a story that appeared in its edition of 31 March 2013. The story alleged that Sengupta had taken bribes from an orphanage, which the minister without portfolio denies.

== Safety and security issues ==
In 2005, Bangladesh police attacked and beat Nayeem Parvez, a photojournalist, and 6 other journalists from other outlets when they were covering a protest about a student who had been killed in a traffic-related accident. Rafiqul Islam, a journalist, was attacked by students of the Jatiyatabadi Chhatra Dal at the Durgapur Press Club in Rajshahi. Zakaria Mahmud and six journalists from other newspapers received death threats in the mail from someone who sent the letters from Bagerhat who did not like the reporting about a member of parliament. Amar Desh editor Ataus Samad also received a death threat in December that had been issued by the Jamatul Mujahideen Bangladesh, an Islamist organisation that had threatened 55 journalists in Bangladesh between September and December 2005.

In 2006, a journalist from the newspaper was among 8 injured by police when a group of journalists was attempting to communicate with the court about BNP attacks on the Dainik Andolaner Bazar newspaper. A member of parliament ordered the beating of Amar Desh journalist Mizanur Rahman Kawser in Comilla before he was turned over to the police and his house was ransacked. An attempt on Amar Desh journalist Ansar Hossain's life was made on account of a crime story he was working on, while Oliullah Noman's life was threatened by a politician from the Nizam-e-Islam Party for writing a critical story that appeared in the newspaper.

In 2007, the building housing NTV, RTV, and Amar Desh, which were all owned at the time by Mosaddek Ali Falu, was burned down killing 3 and injuring around 100, less than one month after his arrest on 5 February. The military-backed caretaker government established curfews in August 2007 and assaulted, detained journalists, including Amar Desh journalist Nesar Ahmed.

In 2010, Mahmudur Rahman was tortured by the Bangladesh Police while in custody after the Awami League government ordered the newspaper shut down. He described his torture to the court:

Your honour, please save my life. I am not supposed to be alive after the level of torture I have experienced at the cantonment police station. I was blindfolded and stripped by five men in the lock-up. I fainted after they pressed me on the chest and back."

This followed his arrest, in which 200 police were used to forcibly close down Amar Desh.

In 2013, photojournalist Mir Ahmed Miru was injured while covering clashes between the Shahbag protesters and the followers of the Jamat-e-Islami party. In all, 26 journalists and bloggers were reported injured in various incidents.

== Notable works ==
=== Aminul Islam ===
Amar Desh published on 6 April 2012 the photograph of a man whose identity was unknown at the time and who had been murdered and found by the Tangail police. From the published photo in Amar Desh, the family was able to recognise him and then identified him as labour organiser Aminul Islam. Islam's murder is still unsolved, but his case gained international attention from AFL-CIO and the US State Department.

=== Skype controversy ===
The Economist and Amar Desh both published leaked conversations between the head justice of Bangladesh's International Crimes Tribunal, Nizamul Huq and international lawyer Ahmed Ziauddin in December 2012. The Economist was the first to report about the inappropriate contacts. Amar Desh staff reporter Oliullah Noman said "a foreign source" had given the material to the newspaper. Huq resigned from the ICT on 11 December 2012 as a result. On 13 December, the Bangladesh court prohibited media from publishing the Skype conversations: "Recording of a private conversation, if the persons don't know about it, is an offence. Publishing of such recorded conversation is thus inevitably the outcome of that offence." The New Age reported that Amar Desh published the materials until the court ruled that they should be withheld from public consumption. After reporting on the story for Amar Desh, Noman left Bangladesh for the United Kingdom and wanted political asylum there because of what he said resulting in threats made by Bangladesh's government. Editor Mahmudur Rahman was charged with sedition on 13 December 2012 and lawyers argued that Amar Desh should be shut down. Rahman was arrested 11 April 2013 and remanded for 13 days, and the case against him is ongoing.

=== Open letter ===
It published an open letter by Shah Ahmad Shafi named An Open Letter from Shah Ahmad Shafi to the Government and the Public, which initiated the response to the Shahbag protests.

== Controversies ==
=== Fabricated news about Mecca Imams ===
On 6 December 2012, Amar Desh published an article called Imams form human chain against oppression of Alems. The word "Alems" is used for Muslim scholars. The article was about Muslim leaders in Mecca who protested against the focus on Muslims by war crimes court in Bangladesh. However, a blogger attempted to verify the photos and news from Arabic websites and reported that the news from those sites were about something else. Dainik Sangram later pulled its story and issued an apology. The Amar Desh newspaper also removed the online version of the news item without correction or comment.

== See also ==
- List of newspapers in Bangladesh
- Censorship in Bangladesh
