= Murder of Gopal Krishna Muhuri =

2001 murder in Bangladesh

Gopal Krishna Muhuri was the principal of Nazirhat College in Chittagong, Bangladesh, who was murdered in his home in 2001. The Daily Star described the case as "sensational".

== Background ==
The Four Party Alliance led by Bangladesh Nationalist Party and Jamaat-e-Islami Bangladesh came to power five weeks before the incident. Widespread violation of the rights of minorities and attacks on them took place within a month of the government coming to power.

== Incident ==
Gopal Krishana Muhuri was the principal of Nazirhat College in Chittagong city, a Hindu, and a former member of Mukti Bahini. He had banned Islami Chattra shibir in his college. He was murdered inside his home in Jamal Khan Road, Chittagong on 16 November 2001. Multiple gunmen had stormed his house and shot him while he was reading the morning newspaper. He was 60 at the time of his death. His death led to protests by Bangladesh Chhatra League, Bangladesh Jubo League, and the Bangladesh Hindu Buddhist Christian Unity Council.

== Trial ==
His family filed a murder case against 12 people. On 3 February 2003, Speedy Trial Tribunal in Chittagong sentenced four people to death and four others to life-term imprisonment. An accused died on 29 June 2004 in a gunfight with "criminals". On 2 March 2005 another of the accused was killed in a gunfight with Rapid Action Battalion. Two other accused, Prof Jahirul Haque and Prof Tofazzal Ahamad also died during the trial process. In July 2006 Bangladesh High Court confirmed the death sentence of Nasir alias Gittu Nasir, Azam, Alamgir Kabir alias Baitta Alamgir, and Tasleem Uddin Montu. It also confirmed the life imprisonment of Mohi Uddin and Habib Khan; both absconded during the verdict. Saiful Islam alias Chhoto Saiful and Shahjahan were acquitted in the verdict. Eight of the accused were members of Islami Chattra shibir and three were professors in the college.
