= Abu Bakar Siddiquee =

Bangladeshi judge

Justice of the High Court Division of Bangladesh

Personal details
- Profession: Judge

Abu Bakar Siddiquee is a retired justice of the Appellate Division of the Bangladesh Supreme Court.

== Career ==
Siddiquee and Justice Md Shamsul Huda scrapped a three-year prison term for AKM Shamim Osman, former Awami League member of parliament, in a corruption case. In May, Siddiquee and Justice Md Shamsul Huda asked Mockbul Hossain, former Awami League member of parliament, to surrender to the trial court related to a corruption case. Siddiquee and Justice Md Shamsul Huda squashed the frigate purchase corruption case against Prime Minister Sheikh Hasina filed in 2003 by the Bureau of Anti Corruption.

Siddiquee and Justice Md Shamsul Huda squashed the Niko corruption case against Prime Minister Sheikh Hasina filed in 2007 by the Anti-corruption Commission. Siddiquee and Justice Md Shamsul Huda squashed the Bangladesh Export Processing Zones Authority corruption case against Prime Minister Sheikh Hasina filed in 2001 by the Bureau of Anti-Corruption related to the appointment of lobbyist in Washington D.C. for the authority. Siddiquee and Justice Md Shamsul Huda squashed a case against Sheikh Selim, former Awami League member of parliament and cousin of Prime Minister Sheikh Hasina, for attacking a motorcade of former Prime Minister Khaleda Zia in 2001 in Keraniganj.

Siddiquee and Justice Md Shamsul Huda granted bail to Sheikh Helal, former Awami League member of parliament and cousin of Prime Minister Sheikh Hasina, and his wife in two cases related to corruption and extortion. In June 2010, Siddiquee and Justice Md Shamsul Huda granted anticipatory bail to Ahmed Akbar Sobhan, chairman of Bashundhara Group, in seven criminal cases.

On 8 October 2018, Siddiquee was appointed to the Appellate Division of the Bangladesh Supreme Court along with Justice Zinat Ara and Justice Md Nuruzzaman.

Siddiquee retired from the Appellate Division of the Bangladesh Supreme Court on 29 July 2021.

In January 2023, Siddiquee was appointed member of the Bangladesh Law Commission.

== Personal life ==
Siddiquee's younger brother, Hasan Foez Siddique, served as the 23rd chief justice of Bangladesh.
