= AHM Shamsuddin Chowdhury Manik =

Bangladeshi judge

- এ.এইচ.এম শামসুদ্দিন চৌধুরী মানিক
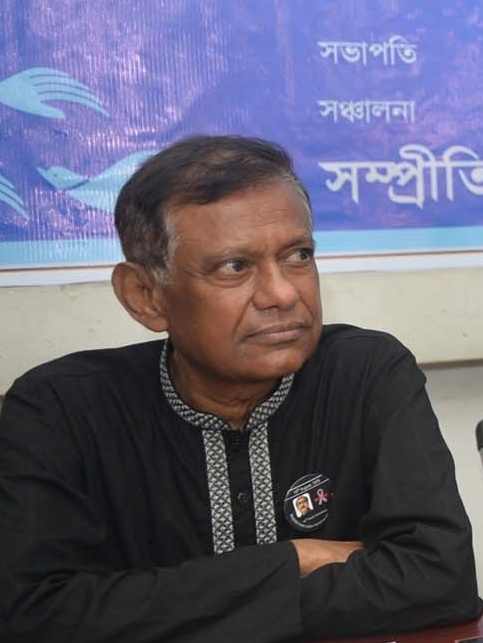
- Manik in 2019

Retired Judge of the Appellate Division of Bangladesh
- In office 31 March 2013 – 1 October 2015

Personal details
- Relatives: K. M. Shamsul Huda (brother-in-law)
- Profession: Judge

Abul Hossain Mohammed Shamsuddin Chowdhury Manik is a retired judge of the Appellate Division of Bangladesh. He drew controversy after submitting verdicts in cases after his retirement, making questionable remarks on television as well as criminal misconduct.

== Career ==
Mr Manik was born in Munshiganj (Bikrampur) Manik started his legal career in 1978 as a lawyer in the Bangladesh High Court. He was appointed the deputy attorney general of Bangladesh in 1996. On 3 July 2001, he was appointed by the Bangladesh Awami League government to the Bangladesh High Court as an additional judge. The Bangladesh Nationalist Party, which came to power in 2001, did not confirm his appointment.

On 2 March 2009, Manik was reinstated to the court, along with 11 other additional judges, following a High Court verdict in their favour. On 25 March, he was appointed as a full judge to the Bangladesh High Court by the Awami League government, which came to power in 2009. In 2012, the Jatiya Sangsad passed a unanimous resolution condemning Manik and accusing him of violating the constitution. Awami League leader, Tofail Ahmed, called him a sadist. He was accused of forcing traffic sergeants to do sit up while holding their ears in court for not saluting the car of a high court judge. He also accused Manik of forcefully sitting in business class seats when he bought economy class tickets through the misuse of his position. On 31 March 2013, he was promoted to the Appellate Division of the Supreme Court. He superseded 21 judges who were his senior. Mahmudur Rahman, the editor of Amar Desh, called for his removal.

Manik retired on 1 October 2015. He was removed from the bench on orders from Surendra Kumar Sinha, Chief Justice of Bangladesh. He had secretly recorded a conversation between him and Sinha, and published the conversation in The Daily Janakantha. Supreme Court Bar Association in a vote decided against hosting a farewell for Manik, and the Attorney General Office also decided against a farewell ceremony. It was a departure from the tradition of holding farewell ceremony for retiring senior judges. The Bar accused Manik of not signing judgements or writing them, and sending 14 lawyers to jail. He sought the impeachment of Sinha from the President Abdul Hamid after he was removed him from the bench.

On 22 February 2016, SM Zulfiqur Ali, lawyer of the Supreme Court, filed a petition with Bangladesh High Court seeking a media gag order on statements by Manik. He accused Manik of undermining the judiciary of Bangladesh. The petition was rejected by the Bangladesh High Court.

=== Post-retirement ===
Manik submitted 65 orders and judgements after his retirement on 10 February 2016. According to him, he still had 20 judgements and orders pending. Justice Imman Ali was ordered to examine the judgements and Justice Md. Abdul Wahhab Miah was ordered to scrutinise them. Manik also faced criticism for holding a press conference on the Bangladesh Supreme Court premises on 1 October 2015, against rules of the court, where he asked the Chief Justice to accept pending judgements from him after retirement. The chief justice asked him to send all the judgements and documents to the Supreme Court's registrar general's office and not hold press conferences.

On 28 April 2016, the Bangladesh Supreme Court decided to rehear 161 cases in which judgements were provided by Manik after his retirement. This was done following a judgement by Chief Justice Surendra Kumar Sinha, that declared verdicts given after retirement were unconstitutional. He criticised Sinha after a dispute developed between the Government of Bangladesh and Sinha. The Supreme Court ultimately decided to rehear only few of the 161 cases as necessary.

Manik was physically assaulted in Bethnal Green, London, in October 2015. His daughter, Nadia Choudhury, accused the attackers of being members of the Bangladesh Nationalist Party. On 16 March 2017, a defamation case was filed against him following his criticism of Justice Sinha in the media. The case was dismissed by the court on 4 December 2017. He is a dual citizen of the United Kingdom and Bangladesh. He taught constitutional law at the University of London.

In October 2021, Sarkar appointed a four-member team to manage Evaly, an e-commerce site which was going through financial crises, led by Manik. But the committee led by him failed to do anything positive and significant. The board resigned from Evaly in September 2022.

In February 2022, Justice Muhammad Khurshid Alam Sarkar appointed Manik as the liquidator of Jubilee Bank.

In October 2023, Manik demanded the expulsion of US Ambassador Peter Haas accusing him for interfering in the country's internal affairs.

== Controversies ==
In 2003, Manik accused traffic police officers of contempt of court for not saluting his car. The Inspector General of Bangladesh Police, Shahudul Haque, issued a rejoinder that said traffic police are under no obligations to salute anyone and they could do so if it was safe. Bangladesh High Court bench of Justice M A Matin and Justice Syed Refat Ahmed issued a contempt of court charge against Haque which automatically removed him from the post of Inspector General according to the law. The government of Bangladesh secured a presidential pardon that protected Haque's job.

In 2012, Manik was accused of 29 allegations including buying three houses in London with a total of only 32,000 pounds and the source of the income was not disclosed. He had bought one more property which was not even disclosed in the tax records.

=== Remarks on quota reform and non-cooperation movements ===
In July 2024, Manik participated as a guest in the talk show To the Point on Channel i, which focused on the 2024 Bangladesh quota reform movement. During the discussion, he became agitated with the host, Dipti Chowdhury, and repeatedly expressed his anger towards her throughout the program. Before leaving the studio after the show, he referred to Chowdhury as a 'child of a Razakar'. In August 2024, a complaint was filed against Manik in a court in Noakhali for derogatory remarks against former President and Bangladesh Nationalist Party founder Ziaur Rahman, whom he called "a spy for Pakistan".

On 23 August 2024, He was apprehended by the Border Guard Bangladesh (BGB) while attempting to flee to India through an illegal border crossing in Kanaighat, Sylhet Division. He was handed over to Kanaighat police in the early hours of 24 August. In a court in Sylhet, Manik alleged that he had been robbed by his accomplices during the escape attempt. As he was being brought to court for a hearing on 24 August, Manik was assaulted by angry agitators in the premise, resulting in him being hospitalised due a critical condition, including a ruptured testicle.

== Personal life ==
Manik is the son of Abdul Hakim Chowdhury. Justice Manik married twice and has a daughter, Nadia Choudhury, from his first marriage and two sons from his second marriage.
