= Mohammad Mamtaj Uddin Ahmed =

Bangladeshi judge

Justice of the High Court Division of Bangladesh

Personal details
- Profession: Judge

Mohammad Mamtaj Uddin Ahmed, also spelled Momtaz Uddin Ahmed, is a retired Justice of the High Court Division of the Bangladesh Supreme Court. He is a former chairperson of Bangladesh Press Council.

== Career ==
Ahmed was appointed additional Judge of the High Court Division near the end of the Awami League government term in 2001. Despite the recommendation of the chief justice, Ahmed and other judges appointed by the Awami League government were not made permanent judges of the High Court Division by the newly elected Bangladesh Nationalist Party breaking tradition. Ten of the judges, including Ahmed, filed an appeal with the High Court Division which ordered the government to make the ten permanent judges with seniority in 2008.

In February 2010, Ahmed and Justice Naima Haider ordered a halt to the eviction drive in Shahidertek slum in Sher-e Bangla Nagar following a petition by Ain O Salish Kendra and four residents.

Ahmed was reappointed chairperson of the Bangladesh Press Council for a two-year term in August 2017. In September 2017, Ahmed was included in the Press Appellate Board which included Golam Sarwar. He proposed the development of a nationwide database of journalists. He and the Press Council visited the shrine of President Sheikh Mujibur Rahman in August 2020.

In February 2022, Ahmed's name was proposed for the post of commissioner of the Bangladesh Election Commission.
