= Mohammed Nizamul Huq =

Bangladeshi judge (born 1950)

Mohammed Nizamul Huq Nassim

Justice of the High Court Division

Personal details
- Born: 15 March 1950 (age 76)
- Parent(s): Nurul Huq (father) and Asia Khatun (mother)
- Education: Patuakhali Government Jubilee High School
- Occupation: Judge
- Known for: his tenure on the International Crimes Tribunal

Mohammed Nizamul Huq Nassim (born 15 March 1950), (Anglicized also as: Nizamul Haque Nasim or as Nizamul Haque Nizam) was a judge of the High Court Division of the Supreme Court of Bangladesh. He is the incumbent Chairman of Bangladesh Press Council. He chaired the panel of three judges that presided over the Bangladesh International Crimes Tribunal until his resignation on 11 December 2012.

== Personal history ==
Nizamul Huq is the son of Nurul Huq, his father, and Asia Khatun, his mother. He attended the Patuakhali Government Jubilee High School in the Patuakhali District.

== Career ==
Nizamul Huq was a treasurer and lawyer for the Bangladesh human rights organisation Odhikar (Anglicized also as Adhikar) before joining the High Court.

Nizamul Huq was first appointed judge of the High Court by President Shahabuddin Ahmed, a former Chief Justice of the Supreme Court. Nizamul Huq was reappointed to the High Court by President Zillur Rahman, on 24 March 2009.

Nizamul Huq was a member of the Secretariat of the People's Commission, which prepared evidence in 1994 before the tribunal about the defendants, over whom Huq would later preside, and he later deliberated on the report as evidence during the war crimes trials. Afterward, he was appointed as the head of the International Crimes Tribunal on 25 March 2010, and he resigned amid a controversy on 11 December 2012 after his Skype calls with Ahmed Ziauddin were revealed by Amar Desh and The Economist. He was replaced by Fazle Kabir. Afterward he rejoined the High Court and hears civil cases.

== The Skype controversy ==
Nizamul Huq resigned his position for "personal reasons" and shortly after the release of the full 17 hours of Skype conversations and 230 emails between himself and Ziauddin to news sources. From December 2012 until March 2013, it was unknown who had obtained access to the Skype conversations and emails or how those materials were obtained, although the publishers of the content were first suspected. In 2013, journalist David Bergman reported that he had learned that Nizamul Huq had transferred his entire computer drive over multiple computers and a US-based security firm said people with legal access to those drives gave its agents the files. In the New Age article, Bergman quotes James Mulvaney, who is from Guardian Consulting LLC and the private security firm that was given the materials by an unnamed source, says:

... those who provided the company's operatives with copies of the material did not break the law as it came 'from people with legal access to any number of hard drives on which the evidence was stored and was/is available. We did not hack his computer'

The company said it had been paid $100,000 by a client who questioned the neutrality of Bangladesh's International Crimes Tribunal. The war crimes court accused The Economist and Amar Desh of "hacking" Nizamul Huq's computers.

The Economist said in its article "The trial of the birth of a nation" (12 December 2012) that it would not normally publish private correspondence, denied that it had paid for the materials and acknowledged issues of press ethics, but it cited "public interest" behind its decision. The magazine wrote, "These emails, if genuine, would indeed raise questions about the working of the court and we are bound to investigate them as fully as we can." It further wrote about its coverage of the cache,"There is a risk not only of a miscarriage of justice affecting the individual defendants, but also that the wrongs which Bangladesh has already suffered will be aggravated by the flawed process of the tribunal. That would not heal the country's wounds, but deepen them." The court called the UK magazine's article on the Skype conversation "interference" and a "violation" of privacy and ordered its representatives to appear before the court in Bangladesh to answer for contempt of court.

The further publication of verbatim quotes from the Skype conversations between Nizamul Huq and Ahmed Ziauddin by the Bangladesh newspaper Amar Desh revealed government intervention into the judiciary and Bangladesh's International Crimes Tribunal, which Nizamul Huq led. Nizamul Huq said in the widely available video (as quoted from Foreign Policy magazine, 21 December 2012) that the Awami League-led government is "absolutely crazy for a judgment. The government has gone mad. They have gone completely mad, I am telling you. They want a judgment by 16th December... It's as simple as that." Later in the video, he admits that he publicly met with an appointed minister from the government and was pressured by that minister for quick verdicts. Nizamul Huq said, the minister "came to visit me this evening. He asked me to pass this verdict fast. I told him 'how can I do that?'... He said, 'Try as quick as you can.'" The newspaper Amar Desh also published emails from Nizamul Huq to Ziauddin. A sedition charge was filed on 14 December 2012 against Amar Desh editor Mahmudur Rahman. The government arrested Mahmudur Rahman, editor of the Amar Desh on 11 April 2013 for sedition and cyber crimes involving the Skype videos and their publication in his newspaper.

In December 2012, the court by order suppressed the media from publishing materials or accounts of those Skype conversations. According to news sources, the videos of the conversations between Nizamul Huq and Ziauddin were posted to YouTube.
