= List of Independence Award recipients (2010–2019) =

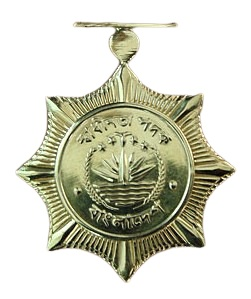
List of Independence Day Award recipients
- 1977–1979
- 1980–1989
- 1990–1999
- 2000–2009
- 2010–2019
- 2020–2029

Independence Award, Bangladesh's highest civilian honours - Winners, 2010-2019:

== 2010 ==
Ten people and an organisation were awarded. as below:

Recipients	Area	Note
AKM Samsul Haque Khan	independence & liberation war	posthumous
Syeda Sajeda Chowdhury	independence & liberation war	
Belal Muhammad	independence & liberation war	
Prof Zillur Rahman Siddiqui	education	
Jatin Sarker	education	
Romena Afaz	Literature	posthumous
Mustafa Nurul Islam	Literature	
Waheedul Haq	culture	posthumously
Alamgir Kabir	culture	posthumous
Ferdousi Priyabhashini	culture	
Bangla Academy	culture	

== 2011 ==
Two institutions and seven people were awarded .

Recipients	Area	Note
Dhaka University	education	organization
Bangladesh Police	liberation war	organization
Gaus Khan	liberation war	posthumous
Sanghraj Jyotipal Mahathero	liberation war	posthumous
Dr Nilima Ibrahim	liberation war	posthumous
Air Vice Marshal (retd) Abdul Karim Khandaker	liberation war	
Nutan Chandra Singha	liberation war	posthumous
AKM Samsuzzoha	liberation war	posthumous
Muhammad Abul Hashem Khan	culture	

== 2012 ==
Ten people received the award.

Recipients	Area	Note
lieutenant commander Moazzem Hossain	liberation war	posthumous
Abul Kalam Shamsuddin	liberation war	posthumous
Syeda Badrun Nahar Chowdhury	liberation war	
Noyeem Gahar	liberation war	
Bazlur Rahman	journalist	posthumous
Rafiqul Islam	education	
Abul Fazal	literature	posthumous
Pran Gopal Datta	medical science	
Kazi M Badruddoza	agricultural science	
Quamrul Haider	science and technology	

== 2013 ==
The award was given to eight people.

Recipients	Area	Note
Mohammad Shamsul Haque	liberation war	posthumous
Mohammad Mosharraf Hossain	liberation war	
Kazi Sazzad Ali	liberation war	
Abdul Hamid Miah	research on agriculture	
Swadesh Ranjan Bose	economics	posthumous
Satya Saha	culture	posthumous
M. A. Hannan	liberation war	posthumous
Abdul Hamid	liberation war	

== 2014 ==
Nine people and one institution were awarded.

Recipients	Area	Note
Mohammad Abul Khayer	independence and liberation war	posthumous
Munsi Kabir Uddin Ahmed	independence and liberation war	posthumous
Kazi Azizul Islam	independence and liberation war	posthumous
Lt Col (retd) Abu Osman Chowdhury	independence and liberation war	posthumous
Khasruzzaman Chowdhury	independence and liberation war	posthumous
Shahid SBM Mizanur Rahman	independence and liberation war	posthumous
Mohammad Haris Ali	independence and liberation war	posthumous
M Quamruzzaman	education	
Qayyum Chowdhury	culture	
Bangladesh Agricultural Research Institute (BARI)	research and training	

== 2015 ==
The award was given to eight people.

Recipients	Area	Note
Manik Chowdhury	Independence and Liberation War	posthumous
Mamun Mahmud	Independence and Liberation War	posthumous
Shah A M S Kibria	Independence and Liberation War	posthumous
Mozaffar Ahmed		posthumous
Anisuzzaman	Literature	
Abdur Razzak	Culture	
Mohammad Hossain Mondol	Research	
Santosh Gupta	Journalism	posthumous

== 2016 ==
The award was given to fourteen people and one organization.

Recipients	Area	Note
Abul Maal Abdul Muhith	Independence and Liberation War	Finance minister of Bangladesh
Emaz Uddin Pramanik	Independence and Liberation War	Textiles and Jute Minister of Bangladesh
Moulavi Asmat Ali Khan	Independence and Liberation War	posthumous
Badrul Alam	Independence and Liberation War	Squadron Leader, Bir Uttam, formed Bangladesh Air Force
Shahid Shah Abdul Mazid	Independence and Liberation War	Prevented the attack on Rajshahi Police Lines by the Pakistan occupation force
M Abdul Ali	Independence and Liberation War	posthumous; Administrator of Rangamati killed by Pakistani military force attack
AKM Abdur Rouf	Independence and Liberation War	posthumous; typographer of the constitution
KM Shehabuddin	Independence and Liberation War	posthumous; first diplomat to resign from Pakistani Foreign Service and pledge allegiance to Bangladesh; first head of Bangladesh's New Delhi mission
Syed Hasan Imam	Independence and Liberation War	cultural activities during the Liberation War
Rafiqul Islam	Mother Language	posthumous
Abdus Salam	Mother Language	Achieving recognition of 21 February as International Mother Language Day
Maqsudul Alam	Science and Technology	Posthumous; decoded the jute genome
Mohammad Rafi Khan	Medical Science	
Rezwana Choudhury Bannya	Cultural	
Nirmalendu Goon	Literature	
Bangladesh Navy		

== 2017 ==
The award was given to fifteen people and an organization.

Recipients	Area	Note
Group Captain (retd) Shamsul Alam Bir Uttam	independence and liberation war	
Ashraful Alam	independence and liberation war	
Mohammad Nazmul Haque	independence and liberation war	posthumous
Syed Mohsin Ali	independence and liberation war	posthumous
NM Nazmul Ahsan	independence and liberation war	posthumous
Faizur Rahman Ahmed	independence and liberation war	posthumous
Bangladesh Air Force	independence and liberation war	
Professor AHM Touhidul Anowar Chawdhury	medical science	
Rabeya Khatun	literature	
Golam Samdani Koraishi	literature	
Enamul Huq	culture	
Bazlur Rahman Badal	culture	
Khalil Kazi OBE	social service	
Shamsuzzaman Khan	research and training	
Professor Lalit Mohan Nath	research and training	posthumous
Professor Mohammad Asaduzzaman	public administration	posthumous

== 2018 ==
Eighteen people were awarded.

Recipients	Area	Note
Quazi Zakir Hasan	independence and liberation war	posthumous
SMA Rashidul Hasan	independence and liberation war	posthumous
Sankar Govinda Chowdhury	independence and liberation war	posthumous
Sultan Mahmud	independence and liberation war	
M Abdur Rahim	independence and liberation war	posthumous
Bhupati Bhushan Chowdhury	independence and liberation war	posthumous
Lieutenant Mohammad Anwarul Azim	independence and liberation war	posthumous
Humayun Rashid Choudhury	independence and liberation war	posthumous
Amanullah Asaduzzaman	independence and liberation war	posthumous
Matiur Rahman Mallik	independence and liberation war	posthumous
Sergeant Zahrul Haq	independence and liberation war	posthumous
Amzadul Haq	independence and liberation war	
AK M D Ahsan Ali	medicine	
AK Azad Khan	social service	
Selina Hossain	literature	
M Abdul Mazid	food security	
Asaduzzaman Noor	culture	
Shykh Seraj	agricultural journalism	

== 2019 ==
Thirteen people and an organization were awarded.

Recipients	Area	Note
Mufazzal Haider Chaudhury	independence and liberation war	posthumous
ATM Zafar Alam	independence and liberation war	posthumous
AKM Mozammel Haque	independence and liberation war	
Khandaker Mosharraf Hossain	independence and liberation war	
Kazi Misbahun Nahar	independence and liberation war	
Abdul Khalek	independence and liberation war	posthumous
Mohammad Khaled	independence and liberation war	posthumous
Shaukat Ali Khan	independence and liberation war	posthumous
Nurunnahar Fatema Begum	medical science	
Qazi Kholiquzzaman Ahmad	social service	
Murtaja Baseer	culture	
Hasan Azizul Huq	literature	
Haseena Khan	research and training	
Bangladesh Institute of Nuclear Agriculture (BINA)	science and technology	
