= 2014 in Bangladesh =

- Centuries: 20th; 21st
- Decades: 1990s; 2000s; 2010s; 2020s
- See also: Other events of 2014; List of years in Bangladesh

2014 (MMXIV) was a common year starting on Wednesday of the Gregorian calendar, the 2014th year of the Common Era (CE) and Anno Domini (AD) designations, the 14th year of the 3rd millennium and the 21st century, and the 5th year of the 2010s decade.

The year 2014 was the 43rd year after the independence of Bangladesh. It was also the first year of the third term of the Government of Sheikh Hasina.

== Incumbents ==
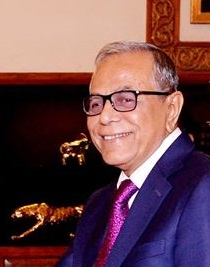
Abdul
Hamid

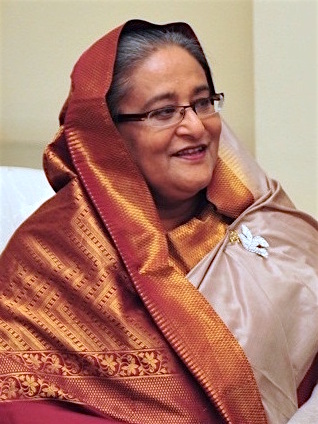
Sheikh
Hasina

- President: Abdul Hamid
- Prime Minister: Sheikh Hasina
- Chief Justice: Md. Muzammel Hossain

== Demography ==
Demographic Indicators for Bangladesh in 2014
Population, total	154,517,385
Population density (per km^{2})	1187.0
Population growth (annual %)	1.1%
Male to Female Ratio (every 100 Female)	102.9
Urban population (% of total)	33.5%
Birth rate, crude (per 1,000 people)	19.5
Death rate, crude (per 1,000 people)	5.6
Mortality rate, under 5 (per 1,000 live births)	40
Life expectancy at birth, total (years)	71.2
Fertility rate, total (births per woman)	2.2

== Climate ==
Climate data for Bangladesh in 2014
Month	Jan	Feb	Mar	Apr	May	Jun	Jul	Aug	Sep	Oct	Nov	Dec	Year
Daily mean °C (°F)	16.8 (62.2)	18.8 (65.8)	24.3 (75.7)	28.3 (82.9)	28.6 (83.5)	28.0 (82.4)	28.5 (83.3)	27.9 (82.2)	27.8 (82.0)	26.4 (79.5)	22.5 (72.5)	18.3 (64.9)	24.7 (76.5)
Average precipitation mm (inches)	0.7 (0.03)	35.6 (1.40)	14.0 (0.55)	61.5 (2.42)	173.9 (6.85)	333.0 (13.11)	385.1 (15.16)	474.1 (18.67)	335.7 (13.22)	57.8 (2.28)	0.9 (0.04)	0.5 (0.02)	1,872.8 (73.75)
Source: Climatic Research Unit (CRU) of University of East Anglia (UEA)

=== Flood ===
Continuous rainfall in north and northeastern Bangladesh caused flash floods in low-lying and densely populated areas in August. By the beginning of September, the number of affected people increased to 2.8 million. Bogra, Kurigram, Jamalpur, Netrokona, Lalmonirhat, Gaibandha, Naogaon, Brahmanbaria, and Mymensingh were the affected districts.

== Economy ==
Key Economic Indicators for Bangladesh in 2014
National Income
	Current US$	Current BDT	% of GDP
GDP	$172.9 billion	BDT13.4 trillion	
GDP growth (annual %)	6.1%		
GDP per capita	$1,118.9	BDT86,959	
Agriculture, value added	$26.5 billion	BDT2.1 trillion	15.4%
Industry, value added	$45.5 billion	BDT3.5 trillion	26.3%
Services, etc., value added	$92.7 billion	BDT7.2 trillion	53.6%
Balance of Payment
	Current US$	Current BDT	% of GDP
Current account balance	$0.8 billion		.4%
Imports of goods and services	$45.2 billion	BDT3.4 trillion	25.5%
Exports of goods and services	$33,057.2 million	BDT2.6 trillion	19.0%
Foreign direct investment, net inflows	$2,539.2 million		1.5%
Personal remittances, received	$14,987.5 million		8.7%
Total reserves (includes gold) at year end	$22,319.8 million		
Total reserves in months of imports	5.6		

Note: For the year 2014 average official exchange rate for BDT was 77.64 per US$.

== Events ==
- 5 January - General election in Bangladesh goes on per schedule in spite of boycott from the major opposition parties. The incumbent Bangladesh Awami League won the election with a safe majority, winning 234 seats.
- 9 February - The owners of Tazreen Fashions, Delwar Hossain and his wife Mahmuda Akter, hand themselves in to face charges of murder in relation to the death of 112 workers in a factory fire in Dhaka in November 2012.
- 15 May - A ferry sinks on the Meghna River in Munshiganj District resulting in at least 12 deaths and hundreds missing.
- 16 May - The ferry that sank on the Meghna River's death toll increased to 25.
- 17 May - Officials call off rescue operations as 54 dead bodies recovered with an unknown number of people missing in a ferry disaster in the Meghna River.
- 8 July - The United Nations Permanent Court of Arbitration rules in favour of Bangladesh in a border dispute with India over the Bay of Bengal.
- 4 August - A ferry carrying about 200 passengers capsizes on the Padma River in Munshiganj District.
- 5 August - Rescuers struggle to locate a sunken ferry in the Padma River leaving at least two people dead and many more missing.
- 27 August - Popular Islamic preacher and TV personality Nurul Islam Farooqi killed by unknown assailants in 2014.
- 20 October - A collision between two buses on the Dhaka-Rajshahi highway leaves at least 30 people dead.

=== Awards and Recognitions ===
==== Independence Day Award ====
Recipients	Area	Note
Mohammad Abul Khayer	independence and liberation war	posthumous
Munsi Kabir Uddin Ahmed	independence and liberation war	posthumous
Kazi Azizul Islam	independence and liberation war	posthumous
Lt Col (retd) Abu Osman Chowdhury	independence and liberation war	posthumous
Khasruzzaman Chowdhury	independence and liberation war	posthumous
Shahid SBM Mizanur Rahman	independence and liberation war	posthumous
Mohammad Haris Ali	independence and liberation war	posthumous
M Quamruzzaman	education	
Qayyum Chowdhury	culture	
Bangladesh Agricultural Research Institute (BARI)	research and training	

==== Ekushey Padak ====
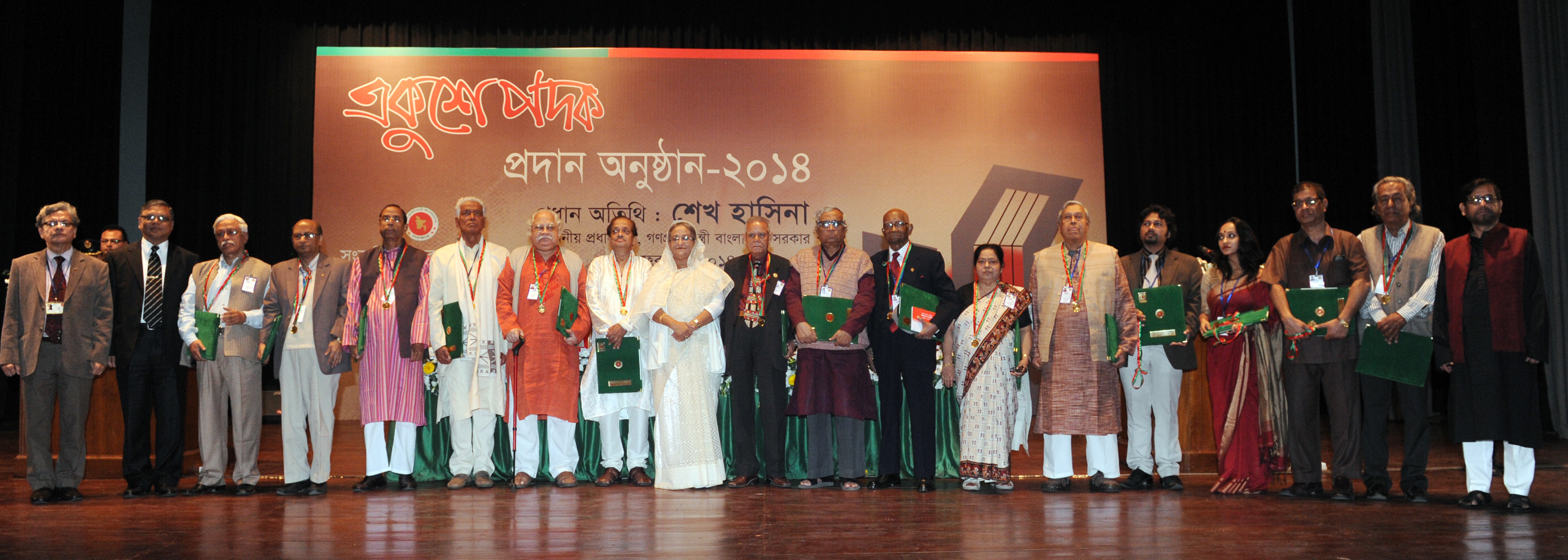
Winners of Ekushey Padak 2014

1. Badrul Alam, Language Movement (posthumous)
2. Biprodas Barua, language and literature
3. Belal Chowdhury, language and literature
4. Jamil Chowdhury, language and literature
5. Samarjit Roy Chowdhury, arts
6. Ramkanai Das, arts
7. Rashid Haider, language and literature
8. Shamsul Huda, Language Movement
9. Enamul Huq, research
10. Keramat Moula, arts
11. Mujibur Rahman, social service
12. Golam Sarwar, journalism
13. Anupam Sen, education
14. Abdus Shakur, language and literature (posthumous)
15. SM Solaiman, arts (posthumous)

=== Sports ===
- Asian Games:
  - Bangladesh participated in the 2014 Asian Games in Incheon, South Korea from 19 September to 4 October. A total of 137 athletes from Bangladesh participated in 14 sports. Bangladesh won 3 medals - all in team events. The women's cricket team won silver while men's cricket and kabaddi team won bronze medals.
- Commonwealth Games:
  - Bangladesh participated at the 2014 Commonwealth Games in Glasgow, Scotland. Abdullah Baki won silver medal in Men's Shooting (10 metre air rifle) event.
- Domestic football:
  - Sheikh Jamal Dhanmondi Club won Premier League title while Abahani Dhaka became runner-up.
- Cricket:
  - Sri Lanka toured Bangladesh in January and February 2014 playing two Test Matches, three One Day Internationals and two Twenty20 Internationals. Sri Lanka won every match, with the exception of the second Test match which ended in a draw.
  - Bangladesh hosted the Asia Cup for the second consecutive time from 24 February to 7 March 2014. The tournament featured Afghanistan, Bangladesh, India, Pakistan and Sri Lanka.
  - Bangladesh hosted the men's and women's World Twenty20 from 15 March to 7 April 2014 in Dhaka, Chittagong and Sylhet.
  - The Indian national cricket team toured Bangladesh from 15 to 19 June 2014 to play a three-match One Day International (ODI) series against the Bangladesh national cricket team. India won the One Day International series 2–0, with one match being abandoned.
  - The Bangladesh national cricket team toured the West Indies from August to September 2014 for a tour consisting of two Test matches, three Limited Overs International (LOI) matches and one Twenty20 International. Bangladesh did not win any match on the tour.
  - Zimbabwe toured Bangladesh from 26 October to 1 December 2014, playing three Test matches and five One Day International matches. Bangladesh won the Test series 3–0 and the ODI series 5–0.
- Field Hockey:
  - Bangladesh hosted the fourth edition of the Men's Junior AHF Cup - the qualification tournament for the men's Hockey Junior Asia Cup organized by the Asian Hockey Federation at Maulana Bhasani Hockey Stadium in Dhaka from 30 November to 7 December 2014. Bangladesh won the tournament for the first time and qualified together with Oman for the 2015 Junior Asia Cup.

== Deaths ==
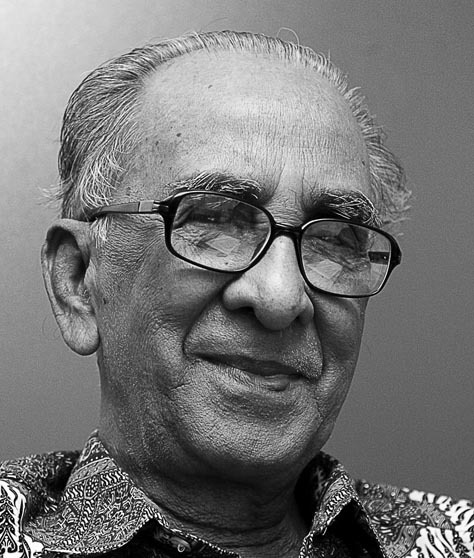
Muhammad Habibur Rahman

- 11 January - Muhammad Habibur Rahman, former Chief Justice and Chief Adviser of the 1996 caretaker government (b. 1928)
- 9 February
  - AKM Yusuf, politician (b. 1926)
  - Fazal Shahabuddin, poet (b. 1926)
- 10 February - Rangalal Sen, national professor (b. 1933)
- 9 April - A. B. M. Musa, journalist (b. 1931)
- 10 June - Abdul Karim Shah, folk singer (b. 1927)
- 15 June - Fazlul Karim, academician (b. 1925)
- 29 June - Abul Hussain, poet (b. 1922)
- 31 August - Abdul Alim, politician and convicted war criminal (b. 1930)
- 5 September - Ramkanai Das, folk singer (b. 1935)
- 9 September - Firoza Begum, singer (b. 1930)
- 3 October - Kazi Morshed, film director (b. 1950)
- 23 October - Ghulam Azam, Islamist politician and convicted war criminal (b. 1922)
- 10 November - Syed Mainul Hossain, architect (b. 1952)
- 11 November - Zillur Rahman Siddiqui, author and educationist (b. 1928)
- 30 November - Qayyum Chowdhury, painter (b. 1932)
- 7 December - Khalil Ullah Khan, actor (b. 1934)
- 20 December - Maqsudul Alam, scientist (b. 1954)

== See also ==
- 2010s in Bangladesh
- List of Bangladeshi films of 2014
- 2013–14 Bangladeshi cricket season
- 2014–15 Bangladeshi cricket season
- Timeline of Bangladeshi history
