= 2012 in Bangladesh =

- Centuries: 20th; 21st
- Decades: 1990s; 2000s; 2010s; 2020s
- See also: Other events of 2012; List of years in Bangladesh

2012 (MMXII) was a leap year starting on Sunday of the Gregorian calendar, the 2012th year of the Common Era (CE) and Anno Domini (AD) designations, the 12th year of the 3rd millennium and the 21st century, and the 3rd year of the 2010s decade.

The year 2012 was the 41st year after the independence of Bangladesh. It was also the fourth year of the second term of the Government of Sheikh Hasina.

== Incumbents ==
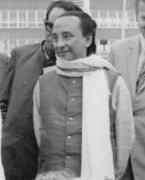
Zillur
Rahman

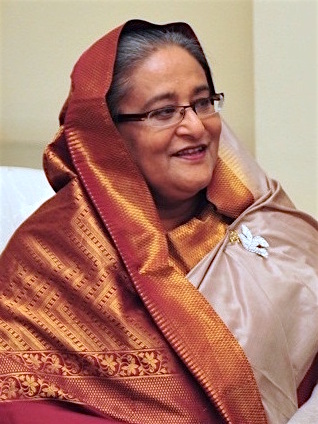
Sheikh
Hasina

- President: Zillur Rahman
- Prime Minister: Sheikh Hasina
- Chief Justice: Md. Muzammel Hossain.

== Demography ==
Demographic Indicators for Bangladesh in 2012
Population, total	151,005,733
Population density (per km^{2})	1160.1
Population growth (annual %)	1.2%
Male to Female Ratio (every 100 Female)	103.1
Urban population (% of total)	32.0%
Birth rate, crude (per 1,000 people)	20.2
Death rate, crude (per 1,000 people)	5.6
Mortality rate, under 5 (per 1,000 live births)	44
Life expectancy at birth, total (years)	70.6
Fertility rate, total (births per woman)	2.2

== Climate ==
Climate data for Bangladesh in 2012
Month	Jan	Feb	Mar	Apr	May	Jun	Jul	Aug	Sep	Oct	Nov	Dec	Year
Daily mean °C (°F)	16.8 (62.2)	19.9 (67.8)	25.6 (78.1)	26.6 (79.9)	28.8 (83.8)	28.5 (83.3)	28.0 (82.4)	28.3 (82.9)	27.9 (82.2)	26.2 (79.2)	23.2 (73.8)	19.4 (66.9)	25.0 (77.0)
Average precipitation mm (inches)	17.5 (0.69)	2.5 (0.10)	29.7 (1.17)	196.2 (7.72)	273.6 (10.77)	260.1 (10.24)	487.5 (19.19)	354.1 (13.94)	256.2 (10.09)	176.7 (6.96)	23.0 (0.91)	20.5 (0.81)	2,097.6 (82.59)
Source: Climatic Research Unit (CRU) of University of East Anglia (UEA)

=== Flood and landslides ===
Floods and landslides caused by heavy rain starting from 23 June significantly affected ten districts in the country's northern and south-eastern parts, including the districts of Bandarban, Cox's Bazar, Chittagong, Sylhet, Sunamganj, Kurigram, Gaibandha and Jamalpur. Official statistics as of 31 July reported 131 deaths.

== Economy ==
Key Economic Indicators for Bangladesh in 2012
National Income
	Current US$	Current BDT	% of GDP
GDP	$133.4 billion	BDT10.6 trillion	
GDP growth (annual %)	6.5%		
GDP per capita	$883.1	BDT69,878	
Agriculture, value added	$21.6 billion	BDT1.7 trillion	16.2%
Industry, value added	$33.8 billion	BDT2.7 trillion	25.3%
Services, etc., value added	$70.9 billion	BDT5.6 trillion	53.2%
Balance of Payment
	Current US$	Current BDT	% of GDP
Current account balance	$2.6 billion		1.9%
Imports of goods and services	$37.7 billion	BDT2.9 trillion	27.9%
Exports of goods and services	$27,591.1 million	BDT2.1 trillion	20.2%
Foreign direct investment, net inflows	$1,584.4 million		1.2%
Personal remittances, received	$14,119.6 million		10.6%
Total reserves (includes gold) at year end	$12,754.2 million		
Total reserves in months of imports	3.9		

Note: For the year 2012 average official exchange rate for BDT was 81.86 per US$.

== Events ==
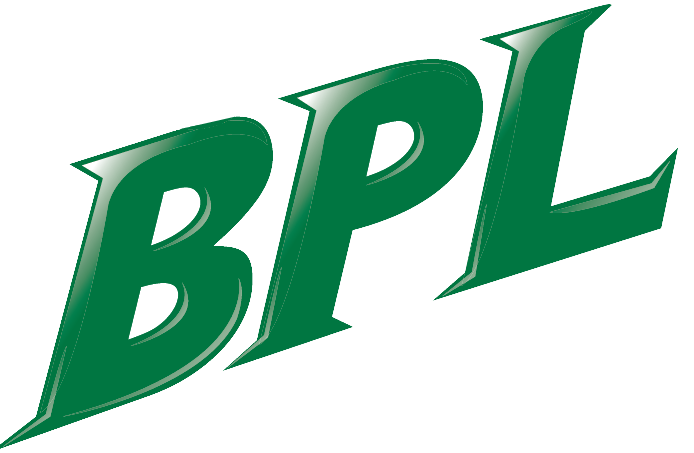
Bangladesh Premier League was launched in 2012

- 18 January – Bangladesh Army claimed to have foiled a coup d'état attempt.
- 9 February – President of Bangladesh Zillur Rahman launched the first session of Bangladesh Premier League during an opening ceremony held at the Sher-e-Bangla Cricket Stadium in Dhaka.
- 11 February – Two well-known, married Bangladeshi journalists, named Sagar Sarowar and Meherun Runi, were stabbed to death for a yet to be determined motive in their Dhaka apartment.
- 13 March – A double decker ferry capsized after colliding with a cargo ship on Meghna River, killing at least 110 people.
- 5 April – Dead body of trade unionist Aminul Islam was recovered from a road near Ghatail. Islam's murder is still unsolved, but his case gained international attention from AFL–CIO and the US State Department.
- 20 October - Indian photographer Robin Sengupta is awarded " Friend of Liberation " medal.
- 24 November – A fire at the Tazreen Fashion factory in the Ashulia region on the outskirts of Dhaka, killed at least 117 people.
- 24 November – Three steel girders of a flyover collapsed in the suburb of Bahaddarhat in Chittagong, killing at least 13 people and injuring around 50.
- 9 December – A 24-year-old tailor in Dhaka, named Biswajit Das, was murdered by members of the Bangladesh Chhatra League (BCL), the student wing of the governing Awami League party.

=== Awards and recognitions ===
==== International recognition ====
- Syeda Rizwana Hasan, a lawyer promoting environment protection, was awarded Ramon Magsaysay Award.

==== Independence Day Award ====
Recipients	Area	Note
lieutenant commander Moazzem Hossain	liberation war	posthumous
Abul Kalam Shamsuddin	liberation war	posthumous
Syeda Badrun Nahar Chowdhury	liberation war	
Noyeem Gahar	liberation war	
Bazlur Rahman	journalist	posthumous
Rafiqul Islam	education	
Abul Fazal	literature	posthumous
Pran Gopal Datta	medical science	
Kazi M Badruddoza	agricultural science	
Quamrul Haider	science and technology	

==== Ekushey Padak ====
1. Humayun Azad, language and literature (posthumous)
2. Mubinul Azim, fine arts (posthumous)
3. Mumtaz Begum, Language Movement (posthumous)
4. Baren Chakraborthi, science and technology
5. Ehtesham Haydar Chowdhury, journalism (posthumous)
6. Karunamoy Goswami, fine arts
7. Enamul Haque, fine arts
8. A.K. Nazmul Karim, education (posthumous)
9. Monsur Alam Khan, education
10. Suddhananda Mahathero, social work
11. Tareque Masud, fine arts (posthumous)
12. Habibur Rahman Milon (journalism)
13. Ashfaque Munier, journalism (posthumous)
14. Mamunur Rashid, fine arts
15. Ajoy Kumar Roy, education

=== Sports ===
- Olympics:
  - Bangladesh sent a delegation to compete in the 2012 Summer Olympics in London, United Kingdom. Bangladesh did not win any medals in the competition.
- Football:
  - Dhaka Abahani Limited won the Premier League.
- Cricket:
  - Dhaka Gladiators won the inaugural edition of BPL.
  - In March, Bangladesh hosted the 2012 Asia Cup which featured the four Test-playing nations from Asia: Bangladesh, India, Pakistan and Sri Lanka. Pakistan won the tournament by beating Bangladesh in the final by 2 runs.
  - The West Indies cricket team toured Bangladesh in November and December. The tour consisted of two Test matches, five One Day Internationals and one Twenty20 match. West Indies won both Test matches and the Twenty20 while Bangladesh won the ODI series 3–2.

== Deaths ==
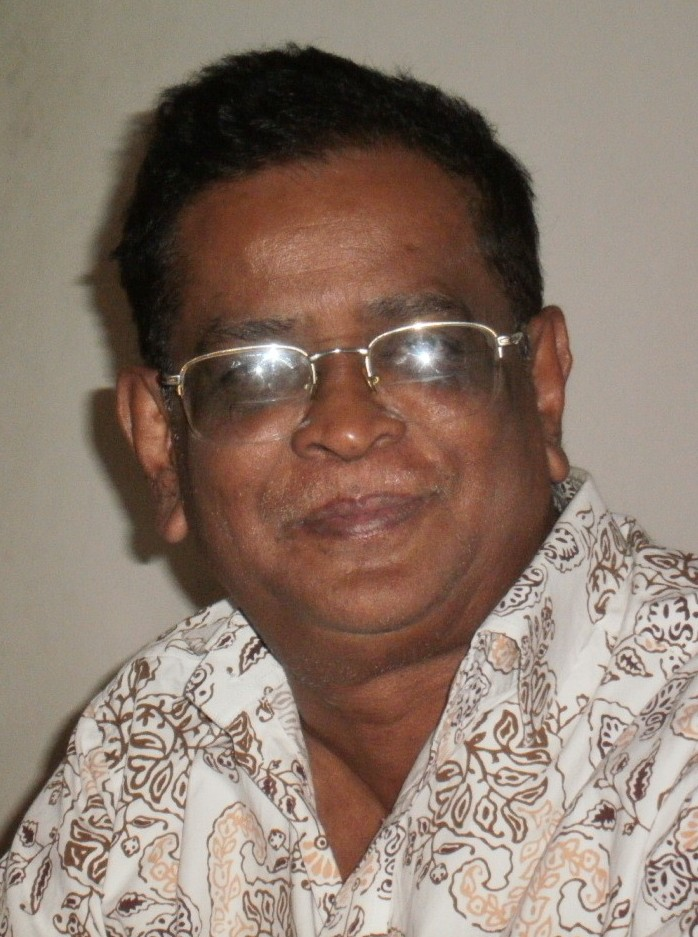
Humayun Ahmed

- 31 January – Siddika Kabir, nutritionist, cook (b. 1931)
- 13 February – Humayun Faridi, actor (b. 1952)
- 9 May – Chinghla Mong Chowdhury Mari, footballer (b. 1938)
- 20 May – Sultana Zaman, actor (b. 1935)
- 9 July – Humayun Ahmed, writer and filmmaker (b. 1948)
- 15 July – Muzharul Islam, architect (b. 1923)
- 10 September – Muslehuddin Ahmad, educationist, diplomat (b. 1930s)
- 26 September – Ataus Samad, journalist (b. 1936)
- 8 October – Bidit Lal Das, folk singer, composer (b. 1938)
- 29 November – Bijon Sarkar, photographer (b. 1935)
- 8 December – Khan Sarwar Murshid, educationist, diplomat (b. 1924)
- 10 December – Iajuddin Ahmed, 13th president of Bangladesh (b. 1931)

== See also ==
- 2010s in Bangladesh
- List of Bangladeshi films of 2012
- 2011–12 Bangladeshi cricket season
- 2012–13 Bangladeshi cricket season
- Timeline of Bangladeshi history
