= 2015 in Bangladesh =

- Centuries: 20th; 21st
- Decades: 1990s; 2000s; 2010s; 2020s
- See also: Other events of 2015; List of years in Bangladesh

2015 (MMXV) was a common year starting on Thursday of the Gregorian calendar, the 2015th year of the Common Era (CE) and Anno Domini (AD) designations, the 15th year of the 3rd millennium and the 21st century, and the 6th year of the 2010s decade.

The year 2015 was the 44th year after the independence of Bangladesh. It was also the third year of the third term of the Government of Sheikh Hasina.

== Incumbents ==
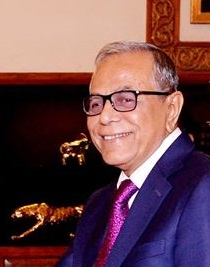
Abdul
Hamid

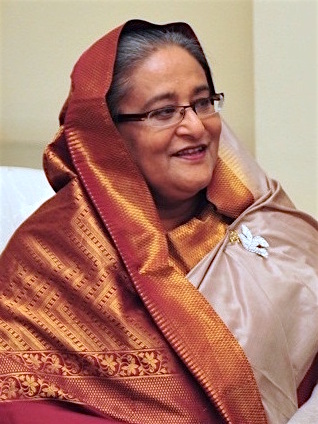
Sheikh
Hasina

- President: Mohammad Abdul Hamid
- Prime Minister: Sheikh Hasina
- Chief Justice: Md. Muzammel Hossain (until 16 January), Surendra Kumar Sinha (starting 17 January)

== Demography ==
Demographic Indicators for Bangladesh in 2015
Population, total	156,256,287
Population density (per km^{2})	1200.4
Population growth (annual %)	1.1%
Male to Female Ratio (every 100 Female)	102.8
Urban population (% of total)	34.3%
Birth rate, crude (per 1,000 people)	19.2
Death rate, crude (per 1,000 people)	5.5
Mortality rate, under 5 (per 1,000 live births)	38
Life expectancy at birth, total (years)	71.5
Fertility rate, total (births per woman)	2.1

== Climate ==
Climate data for Bangladesh in 2015
Month	Jan	Feb	Mar	Apr	May	Jun	Jul	Aug	Sep	Oct	Nov	Dec	Year
Daily mean °C (°F)	17.4 (63.3)	20.2 (68.4)	24.4 (75.9)	26.1 (79.0)	28.4 (83.1)	28.3 (82.9)	27.8 (82.0)	28.1 (82.6)	28.1 (82.6)	26.7 (80.1)	23.1 (73.6)	18.4 (65.1)	24.8 (76.6)
Average precipitation mm (inches)	10.4 (0.41)	22.3 (0.88)	22.3 (0.88)	245.1 (9.65)	179.6 (7.07)	878.9 (34.60)	566.6 (22.31)	493.4 (19.43)	321.7 (12.67)	86.6 (3.41)	5.1 (0.20)	5.9 (0.23)	2,837.9 (111.74)
Source: Climatic Research Unit (CRU) of University of East Anglia (UEA)

== Economy ==
Key Economic Indicators for Bangladesh in 2015
National Income
	Current US$	Current BDT	% of GDP
GDP	$195.1 billion	BDT15.2 trillion	
GDP growth (annual %)	6.6%		
GDP per capita	$1,248.5	BDT97,007	
Agriculture, value added	$28.8 billion	BDT2.2 trillion	14.8%
Industry, value added	$52.3 billion	BDT4.1 trillion	26.8%
Services, etc., value added	$104.8 billion	BDT8.1 trillion	53.7%
Balance of Payment
	Current US$	Current BDT	% of GDP
Current account balance	$2.6 billion		1.3%
Imports of goods and services	$45.6 billion	BDT3.8 trillion	24.7%
Exports of goods and services	$34,969.3 million	BDT2.6 trillion	17.3%
Foreign direct investment, net inflows	$2,831.2 million		1.5%
Personal remittances, received	$15,295.5 million		7.8%
Total reserves (includes gold) at year end	$27,493.1 million		
Total reserves in months of imports	6.8		

Note: For the year 2015 average official exchange rate for BDT was 77.95 per US$.

== Events ==
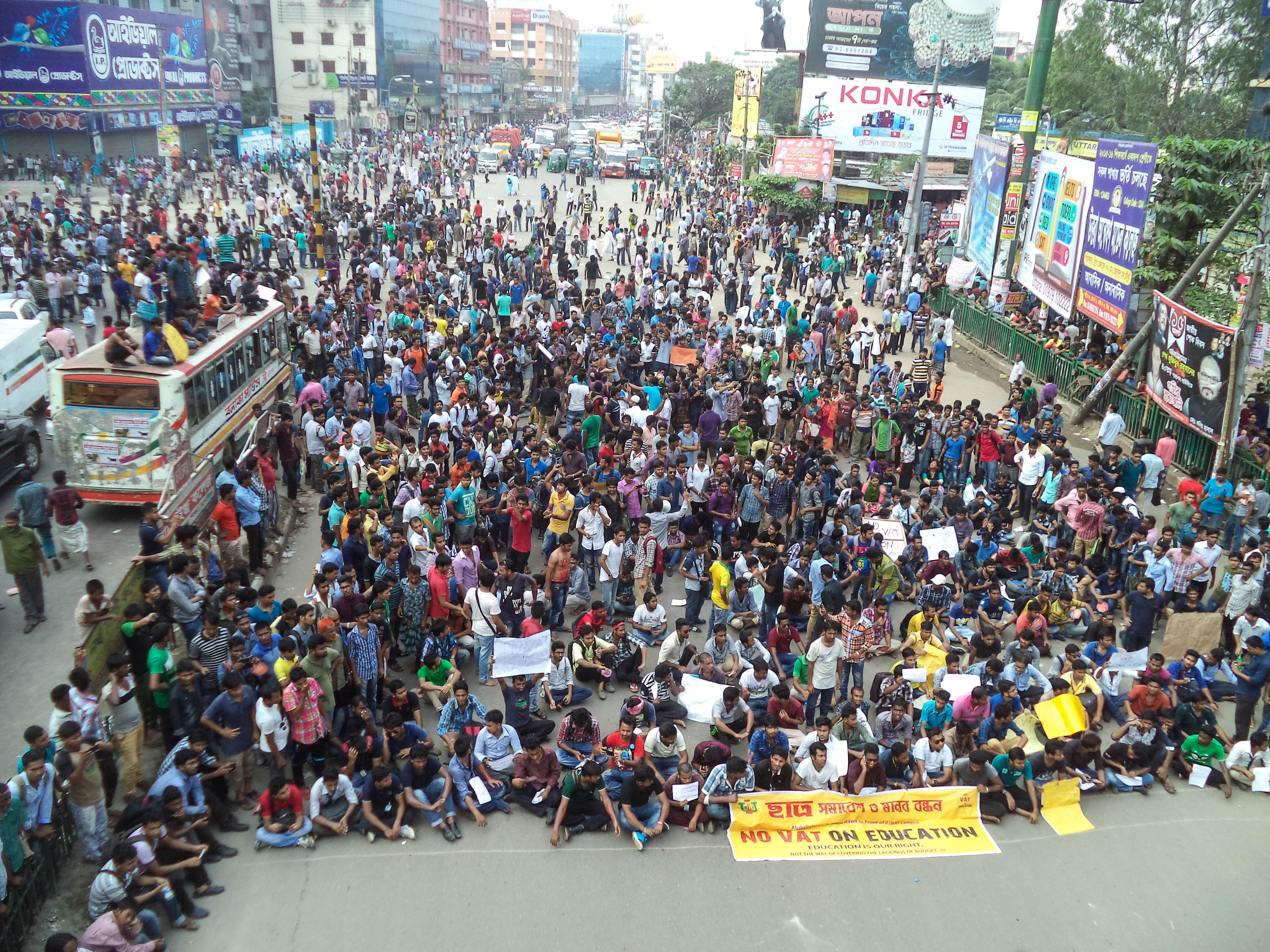
Private university students in Uttara, Dhaka protest VAT on tuition fees.

- 5 January – Bangladeshi police report that two opposition Bangladesh Nationalist Party activists are shot dead in clashes with members of the ruling Awami League in the town of Natore on the first anniversary of disputed general election.
- 3 February – In Chuddogram, anti-government protesters firebomb a bus full of sleeping passengers, leaving seven people dead.
- 22 February – A ferry carrying 100 passengers capsizes in the Padma River after colliding with a trawler, resulting in the death toll reaching 41.
- 25 February – An arrest warrant is issued for Khaleda Zia, former Prime Minister of Bangladesh, after she fails to show up to face graft charges.
- 27 February – Avijit Roy, an American writer and blogger from Bangladesh, is hacked to death by Islamist attackers in Dhaka.
- 6 March – Customs officers at the Shahjalal International Airport catch Son Young Nam, a North Korean diplomat trying to smuggle an estimated $1.4 million worth of gold into Bangladesh. Bangladesh authorities release him.
- 30 March – Another blogger, Washiqur Rahman, was killed in the Tejgaon neighborhood of Dhaka in an attack similar to that perpetrated on Avijit Roy. The police arrested two suspects near the scene and recovered meat cleavers from them.
- 11 April – Bangladeshi Jamaat-e-Islami leader Muhammad Kamaruzzaman is executed for war crimes committed during the 1971 Liberation War.
- 12 May – Bangladeshi secular blogger Ananta Bijoy Das is cut to pieces by a masked gang wielding machetes in the city of Sylhet. He is the third secular blogger to be killed in Bangladesh this year.
- 29 May- PM Sheikh Hasina is rewarded with the title "Deshratna" by "Jatiyo Nagorik Committee" head Syed Shamsul Haq at Suhrawardy Udyan.
- 8 July – Thirteen-year-old Sheikh Mohammad Samiul Alam Rajon is lynched in the vicinity of Kumargaon Bus Stand, Sylhet, for allegedly trying to steal a rickshaw van.
- 7 August – A gang of about six men armed with machetes attacks Niloy Chatterjee, a blogger, at his home in the Goran neighborhood of Dhaka and hacks him to death.
- 25–26 August – 2015 Bangladesh–Arakan Army border clash, The Bangladesh Army fends off Arakan Army intruders near the Bangladesh–Myanmar Border causing the intruders to flee.
- 6 September – Parliament passes the Financial Reporting Act 2015.
- 14 September – Proposed 10% VAT on higher education was withdrawn by the cabinet in the aftermath of protests by students of private universities in Bangladesh.
- 31 October – Faisal Arefin Dipan, the publisher of Jagriti Prakashani, was hacked to death in Dhaka. The attack followed another stabbing, earlier the same day, in which publisher Ahmedur Rashid Chowdhury and two writers, Ranadeep Basu and Tareque Rahim, were stabbed in their office at another publishing house. The three men were taken to hospital, and at least one was reported to be in critical condition.
- 22 November – Two top Bangladeshi war criminals are hanged.

=== Awards and recognitions ===
==== International recognition ====
- Sir Fazle Hasan Abed, Founder of BRAC, wins the World Food Prize.

==== Independence Day Award ====
Recipients	Area	Note
Manik Chowdhury	Independence and Liberation War	posthumous
Mamun Mahmud	Independence and Liberation War	posthumous
Shah A M S Kibria	Independence and Liberation War	posthumous
Mozaffar Ahmed		posthumous
Anisuzzaman	Literature	
Abdur Razzak	Culture	
Mohammad Hossain Mondol	Research	
Santosh Gupta	Journalism	posthumous

==== Ekushey Padak ====
1. Abdur Rahman Boyati, arts (posthumous)
2. Arup Ratan Choudhury, social service
3. Jharna Dhara Chowdhury, social service
4. SA Abul Hayat, arts
5. Mohammad Nurul Huda, language and literature
6. Kamal Lohani, journalism
7. MA Mannan, education
8. Satya Priya Mahathero, social service
9. Mujibur Rahman Devdas, Liberation War
10. Faridur Reza Sagar, mass media
11. Sanat Kumar Saha, education
12. Pearu Sardar, Language Movement (posthumous)
13. ATM Shamsuzzaman, arts
14. Dwijen Sharma, language and literature
15. Abul Kalam Mohammed Zakaria, research

=== Sports ===
- Football:
  - Bangladesh participated in 2015 SAFF Championship held in India. They secured their only victory against Bhutan and exited the tournament from the group stage.
  - After a hiatus of 6 years, the 3rd edition of the Bangabandhu Cup was hosted by Bangladesh in early 2015 with six nations participating. Malaysia U-23 won the third edition, after beating Bangladesh U-23 in the final. This was also the first time the host reached the final of this tournament.
  - Bangladesh youth team then secured the third place in the 1st edition of the SAFF U-20 Championship, an international football competition for men's under-19 national teams organized by SAFF. The tournament was hosted by Nepal from 20 to 29 August.
- Cricket:
  - Pakistan toured Bangladesh from 15 April to 10 May, to play one Twenty20 International (T20I), three One Day Internationals (ODIs) and two Test matches. Pakistan won the Test series 1–0 after the first Test was drawn, but Bangladesh won the ODI series 3–0, its first ever series win against Pakistan; and Bangladesh also won the sole Twenty20 International played.
  - Then the Indian cricket team toured Bangladesh from 10 to 24 June. The tour consisted of one Test match and three One Day International (ODI) matches. Because of the series taking place during monsoon season, each ODI had a reserve day allocated. The one-off Test finished in a draw and Bangladesh won the ODI series 2–1.
  - Later the South African cricket team toured Bangladesh for a two-match International Twenty20 (T20I) series, a three-match One Day International (ODI) series and two Test matches against the Bangladesh national team from 3 July to 3 August. South Africa won Twenty20 International series by 2–0, while, Bangladesh won ODI series by 2–1. The Test series finished with both matches being drawn.
  - The Zimbabwean cricket team toured Bangladesh in November to play 3 ODIs and 2 T20s. Bangladesh secured victory in the ODI series 3–0, but the T20 series was tied 1–1.

== Deaths ==
- 3 January – Jamal Uddin Ahmad politician (b. 1929)
- 5 January – Mizan Rahman, mathematician (b. 1932)
- 5 January – Mustafa Kamal, former Chief Justice (b. 1933)
- 15 January – Anwarul Iqbal former IGP of Police and advisor to caretaker government (b. 1950)
- 24 January – Arafat Rahman, son of former President Ziaur Rahman and former Prime Minister Khaleda Zia (b. 1969)
- 11 April – Muhammad Kamaruzzaman, politician, convicted war-criminal (b. 1952)
- 5 May – Novera Ahmed, sculptor (b. 1939)
- 18 May – Hasanuzzaman Khan, journalist (b. 1926)
- 1 June – Serajur Rahman, journalist and broadcaster (b. 1934)
- 7 June – Sheikh Razzak Ali, politician (b. 1928)
- 29 June – Mujibur Rahman, scientist
- 8 July – Amjad Khan Chowdhury, entrepreneur (b. 1937)
- 27 August – Kazi Zafar Ahmed, politician (b. 1939)
- 14 September – Syed Mohsin Ali, politician (b. 1948)
- 26 October – Dilip Barua, footballer (b. 1946)
- 14 November – A. K. M. Nurul Islam, politician (b. 1919)
- 20 November – Chowdhury Sajjadul Karim, scientist and former advisor to caretaker government (b. 1948)
- 22 November – Ali Ahsan Mohammad Mojaheed, politician and convicted war criminal (b. 1948)
- 22 November – Salahuddin Quader Chowdhury, politician and convicted war criminal (b. 1949)
- 3 December – Omar Ali, poet (b. 1939)

== See also ==
- 2010s in Bangladesh
- List of Bangladeshi films of 2015
- 2014–15 Bangladeshi cricket season
- 2015–16 Bangladeshi cricket season
- Timeline of Bangladeshi history
