= 2016 in Bangladesh =

- Centuries: 20th; 21st
- Decades: 1990s; 2000s; 2010s; 2020s
- See also: Other events of 2016; List of years in Bangladesh

2016 (MMXVI) was a leap year starting on Friday of the Gregorian calendar, the 2016th year of the Common Era (CE) and Anno Domini (AD) designations, the 16th year of the 3rd millennium and the 21st century, and the 7th year of the 2010s decade.

The year 2016 was the 45th year after the independence of Bangladesh. It was also the third year of the third term of the Government of Sheikh Hasina.

== Incumbents ==
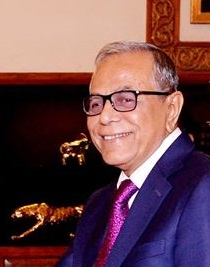
Abdul
Hamid

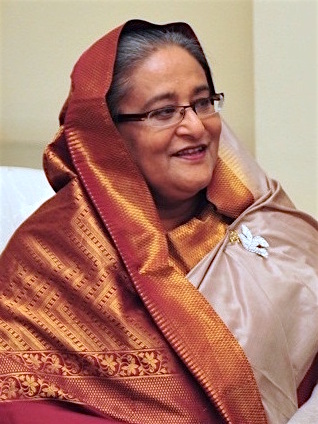
Sheikh
Hasina

- President: Mohammad Abdul Hamid
- Prime Minister: Sheikh Hasina
- Chief Justice: Surendra Kumar Sinha

== Demography ==
Demographic Indicators for Bangladesh in 2016
Population, total	157,977,151
Population density (per km^{2})	1213.6
Population growth (annual %)	1.1%
Male to Female Ratio (every 100 Female)	102.7
Urban population (% of total)	35.1%
Birth rate, crude (per 1,000 people)	18.8
Death rate, crude (per 1,000 people)	5.5
Mortality rate, under 5 (per 1,000 live births)	36
Life expectancy at birth, total (years)	71.8
Fertility rate, total (births per woman)	2.1

== Climate ==
Climate data for Bangladesh in 2016
Month	Jan	Feb	Mar	Apr	May	Jun	Jul	Aug	Sep	Oct	Nov	Dec	Year
Daily mean °C (°F)	17.1 (62.8)	21.9 (71.4)	25.6 (78.1)	28.0 (82.4)	27.7 (81.9)	28.8 (83.8)	28.0 (82.4)	28.6 (83.5)	28.3 (82.9)	27.5 (81.5)	22.9 (73.2)	19.8 (67.6)	25.4 (77.7)
Average precipitation mm (inches)	7.1 (0.28)	14.4 (0.57)	47.5 (1.87)	107.1 (4.22)	249.1 (9.81)	267.9 (10.55)	590.9 (23.26)	384.8 (15.15)	250.1 (9.85)	155.5 (6.12)	46.5 (1.83)	1.5 (0.06)	2,122.4 (83.57)
Source: Climatic Research Unit (CRU) of University of East Anglia (UEA)

=== Cyclone ===
An animation depicting Roanu nearing landfall over Bangladesh.

On 21 May, Cyclone Roanu made landfall near Chittagong, Bangladesh. A storm surge up to 7 ft (2.0 m) above the astronomical tide hit the coast of Bangladesh at afternoon. The cyclone approached the land over the coast at Sandwip, Hatia, Kutubdia, Sitakundu and Feni. 30 people died when Roanu hit the country, most of them died when the cyclone's storm surge overtopped dams. Around 40,000 homesteads and business houses were damaged.

The storm disrupted electricity supply and road communications in the areas. Food storage, seasonal crops were damaged. Livestock, including fish and shrimp firms were swept away. Damage in Chittagong and Cox's Bazar were about ৳250 crore (US$31.8 million).

== Economy ==
Key Economic Indicators for Bangladesh in 2016
National Income
	Current US$	Current BDT	% of GDP
GDP	$221.4 billion	BDT17.3 trillion	
GDP growth (annual %)	7.1%		
GDP per capita	$1,401.6	BDT109,691	
Agriculture, value added	$31.1 billion	BDT2.4 trillion	14.0%
Industry, value added	$60.5 billion	BDT4.7 trillion	27.3%
Services, etc., value added	$118.8 billion	BDT9.3 trillion	53.7%
Balance of Payment
	Current US$	Current BDT	% of GDP
Current account balance	$0.9 billion		.4%
Imports of goods and services	$48.2 billion	BDT3.7 trillion	21.3%
Exports of goods and services	$37,662.7 million	BDT2.9 trillion	16.6%
Foreign direct investment, net inflows	$2,332.7 million		1.1%
Personal remittances, received	$13,574.3 million		6.1%
Total reserves (includes gold) at year end	$32,283.8 million		
Total reserves in months of imports	7.6		

Note: For the year 2016 average official exchange rate for BDT was 78.65 per US$.

== Events ==
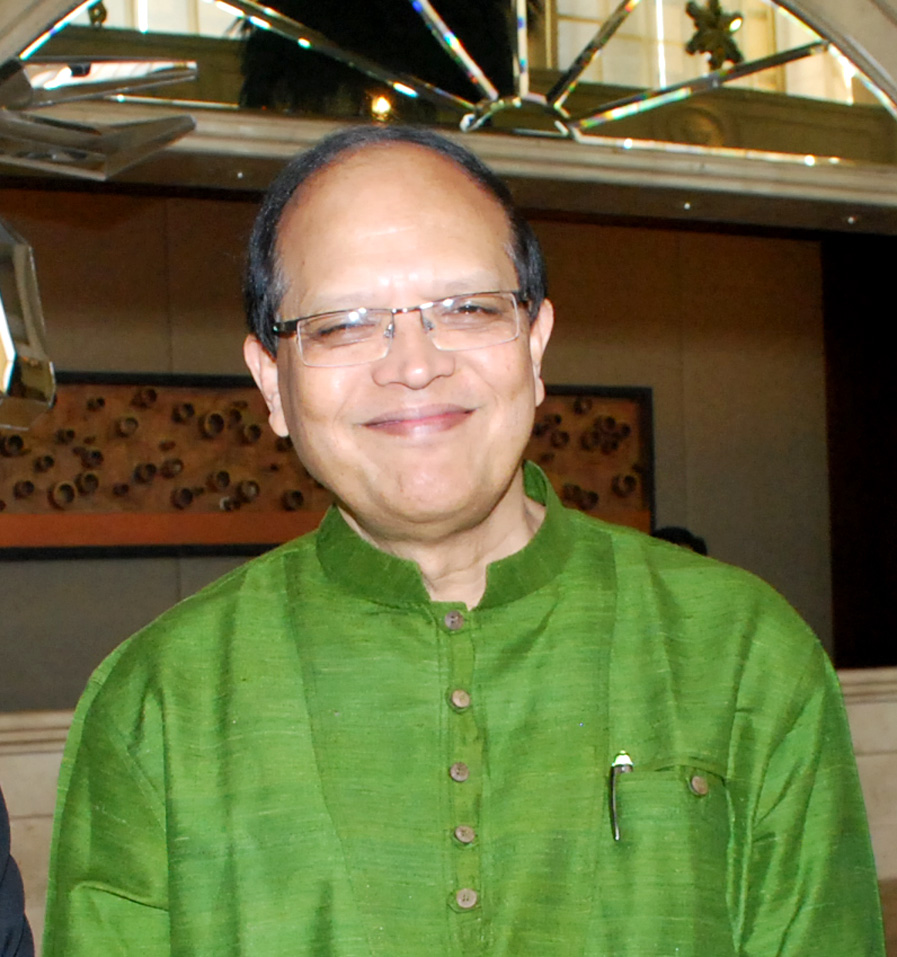
Atiur Rahman, Governor of Bangladesh Bank, resigned in response to Bangladesh Bank cyber heist.

- 4 February - ‍Hackers breached into the Bangladesh Bank's system and managed to transfer $101 million to entities in the Philippines and Sri Lanka from the bank's account with the Federal Reserve Bank of New York.
- 9 March - An Antonov An-26 cargo aircraft, operated by True Aviation, crashed in the Bay of Bengal, five minutes after takeoff from Cox's Bazar Airport,
- 20 March - Murder of Sohagi Jahan Tonu sparks country wide protest.
- 2 April - A protest movement broke out against a Bangladeshi-Chinese consortium's acquisition of agricultural lands, graveyards and homes to build a coal-based power plant in the Banshkhali Upazila of Chittagong. When the owners and engineers of the plant attempted to visit the construction site, protesters swooped down on the officials' motorcade. Police cracked down on the protesters, arresting seven. Angry at the arrests, local residents called for a public gathering on 4 April.
- 4 April - Awami League leaders called a meeting at the same place where Banshkhali power plant movement organizers were gathering. Local police invoked a Section 144 law restricting public gatherings in the area. When local residents gathered to protest, police opened fire and killed at least five people.
- 23 April - A. F. M. Rezaul Karim Siddique, a professor of English at Rajshahi University died in an attack suspected to have been carried out by Islamist militants.
- 25 April - Xulhaz Mannan, an employee of the United States embassy in Dhaka and the founder of Bangladesh's first and only LGBT-themed magazine Roopbaan was killed in his apartment along with another LGBT activist Mahbub Rabbi Tonoy in a machete attack by Islamist extremists.
- 11 May - Former Minister and leader of the Bangladesh Jamaat-e-Islami, Motiur Rahman Nizami executed by hanging at Dhaka Central Jail.
- 1 July - Twenty two civilians, including seventeen foreigners, and two police officers are killed, and 14 taken hostage in a terror attack at the Holey Artisan Bakery in Gulshan Thana in Dhaka. The attack started at about 21:40 local time and the hostage situation lasted overnight.
- 2 July - Members of Bangladesh Army, Navy, Air Force, Border Guards, Police, Combat Police, Rapid Action Battalion, SWAT and joint forces conducted the rescue operation at the Holey Artisan Bakery at 07:40 local time. Thirteen hostages were rescued. Five of the attackers were killed in a gunfight with the commandos, while the sixth was captured alive.
- 27 August - Alleged emir of the Islamic State (IS) in Bangladesh and mastermind of the July 2016 Dhaka attack at the Gulshan café, Tamim Ahmed Chowdhury killed in a raid on an IS safehouse in Dhaka by Bangladeshi forces.
- 3 September - Former director of Islami Bank, and chairman of the Diganta Media Corporation, Mir Quasem Ali hanged at Gazipur after his final appeal was rejected by the Supreme Court of Bangladesh.
- 1 November - Bangladesh recorded their first ever test win against England during a bilateral cricket series.

=== Awards and Recognitions ===
==== Independence Day Award ====
Recipients	Area	Note
Abul Maal Abdul Muhith	Independence and Liberation War	Finance minister of Bangladesh
Emaz Uddin Pramanik	Independence and Liberation War	Textiles and Jute Minister of Bangladesh
Moulavi Asmat Ali Khan	Independence and Liberation War	posthumous
Badrul Alam	Independence and Liberation War	Squadron Leader, Bir Uttam, formed Bangladesh Air Force
Shahid Shah Abdul Mazid	Independence and Liberation War	Prevented the attack on Rajshahi Police Lines by the Pakistan occupation force
M Abdul Ali	Independence and Liberation War	posthumous; Administrator of Rangamati killed by Pakistani military force attack
AKM Abdur Rouf	Independence and Liberation War	posthumous; typographer of the constitution
KM Shehabuddin	Independence and Liberation War	posthumous; first diplomat to resign from Pakistani Foreign Service and pledge allegiance to Bangladesh; first head of Bangladesh's New Delhi mission
Syed Hasan Imam	Independence and Liberation War	cultural activities during the Liberation War
Rafiqul Islam	Mother Language	posthumous
Abdus Salam	Mother Language	Achieving recognition of 21 February as International Mother Language Day
Maqsudul Alam	Science and Technology	Posthumous; decoded the jute genome
Mohammad Rafi Khan	Medical Science	
Rezwana Choudhury Bannya	Cultural	
Nirmalendu Goon	Literature	
Bangladesh Navy		

==== Ekushey Padak ====
Ekushey Padak was awarded to 16 people.

1. Kazi Ebadul Haque, language movement
2. Sayed Haider, language movement
3. Syed Golam Kibria, language movement (posthumous)
4. Jasim Uddin Ahmed, language movement
5. Jahanara Ahmed, arts (television and film)
6. Pandit Amaresh Roy Chowdhury, arts (classical music)
7. Shaheen Samad, arts (music)
8. Amanul Haque, arts (dance)
9. Kazi Anowar Hossain, arts (painting) (posthumous)
10. Mofidul Hoque, Liberation War
11. Toab Khan, journalism
12. ABM Abdullah, research
13. Mongsen Ching Monsin, research
14. Jyoti Prakash Dutta, language and literature
15. Hayat Mamud, language and literature
16. Habibullah Siraji, language and literature

=== Sports ===
- Olympics:
  - Bangladesh competed at the 2016 Summer Olympics in Rio de Janeiro, Brazil, from 5 to 21 August, but did not win any medal in the competition.
- South Asian (Federation) Games:
  - Bangladesh participated in the South Asian Games held in Guwahati and Shillong, India. Bangladesh won 4 golds, 15 silvers and 56 bronzes to finish the tournament at the fifth position in overall points table.
- Football:
  - Bangladesh hosted 2016 Bangabandhu Cup in January. Nepal won the tournament.
  - Dhaka Abahani won Premier League title.
- Cricket:
  - 2016 Asia Cup was held in Bangladesh from 24 February to 6 March. It was the 13th edition of the Asia Cup, the fifth to be held in Bangladesh, and the first to be played using the T20I format. India beat Bangladesh by 8 wickets in the final to win their sixth Asia Cup title.
  - The English cricket team toured Bangladesh in October to play three One Day Internationals (ODIs), two Test matches and three tour matches. England won the ODI series 2–1. The Test series finished 1–1, with Bangladesh recording their first ever Test win against England when they won the second Test by 108 runs.

== Deaths ==
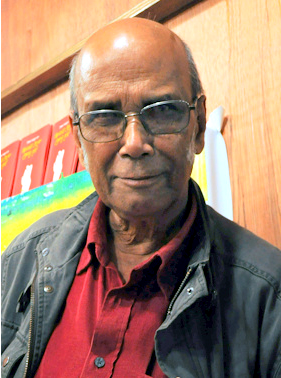
Syed Shamsul Haque (1935–2016)

- 24 February - Abul Kalam Mohammed Zakaria, archaeologist (b. 1918)
- 24 February - A. K. N. Ahmed, economist (b. 1931)
- 10 March - Robin Ghosh, music composer (b. 1939)
- 12 March - Rafiq Azad, poet and a freedom fighter (b. 1942)
- 19 March - Rashiduddin Ahmad, neurosurgeon (b. 1937)
- 20 March - Parveen Sultana Diti, actor (b. 1965)
- 30 March - Mohammad Ferdous Khan, educationist
- 16 May - Sadek Khan, journalist (b. 1933)
- 23 May - Nurjahan Begum, journalist (b, 1925)
- 16 July - M. A. Mannan, neurologist (b. 1932)
- 4 September - M. Abdur Rahim, politician (b. 1927)
- 27 September - Syed Shamsul Haque, poet and writer (b. 1935)

== See also ==
- 2010s in Bangladesh
- List of Bangladeshi films of 2016
- 2015–16 Bangladeshi cricket season
- Timeline of Bangladeshi history
