= Ashraful Alam =

Ashraful Alam may refer to:

- Ashraful Alam (educationist)
- Ashraful Alam (singer)
