= Kumargaon Power Plant =

- Country: Bangladesh
- Coordinates: 24.9102°N 91.82918°E
- Commission date: 1967
- Owner: Bangladesh Power Development Board
- Operator: Bangladesh Power Development Board

Thermal power station
- Primary fuel: Natural gas

Power generation
- Nameplate capacity: 261 MW

Sylhet power plant popularly known as Kumargaon Power Plant (Bengali: কুমারগাঁও বিদ্যুৎকেন্দ্র) also known as Kumargaon Power Station is a gas turbine power station in Sylhet Sadar Upazila, Sylhet District of Bangladesh. This plant is operated by Bangladesh Power Development Board (BPDB). It has connected Sylhet district and some parts of Moulvibazar, Sunamganj, and Habiganj.

== Structure ==
Kumargaon Power Plant is located at Akhalia, Kumargaon. It is a 132/33 KV transmission grid substation with two transmission line. One is 225 MW, while the other is 20 MW.

== History ==
Kumargaon substation was built in 1967 with a capacity of 13 MW. The Ministry of Power, Energy and Mineral Resources of Bangladesh planned to upgrade 150 MW Sylhet Gas turbine power plant to 225 MW Combined cycle power plant to generate more power using less gas. For this purpose, Bangladesh Power Development Board (PDB) has signed a deal with Shanghai Electric Group in 2009. PGCB has four 132/33 KV transformers at Kumargaon substation. Bangladesh Power Development Board also has two 33/11 KV transformers to supply electricity to the city.

== See also ==
- Electricity sector in Bangladesh
- Energy policy of Bangladesh
- List of power stations in Bangladesh
