= Kumargaon =

Coordinates: 24.9125°N 91.8271°E

Kumargaon (Bengali: কুমারগাঁও) is a region situated in Sylhet Sadar Upazila, on the outskirts of Sylhet, Bangladesh. It lies mostly within Tuker Bazar Union, with a small part in Khadimnagar Union. Shahjalal University of Science and Technology is located in this area.

== History ==
On July 8, 2015, Sheikh Mohammad Samiul Alam Rajon, a 13-year-old vegetable seller, was lynched at Kumargaon Bus Stand for allegedly trying to steal a rickshaw van. The vigilantes recorded the killing on video and posted it to social media, creating a national uproar. One of the accused was held while trying to dump the body.
