= Shushama Das =

Bangladeshi folk singer (1930–2025)

- সুষমা দাস
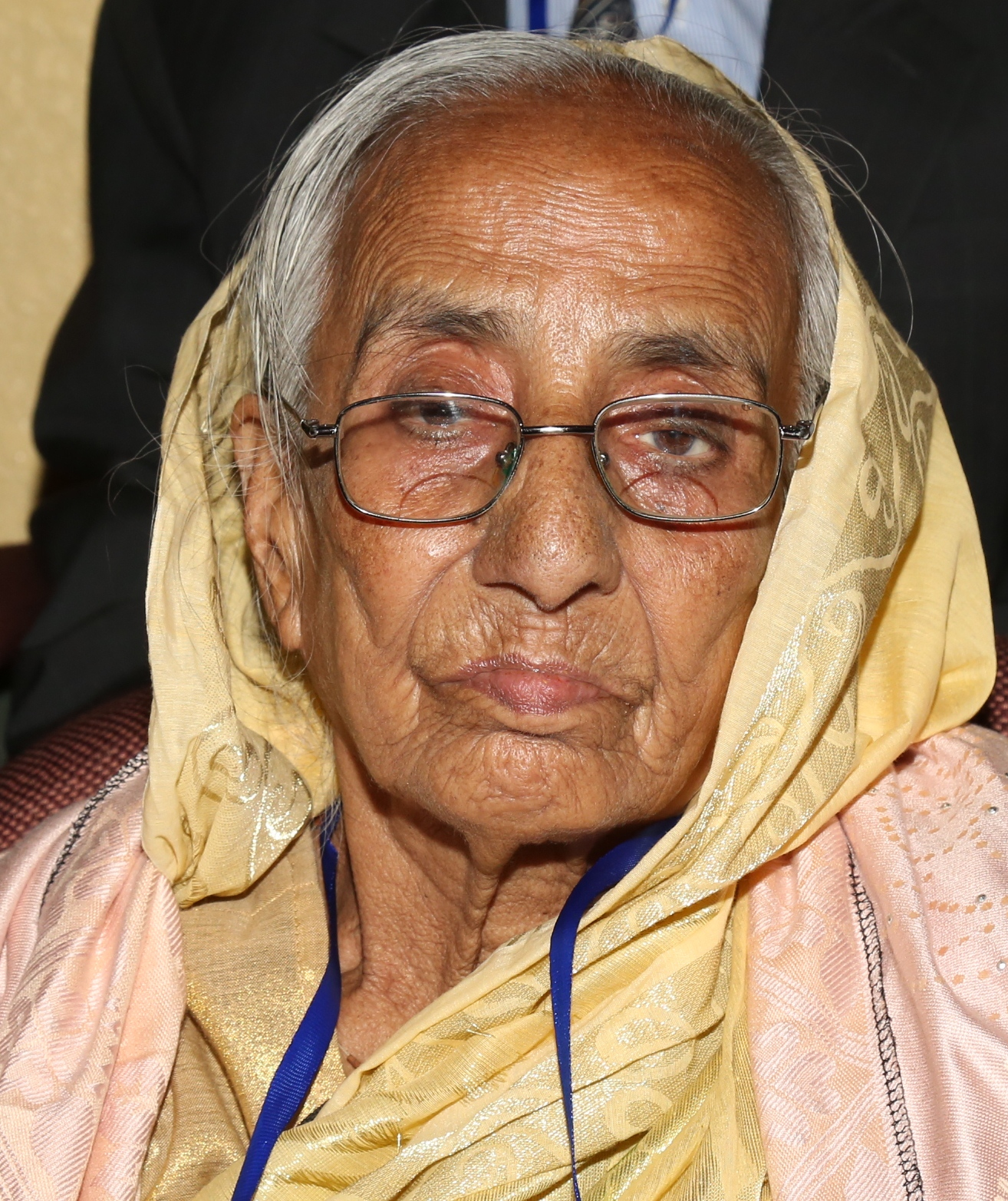
- Shushama in 2017
- Born: 1 May 1930; Putka, Sunamganj district, Assam Province, British India
- Died: 26 March 2025 (aged 94); Sylhet, Bangladesh
- Relatives: Ramkanai Das (brother)

Shushama Das (Bengali: সুষমা দাস; 1 May 1930 – 26 March 2025) was a Bangladeshi folk singer, who was awarded Ekushey Padak by the Government of Bangladesh in 2017.

== Life and career ==
Das was born to Rashiklal Das and Dibyamoyi Das. She was married to Prannath Das in 1946. Her younger brother Ramkanai Das was also an Ekushey Padak-winning musician. Das died on 26 March 2025, at the age of 94.
