= Karunamaya Goswami =

Bangladeshi musicologist and litterateur

Karunamoy Goswami
- করুণাময় গোস্বামী
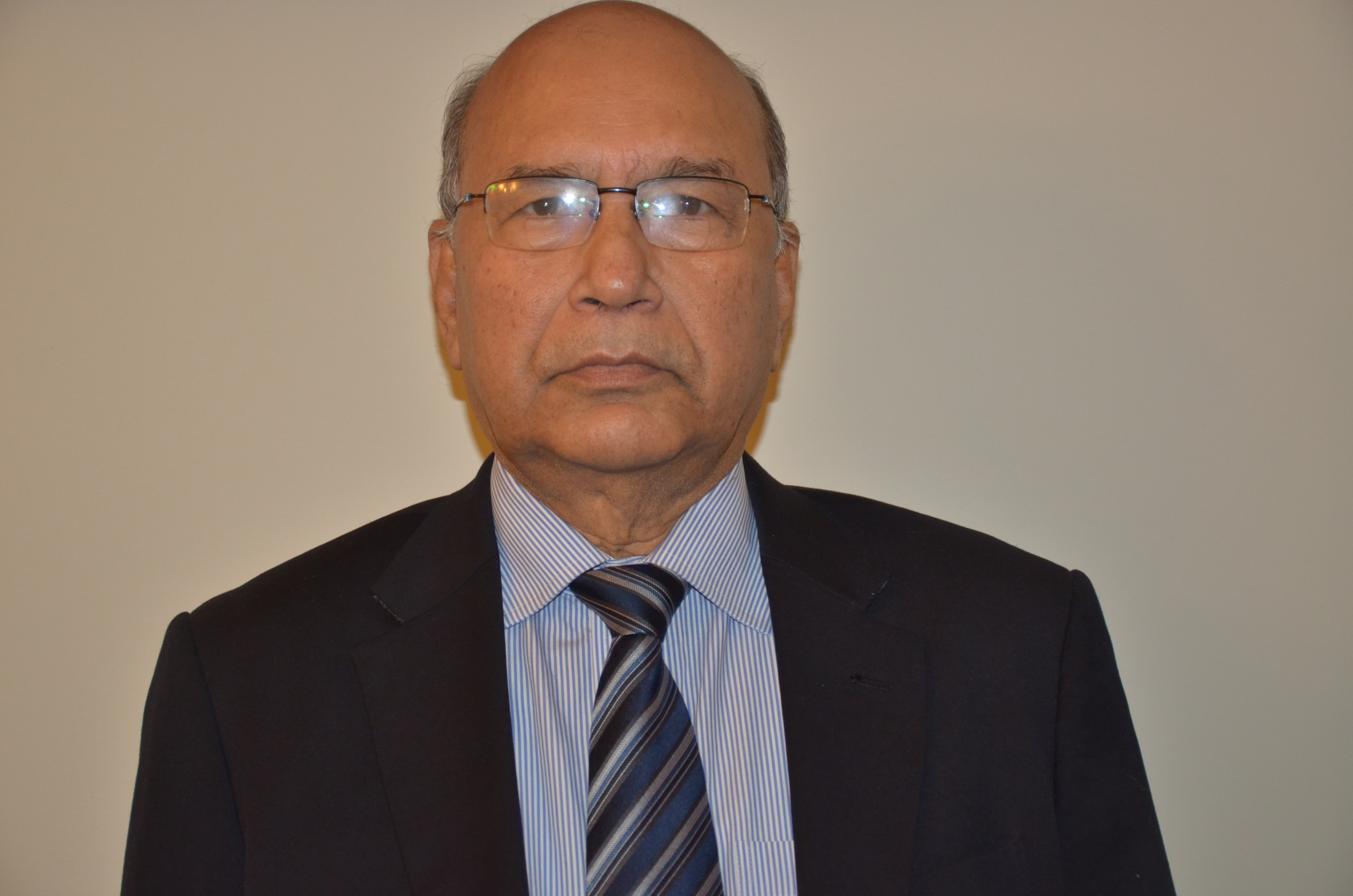
- Karunamaya Goswami in 2016
- Born: 11 March 1943
- Died: 30 June 2017 (aged 74)
- Education: University of Dhaka (Ph.D.)

Karunamaya Goswami (11 March 1943 – 30 June 2017) was a Bangladeshi musicologist and litterateur. He was awarded Ekushey Padak in 2012 by the Government of Bangladesh for his contribution to music research. He is known as a Nazrul Geeti exponent.

== Education ==
Goswami completed his Ph.D. on the topic "Bangla Kavyageetir Dharay Kazi Nazrul Islam-er Sthan, Contribution of Kazi Nazrul Islam to the development of Bengali music" from the University of Dhaka in 1987.

== Works ==
- Aspects of Nazrul Songs (1990)
- Kazi Nazrul Islam: A Profile (1990)
- Introducing Kazi Nazrul Islam (1999)
- Rabindranath-er Palestine Bhabna O Onnanyo (2006)
- Stories of Africa (1975)

== Awards ==
- Nazrul Memorial Gold Medal and Award (1987)
- Bangla Academy Literary Award (2009)
- Ekushey Padak (2012)
- Tagore Award by Bangla Academy (2013)
