= Sinking of ML Mostofa-3 =

2015 crash and capsizing of a ferry in Dhaka, Bangladesh

- Location of Manikganj District in Bangladesh
- Date: 22 February 2015
- Location: Dhaka, Manikganj District, Dhaka Division, Bangladesh
- Deaths: 70
- Arrests: Captain and two crew members of the trawler

On 22 February 2015, a two-deck ferry traveling on the Padma River in the Manikganj District, Dhaka Division in Dhaka, Bangladesh, capsized. Up to 70 people were killed in the crash when it hit a trawler.

== Capsizing ==
Approximately 150 people were on board ML Mostofa-3, which was traveling from Daulatdia to Paturia. The ferry was traveling on the Padma River when it crashed into a trawler, causing it to overturn. The ferry weighed about fifty tons and had a maximum capacity of only 100 to 120 passengers. Despite reports from passengers that there were as many as 250 to 300 passengers on board, the ferry staff denied those claims, stating there were only about 150 to 200 passengers on board. The two vessels did not leave enough space to pass between one another, causing the two ships to crash. As the ferry was capsizing, passengers located on the top deck jumped off the ferry and were able to swim safely to shore. After the capsizing, a salvage vessel with a crane raised the ferry from the water. This allowed the Bangladesh Fire department and Bangladesh Navy to search inside the ferry. Rescuers at the scene were able to save around fifty passengers.

== Aftermath ==
The captain and two crew members of the trawler were arrested. The local government gave 20,000 Bangladeshi taka as a burial fee for fifteen of the victims. The prime minister of Bangladesh, Sheikh Hasina, ordered a full investigation on the capsizing be conducted. The investigation is being conducted by a five-member committee, led by shipping department's nautical surveyor Capt Shahjahan. Offering his condolences, the shipping minister of Bangladesh, Shahjahan Khan, gave 105,000 takas to the victims of the capsizing.
