= SM Solaiman =

Bangladeshi playwright, director, actor, music composer and singer

Sheikh Mohammad Solaiman
- Born: September 29, 1953
- Died: September 22, 2001 (aged 47)
- Awards: Ekushey Padak

Sheikh Mohammad Solaiman (known as SM Solaiman; September 29, 1953 – September 23, 2001) was a Bangladeshi playwright, director, actor, music composer and singer. He was awarded Ekushey Padak in 2014 by the Government of Bangladesh.

== Career ==
Solaiman was the founder of theatre groups like Padatik, Dhaka Padatik and Theatre Art Unit. He was elected twice as the general secretary of the Bangladesh Group Theatre Federation. He created plays like Ingit, Ei Deshe Ei Beshe, Inspector General, Court Martial and Golapjan.

== Personal life ==
Solaiman was married to Rokeya Rafiq Baby. She served as the chief of theater troupe Theatre Art Unit.

== Legacy ==
Theatrewala, a monthly magazine on theatre, organizes an annual festival Rangamaton Solaiman Mela to celebrate Solaiman's works. A documentary on Solaiman's life titled Khyapa was jointly directed by Manirul Ahsan and Abu Sufian. Solaiman's troupe Theatre Art Unit has been awarding young theatre activists with scholarships since 2005.
