= Omar Ali (poet) =

Bangladeshi poet

- ওমর আলী
- Born: 20 October 1939; Komorpur village, Pabna Sadar Upazila, Bengal Presidency, British India
- Died: 3 December 2015 (aged 76); Komorpur village, Pabna Sadar Upazila, Pabna District, Bangladesh
- Education: University of Dhaka; University of Rajshahi
- Occupation: poet

Omar Ali (20 October 1939 – 3 December 2015) was a Bangladeshi poet. He was awarded Ekushey Padak by the Government of Bangladesh in 2017.

== Education and career ==
After completing his studies, Ali stayed at the residence of the poet Ahsan Habib as a login master. Ali joined in The Daily Sangbad. He was later admitted for Bachelor of Arts studies in Pabna Edward College. He had a clerical job in Pabna municipality and Kamarkhanda Upazila. After completing his bachelor's, he joined Rajshahi Radio as a script writer. He joined Jublee High School in Pabna as a lecturer. He completed his master's in English from the University of Dhaka in 1970. The same year, he then joined as an English teacher at Nandigram College in Bogra. He subsequently worked in Veramara College of Kushtia District and Pabna Government Bulbul College. He completed his second master's in Bangla from University of Rajshahi in 1975.

Ali published his first poem in The Daily Sangbad in 1954. His first book "A Desher Shamol Rong Romonir Shunam Shunasi" was published in 1960. The book contained 50 poems and most of them are based on romanticism. He published 42 books of poetry and 2 novels.

== Awards ==
- Bangla Academy Literary Award (1981)
- Abul Monsur Ahmed award
- Ekushey Padak (2017)

== Works ==
- Aronna Akti Lok
- Temathar Shesh Nodi
- Ful Pakhider Desh
- Khan Manshoner Meya
