= Mumtaz Begum (activist) =

- Born: Kalyani Ray Chowdhury; May 20, 1923; Howrah, Kolkata, Bengal Presidency, British India
- Died: June 30, 1967 (aged 44)
- Education: Bethune College; University of Dhaka

Mumtaz Begum (born Kalyani Ray Chowdhury; May 20, 1923 – June 30, 1967) was a Bengali language activist from East Pakistan. She was awarded Ekushey Padak in 2012 by the Government of Bangladesh for her role in language movement.

== Background and education ==
Begum was born to Mohimchandra Ray, a district judge and later a justice of Kolkata High Court and Makhanmoti Devi, a school teacher. She was a niece of litterateur Pramathanath Bishi. In 1944, she was married to Abdul Mannaf, an official of Kolkata Civil Supply Office and a student of law at Kolkata University. She passed the matriculation examination in 1938. Later she completed her bachelor's from Bethune College in 1942 and the BEd examination from University of Dhaka in 1951.

== Career ==
During the Bengali language movement on February 21, 1952, the first procession of women was led by Begum. She was imprisoned from February 1952 until May 1953. She served as the Headmistress of Anandamoyee Girls' High School and Ahmad Bawani Girls High School, Shishu Niketan.
