= Habibur Rahman Milon =

Bangladeshi journalist

- Born: 1935; Brahmanbaria, Bengal Presidency, British India
- Died: 14 June 2015 (aged 80); Dhaka, Bangladesh
- Resting place: Martyred Intellectuals Graveyard, Mirpur
- Occupation: Journalist

Habibur Rahman Milon (1935 – 14 June 2015) was a Bangladeshi journalist. He was awarded the Ekushey Padak award in 2012 by the government of Bangladesh.

== Career ==
Milon served as an advisory editor of The Daily Ittefaq. He also worked for the Daily Sangbad, Dainik Paygam, Dainik Azad, and Dainik Bangla.

== Awards ==
- Jatir Janok Award
- Shaheed Suhrawardi Award
- BFUJ Award
- Barrister A Rasul Gold Medal
- Ekushey Padak (2012)
