= Ramkanai Das =

Bangladeshi musician

Pandit Ramkanai Das
- রামকানাই দাস
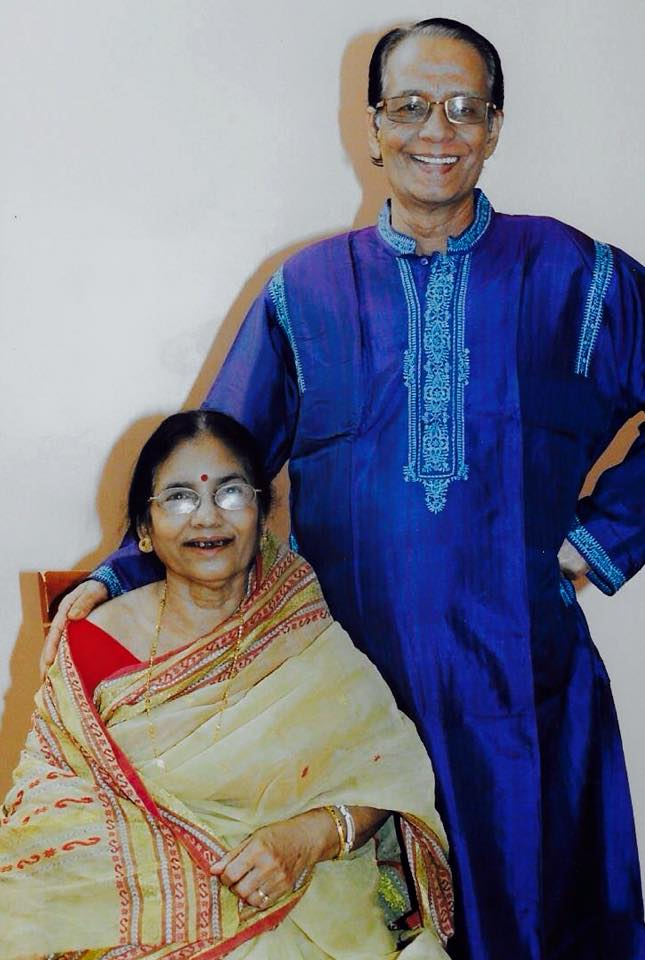
- Das with his wife Subarna Das in New York (2008)
- Pronunciation: [ˈramˌkanai̯ d̪aʃ]
- Born: 1935; Sullah, Sunamganj, Greater Sylhet , Assam Province, British India
- Died: 5 September 2014 (aged 78–79); Dhaka, Bangladesh
- Resting place: Sylhet, Bangladesh
- Occupations: Musician; Singer-songwriter
- Spouse: Subarna Das
- Relatives: Shushama Das (sister)
- Awards: Ekushey Padak (2014)
- Musical career
- Genres: Hindustani classical music; Bengali folk music
- Instruments: Vocals; harmonium; tabla; tanpura
- Years active: 1967–2014

Ramkanai Das (Bengali: রামকানাই দাস; 1935 – 5 September 2014) was a Bangladeshi folk and classical musician. He was awarded Ekushey Padak by the government of Bangladesh in 2014.

== Early life ==
Das was born in Sullah Upazila of Sunamganj District (in present-day Bangladesh) in 1935 to his parents Rashiklal Das and Dibyamoyi Das. They were folk singers, lyricists, and composers. He was one of 6 children with two older sisters and three younger brothers. Das's grandfather, Prakash Chandra Talukdar, and great-grandfather, Ramcharan Talukdar, were all also musicians. He married Subarna Das in 1960.

== Death and legacy ==
Das died on 5 September 2014. He wrote and composed almost one hundred songs including "Shuno Kokilaye Koirache Dhoni," "Manushe Manushe Keno Bibhedh Hoye," and "Shuno Bokule Boshiya Gahe." He has also composed popular songs such as "sadher lao banailo more" and "Ore Mon Dorachar."

Das inspired his wife, Subarna Das, to start composing songs. His elder sister, Shushama Das, started gaining more popularity as a folk artist. His only daughter, Kaberi Das, is a singer and president of Sangeet Parishad, New York. Her two daughters, Paromita, and Shrutikona are also renowned musicians in America. Pandit Ramkanai Das's elder son, Arun Chandra Das, is a musical instrument businessman and his younger son, Pinusen Das, is a tabla artiste. Pinusen's wife, Anindita Chowdhury, is a Nazrul Sangeet artiste in Bangladesh.
