= Bahaddarhat =

Coordinates: 22.368589°N 91.843965°E

Bahaddarhat (Bengali: বহদ্দারহাট) is a suburb of Chittagong in southeastern Bangladesh. Bahaddarhat was the site of the 2012 Bahaddarhat Flyover collapse, in which steel girders supporting an under-construction overpass collapsed, claiming at least 13 lives.

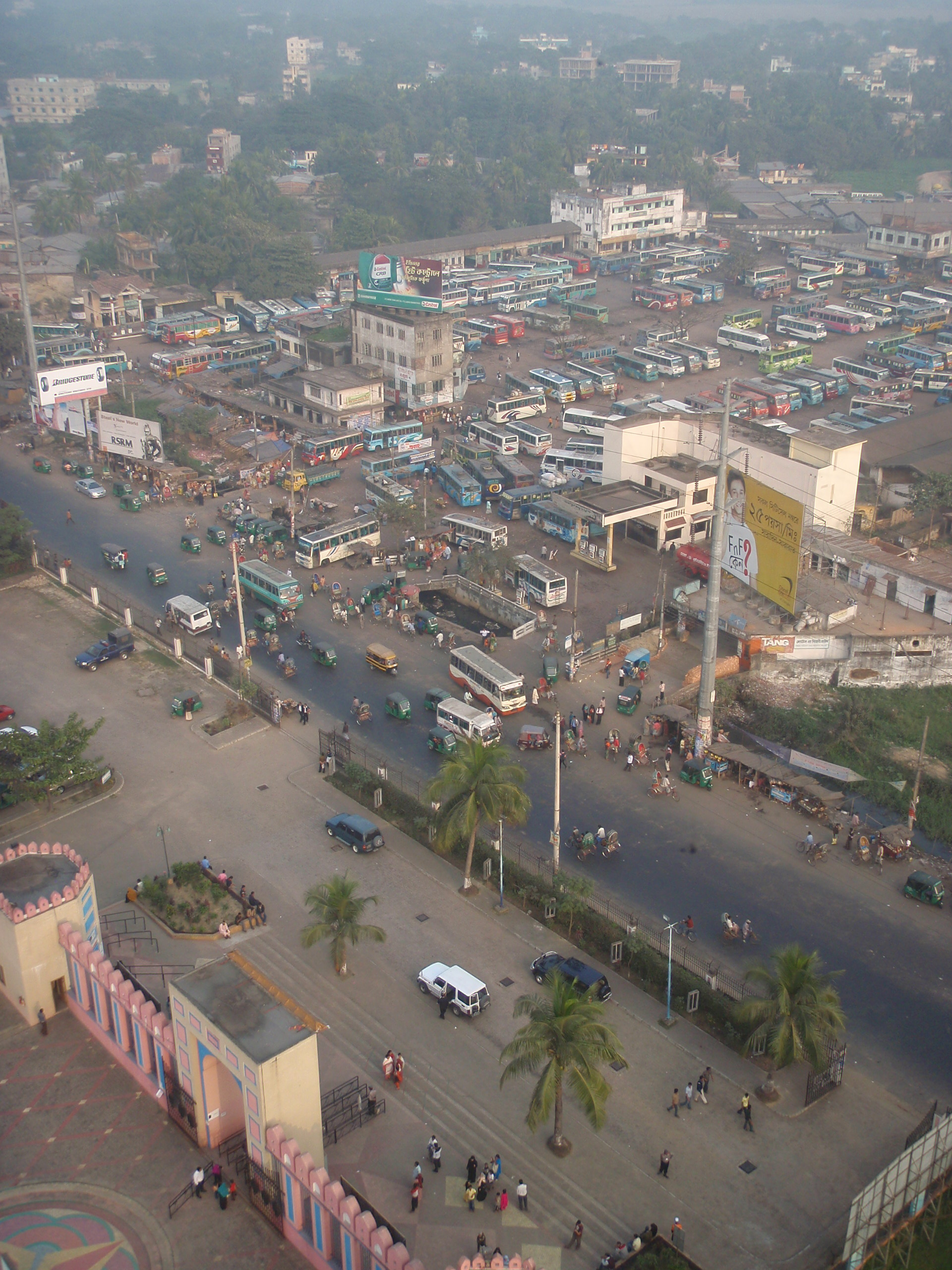
Bahaddarhat Bus Terminal
