= Bahaddarhat Flyover collapse =

Coordinates: 22.36835°N 91.84398°E

The Bahaddarhat Flyover collapse occurred on 24 November 2012 when steel girders at the under-construction flyover collapsed in the suburb of Bahaddarhat in Chittagong, Bangladesh, killing seventeen people. The government of Bangladesh announced that sixteen people died at the scene and over fifty people were injured when the collapse occurred at 7:30 pm local time (GMT +6).

== Event ==
Three girders from the flyover collapsed about 20 metres (66 ft) from the Big City Clock in the centre of Bahaddarhat.

At 7:30:00 pm on 24 Nov 2012, the girders collapsed with a loud boom. Bystanders came to help the victims.

It was estimated that about 500 people were staying beneath these girders. Moreover, there were many customers in the nearby floating market.

Students dwelling around the Bahaddarhat area usually liked to gossip with their friends in front of "Bahaddar Bari Pukur Par" in the evening after finishing their tutorial classes in coaching. There was a place to sit where students found it more comfortable which was under those girders. In the evening of the incident people saw many students gossiping in that place.

This was not the first incident of girders failing, as there was a previous incident the same year. On 29 June 2012, a girder of the same flyover fell, with no major damage or harm done to the public. Both incidents were believed to have happened due to lax security measures around the construction site.

== Aftermath ==
When the incident took place, people rushed to help those stuck in the rubble and the Fire brigade arrived within an hour. People started screaming in Bahaddar Bari as many of those killed were from the area.

Protests ensued shortly after the event. Protestors set fire to vehicles and a makeshift office of the construction company that was nearby, as well as its equipment. People attacked a fire engine after it had arrived, claiming that it had arrived late. There were so many protestors that the firefighters had to enlist the help of the military to reach the site of collapse.

The incident killed 13 people and over 50 people were injured.

A police report was filed by a sub-inspector only 2 days after the incident occurred.

As of 10 July 2024, the 8 persons help responsible for the collapse have been charged and sentenced to prison. The people that were charged included the project manager of Mir Akhter & Parisha Trade Systems, the contractor and the 6 engineers responsible for the construction of the flyover.

The names of the people held responsible are Giyas Uddin (project manager at the time), Manjurul Islam, Abdul Jalil, Aminur Rahman, Abdul Hai, Md Mosharraf Hossain Riaz, Shahjan Ali, and Rafiqul Islam. Each were sentenced to 7 years of imprisonment, as well as given a fine that must be paid, or another 6 months would be added to the sentence.

== Reasons Behind Incident ==
The lax security measures and negligence around the construction site were not the only reason for the collapse of the flyover. There were other reasons that had a play into the severity of the incident.

One of the biggest reasons is the structural issues with the girders that fell. The girders themselves were not supported correctly when first being put into place. This caused them to tilt and eventually fall over, which led to the incident. There were also problems with more of the construction, involving reinforcements with rebar. Some bars were shaved off, some were aligned wrong, and some were not into the right pattern that was set as a standard. Since the construction of flyovers were new to this country, calculations and design were not sufficient. These problems would also have eventually caused a similar incident, or even more severe.

The negligence itself behind the construction is what led to the biggest repercussions. The fact of there being a market in the middle of an ongoing construction site, the non-standard support of the girders, and the lax security measures when it came to securing the area all compounded into the severity of this incident.
