= Quazi Zakir Hasan =

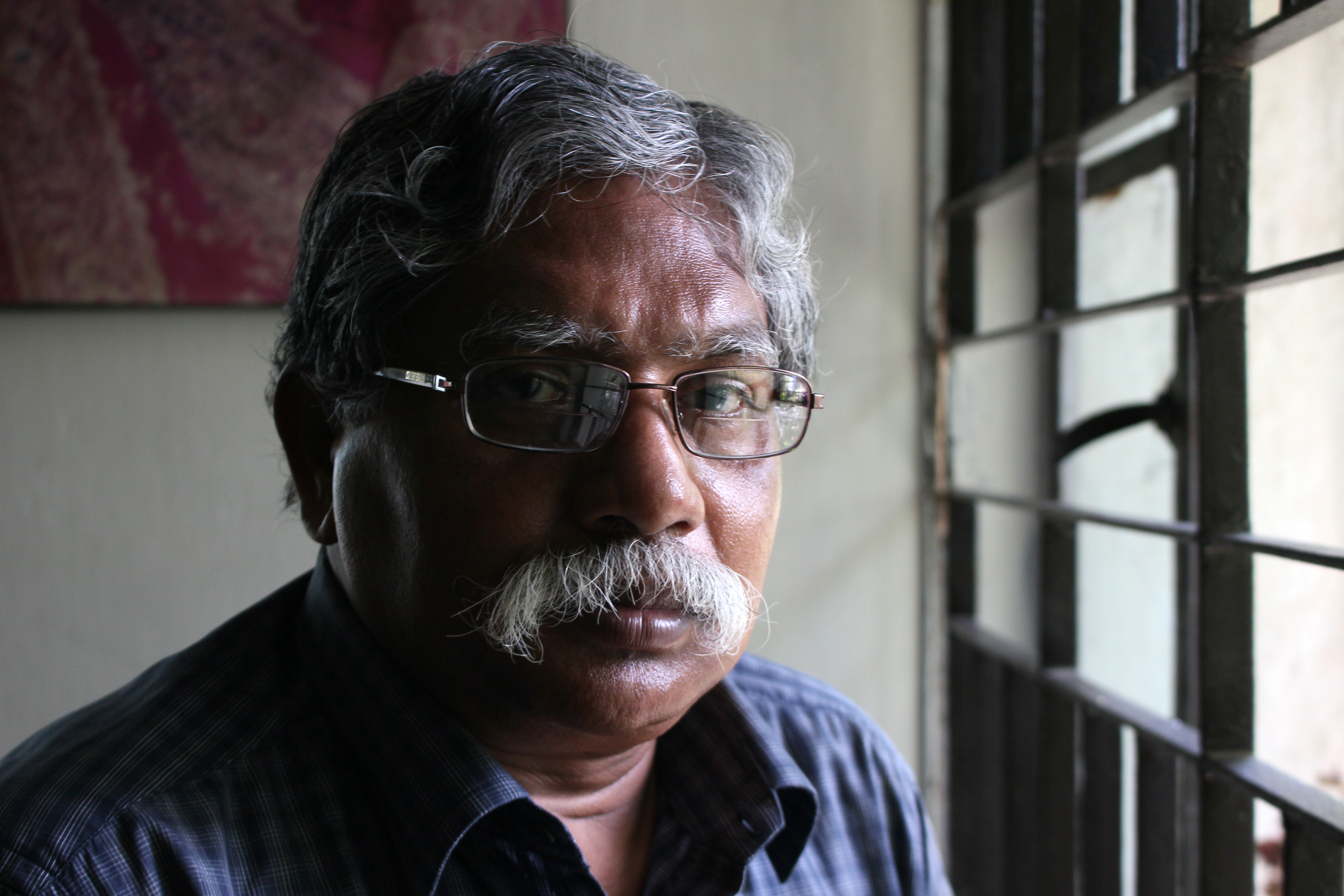

Quazi Zakir Hasan is a Bangladeshi playwright and veteran of the Bangladesh Liberation War. He was awarded the Independence Award, the highest civilian award in Bangladesh.

== Career ==
Hasan completed his SSC certification at the Kurigram River View High School. He joined the Abudharr Ghifari College after moving to Dhaka. While a freshman at the college, Bangladesh Liberation War broke out in 1971. He joined the Mukti Bahini and received initial training in Bhurungamari Government College. He received military training from Indian Army officers at Mujib Camp in Darjeeling.

Hasan fought in Lalmonirhat District of sector 7 of the war zone. His camp was located in India and his unit was commanded by an Indian Army Officer. He also practiced Reiki during the war. He was wounded during the war and received treatment at M.J.N. Medical College & Hospital in Cooch Behar. He was fitted with a prosthetic right leg at Military Hospital Kirkee in Pune.

After the Independence of Bangladesh, he started working as a script writer for Bangladesh Betar. His first radio drama, Kheaghater Majhi, aired in 1972.

In 2018, Hasan was given the Independence Award posthumously for his contribution to the Bangladesh Liberation War.
