= A. K. Nazmul Karim =

Bangladeshi sociologist

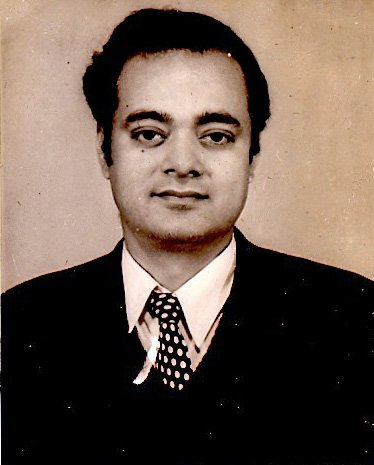
- Born: 1 August 1922; Comilla District, East Bengal, British India
- Died: 18 November 1982 (aged 60)
- Other name: Ibn Rashid
- Education: University of Dhaka; Columbia University; London School of Economics
- Spouse: Syeda Jahanara Begum
- Children: 3
- Parents: Abu Rashid Nizamuddin Mahmood; Mossammat Shamsun Neda Khatun
- Awards: Ekushey Padak (2012)

Abul Khair Nazmul Karim (1 August 1922 – 18 November 1982) was a Bangladeshi sociologist and academic. He was posthumously awarded Ekushey Padak for his contribution to education by the government of Bangladesh in 2012.

== Personal life ==
Karim was born in the Noakhali/Comilla area, now known as Lakshmipur. His parental residence was at Falgoonkora village in the Comilla District. He was the seventh of eight children of Abu Rashid Nizamuddin Mahmood Ahmed and Mossammat Shamsun Neda Khatun. He came from an educated family of school inspectors, private tutors, diwans, and magistrates. His mother came from a zamindari family.

Karim was married to Syeda Jahanara Begum, former principal of Begum Badrunnesa Government Girls' College. They had three daughters - Yasmin Hagen, Nasreen Karim and Lamia Karim. Lamia became a professor and the head of the Department of Anthropology at the University of Oregon.

Karim died on 18 November 1982 from complications brought on by diabetes.

== Education ==
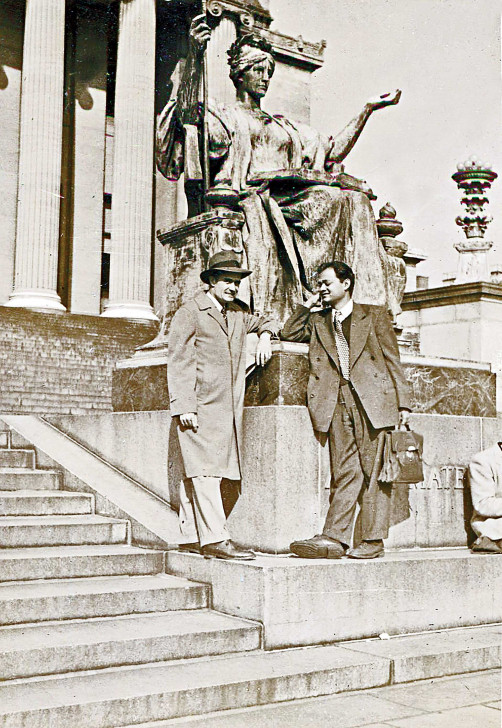
Karim (right) at Columbia University (1950s)

Karim passed his Entrance examination in 1939 in First Division from Thakurgaon High, English School. Later in 1941, he passed IA (Intermediate in Arts) Examination again in First Division from Dhaka College.

Karim graduated from University of Dhaka in 1944 with a B.A. (Hons), and an M.A. in 1946 with distinction in political science. He won the East Pakistan State Scholarship, which enabled him to go to the United States for higher studies. He studied simultaneously "Government" and "Sociology", and earned a master's degree separately in both disciplines from Columbia University in 1953. He studied under Herbert Marcuse, Seymour Lipset, Ajit Kumar Sen, Robert Morrison MacIver, C. Wright Mills, Debendro Nath Banerjee, Morris Ginsberg, Raymond Firth and others. He believed in the Aristotelian philosophy that a teacher should always be available, so his students were welcomed in his office, as well as, in his home. For his scholarly performance, he won a Rockefeller Scholarship to go to the London School of Economics & Political Science, where he was awarded a doctoral degree in sociology under the supervision of Professor T. B. Bottomore in 1964. His thesis' title was, "The Modern Muslim Political Elite in Bengal" which was later published in extended version under the title, "The Dynamics of Bangladesh Society" by Vikas Publishing House Private Ltd. in 1980.

== Career ==
Karim's earliest teaching experience was as a lecturer at Feni College and Dhaka College. Later, he became professor of both the Political Science and Sociology Departments at Dhaka University. He was the founder and chairman of the Sociology Department at University of Dhaka. He authored articles, books, and short stories, sometimes under the pen name of Ibn Rashid. Throughout his life he encouraged learning, patronized the arts and the anthropological study of Bengal and belonged to many civic, cultural, and anthropological societies.

== Legacy ==
Karim was nominated for the Ramon Magsaysay Award in 1983. The Nazmul Karim Study Centre at the University of Dhaka is named after him. In February 2012, he was posthumously awarded Ekushey Padak. His family has set up two scholarship funds at Dhaka University. Since 1983, Dr. Nazmul Karim Memorial Gold Medal has been awarded to the student who stood First Class, First, in M.A. in sociology. From 2014, two scholarships were set up in his wife's name, Principal, Mrs. Syeda Jahanara Karim Scholarships for disadvantaged female students, one in economics and one in anthropology, at the University of Dhaka.

== Publications ==
- "Falgoonkora," Sesame Book Corner, Dhaka, August 1958
- Samajbigyan Samikkhon, Nawroze Kitabistan, Dhaka, 1973
- Changing Society in India & Pakistan, Oxford University Press, Dhaka, 1956
- The Dynamics of Bangladesh Society, Vikas Publishing House Private Ltd., New Delhi, 1980
- Social Life of the Tiparas, The Pakistan Observer, 14 August 1949
- Pakistan and the Islamic State, The Muslim World, October, 1953
- New Nationalism in Pakistan, The Islamic Review, London, 1955
- Political Ideas Behind Pakistan, The New Values, Dhaka, January, 1955
- Social and Economic Background of Islam, The New Values, Dhaka, March, 1955
- The Concept of Islamic Community and Modern Theories of Nationality, The Islamic Review, August, 1955
- Some Aspects of Popular Beliefs among Muslims of Bengal, Eastern Anthropologist, Vol: IX, No. 1 (Lucknow, September–November, 1955)
- Pakistan: An Outcome of Historical Process, The Republic, December, 1957
- Museums and the Preservation of our Dying Cultures, The Republic, Vol: 2, No. 3, August, 1959
- Crime in East Pakistan since 1947, International Review of Criminal Policy, No. 16, October, 1960, New York (in co-operation with Mr. Md. Badrud Doza)
- The Methodology for a Sociology of East Pakistan, Social Research in East Pakistan, Pierre Bessaignet (ed.), The Asiatic Society of Pakistan, Dhaka, 1960
- The Aim of Development, Sociology in East Pakistan, John E. Owen (ed.), The Asiatic Society of Pakistan, Dhaka, 1962
- Social Stratification Patterns among the Muslims of Certain Districts of East Pakistan, Sociology in East Pakistan, John E. Owen (ed.), The Asiatic Society of Pakistan, Dhaka, 1962
- Changing Patterns of a East Pakistan Family, Women in the New Asia, Barbara Ward (ed.), UNESCO, 1965 (in co-operation with Mr. Md. Badrud Doza)
- Political Elite and Agrarian Radicalism in East Pakistan, Holiday Forum, Dhaka, 12 September 1965
- Growth and Nature of Urban Agglomeration in Pakistan, Civilizations, Brussels, 1967 (in co-operation with Mr. Md. Badrud Doza)
- The Concept of Crime, The Morning News, Dhaka, 19 January 1968 (in co-operation with Mr. Md. Badrud Doza)
- Social Science in Bangladesh, Symposium on Social Science Research Development in Asia. Jakarta, Indonesia. 18–22 February 1974 sponsored and published by UNESCO
- Max Weber's Theory of Prebendalization and Bangladesh Society, Bangladesh Journal of Sociology, edited by Professor Md. Afsaruddin, Vol: I, No. 1, 1983 (posthumous publication)
