= Mubinul Azim =

Bangladeshi painter

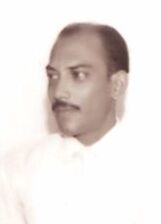
- Azim in 1968
- Born: 24 November 1934
- Died: 1 November 1975
- Movement: Bengali language movement
- Awards: Ekushey Padak

Mubinul Azim (1934-1975) was a Bangladeshi painter who is considered a pioneer in the fine arts scene. He is one of the foremost artists from Bangladesh and a student of Zainul Abedin. He naturally drew inspiration from his own surroundings. His first duo show was held in 1961 followed by 17 solo exhibitions and 37 group exhibitions in Pakistan, Bangladesh and different countries of the world. Out of his 54 painting exhibitions, only 14 took place in Bangladesh. He received awards at the Annual Exhibition of Paintings by Karachi Artists, Arts Council, Karachi, Pakistan in 1963, 1964 and 1967.

Mubinul Azim died at Dhaka, when he was at the peak of his artistic career. After his death, two exhibitions of his works were held at Dhaka Club (1976) and Bangladesh Shilpakala Academy (1998). The Bangladesh Government holding a world class painting of a renowned Artist as symbol of honor at Sonali Bank Branch in London, UK and one of his masterpiece in the Bangladesh National Museum. On 20 February 2012, Mubinul Azim was posthumously awarded the most honorable National Award (Ekushey Padak) by the government of Bangladesh for his contribution in the field of fine arts and his involvement through his paintings during the Language Movement in 1952.

== Early life and education ==
Mubinul Azim was born on 24 November 1934 at Bikrampur. He graduated in fine arts from Bangladesh College of Arts & Crafts (at present Faculty of Fine Arts, Dhaka University) in 1955. Mubinul Azim who became an artist much against the will of his parents, once spent some months in a sweepers colony to absorb the atmosphere of the place before painting it. Unlike many other artists in the city he has chosen to avoid the corruption of commercial art by not joining any of the advertising firms and instead choosing to teach art. Mubinul Azim was trying to establish an individual style of painting. He was an artist with multiple techniques. He not only used the brush and the palette knife to paint but also his finger. He was a total experimenter. He not only loved to employ different techniques but also a variety of materials on his canvases, including sand, cement, cloth, nylon net and jute. In some exhibitions he had tried to use jute canvases in place of cloth canvases for a few of his paintings. He daubs paint with a piece of cloth and in his remarkably successful white "Cobweb" he had tried yet another technique which was supposed to be a secret.

== Language Movement ==
In 1952, Mubinul Azim was involved in the Bengali language movement of East Pakistan. At that time, he was a second-year student at the Dhaka Art College (at present Faculty of Fine arts, University of Dhaka). Probably, Bangladeshi are the only nation in the world, who fought to protect their mother language. The exact number of death in the Language Movement and especially on the day of 21 February 1952, has never been recovered. The bodies of those killed were not given to their families. At midnight, soldiers of the Pakistan Army seized some bodies from the Morgue at Dhaka Medical College. The bodies left at the morgue were not counted then and this also included the injured people who died at the hospital later. Mubinul Azim had organized a few meetings in protest of the firing on the rally on 21 February 1952. He produced many posters and paintings on the Language Movement during that period.

== Career ==
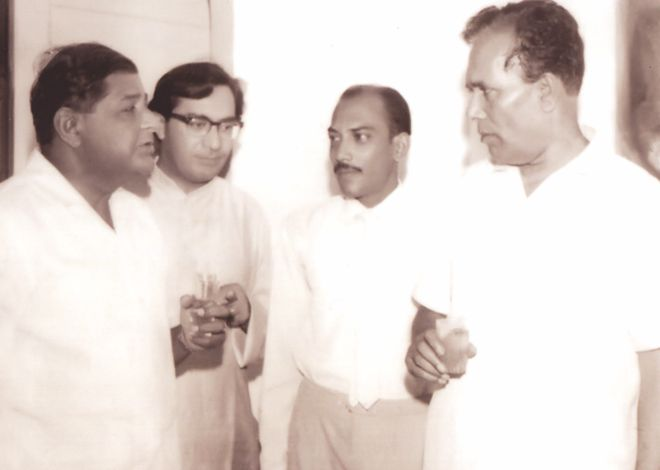
Mubinul Azim (2nd from right) at his exhibition in Karachi (1968)

Mubinul Azim worked as a teacher at the Alliance Francaise Karachi, Pakistan. He was also a lecturer at the Pak-American Centre, Karachi, Pakistan and Teacher's Training College, Dhaka, Bangladesh. From the early '50s to the '60s, Mubinul Azim and a few other painters introduced many forms of modern, abstract, abstract-impressionist, and abstract-expressionist art. Their works had an enriching influence on other emerging painters as well. Mubinul Azim set out as a naturist and figurative painter. In the early stages of his career, nature was the focus of his work. Along with natural elements, color was a predominant aspect of his work. The treatment of color and the composition was exceptional. An interaction between use of space and objects always carried an aesthetic trademark in his works. Still, his paintings, with their unique lucid qualities, have lost none of their appeal. His canvases are marked with pigment and fluidity. He always used a limited number of elements in his canvas. Sometimes, his work seemed to convey the feeling of solitude. During a certain phase of his career, he focused on boats. He drew forms of boats that resembled the impression of a new moon or crescent. He strived to maintain a good balance between color and forms. The interplay of darkness and light was another significant characteristic of his work. He continued his quest for novel and fresh elements in his paintings. He took to using oil paints in a style reminiscent of action painting—quite akin to the works of Jackson Pollock. Mubinul Azim was brilliant in designs and texture. His compositions assumed an expressionistic look as red, blue, and other bold colors began dominating his canvas. He produced many paintings, watercolors, and sketches in the course of his short career span.

== Paintings ==
Mubinul Azim was a prominent figure in the art scene of Pakistan all through the 60s. He moved to Karachi in 1957. His works were exhibited widely. Out of a careful mosaic of detail, environmental and psychological, Mubinul Azim constructed an artistic impression of modern life. He had a passion for detail, naturalistic detail that is selective and expressive of a conscious programme. His art is an affair of impression, built up mentally through observation. His boats, burnt-out landscape, jazz musicians, and city buildings are an endless procession of impressions. He registered the elegance and squalor, the glamour and disenchantment, and the charm and the longings of city life and country life with an impartial brush. He loved to be in the natural setting full of delicate perception and conceived in terms of the individual's surroundings. His compositions are often made on the diagonal, with a horizon line, thus creating a more shallow space in which decorative elements of design, the play of color, and flat shapes and flat color masses can be expressed in more striking patterns. He used color in subtle touches as a kind of compositional counterpoint to the play of line and arabesques of movement. Mubinul Azim taught at an art institute in Karachi and Dhaka (1956-1971). However, he always kept in touch with his contemporaries in Dhaka. Mubinul Azim returned to Dhaka in 1973 after the Liberation War.

== Personal life and death ==
Mubinul Azim was married to Momtaz Azim. Their two daughters are Humaira Azim and Sumaira Azim. Mubinul Azim died on 1 November 1975 in Dhaka. He was buried at Banani Graveyard, Dhaka. Mrs. Momtaz Azim has preserved and documented the collections of the book Mubinul Azim - Colours and Dreams (2015). This book is a collection of reports, articles, and discussions on Mubinul Azim and his works. This collection was published by Bengal Publications as a tribute to Mubinul Azim.
