= AKM Samsul Haque Khan =

Civil servant killed in the Bangladesh Liberation war

AKM Samsul Haque Khan was a Bengali-Pakistani civil servant who was killed in the Bangladesh Liberation War and is considered a martyr in Bangladesh. He was awarded the Independence Day Award, the highest civilian award in Bangladesh, in 2010.

== Early life ==
Khan was born in Tangail. He participated in the 1952 Bengali Language movement while studying at Dhaka College.

== Career ==
Khan was the deputy election commissioner of the 1970 Pakistani general election in Chittagong.

Khan became the Deputy Commissioner of Comilla District in March 1971. He ordered the stoppage of fuel and rations to the Comilla Cantonment in early March, before the start of Bangladesh Liberation war. He also ordered the Superintendent of Police in Comilla District, Munshi Kabir Uddin, to stop cooperating with the Pakistan Army. He also refused to discuss the issues with the martial law administration.

== Death and legacy ==
On 24 March 1971, hours before the start of Operation Searchlight on 25 March, he was detained along with Munshi Kabir Uddin. He was never seen again. He was detained by Major Agha. According to Anthony Mascarenhas both of them were executed by Pakistan Army.

Khan was awarded the Independence Day Award in 2010 for his contribution to the Bangladesh Liberation war posthumously. A road in Comilla has been named after Shaheed Samsul Haq Khan. Besides that the lecture hall of BIAM Auditorium has also been named after him. Shaheed Shamsul Haque Pilot Girls High School was named after him.

After the Independence of Bangladesh, President Sheikh Mujibur Rahman granted a residence to the family members of Khan in Bangshal, Dhaka. In September 2019, his brother was evicted from that house by two people, Miraj Mohammad Jakir Uddin and Sheikh Mohammad Jabed Uddin. On 22 December 2019, Bangladesh Anti Corruption Commission sued them. The main accused secured bail from court in January 2020. The Deputy Commissioner of Wari, Ibrahim Khan, was suspended by Dhaka Metropolitan Police for supporting the land grabbers.
