= Mohammad Mosharraf Hossain (doctor) =

Bangladeshi doctor

Mohammad Mosharraf Hossain was a Bangladeshi doctor who participated in the Liberation of Mirpur during the Bangladesh Liberation War. He was awarded the Independence Award, the highest civilian award in Bangladesh, in 2013 for contributing to the Bangladesh Liberation War.
