= Mohammad Haris Ali =

Bangladeshi physician

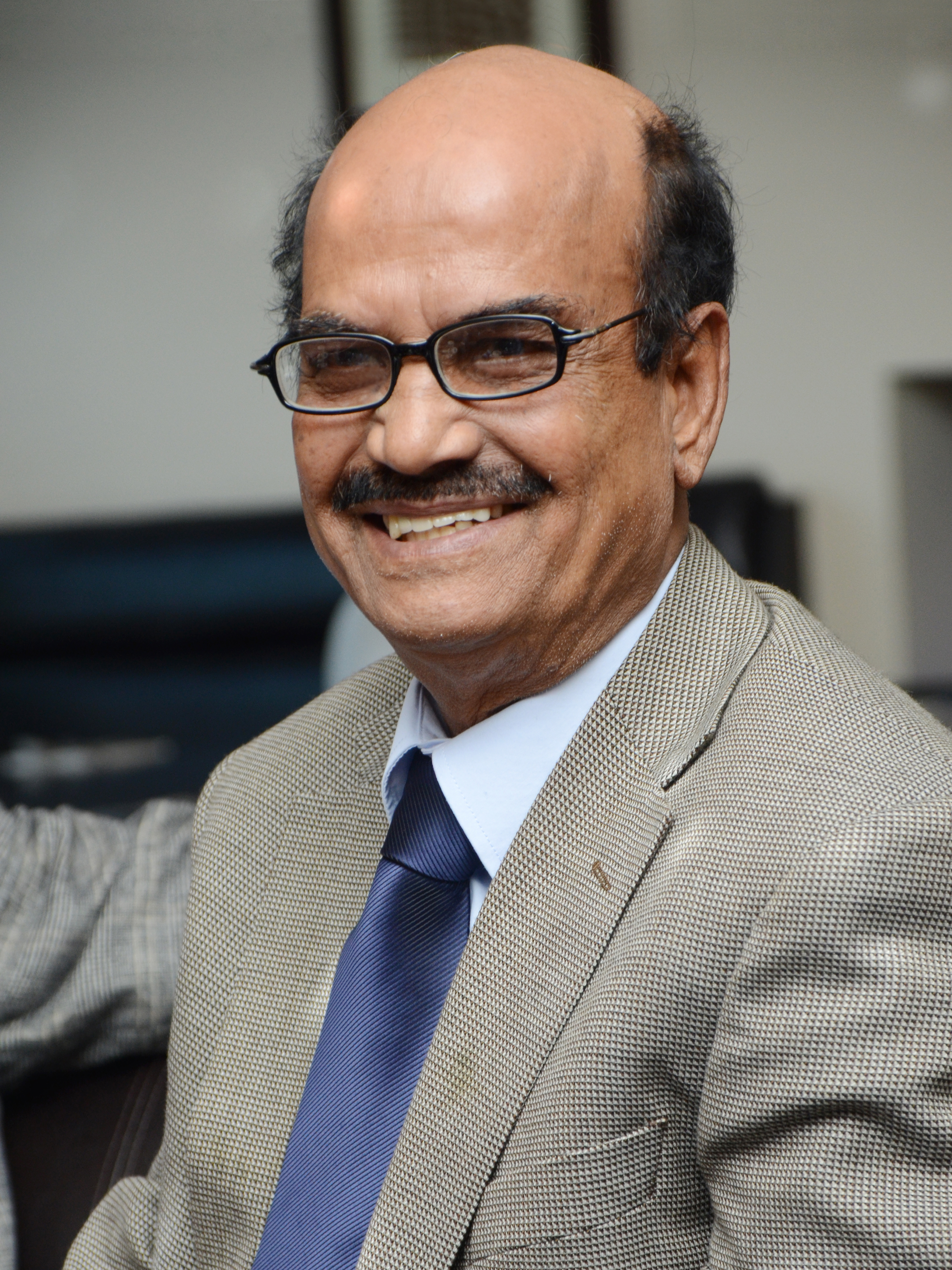
Muhammod Haris Ali in 2013

Mohammad Haris Ali was a Bangladeshi doctor who had served in the Bangladesh Liberation War. He was awarded the Independence Award, the highest civilian award in Bangladesh, posthumously.

During the Bangladesh Liberation War, Ali was the District Sub-Sector Regimental Medical Officer in Sector-5.
