= Shah Abdul Mazid =

Pakistan Police

Shah Abdul Mazid was the superintendent of Pakistan Police in Rajshahi District who was killed in an attack on the Rajshahi police line by the Pakistan Army in 1971. In 2016, he was posthumously awarded the Independence Day Award, the highest civilian award in Bangladesh.

== Career ==
Mazid joined as the Rajshahi District superintendent of police on 15 August 1970.

Mazid and Deputy Inspector General of Police Mamun Mahmud had received information that Rajarbagh Police Lines, main headquarters of police in East Pakistan, had been attacked by Pakistan Army. They had refused to handover the police armory weapons to the Army. Mahmud was called to the Rajshahi Cantonment and he was never seen again along with his driver and bodyguard. The police force in Rajshahi was ordered to surrender to the Pakistan Army but refused and demanded Mahmud be returned. The 25th Punjabis attacked the Rajshahi Police lines. The army stormed the camp and detained Mazid on 31 March 1971. More than 50 police officers were killed in the actions of the Pakistan Army. He has not been since then.

There is a memorial plaque for Mazid at the office of the Rajshahi District superintendent of police inaugurated in 2018 by Javed Patwary, Inspector General of Police. His daughter is Farzana Shahanaj Mazid.
