= Murder of Sheikh Mohammad Samiul Alam Rajon =

2015 child murder in Sylhet, Bangladesh

Sheikh Mohammad Samiul Alam Rajon was a 13-year-old boy who was lynched and killed by four men on July 8, 2015, in Sylhet, Bangladesh. The four men who killed Rajon accused him of stealing a bike shortly before lashing, torturing, and beating him to death. According to local police, Rajon died due to internal bleeding. Among the suspected killers of Rajon was Kamrul Islam, an individual originally deported from Saudi Arabia. Islam fled back to Saudi Arabia immediately after the killing. A three-member Bangladeshi police team in coordination with INTERPOL worked to capture Islam in Saudi Arabia. Others involved in the incident include Nur Ahmed, who filmed the killing on social media.

== Trial and public reaction ==
On September 22, 2015, the Court of Sylhet charged thirteen individuals with various counts of murder, assistance in murder, and other felony charges. They included the prime defendant, Kamrul Islam, as well as Firoz Mia, Shamim Alam, Quamrul Islam, Muhit Alam, Ali Haider, Moyna Mia, Nur Ahmed, Dulal Ahmed, Ayaz Ali, Taz Uddin Badal, Asmat Ali, Pavel Islam, and Ruhul Amin.

A 28-minute video of Rajon's murder was posted on social media, immediately sparking outrage in the local community. In the aftermath of the murder, a public outcry occurred within Bangladesh, especially in Sylhet. The "Justice for Rajon" movement was founded, which demanded swift justice for Rajon's killers. Petitions were formed to raise funds for Rajon's family; some of the petitions received more than 11,000 signatures. Public pressure in conjunction with a string of child murders resulted in a swift conviction of Rajon's four murderers. The verdict of Rajon's case was announced after four months and the attackers were sentenced to be executed.

Judge Shahedul Karim, who ordered the charges against the thirteen accused, asked Bangladeshi publications to publish images of three of Rajon's accused murderers: Kamrul Islam, Shamim Ahmed and Pavel Islam. Kamrul Islam, the primary individual accused in the case, fled to Saudi Arabia after the murder but was arrested by Jeddah police.
