= Munsi Kabir Uddin Ahmed =

Munsi Kabir Uddin Ahmed was the superintendent of police of Comilla District who was killed in the Bangladesh Liberation War. He was killed for refusing to give the Pakistan Army based in Comilla Cantonment the police armory. He was posthumously awarded the Independence Day Award, the highest civilian award, in 2014.

AKM Samsul Haque Khan, Deputy Commissioner, ordered the Superintendent of Police in Comilla District, Ahmed, to stop cooperating with the Pakistan Army. On 24 March 1971, hours before the start of Operation Searchlight on 25 March, AKM Samsul Haque Khan was detained along with Ahmed. He was never seen again. According to Anthony Mascarenhas both of them were executed by Pakistan Army.
