= Rickshaw van =

Type of rickshaw

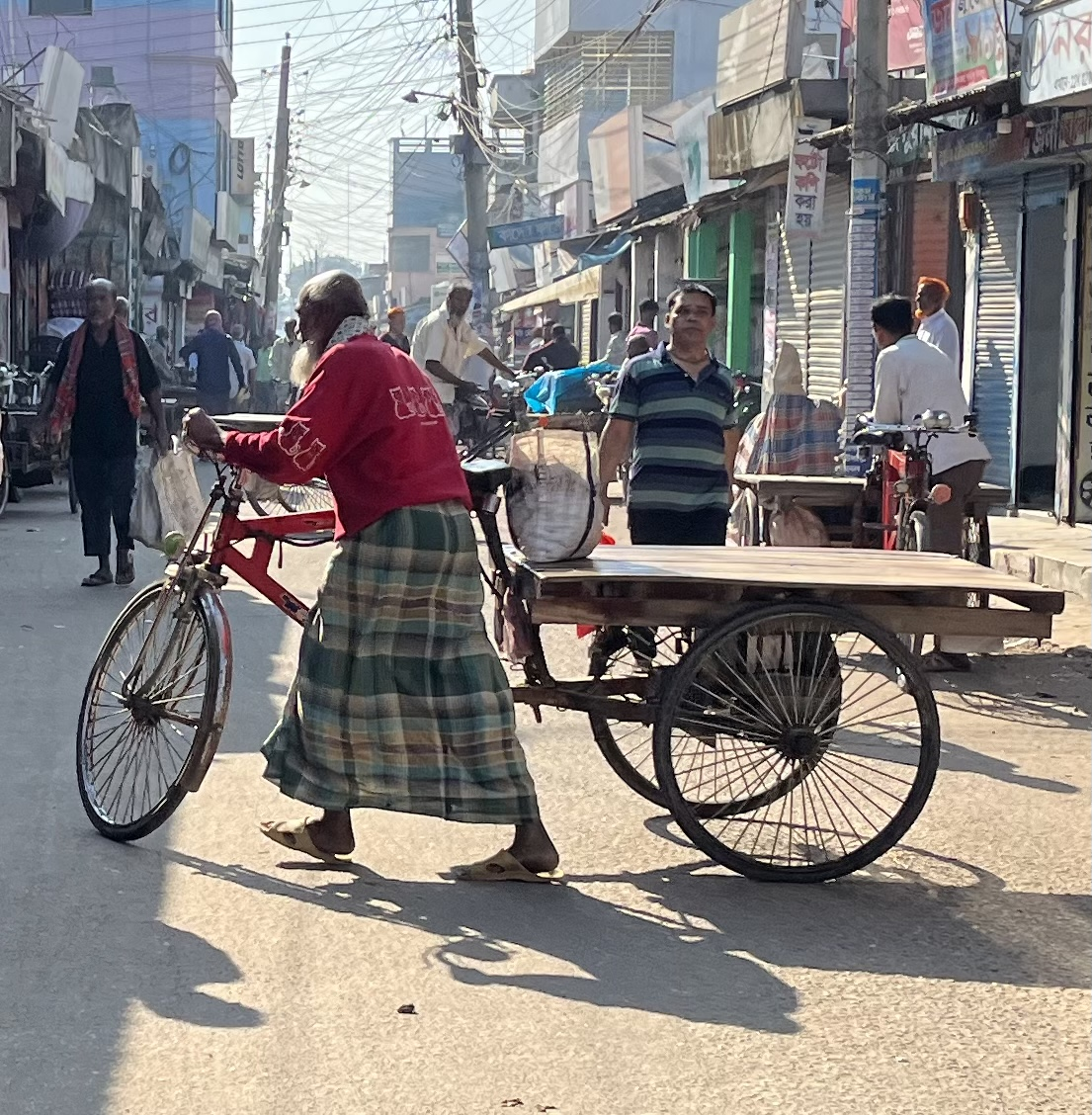
Van-gari

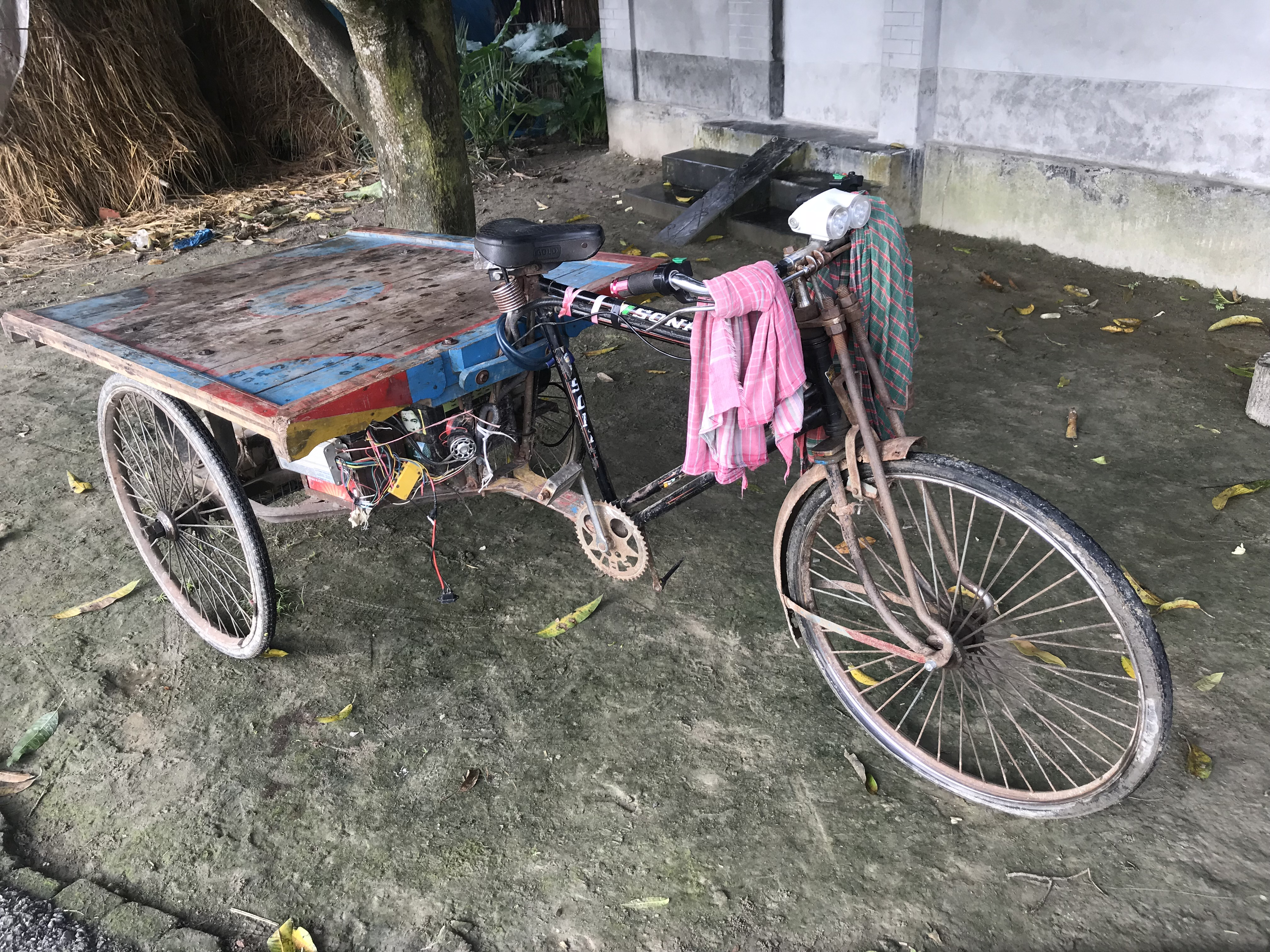
Battery-operated van-gari

A rickshaw van (Bengali: রিকশা ভ্যান) or van-gari (Bengali: ভ্যান গাড়ি) is a three-wheeled bicycle with a large wooden platform on the back part, used primarily to transport people and goods. It is a common mode of transportation in Bangladesh and India, popular because of its cheap price. Furthermore, it does not require fossil fuels or cause air pollution.

The wooden platform is approximately four foot square. Sometimes, steel is used in the platform for durability. It can carry up to approximately 330 kg loads or seven people. Sometimes, it is used as an ambulance. It can be also used as a mobile cart to sell goods particularly among those of lower income groups.

One or more chains are used to connect the pedal with the back two wheels. The work can be very strenuous. However, some of the vehicles are battery-operated. This enables physically challenged individuals to be van-gari drivers.
