= M Abdul Ali =

Bengali civil servant

M Abdul Ali was a Bengali civil servant in the government of Pakistan stationed in Rangamati who was killed during the Bangladesh Liberation War. He was the district commissioner of Rangamati District was killed by the Pakistan military. He was posthumously awarded the Independence Day Award, the highest civilian award in Bangladesh.

Rangamati 'Shaheed Abdul Ali Maunch' memorial was built outside the Rangamati District Commissioner's office. Rangamati Shaheed Abdul Ali Academy School and College was named after him.

Ali had a daughter, Nazma Akther.
