= M Quamruzzaman =

M Quamruzzaman is a Bangladeshi academic and principal. He was awarded the Independence Award, the highest civilian award in Bangladesh, in 2014 posthumously for his contribution to education.
