= Enamul Haque (museologist) =

Bangladeshi museologist (1937–2022)

- এনামুল হক
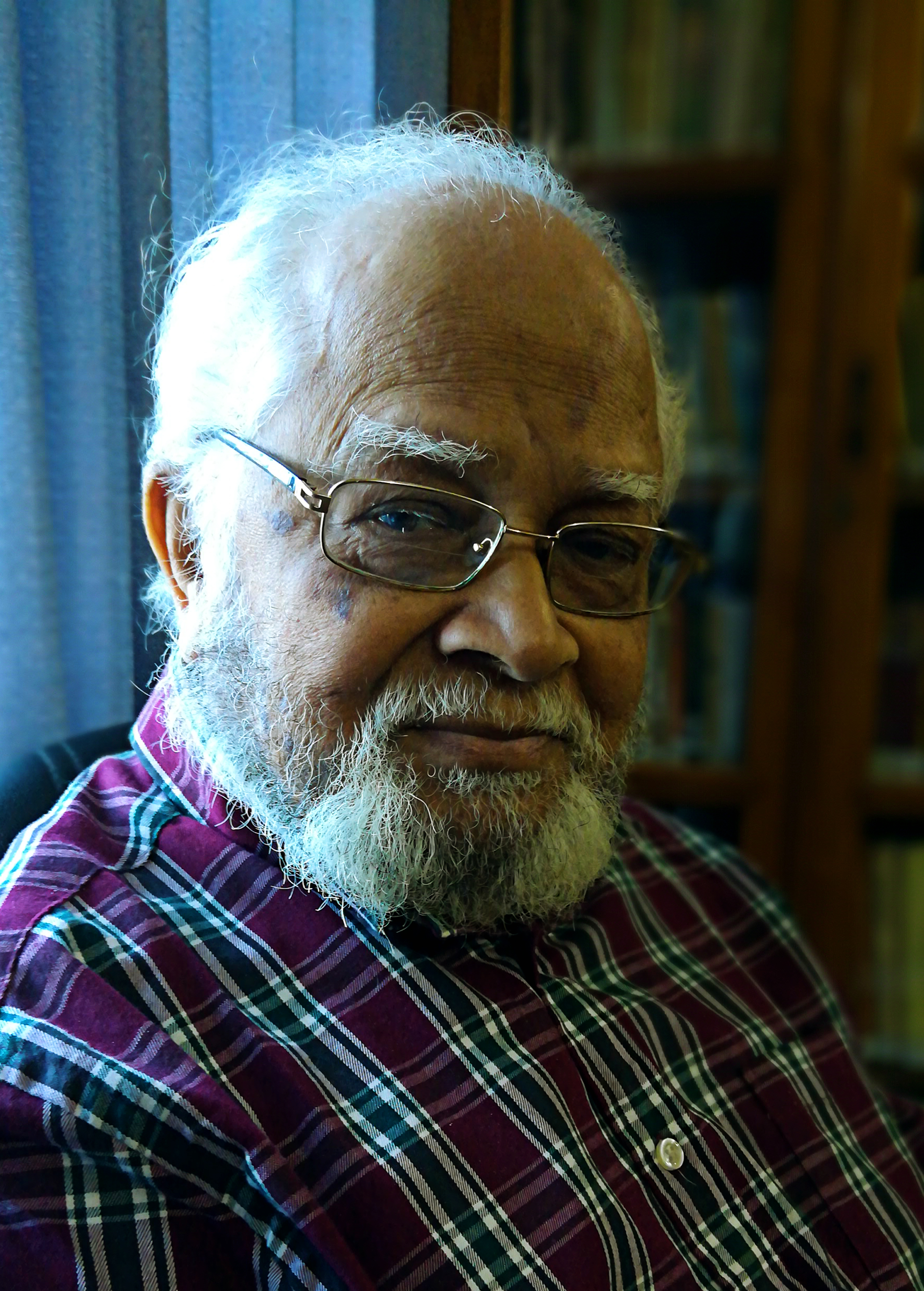
- Enamul Haque in 2018
- Born: 1 March 1937; Bogra, Bengal Presidency, British India
- Died: 10 July 2022 (aged 85); Dhaka, Bangladesh
- Education: PhD
- Alma mater: University of Dhaka; Oxford University
- Awards: full list

Enamul Haque (1 March 1937 – 10 July 2022) was a Bangladeshi museologist. He was awarded Ekushey Padak in 2014 and Independence Day Award in 2017 by the Government of Bangladesh. In 2020, Enamul Haque was also awarded the Padma Shri award (India's 4th Highest civilian award) for his tremendous contribution in the field of archeology and museology by the Government of India.

== Education and career ==
Enamul Haque completed his bachelor's in history and master's in archaeological history from the University of Dhaka. He later earned his PhD on South Asian Art from the University of Oxford. He got his post-graduate Diploma-in-Museology from London.

Enamul Haque joined Dhaka Museum (later Bangladesh National Museum) in 1962. He became the principal in 1965, director in 1969 and Director General during 1983–1991.

He was also elected as the President of the International Council of Museums Asia-Pacific Organization for the period 1983–86. He served as the professor of national culture and heritage in the Independent University, Bangladesh and the president, chairman and academic director of the International Centre for Study of Bengal Art.

== Death ==
Enamul Haque died at his residence in Dhaka, Bangladesh, on 10 July 2022.

== Honors and awards ==
- Bangladesh Shishu Academy Agrani Bank Literary Award (1986)
- Honorary International Councilor of the Asia Society of New York (1986–92)
- Ramaprasad Chanda Centenary Medal by the Asiatic Society of Calcutta (1993)
- D.Sc. honoris causa by Open University of Alternative Medicines of India (1998)
- Rich Foundation Award (2012)
- Ekushey Padak (2014)
- Indepene Day Award (2017)
- Padma Shri, India's fourth highest civilian award (2020)

== Works ==
- Dhaka alias Jahangirnagar: 400 years (2009)
