= Quamrul Haider =

Quamrul Haider is a Bangladeshi-American professor of physics at Fordham University. He was awarded the Independence Award, the highest civilian award in Bangladesh.

== Early life and edudcation ==
Haider completed his bachelor's and master's in Physics at the University of Dhaka. He finished his second master's in Physics at the University of Illinois Chicago. He completed his PhD in physics at the Indiana University Bloomington.

== Career ==
Haider worked as a research associate at Los Alamos. He then worked as a research associate at the Lawrence Livermore National Laboratory.

In 1988, Haider joined the physics department at Fordham University.

In 2012, Haider was awarded the Independence Award.

== Books ==
On Fusion Between Light and Medium-light Heavy Ions
