= Syeda Badrun Nahar Chowdhury =

Bangladeshi physician

- সৈয়দা বদরুন নাহার চৌধুরী
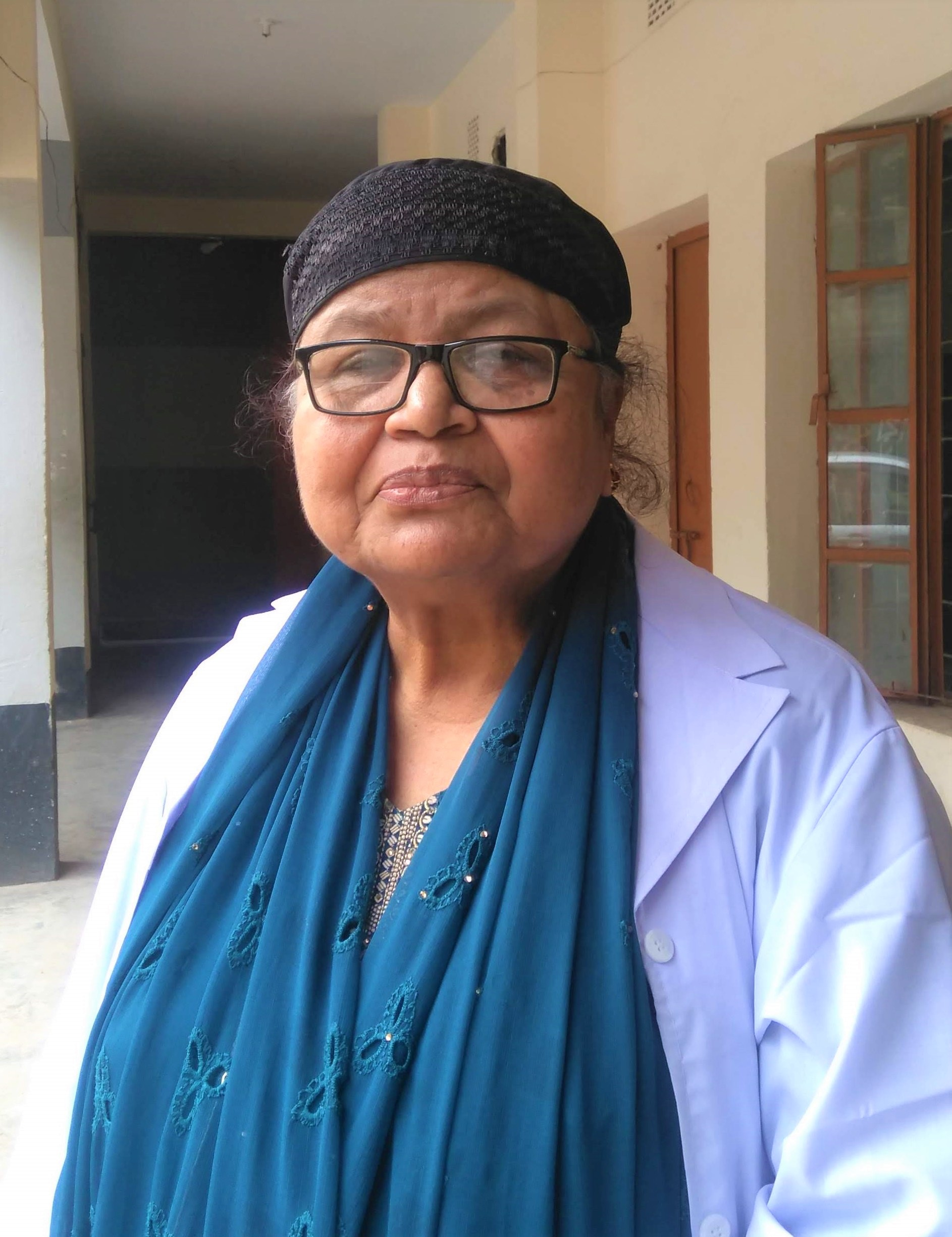
- Born: 15 January 1950 (age 76); Mymensingh
- Occupation: physician
- Awards: Independence Day Award (2012)

Syeda Badrun Nahar Chowdhury is a Bangladeshi physician and former additional director general of Directorate General of Health Services. She was awarded Independence Day Award in 2012 by the Government of Bangladesh for her contributions to the independence and Bangladesh Liberation War. Chowdhury provided medical care services to the freedom fighters and repressed women during the Bangladesh War of Independence in 1971.

== War of Independence ==
During the Bangladesh War of Liberation in 1971, Chowdhury operated in Chandpur and Comilla areas to render medical services to the freedom fighters.

== Personal life ==
Chowdhury is married to Freedom fighter Tafazzal Haider Nassu Chowdhury. Nassu is a former municipal chairman of Hajiganj upazila of Chandpur district. Her home is Dharara Chowdhury house in municipal area.
