= Zillur Rahman Siddiqui =

Bangladeshi educationist

- জিল্লুর রহমান সিদ্দিকী

Advisor for Education
- In office 10 December 1990 – 16 March 1991
- Preceded by: Kazi Zafar Ahmed
- Succeeded by: A. Q. M. Badruddoza Chowdhury

Personal details
- Born: 23 February 1928
- Died: 11 November 2014 (aged 86)
- Education: University of Dhaka
- Occupation: Professor, writer

Zillur Rahman Siddiqui (23 February 1928 – 11 November 2014) was a Bangladeshi writer, academic and educationist.

== Career ==
Siddiqui was a professor of English at Rajshahi University. He served as a vice-chancellor of Jahangirnagar University from 1976 to 1984.

== Works ==
Siddiqui authored around 40 books in Bengali and English. He edited the literary quarterly Purbamegh. He edited the dictionary, Bangla Academy English-Bengali Dictionary.

== Awards ==
- Alaol Sahitya Purashkar (1977)
- Bangla Academy Literary Award (1979)
- Independence Day Award
- Kazi Mahbub Ullah Begum Zebunnisa Trust Award (1990)
- Alokto Sahitya Purashkar (1998)
- MA Haque Swarna Padak (2003)
