= Mohammad Hossain Mondol =

Bangladeshi agriculturist and researcher

- মোহাম্মদ হোসেন মণ্ডল
- Born: 1935; Palashbari, Gaibandha
- Died: 19 June 2017 (aged 81–82); Dhaka
- Known for: Agricultural research
- Awards: Independence Day Award (2015)

Mohammad Hossain Mondol (1935 – 19 June 2018) was a Bangladeshi agriculturist and researcher. He received the Independence Award in 2015 for his contribution to research and training.

== Early life ==
Islam was born in Tengra village of Palashbari Upazila, Gaibandha District.

== Career ==
Islam served as the Director General of Bangladesh Agricultural Research Institute.

Islam received the Independence Day Award in 2015 in recognition of his contribution to research and training.
