= Khasruzzaman Chowdhury =

Khasruzzaman Chowdhury was a Bangladeshi civil servant and former Pakistani civil servant. He was born in Astoghori village of Purba Muria, Beanibazar Upazila, Sylhet District. He was the sub-divisional commissioner of Kishorganj District and participated in the Bangladesh Liberation War in 1971. He was awarded the Independence Day Award, the highest civilian award, in 2014 for his contribution to the Bangladesh Liberation War.

Chowdhury completed his master's degree in economics at Harvard University. He did his PhD at Syracuse University.

Chowdhury had joined the East Pakistan Civil Service. He was a batchmate of Kazi Rakibuddin Ahmad, and Mizanur Rahman Shelley. He joined the Ministry of Home Affairs of the Provisional Government of Bangladesh during the Bangladesh Liberation War. He was appointed the deputy commissioner of Mymensingh Division after the independence of Bangladesh.

Chowdhury was the secretary of Bangladesh National Commission for UNESCO. He wrote an autobiography, The Turbulent 1971: My diary.

Chowdhury died on 4 February 2013.
