= SBM Mizanur Rahman =

SBM Mizanur Rahman was a Bengali officer of the Pakistan Civil Service. He fought in the Bangladesh Liberation War and died on 5 May 1971 in Pirojpur District. Bangladesh Post Office issued a stamp with his face in 1996. He was awarded the Independence Award, the highest civilian award in Bangladesh, posthumously for contributing to the Bangladesh Liberation War in 2014.
