= Kazi Azizul Islam =

Bengali-Pakistani civil servant

Kazi Azizul Islam was a Bengali-Pakistani civil servant who was killed in the Bangladesh Liberation war.

Islam was the additional deputy commissioner of Barisal District in 1971. After the start of Bangladesh Liberation war, he declared his allegiance to the separatist Bengali administration on 27 March 1971. On 5 May 1971, he came to Barisal to evacuate his family but was captured by Pakistan Army. He was tortured and executed.

In 2014, Islam was awarded Independence Day Award for his contribution to the Bangladesh Liberation war. In 2014, a monument was built in Barisal, near his grave, to commemorate him.
