= Ashraful Alam (singer) =

Bangladeshi singer

Ashraful Alam is a Bangladesh singer and recipient of the Independence Award, the highest civilian award in Bangladesh.

== Career ==
In 1971, during the Bangladesh Liberation War Alam worked at Swadhin Bangla Betar Kendra.

Alam was awarded the Independence Day Award in 2017.
