= 2010 in Bangladesh =

- Centuries: 20th; 21st
- Decades: 1990s; 2000s; 2010s; 2020s
- See also: Other events of 2010; List of years in Bangladesh

2010 (MMX) was a common year starting on Friday of the Gregorian calendar, the 2010th year of the Common Era (CE) and Anno Domini (AD) designations, the 10th year of the 3rd millennium and the 21st century, and the 1st year of the 2010s decade.

The year 2010 was the 39th year after the independence of Bangladesh. It was also the second year of the second term of the Government of Sheikh Hasina.

== Incumbents ==
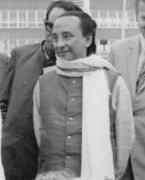
President
Zillur
Rahman

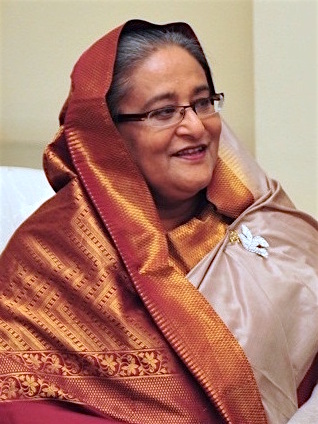
Sheikh
Hasina

- President: Zillur Rahman
- Prime Minister: Sheikh Hasina
- Chief Justice: Md. Tafazzul Islam (until 7 February 2010), Mohammad Fazlul Karim (from 8 February to 30 September 2010), A.B.M. Khairul Haque (from 1 October 2010)

== Demography ==
Demographic Indicators for Bangladesh in 2010
Population, total	147,575,433
Population density (per km^{2})	1133.7
Population growth (annual %)	1.1%
Male to Female Ratio (every 100 Female)	103.4
Urban population (% of total)	30.5%
Birth rate, crude (per 1,000 people)	21.1
Death rate, crude (per 1,000 people)	5.7
Mortality rate, under 5 (per 1,000 live births)	49
Life expectancy at birth, total (years)	69.9
Fertility rate, total (births per woman)	2.3

== Climate ==
Climate data for Bangladesh in 2010
Month	Jan	Feb	Mar	Apr	May	Jun	Jul	Aug	Sep	Oct	Nov	Dec	Year
Daily mean °C (°F)	18.6 (65.5)	21.7 (71.1)	27.0 (80.6)	29.3 (84.7)	28.7 (83.7)	28.7 (83.7)	28.7 (83.7)	28.9 (84.0)	28.6 (83.5)	27.9 (82.2)	25.0 (77.0)	19.9 (67.8)	26.1 (79.0)
Average precipitation mm (inches)	0.0 (0.0)	4.5 (0.18)	117.2 (4.61)	279.1 (10.99)	264.9 (10.43)	390.2 (15.36)	314.8 (12.39)	255.1 (10.04)	285.0 (11.22)	173.9 (6.85)	9.6 (0.38)	16.1 (0.63)	2,110.4 (83.08)
Source: Climatic Research Unit (CRU) of University of East Anglia (UEA)

== Economy ==
Key Economic Indicators for Bangladesh in 2010
National Income
	Current US$	Current BDT	% of GDP
GDP	$115.3 billion	BDT8.0 trillion	
GDP growth (annual %)	5.6%		
GDP per capita	$781.2	BDT54,043	
Agriculture, value added	$19.6 billion	BDT1.4 trillion	17.0%
Industry, value added	$28.8 billion	BDT2.0 trillion	25.0%
Services, etc., value added	$61.7 billion	BDT4.3 trillion	53.5%
Balance of Payment
	Current US$	Current BDT	% of GDP
Current account balance	$2.1 billion		1.8%
Imports of goods and services	$29.5 billion	BDT1.7 trillion	21.8%
Exports of goods and services	$21,654.5 million	BDT1.3 trillion	16.0%
Foreign direct investment, net inflows	$1,232.3 million		1.1%
Personal remittances, received	$10,850.2 million		9.4%
Total reserves (includes gold) at year end	$11,174.8 million		
Total reserves in months of imports	4.3		

Note: For the year 2010 average official exchange rate for BDT was 69.65 per US$.

== Events ==
=== Major events by month ===
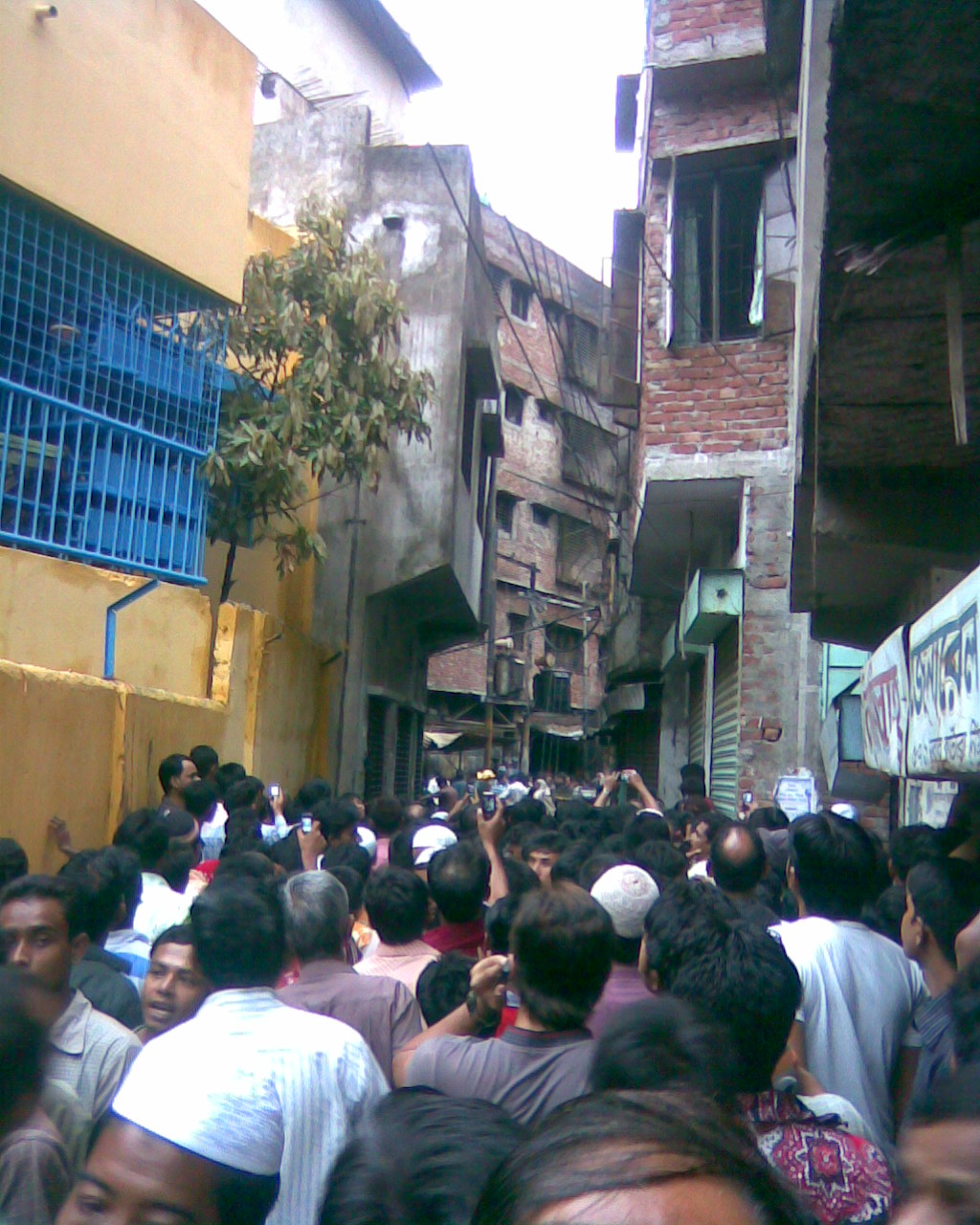
Crowd of curious people day after the 3 June 2010 fire. The burnt buildings can be seen at the centre.

==== February ====
- 25 February: A fire at the Garib & Garib Sweater Factory clothes factory in Gazipur, Bangladesh kills at least 18 people and injures more than 50 others.

==== March ====
- 24 March: Tiny South Talpatti Island off the coast of Bengal disappears, washed away thirty years after the mud flat island was created by delta currents, ending the Indian and Bangladeshi dispute over the territory.
- 25 March: International War Crime Tribunal is formed in the purpose of justice for 1971 genocide.

==== April ====
- 8 April: The Bangladesh Army distributes drinking water among more than 12 million people in Dhaka as fears grow over the city's water crisis.
- 8 April: 29 paramilitary troops are convicted of mutiny and imprisoned for up to seven years at a Bangladeshi tribunal.
- 17 April: A severe storm strikes Bangladesh and eastern India, killing more than 100 people and destroying over 50,000 homes.

==== May ====
- 23 May: Musa Ibrahim becomes the first Bangladeshi mountain climber to reach the top of Mount Everest. He reached the summit around 5:05 am BST on 23 May 2010 and hoisted the flag of Bangladesh on the apex of the world at around 5:16 am BST. From then, Bangladesh became the 67th Mount Everest conquering country.

==== June ====
- 3 June: At least 116 people are killed and more than 100 injured in a large fire in Dhaka, Bangladesh.

==== October ====
- 13 October: Bangladesh Climate Change Trust is established through the passage of the Climate Change Trust Act, 2010.
- 17 October: Bangladesh Cricket Team whitewashes New Zealand national cricket team, getting a flawless 5-0 ODI series win, during the New Zealand cricket team tour of Bangladesh.

==== November ====
- 20 November: Holly Islamic festival, the Eid-ul-Azha is celebrated in the whole country.

=== Awards and recognitions ===
==== International Recognition ====
- A.H.M. Noman Khan, a community leader promoting the cause of disabled people, was awarded Ramon Magsaysay Award.
- Fazle Hasan Abed, founder of BRAC, was awarded Honorary Knighthood by the Queen Elizabeth II.
- Muhammad Yunus, founder of Grameen Bank, was presented Congressional Gold Medal awarded by United States Congress.

==== Independence Day Award ====
Recipients	Area	Note
AKM Samsul Haque Khan	independence & liberation war	posthumous
Syeda Sajeda Chowdhury	independence & liberation war	
Belal Muhammad	independence & liberation war	
Prof Zillur Rahman Siddiqui	education	
Jatin Sarker	education	
Romena Afaz	Literature	posthumous
Mustafa Nurul Islam	Literature	
Waheedul Haq	culture	posthumously
Alamgir Kabir	culture	posthumous
Ferdousi Priyabhashini	culture	
Bangla Academy	culture	

==== Ekushey Padak ====
1. Sayeed Ahmed, literature (posthumous)
2. Mohammad Alam, photojournalism (posthumous)
3. Ahmed Imtiaz Bulbul, music artiste
4. Hanif Sangket, social personality
5. Laila Hasan, artiste
6. Imdad Hossain, artist
7. Helena Khan, literature
8. Partha Pratim Majumder, mime artiste
9. Muntassir Mamoon, research
10. Sangharaj Jyotipal Mohathero, social personality (posthumous)
11. Golam Moula, Language Movement (posthumous)
12. Mohammad Rafiq, literature
13. AKM Abdur Rouf, artist (posthumous)
14. ASHK Sadik, social personality (posthumous)
15. Nasiruddin Yousuff, artiste

=== Sports ===
- Asian Games:
  - Bangladesh participated at the 16th Asian Games in Guangzhou, China. Bangladesh won a gold, a silver and a bronze medal in the tournament. They won the gold and silver in men's and women's Cricket, while the Bangladesh national kabaddi team won bronze medal in kabaddi.
- Commonwealth Games:
  - Bangladesh participated in the 2010 Commonwealth Games held in Delhi, India. Shooter Asif Hossain Khan and Abdullah Hel Baki won bronze medal in Men's 10m Air Rifle (Pairs).
- South Asian (Federation) Games:
  - Bangladesh hosted the 2010 South Asian Federation Games from 29 January to 8 February. With 18 golds, 23 silvers and 56 bronzes Bangladesh ended the tournament at the third position in overall points table.
- Football:
  - Bangladesh participated in the 2010 AFC Challenge Cup held in Sri Lanka. They started the tournament well by defeating strong Tajikistan, but then lost to Myanmar and Sri Lanka to exit the tournament from the group stage.

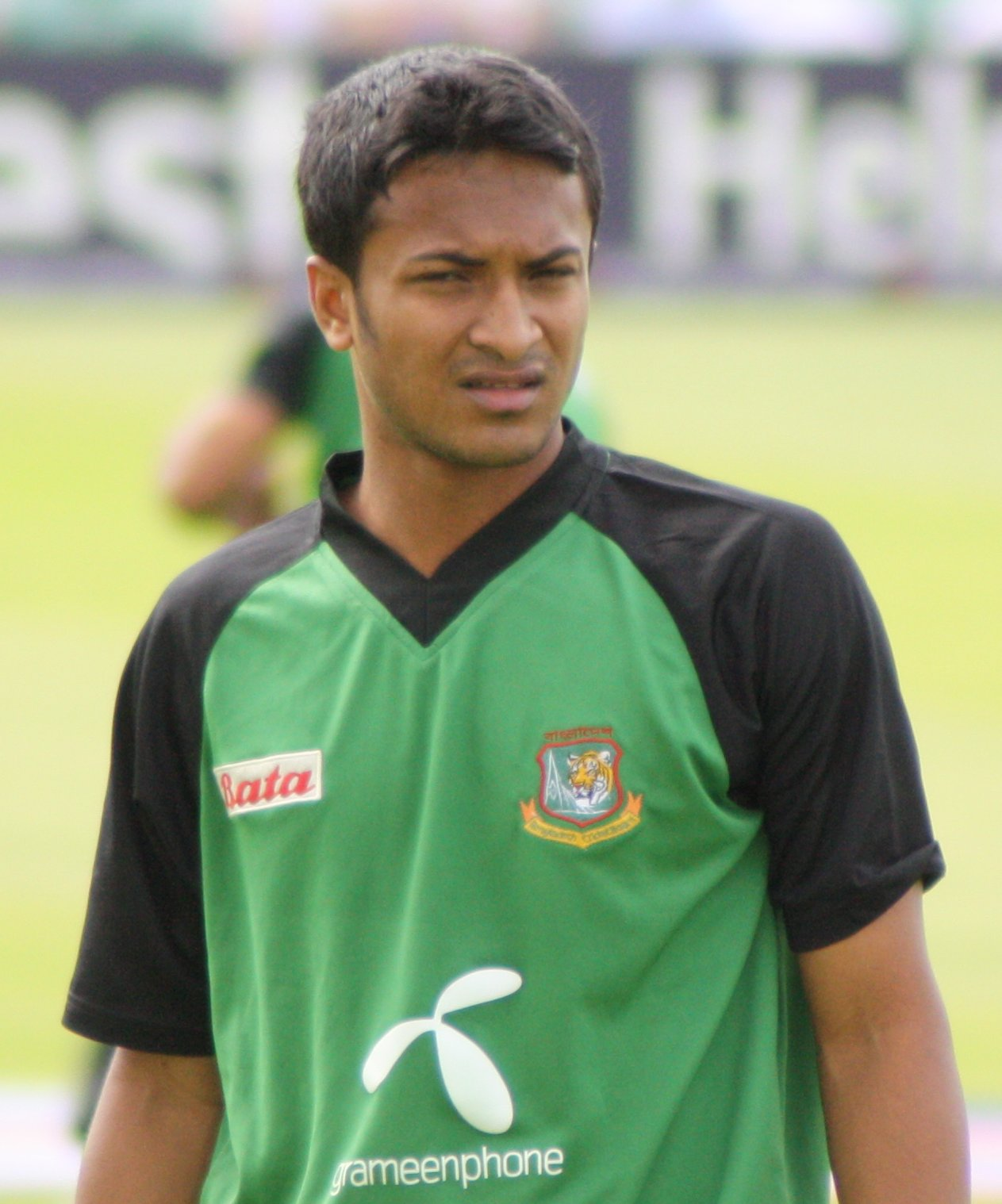
Shakib Al Hasan

- Cricket:
  - In January India visited Bangladesh to play 2 test matches, which they won. The test series was followed by a tri-series involving the host Bangladesh, India and Sri Lanka. Bangladesh did not manage to win any match in the series.
  - Bangladesh toured New Zealand for a single Test match, a three-match ODI series, and one Twenty20 International from 3 to 19 February. This was 'The National Bank' Series. Bangladesh lost all their matched on this tour.
  - Later in March, The England cricket team toured Bangladesh to play three One Day Internationals (ODI) and two Test matches. The visitors won all the matches.
  - Then The Bangladesh cricket team toured England, playing three One Day Internationals and two Test matches between 27 May and 12 July and again returned without any victory.
  - The New Zealand cricket team toured Bangladesh from 5 to 17 October 2010. Five One Day Internationals (ODIs) were scheduled: Bangladesh won four and the other was abandoned without play. This was Bangladesh's first series victory against a full-strength Test-playing nation (excepting the West Indies series plagued by strike). Shakib Al Hasan was the player of the series.
  - The Zimbabwe national cricket team toured Bangladesh, playing 5 ODI matches from 1 to 12 December. Bangladesh won the 5 match series 4–1.
- Golf:
  - Bangladeshi golfer Siddikur Rahman won Brunei Open as part of 2010 Asian Tour.

== See also ==
- 2010s in Bangladesh
- List of Bangladeshi films of 2010
- Timeline of Bangladeshi history
