= 2011 in Bangladesh =

- Centuries: 20th; 21st
- Decades: 1990s; 2000s; 2010s; 2020s
- See also: Other events of 2011; List of years in Bangladesh

2011 (MMXI) was a common year starting on Saturday of the Gregorian calendar, the 2011th year of the Common Era (CE) and Anno Domini (AD) designations, the 11th year of the 3rd millennium and the 21st century, and the 2nd year of the 2010s decade.

The year 2011 was the 40th year after the independence of Bangladesh. It was also the third year of the second term of the Government of Sheikh Hasina.

== Incumbents ==
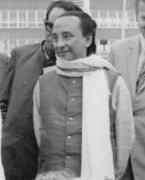
Zillur
Rahman

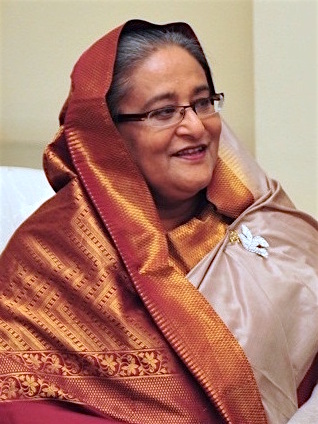
Sheikh
Hasina

- President: Zillur Rahman
- Prime Minister: Sheikh Hasina
- Chief Justice: A.B.M. Khairul Haque (until 15 May 2011), Md. Muzammel Hossain (from 16 May 2011).

== Demography ==
Demographic Indicators for Bangladesh in 2011
Population, total	149,273,134
Population density (per km^{2})	1146.8
Population growth (annual %)	1.1%
Male to Female Ratio (every 100 Female)	103.2
Urban population (% of total)	31.2%
Birth rate, crude (per 1,000 people)	20.7
Death rate, crude (per 1,000 people)	5.7
Mortality rate, under 5 (per 1,000 live births)	46
Life expectancy at birth, total (years)	70.3
Fertility rate, total (births per woman)	2.3

== Climate ==
Climate data for Bangladesh in 2011
Month	Jan	Feb	Mar	Apr	May	Jun	Jul	Aug	Sep	Oct	Nov	Dec	Year
Daily mean °C (°F)	17.9 (64.2)	21.2 (70.2)	25.3 (77.5)	27.6 (81.7)	28.1 (82.6)	28.6 (83.5)	28.3 (82.9)	28.0 (82.4)	28.2 (82.8)	27.4 (81.3)	23.8 (74.8)	20.2 (68.4)	25.4 (77.7)
Average precipitation mm (inches)	3.4 (0.13)	17.2 (0.68)	15.8 (0.62)	65.5 (2.58)	248.7 (9.79)	656.3 (25.84)	382.6 (15.06)	834.4 (32.85)	188.9 (7.44)	22.2 (0.87)	7.4 (0.29)	0.3 (0.01)	2,442.7 (96.16)
Source: Climatic Research Unit (CRU) of University of East Anglia (UEA)

== Economy ==
Key Economic Indicators for Bangladesh in 2011
National Income
	Current US$	Current BDT	% of GDP
GDP	$128.6 billion	BDT9.2 trillion	
GDP growth (annual %)	6.5%		
GDP per capita	$861.8	BDT61,353	
Agriculture, value added	$21.6 billion	BDT1.5 trillion	16.8%
Industry, value added	$32.2 billion	BDT2.3 trillion	25.0%
Services, etc., value added	$68.2 billion	BDT4.9 trillion	53.0%
Balance of Payment
	Current US$	Current BDT	% of GDP
Current account balance	-$0.2 billion		-.1%
Imports of goods and services	$37.9 billion	BDT2.5 trillion	27.5%
Exports of goods and services	$26,990.1 million	BDT1.8 trillion	19.9%
Foreign direct investment, net inflows	$1,264.7 million		1.0%
Personal remittances, received	$12,071.1 million		9.4%
Total reserves (includes gold) at year end	$9,174.7 million		
Total reserves in months of imports	2.8		

Note: For the year 2011 average official exchange rate for BDT was 74.15 per US$.

== Events ==
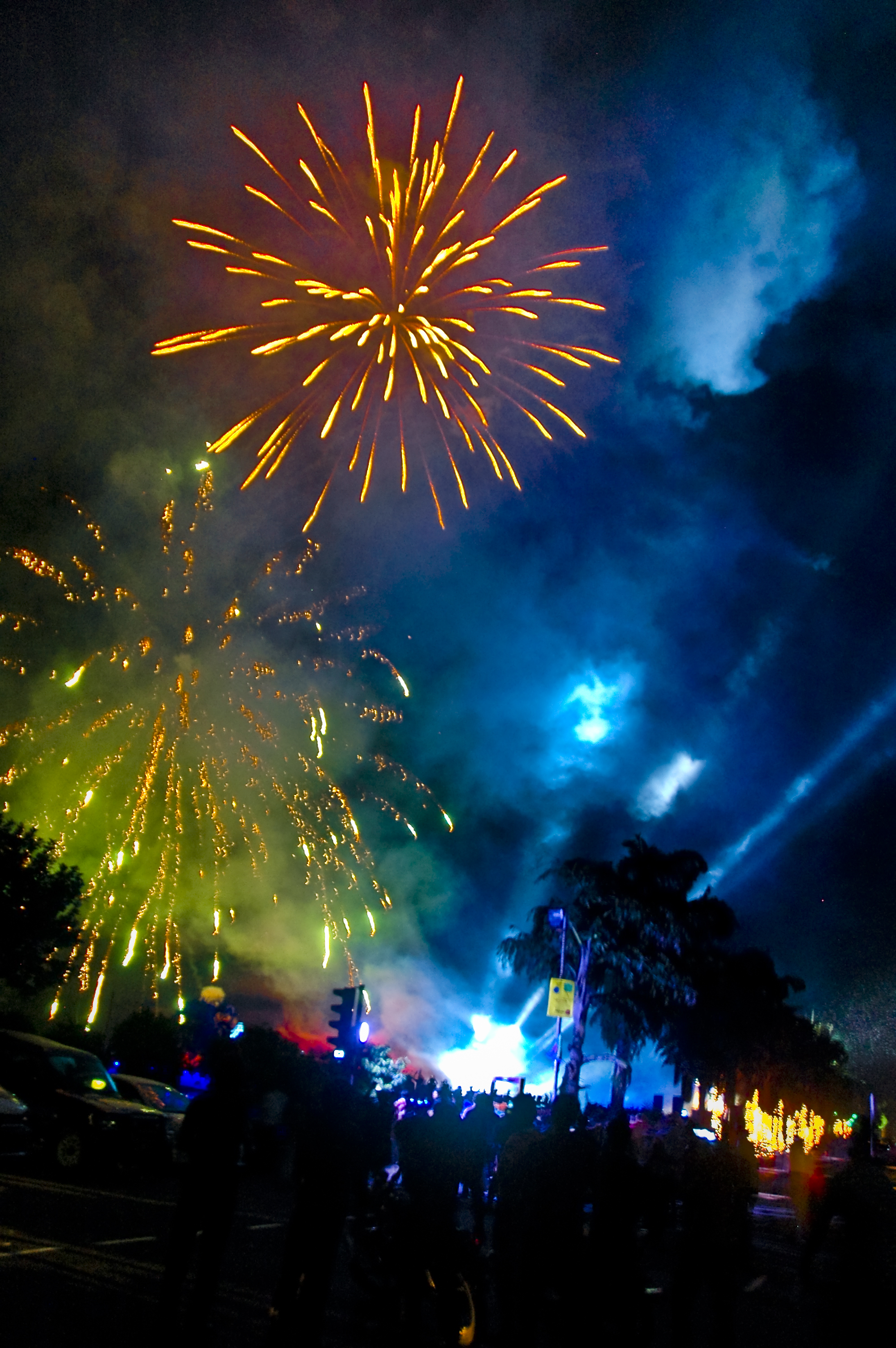
Fireworks at the world cup opening ceremony

- 7 January – Widespread outrage at the killing of Felani Khatun a 15-year-old Bangladeshi girl, who was shot and killed by India's Border Security Force (BSF), at India-Bangladesh border.
- 17 February – Bangladesh co-hosted the ICC Cricket World Cup with India and Sri Lanka. The Opening Ceremony of the event was held in the venue Bangabandhu National Stadium in Dhaka.
- 11 July – At least 40 people, including 38 students, were killed when a pick-up truck carrying them veered off the road and plunged into a roadside ditch at Mayani area of Mirsharai Upazila.
- 13 August – Acclaimed film director Tareque Masud and his long-time co-worker Mishuk Munier, a cinematographer, a journalist and CEO of ATN News died in a road accident on the Dhaka-Aricha highway at Joka under Ghior Upazila while returning to Dhaka from Manikganj after visiting a shooting location.
- 5 September – India and Bangladesh sign a pact to end their 40-year border demarcation dispute.
- 16 October – Small share market investors went on a fast-unto-death after forming the Bangladesh Capital Market Investors' Council in response to the bear run in the share market since end of 2010. Opposition politicians declared their solidarity with the protesters.
- 22 October – The market stabilisation fund (MSF), worth BDT 50 billion ($ 667 million), was conceived by the Bangladesh Association of Banks (BAB) as a method to increase liquidity in the market and increase share prices, in response to share market scam.
- December: A planned coup to establish Islamic law in Bangladesh was stopped by the Bangladesh Army. A number of officers including retired ones were arrested.

=== Awards and Recognitions ===
==== Independence Day Award ====
Recipients	Area	Note
Dhaka University	education	organization
Bangladesh Police	liberation war	organization
Gaus Khan	liberation war	posthumous
Sanghraj Jyotipal Mahathero	liberation war	posthumous
Dr Nilima Ibrahim	liberation war	posthumous
Air Vice Marshal (retd) Abdul Karim Khandaker	liberation war	
Nutan Chandra Singha	liberation war	posthumous
AKM Samsuzzoha	liberation war	posthumous
Muhammad Abul Hashem Khan	culture	

==== Bangladesh Freedom Honour ====
The highest state award given by the government of Bangladesh for foreigners or non-nationals was posthumously conferred on former Indian prime minister Indira Gandhi on 25 July 2011. The award recognises her role as an ally during the Bangladeshi war of independence and her capacity to manage such a complex regional war. A Bangladeshi national committee had nominated her for the special honour for her "unique" role in "offering training to freedom fighters and refuge to millions of people who fled the country and building world opinion for Bangladesh's independence". Indian National Congress Party president Sonia Gandhi, the daughter -in-law of Indira Gandhi, received the award from Bangladeshi President Zillur Rahman at a grand ceremony in Dhaka attended by Prime Minister Sheikh Hasina and nearly 1,000 top dignitaries.

==== Ekushey Padak ====
1. Mosharef Uddin Ahmed, Language Movement (posthumous)
2. Shawkat Ali, Language Movement (posthumous)
3. Nurjahan Begum, journalism
4. Jyotsna Biswas, performing arts
5. Abdul Haq Choudhury, research (posthumous)
6. Abdul Haq, language and literature
7. Amanul Haque, Language Movement
8. Md Abul Hashem, social service
9. Mohammed Delwar Hossain, social service
10. Shaheed Quaderi, language and literature
11. Ustad Akthar Sadmani, performing arts (posthumous)
12. Abdul Karim Shah, performing arts
13. Polan Sarkar, social service

=== Sports ===
- Football:
  - Bangladesh competed in the Group A of 2012 AFC Challenge Cup qualification held in Myanmar in March. Although Bangladesh secured a surprise victory over the hosts, they lost to Palestine and Philippines to exit the tournament without qualifying.
  - In August, the youth team competed in the 2011 SAFF U-16 Championship held in Nepal. Bangladesh secured fourth position in the tournament.
  - In November the national team competed in the 2011 SAFF Championship held in New Delhi, India. Bangladesh could not secure any victory in the tournament.
  - Sheikh Jamal Dhanmondi Club secured their first title of Premier League.
- Cricket:
  - Bangladesh co-hosted with India and Sri Lanka the 2011 Cricket World Cup from February to April 2011. Bangladesh did not fare well and failed in qualifying for quarter-finals stage. Other than victories against Associate members, their only notable victory was against England.
  - The Australian cricket team toured Bangladesh between 7 and 13 April. The tour consisted of three One Day Internationals (ODIs). Australia won all the matches in the tour
  - The Bangladesh cricket team toured Zimbabwe from 4 to 21 August. The tour consisted of one Test match and five One Day Internationals (ODIs) played against the Zimbabwean national team and one first-class match played against a Zimbabwean representative team. The Test match was Zimbabwe's first since India toured Zimbabwe in 2005. Zimbabwe won the Test match by 130 runs and also won the one-day series 3–2.
  - The West Indies toured Bangladesh in October 2011 and playing two Test matches, the West Indies winning the second, the first being a drawn game. West Indies played three limited overs internationals, winning the series 2–1. Bangladesh won a T20I by 3 wickets.
  - Pakistan toured from 29 November to 21 December 2011, playing one Twenty20 International (T20I), three One Day Internationals (ODIs) and two Test matches, Pakistan winning all matches.

== Deaths ==
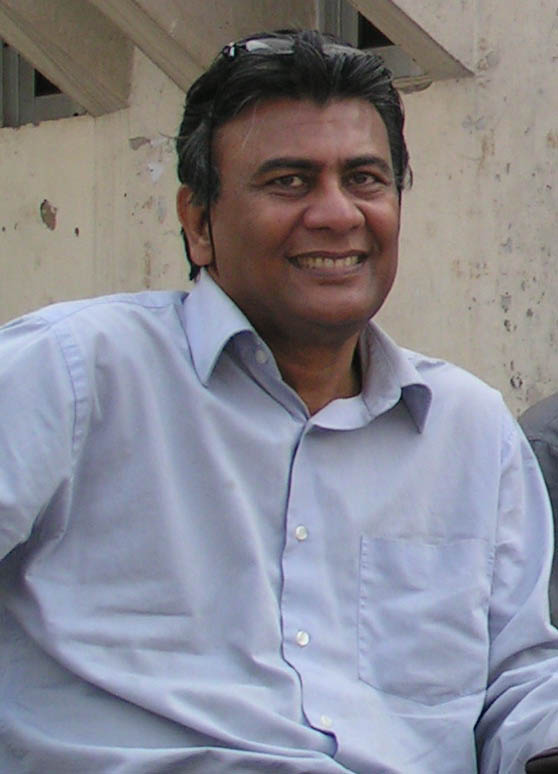
Tareque
Masud

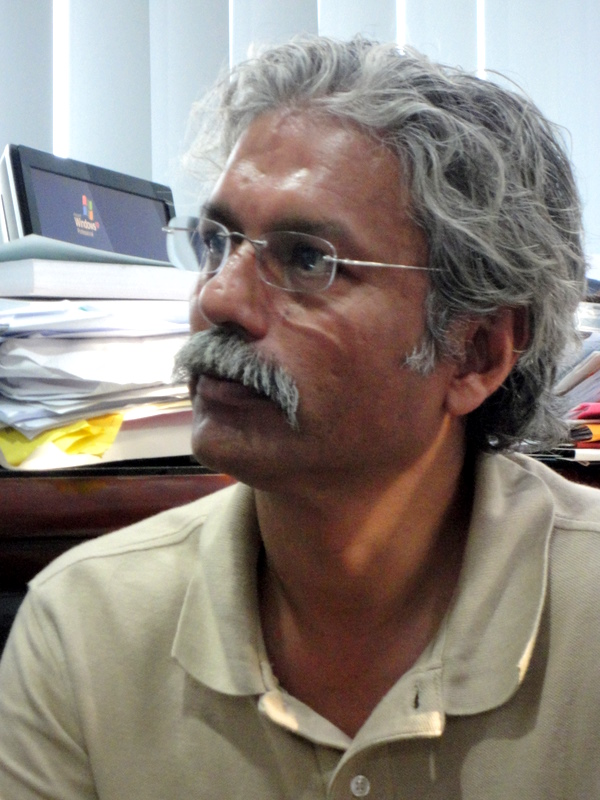
Mishuk
Munier

- 27 January – Bhawani Sankar Biswas, politician (b. 1918)
- 16 March – Khandaker Delwar Hossain, politician (b. 1933)
- 3 May – Ila Majumder, singer (b. 1941)
- 6 May – Kazi Nuruzzaman, war hero (b. 1925)
- 23 May – Pilu Momtaz, singer (b. 1953)
- 7 June – Mohammad Kibria, artist (b. 1929)
- 21 June – Kazi Zaker Husain, zoologist (b. 1930s)
- 13 August – Tareque Masud, film director (b. 1956)
- 13 August – Mishuk Munier, broadcast journalist (b. 1959)
- 10 October – Shah Muhammad Hasanuzzaman, agriculturist (b. 1920)
- 19 October – Munshi Siddique Ahmad, scientist (b. 1924)
- 7 November – Aminul Islam, artist (b. 1931)
- 13 November – Imdad Hossain, artist (b. 1926)
- 13 December – Kabir Chowdhury, educationist, author (b. 1923)
- 28 December – Razia Khan, poet (b. 1936)
- 30 December – Muhammad Hamidullah Khan, war hero (b. 1938)

== See also ==
- 2010s in Bangladesh
- List of Bangladeshi films of 2011
- 2011–12 Bangladeshi cricket season
- Timeline of Bangladeshi history
