= 2008 in Bangladesh =

- Centuries: 20th; 21st
- Decades: 1980s; 1990s; 2000s; 2010s; 2020s
- See also: Other events of 2008; List of years in Bangladesh

2008 (MMVIII) was a leap year starting on Tuesday of the Gregorian calendar, the 2008th year of the Common Era (CE) and Anno Domini (AD) designations, the 8th year of the 3rd millennium and the 21st century, and the 9th year of the 2000s decade.

The year 2008 was the 37th year after the independence of Bangladesh. It was also the second year of Bangladesh's caretaker Government led by Fakhruddin Ahmed.

== Incumbents ==
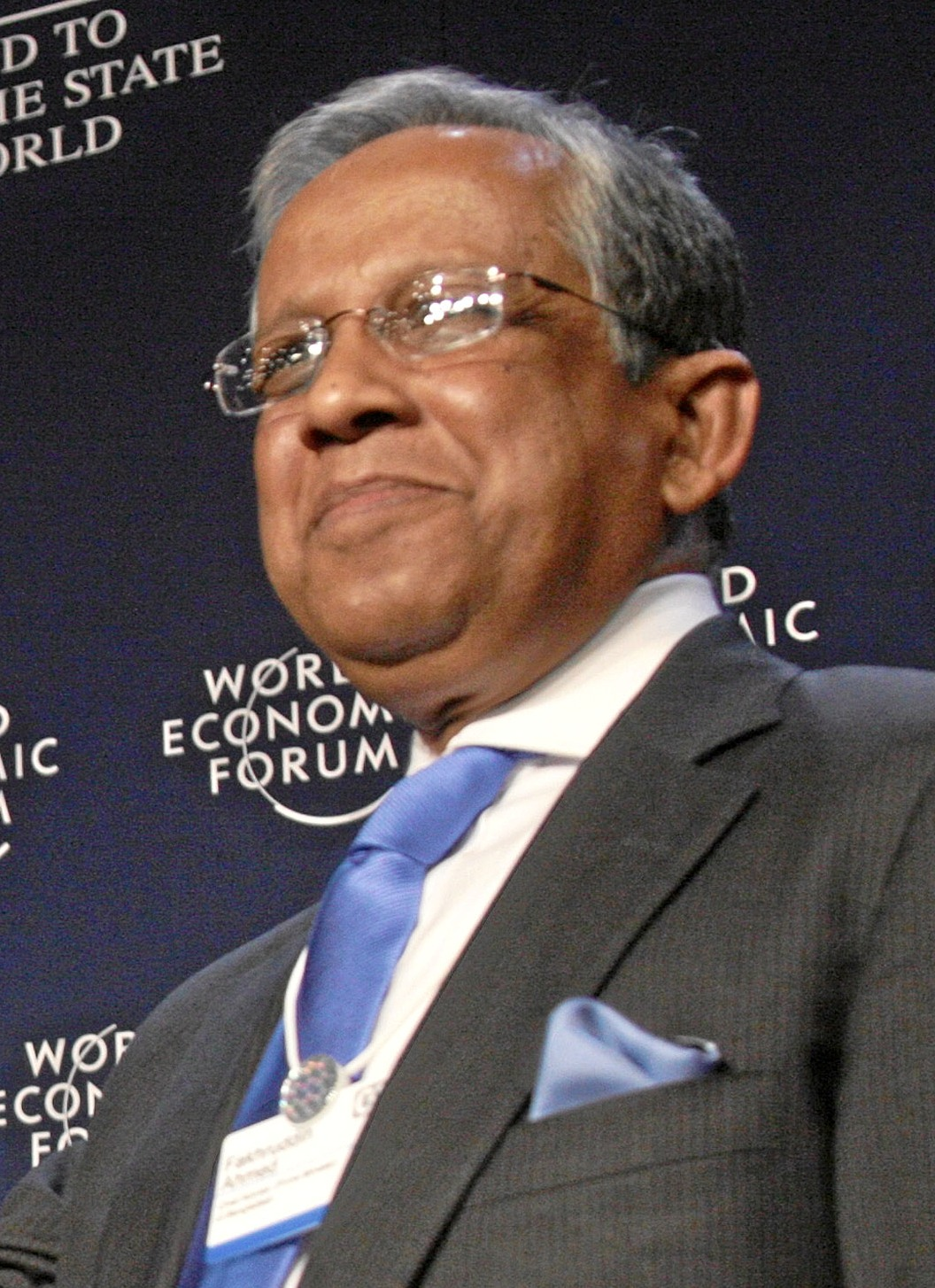
Fakhruddin
Ahmed

- President: Iajuddin Ahmed
- Prime Minister: Fakhruddin Ahmed (acting)
- Chief Justice: Md. Ruhul Amin

== Demography ==
Demographic Indicators for Bangladesh in 2008
Population, total	144,304,164
Population density (per km^{2})	1108.6
Population growth (annual %)	1.1%
Male to Female Ratio (every 100 Female)	104.0
Urban population (% of total)	29.0%
Birth rate, crude (per 1,000 people)	22.2
Death rate, crude (per 1,000 people)	5.9
Mortality rate, under 5 (per 1,000 live births)	55
Life expectancy at birth, total (years)	69.1
Fertility rate, total (births per woman)	2.4

== Climate ==
Climate data for Bangladesh in 2008
Month	Jan	Feb	Mar	Apr	May	Jun	Jul	Aug	Sep	Oct	Nov	Dec	Year
Daily mean °C (°F)	18.8 (65.8)	19.7 (67.5)	25.5 (77.9)	28.3 (82.9)	28.4 (83.1)	27.8 (82.0)	28.0 (82.4)	28.2 (82.8)	28.4 (83.1)	27.0 (80.6)	23.9 (75.0)	20.8 (69.4)	25.4 (77.7)
Average precipitation mm (inches)	21.6 (0.85)	14.5 (0.57)	19.7 (0.78)	84.9 (3.34)	188.9 (7.44)	405.8 (15.98)	509.1 (20.04)	274.9 (10.82)	200.5 (7.89)	151.3 (5.96)	3.9 (0.15)	1.8 (0.07)	1,876.9 (73.89)
Source: Climatic Research Unit (CRU) of University of East Anglia (UEA)

== Economy ==
Key Economic Indicators for Bangladesh in 2008
National Income
	Current US$	Current BDT	% of GDP
GDP	$91.6 billion	BDT6.3 trillion	
GDP growth (annual %)	6.0%		
GDP per capita	$635.0	BDT43,566	
Agriculture, value added	$16.1 billion	BDT1.1 trillion	17.6%
Industry, value added	$22.7 billion	BDT1.6 trillion	24.7%
Services, etc., value added	$48.5 billion	BDT3.3 trillion	52.9%
Balance of Payment
	Current US$	Current BDT	% of GDP
Current account balance	$0.9 billion		1.0%
Imports of goods and services	$25.2 billion	BDT1.6 trillion	25.0%
Exports of goods and services	$17,495.1 million	BDT1.1 trillion	17.7%
Foreign direct investment, net inflows	$1,328.4 million		1.4%
Personal remittances, received	$8,940.6 million		9.8%
Total reserves (includes gold) at year end	$5,787.4 million		
Total reserves in months of imports	2.6		

Note: For the year 2008 average official exchange rate for BDT was 68.60 per US$.

== Events ==
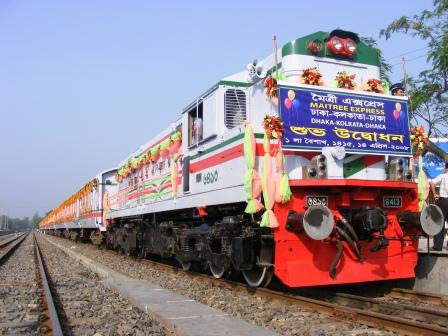
Inaugural Maitree Express train of the Bangladesh Railway on April 14, 2008, at Dhaka Cantonment.

- 3 February – The port city of Chittagong put on high alert to prevent a bird flu epidemic
- 8 February – A plague of rats destroy crops in Chattogram Hill Tracts
- 13 February – The immigration advisory service in Britain warn that restrictions on immigration of Bangladeshis to the UK was leading to shortages in curry houses and affecting the industry
- 28 February – Ferry accident near Dhaka claims 45 lives
- 3 March - Justice A. K. Badrul Haque resigned from High Court Division
- 14 April - Train service between Dhaka, Bangladesh and Kolkata, India, resumes after 43 years with the inauguration of Maitree Express
- 16 April - Train-bus collision in Tangail district kills at least 17 people and injures 19 others
- 13 May - Another ferry named MV Nazimuddin sunk in the Ghorautura River, killing at least 40 people
- 19 May- Dhaka high court approves citizenship for Biharis who were minors when Bangladesh won independence in 1971 or born after
- 11 June – Former PM Sheikh Hasina is released on parole
- 13 June – 9 bandits are killed in Natore by locals.
- 20 June – The Election Commission (EC) announces that polls to four city corporations and nine municipalities will be held on 4 August 2009.
- 30 June – The caretaker government increases prices of petroleum products for the second time during its tenure.
- 21 July – At least 21 people are killed and nearly 40 injured when two buses collide on a Bangladesh highway.
- 30 July – The government sets up a truth commission that would allow corrupt businessmen and politicians to avoid going to jail if they confess and refund money obtained illegally
- 3 September – Tareq Rahman, son of former PM Khaleda Zia is freed on bail.
- 11 September – Khaleda Zia is freed from her yearlong detention.
- 3 November – The caretaker government schedules general elections on 18 December 2008.
- 24 November – The Electoral Commission reschedules the date for the general election from 18 to 29 December.
- 29 December – 2008 Bangladeshi general election takes place, Bangladesh Awami League secures a landslide victory. Sheikh Hasina becomes PM for the second time.

=== Awards and Recognitions ===
==== Independence Day Award ====
Recipients	Area	Note
Dr. Syed Muhammad Shamsuzzoha	liberation war	
Dr. Govinda Chandra Dev	liberation war	
Rehman Sobhan	research and training	
Bangladesh Rifles	liberation war	organization

==== Ekushey Padak ====
1. Muzaffar Ahmed, education
2. Khandaker Nurul Alam, music
3. Shyam Sundar Baishnab, music (posthumous)
4. Najma Chowdhury, research
5. Shefali Ghosh, music (posthumous)
6. Waheedul Haq, music (posthumous)
7. Zohra Begum Kazi, social work (posthumous)
8. Dilwar Khan, literature
9. Khaleque Nawaz Khan, language

=== Sports ===
- Olympics:
  - Bangladesh sent a delegation to compete in the 2008 Summer Olympics in Beijing, China. Bangladesh did not win any medals in the competition.
- International football:
  - In June, Bangladesh participated in SAFF Championship held in Colombo, Sri Lanka. Bangladesh couldn't progress any further from the group stage.
  - In October, Bangladesh competed in Merdeka Tournament in Malaysia but couldn't register any point.
  - Later in November, Bangladesh participated in Myanmar Grand Royal Challenge Cup where they managed to secure a goalless draw against Myanmar, but again couldn't progress from the group stage.
- Domestic football:
  - Dhaka Abahani won Bangladesh League title.
- Cricket:
  - The South African cricket team toured Bangladesh for two Test matches and three One Day Internationals in February and March. The visitors swept both the series.
  - The Ireland cricket team toured Bangladesh in March 2008 and played three One Day Internationals (ODIs). Bangladesh won all three matches.
  - Bangladesh lost both first-round games against Pakistan and India at a triangular ODI tournament held in Bangladesh in June.
  - At the 2008 Asia Cup held in Pakistan, Bangladesh won their first group stage game against associate UAE. Even though they lost to Sri Lanka in the next group stage match, Bangladesh reached the super four stage, before losing the next three games against India, Sri Lanka and Pakistan.
  - The Bangladeshi national cricket team visited Pakistan in April and played a five-match Limited Overs International (LOI) series which Pakistan won 5–0.
  - In August–September, the Bangladesh national cricket team played three One Day International (ODI) matches in Australia. The Australians swept the series 3–0.
  - New Zealand played two Test matches and three One Day Internationals in Bangladesh in October, winning one Test and two ODIs. The other Test was drawn, and Bangladesh won the remaining ODI.
  - Then Bangladesh toured South Africa from 5 to 30 November. They played two Test matches, one Twenty20 International and three ODIs against South Africa. Other than an abandoned Test match South Africa won all other matches.
  - In December, however, Bangladesh bounced back from the previous lackluster performances by threatening to win the first Test match against Sri Lanka at home by chasing down the highest fourth innings total of 513. Though they fell 107 runs short, their performances were praised.

== Deaths ==
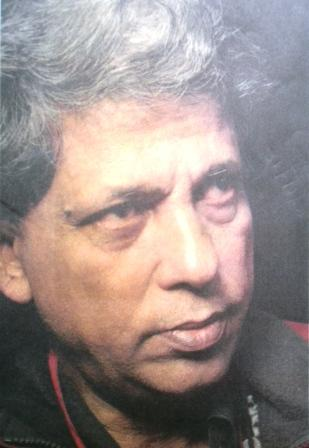
Selim Al Deen

- 14 January – Selim Al Deen, playwright (b. 1949)
- 31 January – Abdus Suttar Khan, scientist (b. 1941)
- 4 February – Devdas Chakraborty, artist (b. 1933)
- 16 February – Monwar Hossain Nannu, footballer (b.1948)
- 17 February – S M Aslam Talukder (Manna), movie actor (b. 1964)
- 26 February – Bazlur Rahman, journalist (b. 1941)
- 28 March – Mohammad Asaduzzaman, educator (b. 1948)
- 6 April – Naziur Rahman Manzur, politician (b. 1948)
- 21 August – Abdullah al Mamun, playwright, actor, filmmaker (b. 1942)
- 2 September – Mohammad Moniruzzaman, author (b. 1936)
- 2 September – Zia Haider, author (b. 1936)

== See also ==
- 2000s in Bangladesh
- List of Bangladeshi films of 2008
- Timeline of Bangladeshi history
