= 2013 in Bangladesh =

- Centuries: 20th; 21st
- Decades: 1990s; 2000s; 2010s; 2020s
- See also: Other events of 2013; List of years in Bangladesh

2013 (MMXIII) was a common year starting on Tuesday of the Gregorian calendar, the 2013th year of the Common Era (CE) and Anno Domini (AD) designations, the 13th year of the 3rd millennium and the 21st century, and the 4th year of the 2010s decade.

The year 2013 was the 42nd year after the independence of Bangladesh. It was also the fifth year of the second term of the government of Sheikh Hasina.

== Incumbents ==
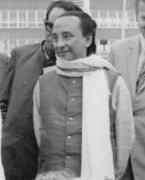
Zillur
Rahman

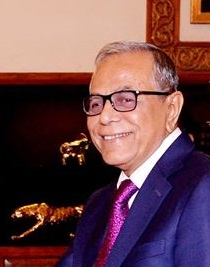
Abdul
Hamid

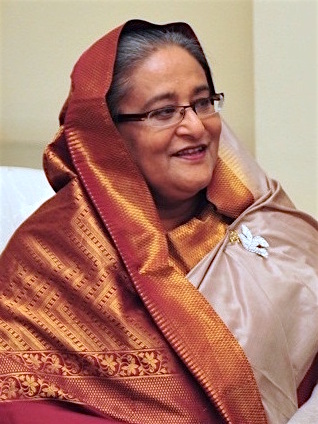
Sheikh
Hasina

- President: Zillur Rahman (till 20 March), Abdul Hamid (from 21 March)
- Prime Minister: Sheikh Hasina
- Chief Justice: Md. Muzammel Hossain

== Demography ==
Demographic Indicators for Bangladesh in 2013
Population, total	152,761,413
Population density (per km^{2})	1173.6
Population growth (annual %)	1.2%
Male to Female Ratio (every 100 Female)	103.0
Urban population (% of total)	32.8%
Birth rate, crude (per 1,000 people)	19.9
Death rate, crude (per 1,000 people)	5.6
Mortality rate, under 5 (per 1,000 live births)	42
Life expectancy at birth, total (years)	70.9
Fertility rate, total (births per woman)	2.2

== Climate ==
Climate data for Bangladesh in 2013
Month	Jan	Feb	Mar	Apr	May	Jun	Jul	Aug	Sep	Oct	Nov	Dec	Year
Daily mean °C (°F)	17.7 (63.9)	20.3 (68.5)	25.2 (77.4)	27.2 (81.0)	27.2 (81.0)	28.8 (83.8)	28.4 (83.1)	27.8 (82.0)	28.0 (82.4)	26.3 (79.3)	22.0 (71.6)	18.3 (64.9)	24.8 (76.6)
Average precipitation mm (inches)	1.0 (0.04)	11.5 (0.45)	8.6 (0.34)	112.0 (4.41)	276.5 (10.89)	347.2 (13.67)	459.0 (18.07)	423.6 (16.68)	219.7 (8.65)	254.1 (10.00)	0.7 (0.03)	0.9 (0.04)	2,114.8 (83.27)
Source: Climatic Research Unit (CRU) of University of East Anglia (UEA)

- The lowest temperature since Bangladesh's independence, at 37.4 °F (3.0 °C) was recorded in Saidpur on 10 January amid 2013 extreme weather events.

== Economy ==
Key Economic Indicators for Bangladesh in 2013
National Income
	Current US$	Current BDT	% of GDP
GDP	$150.0 billion	BDT12.0 trillion	
GDP growth (annual %)	6.0%		
GDP per capita	$981.9	BDT78,483	
Agriculture, value added	$23.2 billion	BDT1.9 trillion	15.5%
Industry, value added	$39.5 billion	BDT3.2 trillion	26.3%
Services, etc., value added	$80.1 billion	BDT6.4 trillion	53.4%
Balance of Payment
	Current US$	Current BDT	% of GDP
Current account balance	$2.1 billion		1.4%
Imports of goods and services	$41.6 billion	BDT3.2 trillion	26.8%
Exports of goods and services	$31,635.2 million	BDT2.3 trillion	19.5%
Foreign direct investment, net inflows	$2,603.0 million		1.7%
Personal remittances, received	$13,867.0 million		9.2%
Total reserves (includes gold) at year end	$18,087.7 million		
Total reserves in months of imports	4.9		

Note: For 2013, the average official exchange rate for BDT was 78.10 per US$.

== Events ==
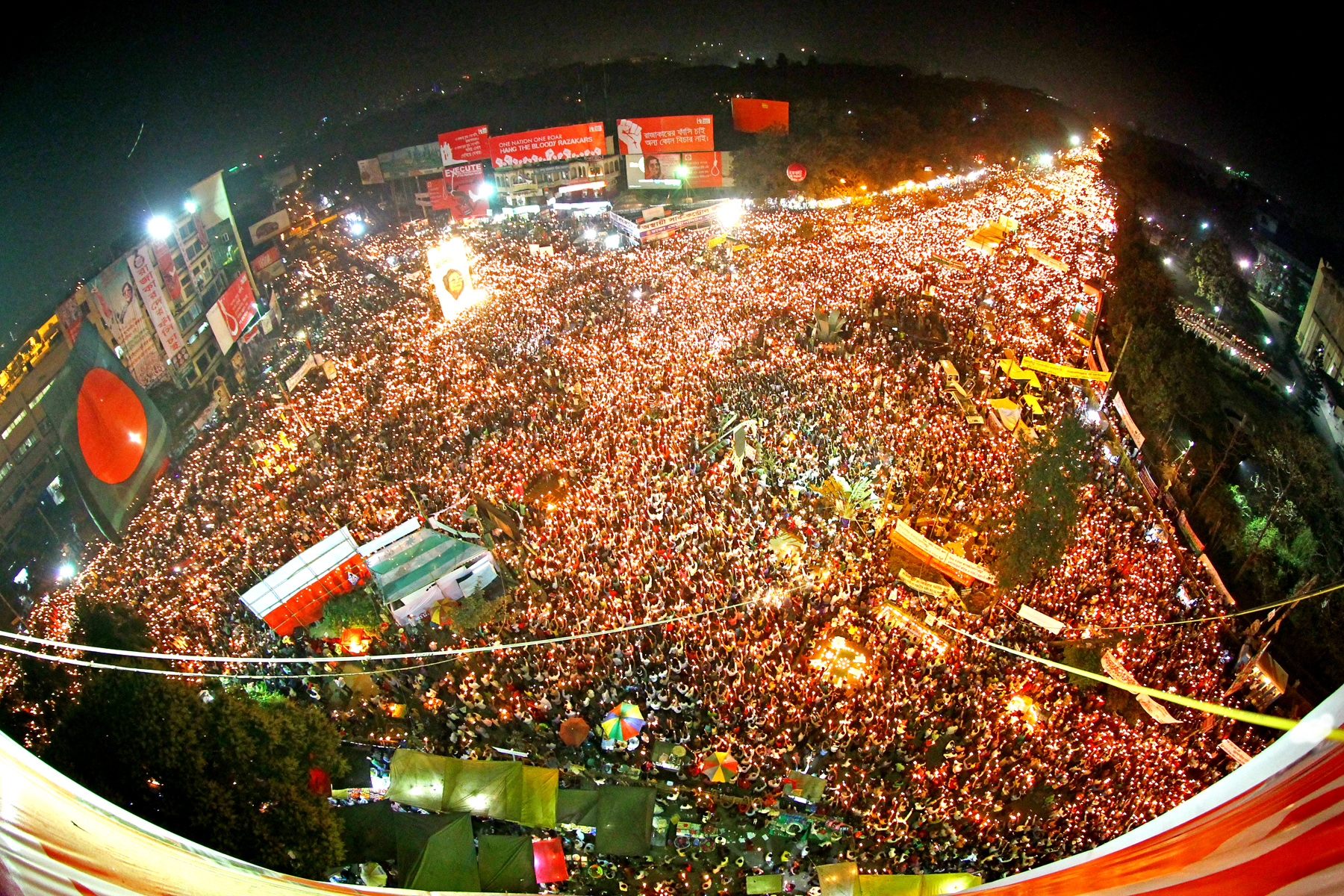
Demonstrators in Shahbag in February 2013

- 5 February – Protests break out in Shahbag, Dhaka, following demands for capital punishment for Abdul Quader Mollah, who had been sentenced to life imprisonment earlier that day, and for others convicted of war crimes by the International Crimes Tribunal of Bangladesh. Later demands included banning the Bangladesh Jamaat-e-Islami party from politics, including elections, and a boycott of institutions supporting (or affiliated with) the party.
- 15 February - Blogger Ahmed Rajib Haider is hacked to death by machete-wielding activists from a militant group named Ansarullah Bangla Team.
- 28 February - The International Crimes Tribunal sentences Delwar Hossain Sayeedi, the vice-president of the Jamaat-e-Islami, to death for war crimes committed during the 1971 Bangladesh Liberation War. Following the sentence, activists of Jamaat-e-Islami and its student wing, Islami Chhatra Shibir, attacked Hindus in different parts of the country. Hindu properties were looted, Hindu houses were burnt to ashes, and Hindu temples were desecrated and set on fire.
- 3 March - Bangladesh Jamaat-e-Islami enforces a 48-hour hartal. Protests led by Jamaate Islami activists and Sayeedi supporters were carried out during these strikes, during which members of the Border Guards Bangladesh and the Rapid Action Battalion (RAB) allegedly shot live ammunition and rubber bullets into unarmed crowds, which included children, conducted sweeping arrests and used other forms of excessive force during and after protests.
- 20 March - The incumbent president of the country, Zillur Rahman, dies at Mount Elizabeth Hospital in Singapore from a critical lung infection.
- 4 April - All Bengali blogs are blacked out for an indefinite time to protest the arrest of four bloggers in Bangladesh (Moshiur Rahman Biplob, Rasel Parvez, Subrata Adhikari Shuvo, and Asif Mohiuddin).
- 24 April - A structural failure triggers the collapse of an eight-story commercial building called Rana Plaza in the Savar Upazila of Dhaka District, which led to the death of 1,134 individuals - mostly garments workers. Approximately 2,500 injured people were rescued from the building alive. It is considered the deadliest structural failure accident in modern human history and also the deadliest garment factory disaster in history.
- 5 May - Mass protests and rioting take place at Shapla Square in the Motijheel area of capital Dhaka. The protests were organized by the Islamist pressure group, Hefazat-e Islam, who were demanding the enactment of a blasphemy law. The government responded to the protests by cracking down on the protesters using a combined force drawn from the police, Rapid Action Battalion, and paramilitary Border Guard Bangladesh to drive the protesters out of Shapla Square.
- 8 May - A fire kills 8 people in a garment factory.
- 15 May - The Accord on Fire and Building Safety in Bangladesh (the Accord) is signed. It is a five-year independent, legally binding agreement between global brands and retailers and trade unions designed to build a safe and healthy Bangladeshi Ready Made Garment (RMG) Industry.
- 10 July - hundreds of Bangladesh Civil Service examinees begin protests demanding an immediate cancellation of all sorts of quotas in public service recruitment. The protests continued for several days and turned into a nationwide movement against the quota system in Bangladesh Civil Service recruitment.
- 12 December - Convicted war criminal and Jamaat-e-Islami leader Abdul Quader Molla is hanged in Dhaka Central Jail.

=== Awards and recognitions ===
==== Independence Day Award ====
Recipients	Area	Note
Mohammad Shamsul Haque	liberation war	posthumous
Mohammad Mosharraf Hossain	liberation war	
Kazi Sazzad Ali	liberation war	
Abdul Hamid Miah	research on agriculture	
Swadesh Ranjan Bose	economics	posthumous
Satya Saha	culture	posthumous
M. A. Hannan	liberation war	posthumous
Abdul Hamid	liberation war	

==== Ekushey Padak ====
1. Rafiq Azad, language and literature
2. Asad Chowdhury, language and literature
3. Samson H. Chowdhury, social service (posthumous)
4. Udichi Shilpi Gosthi (arts)
5. Ajit Kumar Guha, Language Movement (posthumous)
6. Jamaluddin Hossain, arts
7. Mohammad Kamruzzaman, Language Movement (posthumous)
8. Kaderi Kibria, arts
9. Tofazzal Hossain, Language Movement
10. Nurjahan Murshid, social service (posthumous)
11. Bijoy Sarkar, arts (posthumous)
12. Enamul Haque Mostafa Shahid, Liberation War.
13. MA Wadud, Language Movement (posthumous)

=== Sports ===
- Football:
  - Bangladesh participated in the 2014 AFC Challenge Cup qualification (Group D) matches held in Nepal. They defeated the hosts as well as the Northern Mariana Islands, but they lost to Palestine and could not qualify for the next round.
  - Bangladesh later participated in the 2013 SAFF Championship, also held in Nepal, but in this competition they could not secure any victory.
- Cricket:
  - Bangladesh toured Sri Lanka from 3 to 31 March. The tour consisted of two Tests, three One Day Internationals (ODIs), and a Twenty20 International (T20I). Sri Lanka won the Test series 1–0, but the ODI series was drawn 1-1. Sri Lanka won the lone T20 match.
  - Bangladesh Cricket Board (BCB) president, Nazmul Hassan, stated on 30 May 2013 that a Bangladesh player was questioned by the ICC's Anti-Corruption and Security Unit (ACSU). He later confirmed the identity of the player as Mohammad Ashraful, the youngest centurion in test cricket. BCB decided "not to involve" former captain Mohammad Ashraful in any form of cricket until the ICC's ACSU submits its report.
  - Later, Bangladesh toured Zimbabwe from 17 April 2013 to 12 May 2013. The tour consisted of two Test matches, three One Day Internationals, and two Twenty20 International matches. The 2-match Test series and T20 series were drawn 1–1, while Zimbabwe won the 3-match ODI series 2–1.
  - The New Zealand cricket team toured Bangladesh in October and November. The tour consisted of two Test matches, three One Day Internationals, and one Twenty20 International. The matches were to be played in Chittagong and Mirpur. Both Test matches ended in draws, Bangladesh won all three One Day Internationals, and New Zealand won the sole Twenty20 International.
- Golf:
  - Bangladeshi golfer Siddikur Rahman won the Hero Indian Open as part of the 2013 Asian Tour.

== Deaths ==
- 15 January - Abdus Shakur, writer (b. 1941)
- 24 January - Nurul Islam, physician, national professor (b. 1928)
- 6 March - Abdul Jalil, politician (b. 1939)
- 16 March - Jamal Nazrul Islam, mathematical physicist (b. 1939)
- 20 March - Zillur Rahman, president of Bangladesh (b. 1929)
- 10 April - Binod Bihari Chowdhury, activist (b. 1911)
- 20 April - Amin Ahmed Chowdhury, war hero, diplomat (b. 1946)
- 1 July - Mita Noor, actor (b. 1971)
- 18 August - Nazim Uddin Mostan, journalist (b. 1948)
- 19 August - Abdur Rahman Boyati, folk singer, composer (b. 1939)
- 10 October - Dilwar Khan, poet (b. 1937)
- 23 October - S. M. Amzad Hossain, politician (b. 1927)
- 20 November - Rafiqul Islam, activist (b. 1950)
- 20 December - Khaled Khan, actor (b. 1958)

== See also ==
- 2010s in Bangladesh
- List of Bangladeshi films of 2013
- 2012–13 Bangladeshi cricket season
- 2013–14 Bangladeshi cricket season
- Timeline of Bangladeshi history
