= Mohammad Alam =

Mohammad Alam may refer to:

- Mohammad Alam (Afghan cricketer) (born 1996), Afghan cricketer
- Mohammad Alam (Pakistani cricketer) (born 1982), Pakistani cricketer
- Mohammad Alam (photojournalist) (died 2008), Bangladeshi photojournalist
- Mohammad Aadil Alam (born 2003), Nepalese cricketer
- Mohammad Izhar Alam (1948–2021), Indian police official
- Mohammad Sajjad Alam (1947–2022), Indian-born American particle physicist
- Mohammad Shafiul Alam (born 1959), Bangladeshi civil servant
- Muhammad Alam, sultan of Brunei
- Mohammad Aalam, character portrayed by Gaurav Gera in the 2025 Indian film Dhurandhar
- Mohamed Shah Alam (1962–1990), Bangladeshi Olympic sprinter (1988)
- Mohamed Mahbub Alam (1972–2010), Bangladeshi Olympic sprinter (2000)
