= Md. Joynul Abedin =

Bangladeshi judge

Md. Joynul Abedin Md. Joynul Abedin

Justice of the High Court Division of Bangladesh

Personal details
- Profession: Judge

Md. Joynul Abedin is a justice of the High Court Division of the Bangladesh Supreme Court

== Career ==
Joynul Abedin led a judicial commission, he was the only member, that investigated the 2004 Dhaka grenade attack targeting former prime minister Sheikh Hasina. His investigation found ties of a "foreign enemy" to the attack.

In August 2006, Joynul Abedin was promoted to the Appellate Division superseding A. K. Badrul Haque, Justice Syed Amirul Islam, and Justice Md. Hasan Amin which was protested by lawyers.

The Anti Corruption Commission began an investigation against Joynul Abedin and his wife in 2010. This started after Awami League assumed power in 2009.

Justice Abdul Wahhab Miah upheld the bail of Joynul Abedin in July 2017 which he secured after receiving a notice from the Anti Corruption Commission seeking his wealth statement. In November 2017, Justice M Enayetur Rahim and Justice Shahidul Karim cleared the way for the case to proceed against him saying Joynul Abedin did not enjoy immunity related to corruption charges. The commission sent a Mutual Legal Assistance Request to the United States requesting information on Joynul Abedin. According to the commission he allegedly made 3.5 million BDT through corruption. It filed charges against him and his wife.

In February 2022, the Anti Corruption Commission pressed charges against him and Faisal Abedin, his son, for possessing "illegal wealth". The commission stated Joynul Abedin hid 325 thousand taka and his wife his 439 thousand taka.
