= 2007 in Bangladesh =

- Centuries: 20th; 21st
- Decades: 1980s; 1990s; 2000s; 2010s; 2020s
- See also: Other events of 2007; List of years in Bangladesh

2007 (MMVII) was a common year starting on Monday of the Gregorian calendar, the 2007th year of the Common Era (CE) and Anno Domini (AD) designations, the 7th year of the 3rd millennium and the 21st century, and the 8th year of the 2000s decade.

The year 2007 was the 36th year after the independence of Bangladesh. It was also the first year of the regime of the fourth caretaker Government led by Fakhruddin Ahmed.

== Incumbents ==
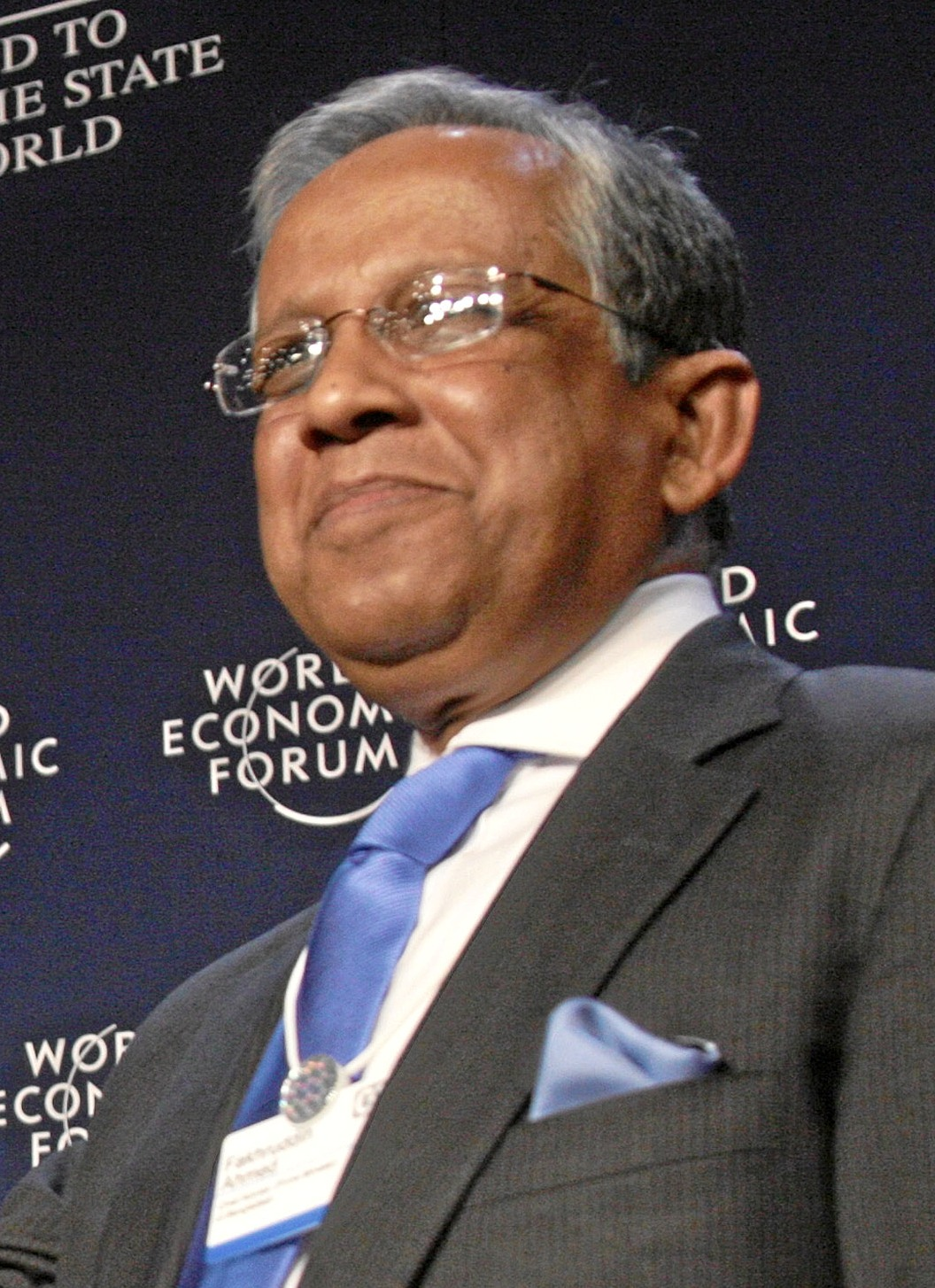
Fakhruddin
Ahmed

- President: Iajuddin Ahmed
- Chief Advisor:
  - until 11 January: Iajuddin Ahmed
  - 11 January-12 January: Fazlul Haque
  - starting 6 January: Fakhruddin Ahmed (acting)
- Chief Justice: Syed Jillur Rahim Mudasser Husain (until 28 February), Md. Ruhul Amin (starting 1 March)

== Demography ==
Demographic Indicators for Bangladesh in 2007
Population, total	142,660,381
Population density (per km^{2})	1096.0
Population growth (annual %)	1.2%
Male to Female Ratio (every 100 Female)	104.4
Urban population (% of total)	28.2%
Birth rate, crude (per 1,000 people)	22.7
Death rate, crude (per 1,000 people)	6.0
Mortality rate, under 5 (per 1,000 live births)	58
Life expectancy at birth, total (years)	68.6
Fertility rate, total (births per woman)	2.5

== Climate ==
Climate data for Bangladesh in 2007
Month	Jan	Feb	Mar	Apr	May	Jun	Jul	Aug	Sep	Oct	Nov	Dec	Year
Daily mean °C (°F)	18.7 (65.7)	20.6 (69.1)	24.7 (76.5)	27.9 (82.2)	28.6 (83.5)	28.5 (83.3)	28.0 (82.4)	28.7 (83.7)	28.3 (82.9)	27.3 (81.1)	23.8 (74.8)	19.7 (67.5)	25.4 (77.7)
Average precipitation mm (inches)	1.4 (0.06)	41.6 (1.64)	12.2 (0.48)	320.8 (12.63)	181.5 (7.15)	448.8 (17.67)	526.9 (20.74)	835.0 (32.87)	325.6 (12.82)	179.2 (7.06)	26.4 (1.04)	0.9 (0.04)	2,900.3 (114.2)
Source: Climatic Research Unit (CRU) of University of East Anglia (UEA)

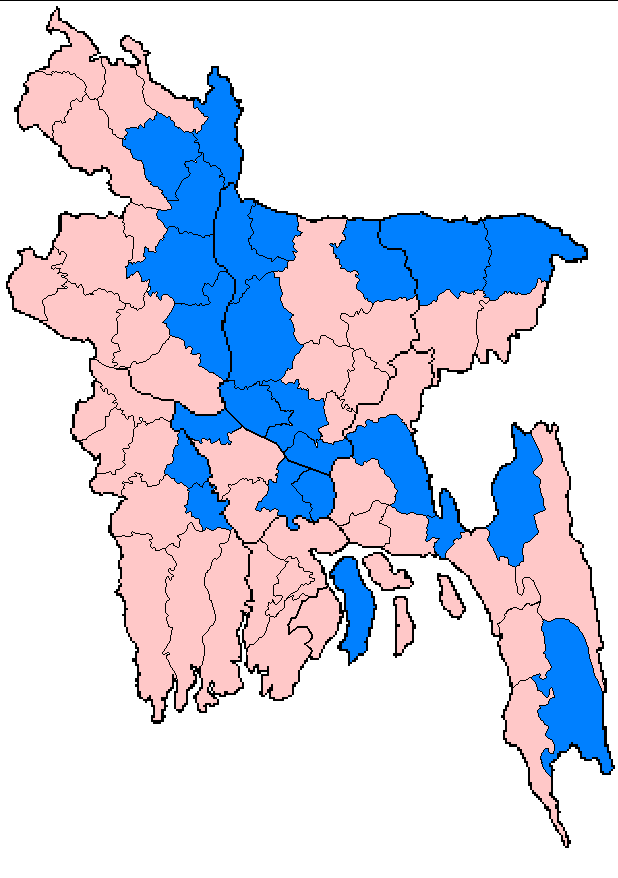
Districts of Bangladesh affected by flooding between 3 July and 15 August 2007 (marked in blue).

=== Flood ===
In 2007, a series of floods impacted South Asia including Bangladesh. On 1 August, there was flooding on the Padma and Brahmaputra rivers. By 3 August, the main highway connecting Dhaka to the rest of the country was impassable, many districts were flood-affected and 500,000 people had been marooned. By 7 August, an estimated 7.5 million people had fled their homes. By 8 August, more than 50,000 people had diarrhoea or other waterborne diseases and more than 400,000 people were in temporary shelters.

As of 21 July, the flood impacted districts included Dhaka, Munshiganj, Rajbari, Madaripur, Shariatpur, Manikganj, Netrakona, Jamalpur and Tangail in Dhaka division; Magura and Narail in Khulna division; Sirajganj, Rangpur, Gaibandha, Bogra and Kurigram in Rajshahi division and Sylhet, Sunamganj and Sherpur in Sylhet division. By 11 August, flood deaths were still occurring in Bangladesh, the number of people with flood-related diseases was increasing and about 100,000 people had caught dysentery or diarrhoea. By 13 August, the confirmed death toll in Bangladesh was 405. By 15 August, five million people were still displaced, the estimated death toll was nearly 500, and all six of Bangladesh's divisions were affected.

=== Cyclone ===
An extremely severe tropical cyclone, named Cyclone Sidr resulted in one of the worst natural disasters in Bangladesh this year. Sidr formed in the central Bay of Bengal, and quickly strengthened to reach peak 1-minute sustained winds of 260 km/h (160 mph), making it a Category-5 equivalent tropical cyclone on the Saffir-Simpson Scale. The storm eventually made landfall in Bangladesh on November 15, 2007, causing large-scale evacuations. At least 3,447 deaths have been blamed on the storm, with some estimates reaching 15,000.

Save the Children estimated the number of deaths associated with the cyclone to be between 3,100 and 10,000, while the Red Crescent Society reported on November 18 that the number of deaths could be up to 15,000. Other aid agencies have estimated a death toll of up to 15,000. International groups pledged US$95 million to repair the damage, which was estimated at $1.7 billion (2007 USD).

Cyclone Sidr making landfall in Bangladesh.

Coastal districts of Bangladesh faced heavy rainfall as an early impact of the cyclone. Dhaka and other parts of Bangladesh experienced drizzle and gusty winds. Total damages came close to $450 million. The damage was extensive, including tin shacks flattened, houses and schools blown away and enormous tree damages. Some local officials have described the damage as being even worse than that from the 1991 cyclone. The entire cities of Patuakhali, Barguna and Jhalokati District were hit hard by the storm surge of over 5 meters (16 ft). About a quarter of the world heritage site Sunderbans were damaged. Researchers said mangrove forest Sunderban will take at least 40 years to recover itself from this catastrophe. Much of the capital city of Dhaka was also severely affected, as electricity and water service were cut and significant damage was reported there due to winds and flooding. The local agricultural industry was also devastated, as many rice crops — which have a December harvest — were lost.

At least 3,447 deaths have been reported. Highest estimated death toll is around 15,000. The hardest-hit area was Barguna, where 423 people were reported to have been killed, according to local officials. Patuakhali was also hard-hit, with 385 deaths reported. Most of the deaths confirmed thus far were due to the winds, although 13 of them have been as a result of capsized boats in the Faridpur district of Bangladesh. The head of the Red Crescent in Bangladesh expected the death toll to reach as high as 15,000. Over 3,000 other fishermen were reported missing on over 500 fishing boats. The maximum estimated death toll from Sidr in the densely populated region is over 15,000.

== Economy ==
Key Economic Indicators for Bangladesh in 2007
National Income
	Current US$	Current BDT	% of GDP
GDP	$79.6 billion	BDT5.5 trillion	
GDP growth (annual %)	7.1%		
GDP per capita	$558.1	BDT38,539	
Agriculture, value added	$14.2 billion	BDT1.0 trillion	17.8%
Industry, value added	$19.5 billion	BDT1.3 trillion	24.5%
Services, etc., value added	$42.1 billion	BDT2.9 trillion	52.9%
Balance of Payment
	Current US$	Current BDT	% of GDP
Current account balance	$0.9 billion		1.1%
Imports of goods and services	$19.6 billion	BDT1.3 trillion	22.9%
Exports of goods and services	$14,090.3 million	BDT0.9 trillion	17.0%
Foreign direct investment, net inflows	$651.0 million		0.8%
Personal remittances, received	$6,562.3 million		8.2%
Total reserves (includes gold) at year end	$5,277.5 million		
Total reserves in months of imports	3		

Note: For the year 2007 average official exchange rate for BDT was 68.87 per US$.

== Events ==
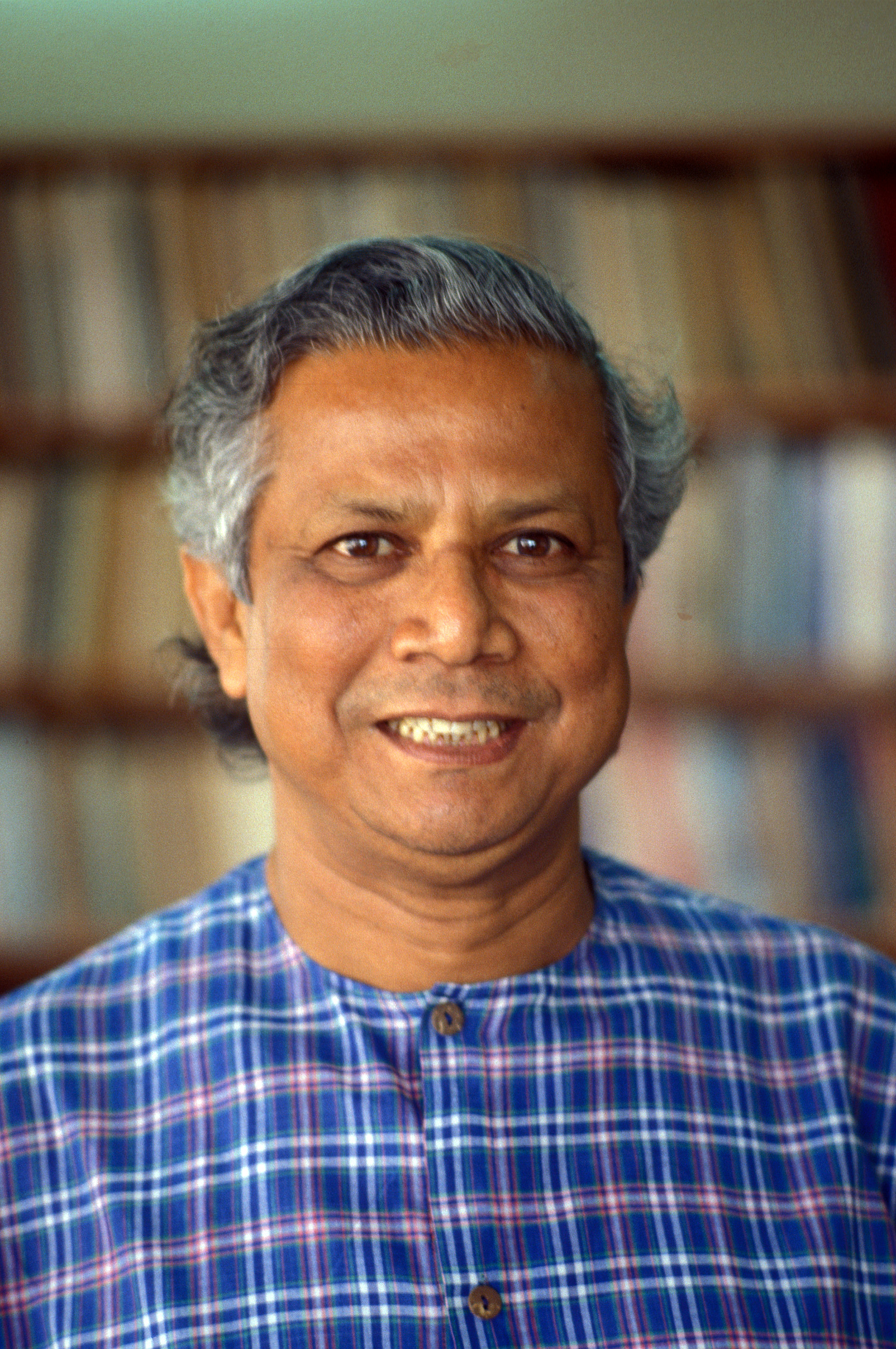
Muhammad Yunus

- January 6 - Over 40 people are killed in a bus crash in Suwagazi, Comilla District.
- January 11 - President Iajuddin Ahmed declares a state of emergency.
- January 12 - Fakhruddin Ahmed takes oath as the Chief Adviser of the caretaker government.
- February 22 - Muhammad Yunus, a nobel prize winner, announces the formation of a new political party.
- March 7 - Tarique Rahman, older son of Zia and Senior Joint Secretary-General of BNP is arrested on corruption charges.
- March 17: Bangladesh national cricket team defeats favorites India national cricket team at the 2007 Cricket World Cup, pulling the biggest upset of the tournament.
- March 30 - Leaders of the terrorist group JMJB are executed ending a series of terrorist events that had begun in 2005. Among the executed were top leaders were Shaykh Abdur Rahman, Siddique ul-Islam and others.
- April 16 - Arafat Rahman Koko, younger son of Zia is arrested on charge of money laundering.
- May 03: Nobel laureate Professor Muhammad Yunus backs down from forming a political party.
- June 11: Monsoon rain causes mudslide in Chittagong killing at least 128 people.
- June 30: Former President H M Ershad quits the post of Chairman of Jatiya Party.
- July 15: Bangladesh police detains former Prime Minister Sheikh Hasina on corruption charges.
- July 23: Biman Bangladesh Airlines turns into a Public Limited Company.
- July 30: Dhaka High Court suspends the extortion trial of Sheikh Hasina under emergency rule.
- August 07: Bangabandhu murder case hearing resumes after 6 years.
- August 20: Bangladesh seeks emergency flood aid. (REUTERS)
- August 21: Five thousand Dhaka University students riot, resulting in major disruption to the university with 150 students being injured. (USA Today)
- August 22: Bangladesh imposes curfew in six cities. (WSJ)
- August 24: Bangladesh suspends indefinite curfew for 14 hours.
- August 26: Dhaka rejects Delhi's claim of Bangladesh link with 25 August 2007 Hyderabad bombings, describing them as 'baseless'. (Daily Star)
- August 28: Bangladesh lifts curfew in major cities.
- September 3: The military-backed interim government in Bangladesh arrested former PM Khaleda Zia on charges of extortion and corruption. (BBC)
- September 9: Fakhruddin Ahmed addresses the nation and recalls indoor politics with strict conditions in preparation for next general election. (Daily Star)
- September 12: Government evacuated coastal areas after a weather forecast for a possible Tsunami. (Daily Star)
- October 08: The Government fines Grameenphone USD 24.5 million for illegal use of Voice Over Internet Protocol (VoIP). (AFP)
- October 12: Banglalink pays US$18.5 million VoIP fine. (TeleGeography)
- October 13: 4 killed, over 50 injured when rear carriages of Probhati Express derails near Dhaka, Bangladesh
- November 01: Bangladesh formally declares its judiciary free from executive control. (REUTERS)
- November 10: Bangladesh joins Trans-Asian Railway Network Agreement. (xinhua)
- November 12: Aktel gets fined US$21 million for illegal VoIP trade. (Daily Star)
- November 16: Cyclone Sidr with wind speed up to 260 km/h strikes Bangladesh, leaving at highest estimate 15,000 people dead. It is one of the deadliest tropical cyclone in history.
- December 9: At least four workers were killed and about 50 others were injured when the roof of a 22-storey building (Rangs Bhaban) collapsed as it was being demolished in the Bangladeshi capital Dhaka. (Daily Star)
- December 10 - The remaining of Bir Sreshtho Hamidur Rahman is bought back to Bangladesh.
- December 16: Victory Day observed, nation demanded trial of war criminals. (reuters)
- December 26: The adviser to Bangladesh's interim government for education and cultural affairs, Ayub Quadri, resigns amid an inquiry into the theft of two rare archaeological artifacts. (reuters)

=== Award and recognition ===
==== International recognition ====
- Grameen Shakti was awarded the Right Livelihood Award.
- On July 25, Muhammad Yunus was honoured as an adviser to the government of Hainan province of China.
- Bangladeshi software engineer Nafees Bin Zafar received Academy Scientific and Technical Award in 2007 for his contribution to the development of the fluid simulation system for the movie Pirates of the Caribbean: At World's End.

==== Independence Day Award ====
- Bangladesh Army and BRAC were awarded for their role in the war of liberation and social work (respectively).

==== Ekushey Padak ====
1. M A Beg, photography (posthumous)
2. Selim Al Deen, drama
3. Mohammad Mahfuzullah, literature
4. Anwar Pervez, music (posthumous)
5. Muhammad Habibur Rahman, literature

=== Sports ===
- Asian Indoor Games:
  - Bangladesh national kabaddi team won Bronze in the tournament held at Macau
- Football:
  - The 2008 AFC Challenge Cup qualification was held between 2 April and 8 May in India. Bangladesh drew with Afghanistan, but lost to Kyrgyzstan in the group stage and failed to move to the next round.
  - Bangladesh also played in the Nehru Cup held in India in August. In this tournament they managed to defeat Cambodia, but lost to Kyrgyzstan, India and Syria.
  - Dhaka Abahani won National Football Championship while Dhaka Mohammedan became runner-up.
- Cricket:

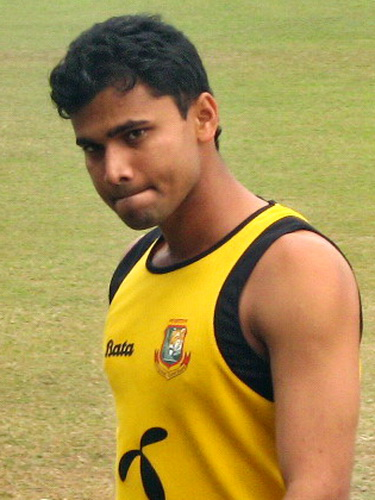
Mashrafe Mortaza

  - The Bangladeshi cricket team played a 4-match ODI series in Zimbabwe from 4 to 10 February 2007. They won the series 3–1.
  - Then Bangladesh participated in 2007 Cricket World Cup in the West Indies from 13 March to 28 April. In the group stage, Bangladesh caused a huge upset by defeating India by 5 wickets and managing to move to the next round ahead of them as the second team in the group following the group Champion Sri Lanka. Mashrafe Mortaza was the player of the match in the match against India in which he took 4 wickets. In the super 8 stages, Bangladesh caused another upset by defeating South Africa by 67 runs.
  - After the world cup the Indian cricket team toured Bangladesh for two Test matches and three One Day Internationals in May 2007. India team won all matches except one rain-interrupted abandoned ODI and one rain impacted drawn test match.
  - Then Bangladesh toured Sri Lanka for three Test matches and three One Day Internationals in June and July 2007. This series held Mohammad Ashraful's first Test and ODI matches as captain of Bangladesh. Sri Lanka ended up winning all the Test matches and One-day Internationals.
  - Later Bangladesh toured New Zealand between 19 December 2007 and 16 January 2008 to play three one day internationals (ODIs) and two Test matches. New Zealand whitewashed both the ODI and Test series.
- Chess:
  - Grandmaster Abdullah Al Rakib earned his GM title.

== See also ==
- 2000s in Bangladesh
- List of Bangladeshi films of 2007
- Timeline of Bangladeshi history

== Death ==
- February 4: Mohammad Sharif Husain, educationist and activist in the Bengali language movement (b. 1934)
- February 8: Kazi Anowar Hossain, painter (b. 1941)
- March 9: Rosy Afsari, actor (b. 1946)
- March 16: Manjural Islam Rana, cricketer (b. 1984)
- July 24: Abdul Karim, historian (b. 1928)
- September 9: A S H K Sadek, politician (b. 1934)
- October 6: Ubaidul Haq, khatib of national mosque (b. 1928)
- October 13: Obaidul Huq, journalist and writer (b. 1911)
- November 10: Black Anwar, actor (b. 1941)
- November 19: Sanjeeb Choudhury, journalist and singer (b. 1964)
- December 23: Mahbub Ul Alam Choudhury, poet, journalist, and activist in the Bengali language movement (b. 1927)
