= Md. Hasan Amin =

Bangladeshi judge

Justice of the High Court Division of Bangladesh

Personal details
- Profession: Judge

Md. Hasan Amin is a former judge of the High Court Division of the Bangladesh Supreme Court.

== Early life ==
Amin was born on 3 July 1941 in Chapainawabganj District, East Bengal, British Raj.

== Career ==
Amin was appointed an additional judge of the High Court Division on 1 June 1996. He was made a permanent judge of the High Court Division on 31 June 1998. He precided over the Secretary, Ministry of Finance v. Masdar Hossain in the High Court Division in which he declared Judges are not employees of the government they are responsible for exercising sovereign judicial powers.

Justice Md. Joynul Abedin was promoted superseding Amin, Justice Syed Amirul Islam, and Justice A. K. Badrul Haque which was protested by lawyers in August 2006.

In August 2007, Amin sent an appeal against the demolition of Rangs Bhaban to a full Appellate Division bench led by Chief justice Md Ruhul Amin. The Caretaker government of Bangladesh sought to demolish the 22 floor Rangs Bhaban to build the Bijoy Sarani-Tejgaon Link road.
