= 2010s in Bangladesh =

The 2010s was a decade of the Gregorian calendar that began on 1 January 2010 and ended on 31 December 2019. For Bangladesh, this decade was characterized by political stability from the continued rule of the Sheikh Hasina-led Awami League government. While the country made significant economic growth in this decade, rising threats from Islamist terrorism and the Rohingya refugee problem marred the progress.

== Politics and national life ==
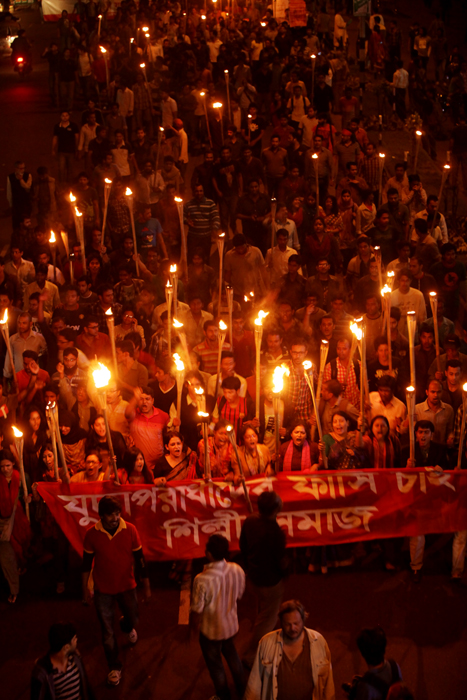
2013 Shahbag protests demanding the death penalty for the war criminals of the 1971 Bangladesh Liberation War

The decade began with the Awami League government in power. The infamous BDR Mutiny had just been subdued, and the trial of war crimes committed during the Bangladesh Liberation War had begun. In 2010, the Supreme Court of Bangladesh reaffirmed secularism as a fundamental principle in the constitution. The war crimes tribunal mobilised public opinion in favour of secularism, which was manifested in the March 2013 Shahbag protests. In response, a huge Islamist mobilisation also took place, led by the Hefazat-e-Islam group in May 2013.

The intense bickering between the League and BNP, often dubbed the Battle of the Begums, continued. The Hasina government abolished the provision of a caretaker government in the constitution through the controversial Fifteenth Amendment. The move was seen by the BNP as an attempt to corrupt the election process in favour of the League.

In 2013, the hard-line, right-wing, Islamic party, Jamaat-e-Islami, was banned from registering and therefore contesting in elections by the High Court, citing their charter violates the constitution. Street violence between the League, BNP, and the Jamaat intensified in the run-up to the general election. In 2014, the general elections were boycotted by the BNP. The elections were criticized by the United States, United Kingdom, European Union, and the United Nations. Sheikh Hasina was sworn in for a third tenure as prime minister.

In 2015 and 2016, Bangladesh saw increasing assassinations targeting minorities and secularists, including Hindus, Buddhists, Christians, Western and Asian expatriates, LGBT activists, Sufi Muslims, bloggers, publishers, and atheists. The country's worst terrorist attack saw the death of 20 people after an upmarket restaurant was sieged by gunmen in July 2016. The Islamic State of Iraq and Levant has claimed responsibility for many of the attacks, although the Hasina government insists local terror outfits are more likely to be responsible. Since this attack, the government took stricter measures against extremists as the security forces led numerous raids on suspected militant hideouts. The measures led to a reduction in extremist attacks and fatalities.

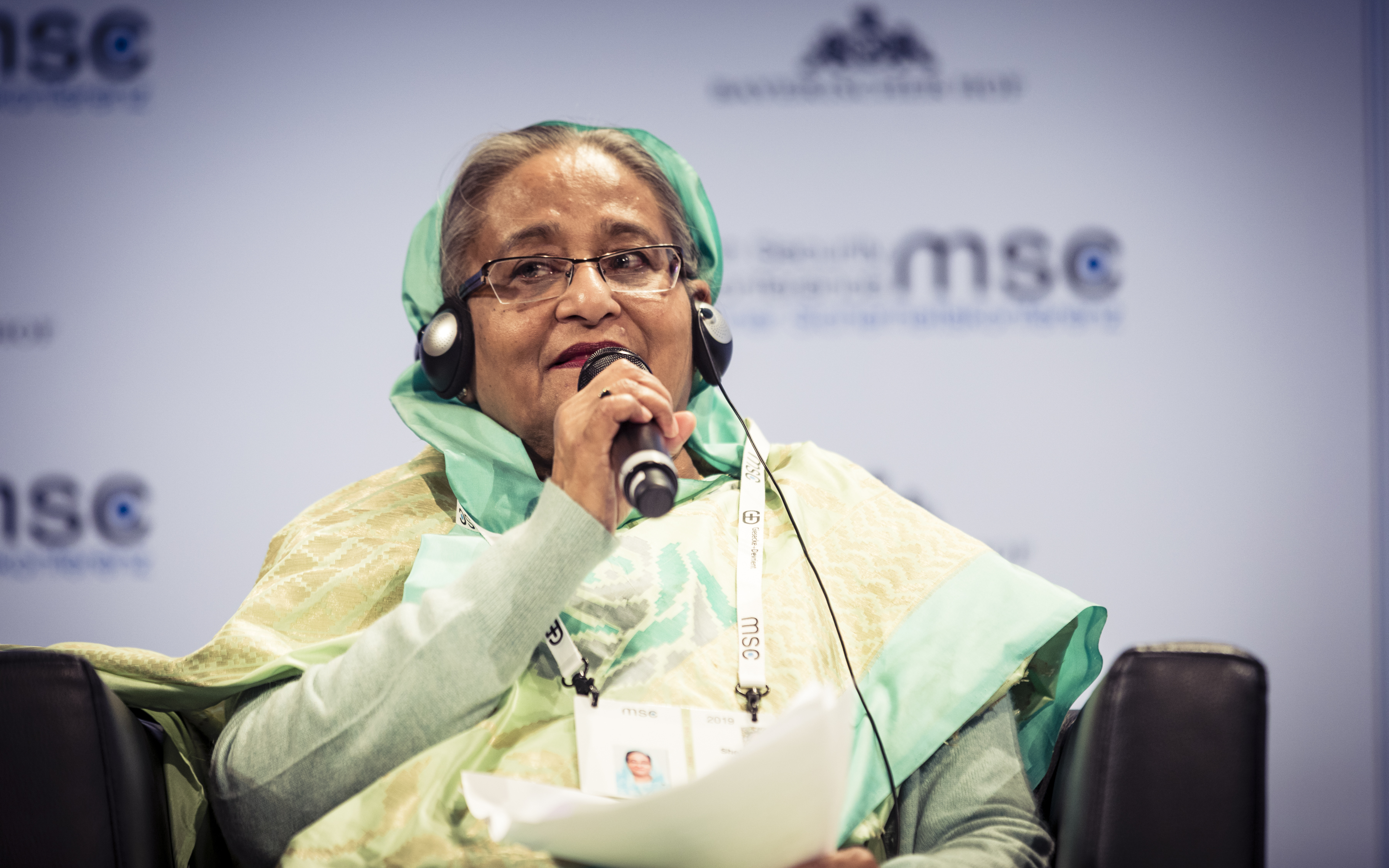
Sheikh Hasina during the Munich Security Conference 2019

In 2017 the country faced a fresh challenge from incoming Rohingya refugees. Starting in early August 2017, the Myanmar security forces began "clearance operations" against the Rohingya in northern Rakhine state — killing thousands of Rohingya, brutalizing thousands more, and driving hundreds of thousands out of the country into neighboring Bangladesh. In the first four weeks of the conflict, over 400,000 Rohingya refugees (approximately 40% of the remaining Rohingya in Myanmar) fled the country on foot or by boat (chiefly to Bangladesh), creating a major humanitarian crisis. The governments of Myanmar and Bangladesh signed a memorandum of understanding on 23 November 2017 regarding the repatriation of Rohingya refugees to Rakhine State. However, till the end of the decade, over 740,000 refugees remained in Bangladesh creating pressure on the country's economy and infrastructure.

The 2018 general election brought another landslide victory for the Awami League led by Sheikh Hasina. While the opposition was already weak due to key leaders being in either jail or exile, the elections were further marred by violence and claims of vote rigging. However, this gave the Awami League government stability and the opportunity to complete key infrastructure projects for the country, including the Padma Bridge and the Dhaka Metro Rail.

== Administrative division ==
Divisions of Bangladesh by the end of the 2010s

With the introduction of Rangpur Division in 2010 and Mymensingh Division in 2015, by the end of the decade the country was divided into eight divisions shown in the table below:

Administrative Divisions of Bangladesh in the 2010s
Division	Capital	Established	Area (km^{2})	2016 Population	Density	# of Districts
Barisal Division	Barisal	1 January 1993	13,225	9,145,000	691	6
Chittagong Division	Chittagong	1 January 1829	33,909	31,980,000	943	11
Dhaka Division	Dhaka	1 January 1829	20,594	40,171,000	1,951	13
Khulna Division	Khulna	1 October 1960	22,284	17,252,000	774	10
Mymensingh Division	Mymensingh	14 September 2015	10,584	12,368,000	1,169	4
Rajshahi Division	Rajshahi	1 January 1829	18,153	20,412,000	1,124	8
Rangpur Division	Rangpur	25 January 2010	16,185	17,602,000	1,088	8
Sylhet Division	Sylhet	1 August 1995	12,635	11,291,000	894	4

As shown in the table above, these divisions were further subdivided into 64 districts.

== Demographics ==
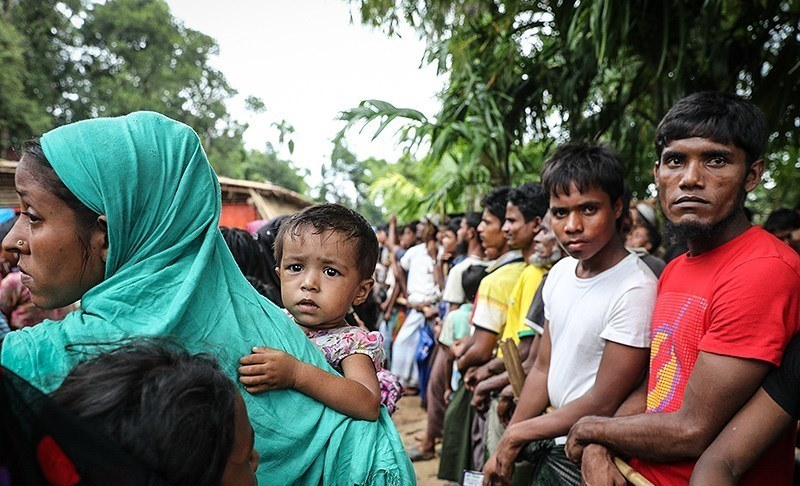
Rohingya refugees in Bangladesh in October 2017

Based on World Development Indicators published by the World Bank, the population of Bangladesh grew from 150 million at the beginning of the decade to 161 million by the end. This signifies an annual population growth rate of 0.7%. Population density increased from 1156 to 1240 per km^{2}. The urban population was 30.5% of the total at the beginning, which ended up at 36.6%. Dhaka, the largest city, with a population of 14.7 million, accounted for 31.8% of the total urban population by 2019. The age dependency ratio (% of working-age population) changed from 58.2% to 49.0% by the end of the decade.

The influx of Rohingya refugees had an impact on the demography of Bangladesh. From 25 August to 25 October 2017, around 605,000 Rohingyas arrived in Cox's Bazar. Besides, almost 203,431 Rohingya refugees were already living at Ukhiya and Teknaf Upazila of Cox's Bazar, and they had come there during the period from July 2005 to August 2017. The total number of Rohingya refugees staying in Bangladesh by the end of the decade was about 1,008,431.

== Climate ==
The lowest temperature since Bangladesh's independence, at 37.4 °F (3.0 °C) was recorded in Saidpur on 10 January 2013.

=== Natural disasters ===
An animation depicting Roanu nearing landfall over Bangladesh.

In 2012, floods and landslides caused by heavy rain in late June, significantly affected ten districts in the country's northern and south-eastern parts, causing 131 deaths. In August–September 2014, continuous rainfall in north and north-eastern Bangladesh caused flash floods in low-lying and densely populated areas, affecting 2.8 million people. On 21 May 2016, Cyclone Roanu made landfall near Chittagong, Bangladesh. 30 people died when this cyclone hit the county, and around 40,000 homesteads and business houses were damaged.

In 2017, Cyclone Mora made landfall on 31 May. Strong winds and storm surge battered buildings and destroyed farmlands across Chittagong, Cox's Bazar, and Rangamati. At least 20,000 houses were damaged in refugee camps for Rohingya Muslims, who were displaced by conflict in neighbouring Myanmar. Continued monsoon rain later in the year caused flooding that covered approximately one-third of Bangladesh, primarily in the northern, north-eastern, and central parts of the country. Over six million have been affected, according to UNICEF, with estimates ranging as high as 8.5 million. Property losses included nearly 700,000 damaged or destroyed homes, 4,680,000 hectares (11,600,000 acres) of farmland inundated, and thousands of miles of damaged roads. On 12 June, heavy monsoon rain triggered a series of landslides and floods in Rangamati, Chittagong, and Bandarban - three hilly districts of Bangladesh - and killed at least 152 people.

== Awards and recognitions ==
- A.H.M. Noman Khan, a community leader promoting the cause of disabled people, was awarded the Ramon Magsaysay Award in 2010.
- Fazle Hasan Abed, founder of BRAC, was awarded Honorary Knighthood by Queen Elizabeth II in 2010.
- Muhammad Yunus, founder of Grameen Bank, was presented with a Congressional Gold Medal awarded by the United States Congress in 2010.
- Syeda Rizwana Hasan, a lawyer promoting environmental protection, was awarded the Ramon Magsaysay Award in 2012.
- Sir Fazle Hasan Abed, founder of BRAC, wins the World Food Prize in 2015.

== Culture ==
=== Literature ===
The country's most popular author of the time, Humayun Ahmed, died in 2012. His unexpected and untimely death was mourned widely, and it created an "emotionally unifying experience" for the nation. In 2016 the country further lost another leading critically acclaimed poet and author, Syed Shamsul Haque. These two deaths created a vacuum in the literary field of Bangladesh. Some of the notable literary works from this decade include: Abdullah Abu Sayeed's Amar Boka Shoishob, Muntassir Mamoon's Dusshomoyer Dinguli, Humayun Ahmed's Badshah Namdar, Tahmima Anam's The Good Muslim, and Imdadul Haq Milan's Ekattor O Ekjon Maa.

=== Visual arts ===
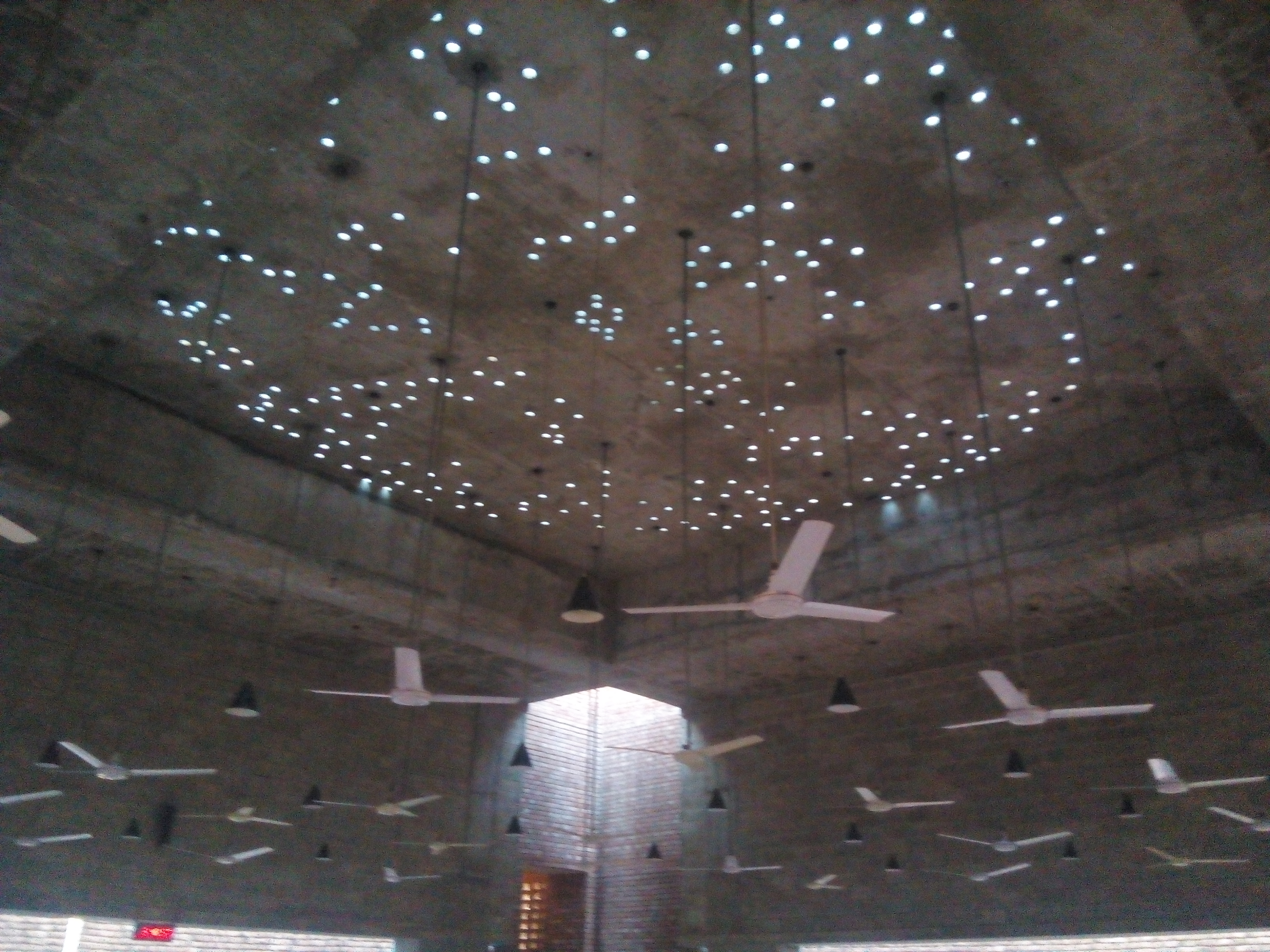
The use of natural light at Bait Ur Rouf Mosque

Baitur Rauf Mosque, completed in 2012 and designed by Bangladeshi architect Marina Tabassum, was one of six winners of the Aga Khan Award for Architecture in 2016, along with the Friendship Centre in Gaibandha. Other prominent architects who made notable contributions in this decade include Jalal Ahmad, Salauddin Ahmed, Saif Ul Haque, Ehsan Khan, Mubasshar Hussein, Mustapha Khalid Palash, Enamul Karim Nirjhar, and Rafiq Azam. In this decade the nation mourned the death of master architect Muzharul Islam (d. 2012), who is considered the pioneer of modern architecture in Bangladesh.

== See also ==
Years in Bangladesh in the decade of

2010s
2010
2011
2012
2013
2014
2015
2016
2017
2018
2019
