= A. K. Badrul Haque =

Bangladeshi judge

Justice of the High Court Division of Bangladesh
- In office 1996–2008

Personal details
- Born: 26 September 1941
- Died: 22 December 2013 (aged 72)
- Education: University of Dhaka
- Profession: Judge

A. K. Badrul Haque (26 September 1941 - 22 December 2013) was a justice of the High Court Division of the Bangladesh Supreme Court.

== Early life ==
Badrul Haque was born on 26 September 1941 in Patuakhali District, East Bengal, British Raj. He completed his bachelor's and master's degrees in history, and a law degree from the University of Dhaka.

== Career ==
Badrul Haque was elevated to the High Court Division as an additional judge on 1 June 1996. He was made a judge of the division on 31 May 1998.

Badrul Haque and Justice Fazlur Rahman criticized Judge Ali Noor, Chittagong Chief Metropolitan Magistrate, for sending a six-month-old to jail with her mother, Minati Nath, in a robbery case.

Badrul Haque was superseded multiple times by junior justices' promotion to the Appellate Division. In August 2006, Justice Md. Joynul Abedin was promoted, superseding him, Justice Syed Amirul Islam, and Justice Md. Hasan Amin, which was protested by lawyers.

Badrul Haque resigned from the High Court Division on 3 March 2008. He had been set to retire on 26 September 2008.

He participated in a mock trial of the war criminals of the Bangladesh Liberation War of 1971 organized by the Department of Law of the University of Dhaka in April 2010.

== Death ==
Badrul Haque died on 22 December 2013 at Apollo Hospitals, Dhaka.
