= MV Nazimuddin =

Ferry sunk in May 2008 in Bangladesh

MV Nazimuddin was a ferry that sank in the Ghorautura River in Bangladesh on 13 May 2008, killing at least 40 people.
