= 2007 Chittagong mudslides =

2007 natural disaster in Chittagong, Bangladesh

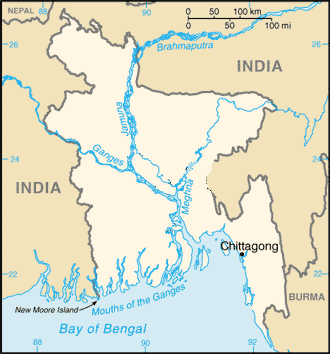
Location of Chittagong

The 2007 Chittagong mudslides (Bengali: ২০০৭ চট্টগ্রাম ভূমিধস) occurred in the port city of Chittagong in south-eastern Bangladesh. On 11 June 2007, heavy monsoon rainfall caused mudslides that engulfed slums around the hilly areas of the city. Experts had previously warned the increasing likelihood of landslides due to the Bangladesh government's failure in curbing the illegal hill cutting taking place in Chittagong.

== Extent of the disaster ==
One third of Chittagong, a city of five million residents, came under water due to heavy rainfall and tidal water in early June 2007. The flash floods in the hills caused mudslides and rubble to bury shanties at the foot of the hills near Chittagong Cantonment. Many residents took refuge in local mosques after losing their homes in the disaster. The death toll was reported to be at least 128, including at least 59 children, with more than 150 injured. This was expected to rise further as the rescue efforts got underway and additional reports were received. The government asked the local authorities to evacuate 8,000 people from Lebubagan, the worst hit area. The country-wide death toll from the floods and landslides neared 130 on 15 June, according to Reuters. Most of the deaths were a result of the landslides or from buildings collapsing in the rain.

Communication infrastructure was badly affected with telephone links with the rest of the country and within the city inoperable. Kalurghat Radio Station had to be shut down as its offices were submerged in six feet of water. Flights to the city's Shah Amanat International Airport, were suspended and the Chittagong Port, serving 90% of the country's foreign trade, was closed.

=== Disaster management ===
Bangladesh President Iajuddin Ahmed and his Chief Advisor Fakhruddin Ahmed remained in touch with the local administration to keep abreast of ongoing developments and the government approved Tk 9 lakh to assist the victims. This was the first natural disaster to befall the country since the caretaker government was put in place in January 2007.

== Causes of the disaster ==
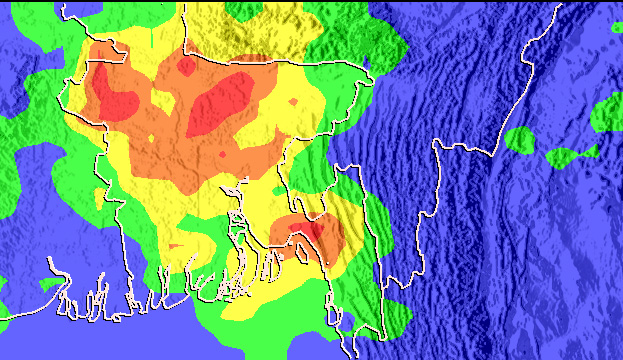
Rainfall totals over Bangladesh from 4 through 11 June 2007, based on measurements from the Tropical Rainfall Measuring Mission satellite. The heaviest rainfall, of up to 500 mm (20 inches), is shown in red. Orange, yellow, green and blue indicate rainfall up to 400, 300, 200 and 100 mm respectively.

Bangladesh's annual monsoon for 2007 started with unusually heavy rain, intensified by a storm from the Bay of Bengal on 9–10 June 2007. By 11 June, more than one-third of the southeastern coastal city of Chittagong was under water, reported the Australian Broadcasting Corporation. In addition to the floods, the rains triggered devastating landslides in the deforested hills on which the city is built.

Chittagong Deputy Commissioner Mukhlesur Rahman blamed hill cutting for the disaster. Lalkhan Bazar, one of the worst damaged areas in the mudslide, has been identified as one of the most affected by hill cutting led by influential people. Professor of geography and environmental studies in Chittagong University Shahidul Islam explained, "The only reason for Monday's mud slide in the cantonment area is cutting hills indiscriminately... We were warning about this risk for decades, and this event our fears real." Architect Jerina Hossain said, "Cutting hills made the soil slippery and loose. As a result, it came down with the rain."

Communications adviser of the Bangladesh government Major General MA Matin supervising the rescue operation on behalf of the Chief Adviser Fakhruddin Ahmed directed Chittagong divisional and district administration to identify those responsible for hill cutting on 14 June.

== Other areas ==
In the same monsoon onslaught other areas in Bangladesh suffered in varying degrees. In the nearby town of Comilla, to the north, 60,000 people were rendered homeless and in the adjacent district of Cox's Bazar, to the south, 400,000 people were marooned in floods. Three more people were injured in another mudslide in the nearby hill town of Rangamati to the east, where Kaptai Lake became dangerously overflooded to threaten a 230 megawatt hydro-electric plant. On the day of the mudslide in Chittagong, 11 people died in lightning strikes in Cox's Bazar, Noakhali and Brahmanbaria districts around the disaster damaged areas.
