= Mohammad Alam (Pakistani cricketer) =

Pakistani cricketer (born 1982)

Personal information
- Born: 1 March 1982 (age 44); Quetta, Pakistan
- Source: Cricinfo, 12 November 2015

Mohammad Alam (born 1 March 1982) is a Pakistani first-class cricketer who played for Quetta cricket team.
