= Abdul Hamid Miah =

Bangladeshi agriculturist and researcher

- মোহাম্মদ আব্দুল হামিদ মিয়া
- Known for: Agriculture Research
- Awards: Independence Day Award (2013)

Abdul Hamid Miah is a Bangladeshi agriculturist and researcher at the Bangladesh Rice Research Institute. He received the Independence Day Award, the highest civilian honour in Bangladesh, in 2013 for his unique contribution to research and education.

== Career ==
Miah has served as the chairman of the Bangladesh Agricultural Research Council.

Miah is in research and training. He received the Independence Day Award in 2013 in recognition of his unique contribution.
