= Shahid Qadri =

Bangladeshi poet and writer (1942–2016)

Shahid Quadri
- শহীদ কাদরী
- Pronunciation: [ʃoɦid̪ kad̪ɾi]
- Born: 14 August 1942; Park Circus, Kolkata, Bengal Presidency, British India
- Died: 28 August 2016 (aged 74); New York City, United States
- Writing career
- Language: Bengali
- Notable awards: Ekushey Padak; Bangla Academy Literary Award

Shahid Quadri (Note: Bengali pronunciation: [ʃoɦid̪ kad̪ɾi].) (Bengali pronunciation: [ʃoɦid̪ kad̪ɾi]; also spelt Shaheed Quaderi; 14 August 1942 – 28 August 2016) was a Bangladeshi poet and writer. For his poetry, he was awarded Bangla Academy Literary Award in 1973 and Ekushey Padak in 2011. His notable poems include "Uttoradhikar", "Tomake Obhibadon Priyotoma", "Kothao Kono Krondon Nei" and "Amar Chumbongulo Poucchey Dao".

== Early life and career ==
Qadri was born in Kolkata in 1942. He moved to Dhaka when he was 10 years old.

Qadri is one of the prominent poets of post-1947 Bengali poetry, who brought a new angle to the Bangladeshi scene by introducing urbanism and a sense of modernity. His poetry is infused with patriotism, cosmopolitanism and universalism and in its treatment of nature and city life, it delves deep into the conflicts and the sense of alienation pervading modern life.

Though he published only four books of poetry, "his tone, alliteration, images and the use of simile made him a unique contributor of Bengali verse."

Qadri became friends with poet Shamsur Rahman. At the age of fourteen, he was first published in Kabita, edited by Buddhadeb Bosu, who is also a major poet of the 1930s; Qadri subsequently became a well-known figure among the poets of Dhaka and Kolkata.

After the publication of his third book, Quadri stopped writing and started living in London and Germany. Later, in the 1980s, he moved to the United States and started living in Boston, where he married his second wife, Dana Quadri; she died in the late 90s. Since then, he has returned to writing again and published his fourth book in 2009. Although it has been said that "in the last issue of Kali O Kolom [he] broke his near three decades of silence by penning two poems," he actually broke his silence by contributing to the very first issue of Shabdaguchha, a bilingual poetry journal, published in New York.

His poems have been translated into English by many scholars, such as Kabir Chowdhury, Kaiser Haq, Farida Majid.

Have no fear, darling. I'll have it all arranged. The army will carry rose-bunches. On their shoulders, March past and salute. Only you, darling.

— I salute You, Darling, Shahid Qadri

His poetry has been published in Contemporary Bangladeshi Poetry (CCC & Feral Press, New York, 2019), edited and translated by Hassanal Abdullah, forwarded by Prof Nicholas Birns

== Death ==
Qadri died at the age of 74 on 28 August 2016, from kidney disease. He was hospitalized after struggling with serious renal issues a decade before his death.

== Works ==
- Uttaradhikar (Inheritance, 1967)
- Tomake Abhibadan Priyatama (Salute to You, Dearest; 1974)
- Kothayo Kono Krondon Nai (Weepings Nowhere, 1978)
- Amar Chombongullo Pouchhaya Deo (Please, Convey my kisses, 2009)
- Godhulir Gaan (A Song of Twilight, 2017)
- Prem Biraha Bhalobasar Kabita (Poems of Love and Separation)
