= Abdur Rahman Boyati =

Bangladeshi folk singer (1939–2013)

- Born: 1 January 1939; Dayaganj, Dhaka, Bengal Presidency, British India
- Died: 19 August 2013 (aged 74); Dhaka, Bangladesh
- Resting place: Sutrapur Panchayet Graveyard
- Awards: Ekushey Padak, (2015)

Abdur Rahman Boyati (1 January 1939 – 19 August 2013) was a Bangladeshi folk singer. He was also a lyricist, music composer, director, and poet. He was posthumously awarded the Ekushey Padak in 2015 by the government of Bangladesh. He is most notable for the hits "Mon Amar Deho Ghori Sondhan Kori", "Ei Prithibi Jemon Ache, Temni Pore Robe" and "Din Gele Ar Din Pabi Na".

== Early life and career ==
Abdur Rahman Boyati was born on 1 January 1939 at Dayaganj in old Dhaka. He started practicing mystic songs at an early stage by his mother's inspiration. His father's name is Tota Miah, and his mother's name is Mariyam Begum. He was married to Khatun Zara.

Boyati began his professional singing career in 1956 and formed Abdur Rahman's Group in 1982. Over his career, he released more than 500 albums covering nearly all folk genres and performed widely across Bangladesh and in over 40 countries. He was also an actor. He acted in Ashati, directed by Hafiz Uddin in 1989.

== Honors and awards ==
Boyati was awarded the Ekushey Padak in 2015. He was invited to a cultural show at the dinner party of George Bush Sr. held in the White House in 1990. For his contribution to the music of Bangladesh, Boyati won six national awards in total.
