= 2010 Eastern Indian storm =

Weather event in India and Bangladesh

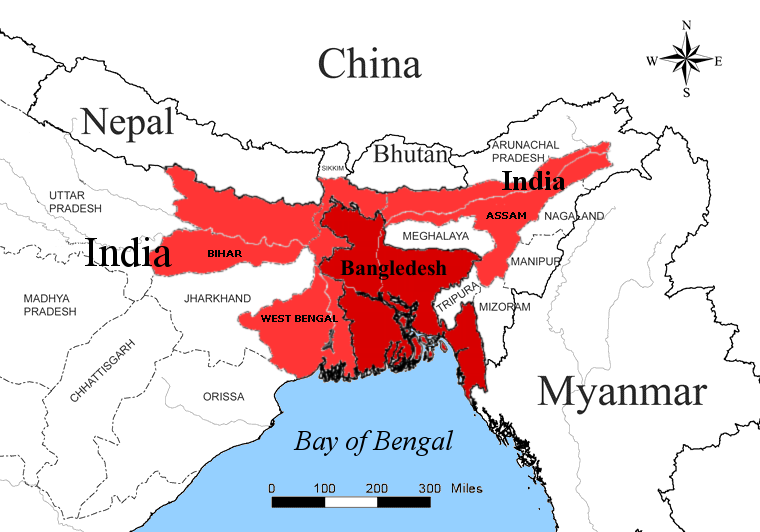
- Map of affected areas
- Date: 13 April 2010
- Time: 11 pm IST
- Location: Assam, Bihar, and West Bengal, India; Bangladesh
- Deaths: 140+
- Injuries: several hundred

At approximately 11 pm local time, 13 April 2010, a severe storm struck parts of Bangladesh and eastern India. It lasted about 90 minutes, with the most intense portion spanning 30–40 minutes. As of 16 April, more than 140 deaths have been reported. At least 91 people died in the Indian state of Bihar, 44 in West Bengal, and 4 in Assam. In Bangladesh, five deaths and two hundred injuries were reported. Most of the deaths were women and children crushed when their huts were destroyed. Over 91,000 dwellings were destroyed in India and several thousand in Bangladesh; approximately 300,000 dwellings were at least partially damaged. Both mud and pucca housing was damaged by the storm. Nearly 500,000 people were left homeless or otherwise affected by the storm.

== The storm ==
According to local officials the storm was an extreme nor'wester commonly formed over the Bay of Bengal during the hot months of the year. Meteorologist S.I. Laskar said the storm was due to an unstable atmosphere caused by excessive heat and humidity. "It is quite normal in the pre-monsoon season," he added. The severity of the storm was likely due to wind pulling the moisture from the Bay of Bengal northward to north Bihar, where it converged with another cloud formation to form a 20 km tall cloud mass. The cool air in the clouds was met by hot air rising from the ground, which caused the storm to start rotating. Although thunderstorms had been predicted, the severity of the storm was unexpected.

Although not a tropical cyclone, the storm brought back memories of Cyclone Aila, which killed 155 people in the same area in May 2009. One eyewitness described the storm: "It was all dark. I thought it was the end of the world and we were going to die." Locals received no warning of the impending storm, and were mostly sleeping when the storm hit, increasing the casualties. Out-dated equipment with limited capabilities was blamed for the lack of warnings.

The storm spawned a large tornado, which lasted about 20 minutes. It was the first tornado recorded in Bihar history. Tornadoes are a very rare occurrence in India – the last one was in 1998. Radar equipment which could have provided early warning had arrived in the area, but had not yet been installed because the building to house it was still under construction. The storm occurred during a heat wave with temperatures greater than 40 °C (104 °F) reported. West Bengal regional weather office director Gokul Chandra Debnath said that the heatwave "could have been a catalyst ... that triggered the tornado". The amount of damage caused directly by the tornado is unknown.

== Damage ==
The storm struck in northeastern parts of West Bengal and Bihar states, with winds estimated from 120 to 160 kilometres/hour (75–100 miles/hour), then moved into Bangladesh. The strong winds uprooted trees, displaced roof tops, and snapped telephone and electricity lines. The worst damage was reported in the towns of Hemtabad, Islampur, Kaliaganj, Karandighi, and Raiganj. Purina had the most reported casualties. Power was lost throughout the area, and communication was difficult due to severed phone lines and damaged rail lines. Nepal, which relies on India for part of its power generation, was also affected by the outages.

In Araria district, a jail was partially destroyed causing the transfer of 600+ inmates to another facility. In Rangpur, a police officer was killed and five other injured when a wall of the Rangpur Police Line building collapsed. The police barracks in Raiganj, which houses 300 officers, were partially destroyed. Several other police buildings had their roofs blown away.

The initial strong winds were followed by heavy rains, causing further damage to weakened structures. Widespread damage to crops and livestock was also reported in both West Bengal and Bihar, as well as in Bangladesh. More than 8,000 hectares of maize was destroyed in West Bengal. More than 4,000 hectares of maize and boro was destroyed in Bangladesh. In Assam, paddy crops, bananas, and other vegetation were damaged. Assam crops were already in poor shape due to earlier hail storms before 13 April storm, and were further damaged by another strong storm on 15 April.

== Aftermath and rescue efforts ==
Rescue efforts have been inhibited as many roads, including National Highway 34, are blocked by downed trees and telephone poles. Medical personnel and supplies were quickly rushed to the affected areas, and aid packages were announced. Aid workers began to distribute rice, dried fruits, water, and temporary tarpaulin shelters on 15 April. However, many remote regions remained inaccessible as of 16 April. Aid workers said that hundreds of thousands of victims had not received any relief by 16 April. Another rainstorm on 15 April added to frustrations.

On 16 April, Prime Minister Manmohan Singh announced an ex gratia payment Rs 100,000 to the next of kin to persons killed in the storm. The money will come from the Prime Minister's National Relief Fund. In the Lok Sabha, members have taken turns blaming each other's political parties for the delays. On 19 April, The Communist Party of India (Marxist) (CPM) asked for central assistance of Rs 10 billion for Bihar and Rs 5 billion for West Bengal. Prashanta Mazumdar additionally asked for government workers to assess the damage and distribute relief. Indian National Congress (INC) member Deepa Dasmunshi countered by saying the state administration had failed miserably. All India Trinamool Congress (AITC) leader Sudip Bandopadhyay agreed and added that the CPM was "more involved in state terrorism" against political opponents than distribution of aid. The CPM responded that West Bengal had done its best to provide relief. Dasmunshi strongly disagreed, claiming "not even one tarpaulin or piece of cloth has reached the victims. The state government has failed." The CPM and other left parties accused Dasmunshi and Bandopadhyay of "playing politics at the cost of human lives". Janata Dal (United) leader Sharad Yadav demanded that the House have a more thorough discussion on the matter.

=== In Bihar ===
In Bihar, storm victims are being given rice, cash, and asbestos sheets to rebuild their houses. Families of the deceased are also receiving money to pay for last rites plus an ex gratia payment of Rs 150,000 from the Chief Minister's Relief Fund. Phone service was restored to most of the region after 30 hours without service, However, areas near the Nepal-India border remained without power on 17 April. On 20 April, the Bihar Electricity Board said that it would be at least a month to repair all damaged electrical transmission towers. Rolling blackouts were conducted in Nepal to combat the decreased electricity availability.

On 16 April, the Bihar Pradesh Congress Committee called for the firing of Minister for Disaster Management Devesh Chandra Thakur, who was reportedly on vacation and had not visited the affected areas. On 22 April, the INC announced that it would distribute food and other relief to storm victims in the Purnia, Kishanganj, Katihar, Araria, and Supaul districts.

=== In West Bengal ===
In West Bengal, Civil Defense Minister Srikumar Mukherjee is personally overseeing rescue efforts. As of 15 April, all major roads and rail lines were cleared and power had been restored to 50% of the population. However, some of the hardest hit towns had not yet received any government aid by 16 April, causing widespread anger. Mukherjee admit state government was struggling to distribute food rations, blaming insufficient manpower for the delay. He has since asked district officials to purchase supplies locally. According to international aid agency ActionAid, only 7,000 tarpaulins had been distributed by 17 April; Mukherjee claimed 57,000 had been distributed. The state has announced cash relief of Rs 10,000 for the homeless and a Rs 200,000 payment for relatives of the deceased. A total of Rs 500,000 has been released to rebuild housing, and a metric ton of rice and 30,000 tarpaulin sheets have been released for direct aid.

Storm victims angry about the slow rate of aid distribution quickly turned to demonstrations and violence. In Karandighi, hundreds of protesters squatted on the highway, closing it down for three hours on 15 April. Protests were also held in Raniganj. On 16 April, "Thousands of villagers staged angry protests in front of government offices [in Karandighi and Hemtabad] demanding more relief materials and assaulted officials when they came to open the offices," according to West Bengal relief minister Mortaza Hossain. Riot police had to be dispatched to both Karandighi and Hematabad. In Hemtabad, angry villagers attacked the block development building and shut down the Raiganj-Balurghat state highway for 30 minutes. Raids on several rural offices were reported in the North Dinajpur district on 16 April. Accusations of corruption were made in Karandighi and Raiganj, with some storm victims claiming they received only part of their promised relief payments.

In Karandighi, anger lead to looting and later violence. Shortly after 2pm IST on 15 April, a delivery of 500 tarpaulin sheets arrived. Villagers seeing that the supply would not be enough for everyone in need decided to take matters into their own hands. Some protesters jumped a wall, broke into the godown, and looted the tarpaulins. Police were called in, but were blocked from entering the facility by protesters. One looter remarked "What else could I have done? The government is not helping us so we have to help ourselves." Just after noon on 16 April, an angry mob attacked Panchayat Pradhan Badal Singh and began to beat him. One of the perpetrators said he couldn't control his anger when he saw that Singh "was distributing the [tarpaulin] sheets only to his party supporters." Throughout the North Dinajpur district, panchayat leaders have fled their homes after being attacked by angry villagers.

On 19 April, protesters blocked National Highway 34 at Panisala in the Raiganj subdivision. Others surrounding the panchayat office demanding more relief. The police fired shots into the air to scare the crowd off the highway after it was shut down for about an hour. According to one report, the Socialist Unity Centre of India (Communist) was responsible for organising the road block. Later that evening, at 5:30pm IST, 1,500 people who had been dispersed earlier attacked the police at Sitgram. Three sub-inspectors were badly beaten and two police vehicles pushed into a ditch before the crowd was dispersed with tear gas and shots fired into the air. District magistrate Ramanuj Chakrabarty claimed that "the distribution of relief has picked up" and that the attack "was politically motivated."

=== In Assam ===
In Assam, food and building supplies have been distributed to storm victims. "We have taken all possible measures to provide relief and other financial assistance to people hit by the storm," remarked Relief and Rehabilitation minister Bhumidhar Barman. An ex gratia payment of Rs 5,000 was announced for the next of kin of storm victims, plus Rs 300,000 to be released at a later date.

=== In Bangladesh ===
In Bangladesh, power was restored to most areas by 16 April, although parts of Rangpur remained without power. In Dinajpur, locals frustrated about the lack of power attacked the Dinajpur Power Development office on 15 April. Police had to be called in to take control of the situation.
