= New Zealand cricket team in Bangladesh in 2010–11 =

	New Zealand	Bangladesh
- Dates: 5 October 2010 – 17 October 2010
Captains	Daniel Vettori	Mashrafe Mortaza (1 match) Shakib Al Hasan (3 match)

One Day International series
- Results: Bangladesh won the 5-match series 4–0
Most runs	Ross Taylor (110)	Shakib Al Hasan (213)
Most wickets	Kyle Mills (8)	Shakib Al Hasan (11)
- Player of the series: Shakib Al Hasan (Ban)

The New Zealand cricket team toured Bangladesh from 5 to 17 October 2010 for a five-match One Day Internationals (ODI) series. Bangladesh won four ODIs and the other was abandoned without play. This was Bangladesh's first series victory against a full-strength Test-playing nation (excepting the West Indies series plagued by players' strike).

== ODI series ==
=== 1st ODI ===
5 October 2010
Scorecard

Bangladesh; 228 (49.3 overs)	v	New Zealand; 200/8 (37 overs)
Shakib Al Hasan 58 (51); Kyle Mills 3/44 (9.3 overs)		Brendon McCullum 61 (45); Shakib Al Hasan 4/41 (8 overs)

Bangladesh won by 9 runs (D/L)
Shere Bangla National Stadium, Mirpur
Umpires: Enamul Haque (Ban) and Shavir Tarapore (Ind)
Player of the match: Shakib Al Hasan (Ban)

- Bangladesh won the toss and elected to bat.
- Rain reduced New Zealand's target to 210 runs from 37 overs according to the Duckworth–Lewis method.

=== 2nd ODI ===
8 October 2010
Scorecard

New Zealand	v	Bangladesh

Match abandoned without a ball bowled
Shere Bangla National Stadium, Mirpur
Umpires: Enamul Haque (Ban) and Shavir Tarapore (Ind)

- No play was possible due to rain.

=== 3rd ODI ===
11 October 2010
Scorecard

New Zealand; 173 (42.5 overs)	v	Bangladesh; 177/3 (40 overs)
Ross Taylor 62* (72); Suhrawadi Shuvo 3/14 (10 overs)		Shahriar Nafees 73 (73); Nathan McCullum 2/31 (10 overs)

Bangladesh won by 7 wickets
Shere Bangla National Stadium, Mirpur
Umpires: Aleem Dar (Pak) and Nadir Shah (Ban)
Player of the match: Suhrawadi Shuvo (Ban)

- Bangladesh won the toss and elected to field.

=== 4th ODI ===
14 October 2010
Scorecard

Bangladesh; 241 (48.1 overs)	v	New Zealand; 232 (49.3 overs)
Shakib Al Hasan 106 (113); Hamish Bennett 3/44 (8 overs)		Kane Williamson 108 (132); Shakib Al Hasan 3/54 (10 overs)

Bangladesh won by 9 runs
Sher-e-Bangla Cricket Stadium, Mirpur
Umpires: Aleem Dar (Pak) and Sharfuddoula (Ban)
Player of the match: Shakib Al Hasan (Ban)

- New Zealand won the toss and elected to field.
- ODI Debut: Hamish Bennett (NZ)

=== 5th ODI ===
17 October 2010
Scorecard

Bangladesh; 174 (44.2 overs)	v	New Zealand; 171 (49.3 overs)
Shakib Al Hasan 36 (47); Daniel Vettori 3/32 (10 overs)		Grant Elliott 59 (105); Rubel Hossain 4/25 (9.3 overs)

Bangladesh won by 3 runs
Shere Bangla National Stadium, Mirpur
Umpires: Aleem Dar (Pak) and Nadir Shah (Ban)
Player of the match: Rubel Hossain (Ban)

- Bangladesh won the toss and elected to bat.
