= Shahidul Karim =

Bangladeshi Judge

Justice of the High Court Division of Bangladesh
- Incumbent
- Assumed office 20 April 1983

Personal details
- Born: 11 March 1958 (age 68)
- Education: University of Dhaka
- Profession: Judge

Shahidul Karim is a justice of the High Court Division of the Bangladesh Supreme Court.

== Early life ==
Shahidul Karim was born on 11 March 1958. He did his bachelor's and master's in law from the University of Dhaka.

== Career ==
Shahidul Karim joined the judicial branch of the Bangladesh Civil Service on 20 April 1983 as a munsif.

Shahidul Karim was promoted to district and sessions judge on 24 February 2000.

On 20 October 2011, Shahidul Karim was made an additional judge of the High Court Division. His appointment was made permanent on 7 October 2013.

In November 2017, Shahidul Karim and Justice M Enayetur Rahim said no one was above prosecution in a hearing on a letter the administrative branch of the Bangladesh Supreme Court to the Anti Corruption Commission which suggested that the commission did not have the authority to investigate retired Supreme Court judge Md Joynul Abedin.

In March 2018, Shahidul Karim and Justice M Enayetur Rahim asked the government to explain why the jail sentence of former prime minister Khaleda Zia in the Zia Charitable Trust corruption case should not be enhanced. The bench also granted bail to Khaleda Zia for four months.

In January 2023, Shahidul Karim and Justice Md Mostafizur Rahman commuted the death sentence of Abdul Jalil to life sentence in the case over the murder of his wife in 2003 in Barguna District.

Shahidul Karim and Justice Md Mostafizur Rahman are hearing the July 2016 Dhaka attack case. They are also holding the 2004 arms and ammunition haul in Chittagong case. In June 2023, Shahidul Karim, Justices Naima Haider, and S M Kuddus Zaman in a verdict on the Vested Property Return Act, 2001 upheld the authority of district commissioners to control vested properties.
