= Helena Khan =

Bengali educationalist and writer (1927–2019)

- হেলেনা খান
- Born: 23 March 1927
- Died: 15 March 2019 (aged 91); Atlanta, Georgia, U.S.
- Education: Lady Brabourne College
- Writing career
- Genre: Children Literature
- Notable awards: full list

Helena Khan (23 March 1927 – 15 March 2019) was a Bangladeshi educationist and writer. She completed her Bachelor of Arts degree from Lady Brabourne College. In her career, she had served in five different government schools.

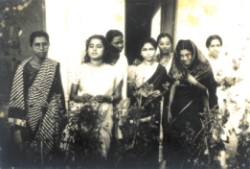
Helena Khan (fourth from the right) among other students in front of the Lady Brabourne College (1948)

== Awards ==
- Nurunnesa Khatun Bidyabinodini Literary Award (1976)
- Bangladesh Shishu Academy Purashkar (2001)
- Bangla Academy Literary Award (2008)
- Ekushey Padak (2010)
