= Gaus Khan =

- গাউস খান
- Born: 25 March 1909; Sylhet District
- Died: 20 May 1980 (aged 71)
- Citizenship: Bangladesh
- Awards: Independence Day Award (২০১১)

Gaus Khan (25 March 1909 – 20 May 1980) was a prominent politician in Bangladesh and a British expatriate organizer. He was awarded the Independence Day Award in 2011 for his unique contribution to the formation of public opinion and the collection of foreign aid during the Bangladesh Liberation war.

== Career ==
During the Bangladesh Liberation war in 1971, he organized the expatriates to launch a massive campaign to raise funds, organize protest rallies, conduct diplomatic activities, and publicize the human rights violation by Pakistani soldiers.

Khan was a leader of Bengali migrants in the United Kingdom. In 1970, he was appointed the President of the U.K. branch of Awami League.

== Awards ==
Khan was awarded Independence Day Award, Bangladesh's highest civilian award in 2011 for outstanding contribution to Bangladesh Liberation war.
