= Bangladeshi cricket team in Pakistan in 2007–08 =

5 match visit

The Bangladeshi national cricket team visited Pakistan in April 2008 and played a five-match One Day International (ODI) series which Pakistan won 5–0. Bangladesh were captained by Mohammad Ashraful and Pakistan by Shoaib Malik.
