= Jamaluddin Hossain =

Bangladeshi actor (1943–2024)

- জামালউদ্দিন হোসেন
- Born: 14 October 1943; 24 Parganas, Bengal Province, British India
- Died: 11 October 2024 (aged 81); Calgary, Alberta, Canada
- Education: Bangladesh University of Engineering and Technology
- Spouse: Rowshan Ara Hussain (m. 1965)

Jamaluddin Hossain (8 October 1943 – 11 October 2024) was a Bangladeshi actor, director and theatre activist. He was awarded the Ekushey Padak by the Government of Bangladesh in 2013.

== Education and career ==
Hossain was born on 14 October 1943 in 24 Parganas in the then Bengal Province, British India. After the 1947 partition of India, his family settled in Chittagong in the then East Bengal. He first studied in Saint Placid's School in Chittagong. He then graduated from Chittagong College and Bangladesh University of Engineering and Technology. He was a classmate of actor Abul Hayat in these institutions.

Hossain was a member of Nagarik Natya Sampradaya, a theatre troupe from 1975 until 1995. In 1997, he started his own troupe Nagarik Natyangan Ensamble and served as its general secretary. He was the presidium member of the Bangladesh Group Theatre Federation (BGTF) and general secretary of the Betar Television Shilpi Sangsad.

== Personal life and death ==
Hossain married actress Rowshan Ara Hussain in 1965. They met while they were the members of the theatre troupe Nagarik Natya Sampradaya. Their son, Tasfin Hossain Topu, is an assistant professor at Mount Royal University in Calgary.

Hossain was under treatment at Rockyview General Hospital in Calgary when he died on 11 October 2024, at the age of 81.

== Works ==
Hossain directed notable theatre plays including Khanchar Bhitor Achin Pakhi, Raja Rani, Chand Boniker Pala, Ami Noi, Bibishab and Jugol Bondi.
