= Imdad Hossain =

Bangladeshi artist and language movement activist

- ইমদাদ হোসেন
- Born: 1926; Rohitpur, Bengal Presidency, British India (now in Keraniganj Upazila, Bangladesh)
- Died: November 13, 2011 (aged 85); Dhaka, Bangladesh
- Resting place: Rohitpur Graveyard, Keraniganj
- Occupation: Artist

Imdad Hossain (c. 1926 – November 13, 2011) was a Bangladeshi artist and language movement activist. He was awarded Ekushey Padak in 2010 by the Government of Bangladesh.

== Education and career ==
Hossain graduated from Dacca Art College (later Faculty of Fine Arts, University of Dhaka). He co-founded "Agrani Shilpa Shongo" in 1952.

Hossain designed sets for Bangladesh Television as a chief designer. He was also the chief designer of Bangladesh Small and Cottage Industry Corporation.

== Awards ==
- Ekushey Padak (2010)
- Bangla Academy Fellowship (2009)
