= Jyotipal Mahathero =

Tenth Sangharaja of Buddhist order in Bangladesh

- Born: Dbarika Mohan Singh; 5 January 1914; Kemtali, Laksam, Comilla District, Bengal Presidency
- Died: 12 April 2002 (aged 88); Mumbai, India

Jyotipal Mahathero (1914–2002) was a Bangladeshi Buddhist monk. He was the 10th Sangharaja (supreme patriarch) of Buddhists in Bangladesh.

The Buddhist communities in Bangladesh have been benefited for the practice of the Buddha's teaching because of Sangharaja Jyotipal Mahathero's profound intellect in Buddhism. It was he who established a number of Buddhist educational centres around the main original Buddhist centres at his native land of Comilla in Bangladesh. Many of his students and disciples are now living in various Buddhist countries and trying to propagate of Buddhism for the sake of humanity. That is to say, presently Buddhist institutions, scholars and many Buddhist developmental works are from Jyotipal Mahathero's instructive model. One of his Buddhist knowledges is that he would never discriminate among the Buddhists, Muslims, Christians and Hindus in Bangladesh. He wrote a number of books for the better understanding of the Buddha's teachings, and now modern Buddhist scholars and in higher academic studies of Buddhism have widely been using for the further development of Buddhist researches

== Early life ==
Mahathero was born on 5 January 1914 in Kemtali, Laksam Upazila, Comilla District. His father's name was Chandramoni Singh and his mother's name was Draupadi Bala Singh.

== Career ==
Mahathero was initiated into Shramanya Dharma in 1933 at the age of 15. He became a monk in 1937. He acquired proficient knowledge of Pali language, literature, etc. at Pahartali Mahamuni Pali College, Calcutta and Nalanda Vidya Bhavana. He was proficient in Bengali, Hindi, Pali, English and Sanskrit languages.

Mahathero is the founder of many charitable organizations, such as Boys 'High School in 1991, Chittagong University Peace Pagoda in 1982, Girls' High School (now College), Orphanage, etc.

Mahathero was granted the title of World Citizen by the United Nations in 1995. He received the title of Epitome Master from Nalanda Vidya Bhavana. He was the Sangharaja, the highest religious guru of Bangladeshi Buddhists. He is the 10th religious guru of Buddhists in Bangladesh. He was awarded the title of 'Aggamhadharmjoti Kadhwaj' by the Government of Myanmar. His temple is named after him 'Sangharaj Jyoti: Pal Mahath's Buddhist Mahavihara Complex.

== Death and legacy ==
Mahathero died on 12 April 2002, at the age of 92. He was buried with full state honors for his contribution to the Bangladesh Liberation war. He received the Ekushey Padak in 2010 and the Independence Day Award (posthumously) in 2011.
