= Mohammad Alam (photojournalist) =

- Died: January 11, 2008 (aged 82); Dhaka, Bangladesh
- Occupation: photo journalist
- Awards: Ekushey Padak (2010)

Mohammad Alam was a Bangladeshi photo journalist. He is a recipient of Ekushey Padak.

== Career ==
In 1968, Alam joined The Azad in Dhaka. In 1971, during the Bangladesh Liberation war, he joined the Mujibnagar Government. After the Independence of Bangladesh, he was appointed the official photographer of the Prime Minister of Bangladesh, Sheikh Mujibur Rahman. In 1975, he resigned from government service and joined The Sangbad. In 1983, he joined The Daily Ittefaq.

In 2010, Alam was awarded the Ekushey Padak for his contribution to journalism.

== Death ==
Alam died on 11 January 2008 in Dhaka, Bangladesh. His burial was given a guard of honor by Bangladesh Police.
