= A.H.M. Noman Khan =

Bangladeshi disability rights activist

A.H.M. Noman Khan (Bengali: এ.এইচ.এম. নোমান খান) is a pioneer in mainstreaming persons with disabilities in the development process of Bangladesh. He was awarded the Ramon Magsaysay Award in 2010. He is the executive director of Centre for Disability in Development (CDD).
