= Syed Amirul Islam =

Bangladeshi lawyer and judge (died 2022)

Syed Amirul Islam (1935/1936 – 7 September 2022) was a Bangladeshi lawyer who served as judge of the Bangladesh High Court.

== Career ==
On 7 February 1994, Islam was appointed a judge on the Bangladesh High Court. In 2003, Justice M. A. Aziz was promoted to the Supreme Court of Bangladesh, superseding Islam. This was the third time Islam had been superseded. The Supreme Court Bar Association expressed concerns over the fact that Islam was superseded.

In 2003, Islam made a trip to Feni, Bangladesh. Under court rules, the Feni district and sessions judge, Md Firoz Alam, should have met Islam on arrival and assisted him with accommodations and other needs. However, Alam did not show up and, despite several contact attempts by Islam, never appeared. Islam reported this breach of protocol to the High Court, which in February 2019 fined Alam for his actions.

In 2007, Islam retired from the High Court. He was appointed State Counsel on the International Crimes Tribunal in 2013.
