= 2018 in Bangladesh =

- Centuries: 20th; 21st
- Decades: 1990s; 2000s; 2010s; 2020s
- See also: Other events of 2018; List of years in Bangladesh

2018 (MMXVIII) was a common year starting on Monday of the Gregorian calendar, the 2018th year of the Common Era (CE) and Anno Domini (AD) designations, the 18th year of the 3rd millennium and the 21st century, and the 9th year of the 2010s decade.

The year 2018 was the 47th year after the independence of Bangladesh. It was also the fifth year of the third term of the government of Sheikh Hasina.

== Incumbents ==
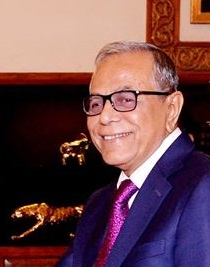
Abdul
Hamid

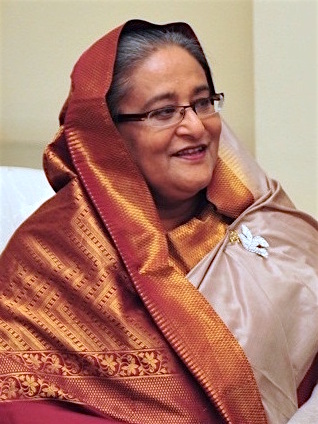
Sheikh
Hasina

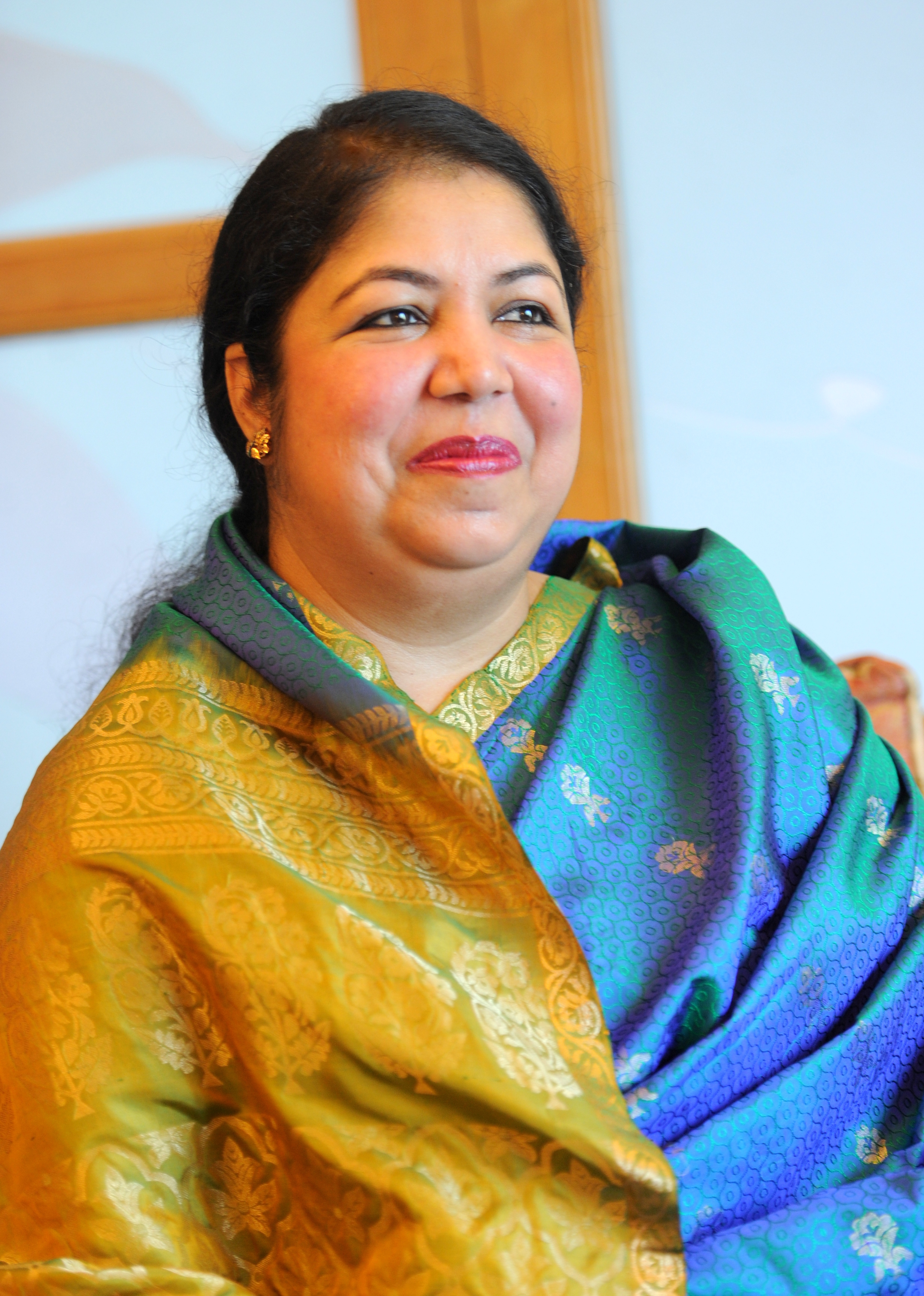
Shirin
Sharmin

- President: Mohammad Abdul Hamid
- Prime Minister: Sheikh Hasina
- Chief Justice: Syed Mahmud Hossain
- Speaker of Jatiya Sangsad: Shirin Sharmin Chaudhury

== Demography ==
Demographic Indicators for Bangladesh in 2018
| Population, total | 161,376,713 |
| Population density (per km^{2}) | 1239.7 |
| Population growth (annual %) | 1.1% |
| Male to Female Ratio (every 100 Female) | 102.5 |
| Urban population (% of total) | 36.6% |
| Birth rate, crude (per 1,000 people) | 18.2 |
| Death rate, crude (per 1,000 people) | 5.5 |
| Mortality rate, under 5 (per 1,000 live births) | 32 |
| Life expectancy at birth, total (years) | 72.3 |
| Fertility rate, total (births per woman) | 2.0 |

== Economy ==
Key Economic Indicators for Bangladesh in 2018
National Income
| | Current US$ | Current BDT | % of GDP |
|---|---|---|---|
| GDP | $274.0 billion | BDT22.5 trillion | |
| GDP growth (annual %) | 7.9% | | |
| GDP per capita | $1,698.1 | BDT139,455 | |
| Agriculture, value added | $35.8 billion | BDT2.9 trillion | 13.1% |
| Industry, value added | $78.2 billion | BDT6.4 trillion | 28.5% |
| Services, etc., value added | $145.1 billion | BDT11.9 trillion | 53.0% |
Balance of Payment
| | Current US$ | Current BDT | % of GDP |
| Current account balance | -$7.1 billion | | -2.6% |
| Imports of goods and services | $65.6 billion | BDT5.3 trillion | 23.4% |
| Exports of goods and services | $44,128.0 million | BDT3.3 trillion | 14.8% |
| Foreign direct investment, net inflows | $2,421.6 million | | 0.9% |
| Personal remittances, received | $15,566.2 million | | 5.7% |
| Total reserves (includes gold) at year end | $32,028.4 million | | |
| Total reserves in months of imports | 5.7 | | |

Note: For 2018, the average official exchange rate for BDT was 83.47 per US$.

== Events ==
- 7 January - Mritunjoyi Mujib is inaugurated.
- 8 January - Severe cold wave sweeps over the country. Several cities across the country record their record low temperature. Tetulia in Panchagarh District records 2.6° Celsius, the lowest in the country's history.
- 10 January - Tablighi Jamaat holds a mass blockade protesting against and preventing the entry of Indian scholar Maulana Saad Kandhalvi to the holy Islamic gathering for the Bishwa Ijtema, who is forced to return home in the face of the protests.
- 8 February - Ex Prime Minister and BNP Chairperson Khaleda Zia, as per court verdict, is jailed for 5 years in the Zia Charitable Trust corruption case. She is imprisoned in the old Dhaka Central Jail located on Nazimuddin Road.
- 11 April - The Prime Minister announces the abolition of the quota system in government recruitment in response to the Bangladesh Quota Reform Protests 2018.
- May - 2018–2019 Bangladesh drug war.
- 5 May - Unidentified gunmen ambush and assassinate 5 people in Rangamati district, including UPDF leader Tapan Jyoti Chakma. It is suspected the attack was caused by internal conflicts between rival Chackma factions. This is the deadliest such incident involving the indigenous tribal Chackma people since the signing of the Chittagong Hill Tracts Peace Accord in 1997.
- 26 May - Kazi Nazrul Islam University of West Bengal awarded PM Sheikh Hasina with a Doctorate of Literature.
- 23 June - 52 people are killed in a road accident in a single day as people were returning from Eid vacation. This is the country's highest reported number of casualties from a road crash in a single day in recent times.
- 29 July - 10 August - On 29 July, two college students are killed and nine others injured when a bus hits them in the capital Dhaka. Students all over the city carry out mass protests demanding punishment of the culprits and an end to reckless driving in the country.
- 22 September - In a massive rally, the newly formed coalition Jatiya Oikya Front, a platform led by Kamal Hossain, issues an ultimatum from the rally for the three-point demand to be met by 30 September. The demands include: 1. Formation of a polls-time neutral government, 2. effective steps for reconstituting the Election Commission, 3. dissolution of parliament before the announcement of the election schedule. Several top leaders of the main opposition party BNP show their support and share the stage with Kamal Hossain and his alliance at a citizens' rally in the capital and vow a joint movement to accomplish the three-point demands.
- 10 October - Court verdict against the 2004 grenade attack is given. Top BNP leader Lutfuzzaman Babar is given the death penalty, and Tariqe Rahman is given a life term imprisonment. The BNP rejects the verdict and carries out protests against it.
- 30 December - The 2018 Bangladeshi general election is held, with a decisive victory for ruling party Bangladesh Awami League.

=== Awards and recognitions ===
- Ahmed Zawad Chowdhury won the first gold medal for Bangladesh in the International Mathematical Olympiad.

==== Independence Day Award ====
Eighteen people were awarded.

| Recipients | Area | Note |
|---|---|---|
| Quazi Zakir Hasan | independence and liberation war | posthumous |
| SMA Rashidul Hasan | independence and liberation war | posthumous |
| Sankar Govinda Chowdhury | independence and liberation war | posthumous |
| Sultan Mahmud | independence and liberation war | |
| M Abdur Rahim | independence and liberation war | posthumous |
| Bhupati Bhushan Chowdhury | independence and liberation war | posthumous |
| Lieutenant Mohammad Anwarul Azim | independence and liberation war | posthumous |
| Humayun Rashid Choudhury | independence and liberation war | posthumous |
| Amanullah Asaduzzaman | independence and liberation war | posthumous |
| Matiur Rahman Mallik | independence and liberation war | posthumous |
| Sergeant Zahrul Haq | independence and liberation war | posthumous |
| Amzadul Haq | independence and liberation war | |
| AK M D Ahsan Ali | medicine | |
| AK Azad Khan | social service | |
| Selina Hossain | literature | |
| M Abdul Mazid | food security | |
| Asaduzzaman Noor | culture | |
| Shykh Seraj | agricultural journalism | |

==== Ekushey Padak ====
The award was given to 21 persons.

1. AZM Takiullah (language movement)
2. Mirza Mazharul Islam (language movement)
3. Sheikh Sadi Khan (music)
4. Shujeo Shyam (music)
5. Indra Mohan Rajbongshi (music)
6. Khurshid Alam (music)
7. Motiul Haque Khan (music)
8. Minu Haque (dance)
9. Humayun Faridi (acting)
10. Nikhil Sen (drama)
11. Kalidas Karmakar (fine arts)
12. Golam Mostofa (photography)
13. Ranesh Maitra (journalism)
14. Zulekha Haque (research)
15. Muinul Islam (economics)
16. Ilias Kanchan (social service)
17. Syed Manzoorul Islam (language and literature)
18. Saiful Islam Khan (poet Hayat Saef) (language and literature)
19. Subrata Barua (language and literature)
20. Rabiul Hussain (language and literature)
21. Khalekdad Chowdhury (language and literature)

=== Sports ===
- 18 March - Bangladesh lost to India in a closely contested T-20 Cricket Match in the Final of 2018 Nidahas Trophy.
- 6 August - Bangladesh won the 3 match T-20 Cricket series against the defending T-20 Cricket Champions, West indies, 2–1.
- 8 October - Bangladesh under 18 women's football team won the 2018 SAFF U-18 Women's Championship.
- 4 November - Bangladesh national under-15 football team won the 2018 SAFF U-15 Championship, defeating Pakistan national under-15 football team in the final.
- 16 November - Bangladesh ties the two match test cricket series against Zimbabwe, 1-1, after beating Zimbabwe in the 2nd and final test match by a historic 218 runs.

== Deaths ==
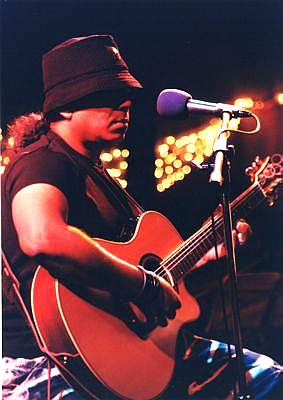
Ayub Bachchu

- 5 January – Dhiraj Kumar Nath, diplomat (b. 1945).
- 16 January – Shammi Akhtar, singer
- 25 January – Shawkat Ali, writer (b. 1936)
- 5 March – Rafiqul Islam, physician (born c.1936).
- 6 March – Ferdousi Priyabhashini, sculptor (b. 1947)
- 21 March – Noorjahan Kakon Bibi, freedom fighter and secret agent (b. 1915)
- 21 April – Anwara Begum, 83, academic and former First Lady.
- 24 April – Belal Chowdhury, poet (b. 1938)
- 26 April – Shamsul Islam, politician (b. 1931).
- 9 May – Mustafa Nur-Ul Islam, academic, National Professor (b. 1927).
- 22 May –
  - Tazin Ahmed, journalist, actress, playwright, director, and theater person (b 1975).
  - Hafiz Siddiqi, academic (b. 1931).
- 26 June – Ahsanullah Montu, footballer (b. 1962).
- 7 July – Rani Sarker, film actress (b. 1930s).
- 25 July – Kalparanjan Chakma, politician (b. 1918).
- 26 July – Mostafa Suja, politician (born c.1950).
- 18 October - Ayub Bachchu, leading musician (born 1962).
- 15 December - Amjad Hossain, film actor and director (born 1942).

== See also ==
- 2010s in Bangladesh
- List of Bangladeshi films of 2018
- Timeline of Bangladeshi history
