= Sarbadaliya Chhatra Sangram Parishad =

Student organisation in East Pakistan

Sarbadaliya Chhatra Sangram Parishad (SAC)
- সর্বদলীয় ছাত্র সংগ্রাম পরিষদ
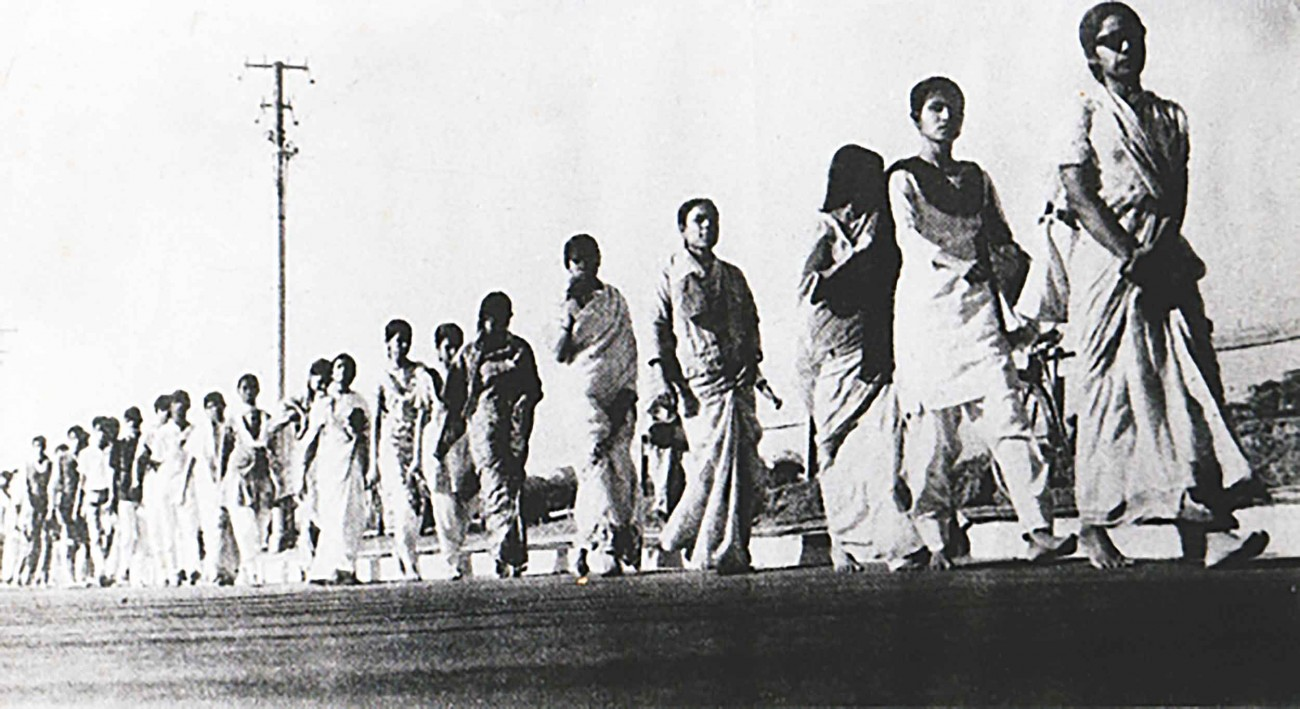
- A procession of Dhaka University students led by Deepa Sen on 25 January 1969
- Type: Student movement
- Purpose: Eleven Points Programme; Mass uprising of 1969
- Region served: East Pakistan, Dhaka

Sarbadaliya Chhatra Sangram Parishad (Bengali: সর্বদলীয় ছাত্র সংগ্রাম পরিষদ, lit. 'All Party Student Action Committee') was a student organisation which played a pivotal role in the political history of Bangladesh, then known as East Pakistan. Formed amidst the backdrop of civil unrest and political dissatisfaction, this student-led organization became the voice of a burgeoning movement demanding greater autonomy for East Pakistan. Their activism was instrumental in the mass uprising of 1969, which not only challenged the military regime of Ayub Khan but also ignited the call for democracy. The efforts of these students were a significant precursor to the eventual independence of Bangladesh, highlighting the power of collective action and the impact of youth in shaping the course of a nation's history.

== History ==
Sarbadaliya Chhatra Sangram Parishad was formed on 4 January 1969. It was formed through the joining of the East Pakistan Student Union (Matia), East Pakistan Chhatra League, East Pakistan Student Union (Menon), and student leaders of Dhaka University Student Union. The Parishad created an Eleven Points Programme that was based on the 1965 Six Point program of Sheikh Mujibur Rahman and the Awami League. The Parishad was based in the University of Dhaka and it became the principal political entity of East Pakistan. The Parishad spread to different universities in East Pakistan. The Parishad called a meeting on 17 January despite the Police placing section 144. The police and students clashed in the streets which injured many students and an EPR bus was burned down.

The Parishad called a strike on 20 January throughout the province. Amanullah Asaduzzaman, a student, was killed by police firing in the strike. The Parishad in response called strikes and processions from 21 to 24 January. On 24 January, clashes took place throughout the province between strikers and police personal. Two protesters were killed in Mymensingh due to police action. Many were injured throughout the province. Matiur Rahman Mallik, a class nine student of Nabakumar Institution, and Rustam Ali were killed in Dhaka. 61 activists were killed in the protests. The student league formed Kendriya Chhatra Sangram Parishad on 12 January 1970 thus ending Sarbadaliya Chhatra Sangram Parishad. Its protest stopped the Agartala conspiracy trial and forced the Pakistan government to release Sheikh Mujibur Rahman.

== Legacy ==
The movement laid down the foundation for Awami League to win the 1970 Pakistani general election and the start of Bangladesh War of Independence.
