= JKS =

JKS may refer to:

== Organizations ==
- Japan Karate Shoto Federation, a karate association founded by Tetsuhiko Asai
- Jatiya Krishak Samity, a farmers organization in Bangladesh
- JKS Restaurants, owners of Indian restaurants in London including Gymkhana

== People ==
- J. K. Simmons (born 1955), American actor
- James Kenneth Stephen (1859–1892), English poet and tutor to Prince Albert Victor
- JKS (director), an Indian film director
- Makoto Saitō (wrestler) (born 1974; also Jimmy K-ness J.K.S.), a Japanese professional wrestler for Dragon Gate
- Jaron-Keawe Sagapolutele (born 2006), American college football quarterback

== Other uses ==
- Java KeyStore, a repository of security certificates
- The Journal of Korean Studies, a biannual peer-reviewed academic journal covering Korean studies
