= Farhang-e-Rabbani (Jadid) =

Urdu-Bangla dictionary

Farhang-e-Rabbani (Jadid) is an Urdu-Bangla dictionary. It was first published in 1952. It was certified by Dr. Muhammad Shahidullah and Suniti Kumar Chatterji. It was the first Bangla-Urdu dictionary, when Bangladesh was part of the Dominion of Pakistan as East Bengal. This dictionary was collected or made by Shiraj Rabbani.
