= Mass Uprising Day =

Bangladesh day of celebration

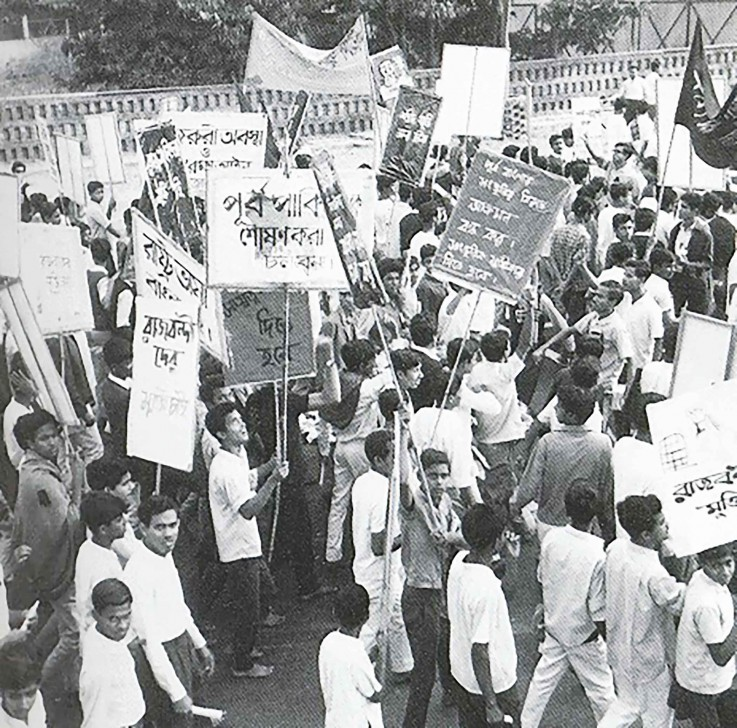
A student procession at the University of Dhaka campus during the mass uprising of 1969.

Mass Uprising Day (Bengali: গণঅভ্যুত্থান দিবস) is observed in Bangladesh on 24 January to mark the 1969 East Pakistan mass uprising, the climax of the movement of the people of the then East Pakistan for autonomy in 1969 that eventually led to the Independence War and emergence of Bangladesh in 1971.

On this day in 1969 Matiur Rahman Mallik, a standard IX student of the Nabakumar Institution, and Rustam Ali, a rickshaw-puller, were killed in police fire on demonstrators in Dhaka as the Pakistani rulers desperately tried to suppress the popular uprising. The killings sparked off intense protests across the country that eventually saw the fall of the Ayub regime.

It is said by politicians that the day teaches Bangladeshis the values of democracy and to protest against oppression.
