= Eleven Points Programme =

Demands

The Eleven Points Programme was a charter of demands in East Pakistan that called for reforms and the resignation of President Ayub Khan. It was led by students and was a successor to the six point movement led by Sheikh Mujibur Rahman.

== History ==
The Eleven Points Programme was based on the six point movement. The six point movement, started in 1966, called for the restoration of democracy and the resignation of military ruler, President Ayub Khan. The earlier movement fluttered after the mass arrest of Awami League politicians who had been leading the movement. Sheikh Mujibur Rahman and senior Awami League leaders were arrested on the Agartala Conspiracy Case. The democracy movement was taken over by the newly formed Pakistan Democratic Movement and Democratic Action Committee. However, both these failed to achieve required intensity.

In October 1968, two fractions of East Pakistan Students Union, led by Rashed Khan Menon and Matia Chowdhury, and the East Pakistan Students League formed an alliance called the Sarbadaliya Chhatra Sangram Parishad (All Party Student Movement Council in Bengali). The Parishad announced an 11-point demand that called for education reform, restoration of democracy, and autonomy for East Pakistan. The demands incorporated all the demands of the opposition in East Pakistan and the students became the leaders of the movement against President Ayub Khan. This culminated in the 1969 mass uprising and the subsequent withdrawal of Agartala Conspiracy Case.

On 24 January 1971, in the backdrop of outbreak of the Bangladesh Liberation War, the mass uprising was commemorated and all political groups of East Pakistan (barring Islamist groups like Jamaat-e-Islami) reiterated the 11-point demand.

== 11 points ==
1. Cancellation of all anti-Bengali language actions like the recommendations of the Hamidur Rahman Education Committee & the Dhaka University Ordinance (which stripped it of its autonomy) alongside reduction in monthly tuition fees of the university students.

2. Restoration of parliamentary democracy based on universal adult franchise, freedom of the press & uplifting the ban on The Daily Ittefaq

3. Complete autonomy for East Pakistan based on the previous 6-points.

4. Formation of a federal government in West Pakistan consisting of the autonomous provinces of Punjab, Sindh, Khyber Pakhtunkhwa & Balochistan (which had been dissolved by the Ayub Khan government under the One Unit Scheme)

5. Nationalisation of banks, insurance companies & all large industries, including jute processing units.

6. Decreased taxation upon the farmers & setting the minimum price of raw jute at 40 rupees.

7. Providing respectable wages, education, treatment & residence to the workers alongside recognition to their right to strike.

8. Taking adequate steps to control floods & utilising the water resources of East Pakistan.

9. Abrogation of all draconian laws enacted by the military regime of Ayub Khan.

10. Pakistan's exit from SEATO & CENTO alongside formulation of a neutral foreign policy

11. Abrogation of warrants against those accused of participating in the Agartala Conspiracy Case alongside release of all students, farmers, workers & political activists imprisoned throughout the country convicted under it.
