= Niaz Mohammad Chowdhury =

Bangladeshi classical and modern singer

Ustad Niaz Mohammad Chowdhury নিয়াজ মোহাম্মদ চৌধুরী
- Born: 25 October 1952 (age 73); Narsingdi, East Pakistan
- Genres: Bengali Modern, Ghazal, Classical, Nazrul Geeti, Bangla Kheyal
- Occupations: singer-songwriter, music composer
- Instruments: Vocals, Harmonium
- Labels: G-Series
- Website: NiazMohammadChowdhury.music

Niaz Mohammad Chowdhury (born 25 October 1952) is a Bangladeshi classical and modern singer.

== Early life ==
Chowdhury was born on 25 October 1952 (13 January; according to certificate) at Khayinakut village at Shibpur Upazila in Narsingdi District of the then East Pakistan (now Bangladesh). He completed his Secondary School Certificate from Nabakumar Institution in 1967 and Higher Secondary School Certificate from Dhaka College in 1969. He graduated from Dhaka University.

Chowdhury received his first training from Ustad Ayatullah Khan at his young age. Later on he was trained by the Ustad Amanat Ali Khan and Ustad Bade Fateh Ali Khan at Patiala gharana.

== Career ==
Chowdhury performed for the first time in 1985 at Bangladesh Television in a live program titled Amar joto gaan by Abu Hena Mustafa Kamal. He performed in Singapore and Malaysia in March 1979. His first song as a playback singer was in the film Gahi Kahi Sangit Kahi directed by Ehtesham.

== Students ==
- Tanzir Tuhin

== Personal life ==
His son's name is Faiyaaz Mohammad Chowdhury and his daughter’s name is Mehnaz Chowdhury Barkha.

== Discography ==
- Jibanananda
- Adhonik Bangla Gaan-1
- Shapane
- Ustad Niaz Mohammad Chowdhury
