= Abdul Waheed Chowdhury =

Bengali military officer

Senior Tiger Abdul Waheed Chowdhury
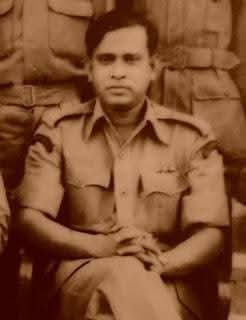
- Officer Commanding 1st East Bengal Regiment
- Born: Abdul Waheed Chowdhury; February 1, 1914; Dariapur, Habiganj, Sylhet
- Died: February 18, 1965 (aged 51); Dhaka
- Burial place: Mariam Saleha Mosque Cemetery, Babupura, Dhaka
- Military career
- Allegiance: (British Raj) British India (until 1947); Pakistan (post-1947)
- Branch: Pakistan Armed Forces
- Service years: British Indian Army (1939-1947); Pakistan Army (1947-1948); East Pakistan Police (1951-1961)
- Rank: Major; Superintendent of Police
- Nickname: A. W. Chowdhury
- Service number: IEC-527
- Unit: East Bengal Regiment
- Commands: 4th Madras Regiment; DAA and QMG of 1st Punjab Regiment,Zhob Brigade HQ; GSO Grade-2 of Supreme Commander's Headquarters (India and Pakistan) Joint Military Council,Dehli; Education & Training Doctrine,GHQ Rawalpindi; Officer Commanding of 1st East Bengal Regiment
- Conflicts: World War II; Indo-Pakistani War of 1947-1948
- Awards: Burma Star; War Medal 1939-45

Major Abdul Waheed Chowdhury (1914–1965), also known as Major A.W. Chowdhury, was a Bengali-British Indian military officer and a decorated second world war veteran who served in both British Indian and Pakistani armies during his military career. During that period he was working at Joint Defense Council of Pakistan and Indian Army's transitional Supreme Commanders Headquarters in Delhi where he played a crucial role in formulating the Pakistan Army training and education doctrine and was instrumental in establishing the East Bengal Regiment.

== Early life and education ==
Major Chowdhury was born on 1 February 1914, in to House of Dariapur ofHabiganj District, Sylhet Division. His father, Khan Sahib Abdur Rab Chowdhury, was the controller of examinations at Dhaka University. Major Chowdhury completed his matriculation in 1931 from the Nabakumar Institution in Dhaka and later passed the intermediate examination from Dhaka College in 1933. He obtained a B.A. (Honors) in economics from Dhaka University in 1935 and completed his master's degree in 1937.

== Career ==
Major A W Chowdhury joined the British Indian Army and he received training at the British Indian Military Academy, Dehradun. As World War II broke out, he was commissioned as a Second Lieutenant in the 4th Madras Regiment ( now Punjab Regiment Pakistan) of the British Indian Army on 15 May 1941. During the war, he served under General Sir Edward Quinan in the British 10th Army stationed in Basra , Sub-Area HQ, Iraq involved in Anglo-Soviet invasion of Persia. After its dissolution he joined the British 12th Army's Sub-Area HQ in Ceylon (now Sri Lanka) involved in Burma Campaign and, after its dissolution, served with the 1st Punjab Regiment , Zhob Brigade HQ as Brigade DAA & QMG in Multan. under Brigadier Malik Mohammad Munir Khan Tiwana.

Regimental Flag of East Bengal Regiment

During the partition while he was serving in the Supreme Commanders Headquarters Joint Defence Council in Delhi at the Infantry Directorate, Pakistan Cell, he played a crucial role in formulating the Pakistan Army and he was instrumental in the creation of East Bengal Regiment. He was then transferred to Rawalpindi GHQ Pakistan Army where he was involved in formulating Pakistan's military training doctrine. During the Indo-Pakistani War of 1947-1948, he was entrusted with the formation of the East Bengal Regiment, laying the foundation for the Senior Tigers. In November 1947, Major A. W. Chowdhury raised the proposal to Field Marshal Claude Auchinleck of the necessity for a Bengali infantry regiment for East Bengal. As a result, the East Bengal Regiment was given approval by Joint Defence Council and Supreme Commander Field Marshal Claude Achinlek. Head of State & Government of Pakistan Governor General Muhammad Ali Jinnah inaugurated East Bengal Regiments, raising sermons on 15 February 1948. Major Abdul Waheed Chowdhury was the first to command, raise and see its initial training. The Bengalis all across the defence forces of Pakistan faced discrimination in the centre from West Pakistani Army officers to the chagrin of ethnic Bengali Army officers. Later he served in East Pakistan Police from 1952 to 1962 as Superintendent of Police in Dhaka and Chittagong and Rajshahi District.

== Later life ==
After his glorious military career in WWII British Indian Army and pioneering role in Pakistan Army he was victimized of discrimination in Pakistan Army by West Pakistani Army Officers he was forced to leave the Army and joined East Pakistan Police Force in 1951 till 1962 he was in served there as Superintendent of Police.

== Death ==
Major A W Chowdhury died on 18 February 1965, at his residence on Nazimuddin Road, Dhaka, at the age of 51. He was interred at the Mariam Saleha Mosque graveyard in Babupura, Dhaka.
