= Supreme Headquarters =

Supreme Headquarters is used by some nations and alliances to refer to the physical location of their high command.

== Europe ==
- Supreme Headquarters (Yugoslav Partisans), the headquarters of the Communist Yugoslavian Partisans
- Supreme Headquarters Allied Expeditionary Force, the headquarters of the Commander of Allied forces in north-west Europe
- Supreme Headquarters Allied Powers Europe, the headquarters of the North Atlantic Treaty Organization
- Supreme Commander's Headquarters (India and Pakistan), transitional British military authority during the partition of India

== Fiction ==
- Supreme Headquarters, International Espionage and Law-Enforcement Division (S.H.I.E.L.D), in Marvel Comics
