= Rabiul Awal Kiran Khan =

Bangladeshi politician

- রবিউল আওয়াল কিরণ খাঁ

Member of 1st Jatiya Sangsad
- In office 7 March 1973 – 6 November 1976
- Constituency: Dhaka-23

Personal details
- Born: Majlispur, Narsingdi, Dacca district, Bengal Province
- Died: 28 April 1986 (aged 45–46); Shibpur Upazila, Narsingdi District, Bangladesh
- Political party: Awami League
- Education: Chandpur Government College

Rabiul Awal Kiran Khan (Bengali: রবিউল আওয়াল কিরণ খাঁ; 1940 – 28 April 1986) is a Awami League politician in Bangladesh and a former member of parliament for Dhaka-23.

== Early life and education ==
Khan was born in c. 1940 to a Bengali family of Muslim Khans in the village of Majlispur in Narsingdi, Dacca district, Bengal Province. He passed his matriculation from Shibpur Pilot High School in 1961. He then studied at the Chandpur Government College.

== Career ==
Khan's entrance to politics began with his position as the Vice President of the Chandpur Government College Students Council. He served as a member of the Awami Jubo League's central committee. Khan has also served as the vice-president of Narsingdi District Awami League. During the 1969 East Pakistan mass uprising, he was arrested for his leadership in the Chhatra Sangram Parishad. Khan participated in the Six point movement and Bangladesh Liberation War. During the war, he visited India and was appointed in charge of the Boromara Freedom Fighters' Camp in Agartala, Tripura. He was later made the BLF commander for Chandpur subdivision.

After the independence of Bangladesh, Kiran was elected to the first Jatiya Sangsad from Dhaka-23 as an Awami League candidate in 1973. He contested for the Narsingdi-3 constituency at the 1986 Bangladeshi general election but was unsuccessful.

== Death ==
On 28 April 1986, Kiran was shot and killed by a relative. On 10 May 2014, one person was sentenced to death for his murder but the convict had died before the verdict was declared.
