= A. K. M. Miraj Uddin =

Bangladeshi athlete and freedom fighter

- এ কে এম মিরাজ উদ্দিন
- Born: 11 March 1948; Vatikanda, Harirampur, East Pakistan
- Disappeared: 8 December 1971 (aged 23); Old Dhaka Central Jail, Dhaka, Bangladesh
- Status: Missing for 54 years, 7 months and 13 days
- Other name: Alok
- Education: Nabakumar Institution; Jagannath College; Dhaka University
- Occupations: Athlete; student
- Years active: 1963–1970
- Known for: Athletics, freedom fighter
- Sports career
- Sport: Hurdling, pole vault and long jump
Medal record
National Inter-School Sports Competition
Representing Nabakumar Institution
Gold medal – first place	1963	Hurdling
Gold medal – first place	1963	Pole vault
Gold medal – first place	1963	Long jump
Pakistan provincial sports competition
Representing East Pakistan
Gold medal – first place	1964 Lahore	Hurdling
Gold medal – first place	1964 Lahore	Pole vault
Gold medal – first place	1964 Lahore	Long jump
Inter-college sports competition
Representing Jagannath College
Gold medal – first place	1965	Hurdling
Gold medal – first place	1965	Pole vault
Gold medal – first place	1965	Long jump
10th Pakistan National Games
Representing East Pakistan
Gold medal – first place	1966 Lahore	Pole vault
Inter-University Sport Competition
Representing Dhaka University
Gold medal – first place	1970	Hurdling
Gold medal – first place	1970	Pole vault
Gold medal – first place	1970	Long jump
- Updated on 2020-11-20

A. K. M. Miraj Uddin (born 11 March 1948 – disappeared 8 December 1971) was a Bangladeshi athlete, politician and a freedom fighter. As an athlete, he achieved success in hurdling, pole vault and long jump in primary and secondary school. He also competed in Pakistani national sporting events from 1963 to 1970, setting multiple records. He is considered one of the best athletes of Bangladesh's pre-independence era. He fought in various battlefields of Manikganj as an active freedom fighter in Bangladesh Liberation War. He was captured by the Pakistani army during the war and later went missing. The Shaheed Miraj–Tapan Stadium in Manikganj was named in honour of him and another martyred freedom fighter Tapan Chowdhury.

== Early life and education ==
Miraj Uddin was born on 11 March 1948 in the village of Vatikanda in the Ramkrishnapur Union of Harirampur Upazila in East Pakistan. He is the eldest son of Sharif Uddin Ahmed and Mosammat Hajera Khatun. He completed his formal education from primary to eighth class in Harirampur. He passed primary from Leshraganj Primary School in Harirampur and eighth grade from Patgram Onathbandhu School. He completed his secondary at Nabakumar Institute in Dhaka and his higher secondary at Jagannath College. At the undergraduate level, he was a student of social sciences at Dhaka University.

== Athletics career (1963–1970) ==
If this boy gets a fiber pole, he will be able to break the record of the Asian Games.

— Hoffmann, Pakistan national athletics coach, commented after seeing Miraj setting a record with a bamboo pole at the Polevolt event in 1966

Miraj Uddin's athletics career started in 1963. That year, he won national-level pole vault, hurdles and long jump events at the inter-school sports competition. He achieved this feat in the 1964 Pakistan Provincial Sports Competition in Lahore, where he also won the individual title. In 1965, he set a new national record for 110 m hurdles, pole vault and long jump on behalf of Jagannath College in the intercollegiate sports competition. He set a Pakistan national record by crossing a height of 12 feet 2 inches with a bamboo pole, instead of fiberglass or carbon fiber pole in a pole vault event at the 10th Pakistan Games (known as the 'Pakistan Olympic') in Lahore in 1966. In that competition, he was the only gold medalist among the Bengali players of East Pakistan at that time. His successes continued into university life in the areas of pole vault, hurdles and long jump events. He was the first to win a personal title in the inter-university sports competition in 1970. In the same year, he led a parade bearing the flag of the East Pakistan Sports Team at the 12th Pakistan National Games at the Karachi Hockey Club Ground. Due to his success in athletics, he was selected as a member of the Pakistan team for the 1972 Munich Olympics.

== Political career (1970) ==
Miraj Uddin studied social sciences at Dhaka University from 1969; he was the second year in 1970. At that time he was elected Sports Secretary of Haji Muhammad Muhsin Hall student council on behalf of Bangladesh Chhatra League.

== Participation in the War of Liberation (1971) ==
Miraj Uddin returned to his village Vatikanda, after Operation Searchlight took place in Dhaka. In the first week of April 1971, along with his younger brother AKM Siraj Uddin, the freedom fighter organizer of Manikganj, led by former Captain Abdul Halim Chowdhury, joined the war of liberation and took part in the front line as a guerrilla. One of the battles he took part in was the Golaidanga battle in Singair upazila. He fought in the battle of Golaidanga on 26 October under the leadership of Tabarak Hossain Ludu. 81 Pakistani soldiers were killed in this battle. On 2 November, he was caught by the Pakistan army while planting dynamite on the Baniajuri bridge on the Dhaka-Aricha highway.

The Pakistani army did not leave him in the Manikganj prison camp but sent him to Dhaka Cantonment. He was later sent to Dhaka Central Jail.

== Disappearance ==
On the morning of 6 December 1971, Major Mostaq, the director of Al-Badr forces, released Miraj from Dhaka Central Jail and took him in a jeep. He has been missing since then.

== Honours and recognition ==
After Bangladesh gained independence, the Manikganj District Stadium was named the Shaheed Miraj–Tapan Stadium after him and another martyred freedom fighter Tapan Chowdhury.

== See also ==
- List of people who disappeared
