= Murtaja Baseer =

Bangladeshi painter and artist (1932–2020)

- মুর্তজা বশীর
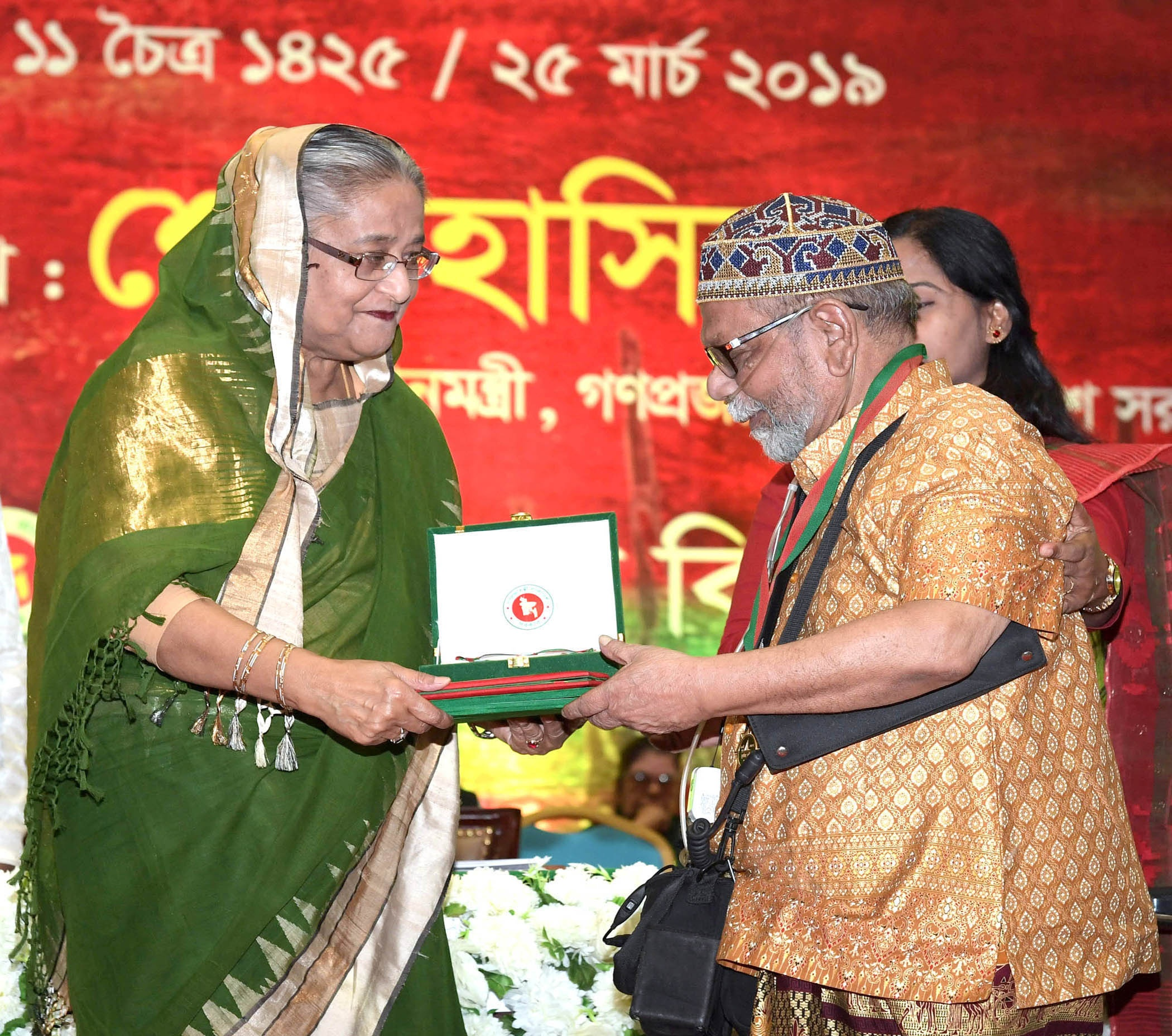
- Baseer (right) receives Independence Award in 2019.
- Born: 17 August 1932; Dhaka, Bengal Presidency, British India
- Died: 15 August 2020 (aged 87); Dhaka, Bangladesh
- Resting place: Banani Graveyard
- Education: University of Dhaka; Academy of Fine Arts of Florence; École nationale supérieure des Beaux-Arts
- Occupation: Painter
- Father: Muhammad Shahidullah
- Relatives: Muhammad Takiullah (brother)
- Awards: full list

Murtaja Baseer (17 August 1932 – 15 August 2020) was a Bangladeshi painter and artist known for his abstract realism themed works. He was also a poet, author, researcher, numismatist, and filmmaker. Baseer was awarded the Ekushey Padak, Bangladesh's second highest civilian honor, in 1980, and the Independence Award, Bangladesh's highest state award, in 2019.

== Early life and education ==
Baseer was born to Muhammad Shahidullah and Marguba Khatun. His father, Shahidullah was a scholar and a linguist.

Baseer enrolled in Dacca Art College (now the Faculty of Fine Arts, University of Dhaka) in 1949. After graduating in 1954, he studied at the Academy of Fine Arts of Florence from 1956 to 1958. He also studied mosaic and etching at École nationale supérieure des Beaux-Arts (ENSBA) in Paris from 1971 to 1973.

== Career ==
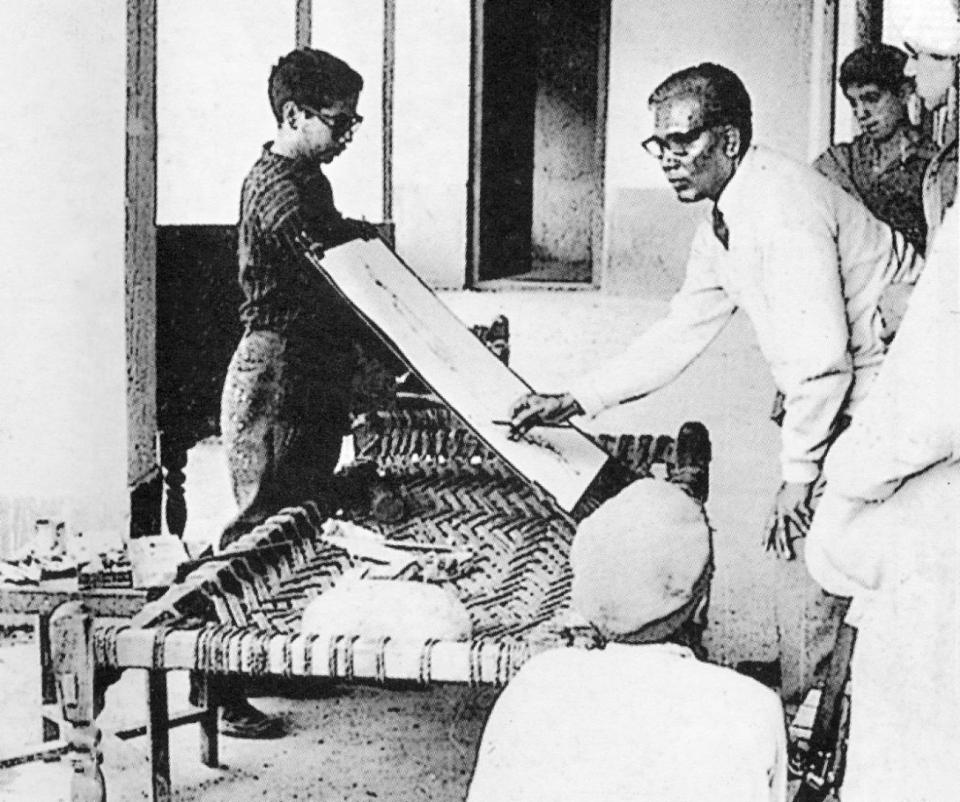
Baseer with Zainul Abedin in 1962

Baseer joined University of Chittagong as an assistant professor of fine arts, upon his return from France in 1973, and served until his retirement, as a professor of fine arts, in 1998. He was active in leftist politics during the 1950s and was also sent to prison prior to Bangladesh's liberation.

== Paintings ==
As an acclaimed painter, Baseer's working style was said to have evolved from realism and semi-realism in his early days to abstract realism. His paintings were considered a critical commentary on society. His style of using detailed lines and balanced colors have been considered a critical commentary on society. His portrayal of Bangladeshi women in his paintings is believed to reflect their individuality and strong personality.

Peace is a recurring motif in his paintings with his collage "No More War" being considered his expression against the Iraq war, and his collage "Statue of Liberty" depicting the impact of war on women and children having to flee their home.

Some of his early influences in the 1950s included the Indian painters Paritosh Sen (minimalism), and Dilip Das Gupta (mixing water colors), as well as Renaissance painters from the 13th and 14th centuries (absence of perspectives or shades of light).

In 1971, Baseer moved to Paris with his family, fearing arrest in Bangladesh (then East Pakistan) for his involvement in the liberation movement. His "Epitaph for the Martyrs" series was painted at this time, with stylization inspired by Parisian streets as a sombre background for the martyrs.

In 1987, he received a fellowship from British Council to carry out research on folk and traditional art of Bangladesh. In 1988, he visited several museums in Delhi, Calcutta, Banaras and 3000 villages under nine districts of West Bengal — under the fellowship of Indian Council for Cultural Relations (ICCR).

Some of his famous paintings include Somnambular Ballad, The Gypsy, Man with Accordion, Girl with Flower. Epitaph for the Martyrs, No More War, Statue of Liberty, the Wall series, and the Jyoti series. A watercolor portrait by Baseer is also an exhibit at the Louvre museum, in Paris, France. His paintings have been exhibited in Bangladesh, Pakistan, America, Europe, and the erstwhile Soviet Union.

== Author and filmmaker ==
Baseer has written several novels including Ultramarine (1954), Kanch-er Pakhir Gaan (1969), Mitar Shangey Char Shandha and Amitakkhar. He was a regular contributor to now defunct literary journals like Dilruba, Samakal, and Saogat. His first published poem was Parbe Na. In 1964, he was the screenwriter, art director, and chief assistant director on the 1965 Bengali film Nadi O Nari (The River and the Women). He was also art director for the 1965 Urdu film Kaise Kahoon.

His work Mudra O Shilalipir Aloke Banglar Habshi Sultan O Tothkalin Samaj was published in 2004. Several articles by Baseer have also been published in the Journal of the Numismatic Society of India.

== Death ==
Baseer died from an infection with COVID-19 in Dhaka on 15 August 2020, at the age of 87, during the COVID-19 pandemic in Bangladesh, two days before his 88th birthday. He had sought treatment at Evercare Hospital. After Baseer died, he was interred at Banani graveyard, next to his wife, Amina Baseer.

== Awards ==
- Prix National, Festival of Paintings, Cagnes-sur Mer, France (1973)
- Academy Award by Bangladesh Shilpakala Academy (1975)
- Best Cover Design, National Book Centre, Dhaka (1976)
- Ekushey Padak (1980)
- Sultan Padak, Narail (2003)
- Star Lifetime Award (2016)
- Independence Day Award (2019)
