= Amanullah Asaduzzaman =

20th-century Bengali student activist

- আমানুল্লাহ মোহাম্মদ আসাদুজ্জামান
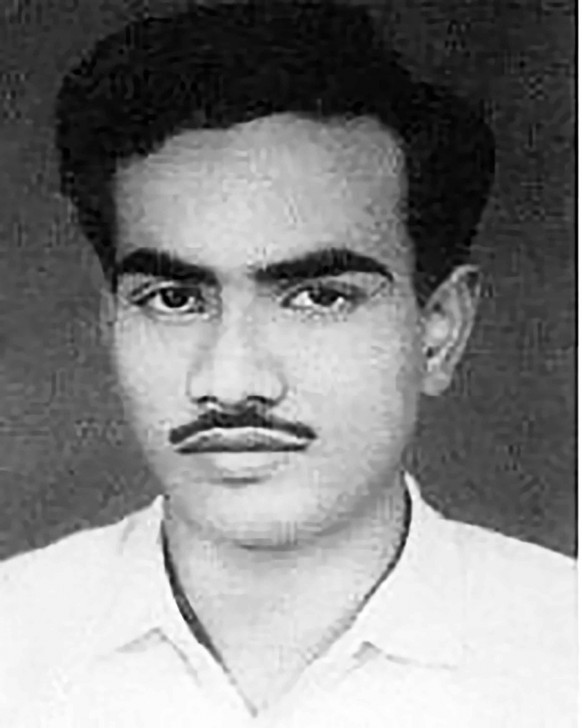
- Born: 10 June 1942; Shibpur, Narsingdi District, Bengal Presidency, British India
- Died: 20 January 1969 (aged 26); Dhaka, East Pakistan, Pakistan
- Cause of death: Gunshot wound
- Education: Jagannath College; Murari Chand College; Dacca University
- Known for: Democratic political movement of 1969
- Awards: Independence Day Award (2018)

Amanullah Mohammad Asaduzzaman (known as Asad; 10 June 1942 – 20 January 1969) was an East Pakistani student activist whose death at the hands of police during a protest on 20 January 1969 "changed the nature of the student-mass movement and ... turned into a mass-upsurge against the Ayub regime and its repressive measures", according to Banglapedia. The Daily Star reports him as one of three martyrs of the 1969 uprising in East Pakistan which "set the stage for the liberation war". He was awarded the Independence Day Award in 2018 posthumously by the Government of Bangladesh.

== Early life ==
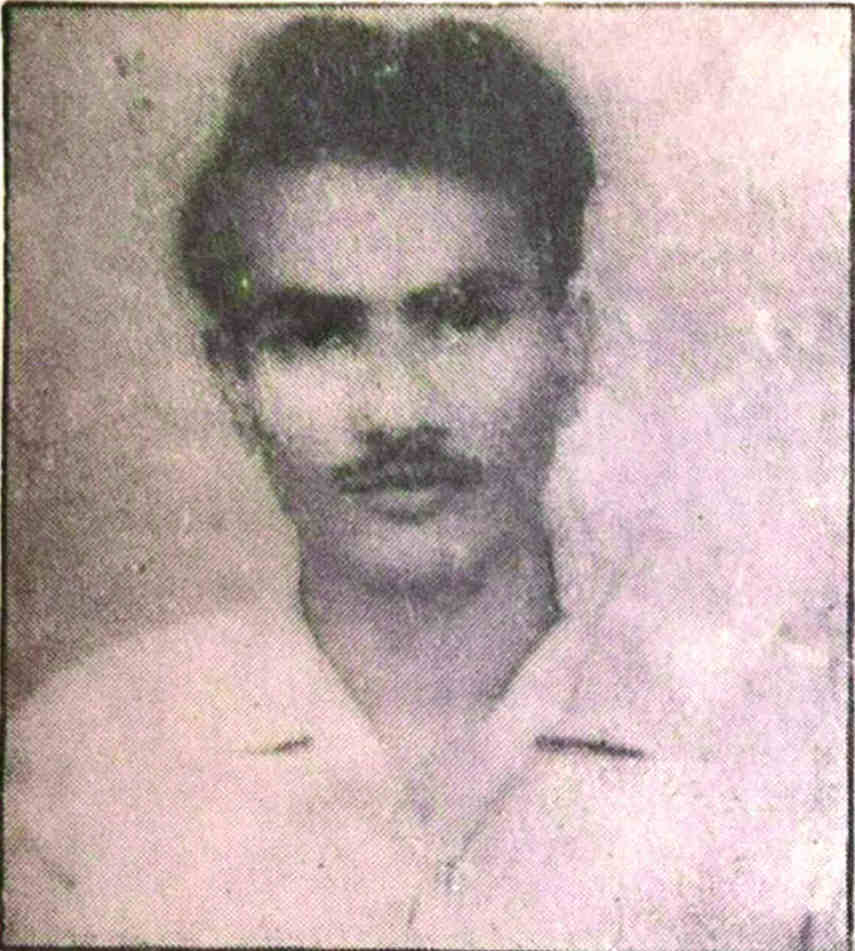
Asad's photograph in his University of Dhaka identification card (1966)

Born in Shibpur, Asad graduated from Shibpur High School in 1960 and subsequently studied at Jagannath University (then known as Jagannath College) and Murari Chand College. After passing the latter in 1963, he entered the University of Dhaka, receiving bachelor's in 1966 and master's in 1967. In that year, he organised the Krishak Samity in Shibpur, Monohardi, Raipura and Narsingdi areas at the direction of Maulana Abdul Hamid Khan Bhashani, President of National Awami Party and Krishak Samity.

After studying at City Law College in Dhaka, Asad sat in 1968 for a second M.A. exam in an effort to receive a better result. At the time of his death in 1969, he was in the final year of his M.A. at Dhaka University's Department of History. He was the president of the Dhaka Hall unit of East Pakistan Students Union and General Secretary of the Dhaka branch of what was at the time the East Pakistan Students Union (EPSU, Menon group).

In his political activities, Asad was interested in the educational rights of the poor and powerless. He founded a night school named Shibpur Naisha Biddalaya and collected funds for setting up a college (Shibpur College) for local people.

== 20 January 1969 ==
=== Background ===
The catalyst for the events leading to Asad's death include the Six point movement of Sheikh Mujibur Rahman and the Agartala Conspiracy Case at which Rahman and dozens of others were charged with sedition by the Government of Pakistan. Student groups were already experiencing considerable unrest when, in December 1968, Maulana Abdul Hamid Khan Bhashani organised a march against the Governors House, in conjunction with several labour associations arranged a Repression Resistance Day on 6 December 1968, and proclaimed a hartal against merchants. On 4 January 1969, an 11-point programme—an expansion of Rahman's six-point movement—was publicised by a coalition of student group leaders, including the group for which Asad served as an officer. In a meeting at Dhaka University on 17 January 1969, student protestors decided to unite all campuses of East Pakistan on 20 January 1969, in strike. Governor Monem Khan sought to prevent the action by imposing Section 144 on the students, under which no more than four persons were permitted to assemble.

=== Procession and death ===
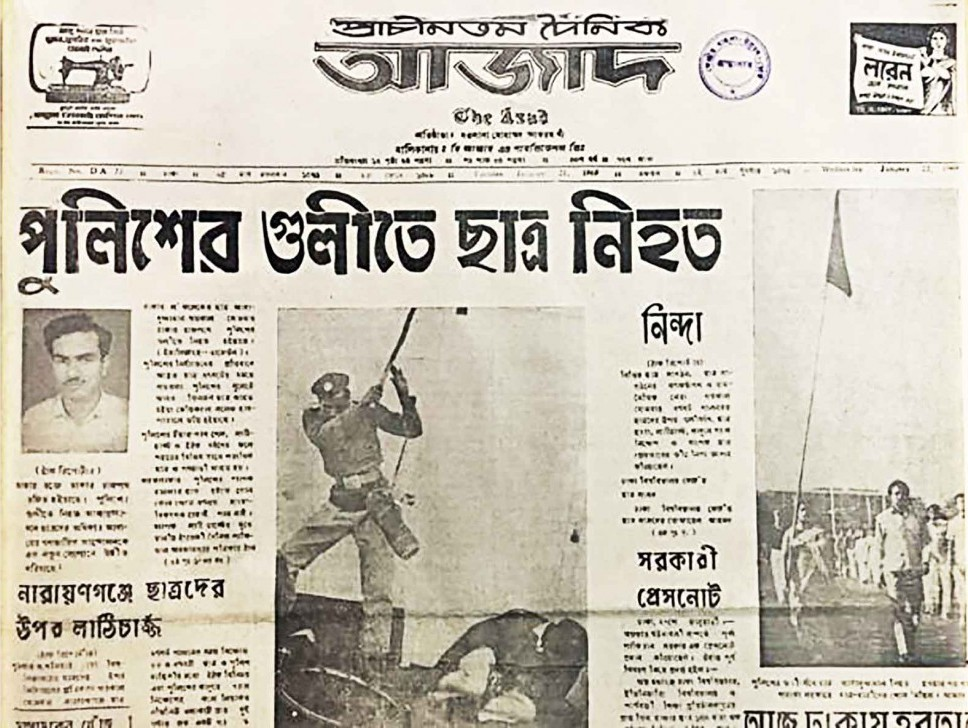
Asad's death reported in The Azad newspaper titled "Student shot dead by police" on 21 January 1969

At around noon on 20 January 1969, the students enacted their planned protest, with a procession in front of Dhaka Medical College Hospital heading towards Chan Khar Pool. Police charged near Chand Khan's bridge, but the protestors resisted. About an hour into the conflict, Asad and other student leaders tried to continue the procession. Asad was shot from very close range by a DSP of police named Bahauddin. Seriously injured, he was admitted to the hospital, where he was declared dead.

== Aftermath ==
Thousands of students and common people mourned Asad together in procession, carrying his blood-stained shirt to Shaheed Minar. The Central Action Committee announced the 22, 23 and 24 January as a "mourning-period" for him, also striking on those days. On the final day, police once again opened fire. As a result, the administration of Field Marshal Ayub Khan was forced to terminate within two months from the day Asad died.

== Personal life ==
Asad had a sister, Anwara Ferdousi. His brothers were — HM Muniruzzaman, a history professor and FM Rashiduzzaman, a project engineer of Bangladesh's national parliament building.

== Legacy ==
Poet Shamsur Rahman wrote a poem Asader Shirt (Asad's Shirt) in his fifth book Nij Basbhumay (In My Own Land] depicting Asad's blood-soaked shirt during his death.

In many places of the country, people replaced the nameplates of Ayub Khan with the name of Shaheed Asad. In time, Ayub Gate was renamed Asad Gate, Ayub Avenue as Asad Avenue and Ayub Park as Asad Park.

Shaheed Asad Day is observed on 20 January each year in recognition of Asad's sacrifice, which led the nation towards mass upsurge and independence.

In 1970, on the first Asad Day, people constructed a monument, Unsatturer Gono-aubyuthaner Swarak O Aumor Asad, at the point in front of the central gate of Dhaka Medical College Hospital where Asad was shot dead. The local people of Shibpur and Dhanua established Shibpur Shaheed Asad College in 1970. In 1991, the inhabitants of Asad's own village Dhauna founded Shaheed Asad Collegiate Girls School and College.
