= Indra Mohan Rajbongshi =

Bangladeshi singer (1946–2021)

Indra Mohan Rajbongshi ইন্দ্র মোহন রাজবংশী
- Born: 26 January 1946; Dhaka, Bengal Presidency, British India
- Died: 7 April 2021 (aged 75) Dhaka, Bangladesh
- Genres: Folk

Indra Mohan Rajbongshi (26 January 1946 – 7 April 2021) was a Bangladeshi folk singer. He was the recipient of 2018 Ekushey Padak by the Government of Bangladesh.

== Biography ==
=== Early life ===
In the early 1950s, Rajbongshi learnt music from his grandfather, Krishna Das Rajbongshi. He was involved with Jatra, Palagaan, Nazrul Sangeet and folk songs. He was admitted to the Bulbul Lalitakala Academy in Nazrul song in the late 1960s and completed the five-year course. In 1963, he started to learn folk songs under Hafizur Rahman. He joined the Government College of Music in 1974.

=== Career ===
In 1971, Rajbongshi took part in Swadhin Bangla Betar Kendra.

In 1998, Rajbongshi established a folk organisation, Bangladesh Lok Sangeet Parishad (Folk Song Council). It works to practice, preserve, promote and do research on folk songs. He wrote about 100 folk songs for children, including songs on our liberation war and language movement.

Rajbongshi received his Certificate of World Master from Kim Sung Oak, chairperson of The Association of World Masters for the Exchange of Arts and Culture.

=== Death ===
Rajbongshi died on 7 April 2021 after catching COVID-19 at a hospital in Dhaka.

Rajbongshi is survived by his wife, folk singer Deepti Rajbongshi, daughter Sangita Rajbongshi Das, and son Dipankar Rajbongshi.

== Works ==
Music albums

As of 2014, Rajbongshi had released nine albums.

- Sardhoshoto Jonmotshob-e Shrodhanjali (2012)
- Dersho Bochhor Agey (2012)

Books

- On life and work of Abbas Uddin
