= M Abdul Mazid =

Agricultural researcher

- মো. আব্দুল মজিদ
- Known for: Researcher
- Awards: Independence Day Award, (2018)

M Abdul Mazid is an agriculture researcher in Bangladesh who specializes in rice. He received the Independence Day Award in 2018 for his special contribution to food security in Bangladesh.

== Career ==
Mazid has worked with rice research at the International Rice Research Institute and is credited with reducing the effects of Monga, a famine like condition in Northern Bangladesh.
