= Mritunjoyi Mujib =

Mural in Bangladesh

- মৃত্যুঞ্জয়ী মুজিব
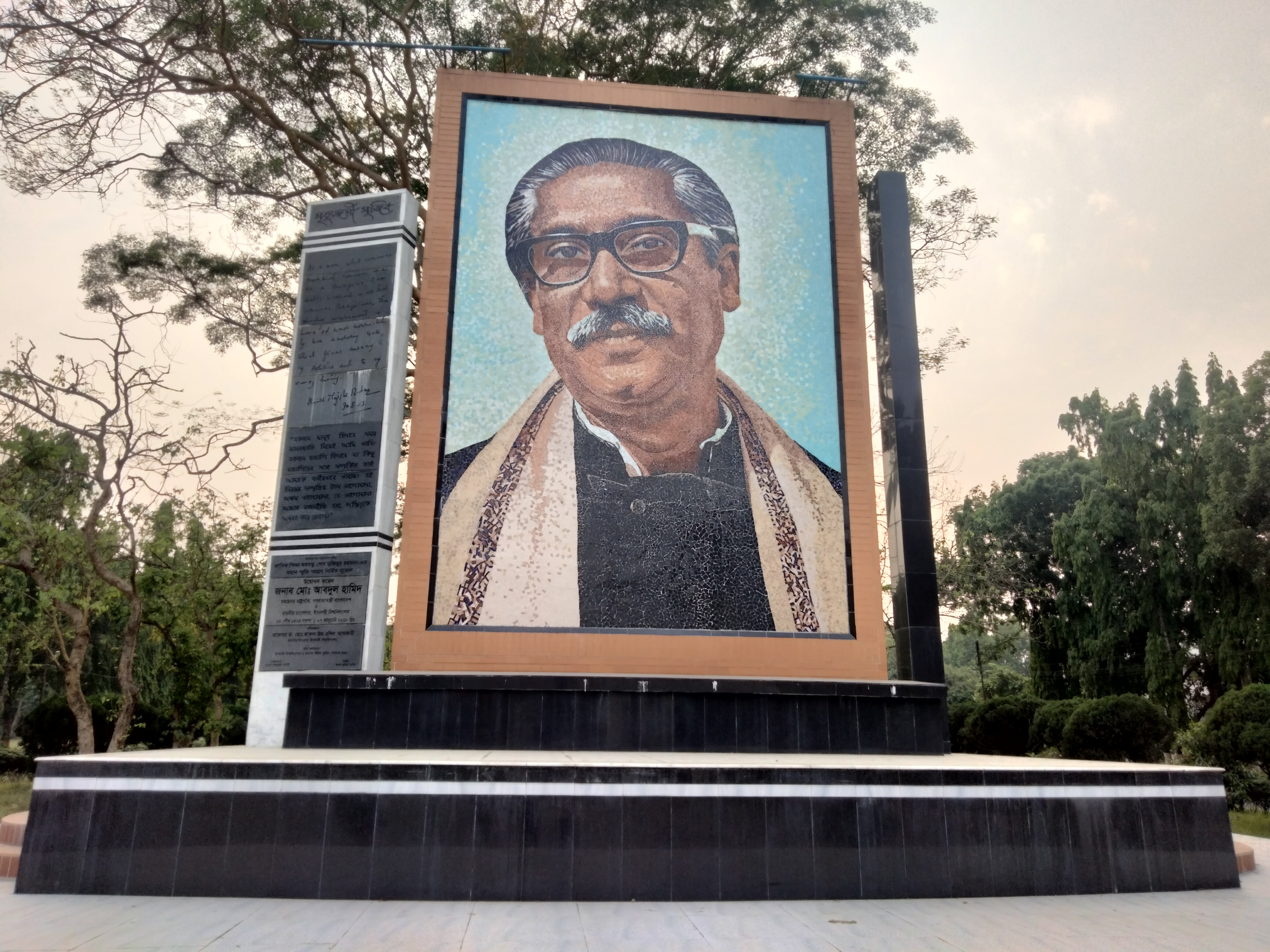
- The mural in 2021
- Interactive map of Mritunjoyi Mujib
- Location: Islamic University, Bangladesh
- Coordinates: 23.722750°N 89.153417°E
- Designer: Kanak Kumar Pathak
- Type: Mural
- Opening date: 7 January 2018
- Dedicated to: Sheikh Mujibur Rahman

Mritunjoyi Mujib (Bengali: মৃত্যুঞ্জয়ী মুজিব, lit. 'Immortal Mujib'), was a mural created in 2018 by Kanak Kumar Pathak. It was located on the campus area of the Islamic University, Bangladesh. It was a mural or portrait wall painting commemorating Sheikh Mujibur Rahman, the first president of Bangladesh.

In 2020, the phrase Mrityunjoyi Mujib, the name of this mural, was at the top of the ranking in the searches of Google from Bangladesh. It was a tourist spots of Kushtia District, the district the campus of the university located. It was the largest memorial mural dedicated to Sheikh Mujibur Rahman in the public universities and the second largest in all of the country.

It was demolished after the Student–People's uprising in August 2024.

== Location ==
Mrityunjoyi Mujib was located at the entrance through the main gate of the campus of the university in Kushtia district. Entering through the main gate, the Mukto Bangla sculpture was on the mural's right side and the university's Martyrs Memorial was on the left side. The mural was flanked by an internal street to the university, and behind the mural is the university's Diana square. The location of Mrityunjai Mujib mural was 23.43219°N 89.09123°E as per geographical coordinate system.

== History ==
Rashid Askari planned to build a mural of Sheikh Mujibur Rahman in the campus of Islamic University, at the time he was the vice-chancellor of the university. The university authority and a ex-student named Jalal Uddin Tuhin jointly funded its construction. ৳37 lakh were spent to build the mural. With the design of Alimuzzaman Tutul, the then Acting Chief Engineer of Islamic University and the artistic craftsmanship of Kanak Kumar Pathak, who was an assistant professor of the department of Pottery and Sculpture, Rajshahi University, the construction was completed. The mural was inaugurated by former president Abdul Hamid on 7 January 2018.

== Subject and composition ==
The length of Mrityunjoyi Mujib's main structure including stairs is 50 feet and width is 38 feet and it had a 5 feet high altar. Its altar includes the portrait of Sheikh Mujibur Rahman which is 26 feet in height and 17 feet in width. The original portrait is made of rods and cement. It had three staircases leading up to the main altar and an additional 15-foot-wide space for movement on three sides of the structure.

On the right side of Sheikh Mujibur Rahman's original portrait, there is a 4-foot-wide and 20-foot-high wall. The mural is made of carved stones and tiles, installed in the whole area of the mural structure with its altar. An English message signed by Sheikh Mujibur Rahman was recorded on the wall with its translation in Bengali.

As a man, what concerns mankind concerns me. As a Bengali, I am deeply involved in all that concerns Bengalis. This abiding involvement is born of and nourished by love, enduring love, which gives meaning to my politics and my very being.

— Sheikh Mujibur Rahman

According to the university administration, the construction of this sculpture would increase the progressiveness among the students. And this sculpture would play a role in transmitting the ideals of the founding president among the students who come from recent generations. It would inculcate non-communal spirit among all the students. The university administration used to paid homage to this mural on various national occasions of the country.

Also, this establishment was used for various functions of the university. University internal functions are often held here, students sat here in their free time to chat and gossiping. It was one of the tourist spots in Kushtia District and Jhenaidah District.
