= Muhammad Shahidullah =

Bengali linguist (1885–1969)

- মুহম্মদ শহীদুল্লাহ
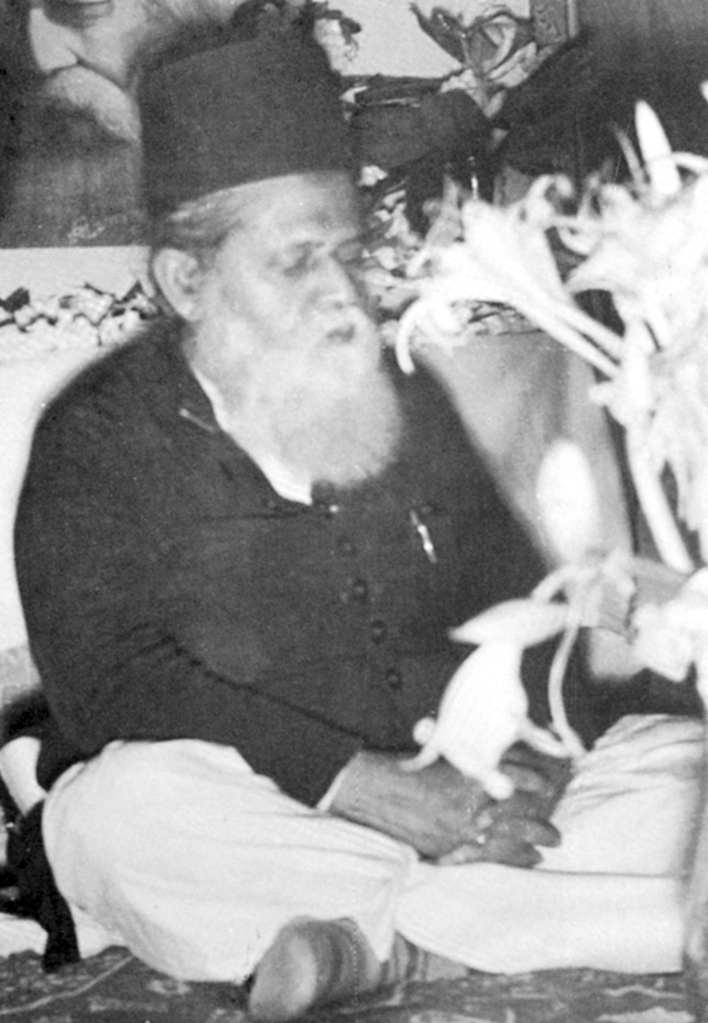
- Shahidullah in a literary conference in Curzon Hall, Dacca in April 1954
- Pronunciation: [muɦɔmːɔd̪ ʃoɦid̪ulːaʱ]
- Born: 10 July 1885; Peyara, Basirhat, 24 Pargana, Bengal Presidency, British India (now West Bengal, India)
- Died: 13 July 1969 (aged 84); Dacca, East Pakistan, Pakistan (now Bangladesh)
- Resting place: University of Dhaka Graveyard
- Citizenship: British Indian (1885–1947); Pakistani (1947–1969)
- Occupations: Linguist; philologist; academic; researcher; writer; educationalist
- Years active: 1908–1969
- Works: Bibliography
- Movement: Bengali language movement
- Spouse: Marguba Khatun
- Children: 9, including Muhammad Takiullah and Murtaja Baseer
- Father: Mafizuddin Ahmad
- Awards: Pride of Performance (1958); Chevalier de l'Ordre des Arts et des Lettres (1967); Independence Award (1980, posthumously)
- Writing career
- Language: Bengali; French; English
- Period: Contemporary
- Genres: Fiction, non-fiction, translation
- Notable works: Bangala Byakaran, Bangala Bhashar Itibritta, Les chants mystiques de Kāṇha et de Saraha
- Awards: Full list

Academic background
- Education: City College, Calcutta (BA, 1910); University of Calcutta (MA, 1912; BL, 1914); University of Paris, (PhD, 1928)
- Thesis: Les chants mystiques de Kāṇha et de Saraha : les Dohā-koṣa (en apabhraṃśa, avec les versions tibétaines) et les Caryā (en vieux-bengali) avec introduction, vocabulaires et notes (1928)

Academic work
- Discipline: Linguistics, philology, multilingual studies, law, literature
- Institutions: Jessore Zilla School (1908–1909); Sitakunda High School (1914–1915); University of Calcutta (1919–1921); University of Dhaka (1921–1926; 1928–1944); University of Rajshahi (1955–1958)

Muhammad Shahidullah (Bengali: মুহম্মদ শহীদুল্লাহ, pronounced [muɦɔmːɔd̪ ʃoɦid̪ulːaʱ]; 10 July 1885 – 13 July 1969) was a Bengali linguist, philologist, educationist, and writer. He played a vital role in Bangladesh's Language movement of 1952. He is primarily credited for being the one to justify why Bengali should be the state language of Pakistan over Urdu.

In 2004, he was ranked number 16 in the BBC's opinion poll Greatest Bengali of all time. According to linguist Pabitra Sarkar, Shahidullah is one of the best scholars of linguistics that South Asia ever produced. A residential hall at Dhaka University has been named after him since 1969.

== Early life and education ==
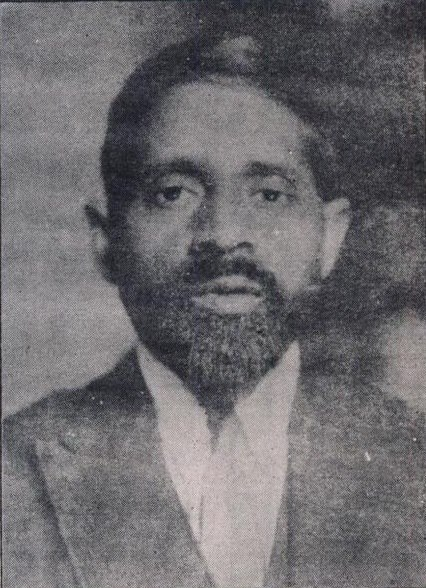
Young Shahidullah

Muhammad Ibrahim was born on 10 July 1885 in the village of Peyara in the erstwhile Bengal Presidency's 24 Parganas district. His mother, Harunnesa, later changed his name to Muhammad Shahidullah. His father, Mafizuddin Ahmed, was a warden of the shrine of Pir Gorachand. Shahidullah was their sixth child. He grew up with three brothers and three sisters.

Shahidullah passed his school final entrance exam in 1904 from Howrah Zilla School. In 1906, he passed the FA exam from Presidency College in Kolkata. He received the Bachelor of Arts degree with Honours in Sanskrit in 1910 from City College, Kolkata, and his Master of Arts degree in 1912 in comparative philology from the University of Calcutta. He earned his PhD degree from Sorbonne University in 1928 for his research on the dialects of the Charyapada. He was the first Bengali Muslim to receive this doctorate degree. He was also a murid (disciple) of Mohammad Abu Bakr Siddique, the inaugural Pir of Furfura, from whom he received mystic education and khilafah (spiritual succession).

== Career ==
Shahidullah began his career by teaching at Jessore Zila School in 1908. After working as the headmaster of Sitakunda High School for some time in 1914, he practiced law at Bashirhat in 24 Parganas. In 1915, he was elected as vice-chairman of the town's municipality.

At the invitation of Sir Ashutosh Mukherjee, he joined the University of Calcutta as Sharatchandra Lahiri Research Fellow (1919–21) under Dinesh Chandra Sen. In 1920, he published "one of his most important papers titled "Outlines of an Historical Grammar of the Bengali Language" in the Journal of the Department of Letters of the University of Calcutta."

In 1921, he joined the University of Dhaka as a lecturer in 1921 in Sanskrit and Bangla. During his period at the University of Dhaka, he did research on the origins of the Bengali language. In 1925, he presented his thesis that Bangla as a language originated from Gaudi or Magadhi Prakrit. He was principal of Bogra Azizul Huq College from 1944 to 1948. He then returned to the University of Dhaka, serving as head of the Bangla Department and dean of the Faculty of Arts. He taught part-time at the Law Department (1922–25) and the International Relations Department as a teacher of French (1953–55). He worked as head of the Bangla and Sanskrit Department of the University of Rajshahi (1955–58).

He served as an editor for the Islami Bishwakosh project for a while.

Muhammad Shahidullah's mastery of different languages was widely regarded as impressive and outstanding. He was fluent in 24 languages and had working knowledge of 18 languages. Some of the notable languages are Bengali, Urdu, Persian, Arabic, English, French, Assamese, Oriya, Maithili, Hindi, Punjabi, Gujarati, Marathi, Kashmiri, Nepali, Sinhala, Tibetan, Sindhi, Sanskrit, Pali, etc.

== Bibliography ==
- Sindabad Saodagarer Galpa (The Stories of the Merchant Sindbad, 1922)
- Bhasa O Sahitya (Language and Literature, essays, 1931)
- Bangala Byakaran (Bangla Grammar, 1936)
- Diwan-i-Hafiz (Poems of Hafiz, translation, 1938)
- Shikwah O Jawab-i-Shikwah (Questions and Their Answers, translation from Iqbal, 1942)
- Rubaiyat-i-Omar Khaiyam (Quatrains of Omar Khayyam, translation, 1942)
- Essays on Islam (1945)
- Amader Samasya (Our Problems, essays, 1949)
- Padmavati (Volume I editor, 1950)
- Bangla Sahityer Katha (History of Bangla Literature, Volume I in 1953, Volume II in 1965)
- Vidyapati Shatak (Collection of Vidyapati's Songs, text analysis, 1954)
- Bangla Adab Ki Tarikh (History of Bangla Literature, essays, in Urdu, 1957)
- Bangla Sahityer Itihas (History of Bangla Literature, 1957)
- Bangala Bhasar Itibritta (History of Bangla Language, 1959)
- Amarkabya (Unforgettable Poetical Works, 1963)
- Sekaler Rupkatha (Fairy Tales of Ancient Time), 1965
- Les Chants Mystiques de Kanha et de Saraha [The Mystic Songs], 1928, Adrien Maisonneuve.

== Family ==
Shahidullah had seven sons and two daughters - Mohammad Raziullah, Mohammad Safiyullah, Mohammad Waliullah, A K Mohammad Zakiyullah, Mohammad Taqiullah, Mohammad Naqiullah, Mohammad Bashirullah, Mohzuza Haque (née Khatun), Masrura Haque (née Khatun). Zakiyullah, established a school named Dr. Shahidullah Gyanpith in Old Dhaka and a research library named Dr. Shahidullah Memorial Library and Language Research Center in Senpara Parbata, Mirpur, Dhaka. Naqiyyullah studied at George Washington University in the United States, and settled in Cairo, Egypt, after serving as a pathologist in Saudi Arabia. Bashirullah, known popularly as Murtaja Baseer, is an Independence Award winning painter.

== Awards and honors ==
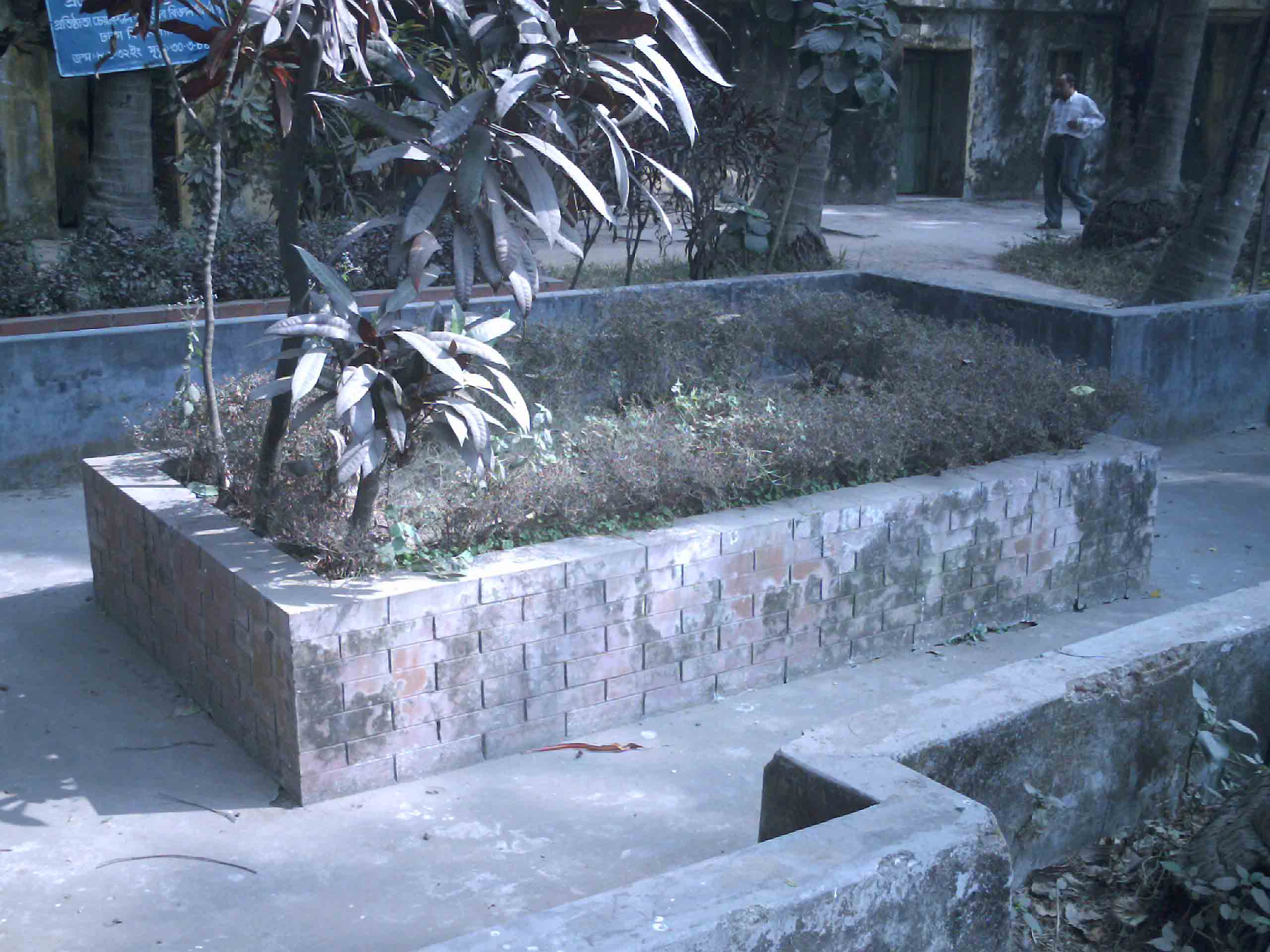
Shahidullah's tomb at the University of Dhaka campus

Shahidullah was made professor emeritus by the University of Dhaka (1967) for his lifetime contribution to research on language and literature. He was also awarded the Chevalier de l'Ordre des Arts et des Lettres by the French government in 1967 for his academic contribution to language and literature. In 1980, the government of Bangladesh awarded him the Independence Award posthumously.

== Eponyms ==
- Dr. Muhammad Shahidullah Hall
- Dr. Muhammad Shahidullah Academic Building, Rajshahi University
- Chandraketugarh Sahidullah Smriti Mahavidyalaya
