= Amzadul Haq =

Bangladeshi diplomat

Amzadul Haq is a Bangladeshi diplomat and recipient of the Independence Award, the highest civilian award in Bangladesh.

== Career ==
At the start of the Bangladesh Liberation War, Amzadul was the assistant press secretary of the High Commission of Pakistan, New Delhi. He defected to the Provisional Government of Bangladesh. He and K.M. Shehabuddin were the first two diplomats of Pakistan to defect to the Bangladesh movement.

In 2018, Haq was awarded the Independence Award for his contribution to the Bangladesh Liberation War.
