= Zulekha Haque =

Prolific Bangladeshi researcher

- জুলেখা হক
- Born: Calcutta, British India
- Died: 8 December 2014
- Spouse: Enamul Haque
- Father: Abu Mohammed Habibullah
- Honours: Ekushey Padak (posthumous)

Professor Zulekha Haque (née Habibullah, died 8 December 2014) was a prolific Bangladeshi researcher of ancient and medieval art of Bengal. She served as the chairperson of the department of history of Eden Mohila College. She co-founded the International Centre for the Study of Bengal Art (ICSBA) in 1995. It has brought out 20 books and annually publishes “Journal of Bengal Art” containing research works on Bengal's diverse art and cultural histories.

Professor Zulekha Haque and her husband, Dr. Enamul Haque, donated their personal collection of 20,000 books and 60,000 photographs to the ICSBA. In 2018, the government of Bangladesh awarded her Ekushey Padak, the country's second highest civilian award.

She is survived by one daughter and one son, as well as three grandchildren.
