= Shibpur Upazila =

Shibpur শিবপুর
- Upazila
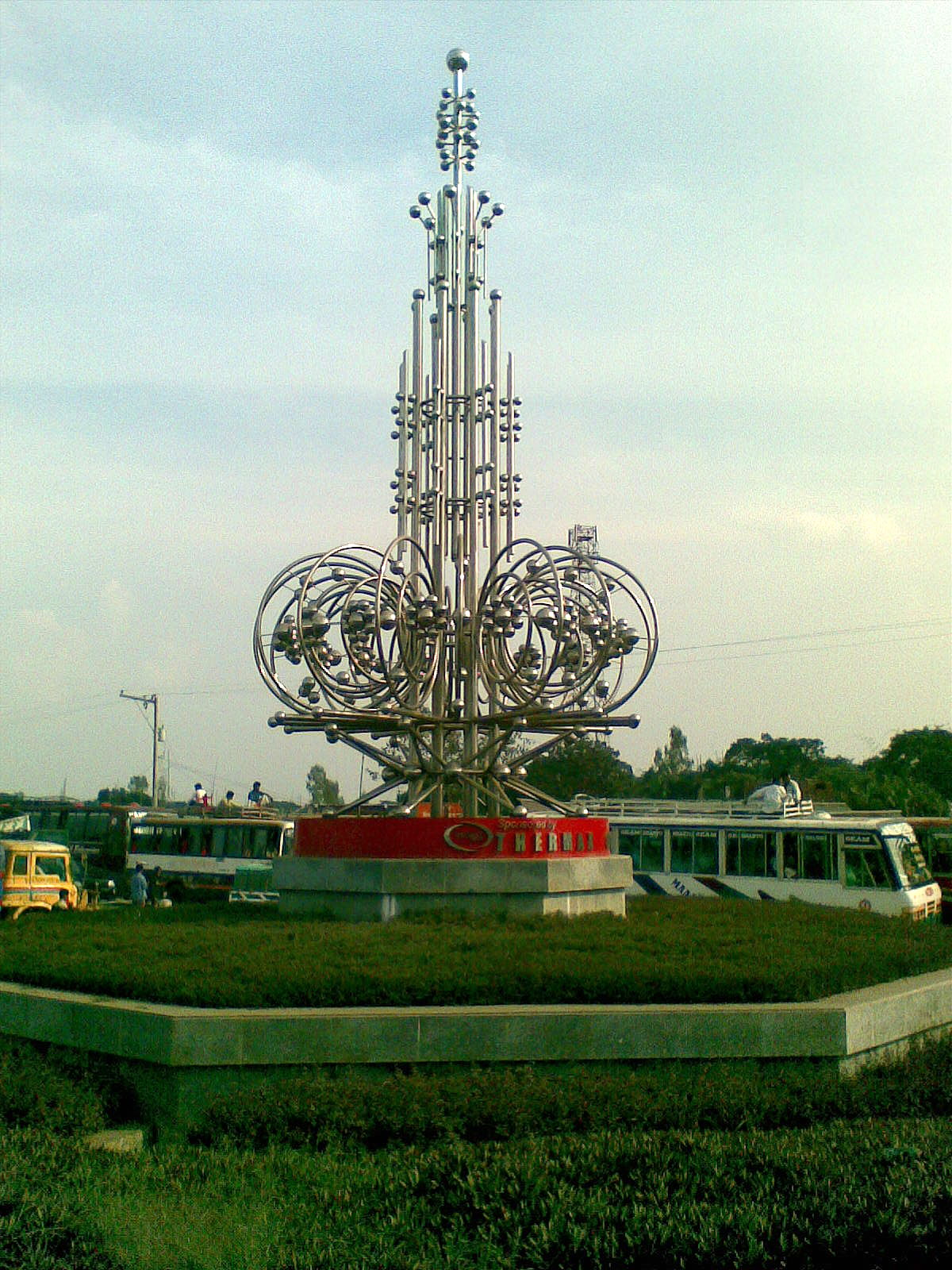
- A sculpture located in the middle of a road in Shibpur, Narsingdi

- Coordinates: 24°22.5′N 90°44.3′E
- Country: Bangladesh
- Division: Dhaka
- District: Narsingdi

Area
  - Total: 217.71 km^{2} (84.06 sq mi)

Population (2022)
  - Total: 360,153
  - Density: 1,654.3/km^{2} (4,284.6/sq mi)
- Time zone: UTC+6 (BST)
- Postal code: 1620
- Area code: 0628
- Website: shibpur.narsingdi.gov.bd

Shibpur Upazila mauza geocode map

Shibpur (Bengali: শিবপুর) is an upazila of Narsingdi District in the division of Dhaka, Bangladesh.

== Geography ==
Shibpur is located at 24.3750°N 90.7375°E. It has a total area 217.71 km^{2}.

== Demographics ==
Religions in Shibpur Upazila (2022)
Religion	Percent
Islam	96.09%
Hinduism	3.90%
Other or not stated	0.01%

According to the 2022 Bangladeshi census, Shibpur Upazila had 86,829 households and a population of 360,153. 9.94% of the population were under 5 years of age. Shibpur had a literacy rate (age 7 and over) of 76.96%: 78.16% for males and 75.84% for females, and a sex ratio of 94.77 males for every 100 females. 41,533 (11.53%) lived in urban areas.

According to the 2011 Census of Bangladesh, Shibpur Upazila had 65,094 households and a population of 303,813. 71,943 (23.68%) were under 10 years of age. Shibpur had a literacy rate (age 7 and over) of 55.73%, compared to the national average of 51.8%, and a sex ratio of 1047 females per 1000 males. 26,504 (8.72%) lived in urban areas.

As of the 1991 Bangladesh census, Shibpur has a population of 237246. Males constitute 50.77% of the population, and females 49.23%. This Upazila's eighteen up population is 117487. Shibpur has an average literacy rate of 32.3% (7+ years), and the national average of 32.4% literate.

== Economy ==
Shibpur is a densely industrial area, and is home to many textile mills. Narsingdi gas field is located in the Shibpur upazila under Narsingdi district adjacent to the Dhaka-Sylhet highway about 45 km away of northernmost east direction from capital city of Bangladesh, Dhaka. This field was discovered by Petrobangla in 1990. Total recoverable gas reserves of this field re-estimated by Hydrocarbon Unit is 215 billion cubic feet (6.1×109 m3). Commercial gas production was started in 1996 and till 31 August 2006 total 66.304 billion cubic feet (1.8775×109 m3) or 30.84 percent of gas reserves has been recovered.

== Administration ==
Shibpur Upazila is divided into Shibpur Municipality and nine union parishads: Ayubpur, Baghabo, Chakradha, Dulalpur, Joshar, Joynagar, Masimpur, Putia, and Sadharchar. The union parishads are subdivided into 115 mauzas and 194 villages.

Shibpur Municipality is subdivided into 9 wards and 17 mahallas.

== Education ==
- Gov. Saheed Asad College
- Baghabo Union High School
- Brammondi govt Primary school
- Kundar para Govt Primary school
- Shibpur Pilot Model High School
- Shibpur Saheed Asad Collegiate Girl's High School & College
- Shibpur Pilot Girls High School
- Abdul Mannan Bhuiyan College
- Abdul Mannan Bhuiyan Adarsho Biddyapith
- Shibpur Model Gov Primary School
- Masimpur Gov. Primary School
- Datter Gaon Gov. Primary School
- Datter Gaon High School
- Sabuj Pahar College, Shibpur
- Harihardi High School & College, Shibpur
- Shibpur Model College
- Syed Nagar Govt. Primary School
- Syed Nagar Ataur Rahman High School
- Dulalpur High School
- Telia Jawakandi high School
- Moharpara High School
- Doripura Model High School
- Lakhpur Shimulia High School
- Kharia High School & College
- Chaitainno High school
- Majlishpur High School
- Gashutia Govt. Primary School

== Notable residents ==
- Rabiul Awal Kiran Khan (1940–1986), politician
- Amanullah Asaduzzaman (1942–1969), Language martyr, was born in Shibpur.
- Abdul Mannan Bhuiyan

== See also ==
- Upazilas of Bangladesh
- Districts of Bangladesh
- Divisions of Bangladesh
