= Muinul Islam =

Bangladeshi economist and academic (born 1950)

- Born: 1 July 1950 (age 76); Noapara, Raozan Upazila, Chittagong District, East Bengal, Dominion of Pakistan

Academic background
- Education: University of Dhaka; McMaster University; Vanderbilt University

Academic work
- Institutions: University of Chittagong
- Awards: Ekushey Padak

Muinul Islam (born 1 July 1950) is a Bangladeshi economist and academic. He was awarded Ekushey Padak by the Government of Bangladesh in 2018.

== Early life and education ==
Islam was born in Noapara village, Raozan Upazila in Chittagong District to Obaidul Haque and Shazma Khatun. He completed his master's from the University of Dhaka, second master's from McMaster University in 1976 and Ph.D. from Vanderbilt University in 1981.

== Career ==
Islam is a retired economics professor at the University of Chittagong. He is the former chairperson of Bangladesh Economist Association (BEA) and University Grant Commission professor.
