= Muhammad Takiullah =

Bangladeshi language movement veteran

- Born: 1926
- Died: 16 November 2017 (aged 91); Dhaka, Bangladesh
- Father: Muhammad Shahidullah
- Relatives: Murtaja Baseer (brother)

Muhammad Takiullah (1926 – 16 November 2017) was a Bangladeshi language movement veteran. He was awarded Ekushey Padak in 2018 by the Government of Bangladesh. He was the fourth son of the Bengali linguist Muhammad Shahidullah.

== Career ==
Takiullah reformed the Bangla calendar Promita Bangla Barshapanji. He was involved with the communist movement since the 1940s. He served as the general secretary of the Dhaka committee of the Communist Party in 1951.
