= Jatiya Krishak Samity =

JKS symbol

Jatiya Krishak Samity (Bengali: জাতীয় কৃষক সমিতি, 'National Peasants Association') is a farmers organization in Bangladesh, connected to the Workers Party of Bangladesh. As of 2014 Fazle Hossain Badsha (Member of Parliament) was the president of JKS and Aminul Islam Golap the general secretary.
