= Supreme Commander's Headquarters (India and Pakistan) =

Supreme Commander's Headquarters (India and Pakistan) was a short-lived British military command, the successor to General Headquarters, India. It was established by the Joint Defence Council of India and Pakistan prior to Independence in 1947 and was intended to oversee the withdrawal of the majority of the British Armed Forces in India, along with assisting with the organisation and nationalisation of the newly created armed forces of India and Pakistan.

== Background ==
The Supreme Commander's Headquarters was established with the support of the leadership of the Indian National Congress and the Muslim League and with the approval of the Viceroy and Governor-General of India, the Viscount Mountbatten. It consisted of senior British officers and soldiers deputed to assist the Joint Defence Council. Due to mutual disagreements between the Indian and Pakistani leaders over the continued necessity of a Joint Defence Council following independence and Partition in August 1947, the Supreme Commander India and Pakistan, Field Marshal Auchinleck, requested the British government to close the headquarters and withdraw all its personnel.

== Structure ==
The Supreme Commander's Headquarters was established by the Joint Defence Council with effect from 11 August 1947. It was headed by Field Marshal Claude Auchinleck, the Supreme Commander India and Pakistan from that date until 30 November 1947. From November 1947, the Supreme Commander's Headquarters was dissolved and replaced by a downgraded formation, the Headquarters British Forces in India and Pakistan, with the sole responsibility of overseeing the welfare of all British officers and soldiers in the remaining headquarters or on secondment with the Indian and Pakistan armed services. With effect from 1 January 1948, this headquarters was also closed and replaced by two smaller independent headquarters commands, the Commander British Forces in India and the Commander British Forces in Pakistan, located at Bombay (Mumbai) and Karachi, respectively, and with the responsibility of overseeing the repatriation of British units to the United Kingdom.

The RAF liaison squadron for the headquarters, the Supreme Commander's Headquarters Communications Squadron, formed on 15 August 1947 at RAF Palam, New Delhi, from the previous Air Headquarters India communications squadron. It disbanded four months later on 17 December 1947 at Palam. It reportedly became a communications flight.

=== Supreme Commander's Headquarters (India and Pakistan) (August-November 1947) ===
Supreme Commander India and Pakistan

- Field Marshal Sir Claude Auchinleck (to 30 November 1947)

Deputy Supreme Commander (Navy)

- Vice-Admiral Sir Geoffrey Audley Miles (to 30 November 1947)

Deputy Supreme Commander (Army)

- Lieutenant General Sir Arthur Smith (to 30 November 1947)

Deputy Supreme Commander (Air)

- Air Marshal Hugh Walmsley (to 1 November 1947)
- Air Commodore Richard Jordan (1-30 November 1947)

GOC, British Troops in India and Pakistan

- Major General Lashmer Whistler (15 August - 30 November 1947)

=== Headquarters British Forces in India and Pakistan (December 1947) ===
Commander British Forces in India and Pakistan

- Lieutenant-General Sir Arthur Smith (1-31 December 1947)

=== Commander British Forces in India (1948) ===
- Major General Lashmer Whistler (1 January-28 February 1948)

=== Commander British Forces in Pakistan (1948) ===
- Group Captain Denis Barnett (from 1 January 1948)
