= 1969 East Pakistan mass uprising =

Uprising in East Pakistan against Muhammad Ayub Khan

- Part of the 1968–69 Pakistan revolution
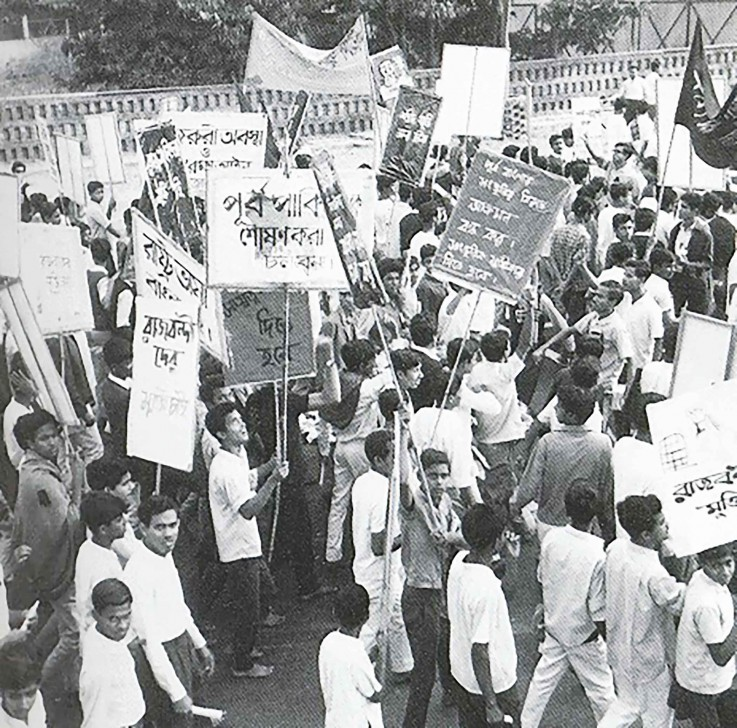
- A student procession at the University of Dhaka campus during the mass uprising of 1969.
- Date: January 1969 – March 1969
- Location: East Pakistan
- Caused by: Authoritarianism
- Goals: Resignation of President Ayub Khan, Withdrawal of Agartala Conspiracy Case, and Autonomy for East Pakistan Six Points
- Methods: Protest march
- Result: Ayub Khan's resignation Yahya Khan becomes president

Parties
All-Pakistan Awami League; National Awami Party; Communist Party of East Pakistan	Government of Pakistan; Pakistan Armed Forces; Pakistan Army; Convention Muslim League

Lead figures
Sheikh Mujibur Rahman	Ayub Khan

Casualties
- Deaths: 68 (including Zahurul Haq)

The 1969 East Pakistan mass uprising (Bengali: ঊনসত্তরের গণঅভ্যুত্থান, lit. '69's Mass Uprising') was a democratic political uprising in East Pakistan. It was led by the students backed by various political parties such as the Awami League, National Awami Party, and Communist Party of East Pakistan and their student wings, and the cultural fronts (writers, poets, musicians, singers, actors, etc.) against Ayub Khan, the president of Pakistan, in protest of the oppressive military rule, political repressions, the Agartala Conspiracy Case, and the incarceration of Bangabandhu Sheikh Mujibur Rahman and other Bengali nationalists.

The uprising consisted of mass demonstrations and sporadic conflicts between government armed forces and the demonstrators. Although the unrest began in 1966 with the six point movement of the Awami League, it got momentum at the beginning of 1969. It culminated in the resignation of Ayub Khan. The uprising also led to the withdrawal of the Agartala Conspiracy Case and acquittal of Sheikh Mujibur Rahman and other defendants.

== Background ==
In October 1958, General Ayub Khan seized power in Pakistan through a coup.

The Agartala Conspiracy Case was filed in 1968 as a sedition case by the government of Pakistan against Sheikh Mujibur Rahman, the then leader of the Awami League and East Pakistan, and 34 other people. The case is officially called State vs. Sheikh Mujibur Rahman and others, but is popularly known as the Agartala Shoŗojontro Mamla (Agartala conspiracy case) as the main conspiracy was purported to have taken place in the Indian city of Agartala in Tripura state, where Sheikh Mujib's associates met Indian military officials.

== Timeline of events in 1969 ==
=== January ===
Sarbadaliya Chhatra Sangram Parishad (Note: English: All Party Students' Action Committee) was formed on 5 January 1969. It was formed through the joining of the East Pakistan Students' Union (Matia), East Pakistan Chhatra League, East Pakistan Students' Union (Menon), and student leaders of Dhaka University Students Union (DUCSU). The Parishad created an Eleven Points Program that was based on the 1965 Six Point Program of Sheikh Mujibur Rahman and the Awami League. The Parishad was based in the University of Dhaka, and it became the principal political entity of East Pakistan. The Parishad spread to different universities in East Pakistan. The Parishad called a meeting on 17 January despite the police placing section 144. The police and students clashed in the streets, which injured many students and an EPRTC bus was burnt down.

7–8 January: Formation of a political coalition named the Democratic Action Committee (DAC) to restore democracy. The Awami League mobilized against President Ayub Khan government. Democratic Action Committee spokesman was Nawabzada Nasrullah Khan. The DAC called for the release of Abdul Wali Khan and Sheikh Mujibur Rahman.

20 January: The Parishad called a strike on 20 January throughout the province. Amanullah Asaduzzaman, a leftist student leader, was killed by police firing in the strike. The Parishad in response called strikes and processions from 21 to 24 January. On 24 January clashes took place throughout the province between strikers and police personal. One protester - Alamgir Mansur (Mintu) was killed in Mymensingh due to police action. Many were injured throughout the province. Matiur Rahman Mallik, a class nine student of Nabakumar Institution, and Rustam Ali were killed in Dhaka. 61 activists were killed in the protests. The student league formed Kendriya Chhatra Sangram Parishad on 12 January 1970 thus ending Sarbadaliya Chhatra Sangram Parishad.

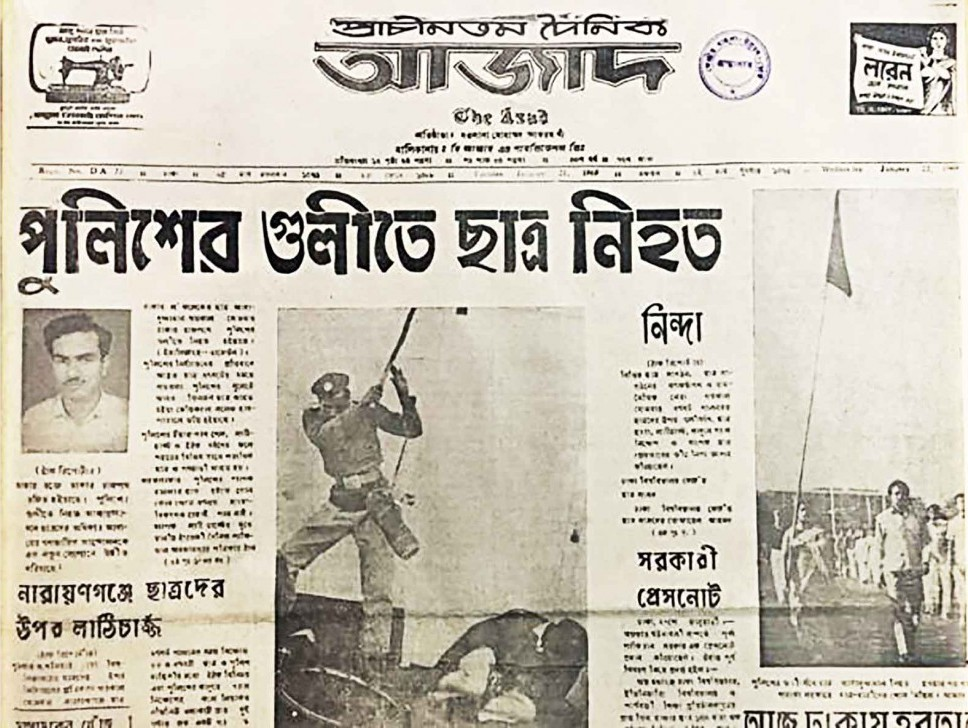
Asaduzzaman's death reported in The Azad newspaper on 21 January 1969

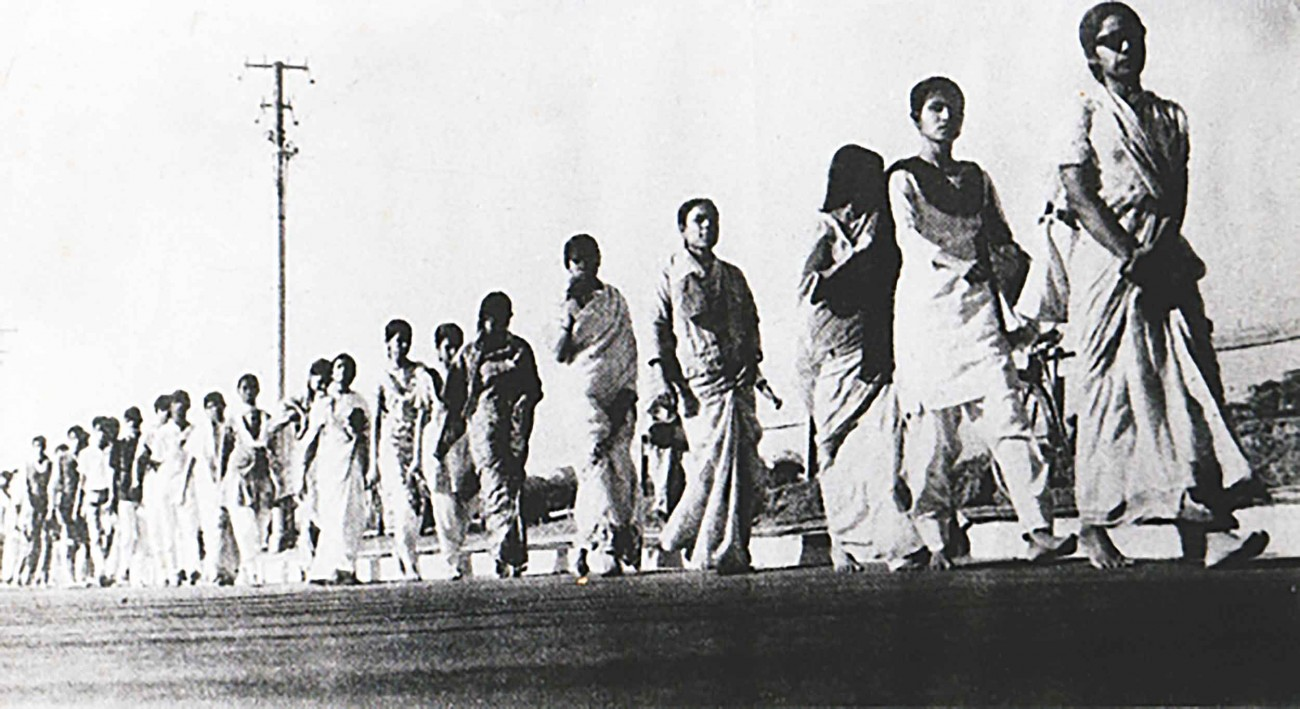
Deepa Sen, leading the procession by University of Dhaka students (25 January 1969)

24 January: Matiur Rahman Mallik, a teenage activist, is gunned down by the police. This day is observed as the Mass Upsurge Day in Bangladesh.

=== February ===
Pakistan Muslim League in East Pakistan called for the release of detained students and the removal of Abdul Monem Khan as governor of East Pakistan. The Pakistan Muslim League also re-elected President Ayub Khan as party president for a two-year term.

15 February: Sergeant Zahurul Haq, one of the convicts of Agartala Conspiracy Case, is assassinated in the prison of Kurmitola Cantonment. Haq's death led to more street protests and state guest house and other government buildings were burned down and the "February 15 Bahini" was created as the first armed opposition.

18 February: Shamsuzzoha of the University of Rajshahi is killed as the police open fire on a silent procession in Rajshahi.

22 February: Withdrawal of Agartala Conspiracy Case. Sheikh Mujibur Rahman, leader of the All-Pakistan Awami League, released from his prison cell in the Dhaka cantonment.

23 February: Sheikh Mujibur Rahman is accorded a grand reception, where he is given the title Bangabandhu (friend of Bengal). The Awami League derived its popularity from Sheikh Mujibur Rahman who had been released after two years imprisonment. He received a hero's welcome in East Pakistan.

=== March ===
Ayub Khan calls for a round-table meeting with the opposition. Sheikh Mujibur Rahman submitted a draft constitution based on the six point movement and the eleven point movement.

On 25 March 1969, martial law was declared in Pakistan and Ayub Khan hands over power to General Yahya Khan, the army Chief of Staff of Pakistan Army. Ayub Khan had remarked before handing over power that Sheikh Mujibur Rahman's draft "would liquidate the central government and army".

== Aftermath ==
On 28 November 1969, President Yahya Khan announced that national elections will take place in October 1970. The newly elected assembly will frame the constitution of Pakistan according to Yahya Khan. Khan also announced that West Pakistan would be broken into separate provinces.

On 31 March 1970, President Yahya Khan announced a Legal Framework Order (LFO) which called for direct elections for a unicameral legislature. Many in the West feared the East wing's demand for countrywide provincial autonomy. The purpose of the LFO was to secure the future Constitution which would be written after the election so that it would include safeguards such as preserving Pakistan's territorial integrity and Islamic ideology.

The integrated province of West Pakistan which was formed on 22 November 1954 was abolished and four provinces were retrieved: Punjab, Sindh, Balochistan and the North-West Frontier Province. The principles of representation was made on the basis of population, and since East Pakistan had more population than the combined population of the four provinces of West Pakistan, the former got more than half seats in the National Assembly. Yahya Khan ignored reports that Sheikh Mujib planned to disregard the LFO and that India was increasingly interfering in East Pakistan. Nor did he believe that the Awami League would actually sweep the elections in East Pakistan.

General elections were held in Pakistan on 7 December 1970 to elect members of the National Assembly. They were the first general elections since the independence of Pakistan and ultimately the only ones held prior to the independence of Bangladesh. Voting took place in 300 general constituencies, of which 162 were in East Pakistan and 138 in West Pakistan. A further thirteen seats were reserved for women (seven of which were in East Pakistan and six of which were in West Pakistan), who were to be elected by members of the National Assembly.

== See also ==
- 1990 Bangladesh mass uprising
- Non-cooperation movement (2024)
