= Matiur Rahman Mallik =

Bengali activist

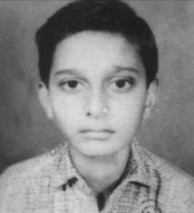
- Born: 24 January 1953; Dhaka, East Bengal, Pakistan
- Died: 24 January 1969; Dhaka, East Pakistan, Pakistan
- Known for: Activism during 1969 uprising in East Pakistan
- Father: Azhar Ali Mallik
- Awards: Independence Day Award (2018)

Matiur Rahman Mallik (24 January 1953 – 24 January 1969) was a Pakistani Bengali national activist. He was killed by the Pakistani police during 1969 uprising in East Pakistan. He received the Independence Day Award from the Government of Bangladesh in 2018.

== Background ==
Malik was the son of Azhar Ali Mallik from Sabujbagh, Dhaka. He was a Standard IX student of Nabakumar Institution when he took part in a street march demanding autonomy for East Pakistan, the future country of Bangladesh. The uprising has historic significance and its spirit awakened people to fight for democracy and basic human rights, as it eventually led to the independence of Bangladesh. A letter was found in Matiur's pocket after he was shot dead by the police. The letter said, "Mother, I am going to the procession, if I don't return, I will be afraid that I have become a martyr."

== Commemoration ==
Bangladesh observes 24 January as Mass Uprising Day. Every year different social, cultural organisations and political parties do elaborate programmes in observance of the day. Malik's monument was erected at Nabakumar Institute, Bakshibazar, Dhaka.
