= Nabakumar Institution =

Coordinates: 23.7210°N 90.3955°E

Location
- 16 Umesh Dutta Road, Bakshibazar, Dhaka; Bangladesh

Information
- Type: Private school
- Established: 1916
- Enrollment: 1800
- Campus type: urban
- Website: niadsc.edu.bd

Nabakumar Institution is a historical education institute in Bakshi Bazar of Old Dhaka, Bangladesh.

== History ==
Nabakumar Institution was established in 1916 by a zamindar called Nabakumar. It was operated as a school though it was named an institute. In 1973 it opened a college branch.

Matiur Rahman Mallik, a ninth grade student of Nabakumar Institution, was killed during a street march demanding autonomy for the then East Pakistan by the Pakistan police on 24 January 1969. The day is seen as Mass Upsurge Day by the Bangladeshi as it eventually led to the Bangladesh Liberation War. In remembrance of this great sacrifice for the nation Matiur Rahman Monument was constructed in its premises.

== Notable alumni ==
- Abdul Waheed Chowdhury, military officer
- A. K. M. Miraj Uddin, freedom fighter, athlete and politician
- Matiur Rahman Mallik, student activist
- Mohammad Abu Yusuf, footballer
- Mohammed Sultan Ahmed, footballer
- Niaz Mohammad Chowdhury, musician
