= Timeline of Bangladeshi history =

This is a timeline of Bangladeshi history, comprising important legal and territorial changes and political events in Bangladesh and its predecessor states. To read about the background to these events, see history of Bangladesh and the history of Bengal. See also list of presidents of Bangladesh, list of prime ministers of Bangladesh, list of years in Bangladesh, list of wars involving Bangladesh and list of rulers of Bengal.

== 200th century BCE ==
| Year | Date | Event |
|---|---|---|
| 20,000 BCE | | Stone Age tools found in the region indicate human habitation for over 20,000 years. |

== 40th century BCE ==
| Year | Date | Event |
|---|---|---|
| 4000 BCE | | Remnants of Copper Age settlements, including pit dwellings, date back 4,000 years. The region was settled by Dravidian, Tibeto-Burman and Austroasiatic peoples. |

== 16th century BCE ==
| Year | Date | Event |
|---|---|---|
| 1600 BCE | | Chalcolithic period. The Pandu Rajar Dhibi archaeological site dates to this period. |

== 13th century BCE ==
| Year | Date | Event |
|---|---|---|
| 1280 BCE | | Emergence of the Pundravardhana (Pundra) Kingdom in modern-day Rajshahi and Rangpur |

== 11th century BCE ==
| Year | Date | Event |
|---|---|---|
| 1100 BCE | | Establishment of the Vanga kingdom and Anga kingdom |

== 10th century BCE ==
| Year | Date | Event |
|---|---|---|
| 1000 BCE | | The origin of the word Bangla ~ Bengal is unknown, but it is believed to be derived from the Dravidian-speaking tribe Bang that settled in the area around the year 1000 BCE. |

== 7th century BCE ==
| Year | Date | Event |
|---|---|---|
| 700 BCE | | Urban civilization emerges at Mahasthangarh, Bogra district, capital of the Pundravardhana area. |

== 6th century BCE ==
| Year | Date | Event |
|---|---|---|
| 530 BCE | | Disestablishment of the Anga Kingdom |
| 544 BCE | | Conquest of the island of Lanka by Vijaya Singha (Modern day Sri Lanka) |

== 5th century BCE ==
| Year | Date | Event |
|---|---|---|
| 450 BCE | | Urban civilization emerges at Wari-Bateshwar |

== 4th century BCE ==
| Year | Date | Event |
|---|---|---|
| 340 BCE | | Destablishment of the Vanga kingdom |
| 345 BCE | | Destablishment of the Pundravardhana Kingdom |

== 3rd century BCE ==
| Year | Date | Event |
|---|---|---|
| c. 300 BCE | | The kingdom of Gangaridai emerges and is mentioned in an account by Greek traveller Megasthenes. Ancient city of Pundravardhana also dates back to this period. |
| | | Mauryan Conquest of Pundravardhana |

== 3rd century ==
| Year | Date | Event |
|---|---|---|
| 200-250 | | Rise of Local Janapadas: Local tribal oligarchies and small kingdoms consolidate their power base into distinct geopolitical regions (Janapadas) across the Bangladesh delta. These include Pundra (northern Bangladesh), Vanga (southern/southeastern delta), and Samatata (the trans-Meghna river valley). |
| 220 | | Roman-Egyptian Maritime Contact:Global trade via the Bay of Bengal peaks. Archaeological evidence (such as Roman rouletted pottery and coins) points to active maritime interaction between coastal Bengal and Roman Egypt via the Red Sea. |

== 4th century ==
| Year | Date | Event |
|---|---|---|
| 335-375 | | Mention of Samatata in Allahabad Pillar inscription as a tributary of the Gupta empire under Samudragupta. |
| 350 | | Gupta Emperor Samudragupta subjugated northern Bengal (Pundravardhana) and forced the frontier kingdom of Samatata (the Comilla–Noakhali region) to pay tribute. |
| 375-415 | | Samatata is annexed to the Gupta empire during the reign of Chandragupta II. |

== 5th century ==
| Year | Date | Event |
|---|---|---|
| 401-410 | | The renowned Chinese Buddhist monk and scholar Fa-Hien toured the region at the turn of the 5th century. In his travelogues, he documented the flourishing state of Buddhism and peace in the Bengal delta under early Gupta rule. He noted the existence of numerous active monasteries, smooth maritime trade routes, and a highly stable socio-economic ecosystem. |

== 6th century ==
| Year | Date | Event |
|---|---|---|
| 507-? | | Gupta influence dwindles during the reign of Vainyagupta emerges as an independent ruler of eastern Bengal. |
| 525-575 | | Reign of the independent Vanga kingdom in Bengal. |
| 554-590 | | Reign of Jayanaga,first independent king of Gauda. |
| 590-636 | | Reign of Shashanka, foundation of Gauda Kingdom. |
| 593-594 | | Start of the Bengali calendar |

== 7th century ==
| Year | Date | Event |
|---|---|---|
| 625 | | Khadgodyama (to 640) |
| 636 | | Death of Shashanka,1st independent emperor of Bengal.Starting of Matsyanyaya in Bengal for more than a century. |
| 640 | | Jatakhadga (to 658) |
| 658 | | Devakhadga (to 673) |
| 671 | | Khadga–Rata Conflict in Samatata region.Rata ruler,Sridharana Rata was defeated and Vanga based Khadga dynasty king Devakhadga won the war and Khadgas absorbed Samatata region. |
| 673 | | Rajabhata (to 690) |
| 690 | | Balabhata (to 705) |

== 8th century ==
| Year | Date | Event |
|---|---|---|
| 725-735 | | Invasion of Yashovarman of Kannauj in Bengal. |
| 736-740 | | Invasion of Lalitaditya of Kashmir,Karkota dynasty in Bengal,defeating five kings of Bengal. |
| 750 | | Gopala I, founder of the Pala Dynasty comes to power in Gaur through a democratic election.End of Matsyanyaya in Bengal. |
| 750 | | Kings of the Pala Empire rule the entire subcontinent from Gauda. (to 1000) |
| 750-810 | | Pala consolidation under Gopala and Dharmapala |

== 9th century ==
| Year | Date | Event |
|---|---|---|
| 800 | | Approximate establishment date of Somapura Mahavihara(Present day Paharpur,Naongaon district) by Pala king Dharmapala. |
| 900 | | Rule of the Candra or Chandra dynasty in the Harikela (south-east Bangladesh) region. (to 1000) |
| 900-930 | | Chandra dynasty king Trailokyachandra’s conquest in Vanga and Samatata. |
| 950 | | Start of writing of Charyapada, the oldest writing form of Bengali language. |

== 10th century ==
| Year | Date | Event |
|---|---|---|
| 1100 | | Estimate year of Dhakeshwari temple in Dhaka was built by Ballal Sen,a king of Sena Dynasty. |

== 11th century ==
| Year | Date | Event |
|---|---|---|
| 1095 | | Hemanta Sen declares himself king of Bengal founding the Sena dynasty. |
| 1095 | | Rule of Sena Dynasty in Bengal. (to 1204) |
| 1158-1169 | | Introduction of Kulinism(Medieval caste system) by Sena ruler Ballal Sen in Bengal. |

== 13th century ==
| Year | Date | Event |
|---|---|---|
| 1204 | | Ikhtiyar Uddin Muhammad Bin Bakhtiyar Khalji's conquest of Bengal. Onset of Muslim rule in Bengal. |
| 1204 | | Establishment of the Khalji dynasty (Bengal) by the Khilji Maliks. (to 1226) |
| | | Destruction of Somapura Mahavihara by Bakhtiyar Khalji. |
| 1226 | | Iltutmish, Sultan of Delhi, invades Bengal and kills Ghiyasuddin Iwaj Shah, the last Khilji ruler. |
| 1227 | | Rule of the Mameluk Sultans of Delhi. (to 1281) |
| 1281 | | Rule of the Mahmud Shahi dynasty. (to 1324) |

== 14th century ==
| Year | Date | Event |
|---|---|---|
| 1303 | | Conquest of Sylhet by Lakhnauti Sultanate led by Sikandar Khan Ghazi, the military general of Sultan Shamsuddin Firoz Shah. They defeated king Gour Govinda of Gour Kingdom of medieval Sylhet with the help of Shah Jalal, a Muslim saint. |
| 1328 | | Ghiyasuddin Bahadur Shah, the last ruler of the dynasty is defeated and killed by the army of the Delhi Sultanate. |
| 1338 | | Establishment of the Mubarak Shahi Dynasty by Fakhruddin Mubarak Shah, the ruling dynasty of the Sonargaon Sultanate Death of Izzuddin Yahya and the ascension of Shamsuddin Ilyas Shah to the throne of the Satagon/Saptagram Sultanate |
| 1342 | | First period of rule by the independent Ilyas Shahi Dynasty. (to 1414) |
| 1349 | | Shamsuddin Ilyas Shah's Invasion of Nepal and occupation of Tirhut |
| 1352 | | Unification of the City states or Sultanates (Sonargaon, Lakhnauti, Satgaon) by Shamsuddin Ilyas Shah and the formation of the Bengal Sultanate. |
| 1353-1359 | | Ekdala Wars - Bengal Sultanate achieved its independence from the Delhi Sultanate |

== 15th century ==
| Year | Date | Event |
|---|---|---|
| 1414 | | The Ganesha Dynasty usurps power. (to 1415) |
| 1415 | | Jalaluddin Muhammad Shah assumes power (to 1416); Beginning of the Bengal Sultanate war with the Jaunpur Sultanate |
| 1416 | | Raja Ganesha's second phase (to 1418) |
| 1418 | | Jalaluddin Muhammad Shah second phase (to 1433) |
| 1420 | | End of the war between the Bengal Sultanate and the Jaunpur Sultanate and the annexation of parts of Jaunpaur by the Bengal Sultanate |
| 1429 | February - 18 April | Restoration of Min Saw Mon and Mrauk U became a vassal state of the Bengal Sultanate |
| 1433 | | Shamsuddin Ahmad Shah (son of Jalaluddin Muhammad Shah) assumes power |
| 1436 | | Nasiruddin Mahmud Shah restores the Ilyas Shahi Dynasty. |
| 1436 | | Second period of rule by the Ilyas Shahi Dynasty. (to 1486) |
| 1487 | | Jalaluddin Fateh Shah is assassinated by Habshi slaves. |
| 1487 | | Rule of the Habshi Sultans. (to 1494) |
| 1494 | | Rule of the Hussain Shahi dynasty. (to 1538) |
| 1498 | | Bengal Sultanate–Kamata Kingdom War - Bengal Sultanate takes over the Khen dynasty |

== 16th century ==
| Year | Date | Event |
|---|---|---|
| 1512 | | Beginning of the Bengal Sultanate–Kingdom of Mrauk U War |
| 1513 | | Husain Shah assigned the charge of Arakan expedition to Paragal Khan. Paragal Khan advanced from his base on the Feni River. The expedition of territory to the western bank of Kaladan River was placed under his governorship administration. |
| 1515 | | Chhuti Khan,Governor of Chittagong ordered his court poet Srikar Nandi to translate the Ashvamedha chapter of the Mahabharat from Sanskrit to Bengali. The poem was written in a couplet and tripathi matra format and was called the Chhutikhani Mahabharata. |
| 1516 | | End of the Bengal Sultanate–Kingdom of Mrauk U War. The Bengal Sultanate annexed Chittagong and northern Arakan. |
| 1534 | | The Portuguese arrive at Chittagong and receive trade permits. |
| 1538 | | Ghiyasuddin Mahmud Shah, the last Hussain Shahi Sultan and his Portuguese allies are defeated by Sher Shah Suri. |
| 1538 | | Humayun occupies Gaur, but leaves Bengal to Sher Shah Suri. |
| 1575 | | Battle of Tukaroi between the Sultanate of Bangala and the Mughal Empire. |
| 1576 | | === Formation of the === : Baro-Bhuyan confederacy in Bengal; Independent principality by Sulaiman Khan Karrani in the Bhati (region).; Bengal Subah province by the Mughal Empire |
| 1578 | | Mughal Subahdar Khan Jahan invades the Bhati region of East Bengal, but is defeated by Isa Khan and his allies, near Kishoreganj. |
| 1584 | | Mughal Subahdar Shahbaz Khan captures Sonargaon, capital of Isa Khan who then defeats the Mughal army in the battles of Egarasindhur and Bhawal to reclaim his lands. |
| 1586 | | The second campaign of Shahbaz Khan. Isa Khan proposes peace and pretends loyalty. |
| 1592 | | Amber Fort is built by Man Singh I the 9th Subahdar of Bengal |
| 1594 | | Raja Man Singh is appointed Subahdar of Bengal, Bihar, and Orissa. |
| 1597 | | Man Singh sends forces against Isa Khan but they are defeated in a naval battle near Vikrampur. |

== 17th century ==
| Year | Date | Event |
|---|---|---|
| 1608 | | Subahdar Islam Khan's leads an expedition into Bengal to subjugate the local rulers then moves the provincial capital to Dhaka and renames it Jahangir Nagar. (to 1613) |
| 1611 | | Conquest of Jessore by the Mughal Empire. Pratapaditya the Zamindar of Jessore was taken as prisoner of War |
| 1612 | | Dissolution of the Baro-Bhuyan confederacy in Bengal |
| 1614-1615 | | Mrauk U invasion of Bhulua (Present day Noakhali):Kingdom of Mrauk U and Portuguese pirates of Sandwip jointly invaded Bhulna,briefly annexed but later defeated by the Mughal army.It was the beginning of Mughal-Arakanese conflicts. |
| 1648 | | Bengali poet Alaol wrote the epic poem Padmavati in the court of Buddhist Arakan king,Sanda Thudhamma. |
| 1665 | November | Beginning of the war between the Bengal Subah (Mughal Empire) supported by the Dutch East India Company and Portuguese India against the Arakan Kingdom. |
| 1666 | 27 January | End of the war - Bengali (Mughal) victory and the annexation of Chittagong into the Mughal Empire |
| 1678 | | Lalbagh Fort construction started by Mughal prince Muhammad Azam Shah,but later by Shaista Khan,subahdar of Bengal did not complete the fort and left the place in 1684. |

== 18th century ==
| Year | Date | Event |
|---|---|---|
| 1706-1710 | | Establishment of Natore Rajbari,later royal seat of Rani Bhabani,one of the most prominent influential aristocrat and zamindar in 18th century Bengal. |
| 1717 | | De facto Independence of the Bengal Subah from the Mughal Empire and the beginning of the Nasiri Dynasty of Murshid Quli Khan. |
| 1740 | 26 April | Battle of Giria Short and severe battle resulting in the defeat and death of Sarfaraz Khan and Alivardi Khan usurping and becoming the Nawab of Bengal. End of the Nasiri Dynasty of Murshid Quli Khan and the beginning of the Afsar Dynasty of Alivardi Khan. |
| | | Establishment of Farashganj near Dhaka by French East India Company. |
| 1741 | 3 March | Alivardi Khan retakes Orissa by defeating Rustam Jang deputy governor of Orissa and a relative of Sarfaraz Khan, in the Battle of Phulwarion |
| 1756 | 16 October | Siraj-ud-Daulah defeats his cousin Shaukat Jang in the Battle of Manihari. |
| 1757 | | Battle of Palashi. a decisive British East India Company victory over the Nawab of Bengal establishes Company rule in India. The last Nawab was Nawab Siraj ud-Daulah |
| 1764 | | Battle of Buxar, With the defeat of Mir Qasim, Mir Jafar's successor at the Battle of Buxer, the ruling power of Bengal was formally taken over by the British. |
| 1765 | | After the Battle of Buxar, in 1765, Robert Clive received the civil rights of Bengal-Bihar-Orissa from the last Mughal Emperor of Delhi, Shah Alam. |
| 1770 | | Bengal famine of 1770 causes the death of 10 million people.(1/3 portion people died) |
| 1781 | | Armenian Church is built in the Armanitola area of Old Dhaka on land donated by the wealthy merchant Agaminus Catchik. |
| 1788 | | Dhaka Central Jail is built. |
| 1793 | | Permanent Settlement Act imposed on Bengal. |

== 19th century ==
| Year | Date | Event |
|---|---|---|
| 1830 | | First Durga Puja organised in Dhaka in Maisundi area of Sutrapur at the residence of Nandalal Babu,a wealthy zamindar of Dhaka. |
| | | First census of Dhaka by Henry Walter. |
| 1841 | | Establishment of Dhaka College also known as the first college of Bangladesh. |
| 1846 | | Establishment of Dhaka's Brahmo Samaj by Braja Sundar Mitra with an initial meeting held at his residence in Shakhari Bazar,it had an important role in shaping 19th century Dhaka. |
| 1847 | August | Rangapur Bartabaha, first Bengali newspaper published in East Bengal with funding from Kalichandra Ray, the zamindar of Pargana Kundi. Its first editor was Gurucharan Sharma Roy. It ceased its publication in 1854. |
| 1857 | | Indian Rebellion of 1857 also known as the Sepoy Mutiny/ Indian Mutiny breaks out. |
| | November 22 | British authorities attempted to disarm the native sepoys at Lalbagh Fort in Dhaka. A fierce gun battle ensued. Over 40 sepoys were killed on the spot, and many captured mutineers were publicly hanged at the Antaghar Maidan. |
| 1858 | | East India Company is dissolved and the British Raj begins. |
| | 1 May | Mitford Hospital established in Dhaka. |
| | 2 August | The Government of India Act was passed in the British Parliament. |
| 1859-1860 | | Indigo revolt spread like wildfire against Indigo planters by Indigo farmers. Revolt in Khulna, Jessore, Pabna by farmers. |
| 1860 | | Dinabandhu Mitra wrote 'Nil Darpan' Bengali play where he exposed the torture inflicted upon local farmers, unifying the rural peasants and urban intelligentsia against colonial cruelty. |
| 1860 | | Indigo Commission formed. |
| 1861 | | In 1861, the Government of India was directed to set up a representative legislature in Bengal and the proceedings of the Bengal Legislative Assembly began. |
| | 7 March | Dhaka Prakash, the first Bengali language newspaper published in Dhaka. Initially served as a tool to promote and exchange issues of the Dhaka's Brahma Samaj. The newspaper played an important role to chronicle the social, cultural, and political developments of the region. Bengali poet Krishna Chandra Majumder was the first editor of the paper. The newspaper remained in publication for about a century. |
| 1862 | 1 February | The proceedings of the Bengal Legislative Assembly began. The number of members was 12. But in 1892, the number of member increased to 21. |
| | 15 November | Construction of first railway track in Eastern Bengal between Darshana ((located in the Chuadanga District) to Jagti (located in the Kushtia District) by Eastern Bengal Railway.This initial section spanned 53.11 km. |
| 1865 | | Purbabanga Rangabhumi,first stage theatre founded in Dhaka by Mohini Mohan Das, Abhay Das and other local cultural elites. |
| 1869 | | Dinajpur Government Girls' High School established in Dinajpur. It is the oldest girl's school in Bangladesh. |
| 1872 | March | Dacca People's Association or Dhaka Sadharan Sabha established in Dacca led by Ananda Chandra Roy, a prominent figure in Dacca.It is the oldest political organisation in East Bengal. |
| 1874 | | First Bengali Muslim led periodical first published from Dacca, named Azizannehar. Its first pioneer and editor was prominent Muslim novelist and playwright Mir Mosharraf Hossain. |
| 1876 | | To train local surveyors and engineers for the expanding railway and municipal infrastructure projects, the government founded the Dacca Survey School at Nalgola in Old Dhaka. |
| | | Nawab Faizunnesa's Rupjalal was published from Dhaka.It was the first literary work by any Muslim woman in Bengal. |
| | | Rassundari Devi's(born in Pabna) Amar Jiban,published in Calcutta,first autobiographical novel by any Bengali woman and also in Indian subcontinent. |
| 1879 | | Somapura and Paharpur Mahavihara, situated in Naogaon, Rajshahi were excavated by Sir Alexander Cunningham. He cleared a portion of the main central mound and uncovered the ruins of a square tower, though further extensive digging was halted at the time by the local landlord. |
| 1880 | | Completion of Northbrook Hall situated at Farashgonj road in Old Dhaka on the north bank of the Buriganga River. |
| | | Dacca College Cricket Club was the first cricket club in Eastern Bengal,established by Saradaranjan Ray, a pioneering sports organizer in Dacca. |
| 1884 | | Jagannath College established in Dhaka by Kishorilal Roy Chowdhury, the Zamindar of Baliati. |
| 1890 | | Permanently closing year of Purbabanga Rangabhumi,Eastern Bengal's first stage theatre due to complaints to police from influential neighbors in Dacca. |
| 1891 | | Age of Consent Act, 1891 comes into force that led to socio-political debate and public protests among orthodox factions in East Bengal. |
| 1897 | 12 June | 1897 Assam earthquake |
| 1898 | | Wari Club, Bangladesh's oldest association football club,founded by Rai Bahadur Surendranath Rai in Dacca. |
| | May 30-June 1 | Dhaka Session of Bengal Provincial Conference, attended by Rabindranath Tagore and Kali Charan Banerjee. |

== 20th century ==
| Year | Date | Event |
|---|---|---|
| 1901 | 10 May | Jagadish Chandra Bose using his newly invented Crescograph, Bose showed a hall packed with eminent scientists in the Royal Society in London in England that plant tissues react to external stimuli (like electric shocks, light, heat, and chemical poisons) in the exact same rhythmic, electrical manner as animal muscles and nerves. |
| 1903 | | Establishment of Victoria SC,a association football club by five prominent zamindars in Eastern Bengal. Its initial ground was Paltan Maidan,Dhaka. |
| | December | Risley Proposal formally announced a plan for territorial redistribution of Bengal. |
| 1905 | 16 October | Partition of Bengal. |
| | | Massive anti-partition of Bengal protest erupts in Dhaka,Sylhet,Mymensingh,Khulna and others places in Eastern Bengal.In Dhaka,protests led by Ananda Chandra Roy,Krishna Kumar Mitra in Mymensingh.In Dhaka,Khwaja Atikullah,brother of Nawab of Dhaka,broke away from his family's stance to support Bengal Partition,joined anti-partition protests in along with Swadeshi movement leaders. |
| | November | Dhaka Anushilan Samiti established in Dhaka by Pulin Behari Das to spread Swadeshi movement throughout East Bengal and revolutionary movement against the British Raj. |
| 1906 | 30 December | All-India Muslim League established in Dhaka's Israt Manzil Palace,sponsored by Nawab Sir Khwaja Salimullah, the Nawab of Dhaka. The party established for advocating rights of Muslims in India.On the very first session,members supported Partition of Bengal. |
| 1907 | | Haraprasad Shastri discovered Charyapad, the oldest known Bengali written form. |
| 1908 | | Barrah Dacoity by Dhaka Anushilan Samiti members,planned by Pulin Behari Das to raise funds to buy arms for freedom movement. Revolutionaries attacked Zamindar of Barrah's residence. |
| 1909 | 15 November | Indian Councils Act 1909 or Morley-Minto Reforms commenced. |
| 1911 | 29 July | Mohun Bagan defeats British East Yorkshire Regiment in the 1911 IFA Shield Final in Calcutta, final scoreline was 2–1, 8 players are from East Bengal including MB captain Shibdas Bhaduri. This victory fuels Nationalist freedom struggle in Bengal. |
| | 21 September | First mention of Dhaka Football League,in the Englishman's Overland Mail newspaper of 21 September 1911.This was the oldest association football league in Eastern Bengal.Strong contenders of this league during pre-partition time(1911–1947) were Wari Club,Victoria SC,Dacca Farm and Muslim Hall.In this league,there were 10 teams who compete for the trophy. |
| | 12 December | Partition of Bengal reversed by King George V announced at Delhi Durbar.A major upset for Muslim leaders in East Bengal. |
| 1912 | January | A high-level delegation of Bengali Muslim leaders met with Viceroy Lord Hardinge in Dhaka to secure the colonial government's firm commitment to building a university. |
| 1913 | June | Barisal Conspiracy Case, in Calcutta, among the 44 accused of Dhaka Anushilan Samiti, 12 pleaded guilty. Among them there was Pratul Chandra Ganguli, a noted revolutionary was deported to Andaman. |
| 1920 | 17 March | Birth of Sheikh Mujibur Rahman,future architect and founding father of Bangladesh. |
| 1921 | 1 July | Establishment of Dhaka University, the first university of East Bengal (now Bangladesh). |
| 1923 | | The Bengal Pact by Chittoranjan Das. |
| | | Deepali Sangha in Dhaka founded by Leela Roy, first female graduate and student of Dhaka University to empower women through a combination of education, political awareness, and physical self-defense. |
| 1926 | 19 January | Establishment of Freedom of Intellect Movement in Dhaka by rational and secular thinkers of Dhaka University to advocate rationality against religious and social dogma in Bengali Muslim society. |
| 1927 | | Begum Fazilatunnesa Zoha became first Muslim female student graduating from Dhaka University. |
| | 19 January | Muslim Sahitya-Samaj founded at Muslim Hall Union office in Dhaka University. The meeting was presided by Muhammad Shahidullah. |
| 1930 | 18 April | Chittagong Armoury Raid by Surya Sen and his Indian Republican Army.For almost two days Chittagong was free from the British Raj. |
| | 22 April | Battle of Jalalabad Hills between Surya Sen led revolutionaries and British troops. Over 80 soldiers and 12 revolutionaries killed in this battle. |
| | 9 June | 1930 Dhaka riots |
| | 29 August | Benoy Basu, a revolutionary assassinated Lowman, the Inspector General of Police, who was visiting an ailing officer in Mitford Medical School and Hospital in Dhaka. |
| 1932 | 24 September | Revolutionaries raided European Club in Chittagong led by Pritilata Waddedar. |
| 1933 | January | Establishment of Rahmatganj MFS as Rahmatganj Muslim Friends Society in Old Dhaka. It was founded by Abul Kashem Shaheb. It is the oldest Bengali Muslim owned association football club in Bangladesh. |
| 1934 | 12 January | Surya Sen was hanged on 12 January 1934 by the British rulers following the arrest in February 1933. |
| 1935 | | Zohra Begum Kazi becomes first Muslim female physician in the undivided Bengal.She got her MBBS degree from Lady Hardinge Medical College,Delhi. |
| 1936 | | Influence of Freedom of Intellect Movement waned. |
| | 31 October | Publication of The Azad newspaper by Maulana Mohammad Akram Khan in Calcutta. It supported Muslim League's agenda in its columns. After partition, this newspaper moved to Dhaka. |
| 1936 | September | A. K. Fazlul Huq forms the Krishak Sramik Party. |
| 1937 | 1 April | A. K. Fazlul Huq becomes Prime Minister of Bengal with support of Muslim League after 1937 election.It was the result of diplomatic failure of Congress to create a unified ministry and a PM from Congress in Bengal. |
| 1940 | 23 March | Lahore Resolution or Pakistan Declaration by Muslim League in Lahore. The resolution was written and prepared by a nine-member subcommittee of the Muslim League; presented by A. K. Fazlul Huq, the Prime Minister of Bengal. |
| 1941 | 18 March–April | 1941 Dhaka riots, communal riots occurred during the festival of Holi, leaving 55 to 107 fatalities. |
| 1943-1944 | | The Great Bengal Famine devastates the region, resulting in the deaths of an estimated 3.5 to 3.8 million people. The man-made catastrophe deeply ravages rural East Bengal due to wartime denial policies, hyperinflation, hoarding, and severe British administrative failures. |
| 1946 | January | 1946 election, it was a decisive victory for Muslim League in Bengal. Muslim League got 113 seats and Congress got only 86 seats in the election. Huseyn Shaheed Suhrawardy becomes PM of Bengal. It created the future that India will be partitioned. |
| | 10 October–November | Noakhali riots, communal riots occurred in the district of Noakhali, leaving 200 dead. (285 according to unofficial sources) Mahatma Gandhi came to Noakhali for peace mission. |
| 1947 | 14 & 15 August | Partition of British India, Pakistan and India become two independent states. |
| 1948 | 11 March | General strike by students protesting at the exclusion of Bengali as an official language. |
| 1948 | 21 March | Governor-General of Pakistan Muhammad Ali Jinnah declares in a civic reception that "Urdu, and only Urdu" will remain as the state language. |
| 1948 | 24 March | Jinnah reasserts his 'Urdu-only' policy in a speech at Curzon Hall at the University of Dhaka. |
| 1948 | 28 March | Jinnah reiterates his language policy on radio. |
| 1949 | 23 June | Formation of the Awami Muslim League |
| 1952 | 21 February | Bengali language movement reaches its peak as the police open fire on protesting students. |
| 1953 | 17 April | The Awami Muslim League becomes the Awami League. |
| 1954 | 11 March | The United Front wins most of the seats in the East Bengal Legislative Assembly. |
| 1954 | 30 May | Governor General Ghulam Muhammad deposes United Front government and establishes Governor-rule. |
| 1955 | 6 June | The United Front government is reinstated, Awami League does not participate. |
| 1955 | 14 October | 'East Bengal' renamed 'East Pakistan'. |
| 1956 | 29 February | Bengali becomes one of the state languages of Pakistan. |
| 1958 | 7 October | Constitution abrogated and martial law declared in Pakistan. |
| 1960 | 5 May | Dhaka Residential Model College Established. |
| 1963 | 21 February | Inauguration of the Shaheed Minar language martyr memorial. |
| 1964 | 2 January-28 March | 1964 East Pakistan riots |
| 1966 | 5 February | Six point Bengali nationalist movement led by Sheikh Mujibur Rahman emerges. |
| 1968 | | Agartala Conspiracy Case filed by the government of Pakistan accusing Sheikh Mujibur Rahman and others of sedition. |
| 1969 | January | Mass Uprising of '69 (ঊনসত্তরের গণ-অভ্যুত্থান) in East Pakistan. (to February) |
| 1969 | 25 March | Ayub Khan resigns and Agha Mohammad Yahya Khan assumes power under martial law. |
| 1970 | 12 November | 1970 Bhola cyclone |
| 1970 | 7 December | First general election in Pakistan. Awami League gains majority. |
| 1971 | 2 March | First hoisting of the National flag of Bangladesh (initial version) at the Dhaka University by Vice President of Dhaka University Students' Union (DUCSU) leader A. S. M. Abdur Rab. |
| 1971 | 7 March | Sheikh Mujibur Rahman makes his historic freedom speech. |
| 1971 | 25 March | Pakistan Army launches Operation Searchlight at midnight on the 25th, marking the start of the 1971 Bangladesh atrocities. Sheikh Mujib is arrested. (to 26 March) |
| 1971 | 25 March-28 March | 1971 Khulna jute mill massacres by Bengali nationalist mobs against Biharis.Over 1,000 were killed.Their bodies were dumped in a nearby river by the militant mob. |
| 1971 | 26 March | Sheikh Mujib declares the independence of Bangladesh before his arrest by Pakistani Army. |
| 1971 | 26-27 March | Shankharibazar massacre: Over 212 Bengali Hindus were killed by Pakistani Army in Dhaka. |
| 1971 | 27 March | Major Ziaur Rahman broadcasts the declaration of independence on behalf of Bangabandhu Sheikh Mujibur Rahman over the radio. |
| 1971 | 27 March | Mymensingh Cantonment massacre |
| 1971 | 27 March | Ramna massacre by Pakistani army in Dhaka. |
| 1971 | 27 March-17 April | Santahar massacre in the town of Santahar,Bogra,carried out by Mukti Bahini and Bengali mobs.Over 1,400 Biharis and Urdu speaking citizens were killed. |
| 1971 | 31 March | Kushtia resistance begins. |
| 1971 | 2 April | Jinjira genocide |
| 1971 | 10 April | Formation of a provisional Bangladesh government-in-exile. |
| 1971 | 18 April | M. A. G. Osmani takes command of the Bangladesh Armed Forces. |
| 1971 | 17 April | The government-in-exile takes oath at Mujibnagar. |
| 1971 | 18 April | Battle of Daruin, Comilla and Battle of Rangamati-Mahalchari waterway, Chittagong Hill Tracts. |
| 1971 | 5 May | Gopalpur massacre, workers slain by the Pakistani Army |
| 1971 | 20 May | Chuknagar massacre by the Pakistan Army. |
| 1971 | 24 May | Swadhin Bangla Betar Kendra radio station established in Kolkata. |
| 1971 | 11 July | Sector Commanders Conference 1971. (to 17 July) |
| 1971 | 16 August | Operation Jackpot, Bangladesh naval commando operation with assistance of RAW. |
| 1971 | 20 August | Flight Lieutenant Matiur Rahman attempts to defect after hijacking a fighter plane. |
| 1971 | 5 September | Battle of Goahati, Jessore. |
| 1971 | 28 September | Bangladesh Air Force functional. |
| 1971 | 13 October | Dhaka guerrillas kill Abdul Monem Khan, governor of East Pakistan. |
| 1971 | 28 October | Battle of Dhalai Outpost, Srimongol. |
| 1971 | 9 November | Six small ships constitute the first fleet of Bangladesh Navy. |
| 1971 | 16 November | Battle of Ajmiriganj, an 18‑hour encounter between Mukti Bahini Freedom Fighters and the Pakistan army. |
| 1971 | 20 November | Battle of Garibpur between India and the Pakistan Army. (to 21 November) |
| 1971 | 21 November | Mitro Bahini, a joint force of Bangladesh and Indian troops formed. |
| 1971 | 22 November | Battle of Boyra, involving Pakistani and Indian air force. |
| 1971 | 3 December | Indo-Pakistani War of 1971 breaks out. Bangladesh Air Force destroys Pakistani oil depots. |
| 1971 | 4 December | India officially invades East Pakistan. |
| 1971 | 6 December | India becomes the first country to recognize Bangladesh. Swadhin Bangla Betar Kendra radio station becomes Bangladesh Betar. |
| 1971 | 7 December | Liberation of Jessore, Sylhet and the Moulovi Bazar. |
| 1971 | 9 December | Chandpur and Daudkandi liberated. |
| 1971 | 10 December | Liberation of Laksham. Two Bangladeshi ships sunk mistakenly by Indian air attack. |
| 1971 | 11 December | Liberation of Hilli, Mymensingh, Kushtia and Noakhali. |
| 1971 | 14 December | Selective genocide of Bengali intellectuals, liberation of Bogra. |
| 1971 | 16 December | Surrender of the Pakistan army and liberation of Dhaka by Indian army and Muktibahini. |
| | 22 December | The Provisional Government of Bangladesh arrives in Dhaka from exile. |
| 1972 | 9 February | The 25-year Indo-Bangladeshi Treaty of Friendship, Cooperation and Peace is signed in Dhaka. |
| 1972 | 10 January | Sheikh Mujibur Rahman returns to Bangladesh. |
| 1972 | 17 March | Indian Army leaves Dhaka. |
| 1972 | 19 March | The prime ministers of Bangladesh and India sign the Joint River Commission bilateral working group. |
| 1972 | 4 November | Constitution of the People's Republic of Bangladesh is adopted by the Assembly. |
| 1972 | 16 December | Constitution of Bangladesh becomes effective. |
| 1973 | 7 March | First general election in Bangladesh is held, Bangladesh Awami League secures a majority. |
| 1973 | 6 September | Bangladesh joins the Non-Aligned Movement(NAM). |
| 1973 | 15 December | Gallantry awards for wartime service published in the Bangladesh Gazette. |
| 1974 | | Bangladesh famine of 1974 cause the deaths of over one million people. |
| 1974 | 22 February | Pakistan recognizes Bangladesh. |
| 1974 | 9 April | A tripartite agreement is signed between Bangladesh, India and Pakistan regarding post-war humanitarian issues. |
| 1974 | 17 September | Bangladesh joins the United Nations (UN). |
| 1974 | 28 December | Sheikh Mujibur Rahman declares a state of emergency. |
| 1975 | 25 January | A fourth amendment to the constitution abolishes the parliamentary system and establishes a presidential system in its place. |
| 1975 | 25 February | Bangladesh Krishak Sramik Awami League (BAKSAL) established under the leadership of Sheikh Mujibur Rahman as the single legitimate political party. |
| 1975 | 15 August | Assassination of Sheikh Mujibur Rahman. |
| 1975 | 3 November | On Jail Killing Day, four leaders of the liberation war are assassinated in prison. |
| 1975 | 7 November | Major General Ziaur Rahman becomes deputy Martial Law Administrator. |
| 1976 | 21 July | Lieutenant Colonel. Abu Taher was sentenced to death for overthrowing the government and destroying the armed forces. |
| 1976 | 29 August | Death of national poet Kazi Nazrul Islam. |
| 1977 | 21 April | Zia-ur Rahman replaces Sayem as president. |
| 1977 | 30 May | Zia-ur Rahman gains 98.9 percent of votes in a referendum on his continuance as president. |
| 1977 | 3 June | Supreme Court justice Abdus Sattar becomes vice president. |
| 1977 | 1 September | Formation of the Bangladesh Nationalist Party (BNP). |
| 1977 | 28 September | Japanese Red Army terrorist group forces a hijacked Japan Airlines Flight to land in Dhaka. |
| 1978 | | Bangladesh is elected to a two-year term on the UN Security Council. |
| 1978 | 3 June | Zia-ur Rahman wins presidential election and secures his position for a five-year term. |
| 1979 | 18 February | The 1979 General Election takes place. Bangladesh Nationalist Party led by Zia scores a decisive victory. |
| 1981 | 30 May | Assassination of Ziaur Rahman. |
| 1982 | 24 March | Lieutenant General Hussain Muhammad Ershad assumes power after a bloodless coup. |
| 1982 | 4 October | Bangladesh signs a memorandum of understanding with India on water sharing over the following two years. |
| 1983 | 11 December | Hussain Muhammad Ershad takes over as president. |
| 1986 | 7 May | At the 1986 General Election, a victory by the Jatiya Party consolidates Ershad's position. |
| 1987 | 7 December | Ershad dissolves parliament under opposition pressure. |
| 1988 | 3 March | Jatiya Party gains an overwhelming majority in the General Election with 68.44% of the votes. |
| 1988 | 2 December | A devastating cyclone strikes Bangladesh. |
| 1989 | 30 October-17 November | 1989 Bangladesh riots |
| 1990 | 6 December | Ershad offers resignation. |
| 1991 | 27 February | 1991 Bangladeshi general election, Bangladesh Nationalist party snatches victory. |
| 1991 | 29 April | 1991 Bangladesh cyclone kills more than 138,000. |
| 1996 | 14 May | Over 400 are killed as a tornado strikes northern Bangladesh. |
| 1996 | 19 May | Failed attempt of coup d'état by Lt. Gen. Abu Saleh Mohammad Nasim, Bir Bikram. |
| 1996 | 12 June | General election of '96, Bangladesh Awami League gains majority. |
| 1996 | 12 December | India and Bangladesh sign a 30-year treaty on Ganges water sharing. |
| 1997 | 2 December | The 'Chittagong Hill Tracts Peace Accord' is signed between Bangladesh government and Parbatya Chattagram Jana Sanghati Samiti. |
| 1999 | 28 May | Veteran Bangladeshi actor-producer Shakib Khan made his debut with the film Ananta Bhalobasha. |
| 1999 | 17 November | 21 February is declared International Mother Language Day in the 30th General Conference of UNESCO. |
| 2000 | 20 March | President Clinton becomes the first US president to visit Bangladesh. |

== 21st century ==
=== 2000s Decade ===
| Year | Date | Event |
|---|---|---|
| 2001 | 1 October | Bangladesh Nationalist Party secures a decisive victory at the Eighth General Election. |
| 2002 | 1 January | Sale of polythene bags banned in Dhaka for environmental reasons. |
| 2002 | 5 February | Death penalty introduced for acid attacks. |
| 2002 | 29 August | Transparency International lists Bangladesh amongst the most corrupt nations. |
| 2004 | 20 May | Terrorist attack on British High Commissioner in Sylhet. |
| 2004 | 21 August | 2004 Dhaka grenade attack by terrorist organization Harkat-ul-Jihad-al-Islami (HUJI). |
| 2005 | 27 January | Shah A M S Kibria assassinated in a grenade attack in the Habiganj District, Sylhet. |
| 2005 | 25 February | Bangladesh peacekeepers ambushed and killed in the Democratic Republic of the Congo. |
| 2005 | 6 March | Terrorist leader Siddique ul-Islam captured. |
| 2005 | 17 August | Terrorist group JMB simultaneously detonates 500 bombs in 300 different locations. |
| 2006 | | Grameen Bank and Muhammad Yunus are awarded the Nobel Peace Prize. |
| 2006 | 2 March | Terrorist leader Shaykh Abdur Rahman captured. |
| 2006 | 24 April | A training aircraft of the Bangladesh Air Force crashes in the Jhenaidah District. |
| 2006 | 24 June | Remains of Bir Sreshtho awardee Matiur Rahman are brought back to Bangladesh. |
| 2007 | 11 January | President Iajuddin Ahmed declares a state of emergency. |
| 2007 | 12 January | Fakhruddin Ahmed takes the oath as the Chief Adviser of the caretaker government. |
| 2007 | 30 March | Leaders of terrorist group JMJB are executed. |
| 2007 | 16 July | Sheikh Hasina arrested on extortion charges and denied bail. |
| 2007 | 3 September | Khaleda Zia arrested on corruption charges. |
| 2007 | 15 November | Cyclone Sidr hits the coast, causing the death of around 3,500 people. |
| 2007 | 10 December | Remains of Bir Sreshtho awardee Hamidur Rahman bought back to Bangladesh and reinterred next to Bir Shrestho Matiur Rahman. |
| 2008 | 11 June | Sheikh Hasina released on parole and flown out to the US for medical treatment. |
| 2008 | 29 December | Bangladesh Awami League secures a landslide victory in 2008 Bangladeshi general election. Sheikh Hasina becomes prime minister for the second time. |
| 2009 | 25-27 February | Mutiny staged by paramilitary force Bangladesh Rifles. |
| 2009 | 25 May | Cyclone Aila ravages the south-west coast. |
| 2009 | 19 November | Verdict on the assassination of Sheikh Mujibur Rahman in the Bangabandhu Murder Case. |

=== 2010s Decade ===
| Year | Date | Event |
|---|---|---|
| 2010 | 28 January | Execution of five condemned killers of Bangabandhu Sheikh Mujibur Rahman. |
| 2010 | 24 March | Tiny South Talpatti Island off the coast of Bengal disappears, washed away thirty years after the mud flat island was created by delta currents, ending the Indian and Bangladeshi dispute over the territory. |
| 2011 | 17 February | Widespread outrage at the killing of Felani Khatun a 15-year-old Bangladeshi girl, who was shot and killed by India's Border Security Force (BSF), at India-Bangladesh border. |
| 2011 | 17 February | Bangladesh co-hosts the ICC Cricket World Cup with India and Sri Lanka. |
| 2011 | 5 September | India and Bangladesh sign a pact to end their 40-year border demarcation dispute. |
| 2012 | 18 January | Bangladesh Army claimed to have foiled a coup d'état attempt. |
| 2012 | 24 November | Garments factory fire at Tazreen Fashion factory in Ashulia kills 117. |
| 2013 | 24 April | Garments factory collapse at Savar claims 1,134 lives. |
| 2014 | 5 January | 2014 Bangladeshi general election. Landslide Awami League victory. Sheikh Hasina elected for the third term as prime minister. |
| 2016 | 1-2 July | Terrorist attack and hostage crisis at Holey Artisan Bakery in Dhaka culminating in the death of 29. |
| 2017 | 25 August | Rohingya refugee crisis breaks out. Over 700,000 refugees flee to Bangladesh over the next four months. |
| 2018 | 30 December | 2018 Bangladeshi general election. Landslide Awami League victory. Sheikh Hasina elected for the fourth term as prime minister. |
| 2019 | 27 November | Seven terrorists sentenced to death for the July 2016 Dhaka attack. |
| 2020 | 8 March | First three confirmed cases of COVID-19 in Bangladesh. |
| 2020 | 18 March | First confirmed COVID-19 death in Bangladesh. |
| 2020 | 20 May | Cyclone Amphan ravages West Bengal and south-western coast of Bangladesh. |
| 2023 | 29 June | The highest grossing Bangladeshi film of all-time Priyotoma was released. |
| 2024 | 5 August | Sheikh Hasina resigns as prime minister and flees to India because of 2024 Non-cooperation movement while her official residence is stormed by protesters. |
| 2024 | 26 December | Bangladesh Secretariat torched at 1:52 AM approximately |

== See also ==
- List of years in Bangladesh
- Timeline of the Bangladesh Liberation War
- Timeline of Dhaka
- Timeline of the COVID-19 pandemic in Bangladesh
- List of timelines
