= Dhaka riots =

Dhaka riots may refer to these riots in Dhaka:

- 1930 Dhaka riots
- 1969 Dhaka riots
