= Military history of Bangladesh =

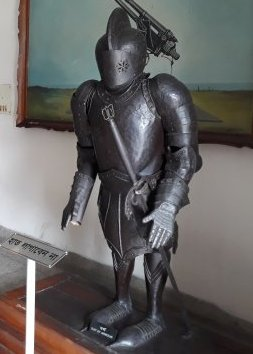
Medieval armour preserved in the Bangladesh Military Museum

Bangladesh's military history is intertwined with the history of a larger region, including present-day India, Pakistan, Nepal, Bhutan and Myanmar. The country was historically part of Bengal – a major power in between South Asia and Southeast Asia.

Muslims brought new military technology to the region after the 12th century. According to João de Barros, Bengal enjoyed military supremacy over Arakan and Tripura due to good artillery. Its forces possessed large guns and cannons. It was also a major exporter of gunpowder and saltpeter to Europe. Bengal had a cosmopolitan military, including Muslims, Hindus, Buddhists and mercenaries from Africa, Central and West Asia. The Bengal Sultanate was a powerful kingdom between the 14th and 15th centuries. Bengal became an integral part of the Mughal Empire in the 16th century. The Mughal Army built fortifications across the region and expelled Arakanese and Portuguese pirates from the northeastern coastline of the Bay of Bengal. Throughout the late medieval and early modern periods, Bengal was notable for its navy and shipbuilding. Its shipyards produced ships for the Mughal, Ottoman and British navies.

A Bengal Army was established by the British East India Company in 1756, including native and European infantry. The native infantry included Bengalis, Punjabis and Gurkhas. The Bengal Army was merged into the British Indian Army after the Indian Rebellion of 1857.The British Indian Army participated in World War I and World War II. Bengali veterans of the Burma Campaign served in the Pakistan Armed Forces after the partition of India. Amid the Bangladesh Liberation War and a genocide by West Pakistan in 1971, the Bangladeshi military was formed by defecting regiments in East Pakistan, led by the East Bengal Regiment. The guerrilla Mukti Bahini played an important role during the war of independence. In the late 1970s and 1980s, the Bangladeshi military saw several insurrections as the country endured dictatorship. Since the restoration of parliamentary democracy in 1991, the Bangladesh Armed Forces have been subordinate to the civilian governments, including political and technocratic governments.

Since contributing forces to the Second Gulf War in 1991 and U.S-led Intervention in Haiti (Operation Uphold Democracy) in 1994, Bangladesh has become a major contributor in UN Peacekeeping. Bangladeshi peacekeepers have served in the Balkans, Africa, the Middle East and the Caribbean. Its recent domestic military history has focused on counter-insurgency, counter-terrorism and maritime security operations.

The 2008 Bangladesh–Myanmar naval standoff was a notable event of modern Bangladeshi military history.

== Ancient history ==
=== Independent Pundravardhana and Vanga Kingdom ===
Pundra kingdom and Vanga kingdom were recorded to be the most well known ancient empires located in North Bengal and South-West Bengal (Parts of Bangladesh). During the Kurukshetra War, Both the Pundras and Vangas fought on side of Kauravas. However, the Kauravas could lose the war and the Kuru kingdom under Pandu's leadership could also go defeat both the Pundras and Vangas (present-day Bangladesh). However, instead of quickly annexed, Pundravardhana and Vanga kingdom remained self-governed until Arjuna started a post-war military campaigns which could included Pundras as well as Vangas. They were conquered alongside with others regions in Indian subcontinent during the campaign.

=== Under Middle Kingdoms of India ===
Kuru kingdom, who had partially controlled most of Bengal could be defeated by Mahapadma Nanda, king of Nanda Empire. After the eventual defeat and he annexed the Kurus in 345-340 BCE, ending its self-determination dynasty.According to most historians, the early military history of the Indian subcontinent included Alexander's invasion of India, which was deterred by the might of Gangaridai Kingdom, as it was located in present-day Bangladesh. The Gangaridai's strategic position on the Ganges made it a significant power in eastern area.

=== Independent Gauda Kingdom ===
Before 550s AD, Gauda operated as an independent state in the 4th century AD. Though the Guptas invasion could end there sovereignty. However, after the breakaway of Gupta Empire, Eastern Bengal could be splintered into the kingdoms of Vanga, Samatata and Harikela. Meanwhile, the Gauda kings again rose in the west with their capital at Karnasuvarna. King Shashanka created the first independent unified polity in the Bengal region, which was located in present-day Bangladesh. Shanshanka led various military operations, extenting his territorial might. He also annexed Vanga kingdom during his campaigns. His major military campaigns and confrontations were against Kamarupas, Maukharis, Pushyabhutis. By the end of his reign, his domain stretched from Vanga to Bhuvanesha while in the east, his kingdom bordered Kamarupa.Following his death, Shashanka was succeeded by his son, Manava, who ruled the kingdom for eight months. However Gauda was soon divided amongst Harshavardhana and Bhaskarvarmana of Kamarupa, after one of them deposed Manava.

Prince Vijaya of the Vanga Kingdom led a naval expedition to conquer Sri Lanka.The Kalinga War was a notable event of the Mauryan Empire's military campaign in the eastern Indian subcontinent which included present-day Bangladesh. The ancient Indian armies used chariots and gigantic war elephants during the period.

== Early Medieval period ==
=== Independent Pala Empire ===
The Bengal region crystallized as an imperial power during the 8th-11th century Pala Empire. Many of the empire's cities are located in Bangladesh. The Pala military had a large war elephant cavalry, according to Arab historians. The Palas recruited mercenaries from different parts of the Indian subcontinent. Pala conquests extended across North India. The Palas were engaged in a struggle over the Kannauj Triangle with the Gurjara-Pratiharas and Rashtrakutas.

=== Under Ghurid Empire ===
The Muslim conquest of the Indian subcontinent heralded new military doctrines and hardware, including well-developed artillery. The Delhi Sultanate conquered Bengal in 1204 under the leadership of Bakhtiar Khilji, who later proceeded with an Islamic invasion of Tibet. In Bengal, the Delhi Sultanate displaced the Sena dynasty. Sultan Iwas Khilji (1212–1227) was responsible for founding the Bengal navy during the sultanate period. The chief of the admiralty had various responsibilities, including shipbuilding, transporting personnel, elephants and equipment; recruitment and collecting tolls at ghats. The sultanate period saw the settlement of many military officers and soldiers from North India, Central and West Asia and the Horn of Africa. The settlers included Rajputs and Pashtuns.

In the 14th century, Sultan Shamsuddin Firoz Shah and Hazrat Shah Jalal conquered Sylhet from Raja Gour Govinda; Sultan Fakhruddin Mubarak Shah conquered Chittagong from the Kingdom of Tripura. Shamsuddin Ilyas Shah became known as the Alexander of the eastern subcontinent after sacking Kathmandu, Varanasi and Cuttack.

=== Bengal Sultanate ===
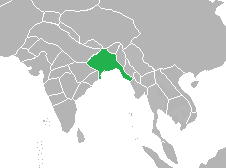
The Bengal Sultanate

The Bengal Sultanate was a medieval great power and conducted a number of notable campaigns, including the Bengal Sultanate-Delhi Sultanate War, the Bengal Sultanate-Jaunpur Sultanate War, the Reconquest of Arakan, the Bengal Sultanate-Kamata Kingdom War and the Bengal Sultanate-Kingdom of Mrauk U War of 1512–1516. The naval strength of Bengal was notable during the Ilyas Shahi dynasty and the Hussain Shahi dynasty.

==== Invasion of Sher Shah ====
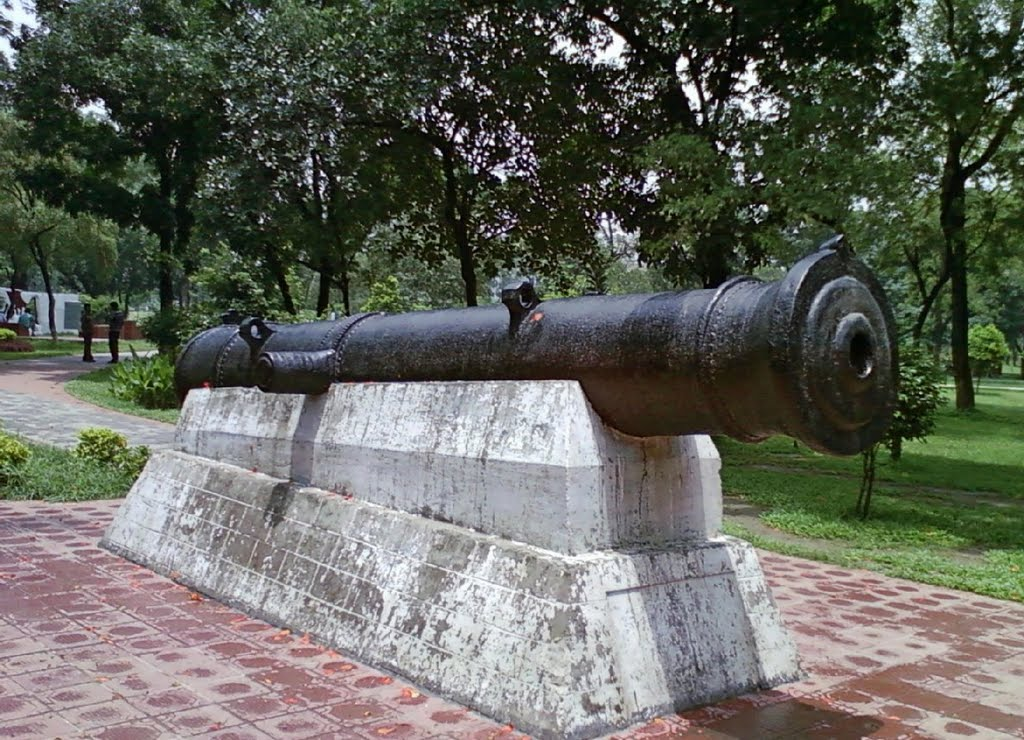
The Bibi Mariam Cannon

Sher Shah Suri conquered Bengal in the 16th century and made it part of the Suri Empire. Sher Shah Suri also renovated the Grand Trunk Road around Sonargaon. His successors later revived the Bengal Sultanate.

==== Isa Khan's campaigns ====
After the Bengal Sultanate collapsed in the late 16th-century, the aristocrat Isa Khan led a confederation of zamindars (known as Baro-Bhuyan) to challenge the Mughal invasion of Bengal, often with naval battles on the Padma River, Meghna River and Jangalbari Fort in Egarasindhur. Isa Khan defeated Mughal governors Khan Jahan I in 1578, Shahbaz Khan in 1584 and Man Singh I in 1594. His son and successor Musa Khan continued to lead the confederation until succumbing to the Mughals led by Islam Khan I in 1610.

== Renaissance period ==
=== Under Mughal Empire ===
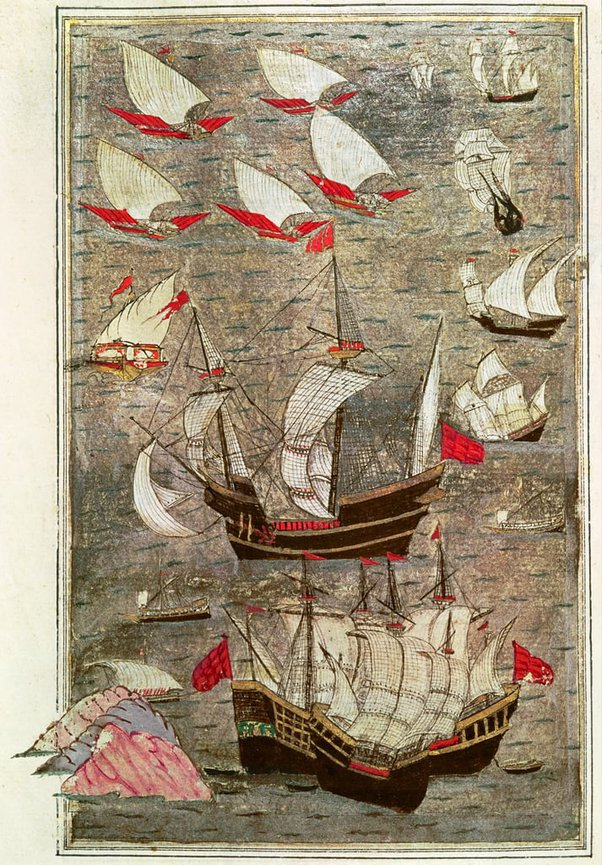
During the 17th century, Ottoman navy vessels were built in Bangladesh

Bengal remained relatively stable and prosperous during the 17th century. A key challenge during the early Mughal period was piracy from the Kingdom of Mrauk U and the Portuguese settlement in Chittagong. In 1666, the Mughal Empire-Kingdom of Mrauk U War expelled the Arakanese and Portuguese from Chittagong. The Mughals also engaged in the Ahom-Mughal conflicts. During the 18th century, Bengal endured the invasions by the Maratha Army - constantly defeating the military of the Maratha Confederacy. It fell to the conquest of the British East India Company after the Battle of Plassey.

==== Forts ====
Mud forts were common in Bengal, such as the Ekdala Fort used in the Bengal Sultanate-Delhi Sultanate War. By the 17th century, the Mughals constructed a series of riverside fortifications in the Bengal delta. Some of the surviving forts include the following.

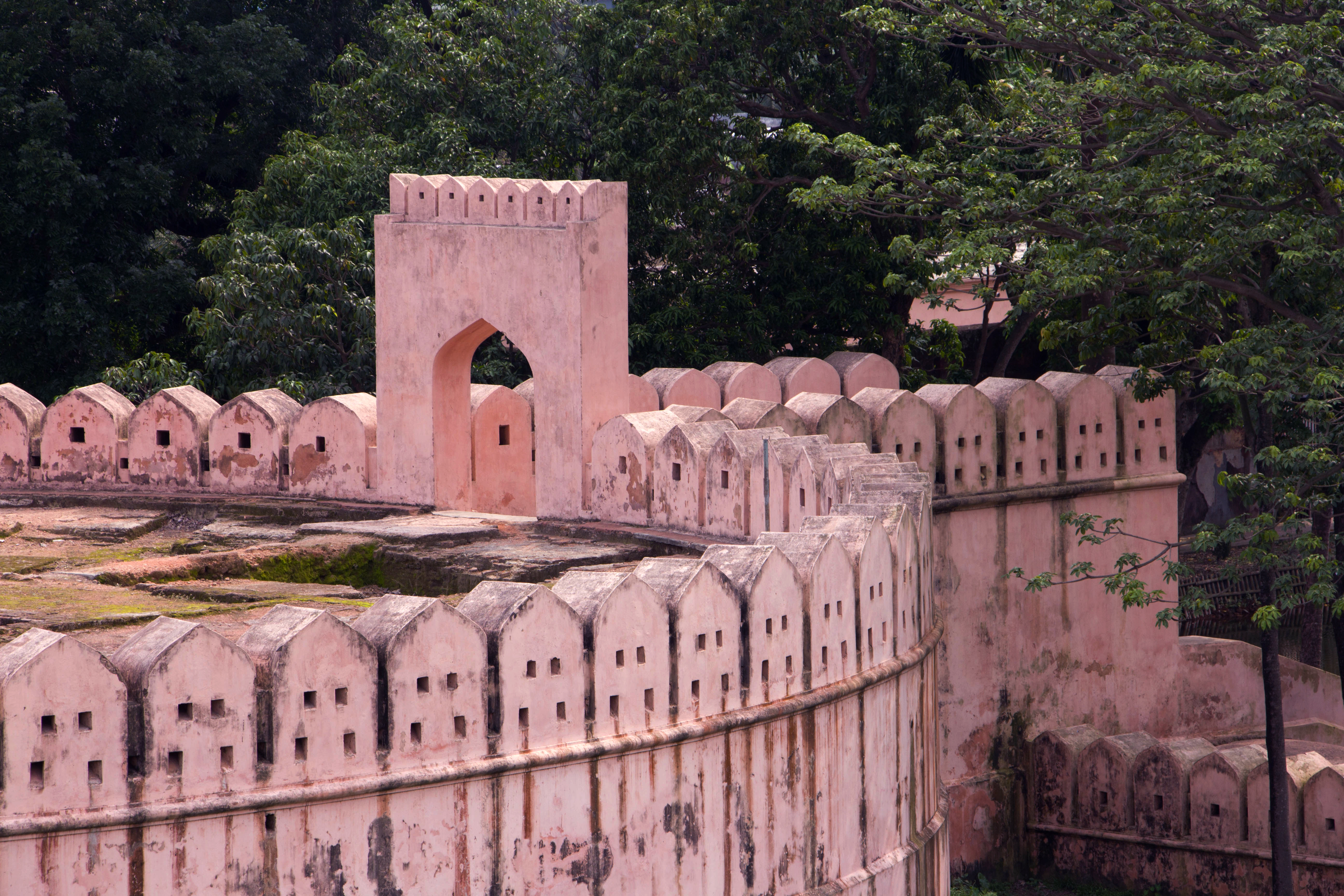
Idrakpur Fort, Munshiganj

- Mahasthangarh
- Idrakpur Fort
- Sonakanda Fort
- Hajiganj Fort
- Lalbagh Fort
- Jangalbari Fort

==== Artillery ====
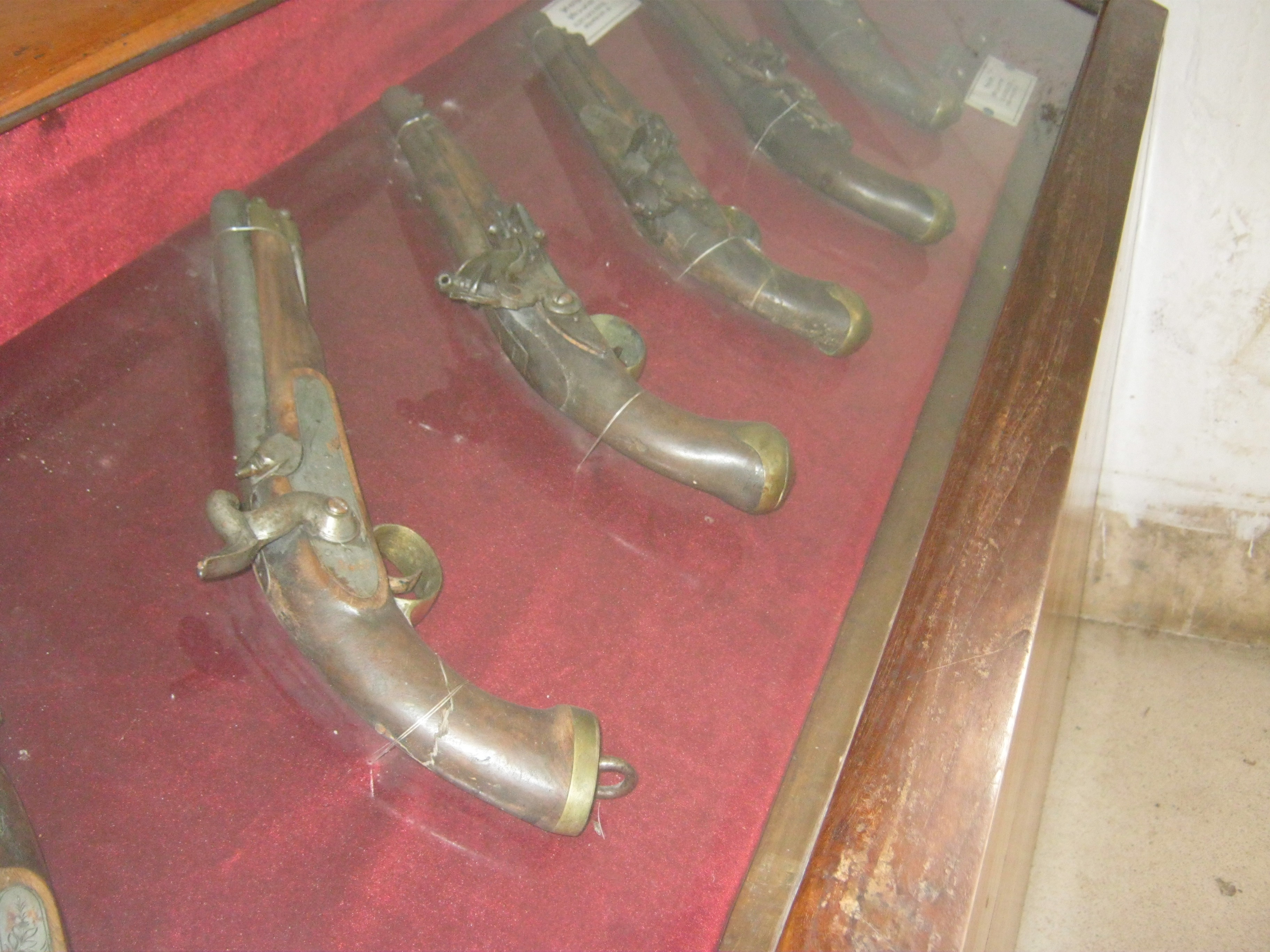
Guns preserved in the Lalbagh Fort Museum

The artillery was a vital part of the Bengal military. The Mughal emperor Babur saw it as a very effective part of the Bengal army. Portuguese historian João de Barros opined that the military supremacy of the Bengal army over that of Arakan and Tripura was due to the efficiency of its artillery. The artillery used cannons and guns of various sizes. The Bibi Mariam Cannon and the Jahan Kosha Cannon are examples of early modern Bengali artillery.

Bengal was a major exporter of gunpowder and saltpeter to Europe until the 19th century.

==== Mercenaries ====
Foreign mercenaries were an important part of the Bengal Sultanate army. Bengal recruited mercenaries from Abyssinia.

==== Shipbuilding ====
In the 14th century, Ibn Battuta reported of large fleets of war boats in the Bengal Sultanate. According to the traveler Frederick Caesar, Chittagong was a leading shipbuilding centre in the 15th century. During the 17th century, the shipyards of Chittagong were reported to have built an entire fleet of warships for the Ottoman navy. During the Mughal Empire, Bengal was the leading producer ships in the subcontinent.

The British Royal Navy had many of its ships built in Chittagong, including vessels used in the Battle of Trafalgar.

== Colonial period ==
=== Enhanced military ===
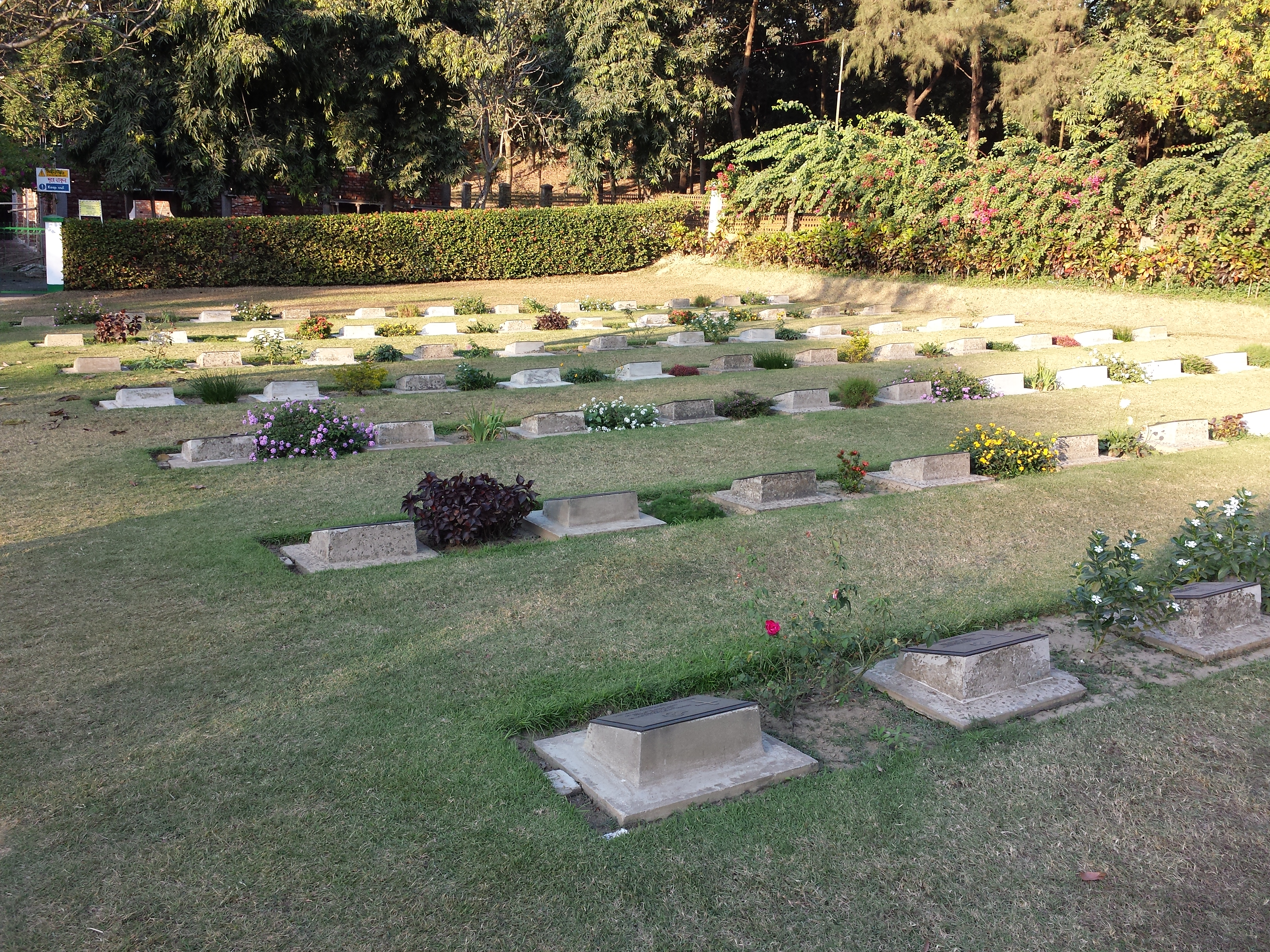
Commonwealth War Cemetery, Chittagong

The Bengal Army was formed in 1765 by the British East India Company. The first native infantry was formed in 1757. In the 19th century, the Bengal Army was merged into the British Indian Army under the British Raj. The Royal Indian Navy was formed in 1830. The Royal Indian Air Force was formed in 1932. The Bangladesh Armed Forces were raised from the armed forces of the British Raj, which included the Bengal Regiment and major installations such as the Dhaka Cantonment, Chittagong Cantonment and the Bogra Cantonment. Various units of artillery, engineers, guides and horse infantry could be addedThe following includes a list of conflicts which occurred within the territory of Bangladesh under British rule.

=== Unification with main army ===
In 1895, the three separate Presidency Armies began a process of unification which was not to be concluded until the Kitchener reforms of eight years later. In 1903 the separately numbered regiments of the Bombay, Madras and Bengal armies were unified in a single organisational sequence and the presidency affiliations disappeared. The Bengal infantry units in existence at the end of the Presidency era continued as the senior regiments (1st Brahmans to 48th Pioneers) of the newly unified Indian Army.

=== Armed conflicts ===
- Seven Years' War
  - Siege of Calcutta, attempt by the last Nawab of Bengal to recapture Fort William from the East India Company.
  - Battle of Plassey- defection of Mir Jafar causes defeat of Siraj-ud-Daulah, the last independent Nawab of Bengal.
  - Battle of Buxer- Mir Qasim rebels against East India Company after clash of interest, gets defeated.
- Anglo-Nepalese War- leads to Treaty of Sugali with Nepal and Treaty of Titalia (signed in Tetulia) with Sikkim.
- First Anglo-Burmese War- Burmese forces invade Chittagong Division.
- Indian Rebellion of 1857- includes revolt by the Bengal Army in Dhaka, Chittagong and Sylhet.
- Bhutan War- Bhutan loses control of Bengal Duars, including parts of Panchagarh District.
- Burma Campaign- Allied Forces of World War II stationed in Chittagong, Comilla, Dhaka and Sylhet; Imperial Japanese Army Air Service bombs Chittagong.

There was strong opposition to British involvement against the Turkish War of Independence, as both Mustafa Kemal Atatürk and the Ottoman caliphate enjoyed support in Bengal.

| Name of Conflict | Belligerents | | Outcome |
| Name of Conflict | Allies | Opponent(s) | Outcome |
|---|---|---|---|
| First Anglo-Bengal War | East India Company | Bengal Subah | Stalemate: Calcutta city recaptured by Bengal Subah; Treaty of Alinagar |
| Second Anglo-Bengal War | East India Company Bengal defectors | Bengal Subah Kingdom of France | Victory: Execution of Siraj ul Dulla.; Mir Jafar installed as Nawab by East India Company. |
| Third Anglo-Bengal War | East India Company | Mughal Empire: Bengal Subah | Victory: Revolt suppressed by Mir Qasim; Treaty of Allahabad |
| Anglo-Nepalese War | East India Company | Kingdom of Nepal | Victory: Treaty of Sugali and Treaty of Titalia. |
| Indian Rebellion of 1857 | East India Company | Various factions | Victory: Revolt suppressed. |
| Bhutan War (1864–1865) | India | Bhutan | Victory: Bhutanese territorial cessions to India. |
| First Anglo-Burmese War (1885) | India | Burmese Empire | Victory: The province of Burma became part of the British Raj. |
| Burma campaign (1941-1945) | United States United Kingdom: India; Taiwan; South Africa | Japan: Manchukuo; Mengjiang; (India) Azad Hind; Thailand; State of Burma | Victory: Allied victory in Burma campaign.; Allied victory in WWII.; Imperial Japan becomes last country to surrender. |

== Under Pakistani rule ==
=== Frail military wing ===
With the partition of India on 15 August 1947 the territory constituting modern Bangladesh was partitioned from the province of Bengal as East Bengal later named as East Pakistan joined the newly created state of Pakistan. Ethnic and sectional discrimination hampered the role and function of the Pakistani military. Bengalis were under-represented in the Pakistan military. Officers of Bengali origin in the different wings of the armed forces made up just 5% of overall force by 1965. West Pakistanis believed that Bengalis were not "martially inclined" unlike Pashtuns and Punjabis. The "Martial Races" notion, however, has been dismissed by virtually all credible historians and experts as ridiculous and unfounded, noting that it was based on perceived loyalty to the British during the colonial period and later weaponised by West Pakistani authorities to sideline Bengalis. Moreover, despite huge defence spending, East Pakistan received almost none of the benefits, such as contracts, purchasing and military support jobs were not given to Bengalis. The Indo-Pakistani War of 1965 over Kashmir also highlighted the sense of military insecurity among Bengalis as only an under-strength infantry division and small amount of combat aircraft without tank support were in East Pakistan to thwart any Indian retaliations during the conflict. Khwaja Wasiuddin was the most senior Bengali officer in the Pakistani military.

The East's military capability were extremely low. Following the structure of security forces in East Pakistan had at its peak were:-

- Eastern Command (Part of Pakistan Army in East Pakistan) - 150,000 troops
  - East Bengal Regiment (Paramilitary forces) - 6,000 troops
  - East Pakistan Rifles/East Pakistan Civil Armed Force (Paramilitary forces) - 25,000 troops
- PAF combatant squadron - 1
  - 17 aircraft (15 combat aircraft by 1965)
- 1 destroyer warship
- 1 submarine
- Law enforcement - 100,000+ members
  - East Pakistan Police - 45,000 members
  - East Pakistan Ansar - 118,000 members

=== Notable commanders ===
- Mohammad Ishfaqul Mazid.
- M. A. G. Osmani.
- Colonel Shafaat Jamil.
- Khaled Mosharraf.
- Mahmudur Rahman Majumdar.

=== Armed conflicts ===
During the Pakistan era, East Pakistan was a quiet front compared to the more dynamic western front on Kashmir dispute. Despite no real issue on military perspective, internal conflicts and border conflicts could bring problems due to political environment. Old Communism influence in Bengal and new rise of self nationalism became a major problem for the newly united Pakistan, aimed for a nation built on Muslim majority. Internal movements like Nachole Uprising in the Rajshahi Division and 1969 mass uprising knock of but security forces suppressed such attempts. At the same time Pakistan, after its birth, could aid the Rohingya Mujahedeens in Arakan. Though that support could end after a MoUs signing between Pakistan and Burma in 1950 which includes giving rights to Rohingya peoples. A serious border clash could also erupt between East Pakistan troops and Indian troops at Lakshmipur in 1958. During 1965, frequent border clash and aerial combat could happen until the war ends although the area was isolated enough. East Pakistan would dissolves after years of ethnic discrimination and the start of Operation Searchlight which could lead to 9-months of civil war and the defeat of Pakistani forces in the East.

== Independent Bangladesh ==
=== Liberation War ===
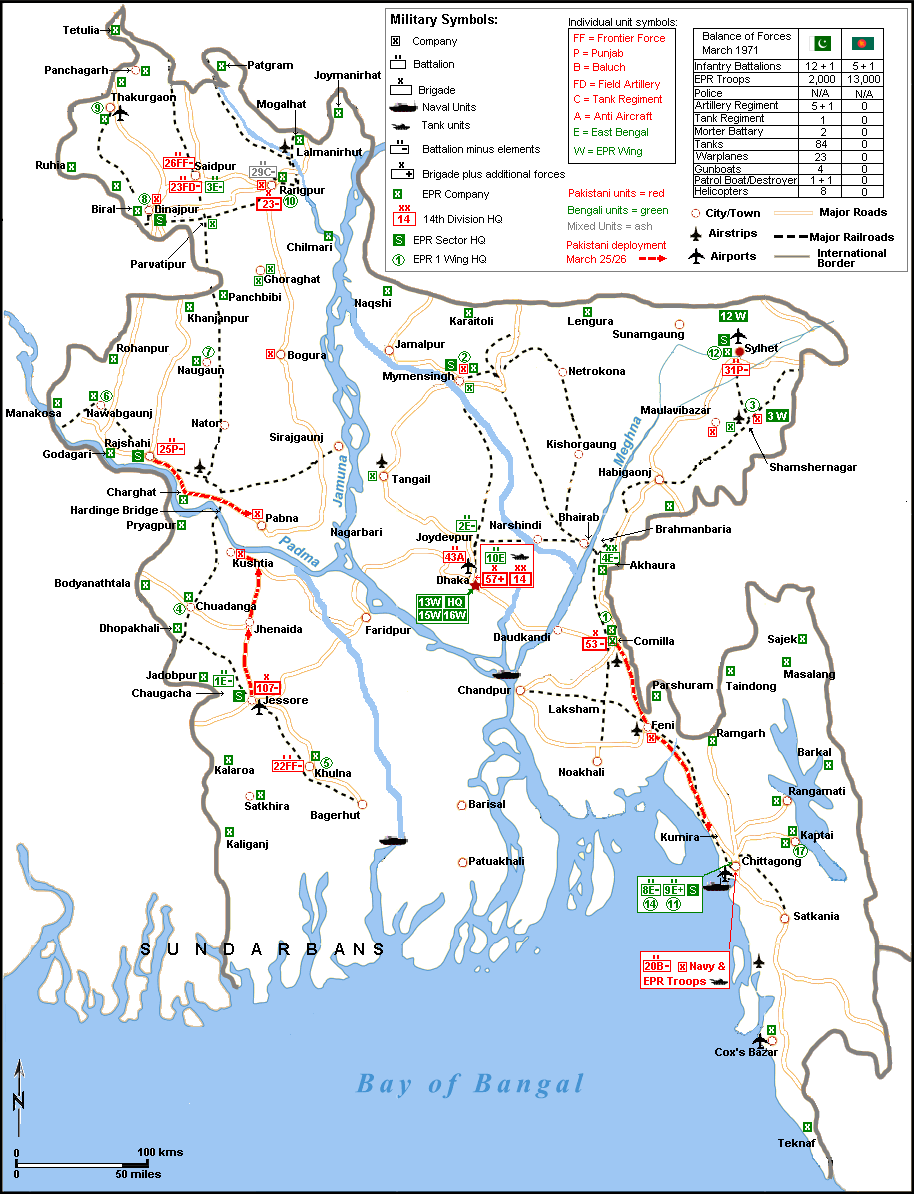
Location of Bengali and Pakistani military units in March 1971

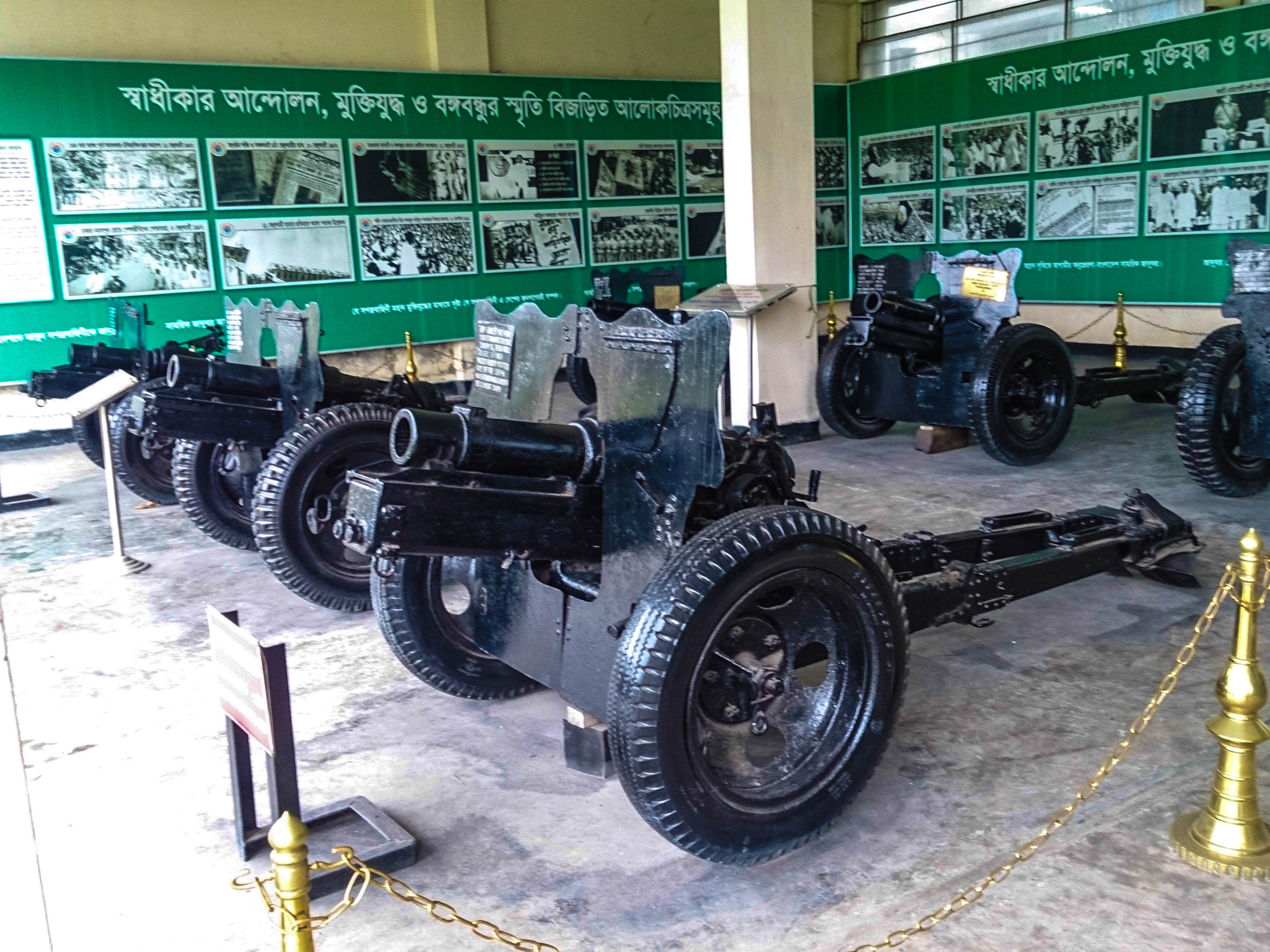
QF 3.7-inch mountain howitzers used by the Mukti Bahini

Following the victory of the Awami League in the 1970 elections, then-president General Yahya Khan refused to appoint its leader Sheikh Mujibur Rahman as the prime minister and launched a brutal attack named Operation Searchlight on the civilians of the then East Pakistan, using the Pakistani army to repress political movements. Figures of people killed by Pakistani forces vary from a minimum of around 300,000 to a maximum of around 3 million. Responding to Mujib's call for rebellion, many students, workers and other civilians mutinied against Pakistan and raised the Mukti Bahini, a guerrilla force. Later on, many Bengali officers and units from Pakistan Army and East Pakistan Rifles mutinied against their West Pakistani counterparts and joined the Mukti bahini. On 17 April 1971, Muhammad Ataul Gani Osmani took oath as the commander-in-chief of Mukti bahini. While the war raged on, the necessity of a well-trained armed force was always felt. During the first Bangladesh Sector Commanders Conference, held from 11 to 17 July 1971, the Bangladesh Forces was formed from the revolting Bengali members of the Pakistan Army and EPR. In this historic conference the field command structure, sector reorganisation, reinforcement, appointment of field commanders and tactics of warfare were decided upon and carried out. On 21 November 1971, the Bangladesh Forces was divided into three separate services as Bangladesh Army, Bangladesh Navy and Bangladesh Air Force.

The Bangladesh Forces received modest assistance from the Indian Government soon after the start of the war. On 3 December 1971, India-Pakistan war broke out and Indian troops enter Bangladesh allied with the Bangladesh Armed Forces. On 16 December 1971 the Pakistani Military force in Bangladesh surrender to a joint force of Indian and Bangladesh forces.

=== Post-independence ===
The newly formed Bangladeshi armed forces incorporated some of the units and guerrillas of the Mukti Bahini. Gen. Osmani, who had led the Mukti Bahini was appointed the General of the Bangladesh armed forces. For many years, there was active discrimination in favour of the inductees from the Mukti Bahini against those Bengali officers who had continued service in the Pakistani armed forces or had been detained in West Pakistan. A group of angered officers assassinated the president Sheikh Mujib on 15 August 1975 and established a regime with politician Khondaker Mostaq Ahmed as President of Bangladesh and new army chief Maj. Gen. Ziaur Rahman. The military itself was subject of divisions as Mujib's assassins were overthrown by the pro-Mujib Brig. Gen. Khaled Mosharraf on 3 November, who himself was soon overthrown by a socialist group of officers under Col. Abu Taher on 7 November who returned Ziaur Rahman to power—an event now called the Sipoy-Janata Biplob (Soldiers and People's Coup). Under the presidency of Ziaur Rahman, the military was reorganised to remove conflicts between rival factions and discontented cadre. However, Ziaur Rahman was himself overthrown in a 1981 coup attempt, and a year later, Lt. Gen. Hossain Mohammad Ershad took power from the elected government of president Abdus Sattar. The military remained the most important force in national politics under the regimes of Ziaur Rahman and later Hossain Mohammad Ershad until democracy was restored in 1991.

=== Modern period ===
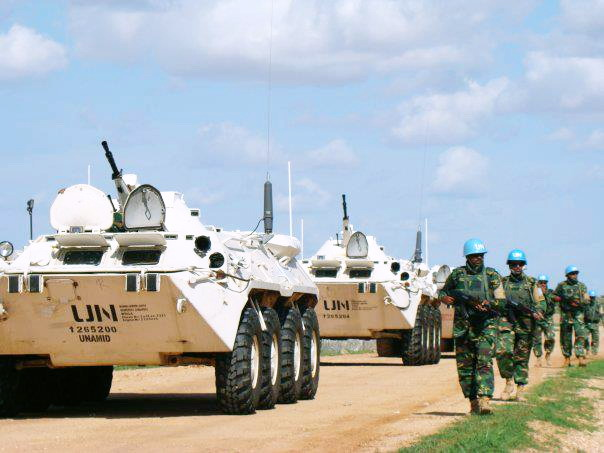
Bangladeshi peacekeepers in Darfur, Sudan

Having relied primarily on Soviet Union for military aid, Bangladesh has also developed military ties with the People's Republic of China and the United States. The Bangladesh Army has been actively involved in United Nations Peace Support Operations (UNPSO). During the first Gulf War in 1991, the Bangladesh Army sent a 2,193 member team to monitor peace in Saudi Arabia and Kuwait. The Bangladesh Army also participated in peace keeping activities in Namibia, Cambodia, Somalia, Uganda, Rwanda, Mozambique, former Yugoslavia, Liberia, Haiti, Tajikistan, Western Sahara, Sierra Leone, Kosovo, Georgia, East Timor, Congo, Côte d'Ivoire and Ethiopia. As of October 2008, Bangladesh remained the second largest contributor with 9,800 troops in the UN Peacekeeping forces.

Until a peace accord was signed in 1997, the Bangladeshi military engaged in counterinsurgency operations in the Chittagong Hill Tracts fighting the Shanti Bahini separatist group. In 2001, Bangladeshi military units engaged in clashes with the Indian Border Security Force (BSF) along the northern border. Controversy also emerged over possible links maintained by the Bangladeshi military and intelligence agencies with Islamic terrorist groups and anti-India secessionist outfits. Several projects and schemes aiming to expand and modernize the Bangladeshi armed forces were launched by the government of former Prime Minister Begum Khaleda Zia.

Forces Goal 2030 was launched by the government of Prime Minister Sheikh Hasina to secure new equipment for the Bangladeshi military.

==== Bangladesh-Myanmar border incidents ====
Standoffs have occasionally occurred at the Bangladesh-Myanmar border, including in 1991 and 2008. Most of the standoffs took place when Myanmar attempted to force Rohingyas into Bangladesh. In 2008, the two countries deployed warships after Myanmar attempted to explore a disputed Bay of Bengal seabed for oil and gas. The dispute was resolved at an international tribunal in 2012. Bangladesh and Myanmar have also conducted counter-insurgency operations on the border.

- 2008 Bangladesh–Myanmar naval standoff
- 2015 Bangladesh-Arakan Army border clash

== See also ==
- History of Bengal
- List of wars involving Bangladesh
- Bangladesh Armed Forces
