= List of wars involving Bangladesh =

This is a list of battles and wars that involved or occurred in Bangladesh since its formation.

Bangladesh victory

Bangladesh defeat

Another result

Ongoing conflict

== List ==
Conflict	Bangladesh and allied forces	Opposition forces	Results
Bangladeshi War of Independence (1971) Location: Bangladesh, Pakistan and Bay of Bengal	Bangladesh India (3–16 December 1971)	Pakistan	Victory: Independence of Bangladesh
Internal conflict in Bangladesh (1972–present) Location: Bangladesh	Bangladesh	Various anti-Government groups	Ongoing: First phase crushed; Establishment of military rule in Bangladesh; Second phase crushed; Signing of the Chittagong Hill Tracts Peace Accord; Preservation of the territorial integrity of Bangladesh; Third phase ongoing
Communist insurgency in Bangladesh (1972–1975) Location: Bangladesh	Bangladesh	Communist insurgents: Gonobahini; Purba Banglar Sarbahara Party	Victory: Crushing of the insurgency; Establishment of military rule in Bangladesh
Chittagong Hill Tracts Conflict (1977–1997) Location: Chittagong Hill Tracts	Bangladesh	Tribal insurgents: Shanti Bahini; Supported by: India (alleged)	Victory: Signing of the Chittagong Hill Tracts Peace Accord; Preservation of the territorial integrity of Bangladesh
Gulf War (Operation Moru-prantar) (1991) Location: Iraq and Kuwait	Bangladesh; United States; Kuwait; France; Saudi Arabia; United Kingdom and other states: Syria; Morocco; Oman; Pakistan; Canada; United Arab Emirates; Qatar; Thailand; Italy; Australia; Netherlands; Niger; Philippines; Sweden; Argentina; Senegal; Spain; Bahrain; Belgium; Poland; South Korea; Singapore; Norway; Czechoslovakia; Greece; Denmark; New Zealand; Hungary	Iraq	Victory: Iraqi withdrawal from Kuwait
Sierra Leone Civil War (1991-2002) Location: Sierra Leone	Bangladesh; Sierra Leone; Pakistan; Guinea; Nigeria; Jordan and other states: Ghana; United Kingdom; United States; Kenya; Belarus; Russia; India; Ukraine; Norway; Germany; New Zealand	RUF (Sierra Leone) AFRC (1997–2002); West Side Boys (1998–2000); Liberia (1997–2002); NPFL (1991–2002); Libya; Burkina Faso; Moldova	Victory: Rebels defeated.
1999 East Timorese crisis (1999–2005) Location: East Timor	Bangladesh; Timor-Leste; Pakistan; Malaysia; Turkey; Jordan and other states: Egypt; Tajikistan; Singapore; Senegal; Niger; Nigeria; Gambia; Benin; New Zealand; Thailand; Argentina; Australia; Austria; Bolivia; Bosnia and Herzegovina; Brazil; Bulgaria; Canada; Chile; China; Croatia; Denmark; Fiji; France; Germany; Ghana; Ireland; Italy; Japan; Kenya; Mexico; Mozambique; Namibia; Nepal; Norway; Peru; Philippines; Portugal; Russia; Samoa; Serbia and Montenegro; Slovakia; Slovenia; Spain; South Korea; Sri Lanka; Sweden; Ukraine; Uruguay; United Kingdom; United States; Vanuatu; Zambia; Zimbabwe	Pro-Indonesia militia	Victory: Stabilisation of East Timor and defeat of militia. 1 Bangladeshi killed and 1 wounded by IED
2001 Bangladesh–India border clashes (2001) Location: Kurigram	Bangladesh	India	Inconclusive: Bangladesh later agreed to return the bodies of 16 Indian soldiers the next day.
Bangladesh Rifles Revolt (2009) Location: Dhaka	Bangladesh	Mutineers from Bangladesh Rifles	Victory: Crushing of the revolt
Central African Republic Civil War (2012–present): Operation BEKPA 2; Location:Central African Republic	Central African Republic Russia; Rwanda; Bangladesh (As a part of MINUSCA)	Coalition of Patriots for Change: Republic of Logone; MPC; PRNC; Lord's Resistance Army	Ongoing: Bangladesh sent special operations forces to operate as MINUSCA in Central African Republic

== See also ==
- History of Bengal
- Military history of Bangladesh
- Bangladesh Armed Forces
