= Mymensingh Cantonment massacre =

1971 massacre of West Pakistani military personnel

- Part of Bangladesh War of Independence
- Date: 1971
- Location: Mymensingh Cantonment
- Perpetrators: East Pakistan Rifles; East Bengal Regiment; Bengali mobs
- Deaths: 100 (estimated)

On 27 March 1971, Bengali members of the East Pakistan Rifles (EPR) and East Bengal Regiment (EBR) stationed in the Mymensingh regiment centre (now known as Mymensingh Cantonment) revolted against West Pakistani officers and soldiers stationed there, in response to the Pakistani military's crackdown in Dhaka. The Mymensingh Cantonment massacre is one of the many instances of Bengali military personnel mutinying against their West Pakistani colleagues during the opening stages of the Bangladesh War of Independence.

== Massacre ==
=== Battle ===
When news of the Pakistani government's crackdown on Bengali resistance in Dhaka reached Mymensingh, Bengali members of the EPR and EBR revolted against the West Pakistani officers and soldiers stationed at the Mymensingh Cantonment. The West Pakistani officers and soldiers fought back against their attackers and resisted for several hours.

While the battle in Mymensingh Cantonment was ongoing, several thousand Bengali civilians surrounded the cantonment, and shouted slogans in support of the Bengali EPR and EBR mutineers. After the West Pakistani resistance was put down by the mutineers, the Bengali civilians swarmed into the cantonment and participated in the killings of West Pakistani officers and soldiers. Several West Pakistanis were hacked to death by mobs.

A Bengali eyewitness recalled that several wives and children of the West Pakistanis were also killed and that some women were raped.

=== Death toll ===
The death toll of the Mymensingh Cantonment massacre has never been confirmed. One eyewitness interviewed by American-Indian academic Sarmila Bose estimated that approximately 100 West Pakistani officers were killed, though Bose doubted that there were this many officers stationed at Mymensingh Cantonment.
