= Matsya Nyaya =

Indian philosophy

Matsya Nyaya (Sanskrit: मात्स्यन्याय; IAST: mātsyanyāya) is an ancient Indian philosophy which refers to the principle of the Law of Fish. It is described as the fundamental law of nature explained by the proverb of the big fish devouring the smaller fish, hence strong devour the weak. It can be equated to the 'Law of the Jungle'. In simple words, the strong dominates over the weak when there is disorder.

== Philosophy ==
The ancient Indian philosopher Chanakya (Kautilya), who was also the chief advisor of the Mauryan emperor Chandragupta Maurya, used this theory in his treatise Arthashastra to describe why a state should enhance its size and security. According to Kautilya, in absence of government or rule of law, the human society will degenerate into a state of anarchy in which the strong will destroy or exploit the weak much like how bigger fish eat smaller fish. Some consider this theory of government as based on a belief in the inevitable depravity of man. In other words, this theory proposes that government, rulers and laws are necessary to prevent this natural law of 'Matsya Nyaya' from operating in human society. Hence this explains why there is a need for a government and laws to be in place. Hence, Kautilya stresses the importance of 'danda' (strong authority), as its absence will lead to the law of fishes, i.e., anarchy.

== Verses in Arthashastra ==
Arthashastra 1.4.13-14
apraṇītaḥ tu mātsyanyāyaṃ udbhāvayati.
balīyān abalaṃ hi grasate daṇḍadharābhāve.
But when the law of punishment is kept in abeyance,
it gives rise to such disorder as is implied in the proverb of law and order of fishes (matsyanyaya udbhavayati);
for in the absence of a magistrate (dandadharabhave), the strong will swallow the weak;
but under his protection, the weak resist the strong.

== Bibliography ==
- King, Governance, and Law in Ancient India: Kauṭilya's Arthaśāstra, translated and annotated by Patrick Olivelle, Oxford University Press, 2013
- M. B. Chande (2004), Kautilyan Arthasastra, Atlantic, ISBN 81-7156-733-9, especially Book Six: Circle of Kings as the Basis, pp. 305–312
- Vikas Kumar (2010), "Strategy in the Kautilya Arthasastra", Homo Oeconomicus, 27 (2): 289–320
- Mahendra Prasad Singh (2011), "Kautilya: Theory of State", Indian Political Thought: Themes and Thinkers, Pearson, pp. 1–17, ISBN 978-81-317-5851-9
