= Yasovarman =

Yasovarman or Yashovarman may refer to:

- Yasovarman I (889 - 910), king of Angkor
- Yasovarman II (1160 - 1166), king of Angkor
- Yasovarman of Kannauj (c. 725 – 752), king of Kannauj in the western Ganges plain (northern India)
- Yashovarman (Paramara dynasty), r. c. 1133-1142 CE; king of Malwa region in central India
- Yashovarman (Chandela dynasty), r. c. 925-950 CE; king of Jejakabhukti region in central India
- Yashovarman II (Chandela dynasty), r. c. 1164-1165 CE; king of Jejakabhukti region in central India

== See also ==
- Yasodharman
