= 1930 Dhaka riots =

Anti-Hindu communal violence involving loot and arson

The 1930 Dhaka riots were anti-Hindu communal violence involving loot and arson.

== Events ==
On the night of 9 June, a nearly 1,000-strong Muslim crowd cried that the Hindus had tried to set their houses on fire. The revenge against the fictitious attack was taken on the night of 10 June. The miscreants set fire to the timber go-down adjoining the residence of Shyam Chand Basak, a well-to-do businessman from Nawabpur.

=== Attack on Kayettuli ===
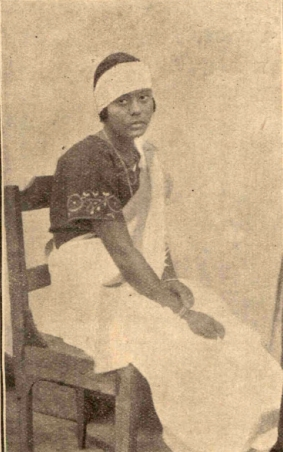
Anindyabala Nandi was injured while defending her house from the attackers.

In the neighbourhood of Kayettuli, the residence of Prasanna Kumar Nandi was attacked. Nandi was out of station. His eldest son, Bhabesh Chandra Nandi, had been arrested a few days earlier by the Imperial British police. At the time of the attack, only the female members of the family were present, barring the youngest son, who was a minor. The attack of a 300-strong armed Muslim mob was staved off for 45 minutes by two minor daughters, Amiyabala and Anindyabala.

=== Looting in nearby villages ===
When rioting started in Dhaka city, the nearby villages were looted as well. The Muslims came from far off villages in country boats and looted in broad daylight. The families belonging to the Bengali Hindu trading castes were the worst affected. The Hindu men, women, and children took refuge in the nearby jute fields to save their lives. In the village of Ruhitpur, Muslim men and women from the neighbouring villages, as well as Ruhitpur village itself, took part in looting the Hindu houses. About 200 Hindu households were looted. Hundreds of Muslim men and women and even children aged ten to twelve years took part in the looting. They looted every movable article in the houses, including the wooden doors and, in one or two cases, the corrugated iron sheets used for roofing. They dug up the ground and searched the bottom of the ponds, every nook and corner of the homestead, where valuable household articles like bell metal utensils may have been hidden. In one case, a dhenki was looted.

== Investigation ==
Two independent committees were set up to investigate the disturbances, one by the government and the other by the citizens of Dhaka. Many people, including eminent citizens of Dhaka, were deposed before the latter committee. The eminent citizens included P. Haldar of Government Women's Teacher Training School; Tapas Ranjan Bandyopadhyay of Dhaka Jana Samiti; Rajani Kanta Basak, the director of Dhakeshwari Cotton Mills; and Surendranath Bhattacharya, retired police inspector. The witnesses stated that the deputy superintendent of police was seen going around the city in the company of 300 to 400 Muslim goons. P. Haldar witnessed Muslims looting shops near her school and saw police constables taking part in the looting.
